= Terje Langli =

Norwegian cross-country skier

Personal information
- Full name: Terje Bjarte Langli
- Nationality: Norway
- Born: 3 February 1965 (age 61) Steinkjer, Norway

Sport
- Sport: Skiing
- Club: Henning IL

World Cup career
- Seasons: 10 – (1987-–1996)
- Indiv. starts: 64
- Indiv. podiums: 4
- Indiv. wins: 2
- Team starts: 17
- Team podiums: 13
- Team wins: 7
- Overall titles: 0 – (4th in 1992)
Medal record
Men's cross-country skiing
Representing Norway
Olympic Games
Gold medal – first place	1992 Albertville	4 × 10 km relay
Bronze medal – third place	1992 Albertville	30 km classical
World Championships
Gold medal – first place	1991 Val di Fiemme	10 km classical
Gold medal – first place	1991 Val di Fiemme	4 × 10 km relay
Gold medal – first place	1993 Falun	4 × 10 km relay
Bronze medal – third place	1987 Oberstdorf	4 × 10 km relay
Junior World Championships
Silver medal – second place	1983 Kuopio	3 × 10 km relay
Silver medal – second place	1985 Täsch	3 × 10 km relay

Terje Bjarte Langli (born 3 February 1965 in Steinkjer) is a former Norwegian cross-country skier for Henning IL and a former skiing waxer for the Norwegian cross-country skiing national team. He won two medals at the 1992 Winter Olympics in Albertville with a gold in the 4 × 10 km relay and a bronze in the 30 km.

Langli's biggest successes were at the FIS Nordic World Ski Championships where he earned three gold medals (1991: 10 km, 4 × 10 km relay; 1993: 4 × 10 km relay) and one bronze medal 4 × 10 km relay: 1987.

He now works for Elbe Normark A.S in sales for Peltonen skis and Rex ski wax in Norway.

== Cross-country skiing results ==
All results are sourced from the International Ski Federation (FIS).

=== Olympic Games ===
- 2 medals – (1 gold, 1 bronze)

Year	Age	10 km	15 km	Pursuit	30 km	50 km	4 × 10 km relay
1988	23	—N/a	12	—N/a	—	—	6
1992	27	20	—N/a	DNS	Bronze	18	Gold

=== World Championships ===
- 4 medals – (3 gold, 1 bronze)

Year	Age	10 km	15 km classical	15 km freestyle	Pursuit	30 km	50 km	4 × 10 km relay
1987	22	—N/a	11	—N/a	—N/a	6	—	Bronze
1989	24	—N/a	—	18	—N/a	15	18	4
1991	26	Gold	—N/a	—	—N/a	4	—	Gold
1993	28	7	—N/a	—N/a	5	6	—	Gold
1995	30	—	—N/a	—N/a	—	22	—	—

=== World Cup ===
==== Season standings ====
Season	Age	Overall
1987	22	27
1988	23	43
1989	24	10
1990	25	8
1991	26	6
1992	27	4
1993	28	10
1994	29	77
1995	30	34
1996	31	69

==== Individual podiums ====
- 2 victories
- 4 podiums

No.	Season	Date	Location	Race	Level	Place
1	1989–90	10 March 1990	Örnsköldsvik, Sweden	30 km Individual C	World Cup	1st
2	1990–91	11 February 1991	Val di Fiemme, Italy	10 km Individual C	World Championships^{[1]}	1st
3	1991–92	7 December 1991	Silver Star, Canada	10 km Individual C	World Cup	3rd
4	1991–92	10 February 1992	Albertville, France	30 km Individual C	Olympic Games^{[1]}	3rd

==== Team podiums ====
- 7 victories
- 13 podiums

No.	Season	Date	Location	Race	Level	Place	Teammates
1	1986–87	17 February 1987	Oberstdorf, West Germany	4 × 10 km Relay F	World Championships^{[1]}	3rd	Aunli / Ulvang / Mikkelsplass
2	1986–87	8 March 1987	Falun, Sweden	4 × 10 km Relay C	World Cup	3rd	Mikkelsplass / Ulvang / Aunli
3	1988–89	5 March 1989	Oslo, Norway	4 × 10 km Relay F	World Cup	3rd	Mikkelsplass / Dæhlie / Ulvang
4	1988–89	12 March 1989	Falun, Sweden	4 × 10 km Relay C	World Cup	3rd	Mikkelsplass / Ulvang / Dæhlie
5	1989–90	11 March 1990	Örnsköldsvik, Sweden	4 × 10 km Relay C/F	World Cup	3rd	Skaanes / Sivertsen / Ulvang
6	1989–90	16 March 1990	Vang, Norway	4 × 10 km Relay C	World Cup	1st	Skinstad / Ulvang / Skaanes
7	1990–91	1 February 1991	Val di Fiemme, Italy	4 × 10 km Relay C/F	World Championships^{[1]}	1st	Skaanes / Ulvang / Dæhlie
8	1990–91	1 March 1991	Lahti, Finland	4 × 10 km Relay C/F	World Cup	1st	Skaanes / Dæhlie / Skjeldal
9	1991–92	18 February 1992	Albertville, France	4 × 10 km Relay C/F	Olympic Games^{[1]}	1st	Ulvang / Skjeldal / Dæhlie
10	1991–92	28 February 1992	Lahti, Finland	4 × 10 km Relay F	World Cup	2nd	Ulvang / Dæhlie / Skjeldal
11	1991–92	8 March 1992	Funäsdalen, Sweden	4 × 10 km Relay C	World Cup	1st	Sivertsen / Ulvang / Dæhlie
12	1992–93	26 February 1993	Falun, Sweden	4 × 10 km Relay C/F	World Championships^{[1]}	1st	Sivertsen / Ulvang / Dæhlie
13	1994–95	5 February 1995	Falun, Sweden	4 × 10 km Relay F	World Cup	1st	Sivertsen / Dæhlie / Alsgaard

Note:^{1} Until the 1999 World Championships and the 1994 Olympics, World Championship and Olympic races were included in the World Cup scoring system.
