= Espen Bjervig =

Norwegian cross-country skier

Personal information
- Nationality: Norway
- Born: 30 June 1972 (age 54) Nøtterøy, Norway

Sport
- Sport: Skiing
- Club: Oseberg Skilag

World Cup career
- Seasons: 9 – (1995–2003)
- Indiv. starts: 64
- Indiv. podiums: 6
- Indiv. wins: 1
- Team starts: 10
- Team podiums: 7
- Team wins: 3
- Overall titles: 0 – (7th in 1999)
- Discipline titles: 0
Medal record
Men's cross-country skiing
Representing Norway
World Championships
Silver medal – second place	1999 Ramsau	4 × 10 km relay

Espen Bjervig (born 30 June 1972) is a former Norwegian cross-country skier who competed from 1995 to 2004. He won a silver medal in the 4 × 10 km relay at the 1999 FIS Nordic World Ski Championships in Ramsau and earned his best individual finish of eight in the 10 km event in those same championships.

Bjervig also won four races of distances up to 15 km from 1997 to 2004. In June 2018, he was appointed as the Norwegian Ski Federation's managing director of cross-country. He had previously worked as sales director for a number of companies and as a marketing director for the Norwegian Ski Federation. Bjervig graduated from the BI Norwegian Business School in 1998, with a Master's degree in Finance.

== Cross-country skiing results ==
All results are sourced from the International Ski Federation (FIS).

=== World Championships ===
- 1 medal – (1 silver)

Year	Age	10 km	15 km	Pursuit	30 km	50 km	Sprint	4 × 10 km relay
1999	26	8	—N/a	14	—	—	—N/a	Silver
2001	28	—N/a	—	DNF	—	—	—	—

=== World Cup ===
==== Season standings ====
Season	Age				
Season	Age	Overall	Long Distance	Middle Distance	Sprint
1995	22	NC	—N/a	—N/a	—N/a
1996	23	NC	—N/a	—N/a	—N/a
1997	24	68	NC	—N/a	50
1998	25	85	59	—N/a	—
1999	26	7	23	—N/a	4
2000	27	8	13	17	9
2001	28	50	—N/a	—N/a	35
2002	29	22	—N/a	—N/a	29
2003	30	51	—N/a	—N/a	42

==== Individual podiums ====
- 1 victory
- 6 podiums

No.	Season	Date	Location	Race	Level	Place
1	1998–99	13 December 1998	Toblach, Italy	15 km Individual C	World Cup	2nd
2	1998–99	5 January 1999	Otepää, Estonia	15 km Individual C	World Cup	1st
3	1998–99	9 January 1999	Nové Město, Czech Republic	15 km Individual C	World Cup	3rd
4	1999–00	11 December 1999	Sappada, Italy	5 km + 5 km Pursuit C/F	World Cup	2nd
5	1999–00	18 December 1999	Davos, Switzerland	30 km Individual C	World Cup	2nd
6	1999–00	27 December 1999	Engelberg, Switzerland	1.0 km Sprint C	World Cup	2nd

==== Team podiums ====
- 3 victories
- 7 podiums

No.	Season	Date	Location	Race	Level	Place	Teammates
1	1998–99	20 December 1998	Davos, Switzerland	4 × 10 km Relay C/F	World Cup	1st	Jevne / Dæhlie / Hetland
2	1998–99	26 February 1999	Ramsau, Austria	4 × 10 km Relay C/F	World Championships^{[1]}	2nd	Jevne / Dæhlie / Alsgaard
3	1998–99	21 March 1999	Oslo, Norway	4 × 10 km Relay C	World Cup	1st	Estil / Aukland / Hjelmeset
4	1999–00	28 November 1999	Kiruna, Sweden	4 × 10 km Relay F	World Cup	2nd	Skjeldal / Alsgaard / Hetland
5	1999–00	19 December 1999	Davos, Switzerland	4 × 10 km Relay C	World Cup	1st	Hjelmeset / Jevne / Estil
6	2000–01	26 November 2000	Beitostølen, Norway	4 × 10 km Relay C/F	World Cup	3rd	Sørgård / Aukland / Leithe
7	2002–03	8 December 2002	Davos, Switzerland	4 × 10 km Relay C/F	World Cup	3rd	Hjelmeset / Estil / Skjeldal

Note: ^{1} Until the 1999 World Championships, World Championship races were included in the World Cup scoring system.
