= Thomas Alsgaard =

Norwegian cross-country skier

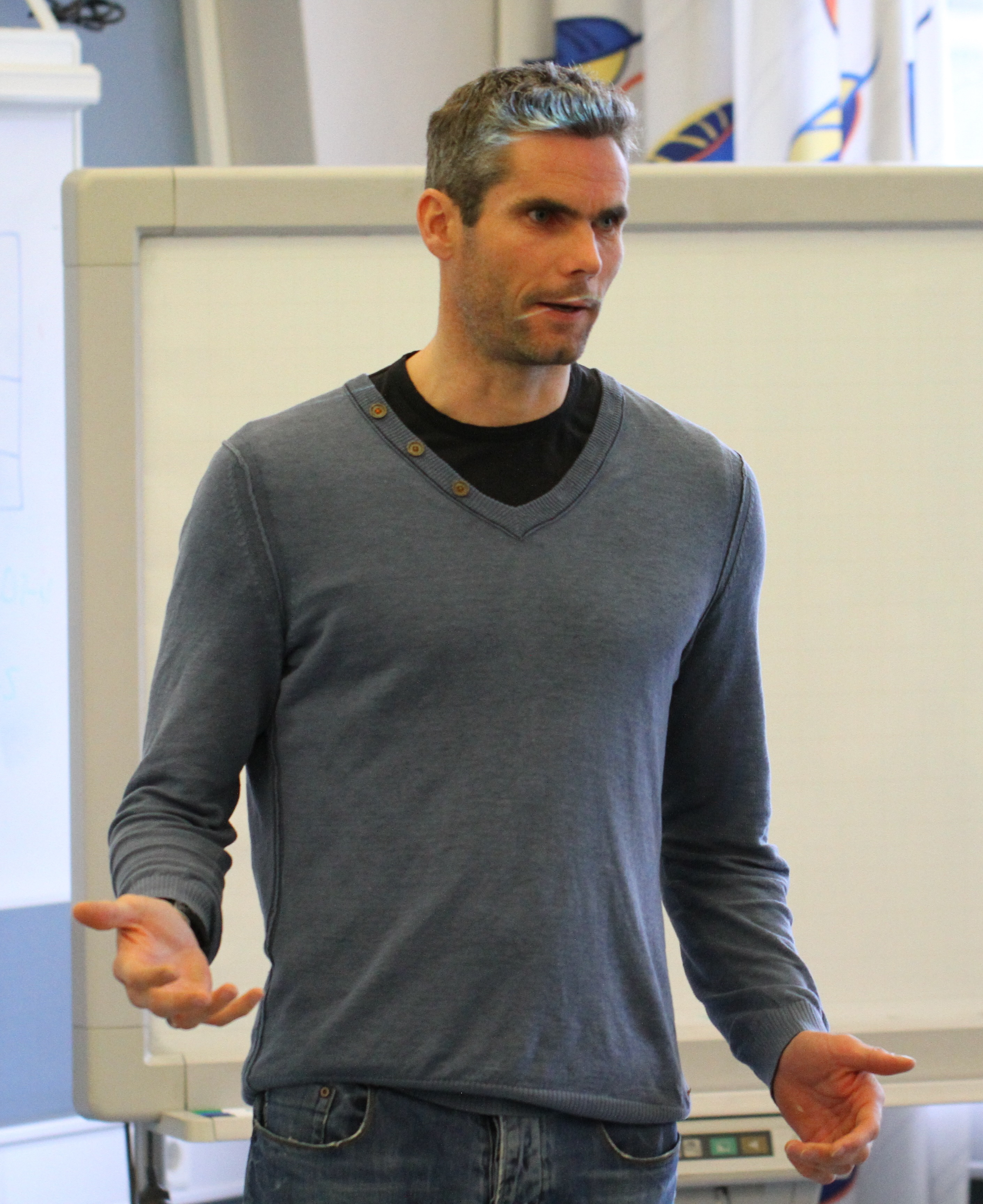
- Alsgaard in April 2013

Personal information
- Full name: Thomas Alsgaard
- Nationality: Norway
- Born: 10 January 1972 (age 54) Lørenskog, Norway
- Height: 1.90 m (6 ft 3 in)

Sport
- Sport: Skiing
- Club: Eidsvold Værks Skiklub

World Cup career
- Seasons: 11 – (1993–2003)
- Indiv. starts: 110
- Indiv. podiums: 29
- Indiv. wins: 13
- Team starts: 31
- Team podiums: 25
- Team wins: 12
- Overall titles: 1 – (1998)
- Discipline titles: 2 – (1 LD, 1 SP)
Medal record
Men's cross-country skiing
Representing Norway
Event	1st	2nd	3rd
Olympic Games	5	1	0
World Championships	6	2	1
Total	11	3	1
Olympic Games
Gold medal – first place	1994 Lillehammer	30 km freestyle
Gold medal – first place	1998 Nagano	4 × 10 km relay
Gold medal – first place	1998 Nagano	10 km + 15 km combined pursuit
Gold medal – first place	2002 Salt Lake City	10 km + 10 km combined pursuit
Gold medal – first place	2002 Salt Lake City	4 × 10 km relay
Silver medal – second place	1994 Lillehammer	4 × 10 km relay
World Championships
Gold medal – first place	1995 Thunder Bay	4 × 10 km relay
Gold medal – first place	1997 Trondheim	4 × 10 km relay
Gold medal – first place	1999 Ramsau	10 km + 15 km combined pursuit
Gold medal – first place	2001 Lahti	4 × 10 km relay
Gold medal – first place	2003 Val di Fiemme	30 km classical
Gold medal – first place	2003 Val di Fiemme	4 × 10 km relay
Silver medal – second place	1999 Ramsau	30 km freestyle
Silver medal – second place	1999 Ramsau	4 × 10 km relay
Bronze medal – third place	1997 Trondheim	30 km freestyle
Junior World Championships
Gold medal – first place	1991 Reit im Winkl	10 km classical
Gold medal – first place	1991 Reit im Winkl	30 km freestyle
Gold medal – first place	1991 Reit im Winkl	4 × 10 km relay
Silver medal – second place	1992 Vuokatti	10 km classical

Thomas Alsgaard (born 10 January 1972) is a Norwegian former professional cross-country skier. Alsgaard is regarded by many as the best performer of the freestyle technique (skating) in cross-country skiing and many of today's best skiers have studied his technique. In total, Alsgaard won 15 medals in the Winter Olympics and FIS Nordic World Ski Championships, making him one of the most successful skiers of all time.

== Early life ==
Born in Flateby, Enebakk, Alsgaard began cross-country ski racing at the age of three. That was when he was entered into a race against many 5-year-olds. He beat all of them. A year later, it was rumored that he was lost in the village the family lived in. In fact, he was found at the local ski area, just about to start his third time around a 9-kilometer loop. Alsgaard says that his passion for skiing comes from liking to be outdoors.

== Athletic career ==
Alsgaard got his international breakthrough in the Lillehammer 1994 Winter Olympics winning the 30 kilometre freestyle event. In total, Alsgaard won 15 medals in the Winter Olympics and FIS Nordic World Ski Championships, making him one of the most successful skiers of all time. Excluding his World Championships debut in 1993, Alsgaard won at least one gold medal at every Olympic Games and World Championships that he participated from 1994 to 2003. Alsgaard retired from racing after the 2003 World Championships.

He won the Holmenkollen medal in 2001 (shared with Adam Małysz and Bente Skari).

== After his career as a professional skier ==
Alsgaard retired from racing in 2003. Between 2013 and 2017 he was the owner and manager of a ski team, Team LeasePlan.

He now works as a technical advisor for Alpina Sports, working in the Nordic boot department.

He is also known as a sports commentator for the Norwegian Broadcasting Corporation.

In the Norwegian Championship in January 2011, Alsgaard took a sensational bronze medal at the 15 km classical individual race, defeating many skiers on the Norwegian World Cup team. He was only beaten by Eldar Rønning (gold) and Martin Johnsrud Sundby (silver). He repeated the feat in 2012, expressing frustration with the lack of aggressiveness and initiative in both the younger elite athletes and the team surrounding them.

== Ski Classics team owner ==
As of December 2016 the team consists of four "allround" skiers and six skiers with langløp (or long races) as their specialty; Swede Lina Korsgren is the team's only female (as of 2016); Hans Kristian Stadheim assists in coaching. On 21 April 2017, Alsgaard announced that Team LeasePlan had to shut down due to sponsorship problems.

== Cross-country skiing results ==
All results are sourced from the International Ski Federation (FIS).

=== Olympic Games ===
- 6 medals – (5 gold, 1 silver)

Year	Age	10 km	15 km	Pursuit	30 km	50 km	4 × 10 km relay	Sprint
1994	22	24	—N/a	DNS	Gold	—	Silver	—N/a
1998	26	5	—N/a	Gold	DNF	6	Gold	—N/a
2002	30	—N/a	—	Gold	12	—	Gold	—

=== World Championships ===
- 9 medals – (6 gold, 2 silver, 1 bronze)

Year	Age	10 km	15 km	Pursuit	30 km	50 km	Sprint	4 × 10 km relay
1993	21	—	—N/a	—	—	DNF	—N/a	—
1995	23	21	—N/a	8	—	27	—N/a	Gold
1997	25	11	—N/a	4	Bronze	—	—N/a	Gold
1999	27	14	—N/a	Gold	Silver	—	—N/a	Silver
2001	29	—N/a	16	5	—	—	12	Gold
2003	31	—N/a	—	—	Gold	—	41	Gold

=== World Cup ===
==== Season titles ====
- 3 titles – (1 overall, long distance, 1 sprint)

Season
Season	Discipline
1998	Overall
1998	Long Distance
1998	Sprint

==== Season standings ====
Season	Age				
Season	Age	Overall	Long Distance	Middle Distance	Sprint
1993	21	20	—N/a	—N/a	—N/a
1994	22	7	—N/a	—N/a	—N/a
1995	23	16	—N/a	—N/a	—N/a
1996	24	8	—N/a	—N/a	—N/a
1997	25	17	6	—N/a	24
1998	26	1st place, gold medalist(s)	1st place, gold medalist(s)	—N/a	1st place, gold medalist(s)
1999	27	13	18	—N/a	27
2000	28	5	4	8	—
2001	29	3rd place, bronze medalist(s)	—N/a	—N/a	6
2002	30	2nd place, silver medalist(s)	—N/a	—N/a	21
2003	31	46	—N/a	—N/a	43

==== Individual podiums ====
- 13 victories
- 29 podiums

No.	Season	Date	Location	Race	Level	Place
1	1993–94	14 February 1994	Lillehammer, Norway	30 km Individual F	Olympic Games^{[1]}	1st
2	1994–95	8 January 1995	Östersund, Sweden	30 km Individual F	World Cup	3rd
3	1994–95	25 March 1995	Sapporo, Japan	15 km Individual F	World Cup	3rd
4	1996–97	21 February 1997	Trondheim, Norway	30 km Individual F	World Championships^{[1]}	3rd
5	1997–98	14 December 1997	Val di Fiemme, Italy	15 km Pursuit F	World Cup	2nd
6	1997–98	16 December 1997	Val di Fiemme, Italy	15 km Individual F	World Cup	2nd
7	1997–98	20 December 1997	Davos, Switzerland	30 km Individual C	World Cup	2nd
8	1997–98	3 January 1998	Kavgolovo, Russia	30 km Individual F	World Cup	2nd
9	1997–98	8 January 1998	Ramsau, Austria	15 km Individual C	World Cup	1st
10	1997–98	10 January 1998	Ramsau, Austria	30 km Individual F	World Cup	1st
11	1997–98	8 March 1998	Lahti, Finland	30 km Individual C	World Cup	2nd
12	1997–98	11 March 1998	Falun, Sweden	10 km Individual F	World Cup	1st
13	1998–99	19 February 1999	Ramsau am Dachstein, Austria	30 km Individual F	World Championships^{[1]}	2nd
14	1998–99	19 February 1999	Ramsau am Dachstein, Austria	15 km Pursuit F	World Championships^{[1]}	1st
15	1999–00	27 November 1999	Kiruna, Sweden	10 km Individual C	World Cup	2nd
16	1999–00	11 December 1999	Sappada, Italy	7.5 km + 15 km Duathlon C/F	World Cup	1st
17	1999–00	9 January 2000	Moscow, Russia	30 km Individual F	World Cup	2nd
18	1999–00	12 January 2000	Nové Město na Moravě, Czech Republic	15 km Individual C	World Cup	1st
19	2000–01	25 November 2000	Beitostølen, Norway	15 km Individual C	World Cup	2nd
20	2000–01	29 November 2000	Beitostølen, Norway	10 km Individual F	World Cup	3rd
21	2000–01	17 December 2000	Brusson, Italy	1.0 km Sprint F	World Cup	1st
22	2000–01	10 February 2001	Otepää, Estonia	10 km Individual C	World Cup	1st
23	2000–01	7 March 2001	Oslo, Norway	1.0 km Sprint C	World Cup	1st
24	2001–02	25 November 2001	Kuopio, Finland	10 km Individual F	World Cup	3rd
25	2001–02	5 January 2002	Val di Fiemme, Italy	10 km + 10 km Duathlon C/F	World Cup	2nd
26	2001–02	2 March 2002	Lahti, Finland	15 km Individual F	World Cup	2nd
27	2001–02	9 March 2002	Falun, Sweden	10 km + 10 km Duathlon C/F	World Cup	1st
28	2001–02	16 March 2002	Oslo, Norway	50 km Individual F	World Cup	1st
29	2001–02	23 March 2002	Birkebeinerrennet, Norway	58 km Mass Start C	World Cup	1st

==== Team podiums ====
- 12 victories – (12 RL)
- 25 podiums – (24 RL, 1 TS)

No.	Season	Date	Location	Race	Level	Place	Teammate(s)
1	1993–94	22 February 1994	Lillehammer, Norway	4 × 10 km Relay C/F	Olympic Games^{[1]}	2nd	Sivertsen / Ulvang / Dæhlie
2	1993–94	4 March 1994	Lahti, Finland	4 × 10 km Relay C	World Cup	2nd	Skjeldal / Eide / E. Kristiansen
3	1994–95	18 December 1994	Sappada, Italy	4 × 10 km Relay F	World Cup	1st	E. Kristiansen / Skjeldal / Dæhlie
4	1994–95	5 February 1995	Falun, Sweden	4 × 10 km Relay F	World Cup	1st	Sivertsen / Langli / Dæhlie
5	1994–95	12 February 1995	Oslo, Norway	4 × 5 km Relay C/F	World Cup	3rd	Sivertsen / Jevne / B. Kristiansen
6	1994–95	17 March 1995	Thunder Bay, Canada	4 × 10 km Relay C/F	World Championships^{[1]}	1st	Sivertsen / Jevne / Dæhlie
7	1994–95	26 March 1995	Sapporo, Japan	4 × 10 km Relay C/F	World Cup	1st	Ulvang / Dæhlie / Skjeldal
8	1995–96	10 December 1995	Davos, Switzerland	4 × 10 km Relay C	World Cup	2nd	Sivertsen / Jevne / Dæhlie
9	1995–96	14 January 1996	Nové Město, Czech Republic	4 × 10 km Relay C	World Cup	2nd	Ulvang / Jevne / Dæhlie
10	1995–96	26 February 1996	Trondheim, Norway	4 × 10 km Relay C/F	World Cup	1st	Ulvang / Jevne / Dæhlie
11	1995–96	1 March 1996	Lahti, Finland	4 × 10 km Relay C/F	World Cup	3rd	Skjeldal / Eide / E. Kristiansen
12	1996–97	28 February 1997	Trondheim, Norway	4 × 10 km Relay C/F	World Championships^{[1]}	1st	Sivertsen / Jevne / Dæhlie
13	1996–97	9 March 1997	Falun, Sweden	4 × 10 km Relay C/F	World Cup	2nd	Hjelmeset / Skaanes / Sørgård
14	1997–98	23 November 1997	Beitostølen, Norway	4 × 10 km Relay C	World Cup	1st	Eide / Jevne / Dæhlie
15	1997–98	6 March 1998	Lahti, Finland	4 × 10 km Relay C/F	World Cup	2nd	Estil / Sivertsen / Eide
16	1998–99	26 February 1999	Ramsau, Austria	4 × 10 km Relay C/F	World Championships^{[1]}	2nd	Bjervig / Jevne / Dæhlie
17	1999–00	28 November 1999	Kiruna, Sweden	4 × 10 km Relay F	World Cup	2nd	Bjervig / Skjeldal / Hetland
18	1999–00	13 January 2000	Nové Město, Czech Republic	4 × 10 km Relay C/F	World Cup	1st	Hjelmeset / Jevne / Skjeldal
19	2000–01	9 December 2000	Santa Caterina, Italy	4 × 5 km Relay C/F	World Cup	1st	Estil / Skjeldal / Hetland
20	2001–02	16 December 2001	Davos, Switzerland	4 × 10 km Relay C/F	World Cup	3rd	Estil / Jevne / Hetland
21	2001–02	10 March 2002	Falun, Sweden	4 × 10 km Relay C/F	World Cup	1st	Estil / Aukland / Skjeldal
22	2002–03	24 November 2002	Kiruna, Sweden	4 × 10 km Relay C/F	World Cup	2nd	Skjeldal / Aukland / Hetland
23	2002–03	8 December 2002	Davos, Switzerland	4 × 10 km Relay C/F	World Cup	1st	Aukland / Bjonviken / Hetland
24	2002–03	19 January 2003	Nové Město, Czech Republic	4 × 10 km Relay C/F	World Cup	1st	Aukland / Estil / Hofstad
25	2002–03	26 January 2003	Oberhof, Germany	10 × 1.5 km Team Sprint F	World Cup	3rd	Svartedal

Note: ^{1} Until the 1999 World Championships and the 1994 Olympics, World Championship and Olympic races were included in the World Cup scoring system.

== Equipment ==
Alsgaard used skis from Madshus, one of Alpina's partners, with Alpina boots and Rottefella bindings.

== See also ==
- List of multiple Olympic gold medalists
