= Øyvind Skaanes =

Norwegian cross-country skier

Personal information
- Nationality: Norway
- Born: 29 May 1968 (age 58) Trondheim, Norway

Sport
- Sport: Skiing
- Club: Strindheim IL

World Cup career
- Seasons: 10 – (1989–1998)
- Indiv. starts: 39
- Indiv. podiums: 0
- Team starts: 9
- Team podiums: 6
- Team wins: 3
- Overall titles: 0 – (19th in 1990)
- Discipline titles: 0
Medal record
Men's cross-country skiing
Representing Norway
World Championships
Gold medal – first place	1991 Val di Fiemme	4 × 10 km relay
Junior World Championships
Bronze medal – third place	1987 Asiago	30 km freestyle

Øyvind Skaanes (born 29 May 1968) is a former Norwegian cross-country skier who competed from 1990 to 1999. He won the gold medal in the 4 × 10 km relay at the 1991 FIS Nordic World Ski Championships in Val di Fiemme and earned his best individual of 15th in the 30 km event at those same championships.

Skaanes won two individual races in his career with a 30 km event in 1996 and a 10 km event in 1998.

== Cross-country skiing results ==
All results are sourced from the International Ski Federation (FIS).

=== World Championships ===
- 1 medal – (1 gold)

Year	Age	10 km	15 km classical	15 km freestyle	Pursuit	30 km	50 km	4 × 10 km relay
1989	20	—N/a	—	30	—N/a	—	—	—
1991	22	—	—N/a	—	—N/a	15	33	Gold
1997	28	—	—N/a	—N/a	—	—	34	—

=== World Cup ===
==== Season standings ====
Season	Age			
Season	Age	Overall	Long Distance	Sprint
1989	20	NC	—N/a	—N/a
1990	21	19	—N/a	—N/a
1991	22	26	—N/a	—N/a
1992	23	NC	—N/a	—N/a
1993	24	64	—N/a	—N/a
1994	25	NC	—N/a	—N/a
1995	26	NC	—N/a	—N/a
1996	27	64	—N/a	—N/a
1997	28	20	16	18
1998	29	24	51	26

==== Team podiums ====
- 3 victories
- 6 podiums

No.	Season	Date	Location	Race	Level	Place	Teammates
1	1989–90	11 March 1990	Örnsköldsvik, Sweden	4 × 10 km Relay C/F	World Cup	2nd	Sivertsen / Ulvang / Langli
2	1989–90	16 March 1990	Vang, Norway	4 × 10 km Relay C	World Cup	1st	Skinstad / Langli / Ulvang
3	1990–91	15 February 1991	Val di Fiemme, Italy	4 × 10 km Relay C/F	World Championships	1st	Langli / Ulvang / Dæhlie
4	1990–91	1 March 1991	Lahti, Finland	4 × 10 km Relay C/F	World Cup	1st	Langli / Dæhlie / Skjeldal
5	1996–97	9 March 1997	Falun, Sweden	4 × 10 km Relay C/F	World Cup	2nd	Hjelmeset / Sørgård / Alsgaard
6	1997–98	23 November 1997	Beitostølen, Norway	4 × 10 km Relay C	World Cup	3rd	Sivertsen / Estil / Aukland
