= Sture Sivertsen =

Norwegian cross-country skier

Personal information
- Nationality: Norway
- Born: 16 April 1966 (age 60) Levanger Municipality, Norway

Sport
- Sport: Skiing
- Club: Leirådal IL

World Cup career
- Seasons: 10 (1990–1999)
- Indiv. starts: 83
- Indiv. podiums: 9
- Indiv. wins: 1
- Team starts: 21
- Team podiums: 14
- Team wins: 7
- Overall titles: 0 – (8th in 1993, 1997)
- Discipline titles: 0
Medal record
Men's cross-country skiing
Representing Norway
Olympic Games
Gold medal – first place	1998 Nagano	4 × 10 km relay
Silver medal – second place	1994 Lillehammer	4 × 10 km relay
Bronze medal – third place	1994 Lillehammer	50 km classical
World Championships
Gold medal – first place	1993 Falun	10 km classical
Gold medal – first place	1993 Falun	4 × 10 km relay
Gold medal – first place	1995 Thunder Bay	4 × 10 km relay
Gold medal – first place	1997 Trondheim	4 × 10 km relay

Sture Sivertsen (born 16 April 1966) is a retired Norwegian cross-country skier who competed during the 1990s. He represented Leirådal IL. He made his world cup debut in Örnsköldsvik in 1990, finishing eight. His first World Cup podium came at Oslo in 1991 where he came third in the 50 km while his final world cup podium came at Val di Fiemme in 1997, where he finished third in the 10 km. He became world champion in 10 km and in the 4 × 10 km relay at the 1993 FIS Nordic World Ski Championships. At the 1994 Winter Olympics in Lillehammer, he finished third in the 50 km. He also has one gold and one silver medal from the olympics in relay, silver from 1994 and gold from 1998. He has two additional world championship relay gold medals from 1995 and 1997

== Cross-country skiing results ==
All results are sourced from the International Ski Federation (FIS).

=== Olympic Games ===
- 3 medals – (1 gold, 1 silver, 1 bronze)

Year	Age	10 km	Pursuit	30 km	50 km	4 × 10 km relay
1994	27	5	7	—	Bronze	Silver
1998	31	9	27	15	—	Gold

=== World Championships ===
- 4 medals – (4 gold)

Year	Age	10 km	15 km	Pursuit	30 km	50 km	4 × 10 km relay
1991	24	—	21	—N/a	7	—	—
1993	26	Gold	—N/a	14	—	—	Gold
1995	28	9	—N/a	DNS	18	—	Gold
1997	30	5	—N/a	16	—	5	Gold

=== World Cup ===
==== Season standings ====
Season	Age			
Season	Age	Overall	Long Distance	Sprint
1990	23	37	—N/a	—N/a
1991	24	13	—N/a	—N/a
1992	25	23	—N/a	—N/a
1993	26	8	—N/a	—N/a
1994	27	10	—N/a	—N/a
1995	28	27	—N/a	—N/a
1996	29	20	—N/a	—N/a
1997	30	8	8	8
1998	31	15	17	12
1999	32	37	NC	33

==== Individual podiums ====
- 1 victory
- 9 podiums

No.	Season	Date	Location	Race	Level	Place
1	1990–91	16 March 1991	Oslo, Norway	50 km Individual C	World Cup	3rd
2	1992–93	22 February 1993	Falun, Sweden	10 km Individual C	World Championships^{[1]}	1st
3	1992–93	13 March 1993	Oslo, Norway	50 km Individual C	World Cup	3rd
4	1993–94	21 December 1993	Toblach, Italy	10 km Individual C	World Cup	3rd
5	1993–94	27 February 1994	Lillehammer, Norway	50 km Individual C	Olympic Games^{[1]}	3rd
6	1993–94	12 March 1994	Falun, Sweden	30 km Individual C	World Cup	3rd
7	1996–97	18 December 1996	Oberstdorf, Germany	30 km Individual C	World Cup	3rd
8	1996–97	8 March 1997	Falun, Sweden	15 km Individual C	World Cup	2nd
9	1997–98	13 December 1997	Val di Fiemme, Italy	10 km Individual C	World Cup	2nd

==== Team podiums ====
- 7 victories
- 14 podiums

No.	Season	Date	Location	Race	Level	Place	Teammates
1	1989–90	11 March 1990	Örnsköldsvik, Sweden	4 × 10 km Relay C/F	World Cup	2nd	Skaanes / Ulvang / Langli
2	1991–92	8 March 1992	Funäsdalen, Sweden	4 × 10 km Relay C	World Cup	1st	Langli / Ulvang / Dæhlie
3	1992–93	26 February 1993	Falun, Sweden	4 × 10 km Relay C/F	World Championships^{[1]}	1st	Ulvang / Langli / Dæhlie
4	1993–94	22 February 1994	Lillehammer, Norway	4 × 10 km Relay C/F	Olympic Games^{[1]}	2nd	Ulvang / Alsgaard / Dæhlie
5	1993–94	13 March 1994	Falun, Sweden	4 × 10 km Relay F	World Cup	1st	Jevne / Ulvang / Dæhlie
6	1994–95	5 February 1995	Falun, Sweden	4 × 10 km Relay F	World Cup	1st	Langli / Dæhlie / Alsgaard
7	1994–95	12 February 1995	Oslo, Norway	4 × 5 km Relay C/F	World Cup	3rd	Jevne / Kristiansen / Alsgaard
8	1994–95	17 March 1995	Thunder Bay, Canada	4 × 10 km Relay C/F	World Championships^{[1]}	1st	Jevne / Dæhlie / Alsgaard
9	1995–96	10 December 1995	Davos, Switzerland	4 × 10 km Relay C	World Cup	2nd	Jevne / Dæhlie / Alsgaard
10	1996–97	8 December 1996	Davos, Switzerland	4 × 10 km Relay C	World Cup	3rd	Skjeldal / Ulvang / Eide
11	1996–97	28 February 1997	Trondheim, Norway	4 × 10 km Relay C/F	World Championships^{[1]}	1st	Jevne / Dæhlie / Alsgaard
12	1996–97	9 March 1997	Falun, Sweden	4 × 10 km Relay C/F	World Cup	1st	Jevne / Skjeldal / Dæhlie
13	1997–98	23 November 1997	Beitostølen, Norway	4 × 10 km Relay C	World Cup	3rd	Estil / Aukland / Skaanes
14	1997–98	6 March 1998	Lahti, Finland	4 × 10 km Relay C/F	World Cup	2nd	Estil / Eide / Alsgaard

Note: ^{1} Until the 1999 World Championships and the 1994 Olympics, World Championship and Olympic races were included in the World Cup scoring system.
