= Erling Jevne =

Norwegian cross-country skier

Personal information
- Nationality: Norway
- Born: 24 March 1966 (age 60) Lillehammer, Norway

Sport
- Sport: Skiing
- Club: Øyer-Tretten IF

World Cup career
- Seasons: 14 – (1987, 1989, 1991–2002)
- Indiv. starts: 92
- Indiv. podiums: 12
- Indiv. wins: 3
- Team starts: 22
- Team podiums: 17
- Team wins: 10
- Overall titles: 0 – (4th in 1997)
- Discipline titles: 0
Medal record
Men's cross-country skiing
Representing Norway
Olympic Games
Gold medal – first place	1998 Nagano	4 × 10 km relay
Silver medal – second place	1998 Nagano	30 km classical
World Championships
Gold medal – first place	1995 Thunder Bay	4 × 10 km relay
Gold medal – first place	1997 Trondheim	4 × 10 km relay
Silver medal – second place	1997 Trondheim	50 km classical
Silver medal – second place	1999 Ramsau	4 × 10 km relay
Junior World Championships
Silver medal – second place	1986 Lake Placid	3 × 10 km relay
Bronze medal – third place	1986 Lake Placid	10 km classical

Erling Jevne (born 24 March 1966 in Lillehammer, Oppland) is a former Norwegian cross-country skier who competed from 1987 to 2005. He won two medals at the 1998 Winter Olympics in Nagano with a gold in the 4 × 10 km relay and a silver in the 30 km.

Jevne also won four medals at the FIS Nordic World Ski Championships with two golds (4 × 10 km relay: 1995, 1997) and two silvers (50 km: 1997, 4 × 10 km relay: 1999).

He also won the 50 km event at the Holmenkollen ski festival in March 1996. He also won six races between 10 km and 30 km, between 1994 and 2001.

== Cross-country skiing results ==
All results are sourced from the International Ski Federation (FIS).

=== Olympic Games ===
- 2 medals – (1 gold, 1 silver)

Year	Age	10 km	15 km	Pursuit	30 km	50 km	Sprint	4 × 10 km relay
1992	26	—	—N/a	—	5	—	—N/a	—
1994	28	—	—N/a	—	—	5	—N/a	—
1998	32	7	—N/a	DNS	Silver	—	—N/a	Gold
2002	36	—N/a	6	—	—	10	—	—

=== World Championships ===
- 4 medals – (2 gold, 2 silver)

Year	Age	10 km	15 km	Pursuit	30 km	50 km	Sprint	4 × 10 km relay
1993	27	11	—N/a	20	7	—	—N/a	—
1995	29	6	—N/a	DNS	7	—	—N/a	Gold
1997	31	7	—N/a	DNF	—	Silver	—N/a	Gold
1999	33	6	—N/a	DNF	—	DNF	—N/a	Silver
2001	35	—N/a	—	—	4	—	—	—

=== World Cup ===
==== Season standings ====
Season	Age				
Season	Age	Overall	Long Distance	Middle Distance	Sprint
1987	21	27	—N/a	—N/a	—N/a
1989	23	NC	—N/a	—N/a	—N/a
1991	25	29	—N/a	—N/a	—N/a
1992	26	15	—N/a	—N/a	—N/a
1993	27	15	—N/a	—N/a	—N/a
1994	28	17	—N/a	—N/a	—N/a
1995	29	13	—N/a	—N/a	—N/a
1996	30	15	—N/a	—N/a	—N/a
1997	31	4	5	—N/a	4
1998	32	8	10	—N/a	7
1999	33	10	19	—N/a	12
2000	34	16	15	10	—
2001	35	47	—N/a	—N/a	—
2002	36	10	—N/a	—N/a	—

==== Individual podiums ====
- 3 victories
- 12 podiums

No.	Season	Date	Location	Race	Level	Place
1	1995–96	16 March 1996	Oslo, Norway	50 km Individual C	World Cup	1st
2	1996–97	7 December 1996	Davos, Switzerland	10 km Individual C	World Cup	2nd
3	1996–97	18 December 1996	Oberstdorf, Germany	30 km Individual C	World Cup	2nd
4	1996–97	11 January 1997	Hakuba, Japan	10 km Individual C	World Cup	2nd
5	1996–97	2 March 1997	Trondheim, Norway	50 km Individual C	World Championships^{[1]}	2nd
6	1996–97	8 March 1997	Falun, Sweden	15 km Individual C	World Cup	3rd
7	1997–98	22 November 1997	Beitostølen, Norway	10 km Individual C	World Cup	3rd
8	1997–98	20 December 1997	Davos, Switzerland	30 km Individual C	World Cup	3rd
9	1998–99	9 January 1999	Nové Město, Czech Republic	15 km Individual C	World Cup	2nd
10	1999–00	17 March 2000	Bormio, Italy	10 km Individual C	World Cup	1st
11	2000–01	24 November 2001	Kuopio, Finland	15 km Individual C	World Cup	2nd
12	2000–01	15 December 2001	Davos, Switzerland	15 km Individual C	World Cup	1st

==== Team podiums ====
- 10 victories
- 17 podiums

No.	Season	Date	Location	Race	Level	Place	Teammates
1	1993–94	13 March 1994	Falun, Sweden	4 × 10 km Relay F	World Cup	1st	Sivertsen / Ulvang / Dæhlie
2	1994–95	12 February 1995	Oslo, Norway	4 × 5 km Relay C/F	World Cup	3rd	Sivertsen / Kristiansen / Alsgaard
3	1994–95	17 March 1995	Thunder Bay, Canada	4 × 10 km Relay C/F	World Championships^{[1]}	1st	Sivertsen / Dæhlie / Alsgaard
4	1995–96	10 December 1995	Davos, Switzerland	4 × 10 km Relay C	World Cup	2nd	Sivertsen / Dæhlie / Alsgaard
5	1995–96	14 January 1996	Nové Město, Czech Republic	4 × 10 km Relay C	World Cup	2nd	Alsgaard / Ulvang / Dæhlie
6	1995–96	25 February 1996	Trondheim, Norway	4 × 10 km Relay C/F	World Cup	1st	Ulvang / Dæhlie / Alsgaard
7	1996–97	28 February 1997	Trondheim, Norway	4 × 10 km Relay F	World Championships^{[1]}	1st	Sivertsen / Dæhlie / Alsgaard
8	1996–97	9 March 1997	Falun, Sweden	4 × 10 km Relay C/F	World Cup	1st	Sivertsen / Skjeldal / Dæhlie
9	1997–98	23 November 1997	Beitostølen, Norway	4 × 10 km Relay C	World Cup	1st	Alsgaard / Eide / Dæhlie
10	1998–99	20 December 1998	Davos, Switzerland	4 × 10 km Relay C/F	World Cup	1st	Bjervig / Dæhlie / Hetland
11	1998–99	10 January 1999	Nové Město, Czech Republic	4 × 10 km Relay C/F	World Cup	3rd	Hjelmeset / Jermstad / Hetland
12	1998–99	26 February 1999	Ramsau, Austria	4 × 10 km Relay C/F	World Championships^{[1]}	2nd	Bjervig / Dæhlie / Alsgaard
13	1999–00	19 December 1999	Davos, Switzerland	4 × 10 km Relay C	World Cup	1st	Hjelmeset / Bjervig / Estil
14	1999–00	13 January 2000	Nové Město, Czech Republic	4 × 10 km Relay C/F	World Cup	1st	Hjelmeset / Skjeldal / Alsgaard
15	2001–02	27 November 2001	Kuopio, Finland	4 × 10 km Relay C/F	World Cup	1st	Hjelmeset / Bjerkeli / Hetland
16	2001–02	16 December 2001	Davos, Switzerland	4 × 10 km Relay C/F	World Cup	3rd	Estil / Alsgaard / Hetland
17	2001–02	10 March 2002	Falun, Sweden	4 × 10 km Relay C/F	World Cup	3rd	Svartedal / Hofstad / Bjonviken

Note: ^{1} Until the 1999 World Championships, World Championship races were included in the World Cup scoring system.
