= Bjørn Dæhlie =

Norwegian cross-country skier (born 1967)

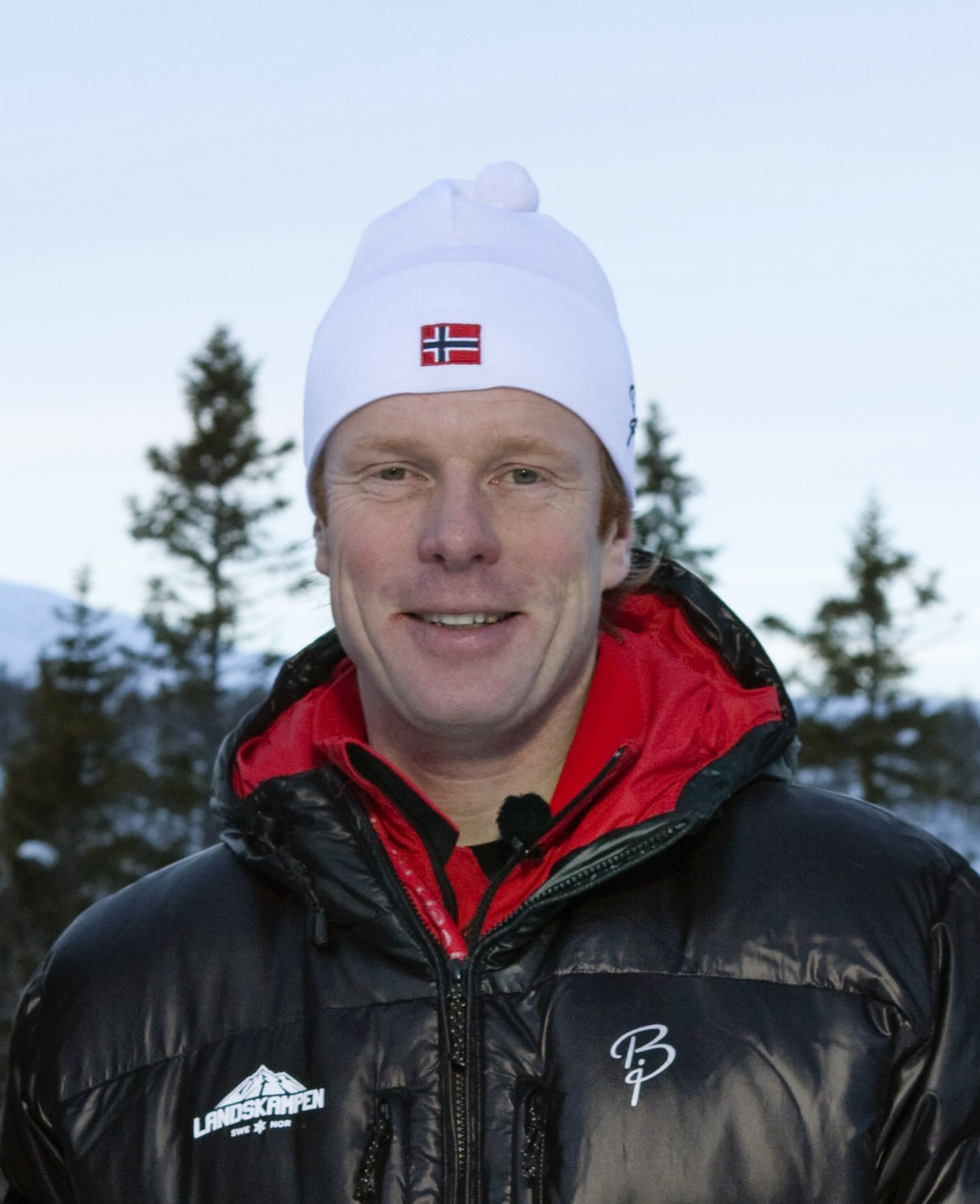
- Bjørn Dæhlie in January 2011

Personal information
- Full name: Bjørn Erlend Dæhlie
- Nationality: Norway
- Born: 19 June 1967 (age 59) Elverum, Norway
- Height: 1.84 m (6 ft 0 in)

Sport
- Sport: Skiing
- Club: Nannestad IL

World Cup career
- Seasons: 11 – (1989–1999)
- Indiv. starts: 127
- Indiv. podiums: 81
- Indiv. wins: 46
- Team podiums: 27
- Team wins: 16
- Overall titles: 6 – (1992, 1993, 1995, 1996, 1997, 1999)
- Discipline titles: 2 – (2 SP)
Medal record
Men's cross-country skiing
Representing Norway
Olympic Games
Gold medal – first place	1992 Albertville	10 km + 15 km combined pursuit
Gold medal – first place	1992 Albertville	50 km freestyle
Gold medal – first place	1992 Albertville	4 × 10 km relay
Gold medal – first place	1994 Lillehammer	10 km classical
Gold medal – first place	1994 Lillehammer	10 km + 15 km combined pursuit
Gold medal – first place	1998 Nagano	10 km classical
Gold medal – first place	1998 Nagano	50 km freestyle
Gold medal – first place	1998 Nagano	4 × 10 km relay
Silver medal – second place	1992 Albertville	30 km classical
Silver medal – second place	1994 Lillehammer	30 km freestyle
Silver medal – second place	1994 Lillehammer	4 × 10 km relay
Silver medal – second place	1998 Nagano	10 km + 15 km combined pursuit
World Championships
Gold medal – first place	1991 Val di Fiemme	15 km freestyle
Gold medal – first place	1991 Val di Fiemme	4 × 10 km relay
Gold medal – first place	1993 Falun	30 km classical
Gold medal – first place	1993 Falun	10 km + 15 km combined pursuit
Gold medal – first place	1993 Falun	4 × 10 km relay
Gold medal – first place	1995 Thunder Bay	4 × 10 km relay
Gold medal – first place	1997 Trondheim	10 km classical
Gold medal – first place	1997 Trondheim	10 km + 15 km combined pursuit
Gold medal – first place	1997 Trondheim	4 × 10 km relay
Silver medal – second place	1995 Thunder Bay	10 km classical
Silver medal – second place	1995 Thunder Bay	30 km classical
Silver medal – second place	1995 Thunder Bay	50 km freestyle
Silver medal – second place	1997 Trondheim	30 km freestyle
Silver medal – second place	1999 Ramsau	4 × 10 km relay
Bronze medal – third place	1993 Falun	50 km freestyle
Bronze medal – third place	1997 Trondheim	50 km classical
Bronze medal – third place	1999 Ramsau	30 km freestyle

Bjørn Erlend Dæhlie (born 19 June 1967) is a Norwegian businessman and retired cross-country skier. From 1992 to 1999, Dæhlie won the Nordic World Cup six times, finishing second in 1994 and 1998. Dæhlie won a total of 29 medals in the Olympics and World Championships between 1991 and 1999, making him the most successful male cross-country skier in history.

During his career, Dæhlie measured a VO_{2} max of 96 ml/kg/min. Dæhlie's result was achieved out of season, and physiologist Erlend Hem who was responsible for the testing stated that he would not discount the possibility of the skier passing 100 ml/kg/min at his absolute peak.

Since retiring, Dæhlie has become a successful businessman in real estate and fashion. His real estate investments have produced a fortune of more than half a billion kroner.

== Early life and career ==
Born in Elverum, Norway, Dæhlie later moved to Nannestad Municipality, where he settled down. Dæhlie attributes much of his success in sports to his upbringing where he was active in hunting, fishing, hiking, kayaking, football and, of course, skiing from a very early age. For much of his childhood Dæhlie wanted to be a football player, but after being prompted by a coach, he tried Nordic skiing. Dæhlie did not have immediate success as a junior racer, but he consistently improved and eventually qualified for the FIS World Cup competitions.

In 2018 he claimed that his family comes from Alvdal Municipality; the claim was made while answering the public during a meeting prior to getting municipal recommendation in regard to building what media calls "his Coop store" - a store in the chain Coop.

== Athletic career ==
Dæhlie was first on the Norwegian skiing team for the 1988 Winter Olympics in Calgary, Canada. However, he did not participate in any races and was there to learn from more senior skiers. He later claimed these Olympics were the turning point for Norwegian skiing before their following period of success. He made his debut in the World Cup in January 1989, finishing 11th on the 15 km freestyle in Kavgolovo. In December of the same year, he won his first World Cup race. He finished first on the 15 km freestyle, the first World Cup race of the season.

In the FIS Nordic World Ski Championships 1991 in Val di Fiemme, Dæhlie won his first World Championship gold medal. He beat skiing legend Gunde Svan on the 15 km freestyle. The medal was unexpected, since Dæhlie was young and still largely unknown. It was Norway's first individual male gold medal in the World Championships since Oddvar Brå won gold in the same race in Oslo in 1982. Dæhlie also skied the last leg on the winning 4 × 10 km relay team.

In 1992, Dæhlie's period of dominance started. He won the World Cup overall for the first time, a feat he would accomplish five more times in the next seven years. In Albertville, Dæhlie won his first Olympic medals. He won gold in 10/15 km freestyle pursuit, 50 km freestyle and was on the winning team for the 4 × 10 km relay. He won a silver in 30 km classical style. Dæhlie also finished fourth on the 10 km freestyle, where his teammate Vegard Ulvang won the gold. Dæhlie completed the fourth leg of the relay, and crossed the finishing line backwards, having won by a margin of over one and a half minutes. Dæhlie and Ulvang completed a clean sweep of the cross-country skiing gold medals, each winning three golds and a silver. Dæhlie was awarded Fearnley's Olympic Prize for his performance, a prize given to the best performing Norwegian athlete in the Olympics.

In the 1994 Winter Olympics in Lillehammer, Norway, Dæhlie won gold in the 10 km classical style and the 15 km freestyle pursuit. He won silver in the 30 km freestyle, where he was beaten by his compatriot Thomas Alsgaard. The 4 × 10 km relay was a very tight race between Norway and Italy. The Italians won the gold after Silvio Fauner beat Dæhlie on the sprint on the last leg. In later years, Thomas Alsgaard took over the fourth leg on the Norwegian relay team with Dæhlie skiing the third leg, since Alsgaard was the better sprinter.

The 1997 Skiing World Championships were Dæhlie's most successful World Championships. In front of the home crowd in Trondheim, he won a medal in every race, taking gold in the 10 km classical race, the 10+15 km combined pursuit and the 4 × 10 km relay. In addition he won a silver in the 30 km freestyle and bronze in the 50 km classical. Dæhlie said the championships were like "Lillehammer all over again" and that "For me, it's very special to compete in Norway".

Dæhlie won three golds and one silver in his last Olympics in Nagano. He won the 10 km classical style, the 50 km freestyle and the 4 × 10 km skiing relay. In the 15 km freestyle pursuit, he got a silver medal having been beaten by Thomas Alsgaard on the sprint. Dæhlie won the 50 km freestyle ahead of Niklas Jonsson by only eight seconds. Both skiers collapsed on the finishing line, having given everything in pursuit of victory. Dæhlie described the race as his hardest ever. Dæhlie also formed a lasting friendship with Philip Boit, the Kenyan skier. Dæhlie waited for Boit on the finish line for 20 minutes following the 10 km race, saying Boit deserved encouragement. Philip went on to name one of his children Dæhlie Boit.

Dæhlie was planning to compete in the 2002 Winter Olympics in Salt Lake City, but he was prevented from participating by a career-ending roller skiing accident in August 1999. The resulting back injury prevented Dæhlie from adding more medals to his collection. He retired from the sport in March 2001, having tried extensive rehabilitation and surgery to come back. His decision to retire shocked the nation of Norway, where Dæhlie was idolized for his great winning record.

Dæhlie's eight Olympic titles were a long-time record for the Winter Olympics (his compatriot Johannes Høsflot Klæbo has surpassed him in 2026), as are his total of 12 Olympic medals (he also won four silver medals) which he amassed in three Olympics (Albertville, Lillehammer and Nagano). In addition to his achievements at the Olympics he had great success in the World Championships where he won 17 medals of which nine were gold medals. He was particularly successful in the Trondheim 1997 World Championships, where he earned medals in all five events. Despite his unanticipated early exit from the sport, Dæhlie is considered by many to be one of the greatest Winter Olympic athletes of all time. In his illustrious career, Dæhlie never won a race at the Holmenkollen ski festival, but he was still awarded the Holmenkollen medal in 1997 (shared with Bjarte Engen Vik and Stefania Belmondo).

He supports non-profit organisations that work for causes such as multiple sclerosis. In 2009 Dæhlie raced in the American Birkebeiner as a fundraiser for multiple sclerosis. Dæhlie competed in the classic race, which is 54 km long, finishing second in a photo finish.

In 2011, Dæhlie won the downhill event in the Kicksled World Championships in Hurdal Municipality. Also in 2011, Dæhlie announced a comeback, stating his intention to participate in long-distance races like Marcialonga and Vasaloppet

Dæhlie also participated in long-distance running in his youth, representing Ullensaker/Kisa IL. He participated in the Nordic junior match versus Denmark/Iceland, Finland and Sweden in 1987.

== Cross-country skiing results ==
All results are sourced from the International Ski Federation (FIS).

=== Olympic Games ===
- 12 medals – (8 gold, 4 silver)

Year	Age	10 km	Pursuit	15 km	30 km	50 km	4 × 10 km relay
1988	20	—N/a	—N/a	—	–	—	—
1992	24	4	Gold	—N/a	Silver	Gold	Gold
1994	26	Gold	Gold	—N/a	Silver	4	Silver
1998	30	Gold	Silver	—N/a	20	Gold	Gold

=== World Championships ===
- 17 medals – (9 gold, 5 silver, 3 bronze)

Year	Age	10 km	15 km classical	15 km freestyle	Pursuit	30 km	50 km	4 × 10 km relay
1989	21	—N/a	—	20	—N/a	—	12	—
1991	23	9	—N/a	Gold	—N/a	–	4	Gold
1993	25	4	—N/a	—N/a	Gold	Gold	Bronze	Gold
1995	27	Silver	—N/a	—N/a	5	Silver	Silver	Gold
1997	29	Gold	—N/a	—N/a	Gold	Silver	Bronze	Gold
1999	31	5	—N/a	—N/a	6	Bronze	–	Silver

=== World Cup ===
==== Season titles ====
- 8 titles – (6 overall, 2 sprint)

Season	
Season	Discipline
1992	Overall
1993	Overall
1995	Overall
1996	Overall
1997	Overall
1997	Sprint
1999	Overall
1999	Sprint

==== Season standings ====
Season	Age	Overall	Long Distance	Sprint
1989	21	14	—N/a	—N/a
1990	22	3	—N/a	—N/a
1991	23	3	—N/a	—N/a
1992	24	1	—N/a	—N/a
1993	25	1	—N/a	—N/a
1994	26	2	—N/a	—N/a
1995	27	1	—N/a	—N/a
1996	28	1	—N/a	—N/a
1997	29	1	2	1
1998	30	2	2	2
1999	31	1	2	1

==== Individual podiums ====
- 46 victories
- 81 podiums

No.	Season	Date	Location	Race	Level	Place
1	1989–90	9 December 1989	Soldier Hollow, United States	15 km Individual C	World Cup	1st
2	1989–90	16 December 1989	Canmore, Canada	15 km Individual F	World Cup	2nd
3	1989–90	17 February 1990	Campra, Switzerland	15 km Individual F	World Cup	1st
4	1989–90	21 February 1990	Val di Fiemme, Italy	30 km Individual C	World Cup	3rd
5	1989–90	3 March 1990	Lahti, Finland	15 km + 15 km Pursuit F/C	World Cup	1st
6	1990–91	5 January 1991	Minsk, Soviet Union	15 km Individual F	World Cup	2nd
7	1990–91	9 January 1991	Štrbské Pleso, Czechoslovakia	30 km Individual F	World Cup	1st
8	1990–91	9 February 1991	Val di Fiemme, Italy	15 km Individual F	World Championships^{[1]}	1st
9	1991–92	7 December 1991	Silver Star, Canada	15 km Pursuit C	World Cup	2nd
10	1991–92	14 December 1991	Thunder Bay, Canada	30 km Individual F	World Cup	1st
11	1991–92	4 January 1992	Kavgolovo, Russia	30 km Individual C	World Cup	1st
12	1991–92	11 January 1992	Cogne, Italy	15 km Individual F	World Cup	1st
13	1991–92	10 February 1992	Albertville, France	30 km Individual C	Olympic Games^{[1]}	2nd
14	1991–92	15 February 1992	Albertville, France	15 km Pursuit F	Olympic Games^{[1]}	1st
15	1991–92	22 February 1992	Albertville, France	50 km Individual F	Olympic Games^{[1]}	1st
16	1991–92	29 February 1992	Lahti, Finland	15 km Individual C	World Cup	1st
17	1991–92	7 March 1992	Funäsdalen, Sweden	30 km Individual F	World Cup	2nd
18	1992–93	13 December 1992	Ramsau, Austria	15 km Pursuit C	World Cup	1st
19	1992–93	3 January 1993	Kavgolovo, Russia	30 km Individual C	World Cup	1st
20	1992–93	9 January 1993	Ulrichen, Switzerland	15 km Individual C	World Cup	3rd
21	1992–93	16 January 1993	Bohinj, Slovenia	15 km Individual F	World Cup	3rd
22	1992–93	20 February 1993	Falun, Sweden	30 km Individual C	World Championships^{[1]}	1st
23	1992–93	24 February 1993	Falun, Sweden	15 km Pursuit F	World Championships^{[1]}	1st
24	1992–93	28 February 1993	Falun, Sweden	50 km Individual F	World Championships^{[1]}	3rd
25	1992–93	19 March 1993	Štrbské Pleso, Slovakia	15 km Individual C	World Cup	1st
26	1993–94	18 December 1993	Davos, Switzerland	15 km Individual F	World Cup	1st
27	1993–94	22 December 1993	Toblach, Italy	15 km Pursuit F	World Cup	3rd
28	1993–94	9 January 1994	Kavgolovo, Russia	15 km Individual C	World Cup	2nd
29	1993–94	15 January 1994	Oslo, Norway	15 km Individual F	World Cup	2nd
30	1993–94	14 February 1994	Lillehammer, Norway	30 km Individual F	Olympic Games^{[1]}	2nd
31	1993–94	17 February 1994	Lillehammer, Norway	10 km Individual C	Olympic Games^{[1]}	1st
32	1993–94	19 February 1994	Lillehammer, Norway	15 km Pursuit F	Olympic Games^{[1]}	1st
33	1993–94	5 March 1994	Lahti, Finland	15 km Individual F	World Cup	2nd
34	1994–95	27 November 1994	Kiruna, Sweden	10 km Individual C	World Cup	1st
35	1994–95	14 December 1994	Tauplitzalm, Austria	15 km Individual C	World Cup	2nd
36	1994–95	17 December 1994	Sappada, Italy	15 km Individual F	World Cup	1st
37	1994–95	8 January 1995	Östersund, Sweden	30 km Individual F	World Cup	1st
38	1994–95	27 January 1995	Lahti, Finland	15 km Individual F	World Cup	2nd
39	1994–95	29 January 1995	Lahti, Finland	15 km Pursuit C	World Cup	3rd
40	1994–95	4 February 1995	Falun, Sweden	30 km Individual C	World Cup	1st
41	1994–95	9 March 1995	Thunder Bay, Canada	30 km Individual C	World Championships^{[1]}	2nd
42	1994–95	11 March 1995	Thunder Bay, Canada	10 km Individual C	World Championships^{[1]}	2nd
43	1994–95	19 March 1995	Thunder Bay, Canada	50 km Individual F	World Championships^{[1]}	2nd
44	1994–95	25 March 1995	Sapporo, Japan	15 km Individual F	World Cup	1st
45	1995–96	26 November 1995	Vuokatti, Finland	10 km Individual C	World Cup	2nd
46	1995–96	29 November 1995	Gällivare, Sweden	10 km Individual F	World Cup	1st
47	1995–96	9 December 1995	Davos, Switzerland	30 km Individual C	World Cup	1st
48	1995–96	13 December 1995	Brusson, Italy	15 km Individual F	World Cup	1st
49	1995–96	16 December 1995	Santa Caterina, Italy	10 km Individual C	World Cup	1st
50	1995–96	17 December 1995	Santa Caterina, Italy	15 km Pursuit F	World Cup	1st
51	1995–96	9 January 1996	Štrbské Pleso, Slovakia	50 km Individual F	World Cup	2nd
52	1995–96	2 February 1996	Seefeld, Austria	10 km Individual F	World Cup	1st
53	1995–96	10 February 1996	Kavgolovo, Russia	15 km Individual C	World Cup	3rd
54	1995–96	24 February 1996	Trondheim, Norway	30 km Individual F	World Cup	2nd
55	1995–96	3 March 1996	Lahti, Finland	30 km Individual F	World Cup	2nd
56	1995–96	9 March 1996	Falun, Sweden	10 km Individual F	World Cup	2nd
57	1996–97	23 November 1996	Kiruna, Sweden	10 km Individual F	World Cup	1st
58	1996–97	14 December 1996	Brusson, Italy	15 km Individual F	World Cup	1st
59	1996–97	18 December 1996	Oberstdorf, Germany	30 km Individual C	World Cup	1st
60	1996–97	21 February 1997	Trondheim, Norway	30 km Individual F	World Championships^{[1]}	2nd
61	1996–97	24 February 1997	Trondheim, Norway	10 km Individual C	World Championships^{[1]}	1st
62	1996–97	25 February 1997	Trondheim, Norway	15 km Pursuit F	World Championships^{[1]}	1st
63	1996–97	2 March 1997	Trondheim, Norway	50 km Individual C	World Championships^{[1]}	3rd
64	1996–97	8 March 1997	Falun, Sweden	15 km Individual C	World Cup	1st
65	1996–97	11 March 1997	Sunne, Sweden	1.0 km Sprint F	World Cup	1st
66	1996–97	15 March 1997	Oslo, Norway	50 km Individual F	World Cup	3rd
67	1997–98	22 November 1997	Beitostølen, Norway	10 km Individual C	World Cup	1st
68	1997–98	13 December 1997	Val di Fiemme, Italy	10 km Individual C	World Cup	1st
69	1997–98	14 December 1997	Val di Fiemme, Italy	15 km Pursuit F	World Cup	1st
70	1997–98	16 December 1997	Val di Fiemme, Italy	15 km Individual F	World Cup	3rd
71	1997–98	20 December 1997	Davos, Switzerland	30 km Individual C	World Cup	1st
72	1997–98	14 March 1998	Oslo, Norway	50 km Individual C	World Cup	3rd
73	1998–99	28 November 1998	Muonio, Finland	10 km Individual F	World Cup	2nd
74	1998–99	12 December 1998	Toblach, Italy	10 km Individual F	World Cup	1st
75	1998–99	13 December 1998	Toblach, Italy	15 km Pursuit C	World Cup	1st
76	1998–99	19 December 1998	Davos, Switzerland	30 km Individual C	World Cup	1st
77	1998–99	9 January 1999	Nové Město, Czech Republic	15 km Individual C	World Cup	1st
78	1998–99	12 January 1999	Nové Město, Czech Republic	30 km Individual F	World Cup	2nd
79	1998–99	19 February 1999	Ramsau, Austria	30 km Individual F	World Championships^{[1]}	3rd
80	1998–99	7 March 1999	Lahti, Finland	15 km Individual C	World Cup	1st
81	1998–99	20 March 1999	Oslo, Norway	50 km Individual F	World Cup	2nd

==== Team podiums ====
- 16 victories
- 27 podiums

No.	Season	Date	Location	Race	Level	Place	Teammates
1	1987–88	13 March 1988	Falun, Sweden	4 × 10 km Relay F	World Cup	2nd	Bjørn / Mikkelsplass / Ulvang
2	1988–89	5 March 1989	Oslo, Norway	4 × 10 km Relay F	World Cup	3rd	Mikkelsplass / Ulvang / Langli
3	1988–89	12 March 1989	Falun, Sweden	4 × 10 km Relay C	World Cup	3rd	Langli / Mikkelsplass / Ulvang
4	1990–91	15 February 1991	Val di Fiemme, Italy	4 ×10 km Relay C/F	World Championships^{[1]}	1st	Skaanes / Langli / Ulvang
5	1990–91	1 March 1991	Lahti, Finland	4 × 10 km Relay C/F	World Cup	1st	Skaanes / Langli / Skjeldal
6	1991–92	18 February 1992	Albertville, France	4 × 10 km Relay C/F	Olympic Games^{[1]}	1st	Langli / Ulvang / Skjeldal
7	1991–92	28 February 1992	Lahti, Finland	4 × 10 km Relay F	World Cup	2nd	Langli / Ulvang / Skjeldal
8	1991–92	8 March 1992	Funäsdalen, Sweden	4 × 10 km Relay C	World Cup	1st	Sivertsen / Langli / Ulvang
9	1992–93	26 February 1993	Falun, Sweden	4 × 10 km Relay C/F	World Championships^{[1]}	1st	Sivertsen / Ulvang / Langli
10	1993–94	22 February 1994	Lillehammer, Norway	4 × 10 km Relay C/F	Olympic Games^{[1]}	2nd	Sivertsen / Ulvang / Alsgaard
11	1993–94	13 March 1994	Falun, Sweden	4 × 10 km Relay F	World Cup	1st	Sivertsen / Jevne / Ulvang
12	1994–95	18 December 1994	Sappada, Italy	4 × 10 km Relay F	World Cup	1st	Kristiansen / Skjeldal / Alsgaard
13	1994–95	5 February 1995	Falun, Sweden	4 × 10 km Relay F	World Cup	1st	Sivertsen / Langli / Alsgaard
14	1994–95	17 March 1995	Thunder Bay, Canada	4 × 10 km Relay C/F	World Championships^{[1]}	1st	Sivertsen / Jevne / Alsgaard
15	1994–95	26 March 1995	Sapporo, Japan	4 × 10 km Relay C/F	World Cup	1st	Ulvang / Skjeldal / Alsgaard
16	1995–96	10 December 1995	Davos, Switzerland	4 × 10 km Relay C	World Cup	2nd	Sivertsen / Jevne / Alsgaard
17	1995–96	14 January 1996	Nové Město, Czech Republic	4 × 10 km Relay C	World Cup	2nd	Alsgaard / Ulvang / Jevne
18	1995–96	25 February 1996	Trondheim, Norway	4 × 10 km Relay C/F	World Cup	1st	Ulvang / Jevne / Alsgaard
19	1995–96	17 March 1996	Oslo, Norway	4 × 5 km Relay F	World Cup	2nd	Kristiansen / Ulvang / Eide
20	1996–97	24 November 1996	Kiruna, Sweden	4 × 10 km Relay C	World Cup	3rd	Skjeldal / Eide / Ulvang
21	1996–97	15 December 1996	Brusson, Italy	4 × 10 km Relay F	World Cup	1st	Kristiansen / Eide / Skjeldal
22	1996–97	28 February 1997	Trondheim, Norway	4 × 10 km Relay C/F	World Championships^{[1]}	1st	Sivertsen / Jevne / Alsgaard
23	1996–97	9 March 1997	Falun, Sweden	4 × 10 km Relay C/F	World Cup	1st	Sivertsen / Jevne / Skjeldal
24	1997–98	23 November 1997	Beitostølen, Norway	4 × 10 km Relay C	World Cup	1st	Alsgaard / Eide / Jevne
25	1998–99	29 November 1998	Muonio, Finland	4 × 10 km Relay F	World Cup	2nd	Bjørndalen / Skjeldal / Hetland
26	1998–99	20 December 1998	Davos, Switzerland	4 × 10 km Relay C/F	World Cup	1st	Jevne / Bjervig / Hetland
27	1998–99	26 February 1999	Ramsau, Austria	4 × 10 km Relay C/F	World Championships^{[1]}	2nd	Bjervig / Jevne / Alsgaard

Note: ^{1} Until the 1999 World Championships and the 1994 Olympics, World Championship and Olympic races were included in the World Cup scoring system.

== See also ==
- List of multiple Olympic gold medalists
- List of multiple Olympic gold medalists at a single Games
- List of multiple Winter Olympic medalists

Records
Preceded by Himself	Athlete with the most medals at Winter Olympics; 8 February 2014 – 19 February 2014; With: Ole Einar Bjørndalen	Succeeded by (Norway) Ole Einar Bjørndalen
Preceded by Himself with (Soviet Union) Raisa Smetanina	Athlete with the most medals at Winter Olympics; 17 February 1998 – 8 February 2014	Succeeded by Himself with (Norway) Ole Einar Bjørndalen
Preceded by (Soviet Union) Raisa Smetanina	Athlete with the most medals at Winter Olympics; 14 February 1998 – 17 February 1998; With: Raisa Smetanina	Succeeded by Himself
Awards
Preceded by Johann Olav Koss	Norwegian Sportsperson of the Year; 1995	Succeeded by Vebjørn Rodal
Preceded by Hanne Haugland; Nils Arne Eggen	Norwegian Sportsperson of the Year; 1998	Succeeded by Lasse Kjus
