= Krister Sørgård =

Norwegian cross-country skier

Personal information
- Nationality: Norway
- Born: April 20, 1970 (age 56) Kirkenes, Norway

Sport
- Sport: Skiing
- Club: Kirkenes og Omegn SK

World Cup career
- Seasons: 11 – (1991–2001)
- Indiv. starts: 68
- Indiv. podiums: 1
- Indiv. wins: 0
- Team starts: 9
- Team podiums: 2
- Team wins: 0
- Overall titles: 0 – (21st in 1997)
- Discipline titles: 0

Krister Sørgård (born 20 April 1970) is a Norwegian cross-country skier who competed between 1991 and 2001. His best World Cup finish was second in a 50 km event in Norway in 1996.

At the FIS Nordic World Ski Championships 1993 in Falun, Sørgård finished 10th in the 10 km + 15 km combined pursuit and 12th in the 10 km events.

He moved to Hønefoss with his wife, Hanne sørgård. They have four children together, Jonas, Emil, Jørgen and Emma.

== Cross-country skiing results ==
All results are sourced from the International Ski Federation (FIS).

=== World Championships ===
Year	Age	10 km	Pursuit	30 km	50 km	4 × 10 km relay
1993	22	12	10	—	—	—

=== World Cup ===
==== Season standings ====
Season	Age				
Season	Age	Overall	Long Distance	Middle Distance	Sprint
1991	20	NC	—N/a	—N/a	—N/a
1992	21	NC	—N/a	—N/a	—N/a
1993	22	26	—N/a	—N/a	—N/a
1994	23	41	—N/a	—N/a	—N/a
1995	24	55	—N/a	—N/a	—N/a
1996	25	27	—N/a	—N/a	—N/a
1997	26	21	24	—N/a	15
1998	27	22	19	—N/a	25
1999	28	57	40	—N/a	93
2000	29	49	42	39	60
2001	30	60	—N/a	—N/a	—

==== Individual podiums ====
- 1 podium

No.	Season	Date	Location	Race	Level	Place
1	1995–96	16 March 1996	Oslo, Norway	50 km Individual C	World Cup	2nd

==== Team podiums ====
- 2 podiums

No.	Season	Date	Location	Race	Level	Place	Teammates
1	1996–97	9 March 1997	Falun, Sweden	4 × 10 km Relay C/F	World Cup	2nd	Hjelmeset / Skaanes / Alsgaard
2	2000–01	26 November 2000	Beitostølen, Norway	4 × 10 km Relay C/F	World Cup	3rd	Aukland / Leithe / Bjervig
