= Egil Kristiansen =

Norwegian cross-country skier

Personal information
- Nationality: Norway
- Born: January 18, 1966 (age 60) Lillehammer, Norway

Sport
- Sport: Skiing
- Club: Lillehammer SK

World Cup career
- Seasons: 10 – (1992–2001)
- Indiv. starts: 47
- Indiv. podiums: 0
- Team starts: 13
- Team podiums: 5
- Team wins: 2
- Overall titles: 0 – (19th in 1995)
- Discipline titles: 0

Egil Kristiansen (born January 18, 1966) is a former Norwegian cross-country skier who competed from 1992 to 2001. He finished eighth in the 30 km event at the 1994 Winter Olympics in Lillehammer.

Kristiansen finished 39th in the 50 km event at the 1995 FIS Nordic World Ski Championships in Thunder Bay, Ontario. His best World Cup finish was sixth in a 10 km event in Italy in 1994.

Kristiansen's lone individual international victory was in a 15 km CISM event in the United States in 2001.

== Cross-country skiing results ==
All results are sourced from the International Ski Federation (FIS).

=== Olympic Games ===
Year	Age	10 km	Pursuit	30 km	50 km	4 × 10 km relay
1994	28	—	—	8	—	—

=== World Championships ===
Year	Age	10 km	Pursuit	30 km	50 km	4 × 10 km relay
1995	29	—	—	—	39	—

=== World Cup ===
==== Season standings ====
Season	Age				
Season	Age	Overall	Long Distance	Middle Distance	Sprint
1992	26	NC	—N/a	—N/a	—N/a
1993	27	65	—N/a	—N/a	—N/a
1994	28	31	—N/a	—N/a	—N/a
1995	29	19	—N/a	—N/a	—N/a
1996	30	44	—N/a	—N/a	—N/a
1997	31	41	33	—N/a	40
1998	32	52	32	—N/a	—
1999	33	82	48	—N/a	—
2000	34	54	25	47	—
2001	35	118	—N/a	—N/a	—

==== Team podiums ====
- 2 victories
- 5 podiums

No.	Season	Date	Location	Race	Level	Place	Teammates
1	1993–94	4 March 1994	Lahti, Finland	4 × 10 km Relay C	World Cup	2nd	Skjeldal / Eide / Alsgaard
2	1994–95	18 December 1994	Sappada, Italy	4 × 10 km Relay F	World Cup	1st	Skjeldal / Dæhlie / Alsgaard
3	1995–96	1 March 1996	Lahti, Finland	4 × 10 km Relay C/F	World Cup	2nd	Skjeldal / Eide / Alsgaard
4	1995–96	17 March 1996	Oslo, Norway	4 × 5 km Relay F	World Cup	2nd	Ulvang / Eide / Dæhlie
5	1996–97	15 December 1996	Brusson, Italy	4 × 10 km Relay F	World Cup	1st	Eide / Skjeldal / Dæhlie
