= Jens Arne Svartedal =

Norwegian cross-country skier (born 1976)

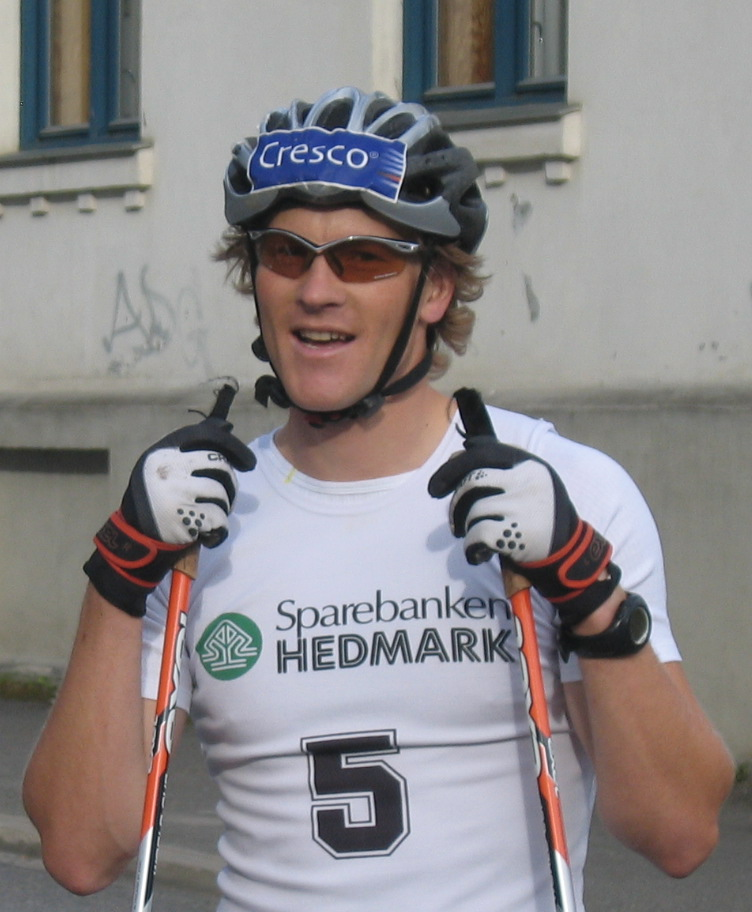
- Svartedal in 2007

Personal information
- Nationality: Norway
- Born: February 14, 1976 (age 50) Sarpsborg, Norway

Sport
- Sport: Skiing
- Club: Trøsken IL

World Cup career
- Seasons: 12 – (1998, 2000–2010)
- Indiv. starts: 132
- Indiv. podiums: 24
- Indiv. wins: 12
- Team starts: 26
- Team podiums: 12
- Team wins: 4
- Overall titles: 0 – (2nd in 2006)
- Discipline titles: 1 – (1 SP)
Medal record
Men's cross-country skiing
Representing Norway
Olympic Games
Silver medal – second place	2006 Turin	Team sprint
World Championships
Gold medal – first place	2007 Sapporo	Individual sprint

Jens Arne Svartedal (born February 14, 1976) is a Norwegian former cross-country skier who competed in the World Cup between 1999 and 2010. He represented Trøsken IL from Sarpsborg in Norway. His greatest achievement is winning the individual sprint gold medal at the 2007 FIS Nordic World Ski Championships in Sapporo. He also has a silver medal in the team sprint event at the 2006 Winter Olympics in Turin.

Svartedal has seventeen cross-country victories since 2001, mostly in the sprint races. Two of those wins were in the sprint events at the Holmenkollen Ski Festival (2002, 2003).

== Cross-country skiing results ==
All results are sourced from the International Ski Federation (FIS).

=== Olympic Games ===
- 1 medal – (1 silver)

Year	Age	15 km	Pursuit	50 km	Sprint	4 × 10 km relay	Team sprint
2006	30	44	—	—	—	5	Silver
2010	34	—	—	23	—	—	—

=== World Championships ===
- 1 medal – (1 gold)

Year	Age	15 km	Pursuit	30 km	50 km	Sprint	4 × 10 km relay	Team sprint
2003	27	19	—	—	—	11	—	—N/a
2007	31	—	—	—N/a	19	Gold	—	—
2009	33	—	—	—N/a	—	20	—	—

=== World Cup ===
==== Season standings ====
Season	Age	Discipline standings					Ski Tour standings	
Season	Age	Overall	Distance	Long Distance	Middle Distance	Sprint	Tour de Ski	World Cup Final
1998	22	NC	—N/a	NC	—N/a	—	—N/a	—N/a
2000	24	52	—N/a	NC	—	16	—N/a	—N/a
2001	25	35	—N/a	—N/a	—N/a	15	—N/a	—N/a
2002	26	9	—N/a	—N/a	—N/a	2nd place, silver medalist(s)	—N/a	—N/a
2003	27	15	—N/a	—N/a	—N/a	8	—N/a	—N/a
2004	28	3rd place, bronze medalist(s)	20	—N/a	—N/a	2nd place, silver medalist(s)	—N/a	—N/a
2005	29	7	21	—N/a	—N/a	8	—N/a	—N/a
2006	30	2nd place, silver medalist(s)	5	—N/a	—N/a	9	—N/a	—N/a
2007	31	8	55	—N/a	—N/a	1st place, gold medalist(s)	21	—N/a
2008	32	9	15	—N/a	—N/a	11	10	41
2009	33	52	37	—N/a	—N/a	75	—	—
2010	34	73	45	—N/a	—N/a	87	—	—

==== Individual podiums ====
- 12 victories (12 WC)
- 24 podiums (22 WC, 2 SWC)

No.	Season	Date	Location	Race	Level	Place
1	1999–00	8 March 2000	Oslo, Norway	1.5 km Sprint C	World Cup	2nd
2	2000–01	1 February 2001	Asiago, Italy	1.5 km Sprint C	World Cup	3rd
3	2001–02	19 December 2001	Asiago, Italy	1.5 km Sprint C	World Cup	1st
4	2001–02	15 March 2002	Stockholm, Sweden	1.0 km Sprint C	World Cup	1st
5	2001–02	13 March 2002	Oslo, Norway	1.5 km Sprint C	World Cup	1st
6	2002–03	15 December 2002	Cogne, Italy	1.5 km Sprint C	World Cup	3rd
7	2002–03	11 March 2003	Drammen, Norway	1.5 km Sprint C	World Cup	1st
8	2003–04	28 November 2003	Rukatunturi, Finland	15 km Individual C	World Cup	2nd
9	2003–04	16 December 2003	Val di Fiemme, Italy	1.2 km Sprint C	World Cup	1st
10	2003–04	18 February 2004	Stockholm, Sweden	1.1 km Sprint C	World Cup	1st
11	2003–04	12 March 2004	Pragelato, Italy	1.3 km Sprint F	World Cup	2nd
12	2004–05	14 December 2004	Asiago, Italy	1.2 km Sprint C	World Cup	1st
13	2005–06	19 November 2005	Beitostølen, Norway	15 km Individual C	World Cup	2nd
14	2005–06	26 November 2005	Rukatunturi, Finland	15 km Individual C	World Cup	2nd
15	2005–06	5 February 2006	Davos, Switzerland	15 km Individual C	World Cup	1st
16	2005–06	9 March 2006	Drammen, Norway	1.2 km Sprint C	World Cup	1st
17	2006–07	25 November 2006	Rukatunturi, Finland	1.2 km Sprint C	World Cup	1st
18	2006–07	28 January 2007	Otepää, Estonia	1.2 km Sprint C	World Cup	1st
19	2006–07	10 March 2007	Lahti, Finland	1.4 km Sprint F	World Cup	3rd
20	2007–08	2 January 2008	Nové Město, Czech Republic	15 km Individual C	Stage World Cup	2nd
21	2007–08	5 January 2008	Val di Fiemme, Italy	20 km Mass Start C	Stage World Cup	2nd
22	2007–08	27 February 2008	Stockholm, Sweden	1.0 km Sprint C	World Cup	1st
23	2007–08	5 March 2008	Drammen, Norway	1.2 km Sprint C	World Cup	2nd
24	2008–09	14 February 2009	Valdidentro, Italy	15 km Individual C	World Cup	2nd

==== Team podiums ====
- 4 victories (3 RL, 1 TS)
- 12 podiums (8 RL, 4 TS)

No.	Season	Date	Location	Race	Level	Place	Teammate(s)
1	2001–02	10 March 2002	Falun, Sweden	4 × 10 km Relay C/F	World Cup	3rd	Jevne / Hofstad / Bjonviken
2	2002–03	26 January 2003	Oberhof, Germany	10 × 1.5 km Team Sprint F	World Cup	3rd	Alsgaard
3	2003–04	23 November 2003	Beitostølen, Norway	4 × 10 km Relay C/F	World Cup	2nd	Hjelmeset / Berger / Hofstad
4	2003–04	6 March 2004	Lahti, Finland	6 × 1.0 km Team Sprint C	World Cup	3rd	Hjelmeset
5	2004–05	5 December 2004	Bern, Switzerland	6 × 1.1 km Team Sprint F	World Cup	2nd	Hetland
6	2004–05	12 December 2004	Lago di Tesero, Italy	4 × 10 km Relay C/F	World Cup	1st	Hjelmeset / Estil / Hofstad
7	2004–05	20 March 2005	Falun, Sweden	4 × 10 km Relay C/F	World Cup	1st	Hjelmeset / Skjeldal / Hofstad
8	2005–06	20 November 2005	Beitostølen, Norway	4 × 10 km Relay C/F	World Cup	3rd	Rønning / Hetland / Hofstad
9	2005–06	18 December 2005	Canmore, Canada	6 × 1.2 km Team Sprint C	World Cup	1st	Rønning
10	2005–06	15 January 2006	Lago di Tesero, Italy	4 × 10 km Relay C/F	World Cup	3rd	Hjelmeset / Gjerdalen / Hofstad
11	2007–08	25 November 2007	Beitostølen, Norway	4 × 10 km Relay C/F	World Cup	1st	Sundby / Hofstad / Hetland
12	2007–08	24 February 2008	Falun, Sweden	4 × 10 km Relay C/F	World Cup	2nd	Hjelmeset / Østensen / Gjerdalen
