= Frode Estil =

Norwegian cross-country skier

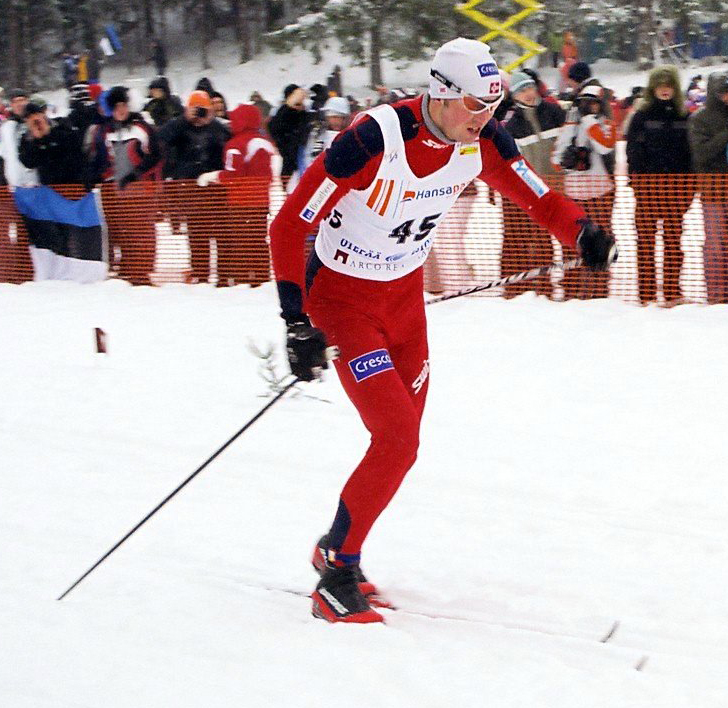
- Frode Estil in 2007

Personal information
- Full name: Frode Estil
- Nationality: Norway
- Born: 31 May 1972 (age 54) Lierne Municipality, Norway
- Height: 188 cm (6 ft 2 in)

Sport
- Sport: Skiing
- Club: Lierne IL

World Cup career
- Seasons: 13 – (1995–2007)
- Indiv. starts: 119
- Indiv. podiums: 20
- Indiv. wins: 4
- Team starts: 29
- Team podiums: 16
- Team wins: 9
- Overall titles: 0 – (5th in 2002)
- Discipline titles: 0
Medal record
Men's cross-country skiing
Representing Norway
Olympic Games
Gold medal – first place	2002 Salt Lake City	10 km + 10 km combined pursuit
Gold medal – first place	2002 Salt Lake City	4 × 10 km relay
Silver medal – second place	2002 Salt Lake City	15 km classical
Silver medal – second place	2006 Turin	15 km + 15 km double pursuit
World Championships
Gold medal – first place	2001 Lahti	4 × 10 km relay
Gold medal – first place	2003 Val di Fiemme	4 × 10 km relay
Gold medal – first place	2005 Oberstdorf	50 km classical
Gold medal – first place	2005 Oberstdorf	4 × 10 km relay
Silver medal – second place	2001 Lahti	30 km classical
Silver medal – second place	2007 Sapporo	50 km classical
Bronze medal – third place	2003 Val di Fiemme	15 km classical
Bronze medal – third place	2003 Val di Fiemme	30 km classical
Bronze medal – third place	2005 Oberstdorf	15 km + 15 km double pursuit

Frode Estil (born 31 May 1972) is a retired Norwegian cross-country skier. He lives in Meråker Municipality with his wife Grete whom he married in the summer of 2001. They have two sons, Bernhard, born in August 2002, and Konrad. Estil was classical specialist and also a specialist at succeeding in World Championships and Olympics. While Estil only won four World Cup races, he won one individual Olympic Gold and one individual World Championship gold. In addition, he won three team events in the World Championships and another team gold in the Olympics.

== World Cup ==
Estil's first World Cup victory was in 1999 in the 30 km event at Davos. His best standing at the end of a season was during 2001/02 when he finished fifth. Estil has been competing in the World Cup since 1995/96, in which he finished the season in 42nd place, and in 1996/97 he finished 63rd. The year after however he jumped up to 12th. The following two years he finished 19th and 12th. Finally, in the 2000/01 season, he finished inside the top ten of the world, finishing eight. The next season (2001/02) was even better for Estil, not only did he get married in the summer but he finished in fifth place overall, his ever highest overall ranking. The next two seasons he finished in sixth. After the 2002/03 season he stopped competing in the sprint events after finishing the season in 58th, he had finished the sprint seasons in 48th (1996/97), 18th (1997/98), 18th (1998/99), 32nd (1999/00), and 39th in 2001/02. In 2003/04 he finished third in the distance standings. 2004/05 was a poor season, finishing 14th in the distance, and 25th in the overall. Estil finished the 2005/06 season in ninth place in the FIS World Cup standings, 456 points behind winner Tobias Angerer. Estil finished fourth in the distance, 420 points behind Angerer, and again did not compete in the sprints.

Estil has had 18 World Cup podium finishes. Four of them in the first place, six in second place and eight in third place. His wins came in 1999/00, 2002/03 and two in 2003/04. The most podium finishes he has had in a single season was in 2002/03, where he had four (one win, two second, and one third). He had three podiums in the seasons either side of that season. All of his wins have been in the classic style, except one double pursuit (in which the first half of the race is in the classical technique).

The 15 km is his most successful event in terms of numbers of podium finishes. Through the years he has had one win, three second places and three third places. His most successful event in terms of wins is the 30 km, where he has had three victories (also one second and one third).

== World Championships ==
Estil's first gold medal in an international championship was in the relay in the FIS Nordic World Ski Championships 2001 in Lahti, where he also took silver in the 30 km.

At the FIS Nordic World Ski Championships 2003, held in Val di Fiemme, Estil won a gold in the 4 × 10 km relay and bronze in the 15 km and 30 km.

At the 2005 FIS Nordic World Ski Championships in Oberstdorf, Estil won gold in the 50 km race, and the 4 × 10 km relay. In the 50 km race he won in a time of 2:30:10.1, beating Anders Aukland by 0.7 seconds, and Odd-Bjørn Hjelmeset came third making it a Norwegian sweep. A characteristic of Estil is to start slow and then come through the pack towards the end of the race, he was 23rd after 12.5 km, and 11th after 27.5 km, but by 42.5 km he was third, and came through to win. In the relay, Norway (Hjelmeset, Estil, biathlete Lars Berger, and Tore Ruud Hofstad) won, with Germany second and Russia third. Norway finished 17.7 seconds ahead of the Germans, with Estil skiing Norway's second fastest leg (behind Berger). He also won a bronze medal in the 15 km + 15 km double pursuit, in a time of 1:19:21.3, 0.8 seconds behind winner Vincent Vittoz, and losing silver to Giorgio Di Centa in a photo finish.

At the 2007 FIS Nordic World Ski Championships in Sapporo, Estil won only one medal. He lost the gold at the finish line of the 50 km event to fellow Norwegian Odd-Bjørn Hjelmeset. Estil has nine World Championship medals as of the Sapporo championships with four gold, two silver, and three bronze.

== Olympics ==
Estil has competed in two Winter Olympics. In the 2002 Games Estil won golds in the 10 km + 10 km combined pursuit, and the 4 × 10 km relay; and won a silver in the 15 km. In the 2006 Winter Olympics he won a silver medal in the 15 km + 15 km double pursuit.

In the 10 km + 10 km combined pursuit, Estil tied with fellow Norwegian Thomas Alsgaard for second place, with Johann Mühlegg winning the race. However Mühlegg was found guilty of doping and disqualified by the IOC in February 2004, therefore upgrading Estil and Alsgaard to joint gold medalists. Alsgaard and Estil clocked times of 49:48.9, 4 seconds ahead of Per Elofsson.

In the same Olympic Games, he also won a silver medal in the 15 km Classic race, and a gold medal in the 4 × 10 km relay together with Alsgaard, Kristen Skjeldal and Anders Aukland. Estil finished the 15 km race in 37:43.4, 36 seconds behind Andrus Veerpalu of Estonia, and 7.4 seconds ahead of Jaak Mae also of Estonia. Estil also took part in the 50 km classic, but finished ninth, in a time of 2:10:44.8, 4:22.0 behind winner Mikhail Ivanov of Russia.

At the 2006 Olympics in Turin, Italy, Estil won the silver medal in the men's 15 km + 15 km double pursuit competition despite taking a fall and breaking a ski at the start of the race which put him in last place. Eugeni Dementiev of Russia won the race, 1.6 seconds ahead of Estil, who finished the race in 1:17:01.8, 0.3 seconds ahead of Pietro Piller Cottrer who came third. In the same Games Estil also took part in the 15 km classical, and the 50 km freestyle mass start, but finished 17th and 28th respectively. Estil's results mirrored those of the Norwegian cross-country team who failed to win a single Gold medal in Turin, owing to stomach illness and waxing mistakes made by Norway's eight man strong service team.

Estil's Olympic medals include two golds and two silvers.

== Medical ==
Estil has a high hemoglobin level, and has received a blood-certificate by the FIS, so that when his blood is tested the maximum hemoglobin allowed to race is 17.5 grams hemoglobin per 100 ml of blood, compared to 17 grams for men and 16 grams per 100 ml for athletes without this certificate.

== Legacy ==
- Estil has had a hill in Soldier Hollow, Utah, United States, (where the cross country skiing and biathlon events of the 2002 Winter Olympics took place) named after him after his three medals.
- Frode Estil was named Norwegian sportsman of the year in 2001.
- Estil received the Holmenkollen Medal in 2007 (Shared with Simon Ammann, Odd-Bjørn Hjelmeset, King Harald V, and Queen Sonja).

== Cross-country skiing results ==
All results are sourced from the International Ski Federation (FIS).

=== Olympic Games ===
- 4 medals – (2 gold, 2 silver)

Year	Age	15 km	Pursuit	30 km	50 km	Sprint	4 × 10 km relay	Team sprint
2002	29	Silver	Gold	—	9	—	Gold	—N/a
2006	33	16	Silver	—N/a	28	—	5	—

=== World Championships ===
- 9 medals – (4 gold, 2 silver, 3 bronze)

Year	Age	10 km	15 km	Pursuit	30 km	50 km	Sprint	4 × 10 km relay	Team sprint
1999	26	—	—N/a	—	—	8	—N/a	—	—N/a
2001	28	—N/a	6	—	Silver	—	—	Gold	—N/a
2003	30	—N/a	Bronze	12	Bronze	29	—	Gold	—N/a
2005	32	—N/a	—	Bronze	—N/a	Gold	—	Gold	—
2007	34	—N/a	14	17	—N/a	Silver	—	—	—

=== World Cup ===
==== Season standings ====
Season	Age	Discipline standings					Ski Tour standings
Season	Age	Overall	Distance	Long Distance	Middle Distance	Sprint	Tour de Ski
1995	22	NC	—N/a	—N/a	—N/a	—N/a	—N/a
1996	23	42	—N/a	—N/a	—N/a	—N/a	—N/a
1997	24	63	—N/a	NC	—N/a	48	—N/a
1998	25	12	—N/a	9	—N/a	18	—N/a
1999	26	19	—N/a	16	—N/a	18	—N/a
2000	27	12	—N/a	6	20	32	—N/a
2001	28	8	—N/a	—N/a	—N/a	—	—N/a
2002	29	5	—N/a	—N/a	—N/a	39	—N/a
2003	30	6	—N/a	—N/a	—N/a	58	—N/a
2004	31	6	3rd place, bronze medalist(s)	—N/a	—N/a	NC	—N/a
2005	32	25	14	—N/a	—N/a	—	—N/a
2006	33	9	4	—N/a	—N/a	—	—N/a
2007	34	10	5	—N/a	—N/a	NC	11

==== Individual podiums ====
- 4 victories
- 20 podiums

No.	Season	Date	Location	Race	Level	Place
1	1997–98	8 March 1998	Lahti, Finland	30 km Individual C	World Cup	3rd
2	1998–99	7 March 1999	Lahti, Finland	15 km Individual C	World Cup	3rd
3	1999–00	18 December 1999	Davos, Switzerland	30 km Individual C	World Cup	1st
4	1999–00	17 March 2000	Bormio, Italy	10 km Individual C	World Cup	3rd
5	2000–01	10 March 2001	Oslo, Norway	50 km Individual C	World Cup	3rd
6	2000–01	17 March 2001	Falun, Sweden	15 km Individual C	World Cup	2nd
7	2001–02	24 November 2001	Kuopio, Finland	15 km Individual C	World Cup	3rd
8	2001–02	8 December 2001	Cogne, Italy	10 km Individual C	World Cup	3rd
9	2001–02	13 March 2002	Birkebeinerrennet, Norway	58 km Mass Start C	World Cup	3rd
10	2002–03	14 December 2002	Cogne, Italy	30 km Mass Start C	World Cup	1st
11	2002–03	25 January 2003	Oberhof, Germany	15 km Mass Start C	World Cup	3rd
12	2002–03	15 February 2003	Asiago, Italy	10 km Individual C	World Cup	2nd
13	2002–03	22 March 2003	Falun, Sweden	10 km + 10 km Duathlon C/F	World Cup	2nd
14	2003–04	10 January 2004	Otepää, Estonia	30 km Mass Start C	World Cup	1st
15	2003–04	17 January 2004	Nové Město, Czech Republic	15 km Individual C	World Cup	2nd
16	2003–04	7 March 2004	Lahti, Finland	15 km Individual C	World Cup	1st
17	2004–05	8 January 2005	Otepää, Estonia	15 km Individual C	World Cup	2nd
18	2005–06	17 December 2005	Canmore, Canada	30 km Mass Start C	World Cup	2nd
19	2006–07	27 January 2007	Otepää, Estonia	15 km Individual C	World Cup	2nd
20	2006–07	25 March 2007	Oslo, Norway	50 km Individual C	World Cup	3rd

==== Team podiums ====
- 9 victories – (9 RL)
- 16 podiums – (15 RL, 1 TS)

No.	Season	Date	Location	Race	Level	Place	Teammate(s)
1	1995–96	17 March 1996	Oslo, Norway	4 × 5 km Relay F	World Cup	1st	Bjonviken / Andersen / Hetland
2	1997–98	23 November 1997	Beitostølen, Norway	4 × 10 km Relay C	World Cup	3rd	Sivertsen / Aukland / Skaanes
3	1997–98	6 March 1998	Lahti, Finland	4 × 10 km Relay C/F	World Cup	2nd	Sivertsen / Eide / Alsgaard
4	1998–99	21 March 1999	Oslo, Norway	4 × 10 km Relay C	World Cup	1st	Bjervig / Aukland / Hjelmeset
5	1999–00	8 December 1999	Asiago, Italy	Team Sprint F	World Cup	2nd	Bjonviken
6	1999–00	19 December 1999	Davos, Switzerland	4 × 10 km Relay C	World Cup	1st	Hjelmeset / Jevne / Bjervig
7	2000–01	9 December 2000	Santa Caterina, Italy	4 × 5 km Relay C/F	World Cup	1st	Skjeldal / Hetland / Alsgaard
8	2001–02	16 December 2001	Davos, Switzerland	4 × 10 km Relay C/F	World Cup	3rd	Jevne / Alsgaard / Hetland
9	2001–02	10 March 2002	Falun, Sweden	4 × 10 km Relay C/F	World Cup	1st	Aukland / Skjeldal / Alsgaard
10	2002–03	8 December 2002	Davos, Switzerland	4 × 10 km Relay C/F	World Cup	3rd	Hjelmeset / Skjeldal / Bjervig
11	2002–03	19 January 2003	Nové Město, Czech Republic	4 × 10 km Relay C/F	World Cup	1st	Aukland / Hofstad / Alsgaard
12	2003–04	23 November 2003	Beitostølen, Norway	4 × 10 km Relay C/F	World Cup	3rd	Bjonviken / Andresen / Bjørndalen
13	2003–04	14 December 2003	Davos, Switzerland	4 × 10 km Relay C/F	World Cup	1st	Aukland / Skjeldal / Hetland
14	2003–04	22 February 2004	Umeå, Sweden	4 × 10 km Relay C/F	World Cup	2nd	Hjelmeset / Skjeldal / Hofstad
15	2004–05	12 December 2004	Val di Fiemme, Italy	4 × 10 km Relay C/F	World Cup	1st	Svartedal / Hjelmeset / Hofstad
16	2006–07	25 March 2007	Falun, Sweden	4 × 10 km Relay C/F	World Cup	1st	Pettersen / Hjelmeset / Northug
