= Tore Bjonviken =

Norwegian cross-country skier

Personal information
- Nationality: Norway
- Born: January 2, 1975 (age 51)

Sport
- Sport: Skiing
- Club: Fossum IF

World Cup career
- Seasons: 10 – (1996–2005)
- Indiv. starts: 76
- Indiv. podiums: 4
- Indiv. wins: 0
- Team starts: 16
- Team podiums: 6
- Team wins: 3
- Overall titles: 0 – (20th in 2001)
- Discipline titles: 0
Medal record
Men's cross-country skiing
Representing Norway
Junior World Championships
Silver medal – second place	1994 Breitenwang	4 × 10 km relay
Bronze medal – third place	1993 Gällivare	30 km freestyle
Bronze medal – third place	1993 Gällivare	4 × 10 km relay

Tore Bjonviken (born 2 January 1975) is a retired Norwegian cross-country skier.

At the Junior World Ski Championships he achieved a tenth place in 1994, and a seventh place and a bronze medal in 1995. He made his World Cup debut in 1996, with a 57th and 45th place. In the 1996–97 he participated in a single World Cup race, nonetheless achieving a second place in the Sunne sprint in March 1997. His first top-30 placement in a distance race came in November 1997 at Beitostølen where he placed 25th.

Altogether, he made the top 10 twelve times in the World Cup, repeating his second place in a sprint once, and achieving two third places in 15 kilometre races. Bjonviken also competed in the World Ski Championships on one occasion, recording a 44th place at the FIS Nordic World Ski Championships 2003. His final World Cup outing came at the Holmenkollen ski festival in March 2005, when he contested the 50 km without finishing. Later that year he was diagnosed with cancer, but beat the disease in 2007. He attended the Norwegian Police University College.

He represents the sports club Fossum IF.

== Cross-country skiing results ==
All results are sourced from the International Ski Federation (FIS).

=== World Championships ===
Year	Age	15 km	Pursuit	30 km	50 km	Sprint	4 × 10 km relay
2003	28	44	—	—	—	—	—

=== World Cup ===
==== Season standings ====
Season	Age					
Season	Age	Overall	Distance	Long Distance	Middle Distance	Sprint
1996	21	80	—N/a	—N/a	—N/a	—N/a
1997	22	45	—N/a	—	—N/a	33
1998	23	40	—N/a	56	—N/a	32
1999	24	56	—N/a	52	—N/a	74
2000	25	38	—N/a	71	43	15
2001	26	20	—N/a	—N/a	—N/a	27
2002	27	34	—N/a	—N/a	—N/a	31
2003	28	48	—N/a	—N/a	—N/a	54
2004	29	75	50	—N/a	—N/a	NC
2005	30	103	65	—N/a	—N/a	—

==== Individual podiums ====
- 4 podiums (4 WC)

No.	Season	Date	Location	Race	Level	Place
1	1996–97	11 March 1997	Sunne, Sweden	1.0 km Sprint F	World Cup	2nd
2	1999–00	28 February 2000	Stockholm, Sweden	1.0 km Sprint C	World Cup	2nd
3	2000–01	25 November 2000	Beitostølen, Norway	15 km Individual C	World Cup	3rd
4	2000–01	17 March 2001	Falun, Sweden	15 km Individual C	World Cup	3rd

==== Team podiums ====
- 3 victories – (3 RL)
- 6 podiums – (5 RL, 1 TS)

No.	Season	Date	Location	Race	Level	Place	Teammate(s)
1	1995–96	17 March 1996	Oslo, Norway	4 × 5 km Relay F	World Cup	1st	Estil / Andersen / Hetland
2	1999–00	8 December 1999	Asiago, Italy	Team Sprint F	World Cup	2nd	Estil
3	2000–01	26 November 2000	Beitostølen, Norway	4 × 10 km Relay C/F	World Cup	1st	Hjelmeset / Skjeldal / Hetland
4	2001–02	10 March 2002	Falun, Sweden	4 × 10 km Relay C/F	World Cup	3rd	Svartedal / Jevne / Hofstad
5	2002–03	8 December 2002	Davos, Switzerland	4 × 10 km Relay C/F	World Cup	1st	Aukland / Hetland / Alsgaard
6	2003–04	23 November 2003	Beitostølen, Norway	4 × 10 km Relay C/F	World Cup	3rd	Estil / Andresen / Bjørndalen
