= Anders Eide =

Norwegian cross-country skier

Personal information
- Nationality: Norway
- Born: 7 March 1971 (age 55) Snåsa Municipality, Norway

Sport
- Sport: Skiing
- Club: Snåsa IL

World Cup career
- Seasons: 11 – (1992–2001, 2005)
- Indiv. starts: 55
- Indiv. podiums: 0
- Team starts: 14
- Team podiums: 8
- Team wins: 2
- Overall titles: 0 – (11th in 1996)
- Discipline titles: 0
Medal record
Men's cross-country skiing
Representing Norway
Junior World Championships
| Gold medal – first place | 1991 Reit im Winkl | 3 × 10 km relay |
| Silver medal – second place | 1990 Les Saisies | 30 km freestyle |

Anders Eide (born 7 March 1971 in Snåsa Municipality) is a Norwegian cross-country skier who has competed since 1992. His best World Cup finish was seventh twice, earning them both in 1996.

Eide also competed in at the 1998 Winter Olympics in Nagano where he finished 11th in the 50 km event. His best finish at the FIS Nordic World Ski Championships was 12th in the 50 km event at Thunder Bay in 1995.

His club was Snåsa IL.

== Cross-country skiing results ==
All results are sourced from the International Ski Federation (FIS).

=== Olympic Games ===
| Year | Age | 10 km | Pursuit | 30 km | 50 km | 4 × 10 km relay |
|---|---|---|---|---|---|---|
| 1998 | 27 | — | — | — | 11 | — |

=== World Championships ===
| Year | Age | 10 km | Pursuit | 30 km | 50 km | 4 × 10 km relay |
|---|---|---|---|---|---|---|
| 1995 | 24 | — | — | — | 12 | — |
| 1997 | 26 | — | — | 26 | — | — |

=== World Cup ===
==== Season standings ====
| Season | Age | | | | | |
| Season | Age | Overall | Distance | Long Distance | Middle Distance | Sprint |
|---|---|---|---|---|---|---|
| 1992 | 21 | NC | —N/a | —N/a | —N/a | —N/a |
| 1993 | 22 | 71 | —N/a | —N/a | —N/a | —N/a |
| 1994 | 23 | 47 | —N/a | —N/a | —N/a | —N/a |
| 1995 | 24 | 39 | —N/a | —N/a | —N/a | —N/a |
| 1996 | 25 | 11 | —N/a | —N/a | —N/a | —N/a |
| 1997 | 26 | 25 | —N/a | 20 | —N/a | 30 |
| 1998 | 27 | 18 | —N/a | 25 | —N/a | 13 |
| 1999 | 28 | 78 | —N/a | NC | —N/a | 74 |
| 2000 | 29 | 68 | —N/a | 33 | 56 | — |
| 2001 | 30 | 117 | —N/a | —N/a | —N/a | — |
| 2005 | 34 | NC | NC | —N/a | —N/a | — |

==== Team podiums ====
- 2 victories
- 8 podiums

| No. | Season | Date | Location | Race | Level | Place | Teammates |
|---|---|---|---|---|---|---|---|
| 1 | 1993–94 | 4 March 1994 | Lahti, Finland | 4 × 10 km Relay C | World Cup | 2nd | Skjeldal / Kristiansen / Alsgaard |
| 2 | 1995–96 | 1 March 1996 | Lahti, Finland | 4 × 10 km Relay C/F | World Cup | 2nd | Skjeldal / Kristiansen / Alsgaard |
| 3 | 1995–96 | 17 March 1996 | Oslo, Norway | 4 × 5 km Relay F | World Cup | 2nd | Kristiansen / Ulvang / Dæhlie |
| 4 | 1996–97 | 24 November 1996 | Kiruna, Sweden | 4 × 10 km Relay C | World Cup | 3rd | Skjeldal / Ulvang / Dæhlie |
| 5 | 1996–97 | 8 December 1996 | Davos, Switzerland | 4 × 10 km Relay C | World Cup | 3rd | Skjeldal / Ulvang / Sivertsen |
| 6 | 1996–97 | 15 December 1996 | Brusson, Italy | 4 × 10 km Relay F | World Cup | 1st | Kristiansen / Skjeldal / Dæhlie |
| 7 | 1997–98 | 23 November 1997 | Beitostølen, Norway | 4 × 10 km Relay C | World Cup | 1st | Alsgaard / Jevne / Dæhlie |
| 8 | 1997–98 | 6 March 1998 | Lahti, Finland | 4 × 10 km Relay C/F | World Cup | 2nd | Estil / Sivertsen / Alsgaard |
