= Tore Ruud Hofstad =

Norwegian cross-country skier

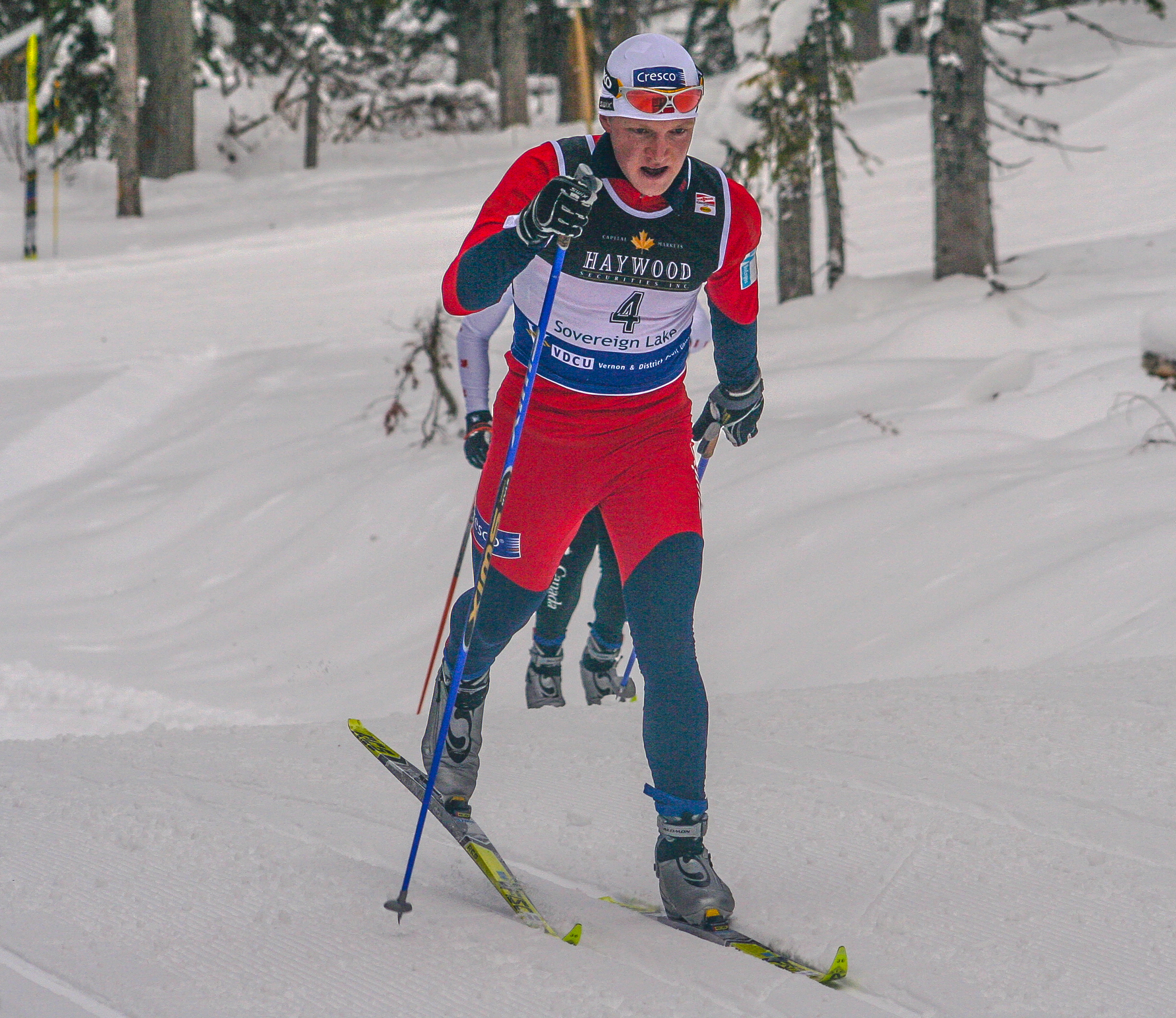
- Tore Ruud Hofstad in 2005

Personal information
- Nationality: Norway
- Born: 9 August 1979 (age 46) Eidsvoll, Norway

Sport
- Sport: Skiing
- Club: Lillehammer SK

World Cup career
- Seasons: 10 – (2000–2009)
- Indiv. starts: 49
- Indiv. podiums: 14
- Indiv. wins: 1
- Team starts: 17
- Team podiums: 10
- Team wins: 5
- Overall titles: 0 – (31st in 2007)
- Discipline titles: 0
Medal record
Men's cross-country skiing
Representing Norway
World Championships
Gold medal – first place	2003 Val di Fiemme	4 × 10 km relay
Gold medal – first place	2005 Oberstdorf	4 × 10 km relay
Gold medal – first place	2005 Oberstdorf	Team sprint
Gold medal – first place	2009 Liberec	4 × 10 km relay
Silver medal – second place	2003 Val di Fiemme	20 km double pursuit
Bronze medal – third place	2005 Oberstdorf	15 km freestyle
U23 World Championships
Bronze medal – third place	2002 Val di Fiemme	15 km skiathlon
Bronze medal – third place	2002 Val di Fiemme	30 km freestyle
Junior World Championships
Silver medal – second place	1998 Pontresina	4 × 10 km relay
Silver medal – second place	1999 Saalfelden	30 km freestyle
Bronze medal – third place	1997 Canmore	4 × 10 km relay

Tore Ruud Hofstad (born 9 August 1979) is a Norwegian former cross-country skier who competed from 1998 to 2010. A freestyle specialist, Hofstad is best noted as a member of the Norwegian relay team during three successful FIS Nordic World Ski Championship campaigns.

In total, Hofstad won four gold medals in the World Ski Championships; 4 × 10 km relay in 2003, 2005 and 2009 and team sprint in 2005. Hofstad won an additional two World Championship medals; one silver in the 20 km double pursuit in 2003 and a bronze medal on the 15 km freestyle in 2005.

Hofstad has eight individual victories from 2001 to 2005 and presently skis for Lillehammer SK. He suffered long term illness that kept him out for the entire 2008 season, which was diognised as TWAR. In 2009 he was part of the record-setting Norwegian relay team which won the men's 4 × 10 km relay for a record fifth consecutive time. Hofstad expressed joy in being able to prove his doubters wrong, after he had performed well on the third leg, gaining over ten seconds on Germany's Franz Göring.

Hofstad announced his retirement from professional cross-country skiing in July 2010.

Hofstad announced he will be launching a comeback attempt in 2012.

== Cross-country skiing results ==
All results are sourced from the International Ski Federation (FIS).

=== Olympic Games ===
Year	Age	15 km	Pursuit	50 km	Sprint	4 × 10 km relay	Team sprint
2006	26	—	—	—	—	5	—

=== World Championships ===
- 6 medals – (4 gold, 1 silver, 1 bronze)

Year	Age	15 km	Pursuit	30 km	50 km	Sprint	4 × 10 km relay	Team sprint
2003	23	—	Silver	—	34	—	Gold	—N/a
2005	25	Bronze	—	—N/a	—	—	Gold	Gold
2009	29	—	34	—N/a	DNS	—	Gold	—

=== World Cup ===
==== Season standings ====
Season	Age	Discipline standings					Ski Tour standings	
Season	Age	Overall	Distance	Long Distance	Middle Distance	Sprint	Tour de Ski	World Cup Final
2000	20	NC	—N/a	NC	NC	—	—N/a	—N/a
2001	21	NC	—N/a	—N/a	—N/a	—	—N/a	—N/a
2002	22	38	—N/a	—N/a	—N/a	—	—N/a	—N/a
2003	23	50	—N/a	—N/a	—N/a	NC	—N/a	—N/a
2004	24	36	24	—N/a	—N/a	NC	—N/a	—N/a
2005	25	48	28	—N/a	—N/a	—	—N/a	—N/a
2006	26	48	31	—N/a	—N/a	—	—N/a	—N/a
2007	27	31	15	—N/a	—N/a	—	—	—N/a
2008	28	134	75	—N/a	—N/a	—	—	—
2009	29	71	44	—N/a	—N/a	—	—	—

==== Individual podiums ====
- 1 victory
- 4 podiums

No.	Season	Date	Location	Race	Level	Place
1	2001–02	2 March 2002	Lahti, Finland	15 km Individual F	World Cup	3rd
2	2003–04	22 November 2003	Beitostølen, Norway	15 km Individual F	World Cup	2nd
3	2005–06	27 November 2005	Rukatunturi, Finland	15 km Individual F	World Cup	1st
4	2006–07	18 November 2006	Gällivare, Sweden	15 km Individual F	World Cup	2nd

==== Team podiums ====
- 5 victories
- 10 podiums

No.	Season	Date	Location	Race	Level	Place	Teammates
1	2001–02	10 March 2002	Falun, Sweden	4 × 10 km Relay C/F	World Cup	3rd	Svartedal / Jevne / Bjonviken
2	2002–03	19 January 2003	Nové Město, Czech Republic	4 × 10 km Relay C/F	World Cup	1st	Aukland / Estil / Alsgaard
3	2003–04	23 November 2003	Beitostølen, Norway	4 × 10 km Relay C/F	World Cup	2nd	Svartedal / Hjelmeset / Berger
4	2003–04	22 February 2004	Umeå, Sweden	4 × 10 km Relay C/F	World Cup	2nd	Hjelmeset / Estil / Skjeldal
5	2004–05	12 December 2004	Lago di Tesero, Italy	4 × 10 km Relay C/F	World Cup	1st	Svartedal / Hjelmeset / Estil
6	2004–05	20 March 2005	Falun, Sweden	4 × 10 km Relay C/F	World Cup	1st	Svartedal / Hjelmeset / Skjeldal
7	2005–06	20 November 2005	Beitostølen, Norway	4 × 10 km Relay C/F	World Cup	3rd	Rønning / Svartedal / Hetland
8	2005–06	15 January 2006	Lago di Tesero, Italy	4 × 10 km Relay C/F	World Cup	3rd	Hjelmeset / Svartedal / Gjerdalen
9	2007–08	25 November 2007	Beitostølen, Norway	4 × 10 km Relay C/F	World Cup	1st	Sundby / Svartedal / Hetland
10	2008–09	23 November 2008	Gällivare, Sweden	4 × 10 km Relay C/F	World Cup	1st	Sundby / Rønning / Northug
