= Kristen Skjeldal =

Norwegian cross-country skier

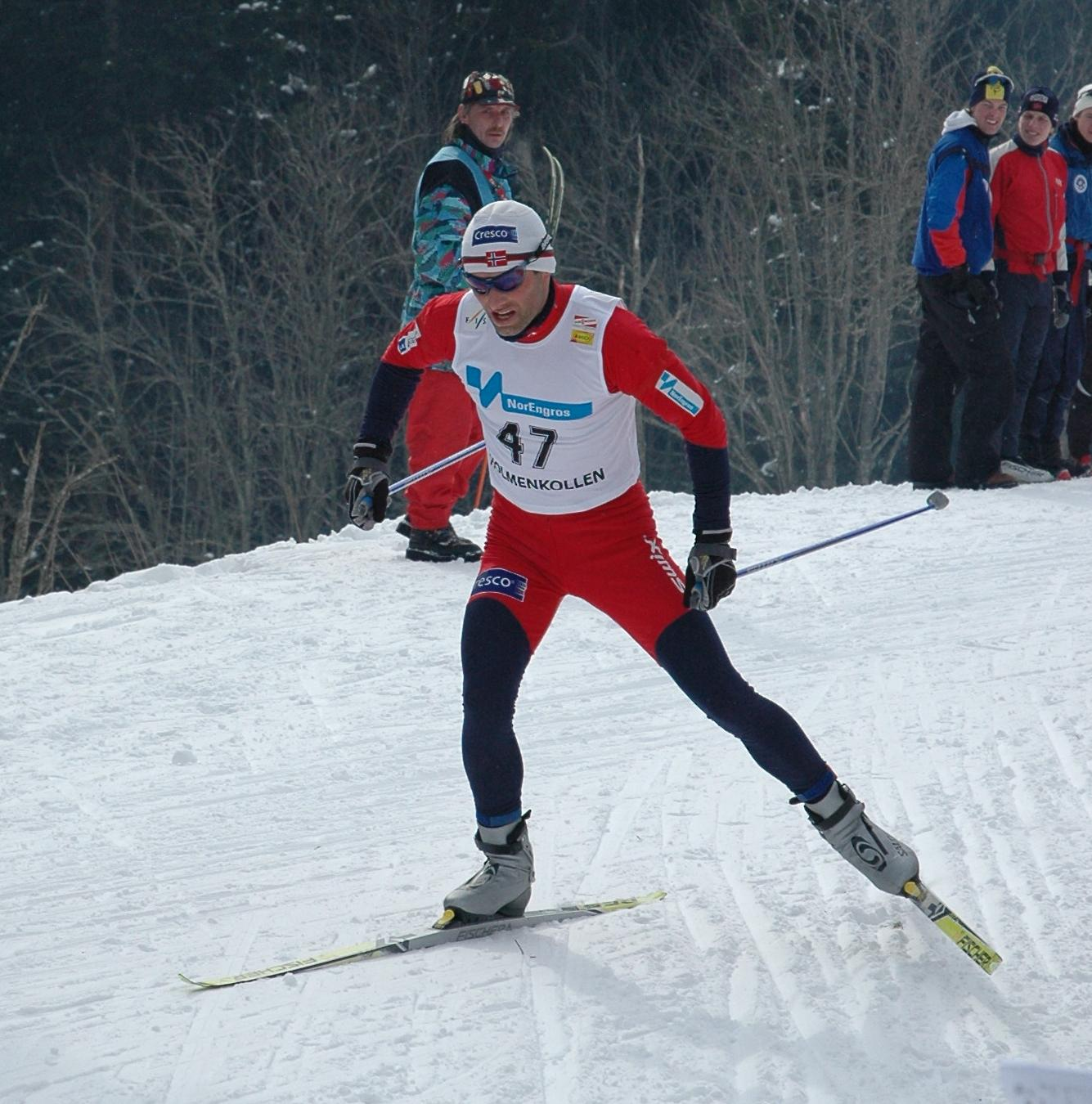

Personal information
- Nationality: Norway
- Born: 27 May 1967 (age 59) Voss Municipality, Norway

Sport
- Sport: Skiing
- Club: Bulken IL

World Cup career
- Seasons: 19 – (1989–1992, 1994–2008)
- Indiv. starts: 160
- Indiv. podiums: 11
- Indiv. wins: 1
- Team starts: 34
- Team podiums: 22
- Team wins: 12
- Overall titles: 0 – (4th in 2002)
- Discipline titles: 0
Medal record
Men's cross-country skiing
Representing Norway
Olympic Games
Gold medal – first place	1992 Albertville	4 × 10 km relay
Gold medal – first place	2002 Salt Lake City	4 × 10 km relay
Bronze medal – third place	2002 Salt Lake City	30 km freestyle

Kristen Skjeldal (born 27 May 1967) is an Olympic champion and cross-country skier from Norway. He has won three olympic medals: two gold and one bronze. He won his first gold medal in the 4 × 10 km relay at the 1992 Winter Olympics in Albertville. He finished fourth in 30 km freestyle event at the 2002 Winter Olympics in Salt Lake City, but was awarded the bronze medal upon Spain's Johann Mühlegg EPO-doping disqualification. Subsequently, devices for blood doping were found at the hotel room of the doctor for the Austrian cross-country team. Since Skjeldal won the bronze behind two Austrians, many regard him as the real olympic champion. Skjeldal also won a gold medal in 4 × 10 km relay at those same games.

His best finish at the Nordic skiing World Championships was a sixth in the 50 km event in 1999. Skjeldal has also won thirteen cross-country skiing events of various distances between 1991 and 2006.

Skjeldal was still an active skier in 2005, located in his ski club in Bulken, Norway. His brother Gudmund Skjeldal also has participated in the Olympics.

In 2005 Gudmund published a biography about his brother, called Den siste langrennaren.

Almost 45 years old, Skjeldal did a remarkable comeback at the Norwegian Championship 2012, finishing eight at the 15 km free, beating all of the Norwegian team elite squad, except Martin Johnsrud Sundby, who won.

== Cross-country skiing results ==
All results are sourced from the International Ski Federation (FIS).

=== Olympic Games ===
- 3 medals – (2 gold, 1 bronze)

Year	Age	10 km	15 km	Pursuit	30 km	50 km	Sprint	4 × 10 km relay
1992	24	38	—N/a	DNS	—	20	—N/a	Gold
1994	26	—	—N/a	—	18	—	—N/a	—
2002	34	—N/a	—	22	Bronze	—	—	Gold

=== World Championships ===
Year	Age	10 km	15 km	Pursuit	30 km	50 km	Sprint	4 × 10 km relay	Team sprint
1991	23	—	7	—N/a	—	17	—N/a	—	—N/a
1995	27	26	—N/a	18	—	—	—N/a	—	—N/a
1997	29	—	—N/a	—	8	—	—N/a	—	—N/a
1999	31	—	—N/a	—	14	6	—N/a	—	—N/a
2001	33	—N/a	—	10	—	10	—	—	—N/a
2003	35	—N/a	—	22	—	24	—	—	—N/a
2005	37	—N/a	—	7	—N/a	7	—	—	—

=== World Cup ===
==== Season standings ====
Season	Age	Discipline standings					Ski Tour standings	
Season	Age	Overall	Distance	Long Distance	Middle Distance	Sprint	Tour de Ski	World Cup Final
1989	21	38	—N/a	—N/a	—N/a	—N/a	—N/a	—N/a
1990	22	38	—N/a	—N/a	—N/a	—N/a	—N/a	—N/a
1991	23	5	—N/a	—N/a	—N/a	—N/a	—N/a	—N/a
1992	24	8	—N/a	—N/a	—N/a	—N/a	—N/a	—N/a
1994	26	26	—N/a	—N/a	—N/a	—N/a	—N/a	—N/a
1995	27	11	—N/a	—N/a	—N/a	—N/a	—N/a	—N/a
1996	28	32	—N/a	—N/a	—N/a	—N/a	—N/a	—N/a
1997	29	7	—N/a	12	—N/a	5	—N/a	—N/a
1998	30	29	—N/a	17	—N/a	55	—N/a	—N/a
1999	31	19	—N/a	10	—N/a	25	—N/a	—N/a
2000	32	21	—N/a	16	11	—	—N/a	—N/a
2001	33	9	—N/a	—N/a	—N/a	—	—N/a	—N/a
2002	34	4	—N/a	—N/a	—N/a	—	—N/a	—N/a
2003	35	22	—N/a	—N/a	—N/a	—	—N/a	—N/a
2004	36	15	12	—N/a	—N/a	—	—N/a	—N/a
2005	37	26	15	—N/a	—N/a	—	—N/a	—N/a
2006	38	71	48	—N/a	—N/a	—	—N/a	—N/a
2007	39	124	71	—N/a	—N/a	—	—	—N/a
2008	40	119	65	—N/a	—N/a	—	—	—

==== Individual podiums ====
- 1 victory
- 11 podiums

No.	Season	Date	Location	Race	Level	Place
1	1990–91	3 March 1991	Lahti, Finland	30 km Individual F	World Cup	1st
2	1991–92	14 December 1991	Thunder Bay, Canada	30 km Individual F	World Cup	3rd
3	1994–95	27 November 1994	Kiruna, Sweden	10 km Individual C	World Cup	3rd
4	1996–97	23 November 1996	Kiruna, Sweden	10 km Individual F	World Cup	3rd
5	1996–97	14 December 1996	Brusson, Italy	15 km Individual F	World Cup	3rd
6	2000–01	17 March 2001	Falun, Sweden	15 km Individual C	World Cup	3rd
7	2001–02	12 January 2002	Nové Město, Czech Republic	10 km Individual F	World Cup	3rd
8	2001–02	9 March 2002	Falun, Sweden	10 km + 10 km Pursuit C/F	World Cup	3rd
9	2001–02	16 March 2002	Oslo, Norway	50 km Individual F	World Cup	2nd
10	2003–04	6 December 2003	Toblach, Italy	30 km Mass Start F	World Cup	3rd
11	2004–05	22 January 2005	Pragelato, Italy	15 km + 15 km Pursuit C/F	World Cup	3rd

==== Team podiums ====
- 12 victories
- 22 podiums

No.	Season	Date	Location	Race	Level	Place	Teammates
1	1990–91	1 March 1991	Lahti, Finland	4 × 10 km Relay C/F	World Cup	1st	Langli / Skaanes / Dæhlie
2	1991–92	18 February 1992	Albertville, France	4 × 10 km Relay C/F	Olympic Games^{[1]}	1st	Langli / Ulvang / Dæhlie
3	1991–92	28 February 1992	Lahti, Finland	4 × 10 km Relay F	World Cup	2nd	Langli / Ulvang / Dæhlie
4	1993–94	4 March 1994	Lahti, Finland	4 × 10 km Relay C	World Cup	2nd	Eide / Kristiansen / Alsgaard
5	1994–95	18 December 1994	Sappada, Italy	4 × 10 km Relay F	World Cup	1st	Kristiansen / Dæhlie / Alsgaard
6	1994–95	26 March 1995	Sapporo, Japan	4 × 10 km Relay C/F	World Cup	1st	Ulvang / Dæhlie / Alsgaard
7	1995–96	1 March 1996	Lahti, Finland	4 × 10 km Relay C/F	World Cup	2nd	Eide / Kristiansen / Alsgaard
8	1996–97	24 November 1996	Kiruna, Sweden	4 × 10 km Relay C	World Cup	3rd	Eide / Ulvang / Dæhlie
9	1996–97	8 December 1996	Davos, Switzerland	4 × 10 km Relay C	World Cup	3rd	Ulvang / Eide / Sivertsen
10	1996–97	15 December 1996	Brusson, Italy	4 × 10 km Relay F	World Cup	1st	Kristiansen / Eide / Dæhlie
11	1996–97	9 March 1997	Falun, Sweden	4 × 10 km Relay C/F	World Cup	1st	Sivertsen / Jevne / Dæhlie
12	1998–99	29 November 1998	Muonio, Finland	4 × 10 km Relay F	World Cup	2nd	Bjørndalen / Dæhlie / Hetland
13	1999–00	28 November 1999	Kiruna, Sweden	4 × 10 km Relay F	World Cup	2nd	Bjervig / Alsgaard / Hetland
14	1999–00	13 January 2000	Nové Město, Czech Republic	4 × 10 km Relay C/F	World Cup	1st	Hjelmeset / Jevne / Alsgaard
15	2000–01	26 November 2000	Beitostølen, Norway	4 × 10 km Relay C/F	World Cup	1st	Bjonviken / Hjelmeset / Hetland
16	2000–01	9 December 2000	Santa Caterina, Italy	4 × 5 km Relay C/F	World Cup	1st	Estil / Hetland / Alsgaard
17	2001–02	10 March 2002	Falun, Sweden	4 × 10 km Relay C/F	World Cup	1st	Estil / Aukland / Alsgaard
18	2002–03	24 November 2002	Kiruna, Sweden	4 × 10 km Relay C/F	World Cup	2nd	Aukland / Hetland / Alsgaard
19	2002–03	8 December 2002	Davos, Switzerland	4 × 10 km Relay C/F	World Cup	3rd	Hjelmeset / Estil / Bjervig
20	2003–04	14 December 2003	Davos, Switzerland	4 × 10 km Relay C/F	World Cup	1st	Aukland / Estil / Hetland
21	2003–04	22 February 2004	Umeå, Sweden	4 × 10 km Relay C/F	World Cup	2nd	Hjelmeset / Estil / Hofstad
22	2004–05	20 March 2005	Falun, Sweden	4 × 10 km Relay C/F	World Cup	1st	Svartedal / Hjelmeset / Hofstad

Note: ^{1} Until the 1994 Olympics, Olympic races were included in the World Cup scoring system.
