= Alpina Žiri =

Slovenian footwear company

Alpina
- Company type: Joint-stock
- Industry: Footwear
- Founded: 1947; 78 years ago as "Žiri Shoe Factory"
- Headquarters: Slovenia
- Products: Sneakers, snow boots, shoes
- Number of employees: 1,000
- Website: alpina.si

Alpina is a Slovenian footwear manufacturing company founded in 1947 after several private shoe making workshops with long tradition merged in the town of Žiri. Initially named "Žiri Shoe Factory", it was renamed "Alpina" in 1951. In 1985, the company employed almost 2,000 people. Alpina operates as a joint stock company, with approximately a thousand employees producing over 1.7 million pairs of shoes and boots each year. The greater part of production is sold abroad under their own brand name.

Alpina currently produces athletic, and winter sports footwear through its subsidiary "Alpina Sports". Products include snow boots, and a line of shoes for different purposes, such as oxford and derby shoes, platform and ballet shoes, and sandals.

Alpina is the leading producer of cross-country boots, with a 30 percent world market share and provides for several cross-country and biathlon national teams (Slovenia, Norway, Sweden, Italy, and Canada). Products are exported to countries where skiing is extremely popular, including the United States, Croatia, Germany, the Czech Republic, Austria, and Poland. Alpina also has expanded its network of retail stores, mostly in the South East Europe.

== Controversy ==
During the 2022 Russian invasion of Ukraine, Alpina refused to join the international community and withdraw from the Russian market. Research from Yale University published on August 10, 2022, identifying how companies were reacting to Russia's invasion, identified Alpina in the worst category of "Digging in", meaning Defying Demands for Exit: companies defying demands for exit/reduction of activities.
