= 1995–96 FIS Cross-Country World Cup =

Cross-country skiing competition

Discipline	Men	Women
Overall	(Norway) Bjørn Dæhlie (4th title)	(Italy) Manuela Di Centa (2nd title)
Nations Cup	Norway	Russia
- Nations Cup Overall: Russia

Competition
Locations	14 venues	14 venues
Individual	16 events	16 events
Relay/Team	6 events	5 events

The 1995–96 FIS Cross-Country World Cup was the 15th official World Cup season in cross-country skiing for men and women. The season began in Vuokatti, Finland, on 25 November 1995 and finished at Holmenkollen, Oslo, Norway, on 16 March 1996. Bjørn Dæhlie of Norway won the combined men's cup, and Manuela Di Centa of Italy won the women's.

== Calendar ==
=== Men ===
C – Classic / F – Freestyle
WC	Date	Place	Discipline	Winner	Second	Third	Ref.
1	26 November 1995	(Finland) Vuokatti	10 km C	(Kazakhstan) Vladimir Smirnov	(Norway) Bjørn Dæhlie	(Finland) Sami Repo	
2	29 November 1995	(Sweden) Gällivare	15 km F	(Norway) Bjørn Dæhlie	(Finland) Jari Isometsä	(Italy) Silvio Fauner	
3	9 December 1995	(Switzerland) Davos	30 km C	(Norway) Bjørn Dæhlie	(Kazakhstan) Vladimir Smirnov	(Italy) Silvio Fauner	
4	13 December 1995	(Italy) Brusson	15 km F	(Norway) Bjørn Dæhlie	(Italy) Silvio Fauner	(Kazakhstan) Vladimir Smirnov	
5	16 December 1995	(Italy) Santa Caterina	10 km C	(Norway) Bjørn Dæhlie	(Kazakhstan) Vladimir Smirnov	(Finland) Mika Myllylä	
6	17 December 1995	(Italy) Santa Caterina	15 km F Pursuit	(Norway) Bjørn Dæhlie	(Finland) Jari Isometsä	(Kazakhstan) Vladimir Smirnov	
7	9 January 1996	(Slovakia) Štrbské Pleso	50 km F	(Kazakhstan) Vladimir Smirnov	(Norway) Bjørn Dæhlie	(Sweden) Niklas Jonsson	
8	13 January 1996	(Czech Republic) Nové Město	15 km C Pursuit	(Kazakhstan) Vladimir Smirnov	(Finland) Jari Isometsä	(Finland) Mika Myllylä	
9	2 February 1996	(Austria) Seefeld	10 km F	(Norway) Bjørn Dæhlie	(Italy) Fulvio Valbusa	(Finland) Jari Isometsä	
10	4 February 1996	(Germany) Reit im Winkl	Sprint F	(Norway) Tor Arne Hetland	(Germany) Peter Schlickenrieder	(Italy) Silvio Fauner	
11	10 February 1996	(Russia) Kavgolovo	15 km C	(Russia) Alexey Prokurorov	(Kazakhstan) Vladimir Smirnov	(Norway) Bjørn Dæhlie	
12	24 February 1996	(Norway) Trondheim	30 km F	(Kazakhstan) Vladimir Smirnov	(Norway) Bjørn Dæhlie	(Russia) Alexey Prokurorov	
13	3 March 1996	(Finland) Lahti	30 km F	(Finland) Jari Isometsä	(Norway) Bjørn Dæhlie	(Russia) Alexey Prokurorov	
14	9 March 1996	(Sweden) Falun	15 km C	(Kazakhstan) Vladimir Smirnov	(Norway) Bjørn Dæhlie	(Finland) Jari Isometsä	
15	10 March 1996	(Sweden) Falun	15 km C Pursuit	(Kazakhstan) Vladimir Smirnov	(Italy) Fulvio Valbusa	(Finland) Jari Isometsä	
16	16 March 1996	(Norway) Oslo	50 km C	(Norway) Erling Jevne	(Norway) Krister Sørgård	(Sweden) Anders Bergström	

=== Women ===
C – Classic / F – Freestyle
WC	Date	Place	Discipline	Winner	Second	Third	Ref.
1	25 November 1995	(Finland) Vuokatti	5 km C	(Russia) Lyubov Yegorova	(Russia) Yelena Välbe	(Norway) Marit Mikkelsplass	
2	29 November 1995	(Sweden) Gällivare	10 km F	(Italy) Stefania Belmondo	(Russia) Lyubov Yegorova	(Russia) Yelena Välbe	
3	9 December 1995	(Switzerland) Davos	5 km F	(Russia) Yelena Välbe	(Czech Republic) Kateřina Neumannová	(Italy) Manuela Di Centa	
4	10 December 1995	(Switzerland) Davos	10 km C Pursuit	(Russia) Lyubov Yegorova	(Russia) Yelena Välbe	(Russia) Larisa Lazutina	
5	13 December 1995	(Italy) Brusson	10 km F	(Russia) Yelena Välbe	(Russia) Lyubov Yegorova	(Russia) Nina Gavrylyuk	
6	17 December 1995	(Italy) Santa Caterina	10 km C	(Russia) Larisa Lazutina	(Russia) Lyubov Yegorova	(Russia) Nina Gavrylyuk	
7	9 January 1996	(Slovakia) Štrbské Pleso	30 km F	(Italy) Manuela Di Centa	(Russia) Yelena Välbe	(Italy) Stefania Belmondo	
8	13 January 1996	(Czech Republic) Nové Město	10 km C	(Russia) Yelena Välbe	(Italy) Manuela Di Centa	(Russia) Larisa Lazutina	
9	2 February 1996	(Austria) Seefeld	10 km F	(Italy) Manuela Di Centa	(Italy) Stefania Belmondo	(Russia) Yelena Välbe	
10	4 February 1996	(Germany) Reit im Winkl	Sprint F	(Russia) Yelena Välbe	(Norway) Anita Moen	(Czech Republic) Kateřina Neumannová	
11	11 February 1996	(Russia) Kavgolovo	10 km C	(Italy) Manuela Di Centa	(Russia) Larisa Lazutina	(Norway) Marit Mikkelsplass	
12	24 February 1996	(Norway) Trondheim	5 km C	(Italy) Manuela Di Centa	(Norway) Marit Mikkelsplass	(Russia) Larisa Lazutina	
13	25 February 1996	(Norway) Trondheim	10 km F Pursuit	(Italy) Manuela Di Centa	(Russia) Yelena Välbe	(Russia) Nina Gavrylyuk	
14	2 March 1996	(Finland) Lahti	10 km F	(Italy) Manuela Di Centa	(Italy) Stefania Belmondo	(Russia) Nina Gavrylyuk	
15	9 March 1996	(Sweden) Falun	15 km F	(Italy) Manuela Di Centa	(Russia) Yelena Välbe	(Russia) Nina Gavrylyuk	
16	16 March 1996	(Norway) Oslo	30 km C	(Russia) Nina Gavrylyuk	(Russia) Larisa Lazutina	(Norway) Marit Mikkelsplass	

=== Men's team ===
WC	Date	Place	Discipline	Winner	Second	Third	Ref.
1	10 December 1995	(Switzerland) Davos	4 × 10 km relay C	Finland Karri Hietamäki; Sami Repo; Mika Myllylä; Jari Isometsä	Norway I Sture Sivertsen; Erling Jevne; Bjørn Dæhlie; Thomas Alsgaard	Sweden I Morgan Göransson; Niklas Jonsson; Anders Bergström; Torgny Mogren	
2	14 January 1996	(Czech Republic) Nové Město	4 × 10 km relay C	Finland I Sami Repo; Mika Myllylä; Harri Kirvesniemi; Jari Isometsä	Norway I Thomas Alsgaard; Vegard Ulvang; Erling Jevne; Bjørn Dæhlie	Italy Fabio Maj; Giorgio Vanzetta; Fulvio Valbusa; Gaudenzio Godioz	
3	3 February 1996	(Austria) Seefeld	Team Sprint F	Italy Fulvio Valbusa; Silvio Fauner	Sweden I Niklas Jonsson; Torgny Mogren	Finland Mika Myllylä; Jari Isometsä	
4	25 February 1996	(Norway) Trondheim	4 × 10 km relay C/F	Norway I Vegard Ulvang; Erling Jevne; Bjørn Dæhlie; Thomas Alsgaard	Italy I Giorgio Di Centa; Marco Albarello; Fulvio Valbusa; Silvio Fauner	Sweden I Mathias Fredriksson; Niklas Jonsson; Anders Bergström; Torgny Mogren	
5	1 March 1996	(Finland) Lahti	4 × 10 km relay C/F	Italy Marco Albarello; Silvio Fauner; Fabio Maj; Fulvio Valbusa	Russia I Sergey Chepikov; Mikhail Botvinov; Sergey Tchernych; Alexey Prokurorov	Norway Kristen Skjeldal; Anders Eide; Egil Kristiansen; Thomas Alsgaard	
6	17 March 1996	(Norway) Oslo	4 × 5 km relay F	Norway II Tore Bjonviken; Frode Estil; Remi Andersen; Tor Arne Hetland	Norway I Egil Kristiansen; Vegard Ulvang; Anders Eide; Bjørn Dæhlie	Finland Ari Palolahti; Sami Repo; Markus Vuorenmaa; Jari Isometsä	

=== Women's team ===
WC	Date	Place	Discipline	Winner	Second	Third	Ref.
1	17 December 1995	(Italy) Santa Caterina	4 × 5 km relay C	Russia I Larisa Lazutina; Nina Gavrylyuk; Lyubov Yegorova; Yelena Välbe	Italy I Cristina Paluselli; Stefania Belmondo; Gabriella Paruzzi; Manuela Di Centa	Russia II Svetlana Nageykina; Yuliya Chepalova; Natalya Baranova-Masalkina; Olga Zavyalova	
2	14 January 1996	(Czech Republic) Nové Město	4 × 5 km relay C	Russia Svetlana Nageykina; Larisa Lazutina; Nina Gavrylyuk; Yelena Välbe	Norway Anita Moen; Bente Martinsen; Marit Mikkelsplass; Trude Dybendahl	Italy Cristina Paluselli; Stefania Belmondo; Gabriella Paruzzi; Manuela Di Centa	
3	3 February 1996	(Austria) Seefeld	Team Sprint F	Italy Stefania Belmondo; Manuela Di Centa	Norway Trude Dybendahl; Anita Moen	Russia I Yelena Välbe; Olga Zavyalova	
4	10 March 1996	(Sweden) Falun	4 × 5 km relay C/F	Russia I Nina Gavrylyuk; Larisa Lazutina; Lyubov Yegorova; Yelena Välbe	Norway Bente Martinsen; Marit Mikkelsplass; Trude Dybendahl; Anita Moen	Italy I Barbara Giacomuzzi; Manuela Di Centa; Guidina Dal Sasso; Stefania Belmondo	
5	17 March 1996	(Norway) Oslo	4 × 5 km relay C/F	Russia Svetlana Nageykina; Larisa Lazutina; Olga Zavyalova; Nina Gavrylyuk	Finland Riikka Sirviö; Tuulikki Pyykkönen; Kati Pulkkinen; Anu Kittilä	Norway I Bente Martinsen; Marit Mikkelsplass; Maj Helen Sorkmo; Anita Moen	

== Men's overall standings ==
Rank	after all 16 events	Points
1	(Norway) Bjørn Dæhlie	1110
2	(Kazakhstan) Vladimir Smirnov	1034
3	(Finland) Jari Isometsä	617
4	(Russia) Alexey Prokurorov	544
5	(Italy) Silvio Fauner	508
6	(Italy) Fulvio Valbusa	482
7	(Russia) Mikhail Botvinov	401
8	(Norway) Thomas Alsgaard	352
9	(Sweden) Torgny Mogren	312
	(Germany) Johann Mühlegg	312

Rank		Points
11	(Norway) Anders Eide	286
12	(Norway) Vegard Ulvang	253
13	(Sweden) Anders Bergström	252
14	(Finland) Mika Myllylä	238
15	(Norway) Erling Jevne	220
16	(Sweden) Niklas Jonsson	218
17	(Austria) Markus Gandler	178
	(Finland) Sami Repo	178
19	(Russia) Sergey Chepikov	164
20	(Norway) Sture Sivertsen	158

Rank		Points
21	(Finland) Harri Kirvesniemi	149
22	(Italy) Giorgio Di Centa	142
23	(Liechtenstein) Markus Hasler	138
24	(Sweden) Henrik Forsberg	134
	(Austria) Alois Stadlober	134
26	(Italy) Gaudenzio Godioz	126
27	(Norway) Krister Sørgård	123
28	(Italy) Giorgio Vanzetta	120
29	(Italy) Fabio Maj	101
30	(Czech Republic) Luboš Buchta	96

== Women's overall standings ==
Rank	after all 16 events	Points
1	(Italy) Manuela Di Centa	1004
2	(Russia) Yelena Välbe	945
3	(Russia) Larisa Lazutina	732
4	(Russia) Nina Gavrylyuk	717
5	(Russia) Lyubov Yegorova	690
6	(Italy) Stefania Belmondo	675
7	(Norway) Marit Mikkelsplass	579
8	(Czech Republic) Kateřina Neumannová	419
9	(Ukraine) Iryna Taranenko-Terelia	340
10	(Norway) Anita Moen	330

Rank		Points
11	(Russia) Olga Zavyalova	324
12	(Norway) Bente Martinsen	291
13	—N/a	—N/a
14	(Norway) Trude Dybendahl	235
	(Russia) Yuliya Chepalova	235
16	(Russia) Natalya Baranova-Masalkina	210
17	(Estonia) Kristina Šmigun	206
18	(France) Sophie Villeneuve	184
19	(Switzerland) Sylvia Honegger	159
20	(Italy) Gabriella Paruzzi	156

Rank		Points
21	(Finland) Tuulikki Pyykkönen	147
22	(Japan) Fumiko Aoki	131
23	(Austria) Maria Theurl	114
24	(Switzerland) Brigitte Albrecht Loretan	113
	(Finland) Kati Pulkkinen	113
26	(Norway) Maj Helen Sorkmo	98
27	(Finland) Anu Kittilä	95
28	(Germany) Anke Reschwamm Schulze	91
29	(Sweden) Annika Evaldsson	86
30	(Italy) Guidina Dal Sasso	85

== Achievements ==
Victories in this World Cup (all-time number of victories as of 1995/96 season in parentheses)

Men

- Bjørn Dæhlie (NOR), 6 (30) first places
- Vladimir Smirnov (KAZ), 6 (28) first places
- Alexey Prokurorov (RUS), 1 (7) first place
- Tor Arne Hetland (NOR), 1 (1) first place
- Erling Jevne (NOR), 1 (1) first place
- Jari Isometsä (FIN), 1 (1) first place

Women

- Manuela Di Centa (ITA), 7 (15) first places
- Yelena Välbe (RUS), 4 (37) first places
- Lyubov Yegorova (RUS), 2 (13) first places
- Larisa Lazutina (RUS), 1 (8) first place
- Nina Gavrylyuk (RUS), 1 (3) first place
- Stefania Belmondo (ITA), 1 (10) first place
