= Hervé Balland =

French cross-country skier (born 1964)

Personal information
- Born: 7 January 1964 (age 62) Champagnole, France

Sport
- Sport: Skiing
- Club: SC Morbier-Bellefontaine

World Cup career
- Seasons: 9 – (1990–1998)
- Indiv. starts: 26
- Indiv. podiums: 2
- Indiv. wins: 0
- Team starts: 6
- Team podiums: 0
- Overall titles: 0 – (23rd in 1993)
- Discipline titles: 0
Medal record
Men's cross-country skiing
Representing France
World Championships
Silver medal – second place	1993 Falun	50 km freestyle

Hervé Balland (born January 7, 1964) is a French cross-country skier who competed from 1990 to 1998. He won a silver medal in the 50 km event at the 1993 FIS Nordic World Ski Championships in Falun.

Balland's best finish at the Winter Olympics was a fifth in the 50 km event at the 1992 Games in Albertville. He won the Engadin Skimarathon in 1993, 1994 and 1996, and a 15 km event in Germany in 1994.

== Cross-country skiing results ==
All results are sourced from the International Ski Federation (FIS).

=== Olympic Games ===
Year	Age	10 km	Pursuit	30 km	50 km	4 × 10 km relay
1992	28	—	—	—	5	8
1994	30	—	—	DNF	—	10
1998	34	—	—	—	14	13

=== World Championships ===
- 1 medal – (1 silver)

Year	Age	10 km	15 km	Pursuit	30 km	50 km	4 × 10 km relay
1991	27	—	29	—N/a	—	15	9
1993	29	—	—N/a	—	—	Silver	10
1995	31	—	—N/a	—	—	10	8
1997	33	62	—N/a	41	15	—	—

=== World Cup ===
==== Season standings ====
Season	Age	Overall	Long Distance	Sprint
1990	26	43	—N/a	—N/a
1991	27	NC	—N/a	—N/a
1992	28	29	—N/a	—N/a
1993	29	23	—N/a	—N/a
1994	30	25	—N/a	—N/a
1995	31	37	—N/a	—N/a
1996	32	57	—N/a	—N/a
1997	33	64	NC	—
1998	34	NC	NC	—

==== Individual podiums ====
- 2 podiums

No.	Season	Date	Location	Race	Level	Place
1	1992–93	27 February 1993	Falun, Sweden	50 km Individual F	World Championships^{[1]}	2nd
2	1993–94	19 March 1994	Thunder Bay, Canada	50 km Individual F	World Cup	2nd

Note: ^{1} Until the 1999 World Championships, World Championship races were included in the World Cup scoring system.
