= Jochen Behle =

German cross-country skier

Personal information
- Nationality: Germany
- Born: 7 July 1960 (age 66) Korbach, West Germany

Sport
- Sport: Skiing
- Club: SC Monte Kaolino Hirschau

World Cup career
- Seasons: 15 – (1982–1984, 1986, 1988–1998)
- Indiv. starts: 93
- Indiv. podiums: 5
- Indiv. wins: 1
- Team starts: 20
- Team podiums: 0
- Overall titles: 0 – (4th in 1990)
- Discipline titles: 0

Jochen Behle (born 7 July 1960 in Korbach, Hesse) is a former (West) German cross-country skier who competed from 1980 to 1998.

Competing in six Winter Olympics, he earned his best career finish of fourth in the 4 × 10 km relay at Lillehammer in 1994 and his best individual finish of 11th in the 10 km event at those same games.

Behle's best finish at the FIS Nordic World Ski Championships was fifth in the 10 km event at Falun in 1993. His only World Cup victory was in a 50 km event in Canada in 1989.

In West Germany, the phrase "Wo ist Behle?" ("Where is Behle?") became famous when during a TV broadcast of the 1980 Olympic Games in Lake Placid, the commentator couldn't find Behle and worriedly repeated this question.

== Cross-country skiing results ==
All results are sourced from the International Ski Federation (FIS).

=== Olympic Games ===
Year	Age	10 km	15 km	Pursuit	30 km	50 km	4 × 10 km relay
1980	19	—N/a	12	—N/a	—	—	4
1984	23	—N/a	DNF	—N/a	15	DNS	6
1988	27	—N/a	23	—N/a	23	—	7
1992	31	24	—N/a	DNS	15	—	6
1994	33	11	—N/a	14	—	DNF	4
1998	37	40	—N/a	DNS	DNF	—	8

=== World Championships ===
Year	Age	10 km	15 km classical	15 km freestyle	Pursuit	30 km	50 km	4 × 10 km relay
1982	21	—N/a	7	—N/a	—N/a	17	—	6
1987	26	—N/a	—	—N/a	—N/a	23	—	11
1989	28	—N/a	46	6	—N/a	8	DNF	10
1991	30	15	—N/a	—	—N/a	11	—	10
1993	32	5	—N/a	—N/a	9	9	—	5
1995	34	7	—N/a	—N/a	DNS	10	—	7
1997	36	19	—N/a	—N/a	DNF	—	DNF	6

=== World Cup ===
==== Season standings ====
Season	Age			
Season	Age	Overall	Long Distance	Sprint
1982	21	6	—N/a	—N/a
1983	22	24	—N/a	—N/a
1984	23	24	—N/a	—N/a
1986	25	15	—N/a	—N/a
1988	27	43	—N/a	—N/a
1989	28	21	—N/a	—N/a
1990	29	4	—N/a	—N/a
1991	30	37	—N/a	—N/a
1992	31	19	—N/a	—N/a
1993	32	24	—N/a	—N/a
1994	33	27	—N/a	—N/a
1995	34	22	—N/a	—N/a
1996	35	36	—N/a	—N/a
1997	36	26	55	22
1998	37	58	NC	47

==== Individual podiums ====
- 1 victory
- 5 podiums

No.	Season	Date	Location	Race	Level	Place
1	1981–82	19 March 1982	Štrbské Pleso, Czechoslovakia	15 km Individual	World Cup	3rd
2	1983–84	10 December 1983	Reit im Winkl, West Germany	15 km Individual	World Cup	3rd
3	1989–90	9 December 1989	Soldier Hollow, United States	15 km Individual C	World Cup	3rd
4	1989–90	17 December 1989	Canmore, Canada	50 km Individual C	World Cup	1st
5	1989–90	25 February 1990	Reit im Winkl, West Germany	30 km Individual F	World Cup	3rd
