= Maj Helen Sorkmo =

Norwegian cross-country skier

Personal information
- Nationality: Norway
- Born: 14 August 1969 (age 56) Os, Hedmark, Norway

Sport
- Sport: Skiing
- Club: Os IL

World Cup career
- Seasons: 13 – (1991–2003)
- Indiv. starts: 130
- Indiv. podiums: 4
- Indiv. wins: 0
- Team starts: 29
- Team podiums: 9
- Team wins: 2
- Overall titles: 0 – (12th in 2000)
- Discipline titles: 0

Maj Helen Sorkmo (born 14 August 1969) is a Norwegian cross-country skier who competed from 1992 to 2003. She earned two World Cup victories, both in the 4 × 5 km relay in 2002.

Sorkmo also competed in two Winter Olympics, earning her best finish of sixth in the sprint event at Salt Lake City in 2002. Her best finish at the FIS Nordic World Ski Championships was 14th twice (sprint: 2003, 5 km: 1999).

== Cross-country skiing results ==
All results are sourced from the International Ski Federation (FIS).

=== Olympic Games ===
Year	Age	5 km	10 km	15 km	Pursuit	30 km	Sprint	4 × 5 km relay
1998	28	—	—N/a	—	—	19	—N/a	—
2002	32	—N/a	—	DNF	—	—	6	—

=== World Championships ===
Year	Age	5 km	10 km	15 km	Pursuit	30 km	Sprint	4 × 5 km relay
1997	27	—	—N/a	32	—	—	—N/a	—
1999	29	14	—N/a	24	20	16	—N/a	4
2003	33	—N/a	26	—	—	—	14	—

=== World Cup ===
==== Season standings ====
Season	Age				
Season	Age	Overall	Long Distance	Middle Distance	Sprint
1991	21	NC	—N/a	—N/a	—N/a
1992	22	NC	—N/a	—N/a	—N/a
1993	23	NC	—N/a	—N/a	—N/a
1994	24	52	—N/a	—N/a	—N/a
1995	25	40	—N/a	—N/a	—N/a
1996	26	26	—N/a	—N/a	—N/a
1997	27	33	45	—N/a	21
1998	28	24	31	—N/a	20
1999	29	23	22	—N/a	12
2000	30	12	23	21	5
2001	31	38	—N/a	—N/a	31
2002	32	24	—N/a	—N/a	7
2003	33	22	—N/a	—N/a	8

==== Individual podiums ====
- 4 podiums

No.	Season	Date	Location	Race	Level	Place
1	1998–99	28 December 1998	Engelberg, Switzerland	1.0 km Sprint F	World Cup	2nd
2	1999–00	29 December 1999	Kitzbühel, Austria	1.5 km Sprint F	World Cup	2nd
3	2001–02	27 December 2001	Garmisch-Partenkirchen, Germany	1.5 km Sprint F	World Cup	3rd
4	2002–03	11 December 2002	Clusone, Italy	1.5 km Sprint F	World Cup	3rd

==== Team podiums ====
- 2 victories
- 9 podiums

No.	Season	Date	Location	Race	Level	Place	Teammates
1	1994–95	15 January 1995	Nové Město, Czech Republic	4 × 5 km Relay C	World Cup	2nd	Nybråten / Mikkelsplass / Uglem
2	1995–96	17 March 1996	Oslo, Norway	4 × 5 km Relay C/F	World Cup	2nd	Martinsen / Mikkelsplass / Moen
3	1996–97	9 March 1997	Falun, Sweden	4 × 5 km Relay C/F	World Cup	2nd	Martinsen / Dybendahl-Hartz / Nilsen
4	1998–99	29 November 1998	Muonio, Finland	4 × 5 km Relay F	World Cup	3rd	Martinsen / Nilsen / Moen
5	1998–99	10 January 1999	Nové Město, Czech Republic	4 x 5 km Relay C/F	World Cup	2nd	Moen / Nilsen / Martinsen
6	1999–00	19 December 1999	Davos, Switzerland	4 × 5 km Relay C	World Cup	3rd	Bay / Roaldseth / Schei
7	1999–00	13 January 2000	Nové Město, Czech Republic	4 × 5 km Relay C/F	World Cup	3rd	Moen / Martinsen / Nilsen
8	2002–03	24 November 2002	Kiruna, Sweden	4 × 5 km Relay C/F	World Cup	1st	Moen / Skari / Skofterud
9	2002–03	8 December 2002	Davos, Switzerland	4 × 5 km Relay C/F	World Cup	1st	Skofterud / Skari / Pedersen
