= Alfred Runggaldier =

Italian cross-country skier

Personal information
- Nationality: Italy
- Born: 3 January 1962 (age 64) Brixen, Italy

Sport
- Sport: Skiing
- Club: C.S. Carabinieri

World Cup career
- Seasons: 9 – (1984, 1986–1993)
- Indiv. starts: 21
- Indiv. podiums: 1
- Indiv. wins: 0
- Team starts: 4
- Team podiums: 1
- Team wins: 1
- Overall titles: 0 – (22nd in 1990)

Alfred Runggaldier (born 3 January 1962) is a former Italian cross-country skier who competed from 1984 to 1994. His best finish at the Winter Olympics was seventh in the 4 × 10 km event at Sarajevo in 1984 while his best individual finish was 11th in the 50 km event at Albertville in 1992.

Runggaldier's best World Cup career finish was third in a 50 km event in Norway in 1990.

== Cross-country skiing results ==
All results are sourced from the International Ski Federation (FIS).

=== Olympic Games ===
Year	Age	10 km	15 km	Pursuit	30 km	50 km	4 × 10 km relay
1984	22	—N/a	—	—N/a	DSQ	—	7
1992	30	—	—N/a	—	—	11	—

=== World Championships ===
Year	Age	10 km	15 km classical	15 km freestyle	30 km	50 km	4 × 10 km relay
1989	27	—N/a	—	45	—	DNF	—
1991	29	—	—N/a	—	—	18	—

=== World Cup ===
==== Season standings ====
Season	Age	Overall
1984	22	NC
1986	24	41
1987	25	40
1988	26	48
1989	27	53
1990	28	22
1991	29	27
1992	30	30
1993	31	NC

==== Individual podiums ====
- 1 podium

No.	Season	Date	Location	Race	Level	Place
1	1989–90	17 March 1990	Vang, Norway	50 km Individual F	World Cup	3rd

==== Team podiums ====
- 1 victory
- 1 podium

No.	Season	Date	Location	Race	Level	Place	Teammates
1	1989–90	1 March 1990	Lahti, Finland	4 × 10 km Relay	World Cup	1st	Fauner / De Zolt / Vanzetta
