= Marit Elveos =

Norwegian cross-country skier

Personal information
- Nationality: Norway
- Born: 4 May 1965 (age 61) Steigen, Norway

Sport
- Sport: Skiing
- Club: Bodø & Omegn IL

World Cup career
- Seasons: 10 – (1984–1988, 1990–1994)
- Indiv. starts: 30
- Indiv. podiums: 0
- Team starts: 2
- Team podiums: 2
- Team wins: 0
- Overall titles: 0 – (15th in 1990)
Medal record
Women's cross-country skiing
Representing Norway
Junior World Championships
Gold medal – first place	1984 Trondheim	3 × 5 km relay

Marit Elveos (born 4 May 1965, in Steigen) is a Norwegian cross-country skier. She represented the club Bodø & Omegn IL. She competed at the 1988 Winter Olympics in Calgary.

== Cross-country skiing results ==
All results are sourced from the International Ski Federation (FIS).

=== Olympic Games ===
Year	Age	5 km	10 km	20 km	4 × 5 km relay
1988	22	—	—	18	—

=== World Championships ===
Year	Age	5 km	10 km	15 km	30 km	4 × 5 km relay
1991	25	—	36	29	33	—

=== World Cup ===
==== Season standings ====
Season	Age	Overall
1984	19	49
1985	20	44
1986	21	44
1987	22	34
1988	23	30
1990	25	15
1991	26	29
1992	27	NC
1993	28	36
1994	29	63

==== Team podiums ====
- 2 podiums

No.	Season	Date	Location	Race	Level	Place	Teammates
1	1987–88	13 March 1988	Falun, Sweden	4 × 5 km Relay C	World Cup	3rd	Wold / Bøe / Pedersen
2	1990–91	15 March 1991	Oslo, Norway	4 × 5 km Relay C/F	World Cup	3rd	Wold / Hegge / Skeime
