= Sigurd Brørs =

Norwegian cross-country skier

Personal information
- Nationality: Norway
- Born: 16 July 1968 (age 58) Møre og Romsdal, Norway

Sport
- Sport: Skiing
- Club: Surnadal IL

World Cup career
- Seasons: 7 – (1990–1996)
- Indiv. starts: 27
- Indiv. podiums: 1
- Indiv. wins: 0
- Team starts: 5
- Team podiums: 0
- Overall titles: 0 – (27th in 1992)

Sigurd Brørs (born 16 July 1968 in Møre og Romsdal) is a Norwegian cross-country skier who competed from 1992 to 1997. His best World Cup finish was third at a 15 km race in Italy in 1992. His club was Surnadal IL.

== Cross-country skiing results ==
All results are sourced from the International Ski Federation (FIS).

=== World Championships ===
Year	Age	10 km	Pursuit	30 km	50 km	4 × 10 km relay
1993	24	—	—	—	DNF	—

=== World Cup ===
==== Season standings ====
Season	Age	Overall
1990	21	NC
1991	22	NC
1992	23	27
1993	24	33
1994	25	46
1995	26	49
1996	27	52

==== Individual podiums ====
- 1 podium

No.	Season	Date	Location	Race	Level	Place
1	1991–92	11 January 1992	Cogne, Italy	15 km Individual F	World Cup	3rd
