= Gianfranco Polvara =

Italian cross-country skier

Personal information
- Nationality: Italy
- Born: 29 January 1958 (age 68) Bellano, Italy

Sport
- Sport: Skiing
- Club: C.S. Esercito

World Cup career
- Seasons: 14 – (1982–1995)
- Indiv. starts: 65
- Indiv. podiums: 2
- Indiv. wins: 0
- Team starts: 3
- Team podiums: 0
- Overall titles: 0 – (12th in 1991)

Gianfranco Polvara (born 29 January 1958) is an Italian former cross-country skier who competed from 1982 to 1995. He finished seventh in the 15 km event at the 1988 Winter Olympics in Calgary.

At the 1993 FIS Nordic World Ski Championships in Falun, Polvara finished fourth in the 50 km event. His best World Cup finish was third twice in 30 km events, both in 1991.

== Cross-country skiing results ==
All results are sourced from the International Ski Federation (FIS).

=== Olympic Games ===
Year	Age	10 km	15 km	Pursuit	30 km	50 km	4 × 10 km relay
1980	22	—N/a	—	—N/a	—	32	—
1984	26	—N/a	34	—N/a	—	21	—
1988	30	—N/a	13	—N/a	7	10	—
1992	34	—	—N/a	—	20	10	—
1994	36	—	—N/a	—	DSQ	31	—

=== World Championships ===
Year	Age	10 km	15 km classical	15 km freestyle	Pursuit	30 km	50 km	4 × 10 km relay
1982	24	—N/a	—	—N/a	—N/a	—	20	—
1985	27	—N/a	—	—N/a	—N/a	20	13	—
1987	29	—N/a	13	—N/a	—N/a	15	—	—
1989	31	—N/a	—	—	—N/a	23	22	—
1991	33	—	—N/a	—	—N/a	30	11	—
1993	35	—	—N/a	—N/a	—	—	4	—

=== World Cup ===
==== Season standings ====
Season	Age	Overall
1982	24	74
1983	25	NC
1984	26	NC
1985	27	30
1986	28	18
1987	29	30
1988	30	20
1989	31	57
1990	32	20
1991	33	12
1992	34	27
1993	35	17
1994	36	28
1995	37	79

==== Individual podiums ====
- 2 podiums

No.	Season	Date	Location	Race	Level	Place
1	1990–91	9 January 1991	Štrbské Pleso, Czechoslovakia	30 km Individual F	World Cup	3rd
2	1990–91	3 March 1991	Lahti, Finland	30 km Individual F	World Cup	3rd
