= Hilde Glomsås =

Norwegian cross-country skier

Personal information
- Nationality: Norway
- Born: 26 April 1978 (age 48)

Sport
- Sport: Skiing
- Club: Bærums Verk IF

World Cup career
- Seasons: 4 – (1998–2001)
- Indiv. starts: 12
- Indiv. podiums: 0
- Team starts: 7
- Team podiums: 2
- Team wins: 0
- Overall titles: 0 – (31st in 1999)
- Discipline titles: 0
Medal record
Women's cross-country skiing
Representing Norway
Junior World Championships
Gold medal – first place	1998 Pontresina	15 km classical
Bronze medal – third place	1997 Canmore	4 × 5 km relay

Hilde Glomsås (born 26 April 1978) is a retired Norwegian cross-country skier.

She competed at the 1996, 1997 and 1998 Junior World Championships, winning the gold medal in the 15 km race in 1998.

She made her World Cup debut in the 1997–98 season opener at Beitostølen, finishing 35th. She collected her first World Cup points with a 15th place in the December 1998 Davos 10 km, and improved to a 12th place in January 2000 in Nové Město na Moravě. Her last World Cup outing came in December 2000 in Brusson, where she finished 34th. Her strongest placement came in the 30 km race at the 1999 World Championships, where she finished 7th.

She represented the sports clubs Bærums Verk IF, growing up at Rykkinn.

== Cross-country skiing results ==
All results are sourced from the International Ski Federation (FIS).

=== World Championships ===
Year	Age	5 km	15 km	Pursuit	30 km	4 × 5 km relay
1999	20	—	—	—	7	—

=== World Cup ===
==== Season standings ====
Season	Age				
Season	Age	Overall	Long Distance	Middle Distance	Sprint
1998	19	NC	—	—N/a	NC
1999	20	31	21	—N/a	63
2000	21	48	40	41	61
2001	22	NC	—N/a	—N/a	—

==== Team podiums ====
- 2 podiums – (2 RL)

No.	Season	Date	Location	Race	Level	Place	Teammates
1	1998–99	21 March 1999	Oslo, Norway	4 × 5 km Relay C	World Cup	3rd	Skari / Nilsen / Moen
2	1999–00	19 December 1999	Davos, Switzerland	4 × 5 km Relay C	World Cup	2nd	Moen / Nilsen / Skari
