= Marit Mikkelsplass =

Norwegian cross-country skier

Personal information
- Full name: Marit Elisabeth Mikkelsplass
- Nationality: Norway
- Born: Marit Elisabeth Wold; 22 February 1965 (age 61) Oslo, Norway
- Spouse: Pål Gunnar Mikkelsplass (m. 1994)

Sport
- Sport: Skiing
- Club: Kjelsås IL

World Cup career
- Seasons: 14 – (1985–1998)
- Indiv. starts: 87
- Indiv. podiums: 11
- Indiv. wins: 2
- Team starts: 18
- Team podiums: 18
- Team wins: 3
- Overall titles: 0 – (5th in 1998)
- Discipline titles: 0
Medal record
Women's cross-country skiing
Representing Norway
Olympic Games
Silver medal – second place	1988 Calgary	4 × 5 km relay
Silver medal – second place	1994 Lillehammer	30 km classical
Silver medal – second place	1998 Nagano	4 × 5 km relay
World Championships
Silver medal – second place	1995 Thunder Bay	4 × 5 km relay
Silver medal – second place	1997 Trondheim	4 × 5 km relay
Bronze medal – third place	1997 Trondheim	30 km classical

Marit Elisabeth Mikkelsplass (born Marit Wold on 22 February 1965) is a Norwegian former cross-country skier who competed from 1985 to 1998. She represented Kjelsås IL in Oslo. Today she is married to former Norwegian cross-country skier Pål Gunnar Mikkelsplass.

Mikkelsplass has three silver medals from the Winter Olympics, earning them in the 30 km (1994) and the 4 × 5 km relay (1988, 1998). She also has three medals from the FIS Nordic World Ski Championships kraa two silvers (4 × 5 km relay: 1995, 1997) and a bronze (30 km: 1997).

== Cross-country skiing results ==
All results are sourced from the International Ski Federation (FIS).

=== Olympic Games ===
- 3 medals – (3 silver)

Year	Age	5 km	10 km	15 km	Pursuit	20 km	30 km	4 × 5 km relay
1988	23	—	15	—N/a	—N/a	24	—N/a	Silver
1994	29	—	—N/a	14	—	—N/a	Silver	—
1998	33	6	—N/a	5	14	—N/a	9	Silver

=== World Championships ===
- 3 medals – (2 silver, 1 bronze)

Year	Age	5 km	10 km classical	10 km freestyle	15 km	Pursuit	30 km	4 × 5 km relay
1989	24	—N/a	—	21	10	—N/a	—	—
1993	28	—	—N/a	—N/a	—	—	21	—
1995	30	7	—N/a	—N/a	4	7	9	Silver
1997	32	22	—N/a	—N/a	—	10	Bronze	Silver

=== World Cup ===
==== Season standings ====
Season	Age			
Season	Age	Overall	Long Distance	Sprint
1985	20	54	—N/a	—N/a
1986	21	22	—N/a	—N/a
1987	22	NC	—N/a	—N/a
1988	23	16	—N/a	—N/a
1989	24	42	—N/a	—N/a
1990	25	30	—N/a	—N/a
1991	26	32	—N/a	—N/a
1992	27	29	—N/a	—N/a
1993	28	16	—N/a	—N/a
1994	29	11	—N/a	—N/a
1995	30	8	—N/a	—N/a
1996	31	7	—N/a	—N/a
1997	32	7	4	13
1998	33	5	6	5

==== Individual podiums ====
- 2 victories
- 11 podiums

No.	Season	Date	Location	Race	Level	Place
1	1985–86	8 March 1986	Falun, Sweden	30 km Individual C	World Cup	3rd
2	1987–88	17 March 1988	Oslo, Norway	30 km Mass Start C	World Cup	3rd
3	1993–94	24 February 1994	Lillehammer, Norway	30 km Individual C	Olympic Games^{[1]}	2nd
4	1994–95	28 January 1995	Lahti, Finland	10 km Individual C	World Cup	2nd
5	1995–96	25 November 1995	Vuokatti, Finland	5 km Individual C	World Cup	3rd
6	1995–96	11 February 1996	Kavgolovo, Russia	10 km Individual C	World Cup	3rd
7	1995–96	24 February 1996	Trondheim, Norway	5 km Individual C	World Cup	2nd
8	1995–96	16 March 1996	Oslo, Norway	30 km Individual C	World Cup	3rd
9	1996–97	18 January 1997	Lahti, Finland	15 km Individual C	World Cup	1st
10	1996–97	1 March 1997	Trondheim, Norway	30 km Individual C	World Championships^{[1]}	3rd
11	1997–98	8 January 1998	Ramsau, Austria	10 km Individual C	World Cup	1st

==== Team podiums ====
- 3 victories
- 18 podiums

No.	Season	Date	Location	Race	Level	Place	Teammates
1	1987–88	21 February 1988	Calgary, Canada	4 × 5 km Relay F	Olympic Games^{[1]}	2nd	Dybendahl-Hartz / Jahren / Dahlmo
2	1987–88	13 March 1988	Falun, Sweden	4 × 5 km Relay C	World Cup	1st	Elveos / Bøe / Pedersen
3	1990–91	15 March 1991	Oslo, Norway	4 × 5 km Relay C/F	World Cup	3rd	Elveos / Hegge / Skeime
4	1993–94	4 March 1994	Lahti, Finland	4 × 5 km Relay C	World Cup	1st	Moen / Nybråten / Dybendahl-Hartz
5	1993–94	13 March 1994	Falun, Sweden	4 × 5 km Relay F	World Cup	2nd	Moen / Nybråten / Dybendahl-Hartz
6	1994–95	15 January 1995	Nové Město, Czech Republic	4 × 5 km Relay C	World Cup	2nd	Nybråten / Uglem / Sorkmo
7	1994–95	12 February 1995	Oslo, Norway	4 × 5 km Relay C/F	World Cup	2nd	Nybråten / Nilsen / Moen
8	1994–95	17 March 1995	Thunder Bay, Canada	4 × 5 km Relay C/F	World Championships^{[1]}	2nd	Nybråten / Nilsen / Moen
9	1994–95	26 March 1995	Sapporo, Japan	4 × 5 km Relay C/F	World Cup	2nd	Dybendahl-Hartz / Nybråten / Nilsen
10	1995–96	14 January 1996	Nové Město, Czech Republic	4 × 5 km Relay C	World Cup	2nd	Moen / Martinsen / Dybendahl-Hartz
11	1995–96	10 March 1996	Falun, Sweden	4 × 5 km Relay C/F	World Cup	2nd	Martinsen / Dybendahl-Hartz / Moen
12	1995–96	17 March 1996	Oslo, Norway	4 × 5 km Relay C/F	World Cup	3rd	Martinsen / Sorkmo / Moen
13	1996–97	23 November 1996	Kiruna, Sweden	4 × 5 km Relay C	World Cup	2nd	Dybendahl-Hartz / Moen / Martinsen
14	1996–97	8 December 1996	Davos, Switzerland	4 × 5 km Relay C	World Cup	1st	Martinsen / Moen / Dybendahl-Hartz
15	1996–97	28 February 1997	Trondheim, Norway	4 × 5 km Relay C/F	World Championships^{[1]}	2nd	Martinsen / Nilsen / Dybendahl-Hartz
16	1996–97	16 March 1997	Oslo, Norway	4 × 5 km Relay F	World Cup	2nd	Moen / Nilsen / Dybendahl-Hartz
17	1997–98	23 November 1997	Beitostølen, Norway	4 × 5 km Relay C	World Cup	2nd	Moen / Dybendahl-Hartz / Martinsen
18	1997–98	6 March 1998	Lahti, Finland	4 × 5 km Relay C/F	World Cup	2nd	Martinsen / Nilsen / Dybendahl-Hartz

Note: ^{1} Until the 1999 World Championships and the 1994 Olympics, World Championship and Olympic races were included in the World Cup scoring system.
