= Skjeldal =

Skjeldal is a Norwegian surname. Notable people with the surname include:

- Gudmund Skjeldal (born 1970), Norwegian cross-country skier and writer
- Kristen Skjeldal (born 1967), Norwegian cross-country skier
