= Polvara =

Polvara is a given name. Notable people with the name include:

- Dante Polvara (born 2000), American soccer player
- Gianfranco Polvara (born 1958), Italian former cross-country skier
