= Anita Moen =

Norwegian cross-country skier

Personal information
- Nationality: Norway
- Born: 31 August 1967 (age 59) Elverum, Norway

Sport
- Sport: Skiing
- Club: Trysilgutten IL

World Cup career
- Seasons: 15 – (1987–1989, 1992–2003)
- Indiv. starts: 134
- Indiv. podiums: 20
- Indiv. wins: 3
- Team starts: 36
- Team podiums: 29
- Team wins: 5
- Overall titles: 0 – (4th in 1998)
- Discipline titles: 0
Medal record
Women's cross-country skiing
Representing Norway
Olympic Games
Silver medal – second place	1994 Lillehammer	4 × 5 km relay
Silver medal – second place	1998 Nagano	4 × 5 km relay
Silver medal – second place	2002 Salt Lake City	4 × 5 km relay
Bronze medal – third place	1998 Nagano	15 km classical
Bronze medal – third place	2002 Salt Lake City	Individual sprint
World Championships
Silver medal – second place	1995 Thunder Bay	4 × 5 km relay
Silver medal – second place	2001 Lahti	4 × 5 km relay
Silver medal – second place	2003 Val di Fiemme	4 × 5 km relay
Bronze medal – third place	1993 Falun	4 × 5 km relay

Anita Moen (born 31 August 1967), sometimes credited as Anita Moen-Guidon, is a Norwegian former cross-country skier who competed from 1987 to 2003. She won five medals at the Winter Olympics with three silvers (4 × 5 km relay: 1994, 1998, 2002) and two bronzes (15 km: 1998, Individual sprint: 2002).

Moen also won four 4 × 5 km relay medals at the FIS Nordic World Ski Championships with three silvers (1995, 2001, 2003) and one bronze (1993). Her best individual finish at the World Championships was fifth in the 30 km event in 1997.

Moen won eighteen races in her career at all levels from 1992 to 2002. In 2001, she won the Tjejvasan.

Moen now has a ski academy, where she teaches skiing.

== Cross-country skiing results ==
All results are sourced from the International Ski Federation (FIS).

=== Olympic Games ===
- 5 medals – (3 silver, 2 bronze)

Year	Age	5 km	10 km	15 km	Pursuit	30 km	Sprint	4 × 5 km relay
1994	26	4	—N/a	10	8	10	—N/a	Silver
1998	30	7	—N/a	Bronze	8	—	—N/a	Silver
2002	34	—N/a	9	—	—	4	Bronze	Silver

=== World Championships ===
- 4 medals – (3 silver, 1 bronze)

Year	Age	5 km	10 km	15 km	Pursuit	30 km	Sprint	4 × 5 km relay
1993	25	9	—N/a	9	8	DNF	—N/a	Bronze
1995	27	21	—N/a	—	11	DNF	—N/a	Silver
1997	29	16	—N/a	—	11	5	—N/a	—
1999	31	32	—N/a	—	DNF	—	—N/a	4
2001	33	—N/a	—	12	—	CNX^{[a]}	7	Silver
2003	35	—N/a	—	DNF	29	—	8	Silver

a. ^{1} Cancelled due to extremely cold weather.

=== World Cup ===
==== Season standings ====
Season	Age				
Season	Age	Overall	Long Distance	Middle Distance	Sprint
1987	19	49	—N/a	—N/a	—N/a
1988	20	45	—N/a	—N/a	—N/a
1989	21	NC	—N/a	—N/a	—N/a
1992	24	47	—N/a	—N/a	—N/a
1993	25	10	—N/a	—N/a	—N/a
1994	26	13	—N/a	—N/a	—N/a
1995	27	9	—N/a	—N/a	—N/a
1996	28	10	—N/a	—N/a	—N/a
1997	29	11	12	—N/a	11
1998	30	4	7	—N/a	4
1999	31	20	NC	—N/a	10
2000	32	9	10	10	2nd place, silver medalist(s)
2001	33	17	—N/a	—N/a	4
2002	34	9	—N/a	—N/a	2nd place, silver medalist(s)
2003	35	10	—N/a	—N/a	5

==== Individual podiums ====
- 3 victories
- 20 podiums

No.	Season	Date	Location	Race	Level	Place
1	1994–95	11 February 1995	Oslo, Norway	30 km Individual C	World Cup	2nd
2	1995–96	4 February 1996	Reit im Winkl, Germany	1.0 km Sprint F	World Cup	2nd
3	1996–97	4 February 1996	Oberstdorf, Germany	10 km Individual C	World Cup	3rd
4	1997–98	10 December 1997	Milan, Italy	1.0 km Sprint F	World Cup	3rd
5	1997–98	13 December 1997	Val di Fiemme, Italy	5 km Individual C	World Cup	2nd
6	1997–98	20 December 1997	Davos, Switzerland	15 km Individual C	World Cup	3rd
7	1997–98	14 March 1998	Oslo, Norway	30 km Individual C	World Cup	3rd
8	1998–99	10 December 1998	Milan, Italy	0.6 km Sprint F	World Cup	1st
9	1999–00	27 November 1999	Kiruna, Sweden	5 km Individual C	World Cup	2nd
10	1999–00	27 December 1999	Engelberg, Switzerland	1.0 km Sprint C	World Cup	2nd
11	1999–00	29 December 1999	Kitzbühel, Austria	1.5 km Sprint F	World Cup	3rd
12	1999–00	5 March 2000	Lahti, Finland	15 km Mass Start C	World Cup	3rd
13	1999–00	8 March 2000	Oslo, Norway	1.5 km Sprint C	World Cup	3rd
14	2000–01	1 February 2001	Asiago, Italy	1.5 km Sprint F	World Cup	2nd
15	2000–01	14 February 2001	Nové Město, Czech Republic	1.0 km Sprint F	World Cup	2nd
16	2001–02	29 December 2001	Salzburg, Austria	1.5 km Sprint C	World Cup	1st
17	2001–02	5 March 2002	Stockholm, Sweden	1.5 km Sprint C	World Cup	3rd
18	2001–02	23 March 2002	Birkebeinerrennet, Norway	58 km Mass Start C	World Cup	1st
19	2002–03	26 October 2002	Düsseldorf, Germany	1.3 km Sprint F	World Cup	3rd
20	2002–03	14 December 2002	Cogne, Italy	15 km Mass Start C	World Cup	3rd

==== Team podiums ====
- 5 victories – (3 RL, 2 TS)
- 29 podiums – (25 RL, 4 TS)

No.	Season	Date	Location	Race	Level	Place	Teammate(s)
1	1992–93	26 February 1993	Falun, Sweden	4 × 5 km Relay C/F	World Championships^{[1]}	3rd	Dybendahl-Hartz / Nybråten / Nilsen
2	1993–94	22 February 1994	Lillehammer, Norway	4 × 5 km Relay C/F	Olympic Games^{[1]}	2nd	Dybendahl-Hartz / Nybråten / Nilsen
3	1993–94	4 March 1994	Lahti, Finland	4 × 5 km Relay C	World Cup	1st	Nybråten / Wold / Dybendahl-Hartz
4	1993–94	13 March 1994	Falun, Sweden	4 × 5 km Relay F	World Cup	2nd	Nybråten / Wold / Dybendahl-Hartz
5	1994–95	29 January 1995	Lahti, Finland	4 × 5 km Relay F	World Cup	3rd	Nilsen / Dybendahl-Hartz / Martinsen
6	1994–95	7 February 1995	Hamar, Norway	4 × 3 km Relay F	World Cup	2nd	Nilsen / Martinsen / Dybendahl-Hartz
7	1994–95	12 February 1995	Oslo, Norway	4 × 5 km Relay C/F	World Cup	2nd	Mikkelsplass / Nybråten / Nilsen
8	1994–95	17 March 1995	Thunder Bay, Canada	4 × 5 km Relay C/F	World Championships^{[1]}	2nd	Mikkelsplass / Nybråten / Nilsen
9	1995–96	14 January 1996	Nové Město, Czech Republic	4 × 5 km Relay C	World Cup	2nd	Martinsen / Mikkelsplass / Dybendahl-Hartz
10	1995–96	3 February 1996	Seefeld, Austria	6 × 1.5 km Team Sprint F	World Cup	2nd	Dybendahl-Hartz
11	1995–96	10 March 1996	Falun, Sweden	4 × 5 km Relay C/F	World Cup	2nd	Martinsen / Mikkelsplass / Dybendahl-Hartz
12	1995–96	17 March 1996	Oslo, Norway	4 × 5 km Relay C/F	World Cup	3rd	Martinsen / Mikkelsplass / Sorkmo
13	1996–97	23 November 1996	Kiruna, Sweden	4 × 5 km Relay C	World Cup	2nd	Dybendahl-Hartz / Mikkelsplass / Martinsen
14	1996–97	8 December 1996	Davos, Switzerland	4 × 5 km Relay C	World Cup	1st	Martinsen / Mikkelsplass / Dybendahl-Hartz
15	1996–97	19 January 1997	Lahti, Finland	8 × 1.5 km Team Sprint F	World Cup	3rd	Dybendahl-Hartz
16	1996–97	16 March 1997	Oslo, Norway	4 × 5 km Relay F	World Cup	2nd	Nilsen / Mikkelsplass / Dybendahl-Hartz
17	1997–98	23 November 1997	Beitostølen, Norway	4 × 5 km Relay C	World Cup	2nd	Mikkelsplass / Dybendahl-Hartz / Martinsen
18	1998–99	29 November 1998	Muonio, Finland	4 × 5 km Relay F	World Cup	3rd	Martinsen / Nilsen / Sorkmo
19	1998–99	10 January 1999	Nové Město, Czech Republic	4 × 5 km Relay C/F	World Cup	2nd	Sorkmo / Nilsen / Martinsen
20	1998–99	21 March 1999	Oslo, Norway	4 × 5 km Relay C	World Cup	3rd	Martinsen / Glomsås / Nilsen
21	1999–00	28 November 1999	Kiruna, Sweden	4 × 5 km Relay F	World Cup	3rd	Martinseni / Nilsen / Pedersen
22	1999–00	8 December 1999	Asiago, Italy	Team Sprint F	World Cup	1st	Martinsen
23	1999–00	19 December 1999	Davos, Switzerland	4 × 5 km Relay C	World Cup	2nd	Glomsås / Nilsen / Martinsen
24	1999–00	13 January 2000	Nové Město, Czech Republic	4 × 5 km Relay C/F	World Cup	3rd	Martinsen / Nilsen / Sorkmo
25	2001–02	10 March 2002	Falun, Sweden	4 × 5 km Relay C/F	World Cup	2nd	Bjørgen / Pedersen / Skofterud
26	2002–03	24 November 2002	Kiruna, Sweden	4 × 5 km Relay C/F	World Cup	1st	Skari / Sorkmo / Skofterud
27	2002–03	19 January 2003	Nové Město, Czech Republic	4 × 5 km Relay C/F	World Cup	2nd	Bjørgen / Steira / Pedersen
28	2002–03	26 January 2003	Oberhof, Germany	6 × 1.5 km Team Sprint F	World Cup	1st	Pedersen
29	2002–03	23 March 2003	Falun, Sweden	4 × 5 km Relay C/F	World Cup	2nd	Pedersen / Steira / Skari

Note: ^{1} Until the 1999 World Championships and the 1994 Olympics, World Championship and Olympic races were included in the World Cup scoring system.
