= Bente Skari =

Norwegian cross-country skier (born 1972)

Personal information
- Nationality: Norway
- Born: Bente Martinsen; 10 September 1972 (age 54) Nittedal, Akershus, Norway
- Height: 173 cm (5 ft 8 in)

Sport
- Sport: Skiing
- Club: Nittedal IL

World Cup career
- Seasons: 11 – (1992, 1994–2003)
- Indiv. starts: 147
- Indiv. podiums: 60
- Indiv. wins: 42
- Team starts: 27
- Team podiums: 23
- Team wins: 5
- Overall titles: 4 – (1999, 2000, 2002, 2003)
- Discipline titles: 5 – (5 SP: 1998–2002)
Medal record
Women's cross-country skiing
Representing Norway
International nordic ski competitions
Event	1st	2nd	3rd
Olympic Games	1	2	2
World Championships	5	2	0
Total	6	4	2
Olympic Games
Gold medal – first place	2002 Salt Lake City	10 km classical
Silver medal – second place	1998 Nagano	4 × 5 km relay
Silver medal – second place	2002 Salt Lake City	4 × 5 km relay
Bronze medal – third place	1998 Nagano	5 km classical
Bronze medal – third place	2002 Salt Lake City	30 km classical
World Championships
Gold medal – first place	1999 Ramsau	5 km classical
Gold medal – first place	2001 Lahti	10 km classical
Gold medal – first place	2001 Lahti	15 km classical
Gold medal – first place	2003 Val di Fiemme	10 km classical
Gold medal – first place	2003 Val di Fiemme	15 km classical
Silver medal – second place	1997 Trondheim	4 × 5 km relay
Silver medal – second place	2001 Lahti	4 × 5 km relay
Junior World Championships
Gold medal – first place	1991 Reit im Winkl	4 × 5 km relay
Silver medal – second place	1992 Vuokatti	5 km classical

Bente Skari (née Martinsen; born 10 September 1972) is a Norwegian former cross-country skier. She is one of the most successful cross-country skiers ever.

== Career ==
She won her first Olympic medals in 1998, and won her first gold medal in the 2002 Winter Olympics, coming from behind to beat the favourites Olga Danilova and Julija Tchepalova in the last kilometers of the 10 km classical event. Skari was the first Norwegian woman to win an individual Olympic gold medal in cross-country skiing. She also won a bronze medal in 30 km classical as well as a silver medal in the relay.

Additionally, she won five gold medals (5 km: 1999, 10 km: 2001, 2003, and 15 km: 2001, 2003) from the FIS Nordic World Ski Championships, as well as two silver (4 × 5 km relay: 1997, 2001) medals. She won the overall cross-country skiing World Cup four times before retiring after the 2003 season.

Skari also won the women's 30 km event at the Holmenkollen ski festival in 2003. In 2001, she received the Holmenkollen medal (shared with Adam Małysz and Thomas Alsgaard). Her father, Odd Martinsen, earned the Holmenkollen medal in 1969. They are the only father-daughter combination to ever win this prestigious honour.

In 1998, she won Tjejvasan.

== After retirement ==
In 2007, Skari was named as the first female race administrator in cross-country skiing. She assisted in the 2007-08 Tour de Ski, working as an assistant technical delegate in the events held in the Czech Republic. This is part of the Norwegian Ski Federation's effort to promote more women in management positions in skiing.

== Cross-country skiing results ==
All results are sourced from the International Ski Federation (FIS).

=== Olympic Games ===
- 5 medals – (1 gold, 2 silver, 2 bronze)

Year	Age	5 km	10 km	15 km	Pursuit	30 km	Sprint	4 × 5 km relay
1994	21	—	—N/a	20	—	—	—N/a	—
1998	25	Bronze	—N/a	6	9	—	—N/a	Silver
2002	29	—N/a	Gold	—	6	Bronze	—	Silver

=== World Championships ===
- 7 medals – (5 gold, 2 silver)

Year	Age	5 km	10 km	15 km	Pursuit	30 km	Sprint	4 × 5 km relay
1995	22	—	—N/a	13	—	—	—N/a	—
1997	24	8	—N/a	—	17	8	—N/a	Silver
1999	26	Gold	—N/a	—	8	DNF	—N/a	4
2001	28	—N/a	Gold	Gold	5	CNX^{[a]}	15	Silver
2003	30	—N/a	Gold	Gold	DNS	—	—	—

a. ^{1} Cancelled due to extremely cold weather.

=== World Cup ===
==== Season titles ====
- 9 titles – (4 overall, 5 sprint)

Season
Season	Discipline
1998	Sprint
1999	Overall
1999	Sprint
2000	Overall
2000	Sprint
2001	Sprint
2002	Overall
2002	Sprint
2003	Overall

==== Season standings ====
Season	Age	Overall	Long Distance		Sprint
1992	20	NC	—N/a		—N/a
1994	22	32	—N/a		—N/a
1995	23	25	—N/a		—N/a
1996	24	12	—N/a		—N/a
1997	25	6	10		4
1998	26	2nd place, silver medalist(s)	10		1st place, gold medalist(s)
1999	27	1st place, gold medalist(s)	13		1st place, gold medalist(s)
2000	28	1st place, gold medalist(s)	5^{[a]}	6^{[a]}	1st place, gold medalist(s)
2001	29	2nd place, silver medalist(s)	—N/a		1st place, gold medalist(s)
2002	30	1st place, gold medalist(s)	—N/a		1st place, gold medalist(s)
2003	31	1st place, gold medalist(s)	—N/a		2nd place, silver medalist(s)

a. ^{1} 5th in the Long Distance World Cup.
^{2} 6th in the Middle Distance World Cup.

==== Individual podiums ====
- 42 victories
- 60 podiums

No.	Season	Date	Location	Race	Level	Place
1	1996–97	18 December 1996	Oberstdorf, Germany	10 km Individual C	World Cup	2nd
2	1996–97	3 November 1997	Sunne, Sweden	1.0 km Sprint F	World Cup	3rd
3	1997–98	22 November 1997	Beitostølen, Norway	5 km Individual C	World Cup	2nd
4	1997–98	10 December 1997	Milan, Italy	1.5 km Sprint F	World Cup	1st
5	1997–98	13 December 1997	Val di Fiemme, Italy	5 km Individual C	World Cup	1st
6	1997–98	8 January 1998	Ramsau, Austria	10 km Individual C	World Cup	2nd
7	1997–98	9 January 1998	Ramsau, Austria	5 km Individual C	World Cup	1st
8	1998–99	10 December 1998	Milan, Italy	0.6 km Sprint F	World Cup	3rd
9	1998–99	13 December 1998	Toblach, Italy	10 km Pursuit C	World Cup	1st
10	1998–99	19 December 1998	Davos, Switzerland	15 km Individual C	World Cup	2nd
11	1998–99	27 December 1998	Garmisch-Partenkirchen, Germany	1.5 km Sprint F	World Cup	1st
12	1998–99	28 December 1998	Engelberg, Switzerland	1.5 km Sprint F	World Cup	1st
13	1998–99	29 December 1998	Kitzbühel, Austria	1.5 km Sprint F	World Cup	1st
14	1998–99	5 January 1999	Otepää, Estonia	10 km Individual C	World Cup	1st
15	1998–99	9 January 1999	Nové Město, Czech Republic	10 km Individual C	World Cup	1st
16	1998–99	22 February 1999	Ramsau, Austria	5 km Individual C	World Championships^{[1]}	1st
17	1998–99	7 March 1999	Lahti, Finland	10 km Individual C	World Cup	2nd
18	1999–00	27 November 1999	Kiruna, Sweden	5 km Individual C	World Cup	1st
19	1999–00	18 December 1999	Davos, Switzerland	15 km Individual C	World Cup	3rd
20	1999–00	28 December 1999	Garmisch-Partenkirchen, Germany	1.5 km Sprint F	World Cup	2nd
21	1999–00	29 December 1999	Kitzbühel, Austria	1.5 km Sprint F	World Cup	1st
22	1999–00	12 January 2000	Nové Město, Czech Republic	10 km Individual C	World Cup	3rd
23	1999–00	28 February 2000	Stockholm, Sweden	1.5 km Sprint C	World Cup	1st
24	1999–00	3 March 2000	Lahti, Finland	1.5 km Sprint F	World Cup	2nd
25	1999–00	5 March 2000	Lahti, Finland	15 km Mass Start C	World Cup	2nd
26	1999–00	8 March 2000	Oslo, Norway	1.5 km Sprint C	World Cup	1st
27	1999–00	17 March 2000	Bormio, Italy	5 km Individual C	World Cup	1st
28	2000–01	25 November 2000	Beitostølen, Norway	10 km Individual C	World Cup	1st
29	2000–01	16 December 2000	Brusson, Italy	10 km Individual C	World Cup	1st
30	2000–01	20 December 2000	Davos, Switzerland	15 km Individual C	World Cup	2nd
31	2000–01	28 December 2000	Engelberg, Switzerland	1.5 km Sprint F	World Cup	1st
32	2000–01	14 January 2001	Soldier Hollow, United States	1.0 km Sprint F	World Cup	1st
33	2000–01	1 February 2001	Asiago, Italy	1.5 km Sprint F	World Cup	1st
34	2000–01	10 February 2001	Otepää, Estonia	5 km Individual C	World Cup	1st
35	2000–01	7 March 2001	Oslo, Norway	1.0 km Sprint C	World Cup	2nd
36	2000–01	10 March 2001	Oslo, Norway	30 km Individual C	World Cup	2nd
37	2000–01	18 March 2001	Falun, Sweden	10 km Individual C	World Cup	2nd
38	2001–02	24 November 2001	Kuopio, Finland	10 km Individual C	World Cup	1st
39	2001–02	8 December 2001	Cogne, Italy	5 km Individual C	World Cup	1st
40	2001–02	15 December 2001	Davos, Switzerland	10 km Individual C	World Cup	1st
41	2001–02	19 December 2001	Asiago, Italy	1.5 km Sprint C	World Cup	1st
42	2001–02	5 January 2002	Val di Fiemme, Italy	5 km + 5 km Pursuit C/F	World Cup	2nd
43	2001–02	8 January 2002	Val di Fiemme, Italy	15 km Mass Start C	World Cup	1st
44	2001–02	5 March 2002	Stockholm, Sweden	1.5 km Sprint C	World Cup	1st
45	2001–02	13 March 2002	Oslo, Norway	1.5 km Sprint C	World Cup	1st
46	2002–03	30 November 2002	Rukatunturi, Finland	10 km Individual C	World Cup	1st
47	2002–03	7 December 2002	Davos, Switzerland	10 km Individual F	World Cup	1st
48	2002–03	14 December 2002	Cogne, Italy	15 km Mass Start C	World Cup	1st
49	2002–03	15 December 2002	Cogne, Italy	1.5 km Sprint C	World Cup	1st
50	2002–03	21 December 2002	Ramsau, Austria	5 km + 5 km Pursuit C/F	World Cup	1st
51	2002–03	12 January 2003	Otepää, Estonia	15 km Mass Start C	World Cup	1st
52	2002–03	18 January 2003	Nové Město, Czech Republic	10 km Individual F	World Cup	1st
53	2002–03	25 January 2003	Oberhof, Germany	10 km Mass Start C	World Cup	1st
54	2002–03	15 February 2003	(Italy) Asiago, Germany	5 km Individual C	World Cup	1st
55	2002–03	6 March 2003	Oslo, Norway	1.5 km Sprint C	World Cup	1st
56	2002–03	8 March 2003	Oslo, Norway	30 km Individual C	World Cup	1st
57	2002–03	11 March 2003	Drammen, Norway	1.5 km Sprint C	World Cup	1st
58	2002–03	16 March 2003	Lahti, Finland	10 km Individual F	World Cup	3rd
59	2002–03	20 March 2003	Borlänge, Sweden	1.5 km Sprint F	World Cup	1st
60	2002–03	22 March 2003	Falun, Sweden	5 km + 5 km Pursuit C/F	World Cup	1st

==== Team podiums ====
- 5 victories – (4 RL, 1 TS)
- 23 podiums – (22 RL, 1 TS)

No.	Season	Date	Location	Race	Level	Place	Teammate(s)
1	1994–95	29 January 1995	Lahti, Finland	4 × 5 km Relay F	World Cup	3rd	Moen / Nilsen / Dybendahl-Hartz
2	1994–95	7 February 1995	Hamar, Norway	4 × 3 km Relay F	World Cup	2nd	Moen / Nilsen / Dybendahl-Hartz
3	1995–96	14 January 1996	Nové Město, Czech Republic	4 × 5 km Relay C	World Cup	2nd	Moen / Mikkelsplass / Dybendahl-Hartz
4	1995–96	10 March 1996	Falun, Sweden	4 × 5 km Relay C/F	World Cup	2nd	Mikkelsplass / Dybendahl-Hartz / Moen
5	1995–96	17 March 1996	Oslo, Norway	4 × 5 km Relay C/F	World Cup	3rd	Mikkelsplass / Sorkmo / Moen
6	1996–97	24 November 1996	Kiruna, Sweden	4 × 5 km Relay C	World Cup	2nd	Dybendahl-Hartz / Mikkelsplass / Moen
7	1996–97	8 December 1996	Davos, Switzerland	4 × 5 km Relay C	World Cup	1st	Moen / Mikkelsplass / Dybendahl-Hartz
8	1996–97	28 February 1997	Trondheim, Norway	4 × 5 km Relay C/F	World Championships^{[1]}	2nd	Mikkelsplass / Nilsen / Dybendahl-Hartz
9	1996–97	9 March 1997	Falun, Sweden	4 × 5 km Relay C/F	World Cup	2nd	Dybendahl-Hartz / Nilsen / Sorkmo
10	1997–98	23 November 1997	Beitostølen, Norway	4 × 5 km Relay C	World Cup	2nd	Moen / Mikkelsplass / Dybendahl-Hartz
11	1997–98	6 March 1998	Lahti, Finland	4 × 5 km Relay C/F	World Cup	2nd	Mikkelsplass / Nilsen / Dybendahl-Hartz
12	1998–99	28 November 1998	Muonio, Finland	4 × 5 km Relay F	World Cup	3rd	Nilsen / Moen / Sorkmo
13	1998–99	10 January 1999	Nové Město, Czech Republic	4 × 5 km Relay C/F	World Cup	2nd	Sorkmo / Moen / Nilsen
14	1998–99	21 March 1999	Oslo, Norway	4 × 5 km Relay C	World Cup	3rd	Glomsås / Nilsen / Moen
15	1999–00	28 November 1999	Kiruna, Sweden	4 × 5 km Relay F	World Cup	3rd	Nilsen / Pedersen / Moen
16	1999–00	8 December 1999	Asiago, Italy	Team Sprint F	World Cup	1st	Moen
17	1999–00	19 December 1999	Davos, Switzerland	4 × 5 km Relay C	World Cup	2nd	Moen / Glomsås / Nilsen
18	1999–00	13 January 2000	Nové Město, Czech Republic	4 × 5 km Relay C/F	World Cup	3rd	Moen / Nilsen / Sorkmo
19	2000–01	9 December 2000	Santa Caterina, Italy	4 × 3 km Relay C/F	World Cup	2nd	Bay / Nilsen / Pedersen
20	2001–02	16 December 2001	Davos, Switzerland	4 × 5 km Relay C/F	World Cup	1st	Bay / Pedersen / Skofterud
21	2002–03	24 November 2002	Kiruna, Sweden	4 × 5 km Relay C/F	World Cup	1st	Moen / Sorkmo / Skofterud
22	2002–03	8 December 2002	Davos, Switzerland	4 × 5 km Relay C/F	World Cup	1st	Skofterud / Pedersen / Sorkmo
23	2002–03	23 March 2003	Falun, Sweden	4 × 5 km Relay C/F	World Cup	2nd	Moen / Pedersen / Steira

Note: ^{1} Until the 1999 World Championships, World Championship races were included in the World Cup scoring system.

==== Overall record ====
Result	Distance Races^{[a]}						Sprint	Ski Tours	Individual Events	Team Events			All Events
Result	≤ 5 km^{[b]}	≤ 10 km^{[b]}	≤ 15 km^{[b]}	≤ 30 km^{[b]}	≥ 30 km^{[b]}	Pursuit^{[c]}	Sprint	Ski Tours	Individual Events	Team Sprint	Relay^{[d]}	Mixed Relay	All Events
1st place	8	11	3	1	–	2	17	–	42	1	4	–	47
2nd place	1	4	3	1	–	1	3	–	13	–	12	–	25
3rd place	–	2	1	–	–	–	2	–	5	–	6	–	11
Podiums	9	17	7	2	–	3	22	–	60	1	22	–	83
Top 10	16	24	13	5	–	7	25	–	90	1	26	1	118
Points	29	41	21	11	1	9	28	–	140	1	26	1	168
Others	1	–	1	–	–	–	–	–	2	–	–	–	2
DNF	–	–	–	–	1	–	–	–	1	–	–	–	1
Starts	30	41	22	11	2	9	28	–	143	1	26	1	171

a. ^{1} Classification is made according to FIS classification.
b. ^{1} ^{2} ^{3} ^{4} ^{5} Includes individual and mass start races.
c. ^{1} Includes pursuit and double pursuit races.
d. ^{1} May be incomplete due to lack of appropriate sources for some relay races prior to 1995/96 World Cup season.

Note: Until 1999 World Championships and 1994 Olympics, World Championship and Olympic races are part of the World Cup. Hence results from those races are included in the World Cup overall record.

== Personal life ==
Bente Skari was named Martinsen before marrying Geir Skari in 1999. She is the mother of three children, Filip, Oda and Selma.
