= Elin Nilsen =

Norwegian cross-country skier (born 1968)

Personal information
- Nationality: Norway
- Born: 12 August 1968 (age 57) Mo i Rana, Norway

Sport
- Sport: Skiing
- Club: Bossmo & Ytteren IL

World Cup career
- Seasons: 13 – (1989–1995, 1997–2002)
- Indiv. starts: 113
- Indiv. podiums: 3
- Indiv. wins: 0
- Team starts: 34
- Team podiums: 24
- Team wins: 2
- Overall titles: 0 – (5th in 1992)
- Discipline titles: 0
Medal record
Women's cross-country skiing
Representing Norway
Olympic Games
Silver medal – second place	1992 Albertville	4 × 5 km relay
Silver medal – second place	1994 Lillehammer	4 × 5 km relay
Silver medal – second place	1998 Nagano	4 × 5 km relay
World Championships
Silver medal – second place	1995 Thunder Bay	4 × 5 km relay
Silver medal – second place	1997 Trondheim	4 × 5 km relay
Silver medal – second place	2001 Lahti	4 × 5 km relay
Bronze medal – third place	1991 Val di Fiemme	4 × 5 km relay
Bronze medal – third place	1993 Falun	4 × 5 km relay

Elin Nilsen (born 12 August 1968) is a Norwegian former cross-country skier who competed from 1990 to 2004. She won three silver medals in the 4 × 5 km relay at the Winter Olympics (1992, 1994, 1998). Her best individual Olympic finish was fourth in the 30 km event in both in 1992 and 1998.

Nilsen also won five 4 × 5 km relay medals at the Nordic skiing World Championships with three silvers (1995, 1997, 2001) and two bronzes (1991, 1993). Her best individual finish at the World Championships was fourth in the 15 km event in 1999.

Nilsen won four races in career at all levels from 1994 to 2002

She represented Bossmo & Ytteren IL.

== Cross-country skiing results ==
All results are sourced from the International Ski Federation (FIS).

=== Olympic Games ===
- 3 medals – (3 silver)

Year	Age	5 km	15 km	Pursuit	30 km	4 × 5 km relay
1992	23	10	—	5	4	Silver
1994	25	12	13	12	—	Silver
1998	29	—	—	—	4	Silver

=== World Championships ===
- 5 medals – (3 silver, 2 bronze)

Year	Age	5 km	10 km	15 km	Pursuit	30 km	Sprint	4 × 5 km relay
1991	22	—	15	—	—N/a	19	—N/a	Bronze
1993	24	16	—N/a	—	13	13	—N/a	Bronze
1995	26	—	—N/a	—	—	7	—N/a	Silver
1997	28	—	—N/a	7	—	—	—N/a	Silver
1999	30	16	—N/a	4	DNF	—	—N/a	4
2001	32	—N/a	—	—	—	CNX^{[a]}	—	Silver

a. ^{1} Cancelled due to extremely cold weather.

=== World Cup ===
==== Season standings ====
Season	Age					
Season	Age	Overall	Distance	Long Distance	Middle Distance	Sprint
1989	20	NC	—N/a	—N/a	—N/a	—N/a
1990	21	23	—N/a	—N/a	—N/a	—N/a
1991	22	19	—N/a	—N/a	—N/a	—N/a
1992	23	5	—N/a	—N/a	—N/a	—N/a
1993	24	18	—N/a	—N/a	—N/a	—N/a
1994	25	17	—N/a	—N/a	—N/a	—N/a
1995	26	11	—N/a	—N/a	—N/a	—N/a
1997	28	14	—N/a	7	—N/a	27
1998	29	13	—N/a	12	—N/a	16
1999	30	14	—N/a	15	—N/a	19
2000	31	23	—N/a	14	19	46
2001	32	37	—N/a	—N/a	—N/a	—
2002	33	39	—N/a	—N/a	—N/a	—

==== Individual podiums ====
- 3 podiums

No.	Season	Date	Location	Race	Level	Place
1	1991–92	14 December 1991	Thunder Bay, Canada	5 km Individual F	World Cup	3rd
2	1991–92	11 January 1992	Cogne, Italy	30 km Individual F	World Cup	2nd
3	1996–97	15 March 1997	Oslo, Norway	30 km Individual F	World Cup	3rd

==== Team podiums ====
- 2 victories
- 24 podiums

No.	Season	Date	Location	Race	Level	Place	Teammates
1	1989–90	11 March 1990	Örnsköldsvik, Sweden	4 × 5 km Relay C/F	World Cup	2nd	Pedersen / Nybråten / Hegge
2	1990–91	15 February 1991	Val di Fiemme, Italy	4 × 5 km Relay C/F	World Championships^{[1]}	3rd	Pedersen / Nybråten / Dybendahl-Hartz
3	1990–91	10 March 1991	Falun, Sweden	4 × 5 km Relay C	World Cup	2nd	Pedersen / Nybråten / Dybendahl-Hartz
4	1990–91	15 March 1991	Oslo, Norway	4 × 5 km Relay C/F	World Cup	1st	Dybendahl-Hartz / Nybråten / Pedersen
5	1991–92	18 February 1992	Albertville, France	4 × 5 km Relay C/F	Olympic Games^{[1]}	2nd	Pedersen / Nybråten / Dybendahl-Hartz
6	1991–92	8 March 1992	Funäsdalen, Sweden	4 × 5 km Relay C	World Cup	1st	Pedersen / Nybråten / Dybendahl-Hartz
7	1992–93	26 February 1993	Falun, Sweden	4 × 5 km Relay C/F	World Championships^{[1]}	3rd	Dybendahl-Hartz / Nybråten / Moen
8	1993–94	22 February 1994	Lillehammer, Norway	4 × 5 km Relay C/F	Olympic Games^{[1]}	2nd	Dybendahl-Hartz / Nybråten / Moen
9	1994–95	29 January 1995	Lahti, Finland	4 × 5 km Relay F	World Cup	3rd	Moen / Dybendahl-Hartz / Martinsen
10	1994–95	7 February 1995	Hamar, Norway	4 × 3 km Relay F	World Cup	2nd	Moen / Martinsen / Dybendahl-Hartz
11	1994–95	12 February 1995	Oslo, Norway	4 × 5 km Relay C/F	World Cup	2nd	Mikkelsplass / Nybråten / Moen
12	1994–95	17 March 1995	Thunder Bay, Canada	4 × 5 km Relay C/F	World Championships^{[1]}	2nd	Mikkelsplass / Nybråten / Moen
13	1994–95	26 March 1995	Sapporo, Japan	4 × 5 km Relay C/F	World Cup	2nd	Dybendahl-Hartz / Nybråten / Mikkelsplass
14	1996–97	28 February 1997	Trondheim, Norway	4 × 5 km Relay C/F	World Championships^{[1]}	2nd	Martinsen / Mikkelsplass / Dybendahl-Hartz
15	1996–97	9 March 1997	Falun, Sweden	4 × 5 km Relay C/F	World Cup	2nd	Martinsen / Dybendahl-Hartz / Sorkmo
16	1996–97	16 March 1997	Oslo, Norway	4 × 5 km Relay F	World Cup	2nd	Moen / Mikkelsplass / Dybendahl-Hartz
17	1997–98	6 March 1998	Lahti, Finland	4 × 5 km Relay C/F	World Cup	2nd	Martinsen / Mikkelsplass / Dybendahl-Hartz
18	1998–99	29 November 1998	Muonio, Finland	4 × 5 km Relay F	World Cup	3rd	Martinsen / Moen / Sorkmo
19	1998–99	10 January 1999	Nové Město, Czech Republic	4 × 5 km Relay C/F	World Cup	2nd	Sorkmo / Moen / Martinsen
20	1998–99	21 March 1999	Oslo, Norway	4 × 5 km Relay C/F	World Cup	2nd	Martinsen / Glomsås / Moen
21	1999–00	28 November 1999	Kiruna, Sweden	4 × 5 km Relay F	World Cup	3rd	Martinsen / Pedersen / Moen
22	1999–00	19 December 1999	Davos, Switzerland	4 × 5 km Relay C	World Cup	2nd	Moen / Glomsås / Martinsen
23	1999–00	13 January 2000	Nové Město, Czech Republic	4 × 5 km Relay C/F	World Cup	3rd	Moen / Martinsen / Sorkmo
24	2000–01	9 December 2000	Santa Caterina, Italy	4 × 3 km Relay C/F	World Cup	2nd	Bay / Skari / Pedersen

Note: ^{1} Until the 1999 World Championships and the 1994 Olympics, World Championship and Olympic races were included in the World Cup scoring system.
