= Trude Dybendahl =

Norwegian cross-country skier (1966–2024)

Personal information
- Born: 8 January 1966 Oslo, Norway
- Died: 23 August 2024 (aged 58)

Sport
- Sport: Skiing
- Club: Kjelsås IL

World Cup career
- Seasons: 13 – (1986–1998)
- Indiv. starts: 104
- Indiv. podiums: 18
- Indiv. wins: 7
- Team starts: 33
- Team podiums: 30
- Team wins: 9
- Overall titles: 0 – (3rd in 1990)
- Discipline titles: 0
Medal record
Women's cross-country skiing
Representing Norway
Olympic Games
Silver medal – second place	1988 Calgary	4 × 5 km relay
Silver medal – second place	1992 Albertville	4 × 5 km relay
Silver medal – second place	1994 Lillehammer	4 × 5 km relay
World Championships
Gold medal – first place	1991 Val di Fiemme	5 km classical
Silver medal – second place	1991 Val di Fiemme	15 km classical
Silver medal – second place	1997 Trondheim	4 × 5 km relay
Bronze medal – third place	1991 Val di Fiemme	4 × 5 km relay
Bronze medal – third place	1993 Falun	5 km classical
Bronze medal – third place	1993 Falun	4 × 5 km relay
Junior World Championships
Gold medal – first place	1986 Lake Placid	3 × 5 km relay

Trude Dybendahl (8 January 1966 – 23 August 2024), sometimes listed as Trude Dybendahl-Hartz or Trude Dybendahl Hartz, was a Norwegian cross-country skier who competed at international top level from 1986 to 1998. She won three silver medals in the 4 × 5 km relay at the Winter Olympics (1988, 1992, 1994). Her best individual Olympic finish was fourth in the 30 km event in 1994.

Dybendahl also won six medals at the FIS Nordic World Ski Championships with one gold (5 km: 1991), two silvers (15 km: 1991, 4 × 5 km relay: 1997), and three bronzes (4 × 5 km relay: 1991, 1993; 5 km: 1993). She also won the 20 km double pursuit event at the 1990 Holmenkollen ski festival.

During her career, Dybendahl represented Kjelsås IL in Oslo. She died on 23 August 2024, at the age of 58.

== Cross-country skiing results ==
All results are sourced from the International Ski Federation (FIS).

=== Olympic Games ===
- 3 medals – (3 silver)

Year	Age	5 km	10 km	15 km	Pursuit	20 km	30 km	4 × 5 km relay
1988	22	—	—	—N/a	—N/a	—	—N/a	Silver
1992	26	21	—N/a	8	DNS	—N/a	9	Silver
1994	28	7	—N/a	—	7	—N/a	4	Silver
1998	32	8	—N/a	6	11	—N/a	DNF	—

=== World Championships ===
- 6 medals – (1 gold, 2 silver, 3 bronze)

Year	Age	5 km	10 km classical	10 km freestyle	15 km	Pursuit	30 km	4 × 5 km relay
1989	23	—N/a	12	—	12	—N/a	—	—
1991	25	Gold	—N/a	—	Silver	—N/a	—	Bronze
1993	27	Bronze	—N/a	—N/a	10	11	—	Bronze
1995	29	37	—N/a	—N/a	9	16	10	—
1997	31	9	—N/a	—N/a	—	18	7	Silver

=== World Cup ===
==== Season standings ====
Season	Age			
Season	Age	Overall	Long Distance	Sprint
1986	20	27	—N/a	—N/a
1987	21	32	—N/a	—N/a
1988	22	12	—N/a	—N/a
1989	23	15	—N/a	—N/a
1990	24	3rd place, bronze medalist(s)	—N/a	—N/a
1991	25	6	—N/a	—N/a
1992	26	7	—N/a	—N/a
1993	27	6	—N/a	—N/a
1994	28	9	—N/a	—N/a
1995	29	10	—N/a	—N/a
1996	30	14	—N/a	—N/a
1997	31	9	19	5
1998	32	8	13	6

==== Individual podiums ====
- 7 victories
- 18 podiums

No.	Season	Date	Location	Race	Level	Place
1	1988–89	7 January 1989	Kavgolovo, Soviet Union	15 km Individual C	World Cup	3rd
2	1989–90	15 December 1989	Thunder Bay, Canada	15 km Individual C	World Cup	2nd
3	1989–90	14 January 1990	Moscow, Soviet Union	7.5 km Individual C	World Cup	1st
4	1989–90	25 February 1990	(Socialist Federal Republic of Yugoslavia) Bohinj, Yugoslavia	10 km Individual C	World Cup	3rd
5	1989–90	10 March 1990	Örnsköldsvik, Sweden	10 km Individual C	World Cup	1st
6	1989–90	17 March 1990	Vang, Norway	10 km + 10 km Pursuit C/F	World Cup	1st
7	1990–91	8 February 1991	Val di Fiemme, Italy	15 km Individual C	World Championships^{[1]}	2nd
8	1990–91	12 February 1991	Val di Fiemme, Italy	5 km Individual C	World Championships^{[1]}	1st
9	1991–92	11 January 1992	Cogne, Italy	30 km Individual F	World Cup	3rd
10	1991–92	7 March 1992	Funäsdalen, Sweden	5 km Individual C	World Cup	2nd
11	1992–93	3 January 1993	Kavgolovo, Russia	30 km Individual C	World Cup	3rd
12	1992–93	21 February 1993	Falun, Sweden	5 km Individual C	World Championships^{[1]}	3rd
13	1992–93	9 March 1993	Lillehammer, Norway	5 km Individual C	World Cup	1st
14	1993–94	12 March 1994	Falun, Sweden	10 km Individual F	World Cup	3rd
15	1994–95	27 November 1994	Kiruna, Sweden	5 km Individual C	World Cup	3rd
16	1996–97	18 December 1996	Oberstdorf, Germany	10 km Individual C	World Cup	1st
17	1996–97	11 March 1997	Sunne, Sweden	1.0 km Sprint F	World Cup	1st
18	1997–98	10 December 1997	Milan, Italy	1.5 km Sprint F	World Cup	2nd

==== Team podiums ====
- 9 victories – (9 RL)
- 30 podiums – (28 RL, 2 TS)

No.	Season	Date	Location	Race	Level	Place	Teammate(s)
1	1984–85	10 March 1985	Falun, Sweden	4 × 5 km Relay	World Cup	1st	Nykkelmo / Dahlmo / Bøe
2	1985–86	1 March 1986	Lahti, Finland	4 × 5 km Relay C	World Cup	2nd	Myklebust / Skeime / Østvold
3	1986–87	19 March 1987	Oslo, Norway	4 × 5 km Relay C	World Cup	1st	Pettersen / Nybråten / Nykkelmo
4	1987–88	21 February 1988	Calgary, Canada	4 × 5 km Relay F	Olympic Games^{[1]}	2nd	Wold / Jahren / Dahlmo
5	1987–88	13 March 1988	Falun, Sweden	4 × 5 km Relay C	World Cup	1st	Nybråten / Jahren / Dahlmo
6	1988–89	12 March 1989	Falun, Sweden	4 × 5 km Relay C	World Cup	1st	Dahlmo / Jahren / Nybråten
7	1989–90	4 March 1990	Lahti, Finland	4 × 5 km Relay F	World Cup	1st	Pedersen / Nybråten / Jahren
8	1990–91	15 February 1991	Val di Fiemme, Italy	4 × 5 km Relay C/F	World Championships^{[1]}	3rd	Pedersen / Nybråten / Nilsen
9	1990–91	10 March 1991	Falun, Sweden	4 × 5 km Relay C	World Cup	2nd	Pedersen / Nybråten / Nilsen
10	1990–91	15 March 1991	Oslo, Norway	4 × 5 km Relay C/F	World Cup	1st	Nybråten / Pedersen / Nilsen
11	1991–92	18 February 1992	Albertville, France	4 × 5 km Relay C/F	Olympic Games^{[1]}	2nd	Pedersen / Nybråten / Nilsen
12	1991–92	8 March 1992	Funäsdalen, Sweden	4 × 5 km Relay C	World Cup	1st	Pedersen / Nybråten / Nilsen
13	1992–93	26 February 1993	Falun, Sweden	4 × 5 km Relay C/F	World Championships^{[1]}	3rd	Nybråten / Moen / Nilsen
14	1993–94	22 February 1994	Lillehammer, Norway	4 × 5 km Relay C/F	Olympic Games^{[1]}	2nd	Nybråten / Nilsen / Moen
15	1993–94	4 March 1994	Lahti, Finland	4 × 5 km Relay C	World Cup	1st	Moen / Nybråten / Wold
16	1993–94	13 March 1994	Falun, Sweden	4 × 5 km Relay F	World Cup	2nd	Moen / Nybråten / Wold
17	1994–95	29 January 1995	Lahti, Finland	4 × 5 km Relay F	World Cup	3rd	Moen / Nilsen / Martinsen
18	1994–95	7 February 1995	Hamar, Norway	4 × 3 km Relay F	World Cup	2nd	Moen / Nilsen / Martinsen
19	1994–95	26 March 1995	Sapporo, Japan	4 × 5 km Relay C/F	World Cup	2nd	Nybråten / Mikkelsplass / Nilsen
20	1995–96	14 January 1996	Nové Město, Czech Republic	4 × 5 km Relay C	World Cup	2nd	Moen / Martinsen / Mikkelsplass
21	1995–96	3 February 1996	Seefeld, Austria	6 × 1.5 km Team Sprint F	World Cup	2nd	Moen
22	1995–96	10 March 1996	Falun, Sweden	4 × 5 km Relay C/F	World Cup	2nd	Martinsen / Mikkelsplass / Moen
23	1996–97	23 November 1996	Kiruna, Sweden	4 × 5 km Relay C	World Cup	2nd	Mikkelsplass / Moen / Martinsen
24	1996–97	8 December 1996	Davos, Switzerland	4 × 5 km Relay C	World Cup	1st	Martinsen / Moen / Mikkelsplass
25	1996–97	19 January 1997	Lahti, Finland	8 × 1.5 km Team Sprint F	World Cup	3rd	Moen
26	1996–97	28 February 1997	Trondheim, Norway	4 × 5 km Relay C/F	World Championships^{[1]}	2nd	Martinsen / Mikkelsplass / Nilsen
27	1996–97	9 March 1997	Falun, Sweden	4 × 5 km Relay C/F	World Cup	2nd	Martinsen / Nilsen / Sorkmo
28	1996–97	16 March 1997	Oslo, Norway	4 × 5 km Relay F	World Cup	2nd	Moen / Nilsen / Mikkelsplass
29	1997–98	23 November 1997	Beitostølen, Norway	4 × 5 km Relay C	World Cup	2nd	Moen / Mikkelsplass / Martinsen
30	1997–98	6 March 1998	Lahti, Finland	4 × 5 km Relay C/F	World Cup	2nd	Martinsen / Mikkelsplass / Nilsen

Note: ^{1} Until the 1999 World Championships and the 1994 Olympics, World Championship and Olympic races were included in the World Cup scoring system.

== Sources ==
- (in Norwegian)
