= Solveig Pedersen =

Norwegian cross-country skier

Personal information
- Nationality: Norway
- Born: 6 September 1965 (age 60) Oslo, Norway

Sport
- Sport: Skiing
- Club: Oddersjaa SSK

World Cup career
- Seasons: 4 – (1986, 1988, 1990–1992)
- Indiv. starts: 26
- Indiv. podiums: 1
- Indiv. wins: 0
- Team starts: 9
- Team podiums: 9
- Team wins: 4
- Overall titles: 0 – (10th in 1991)
Medal record
Women's cross-country skiing
Representing Norway
Olympic Games
| Silver medal – second place | 1992 Albertville | 4 × 5 km relay |
World Championships
| Bronze medal – third place | 1991 Val di Fiemme | 4 × 5 km relay |
Junior World Championships
| Silver medal – second place | 1983 Kuopio | 3 × 5 km relay |

Solveig Pedersen (born 6 September 1965) is a Norwegian former cross-country skier who competed in the 1980s and 1990s. She won a 4 × 5 km relay silver medal at the 1992 Winter Olympics in Albertville and finished eighth in the 5 km event at those same games.

Pedersen also won a bronze in the 4 × 5 km relay at the 1991 FIS Nordic World Ski Championships and finished fourth in the 15 km event at those same games. Her best individual event was third in a 15 km event in Germany in 1991. On club level she represented Oddersjaa SSK in Kristiansand. Her coach was Arild Jørgensen.

== Cross-country skiing results ==
All results are sourced from the International Ski Federation (FIS).

=== Olympic Games ===
- 1 medal – (1 silver)

| Year | Age | 5 km | 15 km | Pursuit | 30 km | 4 × 5 km relay |
|---|---|---|---|---|---|---|
| 1992 | 26 | 8 | 20 | 15 | — | Silver |

=== World Championships ===
- 1 medal – (1 bronze)

| Year | Age | 5 km | 10 km | 15 km | 30 km | 4 × 5 km relay |
|---|---|---|---|---|---|---|
| 1991 | 25 | 8 | — | 4 | 20 | Bronze |

=== World Cup ===
==== Season standings ====
| Season | Age | Overall |
|---|---|---|
| 1986 | 20 | 23 |
| 1988 | 22 | 51 |
| 1990 | 24 | 12 |
| 1991 | 25 | 10 |
| 1992 | 26 | 19 |

==== Individual podiums ====
- 1 podium

| No. | Season | Date | Location | Race | Level | Place |
|---|---|---|---|---|---|---|
| 1 | 1990–91 | 12 January 1991 | Klingenthal, Germany | 15 km Individual C | World Cup | 3rd |

==== Team podiums ====
- 4 victories
- 9 podiums

| No. | Season | Date | Location | Race | Level | Place | Teammates |
|---|---|---|---|---|---|---|---|
| 1 | 1985–86 | 1 March 1986 | Lahti, Finland | 4 × 5 km Relay C | World Cup | 1st | Aunli / Pettersen / Jahren |
| 2 | 1987–88 | 13 March 1988 | Falun, Sweden | 4 × 5 km Relay C | World Cup | 3rd | Elveos / Wold / Bøe |
| 3 | 1989–90 | 4 March 1990 | Lahti, Finland | 4 × 5 km Relay F | World Cup | 1st | Nybråten / Jahren / Dybendahl-Hartz |
| 4 | 1989–90 | 11 March 1990 | Örnsköldsvik, Sweden | 4 × 5 km Relay C/F | World Cup | 2nd | Nybråten / Hegge / Nilsen |
| 5 | 1990–91 | 15 February 1991 | Val di Fiemme, Italy | 4 × 5 km Relay C/F | World Championships^{[1]} | 3rd | Nybråten / Nilsen / Dybendahl-Hartz |
| 6 | 1990–91 | 10 March 1991 | Falun, Sweden | 4 × 5 km Relay C | World Cup | 2nd | Nybråten / Nilsen / Dybendahl-Hartz |
| 7 | 1990–91 | 15 March 1991 | Oslo, Norway | 4 × 5 km Relay C/F | World Cup | 1st | Dybendahl-Hartz / Nybråten / Nilsen |
| 8 | 1991–92 | 18 February 1992 | Albertville, France | 4 × 5 km Relay C/F | Olympic Games^{[1]} | 2nd | Nybråten / Dybendahl-Hartz / Nilsen |
| 9 | 1991–92 | 8 March 1992 | Funäsdalen, Sweden | 4 × 5 km Relay C | World Cup | 1st | Nybråten / Nilsen / Dybendahl-Hartz |

Note: ^{1} Until the 1999 World Championships and the 1994 Olympics, World Championship and Olympic races were included in the World Cup scoring system.
