= Surnadal IL =

Norwegian sports club

Surnadal
- Full name: Surnadal Idrettslag
- Founded: 13 April 1913
- Ground: Syltøran Stadion; Surnadal Municipality
- Capacity: 500
- President: Øystein Hjelle Bondhus
- Head coach: Knut Ola Høvik
- League: 3. divisjon
- 2024: 3. divisjon group 4, 11th of 14
Home colours	Away colours

Surnadal Idrettslag is a Norwegian sports club from Surnadal Municipality. It has sections for association football, team handball, alpine skiing and Nordic skiing.

== General history ==
It was founded on 13 April 1913 as IL Framtid. The name Surnadal IL was taken in 1966, when IL Framtid was merged with IL Bjørn (founded 1932) and Surnadal JIL (founded 1945).

== Skiing ==
Members of the skiing department include Sturla Brørs and Sigurd Brørs.

== Football ==
The men's football team currently plays in the Fourth Division, the fifth tier of Norwegian football. Syltøran stadion is their home field. Their team colors are blue and white.

Recent history, men's football team

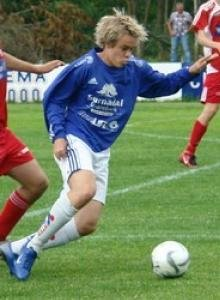
Helge Krangnes Drøpping.

Season	League								
Season	Division	Pos	Pl	W	D	L	GS	GA	Pts
1999	Div 3	2	22	15	2	5	64	37	47
2000	Div 3	3	22	12	7	3	58	34	43
2001	Div 3	7	22	11	1	10	49	48	34
2002	Div 3	6	22	10	2	10	47	40	32
2003	Div 3	2	22	15	2	5	79	35	47
2004	Div 3	4	22	12	5	5	65	38	41
2005	Div 3	4	22	12	1	9	68	46	37
2006	Div 3	-	-	-	-	-	-	-	-
2007	Div 3	9	22	6	2	14	44	60	20
2008	Div 3	6	22	7	6	9	35	47	27
2009	Div 3	7	22	6	6	10	38	48	24
2015	Div 4	1	22	19	0	3	91	24	57
