= Inger Lise Hegge =

Norwegian cross-country skier

Personal information
- Nationality: Norway
- Born: 6 January 1965 (age 61) Steinkjer, Norway

Sport
- Sport: Skiing
- Club: Henning IL

World Cup career
- Seasons: 8 – (1988–1995)
- Indiv. starts: 40
- Indiv. podiums: 0
- Team starts: 2
- Team podiums: 2
- Team wins: 0
- Overall titles: 0 – (16th in 1992)

Inger Lise Hegge (born 6 January 1965) is a Norwegian cross-country skier who competed from 1989 to 1995. Her best World Cup finish was fourth in a 30 km event in the Soviet Union in 1991.

At the 1992 Winter Olympics in Albertville, Hegge finished 14th in the 30 km and 21st in the 15 km events. Her best finish at the FIS Nordic World Ski Championships was 11th in the 30 km event at Falun in 1993.

She represented the club Henning SL.

== Cross-country skiing results ==
All results are sourced from the International Ski Federation (FIS).

=== Olympic Games ===
Year	Age	5 km	15 km	Pursuit	30 km	4 × 5 km relay
1992	27	—	21	—	14	—

=== World Championships ===
Year	Age	5 km	10 km classical	10 km freestyle	15 km	Pursuit	30 km	4 × 5 km relay
1989	24	—N/a	—	19	—	—N/a	13	—
1991	26	—	—N/a	12	—	—N/a	15	—
1993	28	—	—N/a	—N/a	—	—	11	—

=== World Cup ===
==== Season standings ====
Season	Age	Overall
1988	23	NC
1989	24	37
1990	25	18
1991	26	20
1992	27	16
1993	28	26
1994	29	38
1995	30	45

==== Team podiums ====
- 2 podiums

No.	Season	Date	Location	Race	Level	Place	Teammates
1	1989–90	11 March 1990	Örnsköldsvik, Sweden	4 × 5 km Relay C/F	World Cup	2nd	Pedersen / Nybråten / Nilsen
2	1990–91	15 March 1991	Oslo, Norway	4 × 5 km Relay C/F	World Cup	3rd	Elveos / Wold / Skeime
