= Gudmund Skjeldal =

Norwegian cross-country skier and writer

Personal information
- Nationality: Norway
- Born: September 4, 1970 (age 55) Voss Municipality, Norway

Sport
- Sport: Skiing
- Club: Bulken IL

World Cup career
- Seasons: 5 – (1991–1995)
- Indiv. starts: 15
- Indiv. podiums: 1
- Indiv. wins: 0
- Team starts: 0
- Overall titles: 0 – (20th in 1993)

Gudmund Skjeldal (born 4 September 1970) is a Norwegian cross-country skier and writer.

He competed in the World Cup between 1991 and 1995. In March 1991 he finished eighth in the 50 kilometres in Oslo. He finished second in the same race two years later, and fourth over 15 kilometres in Štrbské Pleso later in March 1993.

He is the brother of Kristen Skjeldal, and was born in Voss Municipality. He holds the cand.philol. degree with a major in the history of ideas. He has worked as a school teacher, and wrote the books På villspor (1995) and Den siste langrennaren (2005), the latter a portrait of his brother. He fronts the environmental campaign Hvit Vinter ('White Winter').

== Cross-country skiing results ==
All results are sourced from the International Ski Federation (FIS).

=== World Cup ===
==== Season standings ====
Season	Age	Overall
1991	20	31
1992	21	42
1993	22	20
1994	23	36
1995	24	NC

==== Individual podiums ====
- 1 podium

No.	Season	Date	Location	Race	Level	Place
1	1992–93	13 March 1993	Oslo, Norway	50 km Individual C	World Cup	2nd
