= 1989–90 FIS Cross-Country World Cup =

Cross-country skiing competition

Discipline	Men	Women
Overall	(Norway) Vegard Ulvang	(Soviet Union) Larisa Lazutina
Nations Cup	Norway	Soviet Union
- Nations Cup Overall: Soviet Union

Competition
Locations	10 venues	10 venues
Individual	11 events	11 events
Relay/Team	5 events	6 events

The 1989–90 FIS Cross-Country World Cup was the 9th official World Cup season in cross-country skiing for men and women. The World Cup started in Soldier Hollow, United States, on 9 December 1989 and finished in Vang Municipality in Oppland county, Norway, on 17 March 1990. Vegard Ulvang of Norway won the overall men's cup, and Larisa Lazutina of the Soviet Union won the overall women's cup.

== Calendar ==
=== Men ===
C – Classic / F – Freestyle
No.	Date	Venue	Event	Winner	Second	Third	Ref.
1	9 December 1989	(United States) Salt Lake City	15 km C	(Norway) Bjørn Dæhlie	(Norway) Vegard Ulvang	(West Germany) Jochen Behle	
2	16 December 1989	(Canada) Canmore	15 km F	(Sweden) Christer Majbäck	(Norway) Bjørn Dæhlie	(Austria) Markus Gandler	
3	17 December 1989	(Canada) Canmore	50 km C	(West Germany) Jochen Behle	(Soviet Union) Igor Badamshin	(Italy) Maurilio De Zolt	
4	13 January 1990	(Soviet Union) Moscow	30 km F	(Sweden) Gunde Svan	(Norway) Vegard Ulvang	(Sweden) Torgny Mogren	
5	17 February 1990	(Switzerland) Campra	15 km F	(Norway) Bjørn Dæhlie	(Norway) Vegard Ulvang	(Sweden) Torgny Mogren	
6	21 February 1990	(Italy) Val di Fiemme	15 km C	(Sweden) Gunde Svan	(Norway) Vegard Ulvang	(Norway) Bjørn Dæhlie	
7	25 February 1990	(West Germany) Reit im Winkl	30 km F	(Soviet Union) Vladimir Smirnov	(Sweden) Torgny Mogren	(West Germany) Jochen Behle	
8	3 March 1990	(Finland) Lahti	15 km F + 15 km C Pursuit	(Norway) Bjørn Dæhlie	(Norway) Vegard Ulvang	(Sweden) Lars Håland	
9	6 March 1990	(Norway) Trondheim	15 km C	(Soviet Union) Alexey Prokourorov	(Sweden) Gunde Svan	(Sweden) Christer Majbäck	
10	10 March 1990	(Sweden) Örnsköldsvik	30 km C	(Norway) Terje Langli	(Finland) Harri Kirvesniemi	(Soviet Union) Vladimir Smirnov	
11	17 March 1990	(Norway) Vang	50 km F	(Sweden) Gunde Svan	(Sweden) Torgny Mogren	(Italy) Alfred Runggaldier	

=== Women ===
C – Classic / F – Freestyle
No.	Date	Venue	Event	Winner	Second	Third	Ref.
1	9 December 1989	(United States) Salt Lake City	5 km C	(Finland) Jaana Savolainen	(Finland) Tuulikki Pyykkonen	(Soviet Union) Svetlana Nageykina	
2	10 December 1989	(United States) Salt Lake City	15 km F	(Italy) Stefania Belmondo	(Soviet Union) Larisa Lazutina	(Soviet Union) Yelena Välbe	
3	15 December 1989	(Canada) Thunder Bay	15 km C	(Soviet Union) Larisa Lazutina	(Norway) Trude Dybendahl	(Soviet Union) Svetlana Nageykina	
4	14 January 1990	(Soviet Union) Moscow	30 km F	(Norway) Trude Dybendahl	(Soviet Union) Raissa Smetanina	(Soviet Union) Larisa Lazutina	
5	18 February 1990	(Switzerland) Pontresina	15 km F	(Italy) Manuela Di Centa	(Soviet Union) Yelena Välbe	(Soviet Union) Larisa Lazutina	
6	20 February 1990	(Italy) Val di Fiemme	10 km F	(Soviet Union) Yelena Välbe	(Soviet Union) Lyubov Yegorova	(Soviet Union) Svetlana Nageykina	
7	25 February 1990	(Socialist Federal Republic of Yugoslavia) Bohinj	10 km C	(Soviet Union) Svetlana Nageykina	(Soviet Union) Lyubov Yegorova	(Norway) Trude Dybendahl	
8	2 March 1990	(Finland) Lahti	5 km F	(Soviet Union) Yelena Välbe	(Soviet Union) Svetlana Nageykina	(Soviet Union) Larisa Lazutina	
9	7 March 1990	(Sweden) Sollefteå	30 km F	(Italy) Manuela Di Centa	(East Germany) Gabriele Hess	(Soviet Union) Yelena Välbe	
10	10 March 1990	(Sweden) Örnsköldsvik	10 km C	(Norway) Trude Dybendahl	(Italy) Manuela Di Centa	(Soviet Union) Larisa Lazutina	
11	17 March 1990	(Norway) Vang	10+10 km Pursuit	(Norway) Trude Dybendahl	(Soviet Union) Larisa Lazutina	(Soviet Union) Lyubov Yegorova	

=== Men's team ===
C – Classic / F – Freestyle
Date	Venue	Event	Winner	Second	Third	Ref.
10 December 1989	(United States) Salt Lake City	4 × 10 km relay C/F	Sweden Jan Ottosson; Christer Majbäck; Torgny Mogren; Gunde Svan	Norway I Pål Gunnar Mikkelsplass; Vegard Ulvang; Øyvind Skaanes; Bjørn Dæhlie	Norway II Arild Monsen; Erling Jevne; Torgeir Bjørn; Terje Langli	
22 February 1990	(Italy) Val di Fiemme	4 × 10 km relay C/F	Sweden Henrik Forsberg; Jan Ottosson; Christer Majbäck; Gunde Svan	Italy Maurilio De Zolt; Silvano Barco; Giorgio Vanzetta; Marco Albarello	Norway Øyvind Skaanes; Bjørn Dæhlie; Vegard Ulvang; Terje Langli	
1 March 1990	(Finland) Lahti	4 × 10 km relay F	Italy Silvio Fauner; Maurilio De Zolt; Giorgio Vanzetta; Alfred Runggaldier	Soviet Union Igor Badamshin; Alexey Prokourorov; Mikhail Botvinov; Vladimir Smirnov	Sweden Henrik Forsberg; Jan Ottosson; Torgny Mogren; Lars Håland	
11 March 1990	(Sweden) Örnsköldsvik	4 × 10 km relay C/F	Sweden Jan Ottosson; Christer Majbäck; Henrik Forsberg; Torgny Mogren	Norway Øyvind Skaanes; Sture Sivertsen; Vegard Ulvang; Terje Langli	Czechoslovakia Lubos Buchta; Ladislav Svanda; Radim Nyc; Vaclav Korunka	
16 March 1990	(Norway) Vang	4 × 10 km relay C/F	Norway Åge Skinstad; Terje Langli; Vegard Ulvang; Øyvind Skaanes	Sweden Torgny Mogren; Lars Håland; Christer Majbäck; Henrik Forsberg	Soviet Union Igor Badamshin; Alexander Golubev; Mikhail Botvinov; Vladimir Smirnov	

=== Women's team ===
C – Classic / F – Freestyle
Date	Venue	Event	Winner	Second	Third	Ref.
17 December 1989	(Canada) Thunder Bay	4 × 5 km relay C/F	Soviet Union Svetlana Nageykina; Larisa Lazutina; Tamara Tikhonova; Yelena Välbe	Finland Pirkko Määttä; Tuulikki Pyykkönen; Erja Kuivalainen; Jaana Savolainen	Norway Trude Dybendahl; Anne Jahren; Nina Skeime; Marit Elveos	
14 January 1990	(Soviet Union) Moscow	4 × 5 km relay C/F	Soviet Union Svetlana Nageykina; Larisa Lazutina; Tamara Tikhonova; Yelena Välbe	Sweden	Norway	
22 February 1990	(Italy) Val di Fiemme	4 × 5 km relay C/F	Soviet Union Svetlana Nageykina; Lyubov Yegorova; Tamara Tikhonova; Yelena Välbe	Norway Solveig Pedersen; Elin Nilsen; Anne Jahren; Trude Dybendahl	Finland Pirkko Määttä; Jaana Savolainen; Marjut Lukkarinen; Tuulikki Pyykkönen	
24 February 1990	(Socialist Federal Republic of Yugoslavia) Bohinj	4 × 5 km relay C/F	Soviet Union Elena Kaschirskaja; Raisa Smetanina; Tamara Tikhonova; Lyubov Yegorova	Norway Inger Helene Nybråten; Marit Wold; Marit Elveos; Nina Skeime	Sweden Karin Svingstedt; Magdalena Wallin; Marie-Helene Westin; Catrin Larsson	
4 March 1990	(Finland) Lahti	4 × 5 km relay F	Norway Solveig Pedersen; Inger Helene Nybråten; Anne Jahren; Trude Dybendahl	Soviet Union Svetlana Nageykina; Raisa Smetanina; Lyubov Yegorova; Larisa Lazutina	Finland Pirkko Määttä; Erja Kuivalainen; Eija Hyytiäinen; Tuulikki Pyykkönen	
11 March 1990	(Sweden) Örnsköldsvik	4 × 5 km relay C/F	Soviet Union Lyubov Yegorova; Larisa Lazutina; Tamara Tikhonova; Yelena Välbe	Norway Solveig Pedersen; Inger Helene Nybråten; Inger Lise Hegge; Elin Nilsen	Finland Tuulikki Pyykkönen; Pirkko Määttä; Erja Kuivalainen; Jaana Savolainen	

== Men's overall standings ==
Rank		Points
1	(Norway) Vegard Ulvang	145
2	(Sweden) Gunde Svan	144
3	(Norway) Bjørn Dæhlie	118
4	(West Germany) Jochen Behle	88
5	(Sweden) Christer Majbäck	86
6	(Sweden) Torgny Mogren	76
7	(Soviet Union) Vladimir Smirnov	74
8	(Norway) Terje Langli	52
9	(Sweden) Jan Ottosson	48
10	(Sweden) Lars Håland	43

== Women's overall standings ==
Rank		Points
1	(Soviet Union) Larisa Lazutina	146
2	(Soviet Union) Yelena Välbe	137
3	(Norway) Trude Dybendahl	136
4	(Soviet Union) Svetlana Nageykina	134
5	(Italy) Manuela Di Centa	126
6	(Soviet Union) Lyubov Yegorova	94
7	(Soviet Union) Tamara Tikhonova	76
8	(Italy) Stefania Belmondo	66
9	(Finland) Jaana Savolainen	52
10	(Finland) Tuulikki Pyykkönen	47

== Achievements ==
First World Cup career victory

Men

- (Norway) Bjørn Dæhlie, 22, in his 2nd season – the WC 1 (15 km C) in Salt Lake City; also first podium
- (Sweden) Christer Majbäck, 25, in his 6th season – the WC 2 (15 km F) in Calgary; first podium was 1984–85 WC 7 (15 km) in Syktyvkar
- (West Germany) Jochen Behle, 29, in his 9th season – the WC 3 (15 km F) in Calgary; first podium was 1981–82 WC 9 (15 km) in Štrbské Pleso
- (Norway) Terje Langli, 25, in his 4th season – the WC 10 (30 km C) in Örnsköldsvik; also first podium

Women

- (Italy) Stefania Belmondo, 20, in her 2nd season – the WC 2 (15 km F) in Salt Lake City; also first podium
- (Soviet Union) Larisa Lazutina, 24, in her 6th season – the WC 3 (15 km C) in Thunder Bay; first podium was 1986–87 WC 7 (20 km F) in Oberstdorf
- (Norway) Trude Dybendahl, 24, in her 5th season – the WC 4 (30 km F) in Moscow; first podium was 1988–89 WC 4 (15 km C) in Kavgolovo
- (Italy) Manuela Di Centa, 27, in her 6th season – the WC 5 (15 km F) in Pontresina; first podium was 1988–89 WC 5 (10 km C) in Klingenthal
- (Soviet Union) Svetlana Nageykina, 25, in her 5th season – the WC 7 (10 km C) in Bohinj; first podium was 1987–88 WC 10 (10 km F) in Rovaniemi

Victories in this World Cup (all-time number of victories as of 1989–90 season in parentheses)

Men

- Gunde Svan (SWE), 3 (29) first places
- Bjørn Dæhlie (NOR), 3 (3) first places
- Vladimir Smirnov (URS), 1 (4) first place
- Alexey Prokourorov (URS), 1 (3) first place
- Christer Majbäck (SWE), 1 (1) first place
- Jochen Behle (FRG), 1 (1) first place
- Terje Langli (NOR), 1 (1) first place

Women

- Trude Dybendahl (NOR), 3 (3) first places
- Yelena Välbe (URS), 2 (7) first places
- Manuela Di Centa (ITA), 2 (2) first places
- Jaana Savolainen (FIN), 1 (2) first place
- Stefania Belmondo (ITA), 1 (1) first place
- Larisa Lazutina (URS), 1 (1) first place
- Svetlana Nageykina (URS), 1 (1) first place
