= 1997–98 FIS Cross-Country World Cup =

Cross-country skiing competition

Discipline	Men	Women
Overall	(Norway) Thomas Alsgaard	(Russia) Larisa Lazutina (2nd title)
Long Distance	(Norway) Thomas Alsgaard	(Russia) Larisa Lazutina
Sprint	(Norway) Thomas Alsgaard	(Norway) Bente Martinsen
Nations Cup	Norway	Russia
- Nations Cup Overall: Norway

Competition
Locations	9 venues	9 venues
Individual	12 events	12 events
Relay/Team	4 events	4 events

The 1997–98 FIS Cross-Country World Cup was the 17th official World Cup season in cross-country skiing for men and women. The season began in Beitostølen, Norway, on 22 November 1997 and finished at Holmenkollen, Oslo, Norway, on 14 March 1998. Thomas Alsgaard of Norway won the overall men's cup, and Larisa Lazutina of Russia won the women's.

== Calendar ==
=== Men ===
C – Classic / F – Freestyle
WC	Date	Place	Discipline	Winner	Second	Third	Ref.
1	22 November 1997	(Norway) Beitostølen	10 km C	(Norway) Bjørn Dæhlie	(Kazakhstan) Vladimir Smirnov	(Norway) Erling Jevne	
2	10 December 1997	(Italy) Milan	Sprint F	(Finland) Ari Palolahti	(Sweden) Thobias Fredriksson	(Austria) Christian Hoffmann	
3	13 December 1997	(Italy) Val di Fiemme	10 km C	(Norway) Bjørn Dæhlie	(Norway) Sture Sivertsen	(Kazakhstan) Vladimir Smirnov	
4	14 December 1997	(Italy) Val di Fiemme	15 km F Pursuit	(Norway) Bjørn Dæhlie	(Norway) Thomas Alsgaard	(Austria) Mikhail Botvinov	
5	16 December 1997	(Italy) Val di Fiemme	15 km F	(Italy) Fulvio Valbusa	(Norway) Thomas Alsgaard	(Norway) Bjørn Dæhlie	
6	20 December 1997	(Switzerland) Davos	30 km C	(Norway) Bjørn Dæhlie	(Norway) Thomas Alsgaard	(Norway) Erling Jevne	
7	3 January 1998	(Russia) Kavgolovo	30 km F	(Finland) Mika Myllylä	(Norway) Thomas Alsgaard	(Italy) Fabio Maj	
8	8 January 1998	(Austria) Ramsau	15 km C	(Norway) Thomas Alsgaard	(Finland) Mika Myllylä	(Finland) Jari Isometsä	
9	10 January 1998	(Austria) Ramsau	30 km F	(Norway) Thomas Alsgaard	(Italy) Silvio Fauner	(Austria) Mikhail Botvinov	
1998 Winter Olympics (7–22 February)
10	8 March 1998	(Finland) Lahti	30 km C	(Kazakhstan) Vladimir Smirnov	(Norway) Thomas Alsgaard	(Norway) Frode Estil	
11	11 March 1998	(Sweden) Falun	10 km F	(Norway) Thomas Alsgaard	(Austria) Mikhail Botvinov	(Sweden) Per Elofsson	
12	14 March 1998	(Norway) Oslo	50 km C	(Russia) Alexey Prokurorov	(Norway) Odd-Bjørn Hjelmeset	(Norway) Bjørn Dæhlie	

=== Women ===
C – Classic / F – Freestyle
WC	Date	Place	Discipline	Winner	Second	Third	Ref.
1	22 November 1997	(Norway) Beitostølen	5 km C	(Russia) Larisa Lazutina	(Norway) Bente Martinsen	(Czech Republic) Kateřina Neumannová	
2	10 December 1997	(Italy) Milan	Sprint F	(Norway) Bente Martinsen	(Norway) Trude Dybendahl	(Norway) Anita Moen	
3	13 December 1997	(Italy) Val di Fiemme	5 km C	(Norway) Bente Martinsen	(Norway) Anita Moen	(Russia) Larisa Lazutina	
4	16 December 1997	(Italy) Val di Fiemme	15 km F	(Russia) Larisa Lazutina	(Italy) Sabina Valbusa	(Italy) Stefania Belmondo	
5	20 December 1997	(Switzerland) Davos	15 km C	(Russia) Yelena Välbe	(Russia) Svetlana Nageykina	(Norway) Anita Moen	
6	4 January 1998	(Russia) Kavgolovo	10 km F	(Russia) Yuliya Chepalova	(Italy) Stefania Belmondo	(Russia) Larisa Lazutina	
7	8 January 1998	(Austria) Ramsau	10 km C	(Norway) Marit Mikkelsplass	(Norway) Bente Martinsen	(Czech Republic) Kateřina Neumannová	
8	9 January 1998	(Austria) Ramsau	5 km C	(Norway) Bente Martinsen	(Russia) Larisa Lazutina	(Czech Republic) Kateřina Neumannová	
9	11 January 1998	(Austria) Ramsau	10 km F Pursuit	(Italy) Stefania Belmondo	(Russia) Larisa Lazutina	(Norway) Marit Mikkelsplass	
1998 Winter Olympics (7–22 February)
10	7 March 1998	(Finland) Lahti	15 km F	(Italy) Stefania Belmondo	(Russia) Larisa Lazutina	(Russia) Svetlana Nageykina	
11	11 March 1998	(Sweden) Falun	5 km F	(Russia) Larisa Lazutina	(Italy) Stefania Belmondo	(Russia) Yuliya Chepalova	
12	14 March 1998	(Norway) Oslo	30 km C	(Russia) Larisa Lazutina	(Russia) Svetlana Nageykina	(Norway) Anita Moen	

=== Men's team ===
WC	Date	Place	Discipline	Winner	Second	Third	Ref.
1	23 November 1997	(Norway) Beitostølen	4 × 10 km relay C	Norway I Thomas Alsgaard; Anders Eide; Erling Jevne; Bjørn Dæhlie	Finland Jari Isometsä; Harri Kirvesniemi; Sami Repo; Kuisma Taipale	Norway II Sture Sivertsen; Frode Estil; Anders Aukland; Øyvind Skaanes	
2	11 January 1998	(Austria) Ramsau	4 × 10 km relay C/F	Italy Fabio Maj; Fulvio Valbusa; Pietro Piller Cottrer; Silvio Fauner	Sweden Mathias Fredriksson; Niklas Jonsson; Per Elofsson; Torgny Mogren	Austria Mikhail Botvinov; Alois Stadlober; Christian Hoffmann; Achim Walcher	
3	6 March 1998	(Finland) Lahti	4 × 10 km relay C/F	Finland I Harri Kirvesniemi; Mika Myllylä; Sami Repo; Jari Isometsä	Norway Frode Estil; Sture Sivertsen; Anders Eide; Thomas Alsgaard	Russia I Vladimir Legotine; Alexey Prokurorov; Andrey Noutrikhin; Sergey Chepikov	
4	10 March 1998	(Sweden) Falun	Team Sprint C/F	Sweden I Mathias Fredriksson; Per Elofsson	Norway Rune Torseth; Tor Arne Hetland	Finland I Jari Isometsä; Ari Palolahti	

=== Women's team ===
WC	Date	Place	Discipline	Winner	Second	Third	Ref.
1	23 November 1997	(Norway) Beitostølen	4 × 5 km relay C	Russia I Natalya Baranova-Masalkina; Olga Danilova; Nina Gavrylyuk; Larisa Lazutina	Norway I Anita Moen; Marit Mikkelsplass; Trude Dybendahl; Bente Martinsen	Italy Karin Moroder; Stefania Belmondo; Sabina Valbusa; Gabriella Paruzzi	
2	14 December 1997	(Italy) Val di Fiemme	4 × 5 km relay F	Russia I Svetlana Nageykina; Yelena Välbe; Larisa Lazutina; Olga Danilova	Italy Gabriella Paruzzi; Manuela Di Centa; Sabina Valbusa; Stefania Belmondo	Russia II Natalya Baranova-Masalkina; Olga Zavyalova; Yuliya Chepalova; Nina Gavrylyuk	
3	6 March 1998	(Finland) Lahti	4 × 5 km relay C/F	Russia I Olga Danilova; Larisa Lazutina; Nina Gavrylyuk; Yuliya Chepalova	Norway Bente Martinsen; Marit Mikkelsplass; Elin Nilsen; Trude Dybendahl	Russia II Svetlana Nageykina; Natalya Baranova-Masalkina; Olga Zavyalova; Irina Skladneva	
4	10 March 1998	(Sweden) Falun	Team Sprint C/F	Switzerland Sylvia Honegger; Brigitte Albrecht-Loretan	France Sophie Villeneuve; Karine Philippot	Russia I Irina Skladneva; Olga Danilova	

== Men's standings ==
=== Overall ===
Rank	after all 12 events	Points
1	(Norway) Thomas Alsgaard	790
2	(Norway) Bjørn Dæhlie	678
3	(Kazakhstan) Vladimir Smirnov	431
4	(Austria) Mikhail Botvinov	330
5	(Finland) Jari Isometsä	316
6	(Italy) Fulvio Valbusa	310
7	(Finland) Mika Myllylä	308
8	(Norway) Erling Jevne	292
9	(Italy) Silvio Fauner	273
10	(Sweden) Mathias Fredriksson	268

=== Long Distance ===
Rank	after all events	Points
1	(Norway) Thomas Alsgaard	351
2	(Finland) Mika Myllylä	196
	(Norway) Bjørn Dæhlie	196
4	(Kazakhstan) Vladimir Smirnov	184
5	(Finland) Jari Isometsä	176
6	(Russia) Alexey Prokurorov	156
7	(Italy) Fabio Maj	155
8	(Italy) Silvio Fauner	145
9	(Norway) Frode Estil	142
10	(Norway) Erling Jevne	131

=== Sprint ===
Rank	after all events	Points
1	(Norway) Thomas Alsgaard	486
2	(Norway) Bjørn Dæhlie	482
3	(Kazakhstan) Vladimir Smirnov	247
4	(Austria) Mikhail Botvinov	230
5	(Italy) Fulvio Valbusa	226
6	(Sweden) Henrik Forsberg	191
7	(Norway) Erling Jevne	161
8	(Sweden) Mathias Fredriksson	148
9	(Finland) Jari Isometsä	140
10	(Sweden) Per Elofsson	130

== Women's standings ==
=== Overall ===
Rank	after all 12 events	Points
1	(Russia) Larisa Lazutina	773
2	(Norway) Bente Martinsen	625
3	(Italy) Stefania Belmondo	544
4	(Norway) Anita Moen	462
5	(Norway) Marit Mikkelsplass	416
6	(Russia) Olga Danilova	363
7	(Norway) Trude Dybendahl	333
8	(Ukraine) Iryna Taranenko-Terelia	329
9	(Russia) Yuliya Chepalova	314
10	(Russia) Nina Gavrylyuk	279

=== Long Distance ===
Rank	after all events	Points
1	(Russia) Larisa Lazutina	293
2	(Italy) Stefania Belmondo	208
3	(Russia) Olga Danilova	164
4	(Russia) Yelena Välbe	136
5	(Norway) Marit Mikkelsplass	135
6	(Norway) Anita Moen	126
7	(Ukraine) Iryna Taranenko-Terelia	123
	(Russia) Yuliya Chepalova	123
9	(Norway) Bente Martinsen	106
10	(Italy) Sabina Valbusa	105

=== Sprint ===
Rank	after all events	Points
1	(Norway) Bente Martinsen	525
2	(Russia) Larisa Lazutina	480
3	(Italy) Stefania Belmondo	355
4	(Norway) Anita Moen	336
5	(Norway) Marit Mikkelsplass	281
6	(Norway) Trude Dybendahl	244
7	(Ukraine) Iryna Taranenko-Terelia	206
8	(Russia) Nina Gavrylyuk	204
9	(Czech Republic) Kateřina Neumannová	200
10	(Russia) Olga Danilova	199

== Achievements ==
Victories in this World Cup (all-time number of victories as of 1997/98 season in parentheses)

Men

- Bjørn Dæhlie (NOR), 4 (41) first places
- Thomas Alsgaard (NOR), 3 (4) first places
- Vladimir Smirnov (KAZ), 1 (30) first place
- Mika Myllylä (FIN), 1 (4) first place
- Ari Palolahti (FIN), 1 (1) first place
- Fulvio Valbusa (ITA), 1 (1) first place
- Alexey Prokurorov (RUS), 1 (9) first place

Women

- Larisa Lazutina (RUS), 4 (12) first places
- Bente Martinsen (NOR), 3 (3) first places
- Stefania Belmondo (ITA), 2 (17) first places
- Yelena Välbe (RUS), 1 (45) first place
- Marit Mikkelsplass (NOR), 1 (2) first place
- Yuliya Chepalova (RUS), 1 (1) first place
