= 1992–93 FIS Cross-Country World Cup =

Cross-country skiing competition

Discipline	Men	Women
Overall	(Norway) Bjørn Dæhlie (2nd title)	(Russia) Lyubov Yegorova
Nations Cup	Norway	Russia
- Nations Cup Overall: Norway

Competition
Locations	9 venues	9 venues
Individual	13 events	12 events
Relay/Team	6 events	6 events

The 1992–93 FIS Cross-Country World Cup was the 12th official World Cup season in cross-country skiing for men and women. The World Cup started in Ramsau, Austria, on 12 December 1992 and finished in Štrbské Pleso, Slovakia, on 20 March 1993. Bjørn Dæhlie of Norway won the overall men's event, and Lyubov Yegorova of Russia won the women's.

== Calendar ==
=== Men ===
C – Classic / F – Freestyle
No.	Date	Venue	Event	Winner	Second	Third	Ref.
1	12 December 1992	(Austria) Ramsau	10 km F	(Norway) Vegard Ulvang	(Kazakhstan) Vladimir Smirnov	(Czechoslovakia) Václav Korunka	
2	13 December 1992	(Austria) Ramsau	15 km C	(Norway) Bjørn Dæhlie	(Norway) Vegard Ulvang	(Kazakhstan) Vladimir Smirnov	
3	18 December 1992	(Italy) Val di Fiemme	30 km F	(Kazakhstan) Vladimir Smirnov	(Russia) Mikhail Botvinov	(Russia) Alexey Prokurorov	
4	3 January 1993	(Russia) Kavgolovo	30 km C	(Norway) Bjørn Dæhlie	(Russia) Mikhail Botvinov	(Sweden) Torgny Mogren	
5	9 January 1993	(Switzerland) Ulrichen	15 km C	(Italy) Marco Albarello	(Norway) Vegard Ulvang	(Norway) Bjørn Dæhlie	
6	16 January 1993	(Slovenia) Bohinj	15 km F	(Kazakhstan) Vladimir Smirnov	(Sweden) Torgny Mogren	(Norway) Bjørn Dæhlie	
World Championships 1993 (19–28 February)
7	20 February 1993	(Sweden) Falun	30 km C	(Norway) Bjørn Dæhlie	(Norway) Vegard Ulvang	(Kazakhstan) Vladimir Smirnov	
8	22 February 1993	(Sweden) Falun	10 km C	(Norway) Sture Sivertsen	(Kazakhstan) Vladimir Smirnov	(Norway) Vegard Ulvang	
9	24 February 1993	(Sweden) Falun	15 km F Pursuit	(Norway) Bjørn Dæhlie	(Kazakhstan) Vladimir Smirnov	(Italy) Silvio Fauner	
10	28 February 1993	(Sweden) Falun	50 km F	(Sweden) Torgny Mogren	(France) Hervé Balland	(Norway) Bjørn Dæhlie	
11	6 March 1993	(Finland) Lahti	30 km F	(Sweden) Torgny Mogren	(Kazakhstan) Vladimir Smirnov	(Czech Republic) Václav Korunka	
12	13 March 1993	(Norway) Oslo	50 km C	(Russia) Alexey Prokurorov	(Norway) Gudmund Skjeldal	(Norway) Sture Sivertsen	
13	13 March 1993	(Slovakia) Štrbské Pleso	15 km C	(Norway) Bjørn Dæhlie	(Italy) Marco Albarello	(Italy) Silvio Fauner	

=== Women ===
C – Classic / F – Freestyle
No.	Date	Venue	Event	Winner	Second	Third	Ref.
1	12 December 1992	(Austria) Ramsau	5 km C	(Czechoslovakia) Kateřina Neumannová	(Russia) Yelena Välbe	(Russia) Larisa Lazutina	
2	18 December 1992	(Italy) Val di Fiemme	15 km F	(Russia) Lyubov Yegorova	(Russia) Larisa Lazutina	(Russia) Yelena Välbe	
3	3 January 1993	(Russia) Kavgolovo	30 km C	(Russia) Lyubov Yegorova	(Russia) Yelena Välbe	(Norway) Trude Dybendahl	
4	9 January 1993	(Switzerland) Ulrichen	10 km C	(Russia) Yelena Välbe	(Finland) Marja-Liisa Kirvesniemi	(Italy) Stefania Belmondo	
5	16 January 1993	(Italy) Cogne	10 km F	(Italy) Stefania Belmondo	(Russia) Yelena Välbe	(Russia) Lyubov Yegorova	
World Championships 1993 (19–28 February)
6	19 February 1993	(Sweden) Falun	15 km C	(Russia) Yelena Välbe	(Finland) Marja-Liisa Kirvesniemi	(Finland) Marjut Rolig	
7	21 February 1993	(Sweden) Falun	5 km C	(Russia) Larisa Lazutina	(Russia) Lyubov Yegorova	(Norway) Trude Dybendahl	
8	23 February 1993	(Sweden) Falun	10 km F Pursuit	(Italy) Stefania Belmondo	(Russia) Larisa Lazutina	(Russia) Lyubov Yegorova	
9	27 February 1993	(Sweden) Falun	30 km F	(Italy) Stefania Belmondo	(Italy) Manuela Di Centa	(Russia) Lyubov Yegorova	
10	6 March 1993	(Finland) Lahti	5 km C	(Russia) Lyubov Yegorova	(Italy) Manuela Di Centa	(Italy) Stefania Belmondo	
11	9 March 1993	(Norway) Lillehammer	10 km F Pursuit	(Russia) Lyubov Yegorova	(Italy) Manuela Di Centa	(Russia) Yelena Välbe	
12	19 March 1993	(Slovakia) Štrbské Pleso	10 km C	(Russia) Yelena Välbe	(Russia) Lyubov Yegorova	(Italy) Manuela Di Centa	

Note: Until FIS Nordic World Ski Championships 1999, World Championship races are part of the World Cup. Hence results from those races are included in the World Cup overall.

=== Men's team ===
C – Classic / F – Freestyle
WC	Date	Place	Discipline	Winner	Second	Third	Ref.
1	20 December 1992	(Italy) Val di Fiemme	4 × 10 km relay C	Russia I Andrey Kirillov; Alexei Prokourorov; Igor Badamshin; Mikhail Botvinov	Italy I Silvio Fauner; Giuseppe Pulie; Giorgio Vanzetta; Marco Albarello	Norway Terje Langli; Erling Jevne; Vegard Ulvang; Bjørn Dæhlie	
2	10 January 1993	(Switzerland) Ulrichen	4 × 10 km relay F	Italy Fulvio Valbusa; Giorgio Vanzetta; Marco Albarello; Silvio Fauner	Norway I Sture Sivertsen; Sigurd Brørs; Vegard Ulvang; Bjørn Dæhlie	Sweden I Jan Ottosson; Christer Majbäck; Lars Håland; Torgny Mogren	
3	26 February 1993	(Sweden) Falun	4 × 10 km relay C/F	Norway Sture Sivertsen; Vegard Ulvang; Terje Langli; Bjørn Dæhlie	Italy Maurilio De Zolt; Marco Albarello; Giorgio Vanzetta; Silvio Fauner	Russia Andrey Kirillov; Igor Badamchin; Alexey Prokurorov; Mikhail Botvinov	
4	5 March 1993	(Finland) Lahti	4 × 10 km relay C	Sweden Christer Majbäck; Niklas Jonsson; Torgny Mogren; Lars Håland	Russia I Aleksandr Vorobyov; Igor Badamshin; Alexei Prokourorov; Mikhail Botvinov	Finland I Mika Kuusisto; Juha Hauta-Aho; Sami Repo; Heikki Alakärppä	
5	10 March 1993	(Norway) Lillehammer	4 × 10 km relay C/F	Norway I Terje Langli; Sture Sivertsen; Krister Sørgård; Thomas Alsgaard	Sweden I Niklas Jonsson; Torgny Mogren; Mathias Fredriksson; Henrik Forsberg	Finland Juha Hauta-Aho; Harri Kirvesniemi; Jari Isometsä; Jukka Hartonen	
6	20 March 1993	(Slovakia) Štrbské Pleso	4 × 10 km relay F	Norway I Krister Sørgård; Vegard Ulvang; Thomas Alsgaard; Bjørn Dæhlie	Italy Fulvio Valbusa; Roberto De Zolt Ponte; Marco Albarello; Silvio Fauner	Norway II Terje Langli; Gudmund Skjeldal; Erling Jevne; Sture Sivertsen	

=== Women's team ===
C – Classic / F – Freestyle
WC	Date	Place	Discipline	Winner	Second	Third	Ref.
1	20 December 1992	(Italy) Val di Fiemme	4 × 5 km relay C	Norway I Marianne Dahlmo; Marit Wold; Inger Helene Nybråten; Trude Dybendahl	Russia I Larisa Lazutina; Yelena Välbe; Nina Gavrylyuk; Lyubov Yegorova	Finland Tuulikki Pyykkönen; Marjut Rolig; Pirkko Määttä; Jaana Savolainen	
2	10 January 1993	(Switzerland) Ulrichen	4 × 5 km relay F	Russia Svetlana Nageykina; Yelena Välbe; Larisa Lazutina; Lyubov Yegorova	Italy Manuela Di Centa; Bice Vanzetta; Gabriella Paruzzi; Stefania Belmondo	Norway I Trude Dybendahl; Marit Wold; Elin Nilsen; Marianne Dahlmo	
3	17 January 1993	(Italy) Cogne	4 × 5 km relay C/F	Russia Svetlana Nageykina; Larisa Lazutina; Lyubov Yegorova; Yelena Välbe	Italy Bice Vanzetta; Gabriella Paruzzi; Manuela Di Centa; Stefania Belmondo	Norway Anita Moen; Marianne Myklebust; Inger Lise Hegge; Elin Nilsen	
4	26 February 1993	(Sweden) Falun	4 × 5 km relay C/F	Russia Yelena Välbe; Larisa Lazutina; Nina Gavrylyuk; Lyubov Yegorova	Italy Gabriella Paruzzi; Bice Vanzetta; Manuela Di Centa; Stefania Belmondo	Norway Trude Dybendahl; Inger Helene Nybråten; Anita Moen; Elin Nilsen	
5	13 March 1993	(Norway) Oslo	4 × 5 km relay C	Russia Svetlana Nageykina; Yelena Välbe; Larisa Lazutina; Lyubov Yegorova	Norway I Anita Moen; Inger Helene Nybråten; Elin Nilsen; Trude Dybendahl	Czech Republic / Slovakia Ľubomíra Balážová; Alžbeta Havrančíková; Iveta Zelingerová; Kateřina Neumannová	
6	20 March 1993	(Slovakia) Štrbské Pleso	4 × 5 km relay F	Russia Nina Gavrylyuk; Yelena Välbe; Larisa Lazutina; Lyubov Yegorova	Italy Sabina Valbusa; Gabriella Paruzzi; Manuela Di Centa; Stefania Belmondo	Norway Anita Moen; Elin Nilsen; Inger Lise Hegge; Trude Dybendahl	

== Overall standings ==
=== Men's standings ===
Rank		Points
1	(Norway) Bjørn Dæhlie	696
2	(Kazakhstan) Vladimir Smirnov	649
3	(Norway) Vegard Ulvang	576
4	(Sweden) Torgny Mogren	488
5	(Italy) Marco Albarello	351
6	(Italy) Silvio Fauner	308
7	(Russia) Mikhail Botvinov	292
8	(Norway) Sture Sivertsen	285
9	(Russia) Alexey Prokurorov	251
10	(Norway) Terje Langli	234

=== Women's standings ===
Rank		Points
1	(Russia) Lyubov Yegorova	760
2	(Russia) Yelena Välbe	710
3	(Italy) Stefania Belmondo	596
4	(Russia) Larisa Lazutina	519
5	(Italy) Manuela Di Centa	511
6	(Norway) Trude Dybendahl	396
7	(Czech Republic) Kateřina Neumannová	356
8	(Finland) Marja-Liisa Kirvesniemi	286
9	(Finland) Marjut Rolig	285
10	(Norway) Anita Moen	259

== Achievements ==
Victories in this World Cup (all-time number of victories as of 1992/93 season in parentheses)

Men

- Bjørn Dæhlie (NOR), 5 (16) first places
- Torgny Mogren (SWE), 2 (12) first places
- Vladimir Smirnov (KAZ), 2 (9) first places
- Vegard Ulvang (NOR), 1 (9) first place
- Alexey Prokurorov (RUS), 1 (4) first place
- Marco Albarello (ITA), 1 (2) first place
- Sture Sivertsen (NOR), 1 (1) first place

Women

- Lyubov Yegorova (RUS), 4 (7) first places
- Yelena Välbe (RUS), 3 (22) first places
- Stefania Belmondo (ITA), 3 (9) first places
- Larisa Lazutina (RUS), 1 (2) first place
- Katerina Neumannova (TCH), 1 (1) first place
