= 1990–91 FIS Cross-Country World Cup =

Cross-country skiing competition

| Discipline | Men | Women |
| Overall | (Soviet Union) Vladimir Smirnov | (Soviet Union) Yelena Välbe (2nd title) |
| Nations Cup | Norway | Soviet Union |
- Nations Cup Overall: Soviet Union

Competition
| Locations | 9 venues | 9 venues |
| Individual | 12 events | 12 events |
| Relay/Team | 5 events | 5 events |

The 1990–91 FIS Cross-Country World Cup was the 10th official World Cup season in cross-country skiing for men and women. The World Cup started in Tauplitzalm, Austria, on 8 December 1990 and finished at Holmenkollen, Oslo, Norway, on 16 March 1991. Vladimir Smirnov of the Soviet Union won the overall men's cup, and Yelena Välbe of the Soviet Union won the women's.

== Calendar ==
=== Men ===
C – Classic / F – Freestyle
| No. | Date | Venue | Event | Winner | Second | Third | Ref. |
|---|---|---|---|---|---|---|---|
| 1 | 9 December 1990 | (Austria) Tauplitzalm | 10 km C + 15 km F Pursuit | (Sweden) Torgny Mogren | (Soviet Union) Vladimir Smirnov | (Sweden) Henrik Forsberg | |
| 2 | 15 December 1990 | (Switzerland) Davos | 15 km C | (Soviet Union) Vladimir Smirnov | (Italy) Marco Albarello | (Sweden) Thomas Eriksson | |
| 3 | 19 December 1990 | (France) Les Saisies | 30 km C | (Soviet Union) Vladimir Smirnov | (Sweden) Torgny Mogren | (Sweden) Christer Majbäck | |
| 4 | 5 January 1991 | (Soviet Union) Minsk | 15 km F | (Soviet Union) Vladimir Smirnov | (Norway) Bjørn Dæhlie | (Czechoslovakia) Václav Korunka (Sweden) Henrik Forsberg | |
| 5 | 9 January 1991 | (Czechoslovakia) Strbske Pleso | 30 km F | (Norway) Bjørn Dæhlie | (Italy) Silvano Barco | (Italy) Gianfranco Polvara | |
FIS Nordic World Ski Championships 1991 (7–17 February)
| 6 | 7 February 1991 | (Italy) Val di Fiemme | 30 km C | (Sweden) Gunde Svan | (Soviet Union) Vladimir Smirnov | (Norway) Vegard Ulvang | |
| 7 | 9 February 1991 | (Italy) Val di Fiemme | 15 km F | (Norway) Bjørn Dæhlie | (Sweden) Gunde Svan | (Soviet Union) Vladimir Smirnov | |
| 8 | 11 February 1991 | (Italy) Val di Fiemme | 10 km C | (Norway) Terje Langli | (Sweden) Christer Majbäck | (Sweden) Torgny Mogren | |
| 9 | 17 February 1991 | (Italy) Val di Fiemme | 50 km F | (Sweden) Torgny Mogren | (Sweden) Gunde Svan | (Italy) Maurilio De Zolt | |
| 10 | 3 March 1991 | (Finland) Lahti | 30 km F | (Norway) Kristen Skjeldal | (Soviet Union) Vladimir Smirnov | (Italy) Gianfranco Polvara | |
| 11 | 9 March 1991 | (Sweden) Falun | 30 km F | (Sweden) Henrik Forsberg | (Sweden) Torgny Mogren | (Sweden) Jan Ottosson | |
| 12 | 16 March 1991 | (Norway) Oslo | 50 km C | (Norway) Vegard Ulvang | (Finland) Harri Kirvesniemi | (Norway) Sture Sivertsen | |

=== Women ===
C – Classic / F – Freestyle
| No. | Date | Venue | Event | Winner | Second | Third | Ref. |
|---|---|---|---|---|---|---|---|
| 1 | 8 December 1990 | (Austria) Tauplitzalm | 10 km C + 15 km F Pursuit | (Italy) Stefania Belmondo | (Soviet Union) Yelena Välbe | (Soviet Union) Tamara Tikhonova | |
| 2 | 15 December 1990 | (Switzerland) Davos | 15 km C | (Soviet Union) Yelena Välbe | (Soviet Union) Lyubov Yegorova | (Sweden) Marie-Helene Westin | |
| 3 | 20 December 1990 | (France) Les Saisies | 5 km C + 10 km F Pursuit | (Soviet Union) Yelena Välbe | (Italy) Stefania Belmondo | (Soviet Union) Lyubov Yegorova | |
| 4 | 5 January 1991 | (Soviet Union) Minsk | 30 km C | (Soviet Union) Yelena Välbe | (Soviet Union) Svetlana Nageykina | (Norway) Inger Helene Nybråten | |
| 5 | 12 January 1991 | (Germany) Klingenthal | 15 km C | (Norway) Inger Helene Nybråten | (Sweden) Marie-Helene Westin | (Norway) Solveig Pedersen | |
FIS Nordic World Ski Championships 1991 (7–17 February)
| 6 | 8 February 1991 | (Italy) Val di Fiemme | 15 km C | (Soviet Union) Yelena Välbe | (Norway) Trude Dybendahl | (Italy) Stefania Belmondo | |
| 7 | 10 February 1991 | (Italy) Val di Fiemme | 10 km F | (Soviet Union) Yelena Välbe | (Sweden) Marie-Helene Westin | (Soviet Union) Tamara Tikhonova | |
| 8 | 12 February 1991 | (Italy) Val di Fiemme | 5 km C | (Norway) Trude Dybendahl | (Finland) Marja-Liisa Kirvesniemi | (Italy) Manuela Di Centa | |
| 9 | 16 February 1991 | (Italy) Val di Fiemme | 30 km F | (Soviet Union) Lyubov Yegorova | (Soviet Union) Yelena Välbe | (Italy) Manuela Di Centa | |
| 10 | 2 March 1991 | (Finland) Lahti | 15 km F | (Soviet Union) Yelena Välbe | (Italy) Manuela Di Centa | (Soviet Union) Lyubov Yegorova | |
| 11 | 9 March 1991 | (Sweden) Falun | 15 km F | (Soviet Union) Yelena Välbe | (Soviet Union) Tamara Tikhonova | (Soviet Union) Lyubov Yegorova | |
| 12 | 16 March 1991 | (Norway) Oslo | 5 km F | (Soviet Union) Yelena Välbe | (Italy) Manuela Di Centa | (Sweden) Marie-Helene Westin | |

Note: Until 1999 World Championships, World Championship races are part of the World Cup. Hence results from those races are included in the World Cup overall.

=== Men's team ===
C – Classic / F – Freestyle
| Date | Venue | Event | Winner | Second | Third | Ref. |
|---|---|---|---|---|---|---|
| 16 December 1990 | (Switzerland) Davos | 4 × 10 km relay C/F | Sweden I Thomas Eriksson; Gunde Svan; Christer Majbäck; Torgny Mogren | Italy I Silvio Fauner; Giorgio Vanzetta; Marco Albarello; Silvano Barco | Norway I Øyvind Skaanes; Terje Langli; Sture Sivertsen; Bjørn Dæhlie | |
| 20 December 1990 | (France) Les Saisies | 4 × 10 km relay C/F | Sweden I Thomas Eriksson; Christer Majbäck; Torgny Mogren; Henrik Forsberg | Italy Maurilio De Zolt; Giorgio Vanzetta; Marco Albarello; Silvio Fauner | Sweden II Jan Ottosson; Lars Håland; Anders Bergström; Niklas Jonsson | |
| 6 January 1991 | (Soviet Union) Minsk | 4 × 10 km relay C/F | Norway I Øyvind Skaanes; Terje Langli; Vegard Ulvang; Bjørn Dæhlie | Norway II Kristen Skjeldal; Erling Jevne; Tom Kristian Vold; Sture Sivertsen | Sweden Niklas Jonsson; Sven-Erik Danielsson; Christer Majbäck; Henrik Forsberg | |
| 15 February 1991 | (Italy) Val di Fiemme | 4 × 10 km relay C/F | Norway Øyvind Skaanes; Terje Langli; Vegard Ulvang; Bjørn Dæhlie | Sweden Thomas Eriksson; Christer Majbäck; Gunde Svan; Torgny Mogren | Finland Mika Kuusisto; Harri Kirvesniemi; Jari Isometsä; Jari Räsänen | |
| 1 March 1991 | (Finland) Lahti | 4 × 10 km relay C/F | Norway I Terje Langli; Øyvind Skaanes; Bjørn Dæhlie; Kristen Skjeldal | Sweden I Thomas Eriksson; Gunde Svan; Torgny Mogren; Henrik Forsberg | Soviet Union Mikhail Botvinov; Igor Badamshin; Vyacheslav Plaksunov; Alexei Prokourorov | |

=== Women's team ===
C – Classic / F – Freestyle
| Date | Venue | Event | Winner | Second | Third | Ref. |
|---|---|---|---|---|---|---|
| 16 December 1990 | (Switzerland) Davos | 4 × 5 km relay C/F | Soviet Union Svetlana Nageykina; Lyubov Yegorova; Tamara Tikhonova; Yelena Välbe | Italy Bice Vanzetta; Manuela Di Centa; Gabriella Paruzzi; Stefania Belmondo | Norway Elin Nilsen; Inger Lise Hegge; Solveig Pedersen; Trude Dybendahl | |
| 13 January 1991 | (Germany) Klingenthal | 4 × 5 km relay C/F | Soviet Union Solveig Pedersen; Marit Elveos; Nina Skeime; Inger Helene Nybråten | Germany I Heike Wezel; Gabriele Hess; Sigrid Wille; Simone Opitz | Italy Bice Vanzetta; Manuela Di Centa; Gabriella Paruzzi; Stefania Belmondo | |
| 15 February 1991 | (Italy) Val di Fiemme | 4 × 5 km relay C/F | Soviet Union Lyubov Yegorova; Raisa Smetanina; Tamara Tikhonova; Yelena Välbe | Italy Bice Vanzetta; Manuela Di Centa; Gabriella Paruzzi; Stefania Belmondo | Norway Solveig Pedersen; Inger Helene Nybråten; Elin Nilsen; Trude Dybendahl | |
| 10 March 1991 | (Sweden) Falun | 4 × 5 km relay C | Soviet Union Svetlana Nageykina; Lyubov Yegorova; Tamara Tikhonova; Yelena Välbe | Norway Solveig Pedersen; Inger Helene Nybråten; Elin Nilsen; Trude Dybendahl | Finland Marjut Lukkarinen; Merja Kuusisto; Jaana Savolainen; Marja-Liisa Kirvesniemi | |
| 15 March 1991 | (Norway) Oslo | 4 × 5 km relay C/F | Norway I Trude Dybendahl; Inger Helene Nybråten; Solveig Pedersen; Elin Nilsen | Soviet Union Svetlana Nageykina; Raisa Smetanina; Tamara Tikhonova; Yelena Välbe | Norway II Marit Elveos; Marit Wold; Inger Lise Hegge; Nina Skeime | |

== Overall standings ==
=== Men's standings ===
| Place | Skier | Country | Points |
|---|---|---|---|
| 1. | Vladimir Smirnov | (Soviet Union) | 163 |
| 2. | Torgny Mogren | (Sweden) | 129 |
| 3. | Bjørn Dæhlie | (Norway) | 105 |
| 3. | Vegard Ulvang | (Norway) | 105 |
| 5. | Kristen Skjeldal | (Norway) | 76 |
| 6. | Henrik Forsberg | (Sweden) | 73 |
| 6. | Terje Langli | (Norway) | 73 |
| 7. | Gunde Svan | (Sweden) | 65 |
| 9. | Marco Albarello | (Italy) | 62 |
| 9. | Maurilio De Zolt | (Italy) | 62 |

=== Women's standings ===
| Place | Skier | Country | Points |
|---|---|---|---|
| 1. | Yelena Välbe | (Soviet Union) | 220 |
| 2. | Stefania Belmondo | (Italy) | 128 |
| 3. | Lyubov Yegorova | (Soviet Union) | 126 |
| 4. | Marie-Helene Westin | (Sweden) | 112 |
| 5. | Manuela Di Centa | (Italy) | 106 |
| 6. | Trude Dybendahl | (Norway) | 88 |
| 7. | Tamara Tichonova | (Soviet Union) | 82 |
| 8. | Inger Helene Nybråten | (Norway) | 62 |
| 9. | Solveig Pedersen | (Norway) | 57 |
| 10. | Marjut Rolig | (Finland) | 46 |

== Achievements ==
Victories in this World Cup (all-time number of victories as of 1990–91 season in parentheses)

Men

- Vladimir Smirnov (USSR), 3 (7) first places
- Torgny Mogren (SWE), 2 (9) first places
- Bjørn Dæhlie (NOR), 2 (5) first places
- Gunde Svan (SWE), 1 (30) first place
- Vegard Ulvang (NOR), 1 (3) first place
- Terje Langli (NOR), 1 (2) first place
- Kristen Skjeldal (NOR), 1 (1) first place
- Henrik Forsberg (SWE), 1 (1) first place

Women

- Yelena Välbe (URS), 8 (15) first places
- Stefania Belmondo (ITA), 1 (2) first place
- Trude Dybendahl (NOR), 1 (4) first place
- Inger Helene Nybråten (NOR), 1 (3) first place
- Lyubov Yegorova (URS), 1 (1) first place
