= 1991–92 FIS Cross-Country World Cup =

Cross-country skiing competition

Discipline	Men	Women
Overall	(Norway) Bjørn Dæhlie	(Commonwealth of Independent States) Yelena Välbe (3rd title)
Nations Cup	Norway	Russia
- Nations Cup Overall: Norway

Competition
Locations	8 venues	8 venues
Individual	12 events	12 events
Relay/Team	5 events	5 events

The 1991–92 FIS Cross-Country World Cup was the 11th official World Cup season in cross-country skiing for men and women. The World Cup started in Silver Star, Canada, from 8 December 1991 and finished in Vang, Norway, on 14 March 1992. Bjørn Dæhlie of Norway won the overall men's cup and Yelena Välbe of the CIS won the women's.

== Calendar ==
=== Men ===
C – Classic / F – Freestyle
No.	Date	Venue	Event	Winner	Second	Third	Ref.
1	7 December 1991	(Canada) Silver Star, BC	10 km C	(Norway) Vegard Ulvang	(Soviet Union) Vladimir Smirnov	(Norway) Terje Langli	
2	8 December 1991	(Canada) Silver Star, BC	25 km C	(Norway) Vegard Ulvang	(Norway) Bjørn Dæhlie	(Italy) Silvio Fauner	
3	14 December 1991	(Canada) Thunder Bay	30 km F	(Norway) Bjørn Dæhlie	(Norway) Vegard Ulvang	(Norway) Kristen Skjeldal	
4	4 January 1992	(Russia) Kavgolovo	30 km C	(Norway) Bjørn Dæhlie	(Norway) Vegard Ulvang	(Commonwealth of Independent States) Vladimir Smirnov	
5	11 January 1992	(Italy) Cogne	15 km F	(Norway) Bjørn Dæhlie	(Sweden) Torgny Mogren	(Norway) Sigurd Brørs	
1992 Winter Olympics (8–23 February)
6	10 February 1992	(France) Albertville	30 km C	(Norway) Vegard Ulvang	(Norway) Bjørn Dæhlie	(Norway) Terje Langli	
7	13 February 1992	(France) Albertville	10 km C	(Norway) Vegard Ulvang	(Italy) Marco Albarello	(Sweden) Christer Majbäck	
8	15 February 1992	(France) Albertville	15 km F Pursuit	(Norway) Bjørn Dæhlie	(Norway) Vegard Ulvang	(Italy) Giorgio Vanzetta	
9	22 February 1992	(France) Albertville	50 km F	(Norway) Bjørn Dæhlie	(Italy) Maurilio De Zolt	(Italy) Giorgio Vanzetta	
10	29 February 1992	(Finland) Lahti	15 km C	(Norway) Bjørn Dæhlie	(Norway) Vegard Ulvang	(Norway) Pål Gunnar Mikkelsplass	
11	7 March 1992	(Sweden) Funäsdalen	30 km F	(Sweden) Torgny Mogren	(Norway) Bjørn Dæhlie	(Commonwealth of Independent States) Vladimir Smirnov	
12	14 March 1992	(Norway) Vang	50 km C	(Norway) Vegard Ulvang	(Commonwealth of Independent States) Mikhail Botvinov	(Czechoslovakia) Lubos Buchta	

=== Women ===
C – Classic / F – Freestyle
No.	Date	Venue	Event	Winner	Second	Third	Ref.
1	7 December 1991	(Canada) Silver Star, BC	5 km C	(Soviet Union) Yelena Välbe	(Italy) Stefania Belmondo	(Soviet Union) Svetlana Nageykina	
2	8 December 1991	(Canada) Silver Star, BC	15 km C	(Italy) Stefania Belmondo	(Soviet Union) Yelena Välbe	(Soviet Union) Lyubov Yegorova	
3	14 December 1991	(Canada) Thunder Bay	5 km F	(Soviet Union) Yelena Välbe	(Soviet Union) Lyubov Yegorova	(Norway) Elin Nilsen	
4	4 January 1992	(Russia) Kavgolovo	15 km C	(Commonwealth of Independent States) Yelena Välbe	(Finland) Marjut Lukkarinen	(Finland) Marja-Liisa Kirvesniemi	
5	11 January 1992	(Italy) Cogne	30 km F	(Italy) Stefania Belmondo	(Norway) Elin Nilsen	(Norway) Trude Dybendahl	
1992 Winter Olympics (8–23 February)
6	9 February 1992	(France) Albertville	15 km C	(Commonwealth of Independent States) Lyubov Yegorova	(Finland) Marjut Lukkarinen	(Commonwealth of Independent States) Yelena Välbe	
7	13 February 1992	(France) Albertville	5 km C	(Finland) Marjut Lukkarinen	(Commonwealth of Independent States) Lyubov Yegorova	(Commonwealth of Independent States) Yelena Välbe	
8	15 February 1992	(France) Albertville	10 km F Pursuit	(Commonwealth of Independent States) Lyubov Yegorova	(Italy) Stefania Belmondo	(Commonwealth of Independent States) Yelena Välbe	
9	21 February 1992	(France) Albertville	30 km F	(Italy) Stefania Belmondo	(Commonwealth of Independent States) Lyubov Yegorova	(Commonwealth of Independent States) Yelena Välbe	
10	29 February 1992	(Finland) Lahti	30 km C	(Italy) Stefania Belmondo	(Norway) Inger Helene Nybråten	(Finland) Marjut Lukkarinen	
11	7 March 1992	(Sweden) Funäsdalen	5 km C	(Finland) Marja-Liisa Kirvesniemi	(Norway) Trude Dybendahl	(Commonwealth of Independent States) Lyubov Yegorova	
12	14 March 1992	(Norway) Vang	15 km F	(Commonwealth of Independent States) Yelena Välbe	(Commonwealth of Independent States) Lyubov Yegorova	(Italy) Stefania Belmondo	

Note: Until the 1994 Winter Olympics, Olympic races were part of the World Cup. Hence results from those races are included in the World Cup overall.

=== Men's team ===
C – Classic / F – Freestyle
WC	Date	Place	Discipline	Winner	Second	Third	Ref.
1	5 January 1992	(Russia) Kavgolovo	4 × 10 km relay C/F	Norway Terje Langli; Kristen Skjeldal; Vegard Ulvang; Bjørn Dæhlie	Finland I Mika Myllylä; Mika Kuusisto; Harri Kirvesniemi; Seppo Rantanen	CIS I Andrey Kirillov; Mikhail Devyatyarov; Alexei Prokourorov; Vladimir Smirnov	
2	12 January 1992	(Italy) Cogne	4 × 10 km relay C/F	Sweden I Jan Ottosson; Christer Majbäck; Henrik Forsberg; Torgny Mogren	Norway Gudmund Skjeldal; Pål Gunnar Mikkelsplass; Sigurd Brørs; Vegard Ulvang	Finland I Mika Myllylä; Harri Kirvesniemi; Jari Isometsä; Jari Räsänen	
3	15 February 1992	(France) Albertville	4 × 10 km relay C/F	Norway Terje Langli; Vegard Ulvang; Kristen Skjeldal; Bjørn Dæhlie	Italy Giuseppe Pulie; Marco Albarello; Giorgio Vanzetta; Silvio Fauner	Finland Mika Kuusisto; Harri Kirvesniemi; Jari Räsänen; Jari Isometsä	-
4	1 March 1992	(Finland) Lahti	4 × 10 km relay C/F	CIS Andrey Kirillov; Mikhail Botvinov; Alexey Prokurorov; Vladimir Smirnov	Norway I Terje Langli; Vegard Ulvang; Bjørn Dæhlie; Kristen Skjeldal	Finland I Mika Myllylä; Jukka Hartonen; Jari Räsänen; Jari Isometsä	
5	8 March 1992	(Sweden) Funäsdalen	4 × 10 km relay C	Norway I Sture Sivertsen; Terje Langli; Vegard Ulvang; Bjørn Dæhlie	CIS Andrey Kirillov; Mikhail Botvinov; Alexey Prokourorov; Vladimir Smirnov	Sweden I Jyrki Ponsiluoma; Jan Ottosson; Torgny Mogren; Henrik Forsberg	

=== Women's team ===
C – Classic / F – Freestyle
WC	Date	Place	Discipline	Winner	Second	Third	Ref.
1	5 January 1992	(Russia) Kavgolovo	4 × 5 km relay C/F	Finland Marja-Liisa Kirvesniemi; Pirkko Määttä; Tuulikki Pyykkönen; Marjut Lukkarinen	Norway Inger Helene Nybråten; Inger Lise Hegge; Solveig Pedersen; Trude Dybendahl	CIS I Svetlana Nageykina; Iryna Taranenko-Terelia; Lyubov Yegorova; Yelena Välbe	
2	12 January 1992	(Italy) Cogne	4 × 5 km relay C/F	Italy Bice Vanzetta; Gabriella Paruzzi; Manuela Di Centa; Stefania Belmondo	Finland Pirkko Määttä; Marja-Liisa Kirvesniemi; Jaana Savolainen; Marjut Lukkarinen	Norway Inger Helene Nybråten; Inger Lise Hegge; Kristin Tjelle; Elin Nilsen	
3	15 February 1992	(France) Albertville	4 × 5 km relay C/F	CIS Yelena Välbe; Raisa Smetanina; Larisa Lazutina; Lyubov Yegorova	Norway Solveig Pedersen; Inger Helene Nybråten; Trude Dybendahl; Elin Nilsen	Italy Bice Vanzetta; Manuela Di Centa; Gabriella Paruzzi; Stefania Belmondo	-
4	8 March 1992	(Sweden) Funäsdalen	4 × 5 km relay C	Norway I Solveig Pedersen; Inger Helene Nybråten; Elin Nilsen; Trude Dybendahl	CIS Yelena Välbe; Larisa Lazutina; Svetlana Nageykina; Lyubov Yegorova	Finland Sirpa Ryhänen; Marjut Lukkarinen; Jaana Savolainen; Marja-Liisa Kirvesniemi	
5	15 March 1992	(Norway) Vang	4 × 5 km relay C/F	CIS Svetlana Nageykina; Lyubov Yegorova; Larisa Lazutina; Yelena Välbe	Italy Bice Vanzetta; Manuela Di Centa; Gabriella Paruzzi; Stefania Belmondo	Norway I Inger Helene Nybråten; Inger Lise Hegge; Elin Nilsen; Trude Dybendahl	

== Overall standings ==
=== Men ===
Rank		Points
1	(Norway) Bjørn Dæhlie	198
2	(Norway) Vegard Ulvang	196
3	(Commonwealth of Independent States) Vladimir Smirnov	93
4	(Norway) Terje Langli	83
5	(Sweden) Torgny Mogren	73
6	(Commonwealth of Independent States) Mikhail Botvinov	51
7	(Finland) Harri Kirvesniemi	48
	(Norway) Kristen Skjeldal	48
9	(Sweden) Christer Majbäck	45
10	(Italy) Marco Albarello	42

=== Women ===
Rank		Points
1	(Commonwealth of Independent States) Yelena Välbe	169
2	(Italy) Stefania Belmondo	156
3	(Commonwealth of Independent States) Lyubov Yegorova	152
4	(Finland) Marjut Rolig	122
5	(Norway) Elin Nilsen	98
6	(Norway) Inger Helene Nybråten	96
7	(Norway) Trude Dybendahl	87
8	(Sweden) Marie-Helene Westin	56
9	(Italy) Manuela Di Centa	54
10	(Finland) Marja-Liisa Kirvesniemi	50

== Achievements ==
Victories in this World Cup (all-time number of victories as of 1991–92 season in parentheses)

Men

- Bjørn Dæhlie (NOR), 6 (11) first places
- Vegard Ulvang (NOR), 5 (8) first places
- Torgny Mogren (SWE), 1 (10) first place

Women

- Yelena Välbe (CIS), 4 (19) first places
- Stefania Belmondo (ITA), 4 (6) first place
- Lyubov Yegorova (CIS), 2 (3) first places
- Marja-Liisa Kirvesniemi (FIN), 1 (11) first place
- Marjut Rolig (FIN), 1 (1) first place
