= Sami Repo =

Finnish cross-country skier

Personal information
- Nationality: Finland
- Born: November 8, 1971 (age 54) Simpele, Finland

Sport
- Sport: Skiing
- Club: Joensuun Kataja

World Cup career
- Seasons: 13 – (1992–2004)
- Indiv. starts: 100
- Indiv. podiums: 3
- Indiv. wins: 0
- Team starts: 35
- Team podiums: 16
- Team wins: 7
- Overall titles: 0 – (15th in 1997)
- Discipline titles: 0
Medal record
Men's cross-country skiing
Representing Finland
Olympic Games
Bronze medal – third place	1998 Nagano	4 × 10 km relay
World Championships
Disqualified	2001 Lahti	4 × 10 km relay
Junior World Championships
Bronze medal – third place	1991 Reit im Winkl	10 km classical

Sami Repo (born 8 November 1971 in Simpele) is a Finnish former cross-country skier who competed from 1992 to 2004. He won a bronze medal in the 4 × 10 km relay at the 1998 Winter Olympics in Nagano. Repo's best individual finish also happened at Nagano with an 18th in the 10 km.

Repo's best finish at the Nordic skiing World Championships was 11th in the 10 km and the 10 km + 15 km combined pursuit events (both in 1999). He also won four FIS World Cup races in Finland as well (1993, 1995, 1997, 1998).

== Cross-country skiing results ==
All results are sourced from the International Ski Federation (FIS).

=== Olympic Games ===
- 1 medal – (1 bronze)

Year	Age	10 km	15 km	Pursuit	30 km	50 km	Sprint	4 × 10 km relay
1994	22	—	—N/a	—	—	37	—N/a	—
1998	26	18	—N/a	20	34	—	—N/a	Bronze
2002	30	—N/a	—	31	40	—	21	11

=== World Championships ===
Year	Age	10 km	15 km	Pursuit	30 km	50 km	Sprint	4 × 10 km relay
1995	23	—	—N/a	—	—	43	—N/a	—
1997	25	19	—N/a	13	—	—	—N/a	—
1999	27	62	—N/a	36	—	—	—N/a	5
2001	29	—N/a	11	11	—	—	—	DSQ
2003	31	—N/a	42	25	—	—	—	6

=== World Cup ===
==== Season standings ====
Season	Age					
Season	Age	Overall	Distance	Long Distance	Middle Distance	Sprint
1992	20	NC	—N/a	—N/a	—N/a	—N/a
1993	21	NC	—N/a	—N/a	—N/a	—N/a
1994	22	56	—N/a	—N/a	—N/a	—N/a
1995	23	36	—N/a	—N/a	—N/a	—N/a
1996	24	17	—N/a	—N/a	—N/a	—N/a
1997	25	15	—N/a	25	—N/a	9
1998	26	37	—N/a	32	—N/a	37
1999	27	30	—N/a	57	—N/a	28
2000	28	17	—N/a	34	12	24
2001	29	23	—N/a	—N/a	—N/a	—
2002	30	46	—N/a	—N/a	—N/a	74
2003	31	73	—N/a	—N/a	—N/a	—
2004	32	151	112	—N/a	—N/a	—

==== Individual podiums ====
- 3 podiums

No.	Season	Date	Location	Race	Level	Place
1	1995–96	26 November 1995	Vuokatti, Finland	10 km Individual Start C	World Cup	3rd
2	1998–99	28 November 1998	Muonio, Finland	10 km Individual Start C	World Cup	3rd
3	2000–01	29 November 2000	Beitostølen, Norway	10 km Individual Start F	World Cup	2nd

==== Team podiums ====
- 7 wins – (7 RL)
- 16 podiums – (15 RL, 1 TS)

No.	Season	Date	Location	Race	Level	Place	Teammate(s)
1	1992–93	5 March 1993	Lahti, Finland	4 × 10 km Relay C	World Cup	3rd	Kuusisto / Hauta-Aho / Alakärppä
2	1993–94	4 March 1994	Lahti, Finland	4 × 10 km Relay C	World Cup	1st	Kirvesniemi / Isometsä / Räsänen
3	1994–95	18 December 1994	Sappada, Italy	4 × 10 km Relay F	World Cup	2nd	Hartonen / Isometsä / Myllylä
4	1994–95	12 February 1995	Oslo, Norway	4 × 5 km Relay C/F	World Cup	1st	Hietamäki / Kirvesniemi / Kuusisto
5	1994–95	26 March 1995	Sapporo, Japan	4 × 10 km Relay C/F	World Cup	3rd	Kuusisto / Kirvesniemi / Isometsä
6	1995–96	10 December 1995	Davos, Switzerland	4 × 10 km Relay C	World Cup	1st	Hietamäki / Myllylä / Isometsä
7	1995–96	14 January 1996	Nové Město, Czech Republic	4 × 10 km Relay C	World Cup	1st	Myllylä / Kirvesniemi / Isometsä
8	1995–96	17 March 1996	Oslo, Norway	4 × 5 km Relay F	World Cup	3rd	Palolahti / Vuorenmaa / Isometsä
9	1996–97	24 November 1996	Kiruna, Sweden	4 × 10 km Relay C	World Cup	1st	Kirvesniemi / Myllylä / Isometsä
10	1996–97	8 December 1996	Davos, Switzerland	4 × 10 km Relay C	World Cup	1st	Isometsä / Kirvesniemi / Myllylä
11	1997–98	23 November 1997	Beitostølen, Norway	4 × 10 km Relay C	World Cup	2nd	Isometsä / Kirvesniemi / Taipale
12	1997–98	6 March 1998	Lahti, Finland	4 × 10 km Relay C/F	World Cup	1st	Kirvesniemi / Myllylä / Isometsä
13	1998–99	14 March 1999	Falun, Sweden	4 × 10 km Relay C/F	World Cup	2nd	Immonen / Kirvesniemi / Myllylä
14	1999–00	5 March 2000	Lahti, Finland	4 × 10 km Relay C/F	World Cup	2nd	Immonen / Kirvesniemi / Kattilakoski
15	2000–01	26 November 2000	Beitostølen, Norway	4 × 10 km Relay C/F	World Cup	2nd	Immonen / Kirvesniemi / Myllylä
16	2002–03	13 December 2002	Nové Město, Czech Republic	6 × 1.5 km Team Sprint F	World Cup	3rd	Kattilakoski
