= Karri Hietamäki =

Finnish cross-country skier

Personal information
- Nationality: Finland
- Born: 20 September 1969 (age 56) Isokyrö, Finland

Sport
- Sport: Skiing
- Club: Lapuan Virkiä

World Cup career
- Seasons: 17 – (1990–2006)
- Indiv. starts: 74
- Indiv. podiums: 0
- Team starts: 19
- Team podiums: 5
- Team wins: 3
- Overall titles: 0 – (35th in 1995)
- Discipline titles: 0
Medal record
Men's cross-country skiing
Representing Finland
World Championships
Silver medal – second place	1995 Thunder Bay	4 × 10 km relay
Jumior World Championships
Bronze medal – third place	1989 Vang	10 km

Karri Hietamäki (born 20 September 1969) is a Finnish cross-country skier who competed since 1992. He won a silver medal in the 4 × 10 km relay at the 1995 FIS Nordic World Ski Championships in Thunder Bay and earned his best individual finish of 14th at those same championships.

Hietamäki's best individual finish at the Winter Olympics was 31st in the 50 km event at Salt Lake City in 2002. He also earned two victories in Finland during his career (1994, 1997)

== Cross-country skiing results ==
All results are sourced from the International Ski Federation (FIS).

=== Olympic Games ===
Year	Age	10 km	15 km	Pursuit	30 km	50 km	Sprint	4 × 10 km relay
1994	24	—	—N/a	—	—	40	—N/a	—
2002	32	—N/a	43	—	—	31	—	11

=== World Championships ===
- 1 medal – (1 silver)

Year	Age	10 km	15 km	Pursuit	30 km	50 km	Sprint	4 × 10 km relay
1995	25	—	—N/a	—	14	—	—N/a	Silver
1997	27	—	—N/a	—	—	DNS	—N/a	—
1999	29	—	—N/a	—	—	DNF	—N/a	—
2003	33	—N/a	43	—	26	—	—	—

=== World Cup ===
==== Season standings ====
Season	Age					
Season	Age	Overall	Distance	Long Distance	Middle Distance	Sprint
1990	20	NC	—N/a	—N/a	—N/a	—N/a
1991	21	NC	—N/a	—N/a	—N/a	—N/a
1992	22	NC	—N/a	—N/a	—N/a	—N/a
1993	23	41	—N/a	—N/a	—N/a	—N/a
1994	24	58	—N/a	—N/a	—N/a	—N/a
1995	25	35	—N/a	—N/a	—N/a	—N/a
1996	26	40	—N/a	—N/a	—N/a	—N/a
1997	27	58	—N/a	35	—N/a	74
1998	28	82	—N/a	56	—N/a	—
1999	29	49	—N/a	NC	—N/a	46
2000	30	89	—N/a	45	NC	—
2001	31	121	—N/a	—N/a	—N/a	—
2002	32	118	—N/a	—N/a	—N/a	NC
2003	33	110	—N/a	—N/a	—N/a	NC
2004	34	128	89	—N/a	—N/a	—
2005	35	NC	NC	—N/a	—N/a	—
2006	36	NC	NC	—N/a	—N/a	—

==== Team podiums ====
- 3 victories
- 5 podiums

No.	Season	Date	Location	Race	Level	Place	Teammates
1	1993–94	4 March 1994	Lahti, Finland	4 × 10 km Relay C	World Cup	3rd	Taipale / Kuusisto / Heiskanen
2	1994–95	15 January 1995	Nové Město, Czech Republic	4 × 10 km Relay C	World Cup	1st	Isometsä / Kirvesniemi / Myllylä
3	1994–95	12 February 1995	Oslo, Norway	4 × 5 km Relay C/F	World Cup	1st	Kirvesniemi / Kuusisto / Repo
4	1994–95	17 March 1995	Thunder Bay, Canada	4 × 10 km Relay C/F	World Championships^{[1]}	2nd	Kirvesniemi / Räsänen / Isometsä
5	1995–96	10 December 1995	Davos, Switzerland	4 × 10 km Relay C	World Cup	1st	Repo / Myllylä / Isometsä

Note: ^{1} Until the 1999 World Championships, World Championship races were included in the World Cup scoring system.
