= Jukka Hartonen =

Finnish cross-country skier

Personal information
- Nationality: Finland
- Born: 14 March 1969 (age 57) Kiihtelysvaara, Finland

Sport
- Sport: Skiing
- Club: Finlandia-hiihto

World Cup career
- Seasons: 9 – (1990–1998)
- Indiv. starts: 40
- Indiv. podiums: 0
- Team starts: 8
- Team podiums: 3
- Team wins: 0
- Overall titles: 0 – (21st in 1994)
- Discipline titles: 0

Jukka Hartonen (born 14 March 1969 in Kiihtelysvaara) is a Finnish cross-country skier who competed from 1991 to 1998 and again from 2006 to present day. His best World Cup finish was fifth in a 15 km event at Lahti in 1995.

Hartonen also finished 13th in the 30 km event at the 1994 Winter Olympics in Lillehammer. His best finish at the FIS Nordic World Ski Championships was 14th in the 50 km event at Falun in 1993.

Hartonen is also active in triathlon and running races.

== Cross-country skiing results ==
All results are sourced from the International Ski Federation (FIS).

=== Olympic Games ===
Year	Age	10 km	Pursuit	30 km	50 km	4 × 10 km relay
1992	22	—	—	—	DNF	—
1994	24	—	—	13	—	—

=== World Championships ===
Year	Age	10 km	Pursuit	30 km	50 km	4 × 10 km relay
1993	23	—	—	—	14	—
1995	25	—	—	—	30	—
1997	27	—	—	28	—	—

=== World Cup ===
==== Season standings ====
Season	Age			
Season	Age	Overall	Long Distance	Sprint
1990	21	NC	—N/a	—N/a
1991	22	37	—N/a	—N/a
1992	23	34	—N/a	—N/a
1993	24	46	—N/a	—N/a
1994	25	21	—N/a	—N/a
1995	26	25	—N/a	—N/a
1996	27	55	—N/a	—N/a
1997	28	48	52	42
1998	29	105	71	—

==== Team podiums ====
- 3 podiums

No.	Season	Date	Location	Race	Level	Place	Teammate(s)
1	1991–92	28 February 1992	Lahti, Finland	4 × 10 km Relay F	World Cup	3rd	Myllylä / Räsänen / Isometsä
2	1994–95	18 December 1994	Sappada, Italy	4 × 10 km Relay F	World Cup	2nd	Repo / Isometsä / Myllylä
3	1994–95	5 February 1995	Falun, Sweden	4 × 10 km Relay F	World Cup	2nd	Räsänen / Isometsä / Myllylä
