= Gennady Lazutin =

Russian cross-country skier

Personal information
- Full name: Gennady Nikolayevich Lazutin
- Nationality: Russia
- Born: 31 March 1966 (age 60)

Sport
- Sport: Skiing

World Cup career
- Seasons: 7 – (1987–1989, 1991–1992, 1994–1995)
- Indiv. starts: 22
- Indiv. podiums: 0
- Team starts: 4
- Team podiums: 0
- Overall titles: 0 – (43rd in 1991)
Medal record
Men's cross-country skiing
Representing Soviet Union
Junior World Championships
Gold medal – first place	1984 Trondheim	3 × 5 km relay
Gold medal – first place	1985 Täsch	15 km
Gold medal – first place	1985 Täsch	3 × 5 km relay
Gold medal – first place	1986 Lake Placid	10 km
Gold medal – first place	1986 Lake Placid	30 km
Gold medal – first place	1986 Lake Placid	3 × 5 km relay

Gennady Nikolayevich Lazutin (Russian: Геннадий Николаевич Лазутин; born 31 March 1966) is a Soviet-born, Russian cross-country skier who competed from 1991 to 1995. His best World Cup finish was 12th in a 15 km event in the Soviet Union in 1991. Lazutin finished 15th in the 30 km event at the 1994 Winter Olympics in Lillehammer. He is married to cross-country skier Larisa Lazutina.

== Cross-country skiing results ==
All results are sourced from the International Ski Federation (FIS).

=== Olympic Games ===
Year	Age	10 km	Pursuit	30 km	50 km	4 × 10 km relay
1994	27	—	—	15	—	5

=== World Cup ===
==== Season standings ====
Season	Age	Overall
1987	20	NC
1988	21	NC
1989	22	NC
1991	24	43
1992	25	NC
1994	27	60
1995	28	58
