= Jari Isometsä =

Finnish cross-country skier (born 1968)

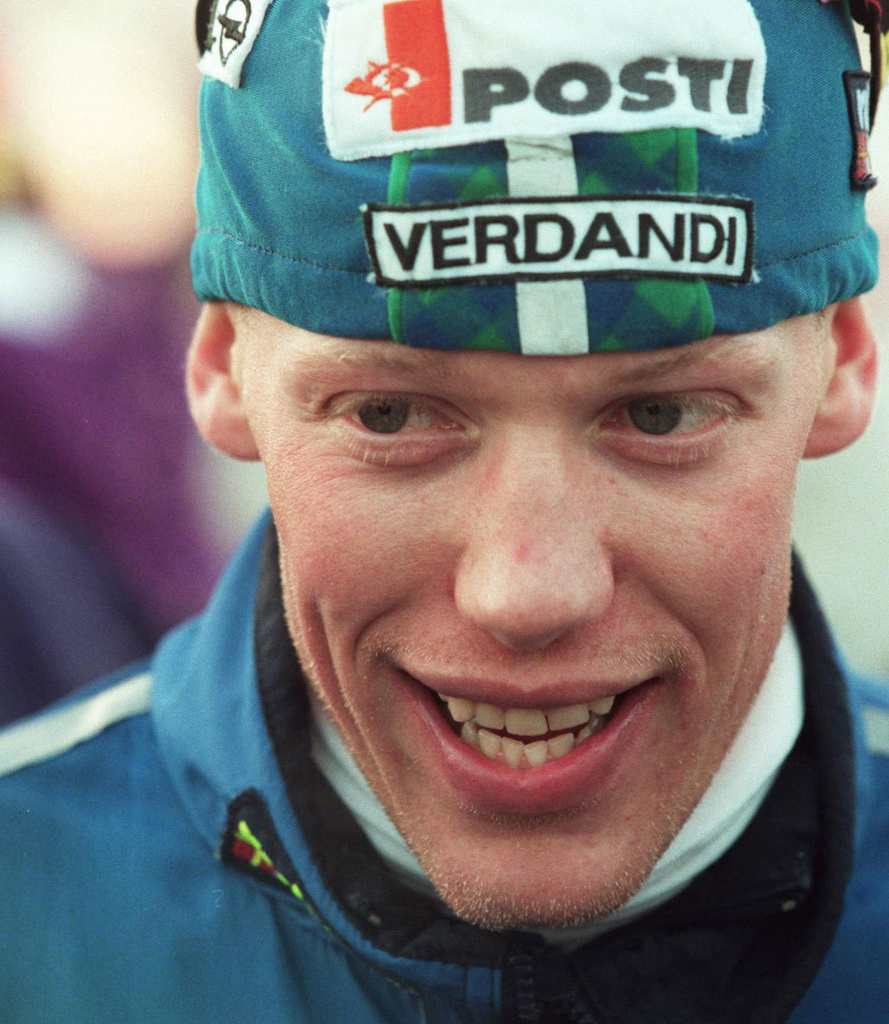

Personal information
- Full name: Jari Olavi Isometsä
- Nationality: Finland
- Born: 11 September 1968 (age 57) Tornio, Finland

Sport
- Sport: Skiing
- Club: Alatornion Pirkat

World Cup career
- Seasons: 15 – (1990, 1992–2001, 2003–2006)
- Indiv. starts: 131
- Indiv. podiums: 23
- Indiv. wins: 4
- Team starts: 39
- Team podiums: 21
- Team wins: 7
- Overall titles: 0 – (2nd in 2000)
- Discipline titles: 1 – (1 MD: 2000)
Medal record
Men's cross-country skiing
Representing Finland
Olympic Games
Bronze medal – third place	1992 Albertville	4 × 10 km relay
Bronze medal – third place	1994 Lillehammer	4 × 10 km relay
Bronze medal – third place	1998 Nagano	4 × 10 km relay
World Championships
Silver medal – second place	1995 Thunder Bay	4 × 10 km relay
Silver medal – second place	1997 Trondheim	4 × 10 km relay
Bronze medal – third place	1991 Val di Fiemme	4 × 10 km relay
Bronze medal – third place	1995 Thunder Bay	10 km + 15 km combined pursuit
Disqualified	2001 Lahti	10 km + 10 km combined pursuit

Jari Olavi Isometsä (born 11 September 1968) is a Finnish former cross-country skier who competed from 1990 to 2006. He won three bronze medals in the 4 × 10 km relay at the Winter Olympics (1992, 1994, 1998).

Isometsä also won four medals at the FIS Nordic World Ski Championships with two silvers (4 × 10 km: 1995, 1997) and two bronzes (4 × 10 km: 1991, 10 km + 15 km combined pursuit: 1995). In the World Cup, he took four victories in races between 10 km and 30 km.

Isometsä was among the six Finnish skiers who were caught of doping in the Finnish 2001 FIS Nordic World Ski Championships scandal for taking hydroxyethyl starch (HES), a blood plasma expander usually used to cover up the use of erythropoietin (EPO) in athletes. He was stripped of his silver medal in the 10 km + 10 km combined pursuit and served a two-year suspension from the FIS, IOC, and World Anti-Doping Agency (WADA), effectively ending his career as a world-class skier.

In 2013, Isometsä received a six-month suspended sentence after the Helsinki District Court found that he had committed perjury when witnessing to the court in 2011 that he was unaware of any doping use in the 1990s.

== Cross-country skiing results ==
All results are sourced from the International Ski Federation (FIS).

=== Olympic Games ===
- 3 medals – (3 bronze)

Year	Age	10 km	Pursuit	30 km	50 km	4 × 10 km relay
1992	23	16	12	—	22	Bronze
1994	25	23	DNS	6	—	Bronze
1998	29	15	8	4	—	Bronze

=== World Championships ===
- 4 medals – (2 silver, 2 bronze)

Year	Age	10 km	15 km	Pursuit	30 km	50 km	Sprint	4 × 10 km relay
1991	22	24	16	—N/a	—	—	—N/a	Bronze
1993	24	15	—N/a	13	—	DNF	—N/a	4
1995	26	8	—N/a	Bronze	9	11	—N/a	Silver
1997	28	14	—N/a	6	14	13	—N/a	Silver
1999	30	11	—N/a	4	—	14	—N/a	5
2001	32	—N/a	DSQ	DSQ	—	—	—	—

=== World Cup ===
==== Season standings ====
Season	Age					
Season	Age	Overall	Distance	Long Distance	Middle Distance	Sprint
1990	21	40	—N/a	—N/a	—N/a	—N/a
1992	23	22	—N/a	—N/a	—N/a	—N/a
1993	24	22	—N/a	—N/a	—N/a	—N/a
1994	25	3rd place, bronze medalist(s)	—N/a	—N/a	—N/a	—N/a
1995	26	5	—N/a	—N/a	—N/a	—N/a
1996	27	3rd place, bronze medalist(s)	—N/a	—N/a	—N/a	—N/a
1997	28	6	—N/a	16	—N/a	6
1998	29	5	—N/a	5	—N/a	9
1999	30	8	—N/a	15	—N/a	—
2000	31	2nd place, silver medalist(s)	—N/a	12	1st place, gold medalist(s)	53
2001	32	53	—N/a	—N/a	—N/a	—
2003	34	78	—N/a	—N/a	—N/a	—
2004	35	119	79	—N/a	—N/a	—
2005	36	NC	NC	—N/a	—N/a	—
2006	37	NC	NC	—N/a	—N/a	—

==== Individual podiums ====
- 4 victories
- 23 podiums

No.	Season	Date	Location	Race	Level	Place
1	1993–94	21 December 1993	Toblach, Italy	10 km Individual C	World Cup	2nd
2	1994–95	17 December 1994	Sappada, Italy	15 km Individual F	World Cup	3rd
3	1994–95	14 January 1995	Nové Město, Czech Republic	15 km Individual C	World Cup	2nd
4	1994–95	27 January 1995	Lahti, Finland	15 km Individual F	World Cup	3rd
5	1994–95	29 January 1995	Lahti, Finland	15 km Pursuit C	World Cup	2nd
6	1994–95	13 March 1995	Thunder Bay, Canada	15 km Pursuit F	World Championships^{[1]}	3rd
7	1995–96	29 November 1995	Gällivare, Sweden	15 km Individual F	World Cup	2nd
8	1995–96	17 December 1995	Santa Caterina, Italy	15 km Pursuit F	World Cup	2nd
9	1995–96	14 January 1996	Nové Město, Czech Republic	15 km Individual C	World Cup	2nd
10	1995–96	2 February 1996	Seefeld, Austria	10 km Individual F	World Cup	3rd
11	1995–96	3 March 1996	Lahti, Finland	30 km Individual F	World Cup	1st
12	1995–96	9 March 1996	Falun, Sweden	10 km Individual F	World Cup	3rd
13	1995–96	10 March 1996	Falun, Sweden	15 km Pursuit C	World Cup	3rd
14	1996–97	23 November 1996	Kiruna, Sweden	10 km Individual F	World Cup	2nd
15	1996–97	11 January 1997	Nagano, Japan	10 km Individual C	World Cup	3rd
16	1996–97	12 January 1997	Nagano, Japan	15 km Pursuit F	World Cup	3rd
17	1997–98	8 January 1998	Ramsau, Austria	15 km Individual C	World Cup	3rd
18	1998–99	13 December 1998	Toblach, Italy	15 km Pursuit C	World Cup	3rd
19	1998–99	14 February 1999	Seefeld, Austria	10 km Individual F	World Cup	3rd
20	1999–00	5 February 2000	Lillehammer, Norway	10 km + 10 km Skiathlon C/F	World Cup	1st
21	1999–00	16 February 2000	Ulrichen, Switzerland	10 km Individual F	World Cup	1st
22	1999–00	26 February 2000	Falun, Sweden	15 km Individual F	World Cup	2nd
23	1999–00	19 March 2000	Bormio, Italy	15 km Pursuit F	World Cup	1st

==== Team podiums ====
- 7 victories – (7 RL)
- 21 podiums – (19 RL, 2 TS)

No.	Season	Date	Location	Race	Level	Place	Teammate(s)
1	1990–91	15 February 1991	Val di Fiemme, Italy	4 × 10 km Relay C/F	World Championships^{[1]}	3rd	Kuusisto / Kirvesniemi / Räsänen
2	1991–92	18 February 1992	Albertville, France	4 × 10 km Relay C/F	Olympic Games^{[1]}	3rd	Kuusisto / Kirvesniemi / Räsänen
3	1991–92	28 February 1992	Lahti, Finland	4 × 10 km Relay F	World Cup	3rd	Myllylä / Hartonen / Räsänen
4	1993–94	22 February 1994	Lillehammer, Norway	4 × 10 km Relay C/F	Olympic Games^{[1]}	3rd	Myllylä / Kirvesniemi / Räsänen
5	1993–94	4 March 1994	Lahti, Finland	4 × 10 km Relay C	World Cup	1st	Repo / Kirvesniemi / Räsänen
6	1994–95	18 December 1994	Sappada, Italy	4 × 10 km Relay F	World Cup	2nd	Repo / Hartonen / Myllylä
7	1994–95	15 January 1995	Nové Město, Czech Republic	4 × 10 km Relay C	World Cup	1st	Hietamäki / Kirvesniemi / Myllylä
8	1994–95	5 February 1995	Falun, Sweden	4 × 10 km Relay F	World Cup	2nd	Räsänen / Hartonen / Myllylä
9	1994–95	17 March 1995	Thunder Bay, Canada	4 × 10 km Relay C/F	World Championships^{[1]}	2nd	Hietamäki / Kirvesniemi / Räsänen
10	1994–95	26 March 1995	Sapporo, Japan	4 × 10 km Relay C/F	World Cup	3rd	Kuusisto / Kirvesniemi / Repo
11	1995–96	10 December 1995	Davos, Switzerland	4 × 10 km Relay C	World Cup	1st	Hietamäki / Repo / Myllylä
12	1995–96	14 January 1996	Nové Město, Czech Republic	4 × 10 km Relay C	World Cup	1st	Repo / Myllylä / Kirvesniemi
13	1995–96	3 February 1996	Seefeld, Austria	12 × 1.5 km Team Sprint F	World Cup	3rd	Myllylä
14	1995–96	17 March 1996	Oslo, Norway	4 × 5 km Relay F	World Cup	3rd	Palolahti / Repo / Vuorenmaa
15	1996–97	24 November 1996	Kiruna, Sweden	4 × 10 km Relay C	World Cup	1st	Repo / Kirvesniemi / Myllylä
16	1996–97	8 December 1996	Davos, Switzerland	4 × 10 km Relay C	World Cup	1st	Repo / Kirvesniemi / Myllylä
17	1996–97	28 February 1997	Trondheim, Norway	4 × 10 km Relay C/F	World Championships^{[1]}	2nd	Kirvesniemi / Myllylä / Räsänen
18	1997–98	23 November 1997	Beitostølen, Norway	4 × 10 km Relay C	World Cup	2nd	Kirvesniemi / Repo / Taipale
19	1997–98	6 March 1998	Lahti, Finland	4 × 10 km Relay C/F	World Cup	1st	Kirvesniemi / Myllylä / Repo
20	1997–98	10 March 1998	Falun, Sweden	10 × 1.6 km Team Sprint F	World Cup	3rd	Palolahti
21	1999–00	19 December 1999	Davos, Switzerland	4 × 10 km Relay C	World Cup	2nd	Immonen / Myllylä / Kirvesniemi

Note: ^{1} Until the 1999 World Championships and the 1994 Olympics, World Championship and Olympic races were included in the World Cup scoring system.
