= Kirvesniemi =

Kirvesniemi is a Finnish surname. Notable people with the surname include:

- Harri Kirvesniemi (born 1958), Finnish cross-country skier
- Marja-Liisa Kirvesniemi (born 1955), Finnish cross-country skier
