= Jari Räsänen =

Finnish cross-country skier

Personal information
- Nationality: Finland
- Born: 28 January 1966 (age 60) Maaninka, Finland

Sport
- Sport: Skiing
- Club: Maaningan Mahti

World Cup career
- Seasons: 12 – (1986–1997)
- Indiv. starts: 50
- Indiv. podiums: 0
- Team starts: 14
- Team podiums: 10
- Team wins: 1
- Overall titles: 0 – (13th in 1994)
- Discipline titles: 0
Medal record
Men's cross-country skiing
Representing Finland
Olympic Games
| Bronze medal – third place | 1992 Albertville | 4 × 10 km relay |
| Bronze medal – third place | 1994 Lillehammer | 4 × 10 km relay |
World Championships
| Silver medal – second place | 1989 Lahti | 4 × 10 km relay |
| Silver medal – second place | 1995 Thunder Bay | 4 × 10 km relay |
| Silver medal – second place | 1997 Trondheim | 4 × 10 km relay |
| Bronze medal – third place | 1991 Val di Fiemme | 4 × 10 km relay |
Junior World Championships
| Bronze medal – third place | 1986 Lake Placid | 4 × 10 km relay |

Jari Räsänen (born 28 January 1966) is a Finnish former cross-country skier who competed from 1988 to 1998. He won two bronze medals in the 4 × 10 km relay at the Winter Olympics (1992, 1994).

Räsänen also won four 4 × 10 km relay medals at the FIS Nordic World Ski Championships with three silvers (1989, 1995, 1997) and a bronze (1991). He also won two FIS races at 10 km, one in 1994 and the other in 1995 (Both in Finland).

== Cross-country skiing results ==
All results are sourced from the International Ski Federation (FIS).

=== Olympic Games ===
- 2 medals – (2 bronze)

| Year | Age | 10 km | 15 km | Pursuit | 30 km | 50 km | 4 × 10 km relay |
|---|---|---|---|---|---|---|---|
| 1988 | 22 | —N/a | 30 | —N/a | — | — | 8 |
| 1992 | 26 | 15 | —N/a | 19 | — | 31 | Bronze |
| 1994 | 28 | 12 | —N/a | 6 | 11 | — | Bronze |

=== World Championships ===
- 4 medals – (3 silver, 1 bronze)

| Year | Age | 10 km | 15 km classical | 15 km freestyle | Pursuit | 30 km | 50 km | 4 × 10 km relay |
|---|---|---|---|---|---|---|---|---|
| 1989 | 23 | —N/a | — | 5 | —N/a | — | 13 | Silver |
| 1991 | 25 | — | —N/a | 12 | —N/a | 17 | 26 | Bronze |
| 1993 | 27 | 21 | —N/a | —N/a | 24 | 18 | DNF | 4 |
| 1995 | 29 | 27 | —N/a | —N/a | 17 | — | DNF | Silver |
| 1997 | 31 | — | —N/a | —N/a | — | 19 | — | Silver |

=== World Cup ===
==== Season standings ====
| Season | Age | | | |
| Season | Age | Overall | Long Distance | Sprint |
|---|---|---|---|---|
| 1986 | 20 | NC | —N/a | —N/a |
| 1987 | 21 | NC | —N/a | —N/a |
| 1988 | 22 | 53 | —N/a | —N/a |
| 1989 | 23 | 27 | —N/a | —N/a |
| 1990 | 24 | 22 | —N/a | —N/a |
| 1991 | 25 | 43 | —N/a | —N/a |
| 1992 | 26 | 44 | —N/a | —N/a |
| 1993 | 27 | 38 | —N/a | —N/a |
| 1994 | 28 | 13 | —N/a | —N/a |
| 1995 | 29 | 46 | —N/a | —N/a |
| 1996 | 30 | 74 | —N/a | —N/a |
| 1997 | 31 | 80 | NC | NC |

==== Team podiums ====
- 1 victory – (1 RL)
- 10 podiums – (9 RL, 1 TS)

| No. | Season | Date | Location | Race | Level | Place | Teammate(s) |
|---|---|---|---|---|---|---|---|
| 1 | 1988–89 | 24 February 1989 | Lahti, Finland | 4 × 10 km Relay C/F | World Championships^{[1]} | 2nd | Karvonen / Kirvesniemi / Ristanen |
| 2 | 1990–91 | 15 February 1991 | Val di Fiemme, Italy | 4 × 10 km Relay C/F | World Championships^{[1]} | 3rd | Kuusisto / Kirvesniemi / Isometsä |
| 3 | 1991–92 | 18 February 1992 | Albertville, France | 4 × 10 km Relay C/F | Olympic Games^{[1]} | 3rd | Kuusisto / Kirvesniemi / Isometsä |
| 4 | 1991–92 | 28 February 1992 | Lahti, Finland | 4 × 10 km Relay F | World Cup | 3rd | Myllylä / Hartonen / Isometsä |
| 5 | 1993–94 | 22 February 1994 | Lillehammer, Norway | 4 × 10 km Relay C/F | Olympic Games^{[1]} | 3rd | Myllylä / Kirvesniemi / Isometsä |
| 6 | 1993–94 | 4 March 1994 | Lahti, Finland | 4 × 10 km Relay C | World Cup | 1st | Repo / Kirvesniemi / Isometsä |
| 7 | 1994–95 | 5 February 1995 | Falun, Sweden | 4 × 10 km Relay F | World Cup | 2nd | Hartonen / Isometsä / Myllylä |
| 8 | 1994–95 | 17 March 1995 | Thunder Bay, Canada | 4 × 10 km Relay C/F | World Championships^{[1]} | 2nd | Hietamäki / Kirvesniemi / Isometsä |
| 9 | 1996–97 | 18 January 1997 | Lahti, Finland | 12 × 1.5 km Team Sprint F | World Cup | 2nd | Palolahti |
| 10 | 1996–97 | 28 February 1997 | Trondheim, Norway | 4 × 10 km Relay C/F | World Championships^{[1]} | 2nd | Kirvesniemi / Myllylä / Isometsä |

Note: ^{1} Until the 1999 World Championships and the 1994 Olympics, World Championship and Olympic races were included in the World Cup scoring system.
