= Hartonen =

Hartonen is a Finnish surname. Notable people with the surname include:

- Jukka Hartonen (born 1969), Finnish cross-country skier
- Tommi Hartonen (born 1977), Finnish sprinter

== Other uses ==
- Hartonen, a village in Kivennapa
