= Milla Saari =

Finnish cross-country skier

Helena Takalo
Personal information
- Full name: Milla Marika Saari
- Nationality: Finland
- Born: 28 October 1975 (age 50) Nivala, Finland

Sport
- Sport: Skiing
- Club: Nakkilan Vire

World Cup career
- Seasons: 12 – (1994–2001, 2004–2007)
- Indiv. starts: 51
- Indiv. podiums: 0
- Team starts: 19
- Team podiums: 2
- Team wins: 1
- Overall titles: 0 – (26th in 1999)
- Discipline titles: 0
Medal record
Women's cross-country skiing
Representing Finland
World Championships
Disqualified	2001 Lahti	4 × 5 km relay
Junior World Championships
Silver medal – second place	1994 Breitenwang	5 km classical
Bronze medal – third place	1995 Gällivare	4 × 5 km relay

Milla Saari (née Jauho; born 10 July 1975) is a Finnish former cross-country skier who competed from 1994 to 2007. She was best known for her doping role in the 2001 FIS Nordic World Ski Championships doping scandal that affected five other Finnish skiers for taking hydroxyethyl starch, a blood plasma expander. Saari, then Jauho, was part of the 4 × 5 km relay team that finished second, but would be disqualified for her blood doping and would receive a two-year suspension from the FIS as a result. She also finished sixth in the 15 km event at those same championships.

Saari competed at the 1998 Winter Olympics in Nagano where she finished 31st in the 15 km event and 50th in the 30 km event. She earned all four of her individual career victories up to 10 km after she served her two-year doping suspension from 2003 to 2005.

Saari retired after the 2006–07 World Cup season.

== Cross-country skiing results ==
All results are sourced from the International Ski Federation (FIS).

=== Olympic Games ===
Year	Age	5 km	15 km	Pursuit	30 km	4 × 5 km relay
1998	22	—	31	—	50	7

=== World Championships ===
Year	Age	5 km	10 km	15 km	Pursuit	30 km	Sprint	4 × 5 km relay	Team sprint
1999	23	20	—N/a	—	21	26	—N/a	11	—N/a
2001	25	—N/a	9	6	9	CNX^{[a]}	—	DSQ	—N/a
2007	31	—N/a	33	—N/a	—	—	—	—	—

a. ^{1} Cancelled due to extremely cold weather.

=== World Cup ===
==== Season standings ====
Season	Age	Discipline standings					Ski Tour standings
Season	Age	Overall	Distance	Long Distance	Middle Distance	Sprint	Tour de Ski
1994	18	NC	—N/a	—N/a	—N/a	—N/a	—N/a
1995	19	NC	—N/a	—N/a	—N/a	—N/a	—N/a
1996	20	59	—N/a	—N/a	—N/a	—N/a	—N/a
1997	21	70	—N/a	44	—N/a	—	—N/a
1998	22	49	—N/a	NC	—N/a	39	—N/a
1999	23	26	—N/a	32	—N/a	37	—N/a
2000	24	44	—N/a	31	33	—	—N/a
2001	25	27	—N/a	—N/a	—N/a	NC	—N/a
2004	28	NC	NC	—N/a	—N/a	NC	—N/a
2005	29	NC	NC	—N/a	—N/a	—	—N/a
2006	30	NC	NC	—N/a	—N/a	—	—N/a
2007	30	76	53	—N/a	—N/a	85	—

==== Team podiums ====
- 1 victory – (1 RL)
- 2 podiums – (2 RL)

No.	Season	Date	Location	Race	Level	Place	Teammates
1	2000–01	26 November 2000	Beitostølen, Norway	4 × 5 km Relay C/F	World Cup	1st	Manninen / Kuitunen / Varis
2	2000–01	9 December 2000	Santa Caterina, Italy	4 × 3 km Relay C/F	World Cup	3rd	Manninen / Salonen / Kuitunen

== See also ==
- List of sportspeople sanctioned for doping offences
