= Jürg Capol =

Swiss cross-country skier

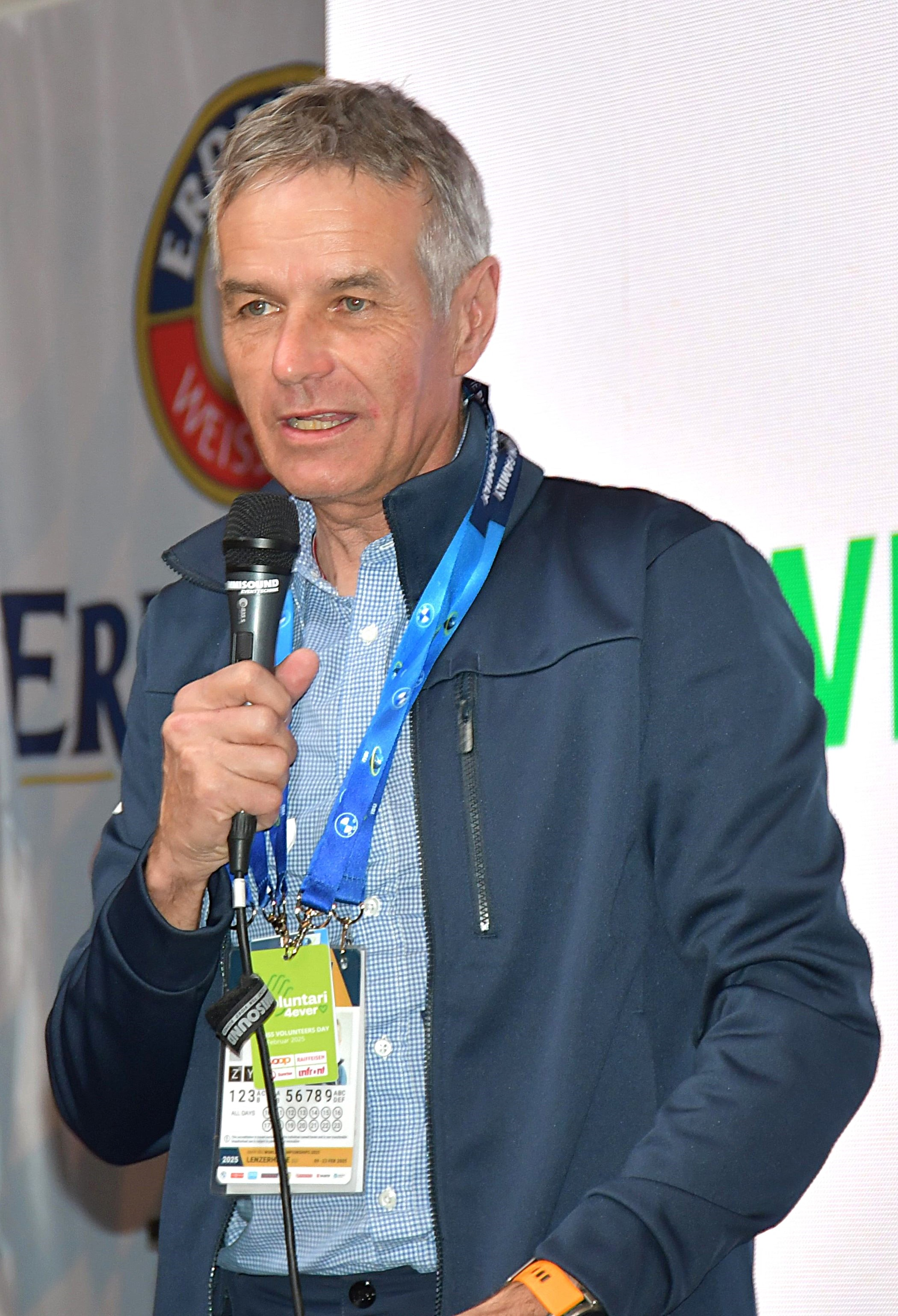
- Jürg Capol in 2025

Personal information
- Nationality: Switzerland
- Born: 2 July 1965 (age 61) Chur, Switzerland

Sport
- Sport: Skiing
- Club: SC Verrières

World Cup career
- Seasons: 1986, 1988–1990, 1992–1994
- Indiv. starts: 22
- Indiv. podiums: 0
- Team starts: 4
- Team podiums: 0
- Overall titles: 0 – (48th in 1988)
Medal record
Men's cross-country skiing
Representing Switzerland
Junior World Championships
Bronze medal – third place	1984 Trondheim	3 × 5 km relay

Jürg Capol (born 2 July 1965) is a Swiss cross-country skier who competed from 1988 to 1994 and is marketing director for the International Ski Federation (FIS) as of 2016. His best finish at the Winter Olympics was fourth in the 4 × 10 km relay at Calgary in 1988 while his best individual finish was 44th in the 50 km event at Lillehammer in 1994.

At the 1993 FIS Nordic World Ski Championships in Falun, Capol earned his best finish of 51st in the 10 km + 15 km combined pursuit event. His best World Cup finish was 13th in a 30 km event in the Soviet Union in 1988.

Capol was the FIS race director for cross-country skiing between 2007 and 2016, when he was promoted to marketing director for all FIS sports.

== Cross-country skiing results ==
All results are sourced from the International Ski Federation (FIS).

=== Olympic Games ===
Year	Age	10 km	15 km	Pursuit	30 km	50 km	4 × 10 km relay
1988	22	—N/a	22	—N/a	30	—	4
1994	28	—	—N/a	—	49	44	7

=== World Championships ===
Year	Age	10 km	15 km classical	15 km freestyle	Pursuit	30 km	50 km	4 × 10 km relay
1989	23	—N/a	43	—	—N/a	24	—	12
1993	27	62	—N/a	—N/a	51	—	—	9

=== World Cup ===
==== Season standings ====
Season	Age	Overall
1986	20	NC
1988	22	48
1989	23	NC
1990	24	54
1992	26	NC
1993	27	75
1994	28	NC
