= Ron Spanuth =

German cross-country skier (born 1980)

Personal information
- Nationality: Germany
- Born: 25 March 1980 (age 46) Ruhla, East Germany

Sport
- Sport: Skiing
- Club: TSC Ruhla

World Cup career
- Seasons: 2 – (2000–2001)
- Indiv. starts: 10
- Indiv. podiums: 0
- Team starts: 3
- Team podiums: 0
- Overall titles: 0 – (61st in 2001)
- Discipline titles: 0
Medal record
Men's cross-country skiing
Representing Germany
World Championships
Bronze medal – third place	2001 Lahti	4 × 10 km relay
Junior World Championships
Gold medal – first place	1999 Saalfelden	4 × 10 km relay
Gold medal – first place	2000 Štrbské Pleso	10 km freestyle

Ron Spanuth (born 25 March 1980) is a German cross-country skier who competed from 1997 to 2002. He won a bronze medal in the 4 × 10 km relay at the 2001 FIS Nordic World Ski Championships in Lahti and earned his best individual finish of 18th in the 50 km event at those same championships.

Spanuth won four races up to 15 km in his career in 1999 and 2000.

== Cross-country skiing results ==
All results are sourced from the International Ski Federation (FIS).

=== World Championships ===
- 1 medal – (1 bronze)

Year	Age	15 km	Pursuit	30 km	50 km	Sprint	4 × 10 km relay
2001	20	—	25	—	18	—	Bronze

=== World Cup ===
==== Season standings ====
Season	Age				
Season	Age	Overall	Long Distance	Middle Distance	Sprint
2000	20	NC	NC	NC	NC
2001	21	61	—N/a	—N/a	—
