= Janne Immonen =

Finnish cross-country skier

Personal information
- Nationality: Finland
- Born: 29 May 1968 (age 58) Sotkamo, Finland

Sport
- Sport: Skiing
- Club: Sotkamon Jymy

World Cup career
- Seasons: 4 – 1996, 1999–2001
- Indiv. starts: 19
- Indiv. podiums: 1
- Indiv. wins: 0
- Team starts: 11
- Team podiums: 4
- Team wins: 0
- Overall titles: 0 – (28th in 2000)
- Discipline titles: 0
Medal record
Men's cross-country skiing
Representing Finland
World Championships
Disqualified	2001 Lahti	4 × 10 km relay

Janne Immonen (born 29 May 1968) is a Finnish former cross-country skier who competed from 1993 to 2003. He was best known for his doping role in the 2001 FIS Nordic World Ski Championships doping scandal that would affect five other Finnish skiers for taking hydroxyethyl starch, a blood plasma expander. Immonen was part of the 4 × 10 km relay team that finished first, but would be disqualified for his blood doping and would receive a two-year suspension from the FIS as a result. He also finished 10th in the 30 km event at those same championships. In 2013, Immonen received a 6-month suspended sentence after the Helsinki District Court found that he had committed perjury when witnessing to the court in 2011 that he was unaware of any doping use in the 1990s.

Immonen's best individual career World Cup finish was third in Otepää in 2001.

== Cross-country skiing results ==
All results are sourced from the International Ski Federation (FIS).

=== World Championships ===
Year	Age	15 km	Pursuit	30 km	50 km	Sprint	4 × 10 km relay
2001	32	DNF	DNF	10	—	—	DSQ

=== World Cup ===
==== Season standings ====
Season	Age				
Season	Age	Overall	Long Distance	Middle Distance	Sprint
1996	27	NC	—N/a	—N/a	—N/a
1999	30	74	43	—N/a	—
2000	31	28	40	9	51
2001	32	50	—N/a	—N/a	—

==== Individual podiums ====
- 1 podium

No.	Season	Date	Location	Race	Level	Place
1	2000–01	10 February 2001	Otepää, Estonia	10 km Individual C	World Cup	3rd

==== Team podiums ====
- 4 podiums (4 RL)

No.	Season	Date	Location	Race	Level	Place	Teammates
1	1998–99	14 March 1999	Falun, Sweden	4 × 10 km Relay C/F	World Cup	2nd	Kirvesniemi / Myllylä / Repo
2	1999–00	19 December 1999	Davos, Switzerland	4 × 10 km Relay C	World Cup	3rd	Myllylä / Kirvesniemi / Isometsä
3	1999–00	5 March 2000	Lahti, Finland	4 × 10 km Relay C/F	World Cup	2nd	Kirvesniemi / Kattilakoski / Repo
4	2000–01	26 November 2000	Beitostølen, Norway	4 × 10 km Relay C/F	World Cup	2nd	Kirvesniemi / Myllylä / Repo

== See also ==
- List of sportspeople sanctioned for doping offences
