= Mika Myllylä =

Finnish cross-country skier

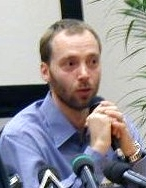
- Mika Myllylä in 2001

Personal information
- Full name: Mika Kristian Myllylä
- Nationality: Finland
- Born: 12 September 1969 Haapajärvi, Finland
- Died: 5 July 2011 (aged 41) Kokkola, Finland
- Height: 183 cm (6 ft 0 in)

Sport
- Sport: Skiing
- Club: Joutsan Pommi

World Cup career
- Seasons: 12 – (1990–2001)
- Indiv. starts: 94
- Indiv. podiums: 25
- Indiv. wins: 10
- Team starts: 22
- Team podiums: 15
- Team wins: 6
- Overall titles: 0 – (2nd in 1997)
- Discipline titles: 1 – (1 LD)
Medal record
Men's cross-country skiing
Representing Finland
International nordic ski competitions
Event	1st	2nd	3rd
Olympic Games	1	1	4
World Championships	4	3	2
Total	5	4	6
Olympic Games
Gold medal – first place	1998 Nagano	30 km classical
Silver medal – second place	1994 Lillehammer	50 km classical
Bronze medal – third place	1994 Lillehammer	30 km freestyle
Bronze medal – third place	1994 Lillehammer	4 × 10 km relay
Bronze medal – third place	1998 Nagano	10 km classical
Bronze medal – third place	1998 Nagano	4 × 10 km relay
World Championships
Gold medal – first place	1997 Trondheim	50 km classical
Gold medal – first place	1999 Ramsau	10 km classical
Gold medal – first place	1999 Ramsau	30 km freestyle
Gold medal – first place	1999 Ramsau	50 km classical
Silver medal – second place	1997 Trondheim	10 km + 15 km combined pursuit
Silver medal – second place	1997 Trondheim	4 × 10 km relay
Silver medal – second place	1999 Ramsau	10 km + 15 km combined pursuit
Bronze medal – third place	1995 Thunder Bay	10 km classical
Bronze medal – third place	1997 Trondheim	10 km classical
Disqualified	2001 Lahti	4 × 10 km relay

Mika Kristian Myllylä (12 September 1969 – 5 July 2011) was a Finnish cross-country skier who competed from 1992 to 2005. He won six medals at the Winter Olympics, earning one gold (1998: 30 km), one silver (1994: 50 km), and four bronzes (1994: 30 km, 4 × 10 km; 1998: 10 km, 4 × 10 km).

Myllylä also won a total of nine medals at the FIS Nordic World Ski Championships, winning four golds (1997: 50 km, 1999: 10 km, 30 km, 50 km), three silvers (10 km + 15 km combined pursuit: 1997, 1999; 4 × 10 km relay: 1997), and two bronzes (10 km: 1995, 1997).

He was on his way to become one of the greatest stars in cross-country skiing history, until he was caught doping in the Finnish 2001 FIS Nordic World Ski Championships scandal for taking hydroxyethyl starch (HES), a blood plasma expander usually used to cover up the use of erythropoietin (EPO) in athletes. The scandal also affected five other Finnish skiers, including Jari Isometsä and Harri Kirvesniemi. Myllylä received a two-year suspension from the FIS as a result. In connection with a 2011 court case, Myllylä gave a sworn statement where he admitted using EPO in the 1990s, during his career.

After the suspension Myllylä tried to return to skiing, but failed to come back to the international level despite winning a few Finnish championships. Myllylä retired from the skiing sports in 2005. In the following years he was involved in alcohol-related problems which were extensively covered in Finnish tabloid papers. On 5 July 2011, Myllylä was found dead at his home in Kokkola. The official police investigation concluded that his death was the result of an accident, and ruled out the possibility of foul play and suicide.

== Cross-country skiing results ==
All results are sourced from the International Ski Federation (FIS).

=== Olympic Games ===
- 6 medals – (1 gold, 1 silver, 4 bronze)

Year	Age	10 km	Pursuit	30 km	50 km	4 × 10 km relay
1992	22	14	20	34	—	—
1994	24	6	4	Bronze	Silver	Bronze
1998	28	Bronze	6	Gold	—	Bronze

=== World Championships ===
- 9 medals – (4 gold, 3 silver, 2 bronze)

Year	Age	10 km	15 km	Pursuit	30 km	50 km	Sprint	4 × 10 km relay
1991	21	39	—	—N/a	—	—	—N/a	—
1993	23	17	—N/a	18	23	DNF	—N/a	4
1995	25	Bronze	—N/a	4	4	—	—N/a	—
1997	27	Bronze	—N/a	Silver	10	Gold	—N/a	Silver
1999	29	Gold	—N/a	Silver	Gold	Gold	—N/a	5
2001	31	—N/a	DNS	DNF	—	—	—	DSQ

=== World Cup ===
==== Season titles ====
- 1 title – (1 Long Distance)

Season
Season	Discipline
1997	Long Distance

==== Season standings ====
Season	Age	Overall	Long Distance		Sprint
1990	20	—	—N/a		—N/a
1991	21	—	—N/a		—N/a
1992	22	32	—N/a		—N/a
1993	23	34	—N/a		—N/a
1994	24	4	—N/a		—N/a
1995	25	8	—N/a		—N/a
1996	26	14	—N/a		—N/a
1997	27	2nd place, silver medalist(s)	1st place, gold medalist(s)		7
1998	28	7	2nd place, silver medalist(s)		13
1999	29	3rd place, bronze medalist(s)	3rd place, bronze medalist(s)		8
2000	30	39	29^{[a]}	26^{[a]}	—
2001	31	33	—N/a		—

a. ^{1} 29th in the Long Distance World Cup.
^{2} 26th in the Middle Distance World Cup.

==== Individual podiums ====
- 10 victories
- 25 podiums

No.	Season	Date	Location	Race	Level	Place
1	1993–94	9 January 1994	Kavgalovo, Russia	15 km Individual C	World Cup	3rd
2	1993–94	15 January 1994	Oslo, Norway	10 km Individual F	World Cup	3rd
3	1993–94	14 February 1994	Lillehammer, Norway	30 km Individual F	Olympic Games^{[1]}	3rd
4	1993–94	27 February 1994	Lillehammer, Norway	50 km Individual C	Olympic Games^{[1]}	2nd
5	1993–94	12 March 1994	Falun, Sweden	30 km Individual C	World Cup	2nd
6	1994–95	11 March 1995	Thunder Bay, Canada	10 km Individual C	World Championships^{[1]}	3rd
7	1995–96	16 December 1995	Santa Caterina, Italy	10 km Individual C	World Cup	3rd
8	1995–96	13 January 1996	Nové Město, Czech Republic	15 km Individual C	World Cup	3rd
9	1996–97	7 December 1996	Davos, Switzerland	10 km Individual C	World Cup	1st
10	1996–97	4 January 1997	Kavgalovo, Russia	30 km Individual F	World Cup	1st
11	1996–97	19 January 1997	Lahti, Finland	30 km Individual C	World Cup	2nd
12	1996–97	24 February 1997	Trondheim, Norway	10 km Individual C	World Championships^{[1]}	3rd
13	1996–97	25 February 1997	Trondheim, Norway	10 km + 15 km Pursuit C/F	World Championships^{[1]}	2nd
14	1996–97	2 March 1997	Trondheim, Norway	50 km Individual C	World Championships^{[1]}	1st
15	1997–98	3 January 1998	Kavgalovo, Russia	30 km Individual F	World Cup	1st
16	1997–98	8 January 1998	Ramsau, Austria	15 km Individual C	World Cup	2nd
17	1998–99	5 January 1999	Otepää, Estonia	15 km Individual C	World Cup	2nd
18	1998–99	14 February 1999	Seefeld, Austria	10 km Individual F	World Cup	1st
19	1998–99	19 February 1999	Ramsau, Austria	30 km Individual F	World Championships^{[1]}	1st
20	1998–99	22 February 1999	Ramsau, Austria	10 km Individual C	World Championships^{[1]}	1st
21	1998–99	23 February 1999	Ramsau, Austria	10 km + 15 km Pursuit C/F	World Championships^{[1]}	2nd
22	1998–99	28 February 1999	Ramsau, Austria	50 km Individual C	World Championships^{[1]}	1st
23	1998–99	13 March 1999	Falun, Sweden	30 km Individual C	World Cup	3rd
24	1999–2000	2 February 2000	Trondheim, Norway	10 km Individual F	World Cup	1st
25	2000–01	20 December 2000	Davos, Switzerland	30 km Individual C	World Cup	1st

==== Team podiums ====
- 6 victories – (6 RL)
- 15 podiums – (14 RL, 1 TS)

No.	Season	Date	Location	Race	Level	Place	Teammate(s)
1	1991–92	28 February 1992	Lahti, Finland	4 × 10 km Relay F	World Cup	3rd	Hartonen / Räsänen / Isometsä
2	1993–94	22 February 1994	Lillehammer, Norway	4 × 10 km Relay C/F	Olympic Games^{[1]}	3rd	Kirvesniemi / Räsänen / Isometsä
3	1994–95	18 December 1994	Sappada, Italy	4 × 10 km Relay F	World Cup	2nd	Repo / Hartonen / Isometsä
4	1994–95	15 January 1995	Nové Město, Czech Republic	4 × 10 km Relay C	World Cup	1st	Hietamäki / Isometsä / Kirvesniemi
5	1994–95	5 February 1995	Falun, Sweden	4 × 10 km Relay F	World Cup	2nd	Räsänen / Hartonen / Isometsä
6	1995–96	10 December 1995	Davos, Switzerland	4 × 10 km Relay C	World Cup	1st	Hietamäki / Repo / Isometsä
7	1995–96	14 January 1996	Nové Město, Czech Republic	4 × 10 km Relay C	World Cup	1st	Repo / Kirvesniemi / Isometsä
8	1995–96	3 February 1996	Seefeld, Austria	12 × 1.5 km Team Sprint F	World Cup	3rd	Isometsä
9	1996–97	24 November 1996	Kiruna, Sweden	4 × 10 km Relay C	World Cup	1st	Repo / Kirvesniemi / Isometsä
10	1996–97	8 December 1996	Davos, Switzerland	4 × 10 km Relay C	World Cup	1st	Isometsä / Repo / Kirvesniemi
11	1996–97	28 February 1997	Trondheim, Norway	4 × 10 km Relay C/F	World Championships^{[1]}	2nd	Kirvesniemi / Räsänen / Isometsä
12	1997–98	6 March 1998	Lahti, Finland	4 × 10 km Relay C/F	World Cup	1st	Kirvesniemi / Repo / Isometsä
13	1998–99	14 March 1999	Falun, Sweden	4 × 10 km Relay C/F	World Cup	2nd	Immonen / Kirvesniemi / Repo
14	1999–00	19 December 1999	Davos, Switzerland	4 × 10 km Relay C	World Cup	2nd	Immonen / Kirvesniemi / Isometsä
15	2000–01	26 November 2000	Beitostølen, Norway	4 × 10 km Relay C/F	World Cup	2nd	Immonen / Kirvesniemi / Repo

Note: ^{1} Until the 1999 World Championships and the 1994 Olympics, World Championship and Olympic races were included in the World Cup scoring system.

==== Overall record ====
Result	Distance Races^{[a]}					Sprint	Individual Events	Team Events		All Events
Result	≤ 10 km^{[b]}	≤ 15 km^{[b]}	≤ 30 km^{[b]}	≥ 30 km^{[b]}	Pursuit	Sprint	Individual Events	Team Sprint	Relay^{[c]}	All Events
1st place	4	–	4	2	–	–	10	–	–	10
2nd place	–	2	2	1	2	–	7	–	1	8
3rd place	3	3	2	–	–	–	8	–	2	10
Podiums	7	5	8	3	2	–	25	–	3	28
Top 10	12	11	16	4	4	–	47	–	3	50
Points	23	23	23	6	6	–	81	–	4	85
Others	1	4	4	1	–	–	10	–	–	10
Starts	24	27	27	7	6	–	91	–	4	95

a. ^{1} Classification is made according to FIS classification.
b. ^{1} ^{2} ^{3} ^{4} Includes individual and mass start races.
c. ^{1} Incomplete due to lack of appropriate sources prior to 2001.

Note: Until 1999 World Championships and 1994 Olympics, World Championship and Olympic races are part of the World Cup. Hence results from those races are included in the World Cup overall record.

== See also ==
- List of sportspeople sanctioned for doping offences

== Sources ==
- Mika Myllylä at the International Ski and Snowboard Federation
- Mika Myllylä at Olympics at Sports-Reference.com (archived)
- Myllylä, Mika: Riisuttu mestari. Tammi. 2001.
