= Sergey Margatsky =

Kazakhstani cross-country skier (born 1965)

Personal information
- Nationality: Kazakhstani
- Born: 13 December 1965 (age 60)

Sport
- Sport: Cross-country skiing

Sergey Margatsky (Сергей Степанович Маргацкий, born 13 December 1965) is a Kazakhstani cross-country skier. He competed in the men's 50 kilometre classical event at the 1994 Winter Olympics.
