= Kuisma Taipale =

Finnish cross-country skier

Personal information
- Nationality: Finland
- Born: February 15, 1970 (age 56) Veteli, Finland

Sport
- Sport: Skiing
- Club: Vetelin Urheilijat

World Cup career
- Seasons: 17 – (1991–2007)
- Indiv. starts: 70
- Indiv. podiums: 0
- Team starts: 19
- Team podiums: 3
- Team wins: 0
- Overall titles: 0 – (56th in 1996)
- Discipline titles: 0

Kuisma Taipale (born 15 February 1970 in Veteli) is a Finnish cross-country skier. He represented Finland at the 2002 Winter Olympics in Salt Lake City, where he competed in the 15 km, the 50 km, and the relay.

He is the son of Hannu Taipale.

== Cross-country skiing results ==
All results are sourced from the International Ski Federation (FIS).

=== Olympic Games ===
Year	Age	15 km	Pursuit	30 km	50 km	Sprint	4 × 10 km relay
2002	32	30	—	—	47	—	11

=== World Championships ===
Year	Age	10 km	15 km	Pursuit	30 km	50 km	Sprint	4 × 10 km relay
1993	23	—	—N/a	—	16	—	—N/a	—
1999	29	—	—N/a	—	31	DNF	—N/a	—
2003	33	—N/a	—	26	33	—	—	6

=== World Cup ===
==== Season standings ====
Season	Age	Discipline standings					Ski Tour standings
Season	Age	Overall	Distance	Long Distance	Middle Distance	Sprint	Tour de Ski
1991	21	NC	—N/a	—N/a	—N/a	—N/a	—N/a
1992	22	NC	—N/a	—N/a	—N/a	—N/a	—N/a
1993	23	NC	—N/a	—N/a	—N/a	—N/a	—N/a
1994	24	72	—N/a	—N/a	—N/a	—N/a	—N/a
1995	25	NC	—N/a	—N/a	—N/a	—N/a	—N/a
1996	26	56	—N/a	—N/a	—N/a	—N/a	—N/a
1997	27	85	—N/a	61	—N/a	64	—N/a
1998	28	NC	—N/a	NC	—N/a	—	—N/a
1999	29	110	—N/a	NC	—N/a	—	—N/a
2000	30	110	—N/a	NC	63	—	—N/a
2001	31	NC	—N/a	—N/a	—N/a	—	—N/a
2002	32	112	—N/a	—N/a	—N/a	NC	—N/a
2003	33	89	—N/a	—N/a	—N/a	—	—N/a
2004	34	NC	NC	—N/a	—N/a	—	—N/a
2005	35	145	92	—N/a	—N/a	—	—N/a
2006	36	NC	NC	—N/a	—N/a	—	—N/a
2007	37	NC	NC	—N/a	—N/a	—	—

==== Team podiums ====
- 3 podiums

No.	Season	Date	Location	Race	Level	Place	Teammates
1	1993–94	4 March 1994	Lahti, Finland	4 × 10 km Relay C	World Cup	3rd	Kuusisto / Hietamäki / Heiskanen
2	1997–98	23 November 1997	Beitostølen, Norway	4 × 10 km Relay C	World Cup	2nd	Isometsä / Kirvesniemi / Repo
3	2002–03	1 December 2002	Kuusamo, Finland	2 × 5 km / 2 × 10 km Relay C/F	World Cup	2nd	Välimaa / Lassila / Jauhojärvi
