= Mika Kuusisto =

Finnish cross-country skier

Personal information
- Nationality: Finland
- Born: 13 December 1967 (age 58) Jurva, Finland

Sport
- Sport: Skiing
- Club: Ilmajoen Kisailijat

World Cup career
- Seasons: 11 – (1987, 1990–1999)
- Indiv. starts: 43
- Indiv. podiums: 0
- Team starts: 11
- Team podiums: 6
- Team wins: 1
- Overall titles: 0
- Discipline titles: 0
Medal record
Men's cross-country skiing
Representing Finland
Olympic Games
Bronze medal – third place	1992 Albertville	4 × 10 km relay
World Championships
Bronze medal – third place	1991 Val di Fiemme	4 × 10 km relay
Junior World Championships
Silver medal – second place	1987 Asiago	10 km
Bronze medal – third place	1986 Lake Placid	3 × 10 km relay

Mika Kuusisto (born 13 December 1967 in Jurva) is a Finnish former cross-country skier who competed during the 1990s. He won a bronze medal in the 4 × 10 km relay at the 1992 Winter Olympics in Albertville and also had his best individual Winter Olympics finish with a 23rd in the 50 km event in those same games.

Kuusisto also won a bronze in the 4 × 10 km relay at the 1991 Nordic skiing World Championships. He also won his only individual race at a 1997 event in Finland.

== Cross-country skiing results ==
All results are sourced from the International Ski Federation (FIS).

=== Olympic Games ===
- 1 medal – (1 bronze)

Year	Age	10 km	Pursuit	30 km	50 km	4 × 10 km relay
1992	24	—	—	26	23	Bronze

=== World Championships ===
- 1 medal – (1 bronze)

Year	Age	10 km	15 km	30 km	50 km	4 × 10 km relay
1991	23	19	—	24	—	Bronze

=== World Cup ===
==== Season standings ====
Season	Age			
Season	Age	Overall	Long Distance	Sprint
1987	19	NC	—N/a	—N/a
1990	22	NC	—N/a	—N/a
1991	23	NC	—N/a	—N/a
1992	24	NC	—N/a	—N/a
1993	25	NC	—N/a	—N/a
1994	26	NC	—N/a	—N/a
1995	27	NC	—N/a	—N/a
1996	28	NC	—N/a	—N/a
1997	29	NC	NC	—
1998	30	NC	NC	—
1999	31	NC	NC	—

==== Team podiums ====
- 1 victory – (1 RL)
- 6 podiums – (6 RL)

No.	Season	Date	Location	Race	Level	Place	Teammates
1	1990–91	15 February 1991	Val di Fiemme, Italy	4 × 10 km Relay C/F	World Championships^{[1]}	3rd	Kirvesniemi / Isometsä / Räsänen
2	1991–92	18 February 1992	Albertville, France	4 × 10 km Relay C/F	Olympic Games^{[1]}	3rd	Kirvesniemi / Räsänen / Isometsä
3	1992–93	5 March 1993	Lahti, Finland	4 × 10 km Relay C	World Cup	3rd	Hauta-Aho / Repo / Alakärppä
4	1993–94	4 March 1994	Lahti, Finland	4 × 10 km Relay C	World Cup	3rd	Taipale / Hietamäki / Heiskanen
5	1994–95	12 February 1995	Oslo, Norway	4 × 5 km Relay C/F	World Cup	1st	Hietamäki / Kirvesniemi / Repo
6	1994–95	26 March 1995	Sapporo, Japan	4 × 10 km Relay C/F	World Cup	3rd	Kirvesniemi / Repo / Isometsä

Note: ^{1} Until the 1999 World Championships and the 1994 Olympics, World Championship and Olympic races were included in the World Cup scoring system.
