= FIS Nordic World Ski Championships 2001 =

2001 ski competition in Lahti, Finland

- Official logo for the FIS Nordic World Ski Championships 2001.
- Host city: Lahti, Finland
- Events: 18
- Opening: 15 February 2001
- Closing: 25 February 2001
- Main venue: Salpausselkä
- Website: Lahti2001.fi

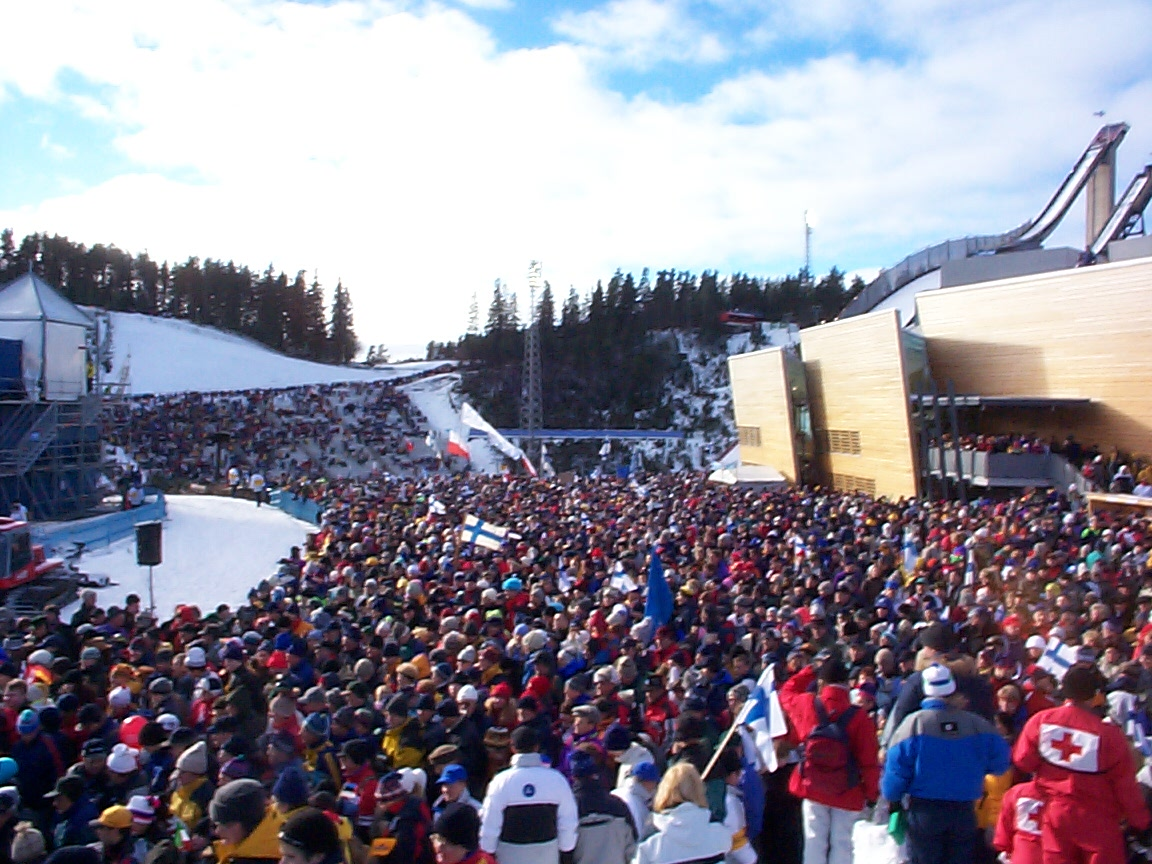
Audience at the venue

The FIS Nordic World Ski Championships 2001 took place February 15–25, 2001 in Lahti, Finland, for a record sixth time, previous events having been held in 1926, 1938, 1958, 1978 and 1989. These championships also saw the most event changes since the 1950s, with the 5 km women and 10 km men's events being discontinued, the 10 km women and 15 km men's events returning to their normal status for the first time since the 1991 championships, the debut of a combined pursuit as a separate category (5 km + 5 km for women, 10 km + 10 km for men), the addition of the individual sprint race for both genders, and the debut of the ski jumping team normal hill event. Extremely cold weather (−23 °C (−9 °F)) cancelled the women's 30 km event. The biggest controversy occurred when a doping scandal hit the host nation of Finland, resulting in six disqualifications. This would serve as a prelude to further doping cases in cross country skiing at the Winter Olympics in Salt Lake City the following year.

== Men's cross-country ==
=== 1 km individual sprint ===
February 21. 2001

Medal	Athlete	Time
Gold	Tor Arne Hetland (NOR)	3.14.1
Silver	Cristian Zorzi (ITA)	3.14.9
Bronze	Håvard Solbakken (NOR)	3.15.6

=== 15 km classical ===
February 15, 2001

Medal	Athlete	Time
Gold	Per Elofsson (SWE)	39:26.0
Silver	Mathias Fredriksson (SWE)	39:42.5
Bronze	Odd-Bjørn Hjelmeset (NOR)	39:49.3

Finnish skier Jari Isometsä finished fourth, but was disqualified for using plasma expanders.

=== 10 km + 10 km combined pursuit ===
February 17, 2001

Medal	Athlete	Time
Gold	Per Elofsson (SWE)	47:15.5
Silver	Johann Mühlegg (ESP)	47:42.0
Bronze	Vitaly Denisov (RUS)	47:49.5

Finland's Jari Isometsä finished second, but was disqualified for using of plasma expanders.

=== 30 km classical ===
February 19, 2001

Medal	Athlete	Time
Gold	Andrus Veerpalu (EST)	1:14:17.9
Silver	Frode Estil (NOR)	1:14:18.1
Bronze	Mikhail Ivanov (RUS)	1:14:49.1

=== 50 km freestyle ===
February 25, 2001

Medal	Athlete	Time
Gold	Johann Mühlegg (ESP)	2:05:27.2
Silver	René Sommerfeldt (GER)	2:07:23.4
Bronze	Sergey Kriyanin (RUS)	2:07:28.4

=== 4 × 10 km relay ===
February 22, 2001

Medal	Team	Time
Gold	Norway (Frode Estil, Odd-Bjørn Hjelmeset, Thomas Alsgaard, Tor Arne Hetland)	1:36:42.5
Silver	Sweden (Urban Lindgren, Mathias Fredriksson, Magnus Ingesson, Per Elofsson)	1:37:25.2
Bronze	Germany (Jens Filbrich, Andreas Schlütter, Ron Spanuth, René Sommerfeldt)	1:37:30.5

The Finnish team finished first, but was disqualified when Janne Immonen, Mika Myllylä and Harri Kirvesniemi tested positive for doping.

== Women's cross-country ==
=== 1 km individual sprint ===
February 21, 2001

Medal	Athlete	Time
Gold	Pirjo Manninen (FIN)	3.41.5
Silver	Kati Sundqvist (FIN)	3.43.1
Bronze	Yuliya Chepalova (RUS)	3.43.5

=== 10 km classical ===
February 20, 2001

Medal	Athlete	Time
Gold	Bente Skari (NOR)	26:55.5
Silver	Olga Danilova (RUS)	27:08.4
Bronze	Larisa Lazutina (RUS)	27:27.0

=== 5 km + 5 km combined pursuit ===
February 18, 2001

Medal	Athlete	Time
Gold	Virpi Kuitunen (FIN)	28:06.1
Silver	Larisa Lazutina (RUS)	28:08.9
Bronze	Olga Danilova (RUS)	28:09.3

=== 15 km classical ===
February 15, 2001

Medal	Athlete	Time
Gold	Bente Skari (NOR)	43:54.8
Silver	Olga Danilova (RUS)	44:02.5
Bronze	Kaisa Varis (FIN)	44:57.5

=== 4 × 5 km relay ===
February 23, 2001

Medal	Athlete	Time
Gold	Russia (Olga Danilova, Larisa Lazutina, Yuliya Chepalova, Nina Gavrylyuk)	53:01.6
Silver	Norway (Anita Moen, Bente Skari, Elin Nilsen, Hilde Gjermundshaug Pedersen)	54:01.9
Bronze	Italy (Gabriella Paruzzi, Sabina Valbusa, Stefania Belmondo, Cristina Paluselli)	54:23.3

The Finnish relay team finished second, but was disqualified when Milla Jauho and Virpi Kuitunen were tested positive for doping.

== Men's Nordic combined ==
=== 7.5 km sprint ===
February 24, 2001

Medal	Athlete	Time
Gold	Marco Baacke (GER)	19:45.3
Silver	Samppa Lajunen (FIN)	+ 6.2
Bronze	Ronny Ackermann (GER)	+ 9.7

=== 15 km Individual Gundersen ===
February 15, 2001

Medal	Athlete	Time
Gold	Bjarte Engen Vik (NOR)	39:26.7
Silver	Samppa Lajunen (FIN)	40:31.3
Bronze	Felix Gottwald (AUT)	40:37.0

Vik becomes the first repeat world champion in this event since Oddbjørn Hagen did it in 1934 and 1935.

=== 4 × 5 km team ===
February 20, 2001

Medal	Athlete	Time
Gold	Norway (Kenneth Bråten, Sverre Rotevatn, Bjarte Engen Vik, Kristian Hammer)	50:14.1
Silver	Austria (Christoph Eugen, Mario Stecher, David Kreiner, Felix Gottwald)	+ 10.9
Bronze	Finland (Jari Mantila, Hannu Manninen, Jaakko Tallus, Samppa Lajunen)	+ 29.4

== Men's ski jumping ==
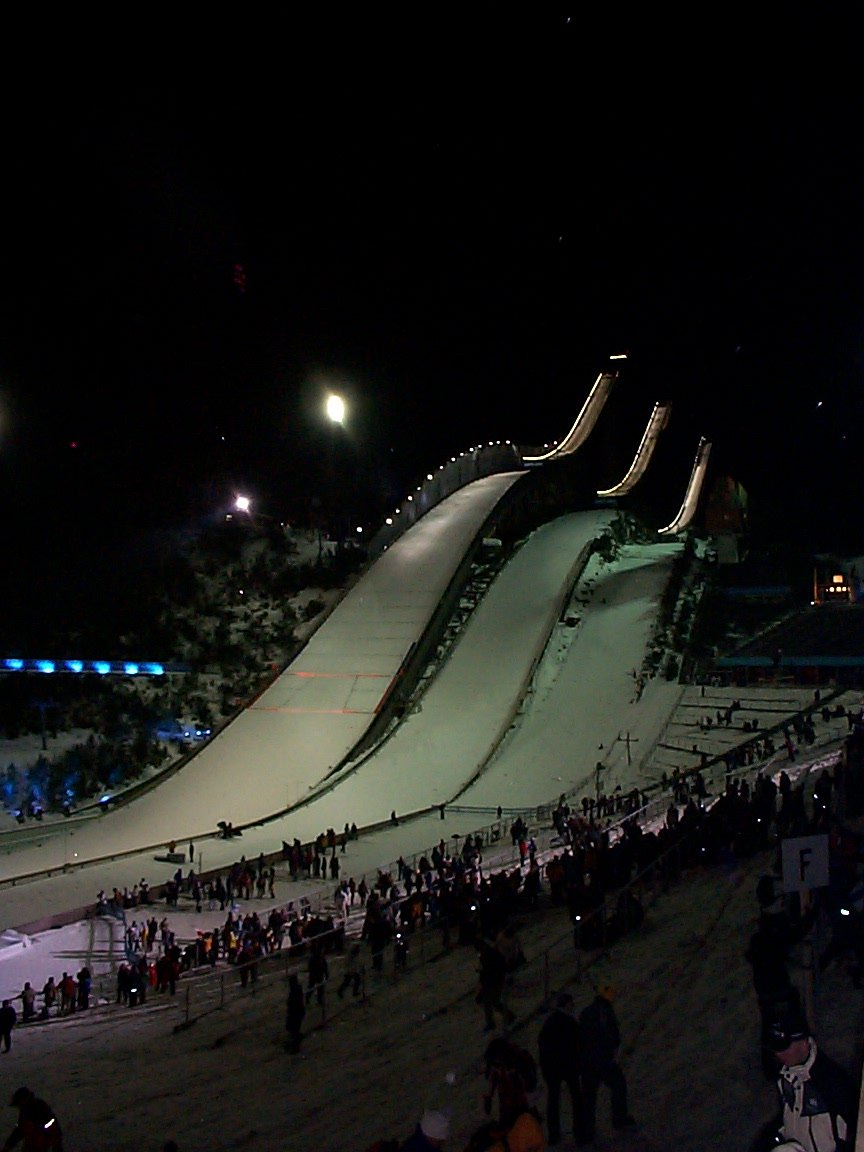
Ski jumping hills at FIS Nordic World Ski Championships 2001

=== Individual normal hill ===
February 23, 2001

Medal	Athlete	Points
Gold	Adam Małysz (POL)	246.0
Silver	Martin Schmitt (GER)	233.0
Bronze	Martin Höllwarth (AUT)	223.0

=== Individual large hill ===
February 19, 2001

Medal	Athlete	Points
Gold	Martin Schmitt (GER)	276.3
Silver	Adam Małysz (POL)	273.5
Bronze	Janne Ahonen (FIN)	267.4

=== Team normal hill ===
February 25, 2001

Medal	Team	Points
Gold	Austria (Wolfgang Loitzl, Andreas Goldberger, Stefan Horngacher, Martin Höllwarth)	953.5
Silver	Finland (Matti Hautamäki, Risto Jussilainen, Ville Kantee, Janne Ahonen)	951.5
Bronze	Germany (Sven Hannawald, Michael Uhrmann, Alexander Herr, Martin Schmitt)	911.5

=== Team large hill ===
February 21, 2001

Medal	Athlete	Points
Gold	Germany (Sven Hannawald, Michael Uhrmann, Alexander Herr, Martin Schmitt)	939.8
Silver	Finland (Risto Jussilainen, Jani Soininen, Ville Kantee, Janne Ahonen)	900.2
Bronze	Austria (Andreas Goldberger, Wolfgang Loitzl, Martin Höllwarth, Stefan Horngacher)	880.2

== Doping controversy ==
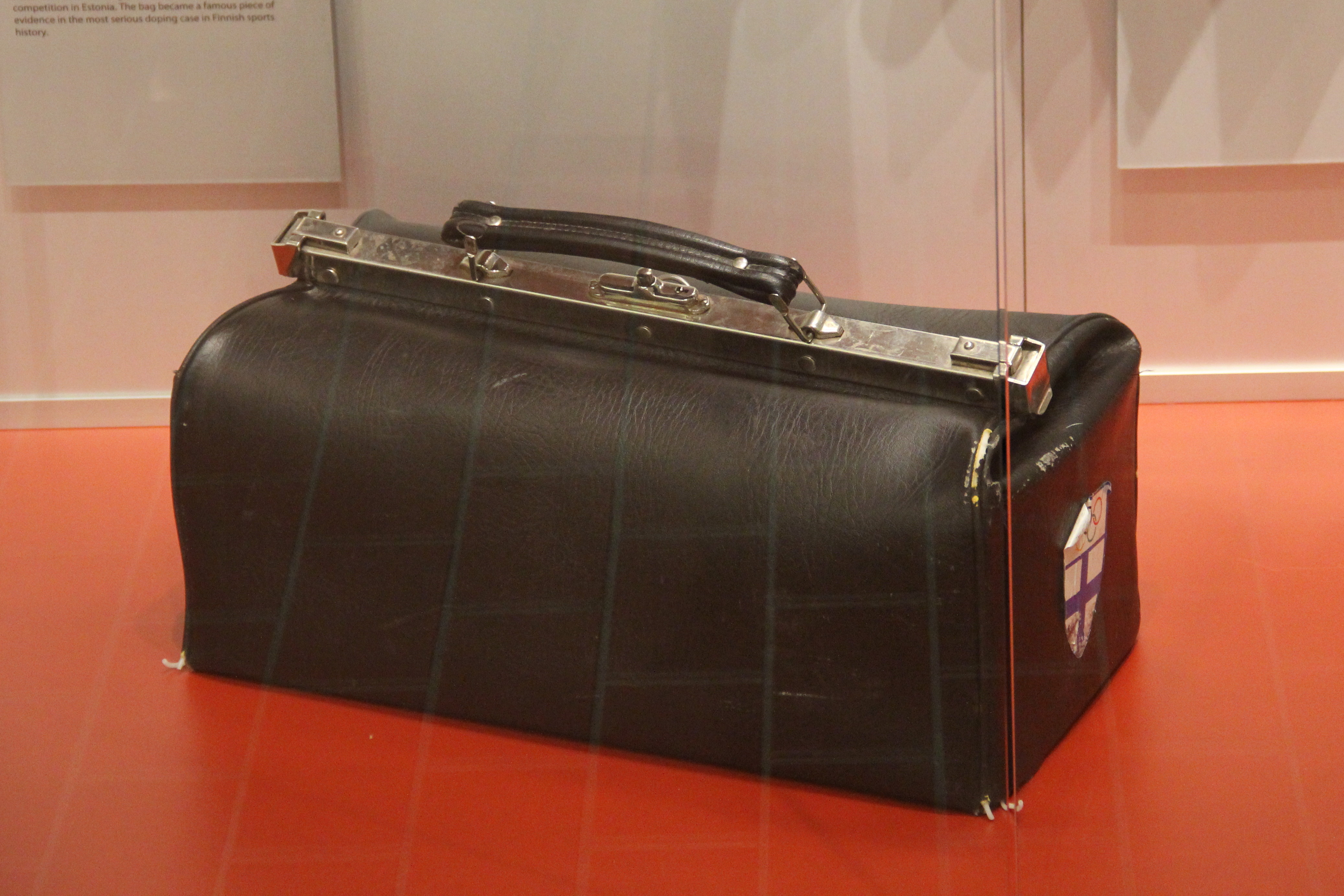
The same doctor's bag that belonged to the Finnish Ski Association, which was eventually found at the petrol station

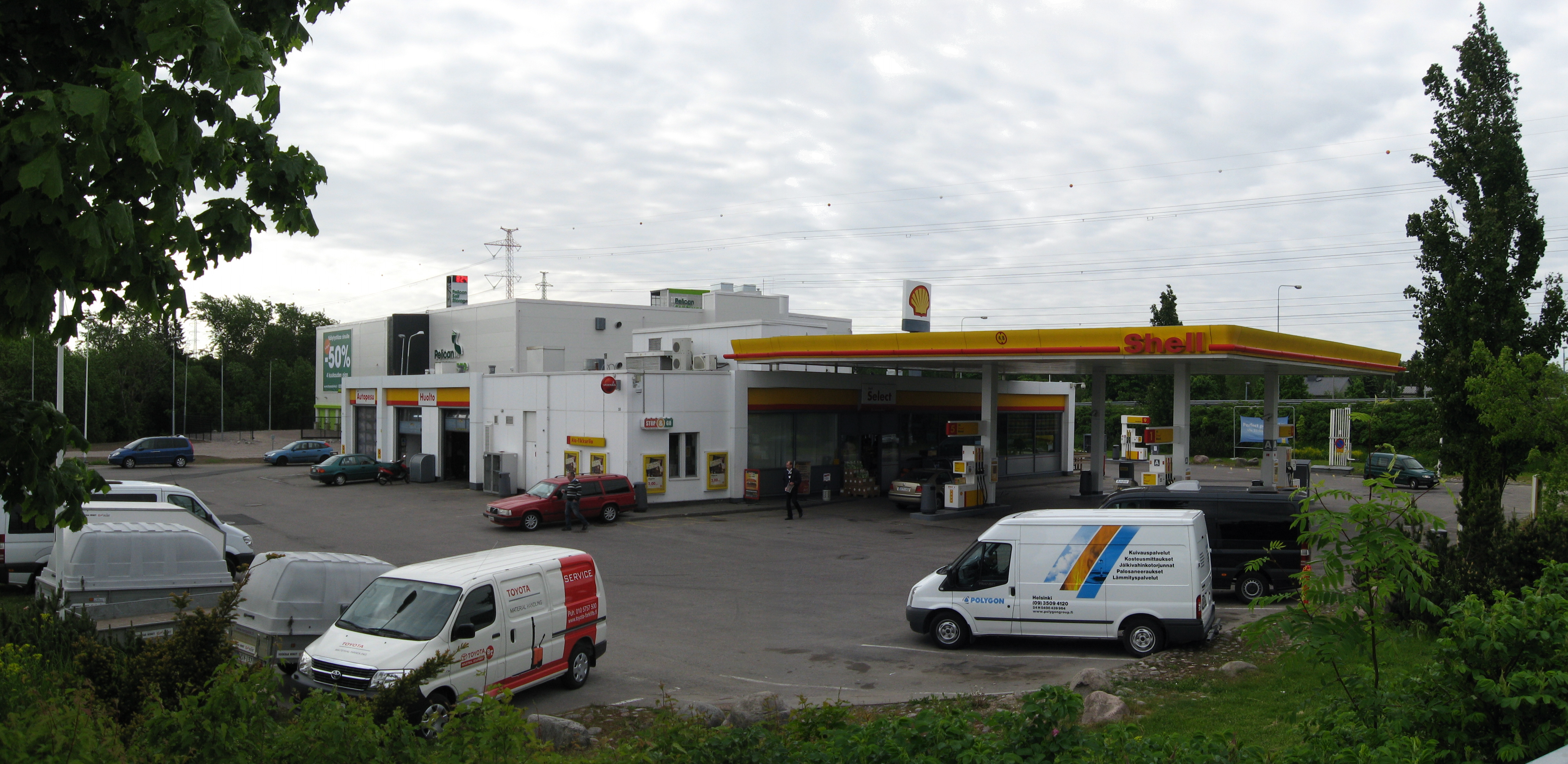
The same Shell Petrol station where the doctor's bag was found

The 2001 Doping Scandal in Lahti (fi) saw six Finnish cross-country skiers testing positive for doping, referred to as the "Lahti Six".

On 18 February, Jari Isometsä tested positive for use of hydroxyethyl starch (HES), a banned blood plasma expander. The test was carried out after the 15 km classical race, before the 10+10 km pursuit where Isometsä placed second. Isometsä admitted to using the HES product Hemohes and was immediately suspended.

The Finnish relay teams won gold in the men's race and silver in the women's race. However, it was revealed on 25 February, the last day of the championships, that Janne Immonen also had tested positive for using HES. This led to the disqualification of the men's relay team (Norway thus won the gold medal). After further testing, four more cross-country skiers provided positive doping tests: Harri Kirvesniemi and Mika Myllylä, Milla Jauho and Virpi Kuitunen. The Finnish women's relay team was thus also disqualified, although Kuitunen was allowed to retain her gold medal in the 5+5 km pursuit. Kirvesniemi retired while the others served two year suspensions. The revelations led to the resignation of the medical staff of the cross-country team, and also the team leadership such as head coach Kari-Pekka Kyrö.

Coinciding with the doping tests, Finnish newspaper Helsingin Sanomat revealed on 26 February that a woman had found a suspicious bag at a petrol station near Helsinki Airport. The bag contained several vials with what was later revealed to be HES-products and other products such as adrenaline and asthma medicines. The incident occurred after the last World Cup races before the championships, held in Otepää in Estonia only a week before the opening.

This incident, along with the doping disqualifications of Olga Danilova, Larisa Lazutina, and Johann Mühlegg at the 2002 Winter Olympics in Salt Lake City and Kaisa Varis at the FIS Nordic World Ski Championships 2003 in Val di Fiemme, would force the International Olympic Committee and the International Ski Federation to tighten up their drug testing procedures. Incidentally, all of these skiers took individual medals during the 2001 championships. Varis was also part of the disqualified Finnish women's relay team in 2001, although she retained an individual bronze medal.

Doping concerns were also strongly mentioned at the opening and closing ceremonies of the 2006 Winter Olympics in Turin.

== Medal table ==
Medal winners by nation.

* Host nation (Finland)

Rank	Nation	Gold	Silver	Bronze	Total
1	Norway (NOR)	6	2	2	10
2	Germany (GER)	3	2	3	8
3	Finland (FIN)*	2	5	3	10
4	Sweden (SWE)	2	2	0	4
5	Russia (RUS)	1	3	6	10
6	Austria (AUT)	1	1	3	5
7	Poland (POL)	1	1	0	2
7	Spain (ESP)	1	1	0	2
9	Estonia (EST)	1	0	0	1
10	Italy (ITA)	0	1	1	2
Totals (10 entries)		18	18	18	54
