= Cross-country skiing at the 1994 Winter Olympics – Men's 4 × 10 kilometre relay =

Men's 4 × 10 kilometre relay at the XVII Olympic Winter Games
- Pictogram for cross country
- Venue: Birkebeineren Ski Stadium
- Dates: 22 February 1994
- Competitors: 56 (14 teams) from 14 nations
- Winning time: 1:41:15.0

Medalists
1st place, gold medalist(s)		Maurilio De Zolt; Marco Albarello; Giorgio Vanzetta; Silvio Fauner	Italy
2nd place, silver medalist(s)		Sture Sivertsen; Vegard Ulvang; Thomas Alsgaard; Bjørn Dæhlie	Norway
3rd place, bronze medalist(s)		Mika Myllylä; Harri Kirvesniemi; Jari Räsänen; Jari Isometsä	Finland

The men's 4 × 10 km relay, a part of the cross-country skiing at the 1994 Winter Olympics, took place on 22 February at Birkebeineren Ski Stadium in Lillehammer, Norway. The race saw Italy beat Norway by 0.4 seconds on the finish line, with Finland finishing third. The three had followed each other closely through the first three rounds, but in the fourth heat, Silvio Fauner and Bjørn Dæhlie managed to break with Jari Isometsä. The event was the best attended of any in the games, with an estimated 100,000 spectators at the stadium and along the tracks. About 203,000 people applied for the 31,000 seats at the stadium, and some 75,000 ultimately watched from the track-side.

== Course ==
The event was held at Birkebeineren Ski Stadium in Lillehammer, Norway.

== Race ==
After the start at 10:30, Sture Sivertsen of Norway was the fastest and was in lead when leaving the stadium. After a few kilometers, Sture Sivertsen, Norway, Mika Myllylä of Finland, Jan Ottosson of Sweden and Maurilio De Zolt of Italy had broken away from the rest of the teams. Sivertsen was in lead for four kilometers, after which he let Mika Myllylä of Finland pull when the group was approaching the stadium. At half-distance through the stadium, Sivertsen and Myllylä had gained a small gap on the other two. Sivertsen regained the lead in the hill leading from the stadium, and was followed closely by Myllylä. By seven kilometers, de Zolt had fallen slightly behind, while Ottosson stiffened and was not able to keep up with the other three. At the first change, Sivertsen and Myllylä were even, while de Zolt was 12 seconds behind, while Ottosson was 57 seconds behind. About one minute after that, a group of Jeremias Wigger of Switzerland, Torald Rein of Germany, Nikolai Ivanov of Kazakhstan, Luboš Buchta of the Czech Republic and Andrey Kirillov of Russia.

The second stage became a race between Vegard Ulvang of Norway, Harri Kirvesniemi of Finland and Marco Albarello of Italy. Ulvang set off in a fast pace, with Kirvesniemi and Albarello following suit. Part of the way through the lap, Kirvesniemi attempted to pull, but the other two followed suit. Two kilometers before reaching the exchange, Kirvesniemi broke his ski pole, but was able to follow along. In the approach to the stadium, Ulvang looked like he would exchange first, but Albarello cut the corner and was able to exchange just before Ulvang. Behind the first three teams, Alexey Prokurorov of Russia was one and a half minute behind.

Norway's strategy was to pull away with Thomas Alsgaard in the third heat. However, he was not able to, and ended instead dragging Jari Räsänen of Finland and Giorgio Vanzetta of Italy. After six kilometers, Alsgaard attempted to pull away, but the pair behind him would not let him. This caused Alsgaard to stiffen, and he had difficulties following Vanzetta and Räsänen through the rest of the race. Behind the first three teams, Gennadiy Lazutin of Russia was two minutes behind.

The last lap started as a race between Silvio Fauner of Italy, Bjørn Dæhlie of Norway and Jari Isometsä of Finland. After a few kilometers, Dæhlie and Fauner were able to create a gap back to Isometsä, and the rest of the relay was a duel between the Norwegian and the Italian. For most of the race, Dæhlie was ahead. About two kilometers before the finish, both stopped, wanting the other to pull, and neither wanting to start the sprint. In the ascent towards the final straight stretch, Dæhlie lay right in the back of Fauner. 180 meters (590 ft) before the finish line, Dæhlie switched tracks, but was not able to keep up with Fauner, who finished 0.4 seconds before Dæhlie. Finland finished third, 1 minutes and 0.6 seconds behind Italy. Germany and Russia had a fight for the fourth place, with Johann Mühlegg of Germany finishing three seconds ahead of Mikhail Botvinov of Russia.

== Results ==
Rank	Bib	Country	Time	Deficit
1st place, gold medalist(s)	2	Italy; Maurilio De Zolt; Marco Albarello; Giorgio Vanzetta; Silvio Fauner	1:41:15.0	–
2nd place, silver medalist(s)	1	Norway; Sture Sivertsen; Vegard Ulvang; Thomas Alsgaard; Bjørn Dæhlie	1:41:15.4	+0.4
3rd place, bronze medalist(s)	4	Finland; Mika Myllylä; Harri Kirvesniemi; Jari Räsänen; Jari Isometsä	1:42:15.6	+1:00.6
4	5	Germany; Torald Rein; Jochen Behle; Peter Schlickenrieder; Johann Mühlegg	1:44:26.7	+3:11.7
5	3	Russia; Andrey Kirillov; Alexey Prokurorov; Gennadiy Lazutin; Mikhail Botvinov	1:44:29.2	+3:14.2
6	6	Sweden; Jan Ottosson; Christer Majbäck; Anders Bergström; Henrik Forsberg	1:45:22.7	+4:07.7
7	9	Switzerland; Jeremias Wigger; Hans Diethelm; Jürg Capol; Giachem Guidon	1:47:12.2	+5:57.2
8	8	Czech Republic; Luboš Buchta; Václav Korunka; Jiří Teplý; Pavel Benc	1:47:12.6	+5:57.6
9	13	Kazakhstan; Nikolay Ivanov; Pavel Korolyov; Andrey Nevzorov; Pavel Ryabinin	1:47:41.3	+6:26.3
10	10	France; Phillippe Sanchez; Patrick Rémy; Hervé Balland; Stéphane Azambre	1:48:25.1	+7:10.1
11	14	Estonia; Jaak Mae; Jaanus Teppan; Elmo Kassin; Taivo Kuus	1:48:57.6	+7:42.6
12	7	Belarus; Igor Obukhov; Victor Kamotski; Sergei Dolidovich; Viatcheslav Plaksunov	1:49:23.7	+8:08.7
13	12	United States; John Aalberg; Benjamin Husaby; Todd Boonstra; Luke Bodensteiner	1:49:40.5	+8:25.5
14	11	Japan; Hiroyuki Imai; Kazutoshi Nagahama; Kazunari Sasaki; Masaaki Kozu	1:49:42.1	+8:27.1
