= Harri Kirvesniemi =

Finnish cross-country skier (born 1958)

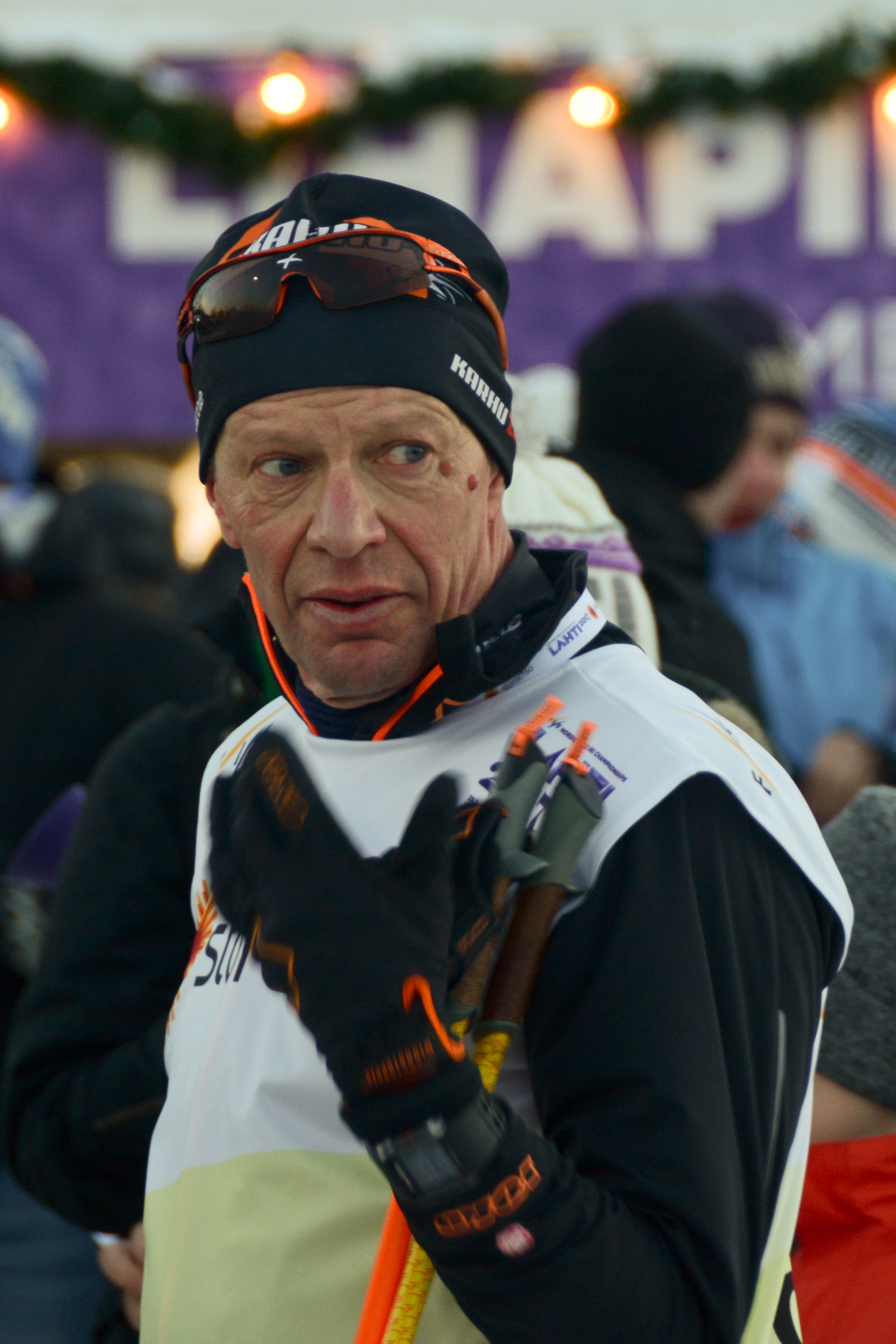
- Kirvesniemi in February 2017

Personal information
- Full name: Harri Tapani Kirvesniemi
- Nationality: Finland
- Born: 10 May 1958 (age 68) Mikkeli, Finland
- Spouse: Marja-Liisa Hämäläinen (m. 1984; div. 2011)

Sport
- Sport: Skiing
- Club: Mikkelin Hiihtaejaet

World Cup career
- Seasons: 20 – (1982–2001)
- Indiv. starts: 127
- Indiv. podiums: 16
- Indiv. wins: 6
- Team starts: 37
- Team podiums: 23
- Team wins: 7
- Overall titles: 0 – (3rd in 1982, 1984)
- Discipline titles: 0
Medal record
Men's cross-country skiing
Representing Finland
International nordic ski competitions
Event	1st	2nd	3rd
Olympic Games	0	0	6
World Championships	1	3	4
Total	1	3	10
Olympic Games
Bronze medal – third place	1980 Lake Placid	4 × 10 km relay
Bronze medal – third place	1984 Sarajevo	15 km
Bronze medal – third place	1984 Sarajevo	4 × 10 km relay
Bronze medal – third place	1992 Albertville	4 × 10 km relay
Bronze medal – third place	1994 Lillehammer	4 × 10 km relay
Bronze medal – third place	1998 Nagano	4 × 10 km relay
World Championships
Gold medal – first place	1989 Lahti	15 km classical
Silver medal – second place	1989 Lahti	4 × 10 km relay
Silver medal – second place	1995 Thunder Bay	4 × 10 km relay
Silver medal – second place	1997 Trondheim	4 × 10 km relay
Bronze medal – third place	1982 Oslo	15 km
Bronze medal – third place	1982 Oslo	4 × 10 km relay
Bronze medal – third place	1985 Seefeld	30 km
Bronze medal – third place	1991 Val di Fiemme	4 × 10 km relay
Disqualified	2001 Lahti	4 × 10 km relay

Harri Tapani Kirvesniemi (born 10 May 1958) is a Finnish former cross-country skier who competed from 1980 to 2001. During his career he won six Olympic medals (all bronzes), and also the 50 km event at the Holmenkollen ski festival in 2000. He retired after being caught doping at the 2001 World Championship in Lahti.

== Career ==
His biggest successes though were at the FIS Nordic World Ski Championships, where he earned a total of eight medals. This included one gold (15 km: 1989), three silvers (4 × 10 km relay: 1989, 1995. 1997), and four bronzes (15 km: 1982, 30 km: 1985, 4 × 10 km relay: 1982 (shared with East Germany), 1991). In 1998, he earned the Holmenkollen medal (shared with Fred Børre Lundberg, Larissa Lazutina, and Alexey Prokurorov). He was married to Marja-Liisa Kirvesniemi, who won the Holmenkollen medal in 1989. This makes them the third husband-wife team to ever win the Holmenkollen medal.

During the 2001 FIS Nordic World Ski Championships in Lahti, he tested positive for use of the banned plasma expander Hemohes together with five fellow Finnish cross-country skiers. This resulted in the disqualification of the gold-medal winning Finnish relay team. Following the scandal, Kirvesniemi retired from competitive skiing. In 2013, he received a 6-month suspended sentence after the Helsinki District Court found that he had committed perjury when witnessing to the court in 2011 that he was unaware of any doping use in the 1990s.

Presently Kirvesniemi works as the Plant Manager and Board Member at Yoko Ski.

== Cross-country skiing results ==
All results are sourced from the International Ski Federation (FIS).

=== Olympic Games ===
- 6 medals – (6 bronze)

Year	Age	10 km	15 km	Pursuit	30 km	50 km	4 × 10 km relay
1980	21	—N/a	8	—N/a	18	—	Bronze
1984	25	—N/a	Bronze	—N/a	7	4	Bronze
1988	29	—N/a	8	—N/a	9	22	8
1992	33	6	—N/a	11	10	—	Bronze
1994	35	9	—N/a	DNS	—	12	Bronze
1998	39	13	—N/a	DNS	6	—	Bronze

=== World Championships ===
- 8 medals – (1 gold, 3 silver, 4 bronze)

Year	Age	10 km	15 km classical	15 km freestyle	Pursuit	30 km	50 km	Sprint	4 × 10 km relay
1982	23	—N/a	Bronze	—N/a	—N/a	—	9	—N/a	Bronze
1985	26	—N/a	6	—N/a	—N/a	Bronze	7	—N/a	4
1987	28	—N/a	12	—N/a	—N/a	4	20	—N/a	6
1989	30	—N/a	Gold	—	—N/a	4	23	—N/a	Silver
1991	32	6	—N/a	—	—N/a	5	—	—N/a	Bronze
1993	34	18	—N/a	—N/a	DNS	10	—	—N/a	4
1995	36	5	—N/a	—N/a	7	6	—	—N/a	Silver
1997	38	8	—N/a	—N/a	DNS	—	DNF	—N/a	Silver
1999	40	13	—N/a	—N/a	DNS	—	13	—N/a	5
2001	42	—N/a	4	—N/a	—	8	—	—	DSQ

=== World Cup ===
==== Season standings ====
Season	Age				
Season	Age	Overall	Long Distance	Middle Distance	Sprint
1982	23	3rd place, bronze medalist(s)	—N/a	—N/a	—N/a
1983	24	14	—N/a	—N/a	—N/a
1984	25	3rd place, bronze medalist(s)	—N/a	—N/a	—N/a
1985	26	9	—N/a	—N/a	—N/a
1986	27	17	—N/a	—N/a	—N/a
1987	28	9	—N/a	—N/a	—N/a
1988	29	15	—N/a	—N/a	—N/a
1989	30	12	—N/a	—N/a	—N/a
1990	31	12	—N/a	—N/a	—N/a
1991	32	13	—N/a	—N/a	—N/a
1992	33	7	—N/a	—N/a	—N/a
1993	34	29	—N/a	—N/a	—N/a
1994	35	12	—N/a	—N/a	—N/a
1995	36	7	—N/a	—N/a	—N/a
1996	37	21	—N/a	—N/a	—N/a
1997	38	29	35	—N/a	26
1998	39	38	37	—N/a	36
1999	40	33	30	—N/a	61
2000	41	14	5	16	—
2001	42	57	—N/a	—N/a	—

==== Individual podiums ====
- 6 victories
- 16 podiums

No.	Season	Date	Location	Race	Level	Place
1	1981–82	23 February 1982	Oslo, Norway	15 km Individual	World Championships^{[1]}	3rd
2	1981–82	19 March 1982	Štrbské Pleso, Czechoslovakia	15 km Individual	World Cup	1st
3	1981–82	27 March 1982	Kastelruth, Italy	15 km Individual	World Cup	3rd
4	1983–84	10 December 1983	Reit im Winkl, West Germany	15 km Individual	World Cup	2nd
5	1983–84	13 February 1984	(Socialist Federal Republic of Yugoslavia) Sarajevo, Yugoslavia	15 km Individual	Olympic Games^{[1]}	3rd
6	1984–85	18 January 1985	Seefeld, Austria	30 km Individual	World Championships^{[1]}	3rd
7	1984–85	3 March 1985	Lahti, Finland	50 km Individual	World Cup	3rd
8	1986–87	10 January 1987	Canmore, Canada	15 km Individual C	World Cup	1st
9	1987–88	27 March 1988	Rovaniemi, Finland	50 km Individual C	World Cup	3rd
10	1988–89	22 February 1989	Lahti, Finland	15 km Individual C	World Championships^{[1]}	1st
11	1989–90	10 March 1990	Örnsköldsvik, Sweden	30 km Individual C	World Cup	2nd
12	1990–91	16 March 1991	Oslo, Norway	50 km Individual C	World Cup	2nd
13	1993–94	12 March 1994	Falun, Sweden	30 km Individual C	World Cup	1st
14	1994–95	14 January 1995	Nové Město, Czech Republic	15 km Individual C	World Cup	1st
15	1999–00	12 January 2000	Nové Město, Czech Republic	15 km Individual C	World Cup	3rd
16	1999–00	11 March 2000	Oslo, Norway	50 km Individual C	World Cup	1st

==== Team podiums ====
- 7 victories
- 23 podiums

No.	Season	Date	Location	Race	Level	Place	Teammate(s)
1	1981–82	25 February 1982	Oslo, Norway	4 × 10 km Relay	World Championships^{[1]}	3rd	Härkönen / Karvonen / Mieto
2	1983–84	16 February 1984	(Socialist Federal Republic of Yugoslavia) Sarajevo, Yugoslavia	4 × 10 km Relay	Olympic Games^{[1]}	3rd	Ristanen / Mieto / Karvonen
3	1985–86	9 March 1986	Falun, Sweden	4 × 10 km Relay F	World Cup	3rd	Hynninen / Ristanen / Karvonen
4	1986–87	19 March 1987	Oslo, Norway	4 × 10 km Relay C	World Cup	2nd	Laukkanen / Ristanen / Karvonen
5	1988–89	24 February 1989	Lahti, Finland	4 × 10 km Relay C/F	World Championships^{[1]}	2nd	Karvonen / Ristanen / Räsänen
6	1990–91	15 February 1991	Val di Fiemme, Italy	4 × 10 km Relay C/F	World Championships^{[1]}	3rd	Kuusisto / Isometsä / Räsänen
7	1991–92	18 February 1992	Albertville, France	4 × 10 km Relay C/F	Olympic Games^{[1]}	3rd	Kuusisto / Räsänen / Isometsä
8	1993–94	22 February 1994	Lillehammer, Norway	4 × 10 km Relay C/F	Olympic Games^{[1]}	3rd	Myllylä / Räsänen / Isometsä
9	1993–94	4 March 1994	Lahti, Finland	4 × 10 km Relay C	World Cup	1st	Repo / Isometsä / Räsänen
10	1994–95	15 January 1995	Nové Město, Czech Republic	4 × 10 km Relay C	World Cup	1st	Hietamäki / Isometsä / Myllylä
11	1994–95	12 February 1995	Oslo, Norway	4 × 5 km Relay C/F	World Cup	1st	Hietamäki / Kuusisto / Repo
12	1994–95	17 March 1995	Thunder Bay, Canada	4 × 10 km Relay C/F	World Championships^{[1]}	2nd	Hietamäki / Räsänen / Isometsä
13	1994–95	26 March 1995	Sapporo, Japan	4 × 10 km Relay C/F	World Cup	3rd	Kuusisto / Repo / Isometsä
14	1995–96	14 January 1996	Nové Město, Czech Republic	4 × 10 km Relay C	World Cup	1st	Repo / Myllylä / Isometsä
15	1996–97	24 November 1996	Kiruna, Sweden	4 × 10 km Relay C	World Cup	1st	Repo / Myllylä / Isometsä
16	1996–97	8 December 1996	Davos, Switzerland	4 × 10 km Relay C	World Cup	1st	Isometsä / Repo / Myllylä
17	1996–97	28 February 1997	Trondheim, Norway	4 × 10 km Relay C/F	World Championships^{[1]}	2nd	Myllylä / Räsänen / Isometsä
18	1997–98	23 November 1997	Beitostølen, Norway	4 × 10 km Relay C	World Cup	2nd	Isometsä / Repo / Taipale
19	1997–98	6 March 1998	Lahti, Finland	4 × 10 km Relay C/F	World Cup	1st	Myllylä / Repo / Isometsä
20	1998–99	14 March 1999	Falun, Sweden	4 × 10 km Relay C/F	World Cup	2nd	Immonen / Myllylä / Repo
21	1999–00	19 December 1999	Davos, Switzerland	4 × 10 km Relay C	World Cup	2nd	Immonen / Myllylä / Isometsä
22	1999–00	5 March 2000	Lahti, Finland	4 × 10 km Relay C/F	World Cup	2nd	Immonen / Kattilakoski / Repo
23	2000–01	26 November 2000	Beitostølen, Norway	4 × 10 km Relay C/F	World Cup	2nd	Immonen / Myllylä / Repo

Note: ^{1} Until the 1999 World Championships and the 1994 Olympics, World Championship and Olympic races were included in the World Cup scoring system.

== See also ==
- List of sportspeople sanctioned for doping offences
- List of athletes with the most appearances at Olympic Games
- List of multiple Olympic medalists in one event
