= Jaanus Teppan =

Estonian cross-country skier (born 1962)

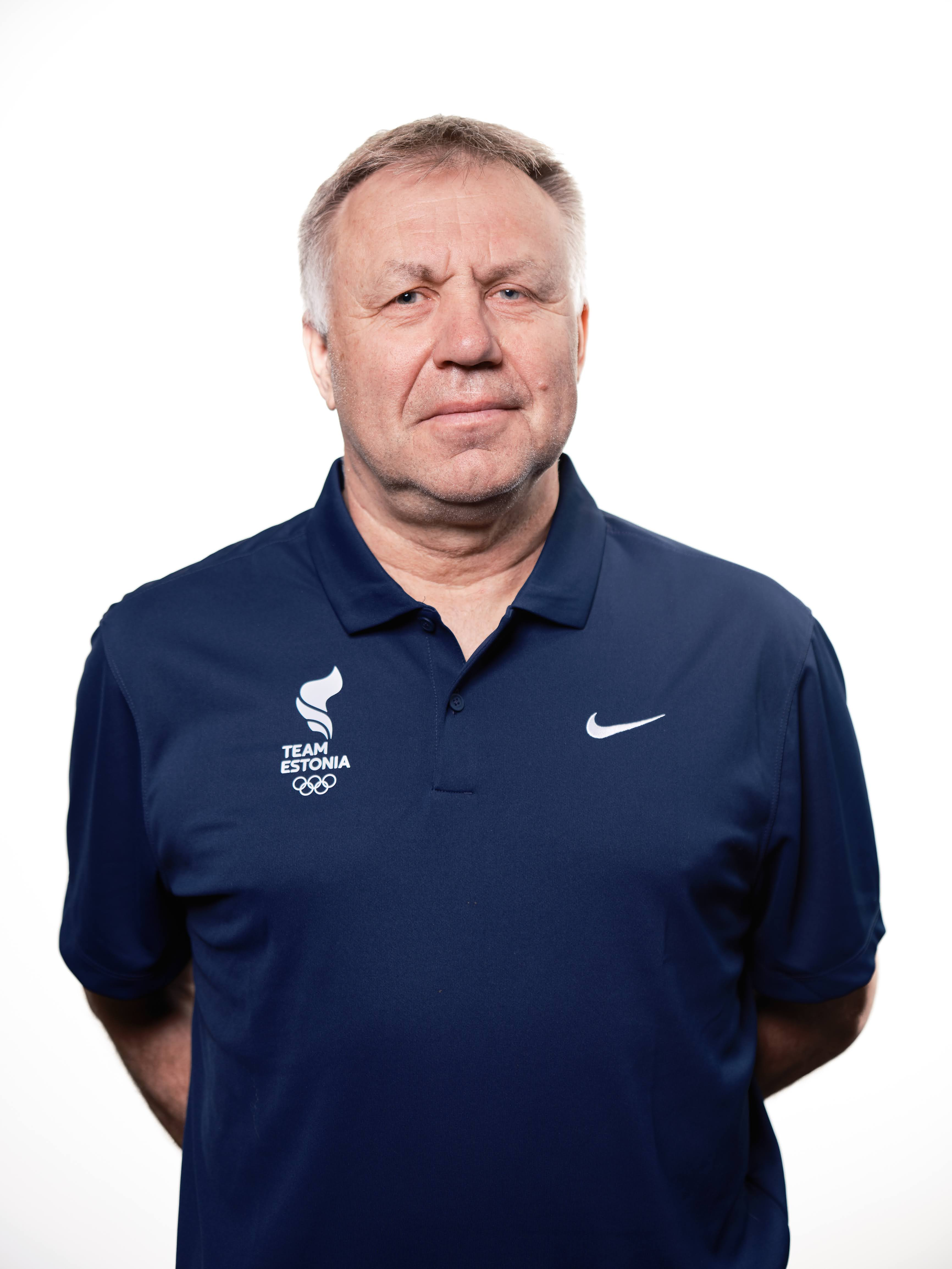
- Jaanus Teppan (2025)

Personal information
- Nationality: Estonian
- Born: 24 June 1962 (age 63) Tartu, then part of Estonian SSR, Soviet Union

Sport
- Sport: Cross-country skiing

Jaanus Teppan (born 24 June 1962) is an Estonian cross-country skier. He competed at the 1992 Winter Olympics and the 1994 Winter Olympics.

Teppan graduated from the University of Tartu in 1991 with a degree in physical education. From 2006 until 2009, he was the head coach of the Turkish cross-country skiing team, and from 2016 until 2018, he was the head coach of Estonian cross-country skiing team.
