= Nikolay Ivanov (skier) =

Kazakhstani cross-country skier (born 1971)

Personal information
- Born: 21 April 1971 (age 54) Kokchetav, Kazakh SSR, Soviet Union
- Height: 177 cm (5 ft 10 in)
- Weight: 77 kg (170 lb)

Sport
- Country: Kazakhstan
- Sport: Cross-country skiing

Nikolay Ivanov (Николай Геннадьевич Иванов, 21 April 1971 — 7 April 2024) is a Kazakhstani cross-country skier. He competed for Kazakhstan at the 1994 Winter Olympics in the men's 10 kilometre classical event.
