= Cross-country skiing at the 1994 Winter Olympics – Men's 50 kilometre classical =

Men's 50 kilometre classical at the XVII Olympic Winter Games
- Venue: Birkebeineren Ski Stadium
- Dates: 27 February 1994
- Competitors: 66 from 25 nations
- Winning time: 2:07:20.3

Medalists
| 1st place, gold medalist(s) | | Vladimir Smirnov; Kazakhstan |
| 2nd place, silver medalist(s) | | Mika Myllylä; Finland |
| 3rd place, bronze medalist(s) | | Sture Sivertsen; Norway |

The men's 50 kilometre classical cross-country skiing competition at the 1994 Winter Olympics in Lillehammer, Norway, was held on 27 February at Birkebeineren Ski Stadium in Lillehammer.

Each skier started at half a minute intervals, skiing the entire 50 kilometre course. The Swede Torgny Mogren was the 1993 World champion and Bjørn Dæhlie was the defending olympic champion from 1992 Olympics in Albertville, France.

== Results ==
| Rank | Bib | Name | Country | Time | Deficit |
|---|---|---|---|---|---|
| 1st place, gold medalist(s) | 59 | Vladimir Smirnov | Kazakhstan | 2:07:20.3 | – |
| 2nd place, silver medalist(s) | 61 | Mika Myllylä | Finland | 2:08:41.9 | +1:21.6 |
| 3rd place, bronze medalist(s) | 72 | Sture Sivertsen | Norway | 2:08:49.0 | +1:28.7 |
| 4 | 66 | Bjørn Dæhlie | Norway | 2:09:11.4 | +1:51.1 |
| 5 | 60 | Erling Jevne | Norway | 2:09:12.2 | +1:51.9 |
| 6 | 47 | Christer Majbäck | Sweden | 2:10:03.8 | +2:43.5 |
| 7 | 58 | Maurilio De Zolt | Italy | 2:10:12.1 | +2:51.8 |
| 8 | 62 | Giorgio Vanzetta | Italy | 2:10:16.4 | +2:56.1 |
| 9 | 69 | Mikhail Botvinov | Russia | 2:10:18.9 | +2:58.6 |
| 10 | 63 | Vegard Ulvang | Norway | 2:10:40.0 | +3:19.7 |
| 11 | 56 | Silvio Fauner | Italy | 2:11:09.6 | +3:49.3 |
| 12 | 67 | Harri Kirvesniemi | Finland | 2:11:19.3 | +3:59.0 |
| 13 | 64 | Alexey Prokourorov | Russia | 2:11:52.8 | +4:32.5 |
| 14 | 65 | Igor Badamshin | Russia | 2:12:20.1 | +4:59.8 |
| 15 | 34 | Alois Stadlober | Austria | 2:13:13.5 | +5:53.2 |
| 16 | 51 | Jeremias Wigger | Switzerland | 2:13:40.2 | +6:19.9 |
| 17 | 52 | Alexander Vorobyov | Russia | 2:13:44.5 | +6:24.2 |
| 18 | 71 | Jan Ottosson | Sweden | 2:13:55.2 | +6:34.9 |
| 19 | 37 | Juan Jesús Gutiérrez | Spain | 2:14:22.5 | +7:02.2 |
| 20 | 36 | Luboš Buchta | Czech Republic | 2:14:50.0 | +7:29.7 |
| 21 | 44 | Viktor Kamotski | Belarus | 2:15:02.9 | +7:42.6 |
| 22 | 54 | Jaanus Teppan | Estonia | 2:16:18.8 | +8:58.5 |
| 23 | 33 | Patrick Remy | France | 2:16:21.4 | +9:01.1 |
| 24 | 32 | Kazunari Sasaki | Japan | 2:16:51.7 | +9:31.4 |
| 25 | 18 | Igor Obukhov | Belarus | 2:17:08.4 | +9:48.1 |
| 26 | 17 | Andrus Veerpalu | Estonia | 2:17:24.7 | +10:04.4 |
| 27 | 70 | Niklas Jonsson | Sweden | 2:17:54.9 | +10:34.6 |
| 28 | 24 | Hiroyuki Imai | Japan | 2:17:55.2 | +10:34.9 |
| 29 | 19 | Pavel Ryabinin | Kazakhstan | 2:18:08.1 | +10:47.8 |
| 30 | 39 | Markus Hasler | Liechtenstein | 2:18:40.1 | +11:19.8 |
| 31 | 57 | Gianfranco Polvara | Italy | 2:18:40.3 | +11:20.0 |
| 32 | 49 | Ricardas Panavas | Lithuania | 2:19:01.3 | +11:41.0 |
| 33 | 27 | Cédric Vallet | France | 2:19:06.7 | +11:46.4 |
| 34 | 3 | Jordi Ribo | Spain | 2:19:21.9 | +12:01.6 |
| 35 | 28 | Justin Wadsworth | United States | 2:19:49.1 | +12:28.8 |
| 36 | 2 | Taivo Kuus | Estonia | 2:19:51.9 | +12:31.6 |
| 37 | 15 | Sami Repo | Finland | 2:20:32.8 | +13:12.5 |
| 38 | 30 | Stephan Kunz | Liechtenstein | 2:20:38.1 | +13:17.8 |
| 39 | 53 | Todd Boonstra | United States | 2:20:41.0 | +13:20.7 |
| 40 | 35 | Karri Hietamäki | Finland | 2:20:50.9 | +13:30.6 |
| 41 | 50 | Hans Diethelm | Switzerland | 2:21:01.8 | +13:41.5 |
| 42 | 22 | Carles Vicente | Spain | 2:21:03.5 | +13:43.2 |
| 43 | 43 | Vasili Gorbatchev | Belarus | 2:21:31.3 | +14:11.0 |
| 44 | 7 | Jürg Capol | Switzerland | 2:21:48.3 | +14:28.0 |
| 45 | 11 | Sergey Margatsky | Kazakhstan | 2:21:57.9 | +14:37.6 |
| 46 | 10 | Philippe Sanchez | France | 2:22:01.0 | +14:40.7 |
| 47 | 42 | Anthony Evans | Australia | 2:22:05.2 | +14:44.9 |
| 48 | 8 | Kazutoshi Nagahama | Japan | 2:22:30.2 | +15:09.9 |
| 49 | 9 | Pete Vordenberg | United States | 2:22:53.1 | +15:32.8 |
| 50 | 48 | Nikolay Ivanov | Kazakhstan | 2:22:59.1 | +15:38.8 |
| 51 | 38 | Dany Bouchard | Canada | 2:23:09.0 | +15:48.7 |
| 52 | 26 | Antonio Rački | Croatia | 2:23:23.4 | +16:03.1 |
| 53 | 40 | Benjamin Husaby | United States | 2:23:37.3 | +16:17.0 |
| 54 | 46 | Siniša Vukonić | Croatia | 2:24:12.6 | +16:52.3 |
| 55 | 55 | Daníel Jakobsson | Iceland | 2:24:57.0 | +17:36.7 |
| 56 | 31 | Peter Schlickenrieder | Germany | 2:25:22.4 | +18:02.1 |
| 57 | 45 | Ebbe Hartz | Denmark | 2:25:58.5 | +18:38.2 |
| 58 | 21 | Ondrej Valenta | Czech Republic | 2:26:08.6 | +18:48.3 |
| 59 | 14 | Mark Gray | Australia | 2:28:51.6 | +21:31.3 |
| 60 | 23 | Rögnvaldur Ingþórsson | Iceland | 2:32:52.9 | +25:32.6 |
| 61 | 6 | Jānis Hermanis | Latvia | 2:36:11.1 | +28:50.8 |
| | 12 | Janko Neuber | Germany | DNF | |
| | 25 | Elemer Tanko | Romania | DNF | |
| | 29 | Giachem Guidon | Switzerland | DNF | |
| | 41 | Martin Petrásek | Czech Republic | DNF | |
| | 68 | Jochen Behle | Germany | DNF | |
| | 1 | Torald Rein | Germany | DNS | |
| | 4 | Sergei Dolidovich | Belarus | DNS | |
| | 5 | Pavel Benc | Czech Republic | DNS | |
| | 13 | Michael Binzer | Denmark | DNS | |
| | 16 | Mathias Fredriksson | Sweden | DNS | |
| | 20 | David Belam | Great Britain | DNS | |
