= FIS Nordic World Ski Championships 1997 =

1997 ski competition in Trondheim, Norway

- Official logo for the FIS Nordic World Ski Championships 1997.
- Host city: Trondheim, Norway
- Events: 15
- Opening: 21 February 1997
- Closing: 2 March 1997
- Main venue: Granåsen Ski Centre

The FIS Nordic World Ski Championships 1997 took place from February 21 to March 2 at Granåsen Ski Centre in Trondheim, Norway. This event was the first time in consecutive championships that the number or type of events did not change since 1966 and 1970. It also was historical with Russia's Yelena Välbe winning gold in all five women's cross country events, the first person of either sex to do that honor. Norway's Bjørn Dæhlie became the first man to win five medals in five cross country events.

== Men's cross country ==
=== 10 km classical ===
February 24, 1997

| Medal | Athlete | Time |
|---|---|---|
| Gold | Bjørn Dæhlie (NOR) | 23:41.8 |
| Silver | Alexey Prokurorov (RUS) | 24:09.7 |
| Bronze | Mika Myllylä (FIN) | 24:14.2 |

=== 10 km + 15 km combined pursuit ===
February 25, 1997

| Medal | Athlete | Time |
|---|---|---|
| Gold | Bjørn Dæhlie (NOR) | 1:00:11.1 |
| Silver | Mika Myllylä (FIN) | 1:01:01.2 |
| Bronze | Alexey Prokurorov (RUS) | 1:01:01.8 |

=== 30 km freestyle ===
February 21, 1997

| Medal | Athlete | Time |
|---|---|---|
| Gold | Alexey Prokurorov (RUS) | 1:06:28.2 |
| Silver | Bjørn Dæhlie (NOR) | 1:06:45.6 |
| Bronze | Thomas Alsgaard (NOR) | 1:06:49.2 |

=== 50 km classical ===
March 2, 1997

| Medal | Athlete | Time |
|---|---|---|
| Gold | Mika Myllylä (FIN) | 2:16:37.5 |
| Silver | Erling Jevne (NOR) | 2:17:32.4 |
| Bronze | Bjørn Dæhlie (NOR) | 2:18:36.0 |

=== 4 × 10 km relay ===
February 28, 1997

| Medal | Team | Time |
|---|---|---|
| Gold | Norway (Sture Sivertsen, Erling Jevne, Bjørn Dæhlie, Thomas Alsgaard) | 1:37:06.1 |
| Silver | Finland (Harri Kirvesniemi, Mika Myllylä, Jari Räsänen, Jari Isometsä) | 1:39:17.3 |
| Bronze | Italy (Giorgio Di Centa, Silvio Fauner, Pietro Piller Cottrer, Fulvio Valbusa) | 1:39:56.9 |

== Women's cross country ==
=== 5 km classical ===
February 23, 1997

| Medal | Athlete | Time |
|---|---|---|
| Gold | Yelena Välbe (RUS) | 13:32.7 |
| Silver | Stefania Belmondo (ITA) | 13:35.0 |
| Bronze | Olga Danilova (RUS) | 13:37.7 |

Lyubov Yegorova of Russia finished first in this event, but was disqualified three days later for doping violation of bromotan. The three finishers behind her were subsequently awarded the medals shown.

=== 5 km + 10 km combined pursuit ===
February 24, 1997

The winner had to be determined by photo finish. The gold medal was won by Välbe by a 2 cm difference.

both athletes were still credited with the same time.

| Medal | Athlete | Time |
|---|---|---|
| Gold | Yelena Välbe (RUS) | 39:13.5 |
| Silver | Stefania Belmondo (ITA) | 39:13.5 |
| Bronze | Nina Gavrylyuk (RUS) | 39:32.1 |

=== 15 km freestyle ===
February 21, 1997

| Medal | Athlete | Time |
|---|---|---|
| Gold | Yelena Välbe (RUS) | 36:28.2 |
| Silver | Stefania Belmondo (ITA) | 36:39.1 |
| Bronze | Kateřina Neumannová (CZE) | 36:42.0 |

=== 30 km classical ===
March 1, 1997

| Medal | Athlete | Time |
|---|---|---|
| Gold | Yelena Välbe (RUS) | 1:23:04.9 |
| Silver | Stefania Belmondo (ITA) | 1:23:33.2 |
| Bronze | Marit Mikkelsplass (NOR) | 1:24:55.7 |

=== 4 × 5 km relay ===
February 28, 1997

| Medal | Team | Time |
|---|---|---|
| Gold | Russia (Olga Danilova, Larisa Lazutina, Nina Gavrylyuk, Yelena Välbe) | 56:40.2 |
| Silver | Norway (Bente Martinsen, Marit Mikkelsplass, Elin Nilsen, Trude Dybendahl Hartz) | 56:56.2 |
| Bronze | Finland (Riikka Sirviö, Tuulikki Pyykkönen, Kati Pulkkinen, Satu Salonen) | 57:38.4 |

== Men's Nordic combined ==
=== 15 km Individual Gundersen ===
February 22, 1997

| Medal | Athlete | Time |
|---|---|---|
| Gold | Kenji Ogiwara (JPN) | 43.58.1 |
| Silver | Bjarte Engen Vik (NOR) | + 30.8 |
| Bronze | Fabrice Guy (FRA) | + 1.19.4 |

=== 4 × 5 km team ===
February 23, 1997

| Medal | Team | Time |
|---|---|---|
| Gold | Norway (Halldor Skard, Bjarte Engen Vik, Knut Tore Apeland, Fred Børre Lundberg) | 52:18.0 |
| Silver | Finland (Jari Mantila, Tapio Nurmela, Samppa Lajunen, Hannu Manninen) | 53:03.6 |
| Bronze | Austria (Christoph Eugen, Felix Gottwald, Mario Stecher, Robert Stadelmann) | 53:30.9 |

== Men's ski jumping ==
=== Individual normal hill ===
February 22, 1997

| Medal | Athlete | Points |
|---|---|---|
| Gold | Janne Ahonen (FIN) | 263.5 |
| Silver | Masahiko Harada (JPN) | 258.5 |
| Bronze | Andreas Goldberger (AUT) | 257.0 |

=== Individual large hill ===
March 1, 1997

| Medal | Athlete | Points |
|---|---|---|
| Gold | Masahiko Harada (JPN) | 252.1 |
| Silver | Dieter Thoma (GER) | 244.9 |
| Bronze | Sylvain Freiholz (SUI) | 237.3 |

=== Team large hill ===
February 27, 1997

| Medal | Team | Points |
|---|---|---|
| Gold | Finland (Ari-Pekka Nikkola, Jani Soininen, Mika Laitinen, Janne Ahonen) | 955.3 |
| Silver | Japan (Kazuyoshi Funaki, Takanobu Okabe, Masahiko Harada, Hiroya Saito) | 905.0 |
| Bronze | Germany (Christof Duffner, Martin Schmitt, Hansjörg Jäkle, Dieter Thoma) | 845.6 |

== Medal table ==
Medal winners by nation.

* Host nation (Norway)

| Rank | Nation | Gold | Silver | Bronze | Total |
|---|---|---|---|---|---|
| 1 | Russia (RUS) | 6 | 1 | 3 | 10 |
| 2 | Norway (NOR)* | 4 | 4 | 3 | 11 |
| 3 | Finland (FIN) | 3 | 3 | 2 | 8 |
| 4 | Japan (JPN) | 2 | 2 | 0 | 4 |
| 5 | Italy (ITA) | 0 | 4 | 1 | 5 |
| 6 | Germany (GER) | 0 | 1 | 1 | 2 |
| 7 | Austria (AUT) | 0 | 0 | 2 | 2 |
| 8 | Czech Republic (CZE) | 0 | 0 | 1 | 1 |
| 8 | France (FRA) | 0 | 0 | 1 | 1 |
| 8 | Switzerland (SUI) | 0 | 0 | 1 | 1 |
| Totals (10 entries) | | 15 | 15 | 15 | 45 |
