= 1993–94 FIS Cross-Country World Cup =

Cross-country skiing competition

| Discipline | Men | Women |
| Overall | (Kazakhstan) Vladimir Smirnov (2nd title) | (Italy) Manuela Di Centa |
| Nations Cup | Norway | Russia |
- Nations Cup Overall: Norway

Competition
| Locations | 9 venues | 9 venues |
| Individual | 13 events | 13 events |
| Relay/Team | 6 events | 6 events |

The 1993–94 FIS Cross-Country World Cup was the 13th official World Cup season in cross-country skiing for men and women. The season began in Santa Caterina, Italy, on 11 December 1993 and finished in Thunder Bay, Canada, on 20 March 1994. Vladimir Smirnov of Kazakhstan won the combined men's cup, and Manuela Di Centa of Italy won the women's.

== Calendar ==
=== Men ===
C – Classic / F – Freestyle
| No. | Date | Venue | Event | Winner | Second | Third | Ref. |
|---|---|---|---|---|---|---|---|
| 1 | 11 December 1993 | (Italy) Santa Caterina | 30 km C | (Kazakhstan) Vladimir Smirnov | (Sweden) Torgny Mogren | (Sweden) Niklas Jonsson | |
| 2 | 18 December 1993 | (Switzerland) Davos | 15 km F | (Norway) Bjørn Dæhlie | (Norway) Vegard Ulvang | (Sweden) Torgny Mogren | |
| 3 | 21 December 1993 | (Italy) Toblach | 10 km C | (Kazakhstan) Vladimir Smirnov | (Finland) Jari Isometsä | (Norway) Sture Sivertsen | |
| 4 | 22 December 1993 | (Italy) Toblach | 15 km F Pursuit | (Kazakhstan) Vladimir Smirnov | (Italy) Silvio Fauner | (Norway) Bjørn Dæhlie | |
| 5 | 9 January 1994 | (Russia) Kavgolovo | 15 km C | (Kazakhstan) Vladimir Smirnov | (Norway) Bjørn Dæhlie | (Finland) Mika Myllylä | |
| 6 | 15 January 1994 | (Norway) Oslo | 15 km F | (Kazakhstan) Vladimir Smirnov | (Norway) Bjørn Dæhlie | (Finland) Mika Myllylä | |
1994 Winter Olympics (12–27 February)
| 7 | 14 February 1994 | (Norway) Lillehammer | 30 km F | (Norway) Thomas Alsgaard | (Norway) Bjørn Dæhlie | (Finland) Mika Myllylä | |
| 8 | 17 February 1994 | (Norway) Lillehammer | 10 km C | (Norway) Bjørn Dæhlie | (Kazakhstan) Vladimir Smirnov | (Italy) Marco Albarello | |
| 9 | 19 February 1994 | (Norway) Lillehammer | 15 km F Pursuit | (Norway) Bjørn Dæhlie | (Kazakhstan) Vladimir Smirnov | (Italy) Silvio Fauner | |
| 10 | 27 February 1994 | (Norway) Lillehammer | 50 km C | (Kazakhstan) Vladimir Smirnov | (Finland) Mika Myllylä | (Norway) Sture Sivertsen | |
| 11 | 5 March 1994 | (Finland) Lahti | 15 km F | (Kazakhstan) Vladimir Smirnov | (Norway) Bjørn Dæhlie | (Sweden) Anders Bergström | |
| 12 | 12 March 1994 | (Sweden) Falun | 30 km C | (Finland) Harri Kirvesniemi | (Finland) Mika Myllylä | (Norway) Sture Sivertsen | |
| 13 | 19 March 1994 | (Canada) Thunder Bay | 50 km F | (Russia) Alexey Prokourorov | (France) Herve Balland | (Italy) Silvano Barco | |

=== Women ===
C – Classic / F – Freestyle
| No. | Date | Venue | Event | Winner | Second | Third | Ref. |
|---|---|---|---|---|---|---|---|
| 1 | 11 December 1993 | (Italy) Santa Caterina | 5 km C | (Russia) Yelena Välbe | (Russia) Lyubov Yegorova | (Italy) Stefania Belmondo | |
| 2 | 18 December 1993 | (Switzerland) Davos | 10 km F | (Russia) Yelena Välbe | (Italy) Stefania Belmondo | (Italy) Manuela Di Centa | |
| 3 | 21 December 1993 | (Italy) Toblach | 15 km C | (Italy) Manuela Di Centa | (Russia) Lyubov Yegorova | (Russia) Yelena Välbe | |
| 4 | 8 January 1994 | (Russia) Kavgolovo | 10 km C | (Russia) Lyubov Yegorova | (Finland) Marja-Liisa Kirvesniemi | (Russia) Yelena Välbe | |
| 5 | 15 January 1994 | (Norway) Oslo | 15 km F | (Russia) Lyubov Yegorova | (Italy) Manuela Di Centa | (Russia) Natalya Martynova | |
1994 Winter Olympics (12–27 February 1994)
| 6 | 13 February 1994 | (Norway) Lillehammer | 15 km F | (Italy) Manuela Di Centa | (Russia) Lyubov Yegorova | (Russia) Nina Gavrylyuk | |
| 7 | 15 February 1994 | (Norway) Lillehammer | 5 km C | (Russia) Lyubov Yegorova | (Italy) Manuela Di Centa | (Finland) Marja-Liisa Kirvesniemi | |
| 8 | 17 February 1994 | (Norway) Lillehammer | 10 km F Pursuit | (Russia) Lyubov Yegorova | (Italy) Manuela Di Centa | (Italy) Stefania Belmondo | |
| 9 | 24 February 1994 | (Norway) Lillehammer | 30 km C | (Italy) Manuela Di Centa | (Norway) Marit Wold | (Finland) Marja-Liisa Kirvesniemi | |
| 10 | 6 March 1994 | (Finland) Lahti | 30 km F | (Italy) Manuela Di Centa | (Russia) Lyubov Yegorova | (Italy) Stefania Belmondo | |
| 11 | 12 March 1994 | (Sweden) Falun | 10 km F | (Italy) Manuela Di Centa | (Russia) Yelena Välbe | (Norway) Trude Dybendahl | |
| 12 | 19 March 1994 | (Canada) Thunder Bay | 5 km C | (Russia) Larisa Lazutina | (Norway) Inger Helene Nybråten | (Russia) Svetlana Nageykina | |
| 13 | 20 March 1994 | (Canada) Thunder Bay | 10 km F | (Italy) Manuela Di Centa | (Russia) Larisa Lazutina | (Russia) Lyubov Yegorova | |

Note: Until 1994 Winter Olympics, Olympic races are part of the World Cup. Hence results from those races are included in the World Cup overall.

=== Men's team ===
C – Classic / F – Freestyle
| WC | Date | Place | Discipline | Winner | Second | Third | Ref. |
|---|---|---|---|---|---|---|---|
| 1 | 19 December 1993 | (Switzerland) Davos | 4 × 10 km relay C | Norway I Sture Sivertsen; Vegard Ulvang; Thomas Alsgaard; Bjørn Dæhlie | Russia I Andrey Kirillov; Igor Badamshin; Mikhail Botvinov; Alexei Prokourorov | Finland Jari Isometsä; Harri Kirvesniemi; Jukka Hartonen; Mika Myllylä | |
| 2 | 16 January 1993 | (Norway) Oslo | 4 × 10 km relay F | Finland Jari Räsänen; Jukka Hartonen; Mika Myllylä; Jari Isometsä | Italy I Silvano Barco; Gianfranco Polvara; Giorgio Vanzetta; Silvio Fauner | Norway I Egil Kristiansen; Vegard Ulvang; Bjørn Dæhlie; Thomas Alsgaard | |
| 3 | 22 February 1994 | (Norway) Lillehammer | 4 × 10 km relay C/F | Italy Maurilio De Zolt; Marco Albarello; Giorgio Vanzetta; Silvio Fauner | Norway Sture Sivertsen; Vegard Ulvang; Thomas Alsgaard; Bjørn Dæhlie | Finland Mika Myllylä; Harri Kirvesniemi; Jari Räsänen; Jari Isometsä | |
| 4 | 4 March 1994 | (Finland) Lahti | 4 × 10 km relay C | Finland I Sami Repo; Harri Kirvesniemi; Jari Isometsä; Jari Räsänen | Norway Kristen Skjeldal; Anders Eide; Egil Kristiansen; Thomas Alsgaard | Finland II Kuisma Taipale; Mika Kuusisto; Karri Hietamäki; Sami Heiskanen | |
| 5 | 13 March 1994 | (Sweden) Falun | 4 × 10 km relay F | Norway I Sture Sivertsen; Erling Jevne; Vegard Ulvang; Bjørn Dæhlie | Italy I Silvano Barco; Maurilio De Zolt; Giorgio Vanzetta; Silvio Fauner | Sweden I Anders Bergström; Torgny Mogren; Lars Håland; Henrik Forsberg | |
| 6 | 20 March 1994 | (Canada) Thunder Bay | 4 × 10 km relay C/F | Norway I Krister Sørgård; Vegard Ulvang; Bjørn Dæhlie; Thomas Alsgaard | Finland Sami Repo; Mika Kuusisto; Jari Isometsä; Jukka Hartonen | Sweden Niklas Jonsson; Christer Majbäck; Henrik Forsberg; Torgny Mogren | |

=== Women's team ===
C – Classic / F – Freestyle
| WC | Date | Place | Discipline | Winner | Second | Third | Ref. |
|---|---|---|---|---|---|---|---|
| 1 | 12 December 1993 | (Italy) Santa Caterina | 4 × 5 km relay C | Russia Svetlana Nageykina; Larisa Lazutina; Nina Gavrylyuk; Yelena Välbe | Finland Pirkko Määttä; Marja-Liisa Kirvesniemi; Tuulikki Pyykkönen; Marjut Rolig | Norway I Trude Dybendahl; Marit Wold; Elin Nilsen; Inger Helene Nybråten | |
| 2 | 22 December 1993 | (Italy) Toblach | 4 × 5 km relay F | Russia I Larisa Lazutina; Olga Danilova; Lyubov Yegorova; Yelena Välbe | Russia II Svetlana Nageykina; Nina Gavrylyuk; Natalya Martynova; Yelena Shalina | Italy Guidina Dal Sasso; Stefania Belmondo; Gabriella Paruzzi; Manuela Di Centa | |
| 3 | 16 January 1993 | (Norway) Oslo | 4 × 5 km relay F | Russia Svetlana Nageykina; Yelena Välbe; Natalya Martynova; Lyubov Yegorova | Italy Bice Vanzetta; Gabriella Paruzzi; Manuela Di Centa; Stefania Belmondo | Norway I Anita Moen; Elin Nilsen; Marit Wold; Trude Dybendahl | |
| 4 | 22 February 1994 | (Norway) Lillehammer | 4 × 5 km relay C/F | Russia Yelena Välbe; Larisa Lazutina; Nina Gavrylyuk; Lyubov Yegorova | Norway Trude Dybendahl; Inger Helene Nybråten; Elin Nilsen; Anita Moen | Italy Bice Vanzetta; Manuela Di Centa; Gabriella Paruzzi; Stefania Belmondo | |
| 5 | 4 March 1994 | (Finland) Lahti | 4 × 5 km relay C | Norway Anita Moen; Inger Helene Nybråten; Marit Wold; Trude Dybendahl | Russia Svetlana Nageykina; Larisa Lazutina; Nina Gavrylyuk; Yelena Välbe | Finland I Marjut Rolig; Tuulikki Pyykkönen; Merja Lahtinen; Marja-Liisa Kirvesniemi | |
| 6 | 13 March 1994 | (Sweden) Falun | 4 × 5 km relay F | Russia Svetlana Nageykina; Nina Gavrylyuk; Larisa Lazutina; Yelena Välbe | Norway I Anita Moen; Inger Helene Nybråten; Marit Wold; Trude Dybendahl | Sweden I Anna Frithioff; Marie-Helene Östlund; Antonina Ordina; Lis Frost | |

== Overall standings ==
=== Men ===
| Rank | | Points |
|---|---|---|
| 1 | (Kazakhstan) Vladimir Smirnov | 830 |
| 2 | (Norway) Bjørn Dæhlie | 680 |
| 3 | (Finland) Jari Isometsä | 442 |
| 4 | (Finland) Mika Myllylä | 430 |
| 5 | (Italy) Silvio Fauner | 412 |
| 6 | (Norway) Vegard Ulvang | 346 |
| 7 | (Norway) Thomas Alsgaard | 326 |
| 8 | (Sweden) Torgny Mogren | 316 |
| 9 | (Russia) Alexey Prokurorov | 294 |
| 10 | (Norway) Sture Sivertsen | 289 |

=== Women ===
| Rank | | Points |
|---|---|---|
| 1 | (Italy) Manuela Di Centa | 790 |
| 2 | (Russia) Lyubov Yegorova | 740 |
| 3 | (Russia) Yelena Välbe | 570 |
| 4 | (Italy) Stefania Belmondo | 481 |
| 5 | (Russia) Larisa Lazutina | 458 |
| 6 | (Norway) Inger Helene Nybråten | 362 |
| 7 | (Russia) Nina Gavrylyuk | 356 |
| 8 | (Norway) Trude Dybendahl | 319 |
| 9 | (Finland) Marja-Liisa Kirvesniemi | 264 |
| 10 | (Norway) Marit Wold | 247 |

== Achievements ==
Victories in this World Cup (all-time number of victories as of 1993/94 season in parentheses)

Men

- Vladimir Smirnov (KAZ), 7 (16) first places
- Bjørn Dæhlie (NOR), 3 (19) first places
- Alexey Prokourorov (RUS), 1 (5) first place
- Harri Kirvesniemi (FIN), 1 (4) first place
- Thomas Alsgaard (NOR), 1 (1) first place

Women

- Manuela Di Centa (ITA), 6 (8) first places
- Lyubov Yegorova (RUS), 4 (11) first places
- Yelena Välbe (RUS), 2 (24) first places
- Larisa Lazutina (RUS), 1 (3) first place
