= Andi Grünenfelder =

Swiss cross-country skier (born 1960)

Personal information
- Nationality: Switzerland
- Born: 7 September 1960 (age 65) Vilters-Wangs, Switzerland

Sport
- Sport: Skiing
- Club: SC Alpina

World Cup career
- Seasons: 1982–1989
- Indiv. starts: 33
- Indiv. podiums: 2
- Indiv. wins: 0
- Team starts: 4
- Team podiums: 1
- Team wins: 0
- Overall titles: 0 – (7th in 1984)
Medal record
Men's cross-country skiing
Representing Switzerland
Olympic Games
Bronze medal – third place	1988 Calgary	50 km freestyle

Andreas "Andi" Grünenfelder (born September 17, 1960) is a former Swiss cross-country skier who competed from 1982 to 1989. He earned a bronze in the 50 km at the 1988 Winter Olympics in Calgary.

== Cross-country skiing results ==
All results are sourced from the International Ski Federation (FIS).

=== Olympic Games ===
- 1 medal – (1 bronze)

Year	Age	15 km	30 km	50 km	4 × 10 km relay
1984	23	11	19	6	5
1988	27	35	DNF	Bronze	4

=== World Championships ===
Year	Age	15 km classical	15 km freestyle	30 km	50 km	4 × 10 km relay
1982	21	20	—N/a	—	—	—
1985	24	10	—N/a	12	—	5
1987	26	—	—N/a	—	4	7
1989	28	—	34	—	—	—

=== World Cup ===
==== Season standings ====
Season	Age	Overall
1982	21	67
1983	22	10
1984	23	7
1985	24	20
1986	25	26
1987	26	12
1988	27	20
1989	28	NC

==== Individual podiums ====
- 2 podiums

No.	Season	Date	Location	Race	Level	Place
1	1983–84	17 March 1984	Fairbanks, United States	15 km Individual	World Cup	2nd
2	1987–88	27 February 1988	Calgary, Canada	50 km Individual F	Olympic Games^{[1]}	3rd

Note: ^{1} Until the 1994 Winter Olympics, Olympic races were included in the World Cup scoring system.

==== Team podiums ====
- 1 podium

No.	Season	Date	Location	Race	Level	Place	Teammates
1	1984–85	17 March 1985	Oslo, Norway	4 × 10 km Relay	World Cup	2nd	Sandoz / Fähndrich / Guidon
