= 1984–85 FIS Cross-Country World Cup =

Cross-country skiing competition

Discipline	Men	Women
Overall	(Sweden) Gunde Svan (2nd title)	(Norway) Anette Bøe
Nations Cup	Norway	Norway
- Nations Cup Overall: Norway

Competition
Locations	8 venues	9 venues
Individual	10 events	11 events
Relay/Team	5 events	5 events

The 1984–85 FIS Cross-Country World Cup was the 4th official World Cup season in cross-country skiing for men and women. The World Cup began in Cogne, Italy on 9 December 1984 and finished in Oslo, Norway on 17 March 1985. Gunde Svan of Sweden won the overall men's cup, and Anette Bøe of Norway won the women's.

== Calendar ==
=== Men ===
No.	Date	Venue	Event	Winner	Second	Third	Ref.
1	9 December 1984	(Italy) Cogne	15 km	(Norway) Pål Gunnar Mikkelsplass	(Finland) Kari Härkönen	(Sweden) Gunde Svan	
2	15 December 1984	(Switzerland) Davos	30 km	(Norway) Ove Aunli	(Norway) Pål Gunnar Mikkelsplass	(Norway) Tor Håkon Holte	
FIS Nordic World Ski Championships 1985
3	18 January 1985	(Austria) Seefeld	30 km *	(Sweden) Gunde Svan	(Norway) Ove Aunli	(Finland) Harri Kirvesniemi	
4	22 January 1985	(Austria) Seefeld	15 km *	(Finland) Kari Härkönen	(Sweden) Thomas Wassberg	(Italy) Maurilio De Zolt	
5	27 January 1985	(Austria) Seefeld	50 km *	(Sweden) Gunde Svan	(Italy) Maurilio De Zolt	(Norway) Ove Aunli	
6	16 February 1985	(Bulgaria) Vitosha	15 km	(Sweden) Gunde Svan	(Norway) Tor Håkon Holte	(Norway) Pål Gunnar Mikkelsplass	
7	23 February 1985	(Soviet Union) Syktyvkar	15 km	(Sweden) Gunde Svan	(Norway) Tor Håkon Holte	(Sweden) Christer Majbäck	
8	3 March 1985	(Finland) Lahti	50 km	(Norway) Tor Håkon Holte	(Sweden) Jan Ottosson	(Finland) Harri Kirvesniemi	
9	9 March 1985	(Sweden) Falun	30 km	(Sweden) Gunde Svan	(Switzerland) Giachem Guidon	(Sweden) Thomas Wassberg	
10	14 March 1985	(Norway) Oslo	15 km	(Sweden) Thomas Wassberg	(Sweden) Gunde Svan	(Norway) Pål Gunnar Mikkelsplass	

=== Women ===
No.	Date	Venue	Event	Winner	Second	Third	Ref.
1	13 December 1984	(Italy) Val di Sole	5 km	(Norway) Brit Pettersen	(Soviet Union) Antonina Ordina	(Soviet Union) Liliya Vasilchenko	
2	18 December 1984	(Switzerland) Davos	10 km	(Norway) Berit Aunli	(Norway) Grete Ingeborg Nykkelmo	(Switzerland) Evi Kratzer	
FIS Nordic World Ski Championships 1985
3	19 January 1985	(Austria) Seefeld	10 km *	(Norway) Anette Bøe	(Finland) Marja-Liisa Kirvesniemi	(Norway) Grete Ingeborg Nykkelmo	
4	21 January 1985	(Austria) Seefeld	5 km *	(Norway) Anette Bøe	(Finland) Marja-Liisa Kirvesniemi	(Norway) Grete Ingeborg Nykkelmo	
5	26 January 1985	(Austria) Seefeld	20 km *	(Norway) Grete Ingeborg Nykkelmo	(Norway) Brit Pettersen	(Norway) Anette Bøe	
6	14 February 1985	(East Germany) Klingenthal	10 km	(Norway) Anette Bøe	(Norway) Grete Ingeborg Nykkelmo	(Soviet Union) Anfisa Reztsova	
7	18 February 1985	(Czechoslovakia) Nové Město	5 km	(Norway) Anette Bøe	(Soviet Union) Anfisa Reztsova	(Czechoslovakia) Věra Klimková	
8	23 February 1985	(Soviet Union) Syktyvkar	20 km	(Soviet Union) Raisa Smetanina	(Switzerland) Evi Kratzer	(Soviet Union) Iraida Kliagina	
9	2 March 1985	(Finland) Lahti	5 km	(Sweden) Marie Risby	(Norway) Brit Pettersen	(Norway) Marianne Dahlmo	
10	9 March 1985	(Sweden) Falun	10 km	(Norway) Anette Bøe	(Norway) Grete Ingeborg Nykkelmo	(Sweden) Anna-Lena Fritzon	
11	16 March 1985	(Norway) Oslo	20 km	(Norway) Anette Bøe	(Norway) Grete Ingeborg Nykkelmo	(Norway) Brit Pettersen	

=== Men's team events ===
Date	Venue	Event	Winner	Second	Third	Ref.
16 December 1984	(Switzerland) Davos	Relay 4×10 km	Norway I Arild Monsen; Oddvar Brå; Geir Holte; Tor Håkon Holte	Switzerland I Andi Grünenfelder; Daniel Sandoz; Markus Fähndrich; Giachem Guidon	Sweden II Erik Östlund; Thomas Wassberg; Sven-Erik Danielsson; Torgny Mogren	
24 January 1985	(Austria) Seefeld	Relay 4×10 km *	Norway Arild Monsen; Pål Gunnar Mikkelsplass; Tor Håkon Holte; Ove Aunli	Italy Marco Albarello; Giorgio Vanzetta; Maurilio De Zolt; Giuseppe Ploner	Sweden Erik Östlund; Thomas Wassberg; Thomas Eriksson; Gunde Svan	
16 February 1985	(Bulgaria) Vitosha	Relay 4×10 km	Sweden Erik Östlund; Jan Ottosson; Torgny Mogren; Gunde Svan	Switzerland Andi Grünenfelder; Markus Fähndrich; Christian Marchon; Giachem Guidon	Soviet Union Nikolay Zimyatov; Vladimir Sakhnov; Vladimir Smirnov; Oleksandr Batyuk	
10 March 1985	(Sweden) Falun	Relay 4×10 km	Italy Albert Walder; Silvano Barco; Maurilio De Zolt; Giorgio Vanzetta	Sweden Erik Östlund; Thomas Wassberg; Torgny Mogren; Gunde Svan	Norway Arild Monsen; Tor Håkon Holte; Geir Holte; Pål Gunnar Mikkelsplass	
17 March 1985	(Norway) Oslo	Relay 4×10 km	Sweden Thomas Eriksson; Sven-Erik Danielsson; Thomas Wassberg; Gunde Svan	Switzerland Andi Grünenfelder; Daniel Sandoz; Markus Fähndrich; Giachem Guidon	Norway Martin Hole; Pål Gunnar Mikkelsplass; Vegard Ulvang; Ove Aunli	

=== Women's team events ===
Date	Venue	Event	Winner	Second	Third	Ref.
13 December 1984	(Italy) Val di Sole	Relay 3×5 km	Finland Pirkko Määttä; Marja-Liisa Hämäläinen; Marjo Matikainen	Soviet Union Antonina Ordina; Raisa Smetanina; Liliya Vasilchenko	Soviet Union Anfisa Romanova; Yuliya Stepanova; Lyubov Zimyatova	
19 December 1984	(Switzerland) Davos	Relay 4×5 km	Norway Grete Ingeborg Nykkelmo; Berit Aunli; Marianne Dahlmo; Anette Bøe	Soviet Union Antonina Ordina; Raisa Smetanina; Liliya Vasilchenko; Yuliya Stepanova	Sweden I Marie Risby; Helena Blomqvist; Karin Lamberg-Skog; Marie Johansson	
23 January 1985	(Austria) Seefeld	Relay 4×5 km *	Soviet Union Tamara Tikhonova; Raisa Smetanina; Liliya Vasilchenko; Anfisa Romanova	Norway Anette Bøe; Anne Jahren; Grete Ingeborg Nykkelmo; Berit Aunli	East Germany Manuela Drescher; Gaby Nestler; Antje Misersky; Ute Noack	
10 March 1985	(Sweden) Falun	Relay 4×5 km	Norway Grete Ingeborg Nykkelmo; Trude Dybendahl; Marianne Dahlmo; Anette Bøe	Sweden Marie Risby; Marie Johansson; Anna-Lena Fritzon; Karin Lamberg-Skog	Finland Pirkko Määttä; Eija Hyytiäinen; Marjo Matikainen; Marja-Liisa Hämäläinen	
17 March 1985	(Norway) Oslo	Relay 4×5 km	Norway Grete Ingeborg Nykkelmo; Anne Jahren; Berit Aunli; Anette Bøe	Sweden Marie Johansson; Gunnel Mörtberg; Anna-Lena Fritzon; Karin Lamberg-Skog	East Germany Antje Misersky; Gaby Nestler; Simone Opitz; Ute Noack	

- NOTE: Races marked with a star (*) counts officially for both as "FIS World Cup" and "FIS Nordic World Ski Championships" wins statistics.

== Overall standings ==
=== Men's standings ===
Place	Skier	Country	Points
1.	Gunde Svan	(Sweden)	152
2.	Tor Håkon Holte	(Norway)	117
3.	Ove Aunli	(Norway)	114
3.	Thomas Wassberg	(Sweden)	114
5.	Pål Gunnar Mikkelsplass	(Norway)	100
6.	Torgny Mogren	(Sweden)	85
7.	Kari Härkönen	(Finland)	73
8.	Giachem Guidon	(Switzerland)	71
9.	Harri Kirvesniemi	(Finland)	66
10.	Geir Holte	(Norway)	65

=== Women's standings ===
Place	Skier	Country	Points
1.	Anette Bøe	(Norway)	144
2.	Grete Ingeborg Nykkelmo	(Norway)	123
3.	Brit Pettersen	(Norway)	113
4.	Berit Aunli	(Norway)	96
5.	Evi Kratzer	(Switzerland)	93
6.	Ute Noack	(East Germany)	91
6.	Anfisa Reztsova	(Soviet Union)	91
8.	Marie Risby	(Sweden)	85
8.	Raisa Smetanina	(Soviet Union)	85
10.	Marjo Matikainen	(Finland)	80

== Medal table ==
Rank	Nation	Gold	Silver	Bronze	Total
1	Norway (NOR)	13	11	9	33
2	Sweden (SWE)	7	3	5	15
3	Soviet Union (URS)	2	2	3	7
4	Finland (FIN)	1	3	2	6
5	Italy (ITA)	0	2	1	3
5	Switzerland (SUI)	0	2	1	3
7	Czechoslovakia (TCH)	0	0	1	1
7	East Germany (GDR)	0	0	1	1
Totals (8 entries)		23	23	23	69

== Achievements ==
First World Cup career victory

Men

- (Norway) Ove Aunli, 28, in his 4th season – the WC 2 (30 km) in Davos; first podium was 1983–84 WC 2 (30 km) in Ramsau
- (Finland) Kari Härkönen, 23, in his 4th season – the WC 4 (15 km) in Seefeld; also first podium

Women

- (Norway) Grete Ingeborg Nykkelmo, 23, in her 4th season – the WC 5 (20 km) in Ramsau; first podium was 1984–85 WC 2 (10 km) in Davos
- (Sweden) Marie Risby, 29, in her 4th season – the WC 9 (5 km) in Lahti; first podium was 1982–83 WC 2 (10 km) in Klingenthal

Victories in this World Cup (all-time number of victories as of 1984–85 season in parentheses)

Men

- Gunde Svan (SWE), 5 (11) first places
- Ove Aunli (NOR), 2 (2) first places
- Thomas Wassberg (SWE), 1 (3) first place
- Tor Håkon Holte (NOR), 1 (2) first place
- Kari Härkönen (FIN), 1 (1) first place

Women

- Anette Bøe (NOR), 6 (8) first place
- Berit Aunli (NOR), 1 (4) first place
- Raisa Smetanina (URS), 1 (3) first place
- Brit Pettersen (NOR), 1 (6) first place
- Grete Ingeborg Nykkelmo (NOR), 1 (1) first place
- Marie Risby (SWE), 1 (1) first place
