= Giachem Guidon =

Swiss cross-country skier

Personal information
- Nationality: Switzerland
- Born: 4 September 1961 (age 64) Bever, Switzerland

Sport
- Sport: Skiing
- Club: SC Alpina

World Cup career
- Seasons: 1982–1989, 1991–1994
- Indiv. starts: 63
- Indiv. podiums: 2
- Indiv. wins: 0
- Team starts: 9
- Team podiums: 1
- Team wins: 0
- Overall titles: 0 – (8th in 1985)

Giachem Guidon (born 4 September 1961 in Bever) is a Swiss cross-country skier who competed from 1982 to 1994. Competing in four Winter Olympics, he earned his best career finish of fourth in the 4 × 10 km relay at Calgary in 1988 and his best individual finish of 12th in the 15 km event at Sarajevo in 1984.

Guidon's best individual finish at the FIS Nordic World Ski Championships was eighth twice (30 km: 1985, 15 km: 1989). His best World Cup finish was second in a 30 km event in Sweden in 1985.

== Cross-country skiing results ==
All results are sourced from the International Ski Federation (FIS).

=== Olympic Games ===
| Year | Age | 10 km | 15 km | Pursuit | 30 km | 50 km | 4 × 10 km relay |
|---|---|---|---|---|---|---|---|
| 1984 | 20 | —N/a | 12 | —N/a | 20 | 19 | 5 |
| 1988 | 24 | —N/a | DNF | —N/a | 13 | 13 | 4 |
| 1992 | 28 | 44 | —N/a | 34 | 25 | 15 | — |
| 1994 | 30 | 48 | —N/a | DNS | 46 | DNF | 7 |

=== World Championships ===
| Year | Age | 10 km | 15 km classical | 15 km freestyle | Pursuit | 30 km | 50 km | 4 × 10 km relay |
|---|---|---|---|---|---|---|---|---|
| 1985 | 23 | —N/a | 19 | —N/a | —N/a | 8 | — | 5 |
| 1987 | 25 | —N/a | 19 | —N/a | —N/a | — | 13 | 7 |
| 1989 | 27 | —N/a | — | 8 | —N/a | 27 | 10 | 12 |
| 1991 | 29 | — | —N/a | 11 | —N/a | — | — | — |
| 1993 | 31 | 45 | —N/a | —N/a | DNS | 41 | 25 | 9 |

=== World Cup ===
==== Season standings ====
| Season | Age | Overall |
|---|---|---|
| 1982 | 20 | 47 |
| 1983 | 21 | 48 |
| 1984 | 22 | 12 |
| 1985 | 23 | 8 |
| 1986 | 24 | 21 |
| 1987 | 25 | 32 |
| 1988 | 26 | 17 |
| 1989 | 27 | 16 |
| 1991 | 29 | 31 |
| 1992 | 30 | 53 |
| 1993 | 31 | 79 |
| 1994 | 32 | NC |

==== Individual podiums ====
- 2 podiums

| No. | Season | Date | Location | Race | Level | Place |
|---|---|---|---|---|---|---|
| 1 | 1984–85 | 9 March 1985 | Falun, Sweden | 30 km Individual | World Cup | 2nd |
| 2 | 1987–88 | 15 January 1988 | (Czechoslovak Socialist Republic) Štrbské Pleso, Czechoslovakia | 15 km Individual F | World Cup | 3rd |

==== Team podiums ====
- 1 podium

| No. | Season | Date | Location | Race | Level | Place | Teammates |
|---|---|---|---|---|---|---|---|
| 1 | 1984–85 | 17 March 1985 | Oslo, Norway | 4 × 10 km Relay | World Cup | 2nd | Grünenfelder / Sandoz / Fähndrich |
