= Pelkonen =

Surname list

Pelkonen is a surname. It is most common in Finland and Sweden. Notable people with the surname include:

- Aarne Pelkonen (1891–1959), Finnish gymnast
- Jaana Pelkonen (born 1977), Finnish politician and television hostess
- Jyri Pelkonen (born 1965), Finnish Nordic combined skier
- Pentti Pelkonen (born 1930), Finnish cross-country skier
- Rainer Pelkonen (born 1928), Finnish hurdler
