= Aunli =

Aunli is a Norwegian surname. Notable people with the surname include:

- Berit Aunli (born 1956), Norwegian cross country skier, wife of Ove
- Ove Aunli (born 1956), Norwegian cross country skier
