= Numme =

Numme is a surname. Notable people with the surname include:

- Thomas Numme, Norwegian television presenter
- Yngvar Numme (1944–2023), Norwegian singer and actor
