= Lille Nøtteaften =

Norwegian television program

Lille nøtteaften is a Norwegian entertainment programme shown on TV 2 on Christmas Eve 2006 to 2008.

The programme was an alternative to Kvelden før kvelden on NRK, but also served as the start of TV 2's Christmas programming. Kristian Ødegård was the presenter for the first two years, while Atle Antonsen presented the last. The programme consisted of different puzzles to be solved and guests were largely the same as appeared on TV 2-nøttene. It was produced by Seefood TV.

The programme had 500,000 viewers in 2008.
