= Guri Solberg =

Norwegian television presenter (born 1976)

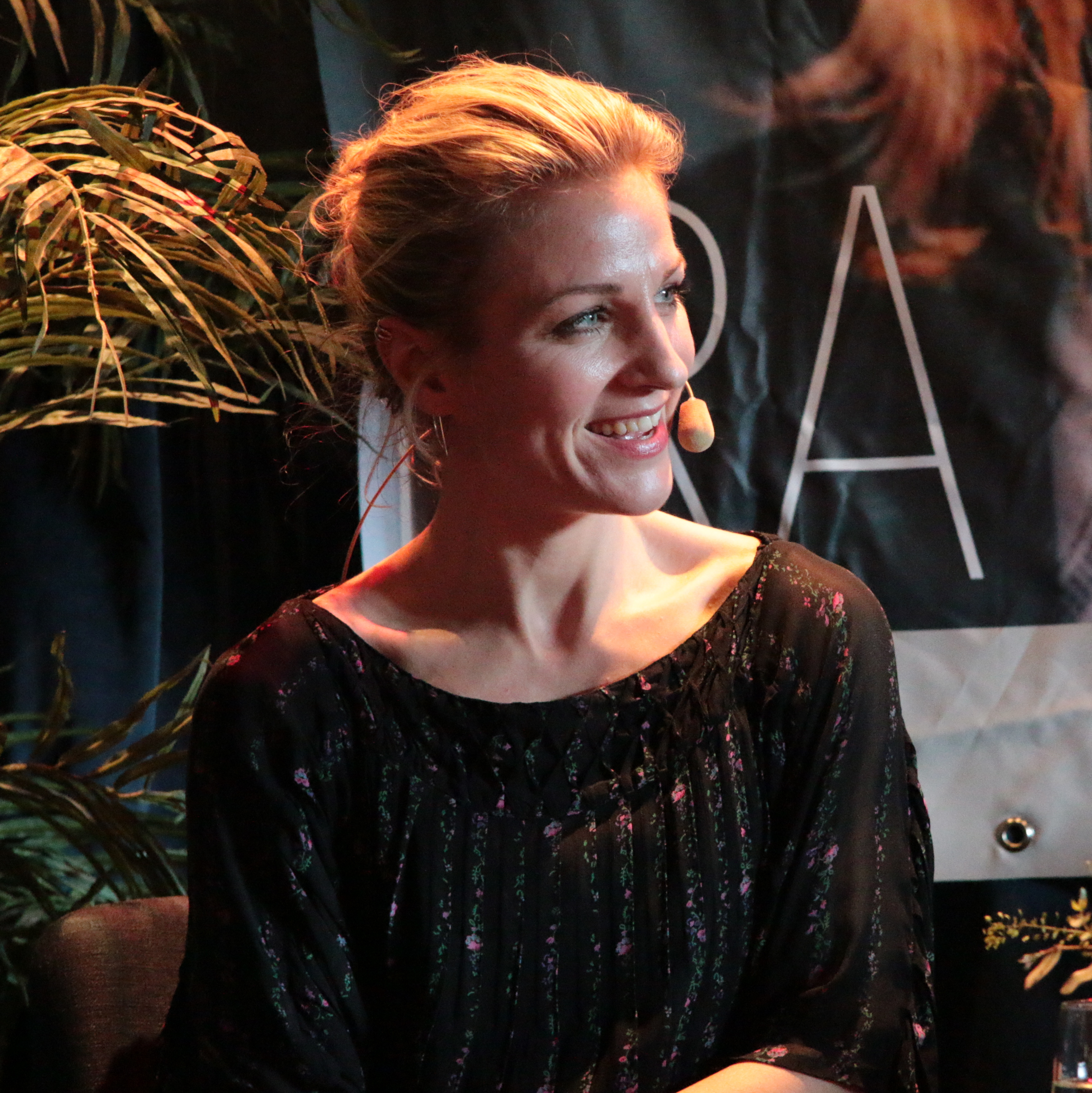
Guri Solberg, 2018

Guri Solberg (born 15 July 1976) is television host at the Norwegian TV station TV 2.

She was host of Absolutt Underholdning in 2004-2005, Skal vi danse? four times in 2006, 2007, 2008 and 2013 (on TV 2), and award ceremonies Amanda Award in 2008 and Gullfisken in 2007 and 2008.

Solberg is a journalist educated at Volda University College and has previously worked in television channels NRK P3 and NRK2. She hosted the Nordic Music Awards in October 2004 and in 2005.

She was a guest host for Norwegian Idol, during the maternity leave of presenter Solveig Kloppen. It was announced that she is hosting Norwegian X Factor in its 2nd season in 2010.

Guri Solberg is married to David Vogt who plays in the Norwegian band Real Ones.

Awards
Preceded by Harald Rønneberg, Thomas Numme	Se og Hør's TV Personality of the Year; 2008 (with Kristian Ødegård)	Succeeded by Tore Strømøy
