= Martin Hole =

Norwegian cross-country skier (1959–2024)

Personal information
- Nationality: Norway
- Born: 28 July 1959 Geilo, Norway
- Died: 20 February 2024 (aged 64)

Sport
- Sport: Skiing
- Club: Geilo IL

World Cup career
- Seasons: 5 – (1983, 1985–1988)
- Indiv. starts: 18
- Indiv. podiums: 1
- Indiv. wins: 0
- Team starts: 2
- Team podiums: 2
- Team wins: 0
- Overall titles: 0 – (10th in 1986)
Medal record
Men's cross-country skiing
Representing Norway
Junior World Championships
Bronze medal – third place	1979 Mont-Sainte-Anne	3 × 5 km relay

Martin Hole (28 July 1959 – 20 February 2024) was a Norwegian cross-country skier. He competed internationally in the 1980s, representing Norway in the world cup, two world championships, and one Olympics. He was twice national champion.

== Life and career ==
Hole was born in Geilo, and represented the club Geilo IL. He competed at the 1988 Winter Olympics in Calgary.

He won two Norwegian championships; 15 km in 1985 and 30 km in 1986. He competed at the 1985 and 1986 world championships, in addition to the 1988 Winter Olympics. His best world championship result was placing 11th in 50 km. He achieved one individual podium result in the world cup, a third place in 1986.

Hole died from cancer on 20 February 2024, at the age of 64.

== Cross-country skiing results ==
All results are sourced from the International Ski Federation (FIS).

=== Olympic Games ===
Year	Age	15 km	30 km	50 km	4 × 10 km relay
1988	28	—	31	—	—

=== World Championships ===
Year	Age	15 km	30 km	50 km	4 × 10 km relay
1985	25	14	—	—	—
1987	27	—	—	11	—

=== World Cup ===
==== Season standings ====
Season	Age	Overall
1983	23	45
1985	25	18
1986	26	10
1987	27	24
1988	28	30

==== Individual podiums ====
- 1 podium

No.	Season	Date	Location	Race	Level	Place
1	1985–86	8 March 1986	Falun, Sweden	30 km Individual C	World Cup	3rd

==== Team podiums ====
- 2 podiums

No.	Season	Date	Location	Race	Level	Place	Teammates
1	1984–85	17 March 1985	Oslo, Norway	4 × 10 km Relay	World Cup	3rd	Mikkelsplass / Ulvang / Aunli
2	1985–86	9 March 1986	Falun, Sweden	4 × 10 km Relay F	World Cup	2nd	Monsen / Ulvang / Mikkelsplass
