= Brimi =

Brimi is a Norwegian surname. Notable people with the surname include:

- Arne Brimi (born 1957), Norwegian chef and food writer
- Hans W. Brimi (1917–1998), Norwegian fiddler and traditional folk music performer
