= Geir Holte =

Norwegian cross-country skier

Personal information
- Nationality: Norway
- Born: 3 October 1959 (age 66) Drammen, Norway

Sport
- Sport: Skiing
- Club: Hokksund IL

World Cup career
- Seasons: 7 (1983–1989)
- Indiv. starts: 22
- Indiv. podiums: 0
- Team starts: 1
- Team podiums: 1
- Team wins: 0
- Overall titles: 0 – (10th in 1985)

Geir Holte (born 3 October 1959) is a Norwegian cross-country skier. He was born in Drammen, and represented the club Hokksund IL. He competed at the 1984 Winter Olympics in Sarajevo. He is the younger brother of cross-country skier Tor Håkon Holte.

== Cross-country skiing results ==
All results are sourced from the International Ski Federation (FIS).

=== Olympic Games ===
| Year | Age | 15 km | 30 km | 50 km | 4 × 10 km relay |
|---|---|---|---|---|---|
| 1984 | 24 | 20 | — | — | — |

=== World Championships ===
| Year | Age | 15 km classical | 15 km freestyle | 30 km | 50 km | 4 × 10 km relay |
|---|---|---|---|---|---|---|
| 1982 | 22 | 29 | —N/a | — | — | — |
| 1985 | 25 | — | —N/a | 18 | 20 | — |
| 1989 | 29 | — | — | 29 | — | — |

=== World Cup ===
==== Season standings ====
| Season | Age | Overall |
|---|---|---|
| 1982 | 22 | NC |
| 1983 | 23 | 32 |
| 1984 | 24 | 20 |
| 1985 | 25 | 10 |
| 1986 | 26 | 37 |
| 1987 | 27 | 50 |
| 1988 | 28 | 25 |
| 1989 | 29 | NC |

==== Team podiums ====
- 1 podium

| No. | Season | Date | Location | Race | Level | Place | Teammates |
|---|---|---|---|---|---|---|---|
| 1 | 1984–85 | 10 March 1985 | Falun, Sweden | 4 × 10 km Relay | World Cup | 3rd | Monsen / T.H. Holte / Mikkelsplass |
