= Iso-Pyhäntä =

- Location within Finland
- Coordinates: 64°28′22″N 28°22′35″E
- Type: Lake
- Basin countries: Finland
- Surface area: 11.564 km^{2} (4.465 sq mi)
- Average depth: 7.17 m (23.5 ft)
- Max. depth: 32 m (105 ft)
- Water volume: 0.0829 km^{3} (67,200 acre⋅ft)
- Shore length^{1}: 56.29 km (34.98 mi)
- Surface elevation: 149.4 m (490 ft)
- Frozen: December–April
- Islands: Ironsaari
- ^{1} Shore length is not a well-defined measure.

Iso-Pyhäntä is a medium-sized lake in northern Finland, 15 km southeast of Ristijärvi settlement. It belongs to the Oulujoki main catchment area. It is located in the Kainuu region.

== See also ==
- List of lakes in Finland
