= Gutta på tur =

Norwegian television series

- Country of origin: Norway
- Original language: Norwegian

Original release
- Network: TV 2
- Release: 21 December 1995 – 2002

Gutta på tur (roughly translates as "The Boys on a Trip") was a Norwegian travel-TV show starring Arne Hjeltnes, Arne Brimi (famous chef), and professional cross-country skiers Vegard Ulvang and Bjørn Dæhlie, the third most winning athlete in the history of the Winter Olympic Games. TV2 started to broadcast the show in 1995. The show got the Gullruten award in the year 2000 for the episode in which they went to Tanzania.
