= 2016 World Masters Orienteering Championships =

World Masters Orienteering Championships (WMOC) are annual international orienteering competitions and the official world championship for orienteering runners above the age of 35.

The WMOC 2016 was arranged 7-13 August 2016 in Estonia.

== Sprint ==
Sprint qualification was held in Tallinn Kadrioru Park, the most outstanding palatial and urban park in Estonia, and sprint finals were held in Tallinn's Old Town. 25 champions were celebrated the first final day 8 August 2016.

MEN M35

Year	Gold	Silver	Bronze	Length and controls
2016	(Belarus) Dmitry Mihalkin	(Russia) Sergey Borovkov	(Belarus) Pavel Krasko	3.54 km, 21 controls

WOMEN W35

Year	Gold	Silver	Bronze	Length and controls
2016	(Russia) Galina Vinogradova	(Finland) Katri Lindeqvist	(Finland) Elli Virta	3.16 km, 19 controls

MEN M40

Year	Gold	Silver	Bronze	Length and controls
2016	(Finland) Petteri Muukkonen	(Sweden) Martin Larsson	(United Kingdom) Nick Barrable	3.46 km, 22 controls

WOMEN W40

Year	Gold	Silver	Bronze	Length and controls
2016	(Sweden) Annika Björk	(Estonia) Kirti Rebane	(Latvia) Irita Pukite	2.99 km, 20 controls

MEN M45

Year	Gold	Silver	Bronze	Length and controls
2016	(Denmark) Thomas Jensen	(Finland) Janne Salmi	(Finland) Tero Heikkilä	3.32 km, 19 controls

WOMEN W45

Year	Gold	Silver	Bronze	Length and controls
2016	(Australia) Natasha Key	(Poland) Anna Gornicka-Antonowicz	(Russia) Natalia Naumova	2.74 km, 17 controls

MEN M50

Year	Gold	Silver	Bronze	Length and controls
2016	(Bulgaria) Tsvetan Todorov	(Germany) Michael Finkenstaedt	(United Kingdom) Clive Hallett	3.16 km, 19 controls

WOMEN W50

Year	Gold	Silver	Bronze	Length and controls
2016	(Estonia) Airi Alnek	(Finland) Anne Nurmi	(Finland) Annamari Vierikko	2.52 km, 17 controls

MEN M55

Year	Gold	Silver	Bronze	Length and controls
2016	(Switzerland) Stefan Bolliger	(Finland) Juhani Jetsonen	(Finland) Kari Lehto	2.99 km, 20 controls

WOMEN W55

Year	Gold	Silver	Bronze	Length and controls
2016	(Estonia) Marje Viirmann	(Sweden) Kane Andersson	(Switzerland) Monika Ammann	2.47 km, 19 controls

MEN M60

Year	Gold	Silver	Bronze	Length and controls
2016	(United Kingdom) James Crawford	(Australia) Geoff Lawford	(Finland) Jorma Nissilä	2.74 km, 17 controls

WOMEN W60

Year	Gold	Silver	Bronze	Length and controls
2016	(Czech Republic) Alena Rosecka	(Norway) Unni Strand Karlsen	(United Kingdom) Alison Simmons	2.10 km, 15 controls

MEN M65

Year	Gold	Silver	Bronze	Length and controls
2016	(Finland) Raimo Hyyryläinen	(Denmark) Keld Johnsen	(Finland) Kai Saksman	2.47 km, 19 controls

WOMEN W65

Year	Gold	Silver	Bronze	Length and controls
2016	(Sweden) Maria Nordwall	(Russia) Tamara Ovsyannikova	(United Kingdom) Liz Godfree	1.90 km, 14 controls

MEN M70

Year	Gold	Silver	Bronze	Length and controls
2016	(Finland) Olli Lehtinen	(Finland) Risto Orpana	(Finland) Timo Peltola	2.08 km, 13 controls

WOMEN W70

Year	Gold	Silver	Bronze	Length and controls
2016	(Norway) Kari Timenes Laugen	(Norway) Torid Kvaal	(Norway) Turid Nystrom	1.74 km, 12 controls

MEN M75

Year	Gold	Silver	Bronze	Length and controls
2016	(Germany) Helmut Conrad	(Norway) Leif Engen	(Japan) Yotaro Ogasawara	1.85 km, 13 controls

WOMEN W75

Year	Gold	Silver	Bronze	Length and controls
2016	(Estonia) Ilse Uus	(Sweden) Birgitta Olsson	(Switzerland) Erica Huggler	1.53 km, 12 controls

MEN M80

Year	Gold	Silver	Bronze	Length and controls
2016	(Czech Republic) Jaroslav Havlik	(Sweden) Rune Carlsson	(Czech Republic) Alois Laznicka	1.53 km, 12 controls

WOMEN W80

Year	Gold	Silver	Bronze	Length and controls
2016	(Sweden) Ebba-Lisa Flygar	(Sweden) Bernice Antonsson	(Switzerland) Anna Barbara Schaffner	1.28 km, 11 controls

MEN M85

Year	Gold	Silver	Bronze	Length and controls
2016	(Japan) Atsushi Takahashi	(Denmark) Peter Larsen	(Spain) Carles Llado	1.28 km, 11 controls

WOMEN W85

Year	Gold	Silver	Bronze	Length and controls
2016	(Switzerland) Vre Harzenmoser	(United Kingdom) Eileen Bedwell	(Finland) Sole Nieminen	1.15 km, 8 controls

MEN M90

Year	Gold	Silver	Bronze	Length and controls
2016	(Finland) Arvo Majoinen	(Switzerland) Adolf Kempf	(Sweden) Bengt Borg	1.04 km, 9 controls

WOMEN W90

Year	Gold	Silver	Bronze	Length and controls
2016	(Sweden) Elvy Fredin	(Sweden) Lena Nordahl		1.04 km, 9 controls

WOMEN W95

Year	Gold	Silver	Bronze	Length and controls
2016	(Sweden) Astrid Andersson			1.04 km, 9 controls

== Long distance ==
Long qualification was held at Kõrvemaa, a wilderness area, dominated by glacial landforms, coniferous forests and extensive bogs, and the long distance final at Pikasaare, with competition centre located in Estonian Defence Forces main military training field, a pine and spruce forest with many features typical of morainic terrain. 24 champions were celebrated the last final day 13 August 2016.

MEN M35

Year	Gold	Silver	Bronze	Length and controls
2016	(Belarus) Dmitry Mihalkin	(Estonia) Andreas Kraas	(Sweden) Jakob Jansson	12.66 km, 22 controls

WOMEN W35

Year	Gold	Silver	Bronze	Length and controls
2016	(Finland) Elli Virta	(Sweden) Rebecka Lindberg	(Finland) Sanna Paukkunen	8.03 km, 15 controls

MEN M40

Year	Gold	Silver	Bronze	Length and controls
2016	(Finland) Petteri Muukkonen	(Finland) Jani Virta	(Finland) Simo Martomaa	11.5 km, 21 controls

WOMEN W40

Year	Gold	Silver	Bronze	Length and controls
2016	(Latvia) Irita Pukite	(Sweden) Annika Björk	(Estonia) Kirti Rebane	7.36 km, 14 controls

MEN M45

Year	Gold	Silver	Bronze	Length and controls
2016	(Sweden) Johan Pettersson	(Sweden) Tommy Lindberg	(Russia) Ilya Gusev	10.51 km, 21 controls

WOMEN W45

Year	Gold	Silver	Bronze	Length and controls
2016	(Australia) Natasha Key	(Russia) Natalia Naumova	(Poland) Anna Gornicka-Antonowicz	6.04 km, 13 controls

MEN M50

Year	Gold	Silver	Bronze	Length and controls
2016	(Italy) Oleg Anuchkin	(Sweden) Hakan Kleijn	(Russia) Alexander Afonyushkin	9.5 km, 20 controls

WOMEN W50

Year	Gold	Silver	Bronze	Length and controls
2016	(Finland) Annika Viilo	(Sweden) Laila B.Höglund	(Sweden) Anita Wehlin	5.56 km, 12 controls

MEN M55

Year	Gold	Silver	Bronze	Length and controls
2016	(Sweden) Hakan Eriksson	(Slovakia) Jozef Pollak	(Sweden) Christer Skoog	7.94 km, 16 controls

WOMEN W55

Year	Gold	Silver	Bronze	Length and controls
2016	(Estonia) Marje Viirmann	(Finland) Sirkka Oikarinen	(Sweden) Kane Andersson	5.31 km, 12 controls

MEN M60

Year	Gold	Silver	Bronze	Length and controls
2016	(Denmark) Rolf Lund	(Finland) Jorma Nissilä	(Russia) Vasilii Mikhailov	7.11 km, 15 controls

WOMEN W60

Year	Gold	Silver	Bronze	Length and controls
2016	(Russia) Lidia Shorokhova	(Latvia) Alida Abola	(Lithuania) Virginija Gvildiene	5.09 km, 10 controls

MEN M65

Year	Gold	Silver	Bronze	Length and controls
2016	(Finland) Tapio Peippo	(Switzerland) Pekka Marti	(Finland) Pekka Kerkola	6.73 km, 13 controls

WOMEN W65

Year	Gold	Silver	Bronze	Length and controls
2016	(Russia) Tamara Ovsyannikova	(Finland) Vappu Hyvärinen	(Sweden) Maria Nordwall	4.75 km, 9 controls

MEN M70

Year	Gold	Silver	Bronze	Length and controls
2016	(Finland) Risto Wessman	(Finland) Heikki Rusko	(Finland) Jorma Hyyryläinen	6.15 km, 14 controls

WOMEN W70

Year	Gold	Silver	Bronze	Length and controls
2016	(Norway) Kari Timenes Laugen	(Russia) Galina Vershinina	(Russia) Tatiana Svistun	4.24 km, 8 controls

MEN M75

Year	Gold	Silver	Bronze	Length and controls
2016	(Germany) Helmut Conrad	(Norway) Gunnar Österbö	(Norway) Anders Taraldrud	5.15 km, 12 controls

WOMEN W75

Year	Gold	Silver	Bronze	Length and controls
2016	(Sweden) Birgitta Olsson	(Sweden) Siv Hasselgrund	(Russia) Liudmila Labutina	3.32 km, 7 controls

MEN M80

Year	Gold	Silver	Bronze	Length and controls
2016	(Sweden) Rune Carlsson	(Finland) Tapio Patana	(Estonia) Heino Mardiste	4.24 km, 9 controls

WOMEN W80

Year	Gold	Silver	Bronze	Length and controls
2016	(Sweden) Ebba-Lisa Flygar	(Sweden) Laila Malmqvist	(Estonia) Tiiu Tiigimägi	2.44 km, 6 controls

MEN M85

Year	Gold	Silver	Bronze	Length and controls
2016	(Finland) Pentti Pelkonen	(Finland) Eero Liski	(Denmark) Palle Bay	3.35 km, 7 controls

WOMEN W85

Year	Gold	Silver	Bronze	Length and controls
2016	(Sweden) Lisa Hedström	(Sweden) Signe Nyman	(Finland) Sole Nieminen	1.49 km, 6 controls

MEN M90

Year	Gold	Silver	Bronze	Length and controls
2016	(Finland) Arvo Majoinen	(Switzerland) Adolf Kempf	(Sweden) Ragnar Hasselquist	2.27 km, 7 controls

WOMEN W95

Year	Gold	Silver	Bronze	Length and controls
2016	(Sweden) Astrid Andersson			1.09 km, 4 controls
