= Kari Härkönen =

Finnish cross-country skier

Personal information
- Nationality: Finland
- Born: 16 July 1959 (age 67) Ristijärvi, Finland

Sport
- Sport: Skiing

World Cup career
- Seasons: 5 – (1982–1986)
- Indiv. starts: 16
- Indiv. podiums: 2
- Indiv. wins: 1
- Team starts: 2
- Team podiums: 1
- Team wins: 0
- Overall titles: 0 – (7th in 1985)
Medal record
Men's cross-country skiing
Representing Finland
World Championships
Gold medal – first place	1985 Seefeld	15 km
Bronze medal – third place	1982 Oslo	4 × 10 km relay

Kari Härkönen (born 16 July 1959) is a Finnish former cross-country skier who competed during the early 1980s. He won two medals at the FIS Nordic World Ski Championships with a gold in the 15 km in 1985 and a bronze in the 4 × 10 km relay (1982, shared with East Germany). He was born in Ristijärvi.

Härkönen also finished 13th in the 15 km event at the 1984 Winter Olympics in Sarajevo.

== Cross-country skiing results ==
All results are sourced from the International Ski Federation (FIS).

=== Olympic Games ===
Year	Age	15 km	30 km	50 km	4 × 10 km relay
1980	20	19	—	—	—
1984	24	13	—	—	—

=== World Championships ===
- 2 medals – (1 gold, 1 bronze)

Year	Age	15 km	30 km	50 km	4 × 10 km relay
1982	22	—	12	—	Bronze
1985	25	Gold	5	4	4
1987	27	28	—	—	—

=== World Cup ===
==== Season standings ====
Season	Age	Overall
1982	22	41
1983	23	41
1984	24	27
1985	25	7
1986	26	NC

==== Individual podiums ====
- 1 victory
- 2 podiums

No.	Season	Date	Location	Race	Level	Place
1	1984–85	9 December 1984	Cogne, Italy	15 km Individual	World Cup	2nd
2	1984–85	22 January 1985	Seefeld, Austria	15 km Individual	World Championships^{[1]}	1st

==== Team podiums ====
- 1 podium

No.	Season	Date	Location	Race	Level	Place	Teammates
1	1981–82	25 February 1982	Oslo, Norway	4 × 10 km Relay	World Championships^{[1]}	3rd	Karvonen / Kirvesniemi / Mieto

Note: ^{1} Until the 1999 World Championships, World Championship races were included in the World Cup scoring system.
