= Yakimets =

Yakimets Якимец
- Settlement
- Location within Vladimir Oblast Location within Russia
- Coordinates: 55°19′N 40°59′E
- Country: Russia
- Region: Vladimir Oblast
- District: Gus-Khrustalny District
- Time zone: UTC+3:00

Yakimets (Russian: Якимец) is a rural locality (a settlement) in Kupreyevskoye Rural Settlement, Gus-Khrustalny District, Vladimir Oblast, Russia. The population was 103 as of 2010.

== Geography ==
Yakimets is located 56 km south of Gus-Khrustalny (the district's administrative centre) by road. Kupreyevo is the nearest rural locality.
