= Arild Monsen =

Norwegian cross-country skier

Personal information
- Nationality: Norway
- Born: 5 April 1962 (age 64) Molde, Norway

Sport
- Sport: Skiing

World Cup career
- Seasons: 7 – (1982–1987, 1989)
- Indiv. starts: 21
- Indiv. podiums: 0
- Team starts: 5
- Team podiums: 4
- Team wins: 2
- Overall titles: 0 – (11th in 1983)
Medal record
Men's cross-country skiing
Representing Norway
World Championships
Gold medal – first place	1985 Seefeld	4 × 10 km relay
Junior World Championships
Gold medal – first place	1981 Schonach	3 × 10 km relay
Silver medal – second place	1981 Schonach	15 km
Silver medal – second place	1982 Murau	3 × 10 km relay

Arild Monsen (born 5 April 1962) is a former Norwegian cross-country skier who competed at international level from 1982 to 1989. He won the 4 × 10 km gold at the 1985 FIS Nordic World Ski Championships in Seefeld and finished seventh in the 15 km event at same championship.

Monsen's best individual career was fourth twice, reaching that mark once in 1983 and another time in 1984.

After retiring from active competition, Monsen has worked as a cross-country coach, in Canada, Sweden and Norway. Since April 2013, he has been the sprint coach for the Norwegian National Men's Cross-Country Skiing Team.

== Cross-country skiing results ==
All results are sourced from the International Ski Federation (FIS).

=== World Championships ===
- 1 medal – (1 gold)

Year	Age	15 km classical	15 km freestyle	30 km	50 km	4 × 10 km relay
1985	22	7	—N/a	—	—	Gold
1987	24	20	—N/a	—	—	—
1989	26	20	—	—	—	4

=== World Cup ===
==== Season standings ====
Season	Age	Overall
1982	19	53
1983	20	11
1984	21	27
1985	22	12
1986	23	41
1987	24	47
1989	26	NC

==== Team podiums ====
- 2 victories
- 4 podiums

No.	Season	Date	Location	Race	Level	Place	Teammates
1	1984–85	24 January 1985	Seefeld, Austria	4 × 10 km Relay	World Championships^{[1]}	1st	Mikkelsplass / T.H. Holte / Aunli
2	1984–85	10 March 1985	Falun, Sweden	4 × 10 km Relay	World Cup	3rd	T.H. Holte / G. Holte / Mikkelsplass
3	1985–86	9 March 1986	Falun, Sweden	4 × 10 km Relay F	World Cup	2nd	Ulvang / Mikkelsplass / Hole
4	1987–88	17 March 1988	Oslo, Norway	4 × 10 km Relay C	World Cup	1st	Mikkelsplass / Bjørn / Ulvang

Note: ^{1} Until the 1999 World Championships, World Championship races were included in the World Cup scoring system.
