= Läsna =

Village in Estonia

Coordinates: 59°26′N 25°54′E

- Village
- Interactive map of Läsna
- Country: Estonia
- County: Lääne-Viru County
- Parish: Kadrina Parish
- Time zone: UTC+2 (EET)
  - Summer (DST): UTC+3 (EEST)

Läsna is a village in Kadrina Parish, Lääne-Viru County, in northeastern Estonia.

In 1977, Pikassaare (Pikasaare) and Reiemäe village was merged with Läsna. Toponym "Pikasaare" is still in use and it is notable for orienteering. For example, the final of 2016 World Masters Orienteering Championships took place there.
