= Frithjof Wilborn =

Norwegian footballer and television presenter (born 1961)

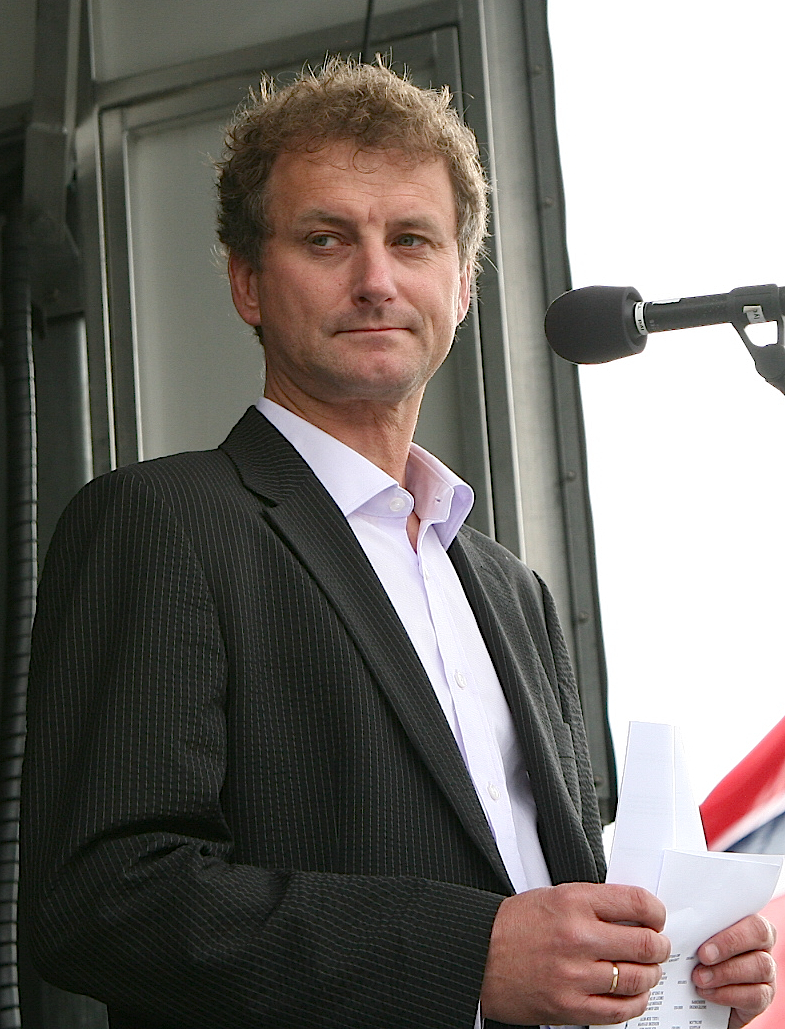
Frithjof Wilborn

Frithjof Wilborn (born 12 November 1961) is a Norwegian footballer and television presenter.

Wilborn played football for Asker, Strømsgodset, Brann and lastly Faaberg. He took teacher's education in Bergen, worked as a teacher in Lillehammer and was a freelance journalist. With experience from Bergensavisen he went to TV 2 in 1995. Here he started working behind the camera, but soon, in 1997, he became sportscaster. He also presented the sports-related programs Mestermøte and Tribunefeber before landing his first major presenting job in 2000, that of Vil du bli millionær?. In 2001, he was awarded the Se og Hør readers' TV personality of the year award. He later presented other shows, such as Farmen, Hvem kan slå Ylvis?, Mine damer og herrer, Jeg gjør hva som helst and Skaperen.

Following financial irregularities he lost his TV 2 job and disappeared from television. He started working as a teacher again, in his native Asker.

Awards
Preceded by Tore Strømøy	Se og Hør's TV Personality of the Year; 2001	Succeeded by Robert Stoltenberg
