= Ristijärvi (village) =

Village in Kainuu, Finland

Ristijärven kirkonkylä
- Municipal centre
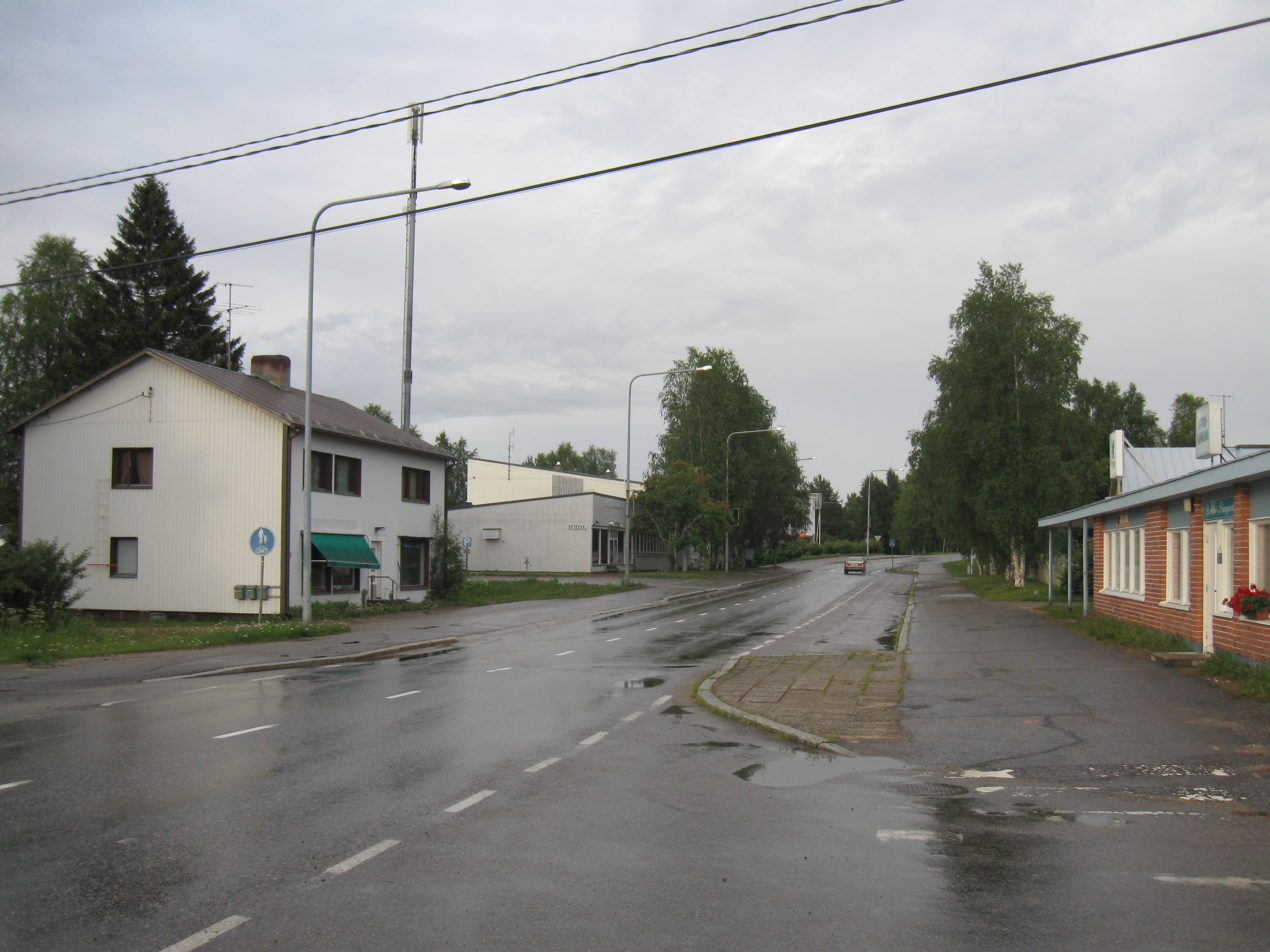
- Aholantie street at the village.

- Location in Finland
- Coordinates: 64°30′18.36″N 28°12′42.37″E
- Country: Finland
- Region: Kainuu
- Municipality: Ristijärvi

Area
  - Total: 2.36 km^{2} (0.91 sq mi)

Population (31 December 2023)
  - Total: 481
  - Density: 2,038/km^{2} (5,280/sq mi)
- Time zone: UTC+2 (EET)
  - Summer (DST): UTC+3 (EEST)
- Postal code: 88400

Ristijärven kirkonkylä (lit. 'Ristijärvi church village') is the administrative center of the Ristijärvi municipality in Kainuu, Finland, and also its only urban area with a population of less than 500. It is located along the Emäjoki River on the Hyrynsalmi route and on the southern shore of Lake Ristijärvi. The distance to Kajaani is about 55 kilometres (34 mi).

The village has a wooden church built in 1807. In addition to the church, the village also has a municipal hall, a library (at the same building), a school, the Virtaala multi-purpose center, and a health center.

== See also ==
- Finnish national road 5 (E63) – highway near the village
