= Liliya Vasilchenko =

Soviet cross-country skier

Personal information
- Nationality: Russia
- Born: 8 July 1962 Novosibirsk, Russian SFSR, Soviet Union
- Died: 17 December 2011 (aged 49) Novosibirsk, Russia

Sport
- Sport: Skiing

World Cup career
- Seasons: 5 – (1982–1986)
- Indiv. starts: 9
- Indiv. podiums: 1
- Indiv. wins: 0
- Team starts: 1
- Team podiums: 1
- Team wins: 1
- Overall titles: 0 – (15th in 1985)
Medal record
Women's cross-country skiing
Representing Soviet Union
World Championships
Gold medal – first place	1985 Seefeld	4 × 5 km relay

Liliya Afanasyevna Vasilchenko (Russian: Ли́лия Афанасьевна Васи́льченко; 8 July 1962 – 17 December 2011) was a Soviet cross-country skier who competed from 1982 to 1986, training at Trudovye Rezervy in Novosibirsk. She won a gold medal in the 4 × 5 km relay at the 1985 FIS Nordic World Ski Championships in Seefeld and finished eight in the 20 km at those same championships. Vasilchenko's best individual finish at the Winter Olympics was 17th in the 5 km event in Sarajevo, in 1984. She was born in Novosibirsk.

== Cross-country skiing results ==
All results are sourced from the International Ski Federation (FIS).

=== Olympic Games ===
Year	Age	5 km	10 km	20 km	4 × 5 km relay
1984	21	17	—	—	—

=== World Championships ===
- 1 medal – (1 gold)

Year	Age	5 km	10 km	20 km	4 × 5 km relay
1985	22	—	11	8	Gold

=== World Cup ===
==== Season standings ====
Season	Age	Overall
1982	19	52
1983	20	42
1984	21	57
1985	22	15
1986	23	33

==== Individual podiums ====
- 1 podium

No.	Season	Date	Location	Race	Level	Place
1	1984–85	13 December 1984	Val di Sole, Italy	5 km Individual	World Cup	3rd

==== Team podiums ====
- 1 victory
- 1 podium

No.	Season	Date	Location	Race	Level	Place	Teammates
1	1984–85	22 January 1985	Seefeld, Austria	4 × 5 km Relay	World Championships^{[1]}	1st	Tikhonova / Smetanina / Reztsova

Note: ^{1} Until the 1999 World Championships, World Championship races were included in the World Cup scoring system.
