= Tore på sporet =

- An early promotional poster of the show and presenter Tore Strømøy
- Genre: Talk show
- Developed by: NRK 1
- Directed by: Harald Eggen
- Presented by: Tore Strømøy
- Country of origin: Norway
- Original languages: English; Norwegian

Original release
- Network: NRK1 (1996 - 2018)
- Release: 1996 – 2018

Tore på sporet is a long running talk show aired in Norway on NRK 1 in several seasons between 1996 and 2018. It is presented by former athlete and journalist Tore Strømøy.

A number of internationally famous people in the English speaking world appeared on the show including Canadian singer Shania Twain and American singer Lynn Anderson. Such interviews were conducted in English.

== Seasons ==
- 1996
- 1997
- 2000
- 2002
- 2006
- 2009
- 2013
- 2016
- 2018
