= Arne Krumsvik =

Norwegian scholar, media entrepreneur, and aviator (born 1966)

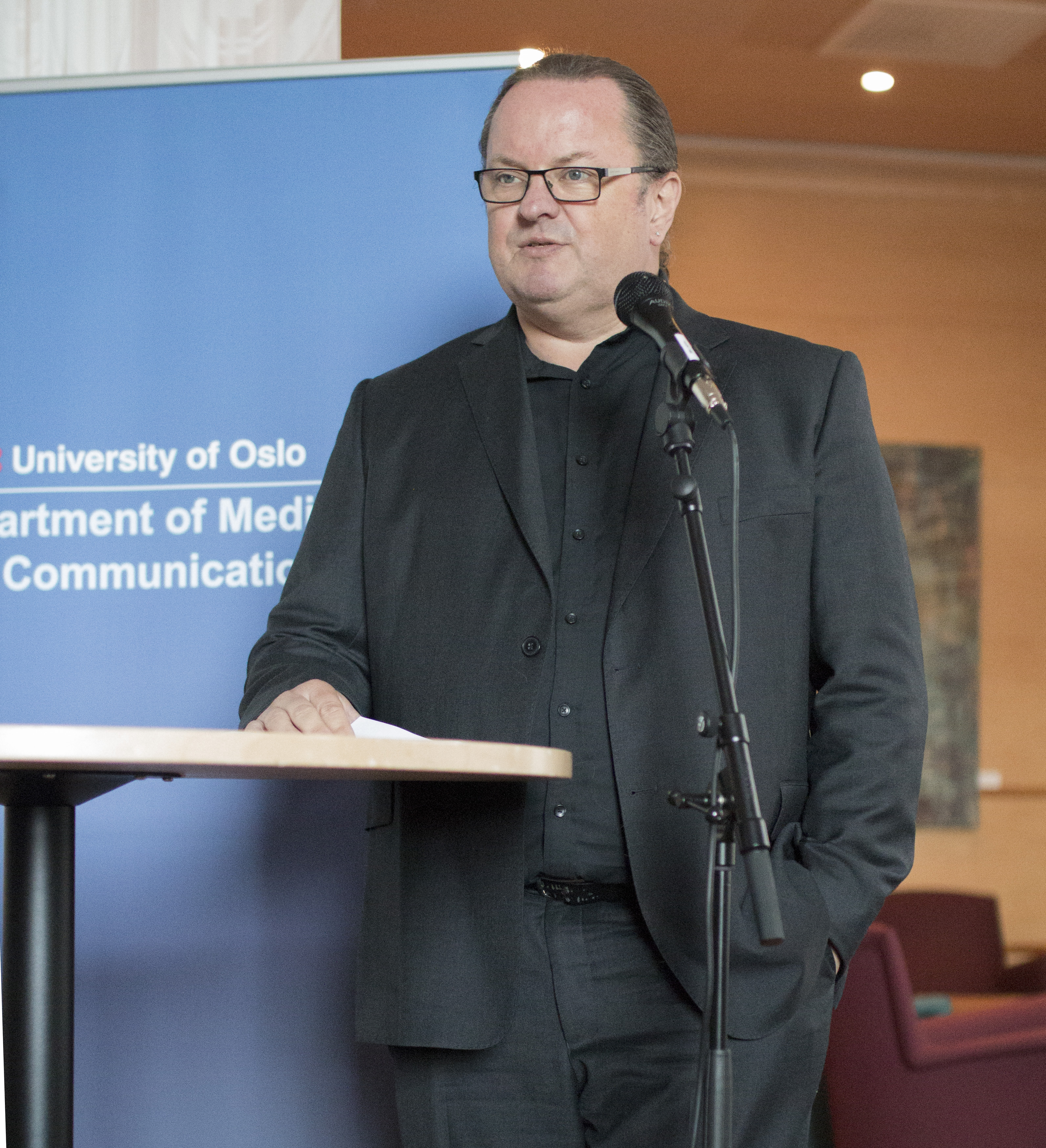
Arne Krumsvik speaking at the 30-year anniversary seminar of the Department of media studies at the University of Oslo.

Arne Håskjold Krumsvik (born 3 October 1966) is a Norwegian scholar, media entrepreneur, and aviator, and considered to be one of the founders of media innovations studies. He is currently the principal of Kristiania University College, previous to that he was the head of department at Department of Media and Communications, University of Oslo, Norway.

== Early career ==
Krumsvik studied journalism at Volda University College in Norway and graduated with a bachelor's degree in 1990. He spent the 1986–1987 academic year as an International Cultural Youth Exchange (ICYE) exchange student in Lincoln, Nebraska, working as a Juvenile Care Specialist at the Jennie B. Harrel Attention Center for Youth. He then went to the BI Norwegian Business School for a Master of Management (1995), and the University of Oslo for a PhD in media studies (2009).

Krumsvik was online editor of Verdens Gang, Norway's largest tabloid newspaper, managing editor at Scandinavia Online, and online publisher at Dagbladet. He was also editor-in-chief of the newspaper Romerikes Blad and founding general manager of Radio Norge.

As a visiting scholar at Georgia Tech in 2005 he did research on CNN.com for his PhD thesis The Online News Factory: A Multi-Lens Investigation of the Strategy, Structure, and Process of Online News Production at CNN and NRK

== Academic positions ==
Krumsvik is currently the principal of Kristiania University College. Previous to that he was head of department at Department of Media and Communications, University of Oslo and professor (on leave) at Oslo Metropolitan University. He is also a founding director of Centre for Interdisciplinary Media Research, adjunct professor at Westerdals Oslo School of Arts, Communication and Technology, and affiliated researcher at the Media Management at Transformation Centre at Jönköping International Business School. He was co-founder of Centre for Research on Media Innovations at the University of Oslo, the International Symposium on Media Innovations, and the Journal of Media Innovations.

== Aviation ==
Krumsvik is a private pilot, a class rating instructor, and has served on the boards of Mission Aviation Fellowship International (MAF), International Fellowship of Flying Rotarians Scandinavia (IFFR), and Aircraft Owners and Pilots Association Norway (AOPA)
