= Torgeir Bjørn =

Norwegian cross-country skier

Personal information
- Nationality: Norway
- Born: 9 March 1964 (age 62) Alvdal Municipality, Norway

Sport
- Sport: Skiing
- Club: Alvdal IL

World Cup career
- Seasons: 7 – (1986–1992)
- Indiv. starts: 11
- Indiv. podiums: 0
- Team starts: 2
- Team podiums: 2
- Team wins: 1
- Overall titles: 0 – (16th in 1990)

Torgeir Bjørn (born 9 March 1964) is a retired Norwegian cross-country skier.

He represented Alvdal IL. He is a son of Kristian Bjørn. He finished eleventh in the 50 km race at the 1988 Winter Olympics. He also had top-ten finishes in the World Cup.

He later became known as a sports commentator for the Norwegian Broadcasting Corporation.

== Cross-country skiing results ==
All results are sourced from the International Ski Federation (FIS).

=== Olympic Games ===
Year	Age	15 km	30 km	50 km	4 × 10 km relay
1988	23	—	—	11	—

=== World Championships ===
Year	Age	10 km	15 km classical	15 km freestyle	30 km	50 km	4 × 10 km relay
1989	24	—N/a	—	27	—	—	—
1991	26	—	—N/a	35	—	—	—

=== Season standings ===
Season	Age	Overall
1986	22	NC
1987	23	50
1988	24	29
1989	25	46
1990	26	16
1991	27	NC
1992	28	NC

==== Team podiums ====
- 1 victory
- 2 podiums

No.	Season	Date	Location	Race	Level	Place	Teammates
1	1987–88	13 March 1988	Falun, Sweden	4 × 10 km Relay F	World Cup	2nd	Dæhlie / Mikkelsplass / Ulvang
2	1987–88	17 March 1988	Oslo, Norway	4 × 10 km Relay C	World Cup	1st	Monsen / Mikkelsplass / Ulvang
