= Tore Strømøy =

Norwegian television presenter and racewalker

Tore Strømøy (born 13 April 1960) is a Norwegian journalist, television presenter and talk show host and former racewalker. He is best known for his talk show Tore på sporet which he hosted for 17 years between 1996 and 2013.

Strømøy qualified for the 50 km racewalk event at the 1980 Summer Olympics, but could never enter the competition as Norway followed US suit and boycotted the games.

== Selected appearances ==
- Go'fot på låven (1992)
- På loffen (1994)
- Tett på (1995) TV Series
- Tore på sporet (1996 - 2006) TV Series
- Ja, vi elsker (1997) TV Series
- Lyden av lørdag (2007)

Awards
Preceded by Hilde Hummelvoll	Se og Hør's TV Personality of the Year; 1996, 1997	Succeeded by Arne Hjeltnes
Preceded by Arne Hjeltnes	Se og Hør's TV Personality of the Year; 2000	Succeeded by Frithjof Wilborn
Preceded by Kristian Ødegaard and Guri Solberg	Se og Hør's TV Personality of the Year; 2009	Succeeded by Kristian Ødegaard and Marthe Sveberg Bjørstad
