= Tor Håkon Holte =

Norwegian cross-country skier

Personal information
- Nationality: Norway
- Born: 1 August 1958 (age 67) Drammen, Norway

Sport
- Sport: Skiing
- Club: Hokksund IL

World Cup career
- Seasons: 7 (1982–1988)
- Indiv. starts: 26
- Indiv. podiums: 7
- Indiv. wins: 2
- Team starts: 3
- Team podiums: 2
- Team wins: 1
- Overall titles: 0 – (2nd in 1985)
Medal record
Men's cross-country skiing
Representing Norway
World Championships
Gold medal – first place	1985 Seefeld	4 × 10 km relay

Tor Håkon Holte (born 1 August 1958) is a Norwegian cross-country skier who competed from 1982 to 1987. He won the 4 × 10 km relay gold at the 1985 FIS Nordic World Ski Championships in Seefeld and finished ninth in the 50 km event at those same championships.

Holte also won the 50 km event at the Holmenkollen ski festival in 1984. His best individual finish at the Winter Olympics was eighth in the 15 km event in 1984.

Holte's only other international victory was a 50 km event in Lahti in 1985.

Holte has four individual Norwegian championships on 50 km and one on 15 km.

He is the brother of Geir Holte, and a nephew of Tove and Torbjørn Paule.

== Cross-country skiing results ==
All results are sourced from the International Ski Federation (FIS).

=== Olympic Games ===
Year	Age	15 km	30 km	50 km	4 × 10 km relay
1984	25	8	—	12	4
1988	29	—	21	31	—

=== World Championships ===
- 1 medal – (1 gold)

Year	Age	15 km	30 km	50 km	4 × 10 km relay
1985	26	—	13	9	Gold

=== World Cup ===
==== Season standings ====
Season	Age	Overall
1982	23	18
1983	24	20
1984	25	4
1985	26	2nd place, silver medalist(s)
1986	27	36
1987	28	38
1988	29	NC

==== Individual podiums ====
- 2 victories
- 7 podiums

No.	Season	Date	Location	Race	Level	Place
1	1981–82	9 January 1982	Reit im Winkl, West Germany	15 km Individual	World Cup	2nd
2	1982–83	18 December 1982	Davos, Switzerland	15 km Individual	World Cup	2nd
3	1983–84	10 March 1984	Oslo, Norway	50 km Individual	World Cup	1st
4	1984–85	15 December 1984	Davos, Switzerland	30 km Individual	World Cup	3rd
5	1984–85	16 February 1985	Aleko, Bulgaria	15 km Individual	World Cup	2nd
6	1984–85	23 February 1985	Syktyvkar, Soviet Union	15 km Individual	World Cup	2nd
7	1984–85	3 March 1985	Lahti, Finland	50 km Individual	World Cup	1st

==== Team podiums ====
- 1 victory
- 2 podiums

No.	Season	Date	Location	Race	Level	Place	Teammates
1	1984–85	24 January 1985	Seefeld, Austria	4 × 10 km Relay	World Championships^{[1]}	1st	Monsen / Mikkelsplass / Aunli
2	1984–85	10 March 1985	Falun, Sweden	4 × 10 km Relay	World Cup	3rd	Monsen / G. Holte / Mikkelsplass

Note: ^{1} Until the 1999 World Championships, World Championship races were included in the World Cup scoring system.
