= Pål Gunnar Mikkelsplass =

Norwegian cross-country skier

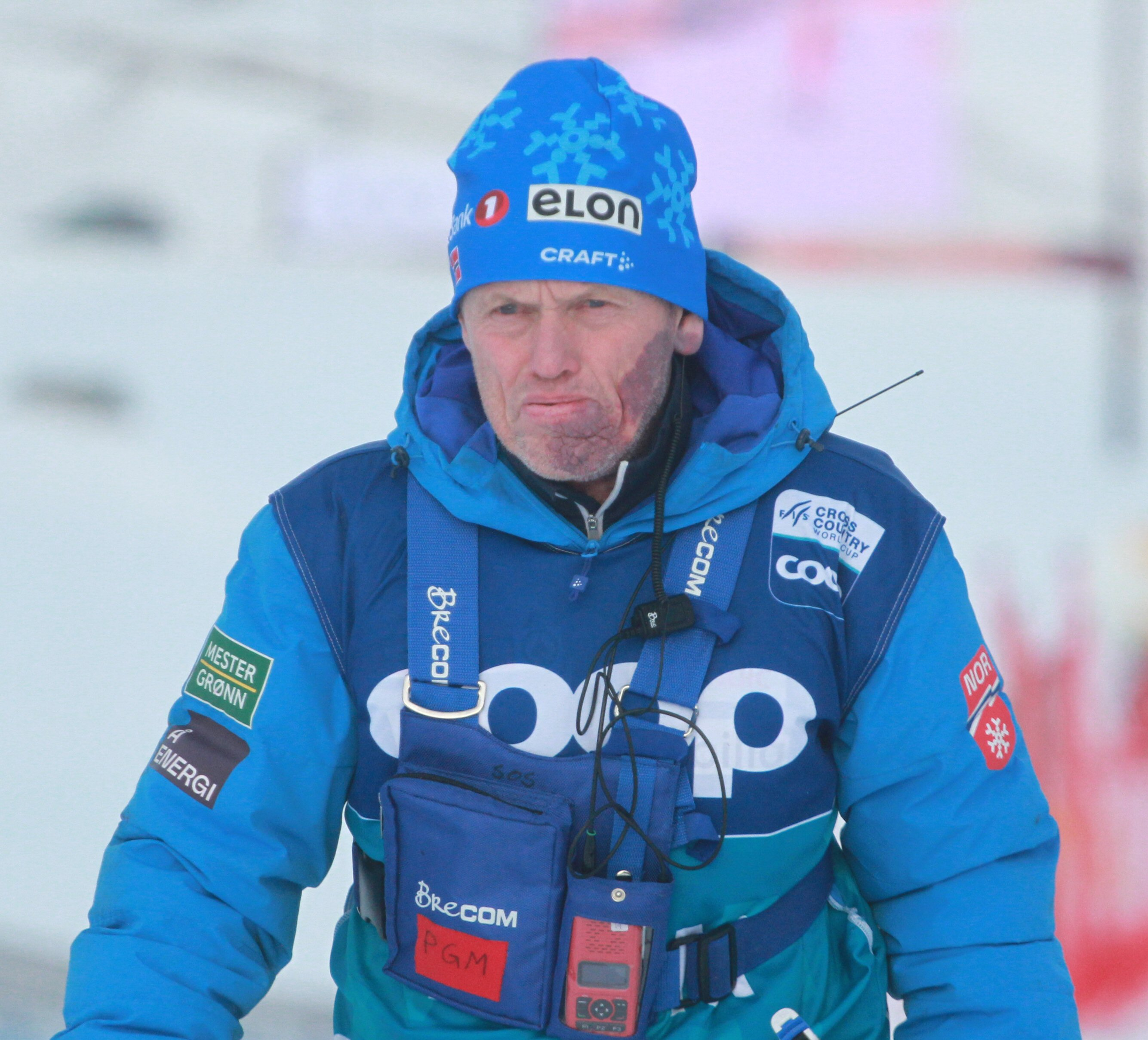

Personal information
- Full name: Pål Gunnar Mikkelsplass
- Nationality: Norway
- Born: 29 April 1961 (age 65) Bromma, Norway
- Spouse: Marit Wold (m. 1994)

Sport
- Sport: Skiing
- Club: Bromma IL

World Cup career
- Seasons: 13 – (1982–1989, 1991–1993, 1995–1996)
- Indiv. starts: 71
- Indiv. podiums: 20
- Indiv. wins: 4
- Team starts: 16
- Team podiums: 11
- Team wins: 3
- Overall titles: 0 – (3rd in 1988)
Medal record
Men's cross-country skiing
Representing Norway
Olympic Games
Silver medal – second place	1988 Calgary	15 km classical
World Championships
Gold medal – first place	1982 Oslo	4 × 10 km relay
Gold medal – first place	1985 Seefeld	4 × 10 km relay
Silver medal – second place	1989 Lahti	15 km classical
Bronze medal – third place	1987 Oberstdorf	4 × 10 km relay
Junior World Championships
Gold medal – first place	1981 Schonach	3 × 5 km relay
Bronze medal – third place	1979 Mont-Sainte-Anne	3 × 5 km relay
Bronze medal – third place	1980 Örnsköldsvik	3 × 5 km relay

Pål Gunnar Mikkelsplass (born 29 April 1961) is a Norwegian former cross-country skier who competed from 1981 to 1997. He won the 15 km silver at the 1988 Winter Olympics in Calgary.

Mikkelsplass also won the 15 km event at the Holmenkollen ski festival in 1981. His best-known successes were at the FIS Nordic World Ski Championships where he won two golds (4 × 10 km relay: 1982, 1985), one silver (15 km: 1989), and one bronze (4 × 10 km relay: 1987).

He married fellow skier Marit Wold in 1994.

== Cross-country skiing results ==
All results are sourced from the International Ski Federation (FIS).

=== Olympic Games ===
- 1 medal – (1 silver)

Year	Age	15 km	30 km	50 km	4 × 10 km relay
1984	22	17	12	—	—
1988	26	Silver	6	9	6

=== World Championships ===
- 4 medals – (2 gold, 1 silver, 1 bronze)

Year	Age	10 km	15 km classical	15 km freestyle	30 km	50 km	4 × 10 km relay
1982	20	—N/a	10	—N/a	—	—	Gold
1985	23	—N/a	11	—N/a	21	14	Gold
1987	25	—N/a	4	—N/a	8	23	Bronze
1989	27	—N/a	Silver	—	10	20	4
1991	29	12	—N/a	—	—	—	—

=== World Cup ===
==== Season standings ====
Season	Age	Overall
1982	20	20
1983	21	6
1984	22	31
1985	23	5
1986	24	4
1987	25	16
1988	26	3rd place, bronze medalist(s)
1989	27	4
1991	29	43
1992	30	21
1993	31	91
1995	33	70

==== Individual podiums ====
- 4 victories
- 20 podiums

No.	Season	Date	Location	Race	Level	Place
1	1981–82	9 January 1982	Reit im Winkl, West Germany	15 km Individual	World Cup	1st
2	1982–83	18 December 1982	Davos, Switzerland	15 km Individual	World Cup	1st
3	1982–83	4 March 1983	Lahti, Finland	15 km Individual	World Cup	2nd
4	1984–85	9 December 1984	Cogne, Italy	15 km Individual	World Cup	1st
5	1984–85	15 December 1984	Davos, Switzerland	30 km Individual	World Cup	2nd
6	1984–85	16 February 1985	Aleko, Bulgaria	15 km Individual	World Cup	3rd
7	1984–85	14 March 1985	Oslo, Norway	15 km Individual	World Cup	3rd
8	1985–86	8 December 1985	Labrador City, Canada	15 km Individual C	World Cup	3rd
9	1986–87	14 March 1987	Kavgolovo, Soviet Union	15 km Individual C	World Cup	3rd
10	1987–88	12 December 1987	La Clusaz, France	15 km Individual F	World Cup	3rd
11	1987–88	19 December 1987	Davos, Switzerland	15 km Individual C	World Cup	2nd
12	1987–88	19 February 1988	Calgary, Canada	15 km Individual C	Olympic Games^{[1]}	2nd
13	1987–88	27 March 1988	Rovaniemi, Finland	50 km Individual C	World Cup	1st
14	1988–89	14 December 1988	(Socialist Federal Republic of Yugoslavia) Bohinj, Yugoslavia	30 km Individual F	World Cup	3rd
15	1988–89	17 December 1988	Val di Sole, Italy	15 km Individual F	World Cup	3rd
16	1988–89	7 January 1989	Kavgolovo, Soviet Union	15 km Individual C	World Cup	2nd
17	1988–89	13 January 1989	Nové Město, Czechoslovakia	15 km Individual F	World Cup	2nd
18	1988–89	15 January 1989	Nové Město, Czechoslovakia	30 km Individual C	World Cup	2nd
19	1988–89	22 February 1989	Lahti, Finland	15 km Individual C	World Championships^{[1]}	2nd
20	1991–92	29 February 1992	Lahti, Finland	15 km Individual C	World Cup	3rd

==== Team podiums ====
- 3 victories
- 11 podiums

No.	Season	Date	Location	Race	Level	Place	Teammates
1	1981–82	25 January 1982	Oslo, Norway	4 × 10 km Relay	World Championships^{[1]}	1st	Eriksen / Aunli / Brå
2	1984–85	24 January 1985	Seefeld, Austria	4 × 10 km Relay	World Championships^{[1]}	1st	Monsen / T.H. Holte / Aunli
3	1984–85	10 March 1985	Falun, Sweden	4 × 10 km Relay	World Cup	3rd	Monsen / T.H. Holte / G. Holte
4	1984–85	17 March 1985	Oslo, Norway	4 × 10 km Relay	World Cup	3rd	Hole / Ulvang / Aunli
5	1985–86	9 March 1986	Falun, Sweden	4 × 10 km Relay F	World Cup	2nd	Monsen / Ulvang / Hole
6	1986–87	17 February 1987	Oberstdorf, West Germany	4 × 10 km Relay F	World Championships^{[1]}	3rd	Aunli / Ulvang / Langli
7	1986–87	8 March 1987	Falun, Sweden	4 × 10 km Relay C	World Cup	3rd	Ulvang / Aunli / Langli
8	1987–88	13 March 1988	Falun, Sweden	4 × 10 km Relay F	World Cup	2nd	Dæhlie / Bjørn / Ulvang
9	1987–88	17 March 1988	Oslo, Norway	4 × 10 km Relay C	World Cup	1st	Monsen / Bjørn / Ulvang
10	1988–89	5 March 1989	Oslo, Norway	4 × 10 km Relay F	World Cup	3rd	Dæhlie / Ulvang / Langli
11	1988–89	12 March 1989	Falun, Sweden	4 × 10 km Relay C	World Cup	3rd	Langli / Ulvang / Dæhlie

Note: ^{1} Until the 1999 World Championships and the 1994 Olympics, World Championship and Olympic races were included in the World Cup scoring system.
