= Vegard Ulvang =

Norwegian cross-country skier

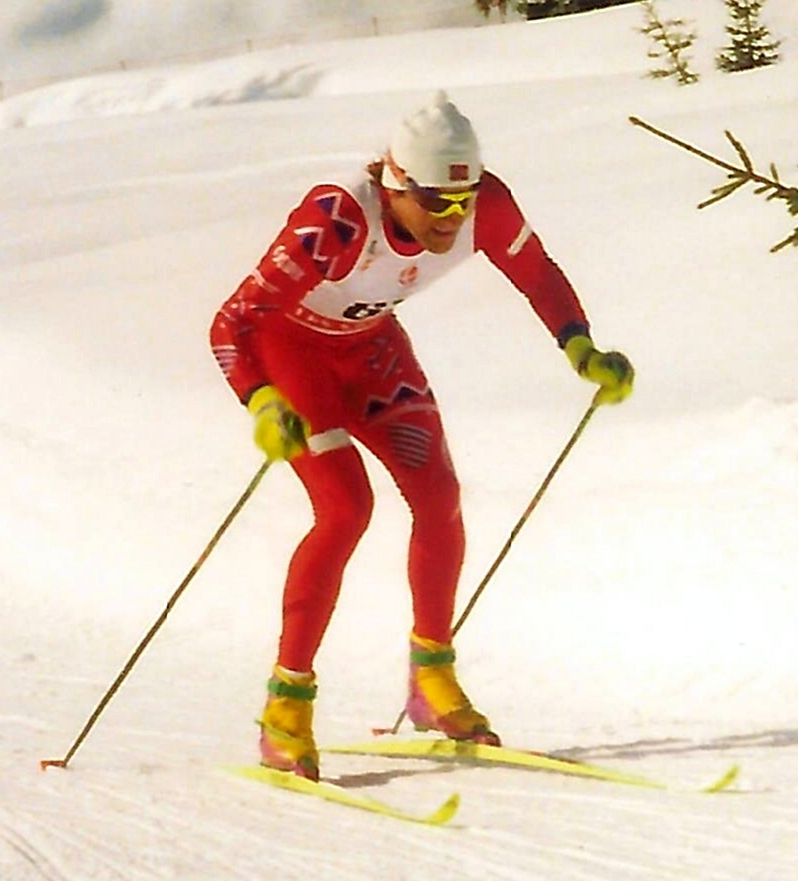
- Ulvang during the 1992 Winter Olympics in Albertville, France

Personal information
- Born: 10 October 1963 (age 63) Kirkenes, Norway
- Height: 180 cm (5 ft 11 in)
- Spouse: Grete Ingeborg Nykkelmo

Sport
- Sport: Skiing
- Club: Kirkenes & Omegn Skiklubb

World Cup career
- Seasons: 14 – (1984–1997)
- Indiv. starts: 120
- Indiv. podiums: 34
- Indiv. wins: 9
- Team starts: 29
- Team podiums: 23
- Team wins: 9
- Overall titles: 1 – (1990)
Medal record
Men's cross-country skiing
Representing Norway
Olympic Games
Gold medal – first place	1992 Albertville	10 km classical
Gold medal – first place	1992 Albertville	30 km classical
Gold medal – first place	1992 Albertville	4 × 10 km relay
Silver medal – second place	1992 Albertville	10 km + 15 km combined pursuit
Silver medal – second place	1994 Lillehammer	4 × 10 km relay
Bronze medal – third place	1988 Calgary	30 km classical
World Championships
Gold medal – first place	1991 Val di Fiemme	4 × 10 km relay
Gold medal – first place	1993 Falun	4 × 10 km relay
Silver medal – second place	1989 Lahti	30 km classical
Silver medal – second place	1993 Falun	30 km classical
Bronze medal – third place	1987 Oberstdorf	4 × 10 km relay
Bronze medal – third place	1989 Lahti	15 km classical
Bronze medal – third place	1991 Val di Fiemme	30 km classical
Bronze medal – third place	1993 Falun	10 km classical
Junior World Championships
Silver medal – second place	1982 Murau	3 × 5 km relay
Silver medal – second place	1983 Kuopio	3 × 5 km relay

Vegard Ulvang (born 10 October 1963) is a retired Norwegian cross-country skier who won three Olympic gold medals, two silver, and one bronze. At the opening ceremony of the 1994 Winter Olympic Games, he took the ceremonial Olympic Oath on part of all the athletes. In addition to his Olympic achievements, he received the Holmenkollen medal in 1991 (shared with Trond Einar Elden, Ernst Vettori, and Jens Weißflog), and won the World Cup in 1990. He has also won nine gold, six silver, and two bronze medals in the Norwegian Championships. He earned nine World Cup race victories. Ulvang also won the 50 km at the Holmenkollen ski festival in 1989, 1991 and 1992.

After retiring from professional skiing, he started his own clothing line.

On 25 May 2006, Ulvang was named chairman of the executive board of the International Ski Federation's (FIS) cross-country committee, taking over from Peter Petriček of Slovenia, who decided to step down after four years in the job.

Ulvang was also a part of Norwegian TV 2's television travel-series Gutta på tur, together with fellow skier Bjørn Dæhlie, TV personality Arne Hjeltnes and chef Arne Brimi. He is also the creator and organizer of the Tour de Ski.

== Cross-country skiing results ==
All results are sourced from the International Ski Federation (FIS).

=== Olympic Games ===
- 6 medals – (3 gold, 2 silver, 1 bronze)

Year	Age	10 km	15 km	Pursuit	30 km	50 km	4 × 10 km relay
1988	24	—N/a	7	—N/a	Bronze	4	6
1992	28	Gold	—N/a	Silver	Gold	9	Gold
1994	30	7	—N/a	DNS	—	10	Silver

=== World Championships ===
- 8 medals – (2 gold, 2 silver, 4 bronze)

Year	Age	10 km	15 km classical	15 km freestyle	Pursuit	30 km	50 km	4 × 10 km relay
1987	23	—N/a	6	—N/a	—N/a	5	7	Bronze
1989	25	—N/a	Bronze	—	—N/a	Silver	DNF	4
1991	27	4	—N/a	—	—N/a	Bronze	16	Gold
1993	29	Bronze	—N/a	—N/a	4	Silver	5	Gold
1995	31	12	—N/a	—N/a	DNF	8	—	—

=== World Cup ===
==== Season titles ====
- 1 title – (1 overall)

Season
Season	Discipline
1990	Overall

==== Season standings ====
Season	Age			
Season	Age	Overall	Long Distance	Sprint
1984	20	38	—N/a	—N/a
1985	21	46	—N/a	—N/a
1986	22	8	—N/a	—N/a
1987	23	4	—N/a	—N/a
1988	24	92	—N/a	—N/a
1989	25	2nd place, silver medalist(s)	—N/a	—N/a
1990	26	1st place, gold medalist(s)	—N/a	—N/a
1991	27	3rd place, bronze medalist(s)	—N/a	—N/a
1992	28	2nd place, silver medalist(s)	—N/a	—N/a
1993	29	3rd place, bronze medalist(s)	—N/a	—N/a
1994	30	6	—N/a	—N/a
1995	31	16	—N/a	—N/a
1996	32	12	—N/a	—N/a
1997	33	31	19	45

==== Individual podiums ====
- 9 victories
- 34 podiums

No.	Season	Date	Location	Race	Level	Place
1	1985–86	15 January 1986	(Socialist Federal Republic of Yugoslavia) Bohinj, Yugoslavia	5 km Individual F	World Cup	3rd
2	1985–86	14 March 1986	Oslo, Norway	50 km Individual C	World Cup	3rd
3	1986–87	10 December 1986	Ramsau, Austria	15 km Individual F	World Cup	3rd
4	1986–87	14 March 1987	Kavgolovo, Soviet Union	15 km Individual C	World Cup	2nd
5	1987–88	15 February 1988	Calgary, Canada	30 km Individual C	Olympic Games^{[1]}	3rd
6	1988–89	7 January 1989	Kavgolovo, Soviet Union	15 km Individual C	World Cup	1st
7	1988–89	13 January 1989	Nové Město, Czechoslovakia	15 km Individual F	World Cup	3rd
8	1988–89	15 January 1989	Nové Město, Czechoslovakia	30 km Individual C	World Cup	3rd
9	1988–89	18 February 1989	Lahti, Finland	30 km Individual C	World Championships^{[1]}	2nd
10	1988–89	22 February 1989	Lahti, Finland	15 km Individual C	World Championships^{[1]}	3rd
11	1988–89	4 March 1989	Oslo, Norway	50 km Individual C	World Cup	1st
12	1988–89	11 March 1989	Falun, Sweden	30 km Individual F	World Cup	3rd
13	1989–90	9 December 1989	Soldier Hollow, United States	15 km Individual C	World Cup	2nd
14	1989–90	13 January 1990	Moscow, Soviet Union	30 km Individual F	World Cup	2nd
15	1989–90	17 February 1990	Campra, Switzerland	15 km Individual F	World Cup	2nd
16	1989–90	21 February 1990	Val di Fiemme, Italy	30 km Individual C	World Cup	2nd
17	1989–90	4 March 1990	Lahti, Finland	15 km + 15 km Pursuit F/C	World Cup	2nd
18	1990–91	7 February 1991	Val di Fiemme, Italy	30 km Individual C	World Championships^{[1]}	3rd
19	1990–91	16 March 1991	Oslo, Norway	50 km Individual C	World Cup	1st
20	1991–92	7 December 1991	Silver Star, Canada	10 km Individual C	World Cup	1st
21	1991–92	8 December 1991	Silver Star, Canada	15 km Pursuit C	World Cup	1st
22	1991–92	14 December 1991	Thunder Bay, Canada	30 km Individual F	World Cup	2nd
23	1991–92	4 January 1992	Kavgolovo, Russia	30 km Individual C	World Cup	2nd
24	1991–92	10 February 1992	Albertville, France	30 km Individual C	Olympic Games^{[1]}	1st
25	1991–92	13 February 1992	Albertville, France	10 km Individual C	Olympic Games^{[1]}	1st
26	1991–92	15 February 1992	Albertville, France	15 km Pursuit F	Olympic Games^{[1]}	2nd
27	1991–92	29 February 1992	Lahti, Finland	15 km Individual C	World Cup	2nd
28	1991–92	14 March 1992	Vang, Norway	50 km Individual C	World Cup	1st
29	1992–93	12 December 1992	Ramsau, Austria	10 km Individual F	World Cup	1st
30	1992–93	13 December 1992	Ramsau, Austria	15 km Pursuit C	World Cup	2nd
31	1992–93	20 February 1993	Ulrichen, Switzerland	15 km Individual C	World Cup	2nd
32	1992–93	20 February 1993	Falun, Sweden	30 km Individual C	World Championships^{[1]}	2nd
33	1992–93	22 February 1993	Falun, Sweden	10 km Individual C	World Championships^{[1]}	3rd
34	1993–94	18 December 1993	Davos, Switzerland	15 km Individual F	World Cup	2nd

==== Team podiums ====
- 9 victories
- 23 podiums

No.	Season	Date	Location	Race	Level	Place	Teammates
1	1984–85	17 March 1985	Oslo, Norway	4 × 10 km Relay	World Cup	3rd	Hole / Mikkelsplass / Aunli
2	1985–86	9 March 1986	Falun, Sweden	4 × 10 km Relay F	World Cup	2nd	Monsen / Mikkelsplass / Hole
3	1986–87	17 February 1987	Oberstdorf, West Germany	4 × 10 km Relay F	World Championships^{[1]}	3rd	Aunli / Mikkelsplass / Langli
4	1986–87	8 March 1987	Falun, Sweden	4 × 10 km Relay C	World Cup	3rd	Mikkelsplass / Aunli / Langli
5	1987–88	13 March 1988	Falun, Sweden	4 × 10 km Relay F	World Cup	2nd	Dæhlie / Bjørn / Mikkelsplass
6	1987–88	17 March 1988	Oslo, Norway	4 × 10 km Relay C	World Cup	1st	Monsen / Mikkelsplass / Bjørn
7	1988–89	5 March 1989	Oslo, Norway	4 × 10 km Relay F	World Cup	3rd	Mikkelsplass / Dæhlie / Langli
8	1988–89	12 March 1989	Falun, Sweden	4 × 10 km Relay C	World Cup	3rd	Langli / Mikkelsplass / Dæhlie
9	1989–90	11 March 1990	Örnsköldsvik, Sweden	4 × 10 km Relay C/F	World Cup	2nd	Skaanes / Sivertsen / Langli
10	1989–90	16 March 1990	Vang, Norway	4 × 10 km Relay C	World Cup	1st	Skinstad / Langli / Skaanes
11	1990–91	15 February 1991	Val di Fiemme, Italy	4 × 10 km Relay C/F	World Championships^{[1]}	1st	Skaanes / Langli / Dæhlie
12	1991–92	18 February 1992	Albertville, France	4 × 10 km Relay C/F	Olympic Games^{[1]}	1st	Langli / Skjeldal / Dæhlie
13	1991–92	28 February 1992	Lahti, Finland	4 × 10 km Relay F	World Cup	2nd	Langli / Dæhlie / Skjeldal
14	1991–92	8 March 1992	Funäsdalen, Sweden	4 × 10 km Relay C	World Cup	1st	Sivertsen / Langli / Dæhlie
15	1992–93	26 February 1993	Falun, Sweden	4 × 10 km Relay C/F	World Championships^{[1]}	1st	Sivertsen / Langli / Dæhlie
16	1993–94	22 February 1994	Lillehammer, Norway	4 × 10 km Relay C/F	Olympic Games^{[1]}	2nd	Sivertsen / Alsgaard / Dæhlie
17	1993–94	13 March 1994	Falun, Sweden	4 × 10 km Relay F	World Cup	1st	Sivertsen / Jevne / Dæhlie
18	1994–95	26 March 1995	Sapporo, Japan	4 × 10 km Relay C/F	World Cup	1st	Dæhlie / Skjeldal / Alsgaard
19	1995–96	14 January 1996	Nové Město, Czech Republic	4 × 10 km Relay C	World Cup	2nd	Alsgaard / Jevne / Dæhlie
20	1995–96	25 February 1996	Trondheim, Norway	4 × 10 km Relay C/F	World Cup	1st	Jevne / Dæhlie / Alsgaard
21	1995–96	17 March 1996	Oslo, Norway	4 × 5 km Relay F	World Cup	2nd	Kristiansen / Eide / Dæhlie
22	1996–97	24 November 1996	Kiruna, Sweden	4 × 10 km Relay C	World Cup	3rd	Skjeldal / Eide / Dæhlie
23	1996–97	8 December 1996	Davos, Switzerland	4 × 10 km Relay C	World Cup	3rd	Skjeldal / Eide / Sivertsen

Note: ^{1} Until the 1999 World Championships and the 1994 Olympics, World Championship and Olympic races were included in the World Cup scoring system.
