= Frank Sauerbrey =

East German ski jumper

Medal record

Men's ski jumping

Representing East Germany

World Championships
| Bronze medal – third place | 1985 Seefeld | Team large hill |

Frank Sauerbrey is an East German former ski jumper who competed from 1984 to 1986. He also won a bronze medal in the team large hill competition at the 1985 FIS Nordic World Ski Championships in Seefeld.

Sauerbrey's best individual finish was 10th in a large hill event at Innsbruck in 1985.
