= Harald Rønneberg =

Norwegian television personality (born 1973)

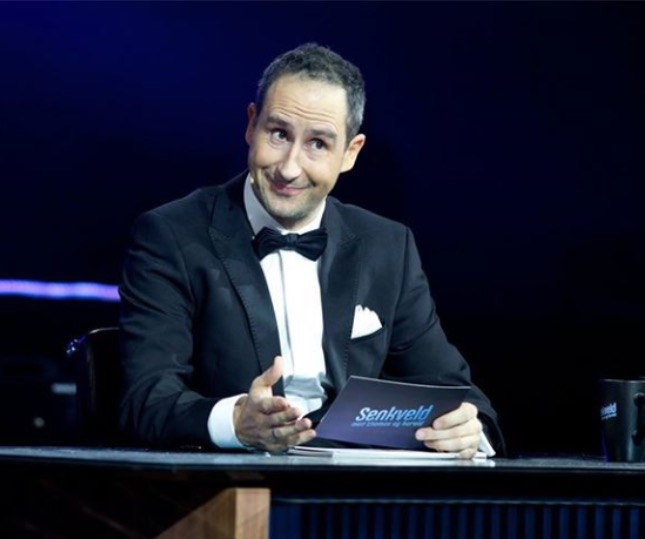
Harald during Senkveld's 10th anniversary in Oslo Spectrum, November 8, 2013

Harald Johnstein Rønneberg (born 11 August 1973) is a Norwegian television personality.

He was born in Halden, and is an economist by education. He worked in the Norwegian Broadcasting Corporation in the early 2000s before switching to TV 2 in 2002. Together with Thomas Numme he hosted the first season of Idol in 2003, and then the Friday night show Senkveld. The duo has also hosted the Spellemannprisen award show.

For his work in Senkveld, Rønneberg received Gullruten awards in 2004 and 2006. In both 2006 and 2007 Rønneberg and Numme were awarded the Se og Hør readers' TV personality of the year award. In 2018, the both of them won the "Honorary Prize" at Gullruten.

Awards
Preceded by Erik Thorstvedt	Se og Hør's TV Personality of the Year; 2006, 2007 (together with Thomas Numme)	Succeeded by Kristian Ødegaard and Guri Solberg
