= Seefood TV =

Norwegian production company for television and film

Seefood TV is a Norwegian production company for television and film. Seefood produce for the Norwegian broadcasters TV2, TVNorge and NRK. The company was founded in 2001 by Kristian Ødegård and Espen Eckbo and their first production was the reality parody Santas In A Barn. Aleksander Herresthal joined the company as a partner and CEO in 2007 and is working today as Chief Creative Officer. The company has produced several award-winning and critically acclaimed comedy series for television. Their productions have been nominated for a total of 46 Gullruten awards (Norwegian Emmy) and have won 8 Norwegian Comedy Awards.

== Productions ==
- Superhero Academy, comedy drama NRK 2020-
- Granddad, comedy drama TV2 2020-
- Celebrity Task Force, reality show / entertainment TV2 2020-
- Jul i Blodfjell 2, comedy crime drama Discovery Networks (Norway) 2019
- It could have been worse, comedy drama Discovery Networks (Norway) 2018-
- Couples Therapy, comedy drama NRK 2017-
- Jul i Blodfjell, comedy crime drama Discovery Networks (Norway) 2017
- Kongsvikfamiliene, comedy drama Discovery Networks (Norway) 2018
- Hit for hit, comedy drama NRK 2017
- Kongsvik-klinikken, comedy drama Discovery Networks (Norway) 2017
- Narvestad på ferie, comedy drama NRK 2016
- Best før, comedy drama TV2 2015-
- Mellom bakkar og berg, comedy drama TVNorge 2015
- The Know Show, entertainment, quiz TV2 2015-
- Kollektivet, comedy show TV2 2010–2016
- Klovn til kaffen, entertainment TV2 2015–2017
- Costa del Kongsvik, comedy drama TVN 2012–2014
- På tur med Dag Otto, entertainment TV2 2013–2017
- Asbjørn Brekke show, comedy talkshow TVN 2012–2016
- Kongsvik videregående, comedy drama TVN 2012
- Nissene over skog og hei, comedy drama TVN 2011
- Kongsvik Ungedomsskole, comedy drama TVN 2011
- På hjul med Dag Otto, entertainment TV2 2010
- Tett på Tre, comedy drama TV 2 2008
- Santas In A Barn, comedy series TVNorge 2001
- På klozz hold, comedy series TVNorge 2002
- Tonight with Timothy Dahle, comedy talkshow TV2 2003
- TV2-nøttene, comedy quiz TV2 2004–2008
- Jul i Tøyengata, comedy drama TVNorge 2006
- Best of Espen Eckbo, comedy show TV2 2007
- Lille Nøtteaften, comedy show TV2 2006, 2007 og 2008
- Det var en gang et eventyr, drama series NRK 2008
- Three Through One, comedy drama TV2 2008
- På hjul med Dag Otto, entertainment TV2 2010
- Kolonihagen, entertainment TV2 2010
- Påpp & Råkk, comedy drama NRK 2010
