= Arne Hjeltnes =

Norwegian writer and television personality

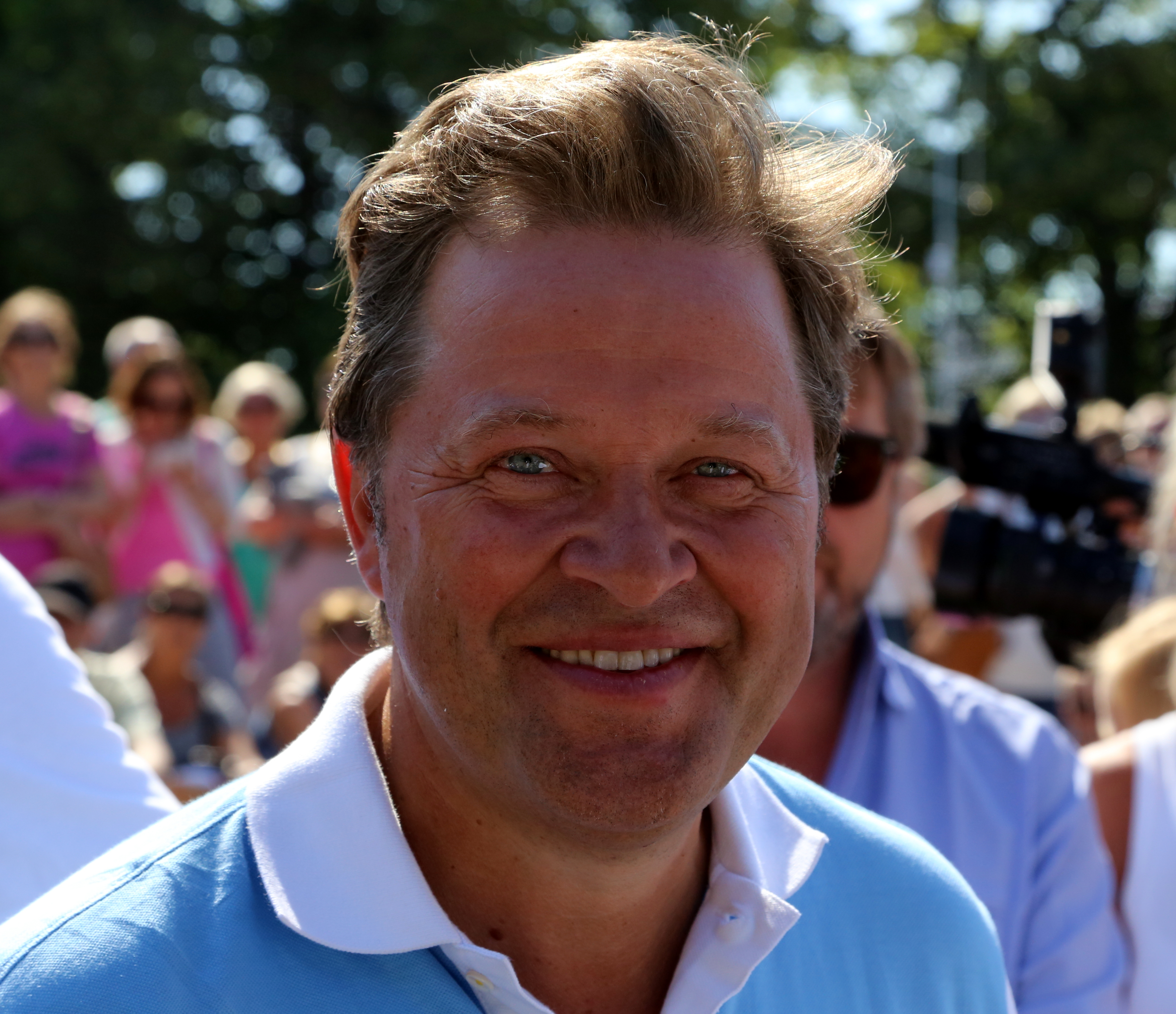
- Arne Hjeltnes at Gladmat 2014
- Born: August 9, 1963 (age 63); Kristiansand, Norway
- Occupations: Television personality, writer
- Spouse: Cathrine Gehrken
- Children: 3
- Writing career
- Genres: Food, nonfiction, travel

Arne Hjeltnes (born August 9, 1963) is a Norwegian writer, television personality, marketer and politician.

== Biography ==
Hjeltnes was born in Kristiansand, but grew up in Voss Municipality. He first moved to Bærum Municipality in 1982 to attend the BI Norwegian Business School, but did not complete his siv.øk. studies. He completed his compulsory military service at the Allied Forces Northern Europe in Kolsås. He was hired as a market consultant in the Norwegian Savings Banks Association, then worked in a marketing agency before he started to work in television. He played Ærlege Arne (Honest Arne) in the Norwegian Broadcasting Corporation show Hotell in 1990. In 1992 he was hired by TV 2. In the mid-1990s he was a presenter for the Norwegian Broadcasting Corporation radio show Herreavdelingen for a short time.

He made his literary debut in 1993 with the poetry collection Den sumaren eg fylte diesel (lit. transl. "The Summer I Filled Up with Diesel"). He later made his way as a humorist. The books Arne Hjeltnes ser på 549 TV-heltar and Når skaldyret vaknar followed in 1994 and 1995. In 1996 came Den vanvittige korte veien til rikdom og suksess (lit. transl. "The crazy short road to wealth and success"), written with Roger Nielman.

In 1996 he made his breakthrough on television as the host of the TV 2 travel show Gutta på tur, together with chef Arne Brimi and skiers Vegard Ulvang and Bjørn Dæhlie. For his work on Gutta på tur, Hjeltnes received Gullruten awards in 1998 and 2000. In both 1998 and 1999 he was awarded the Se og Hør readers' TV Personality of the Year Award.

Brimi and Hjeltnes published the book Gutta på tur (lit. transl. "The boys on a trip") in 1997. They had previously published the book Utan mat og drikke. Offisiell kokebok for langrennslandslaget (lit. transl. "Without food and drink: The official cookbook for the national cross-country team") in 1995, and a new Gutta på tur book followed in 1999. Later books include Guttas greatest (2001) and Guttas villmark (2002). He wrote several other books about hiking and traveling. Hjeltnes also wrote documentary books such as Thor Heyerdahl og papirbåten som forandret verden (lit. transl. "Thor Heyerdahl and the paper boat that changed the world"; 1999), Mysterier fra fortiden. Arkeologiske gåter fra hele verden (lit. transl. "Mysteries from the past: Archaeological puzzles from around the world"; 2001) and Yst! Ei reise blant folk og ost i Norge (lit. transl. "Cheese! A journey among people and cheese in Norway"; 2003). In 2010 he published the novel Ivar Nimme.

After Gutta på tur he had a professional career in other fields. From 2003 to 2005 he worked with promoting Norwegian salmon to the Hong Kong market, and then in New York City for Innovation Norway. He then worked in marketing for Marine Harvest for two years before becoming CEO of the marketing company Creuna (from "Creating Unique Net Advantages") in 2008. He also appears on television from time to time. In 2010 he appeared in the Norwegian Broadcasting Corporation documentary series Vår ære og vår makt about Norwegian shipping history. He is also a sporadic columnist in Budstikka.

== Personal life ==
Hjeltnes lives in Snarøya in Bærum Municipality together with former television host Cathrine Gehrken and their three daughters. He chaired the Young Conservatives in Voss in his youth, and in 2010 he became a central board member of the Conservative Party. His wife is a municipal politician for the Conservatives.

Awards
| Preceded by Tore Strømøy | Se og Hør's TV Personality of the Year; 1998, 1999 | Succeeded by Tore Strømøy |
