= Jyri Pelkonen =

Finnish Nordic combined skier

Medal record

Men's Nordic combined

World Championships
Bronze medal – third place	1985 Seefeld	3 x 10 km team

Jyri Pelkonen (born 21 December 1965) is a Finnish former Nordic combined skier who competed during the late 1980s. He won a bronze medal in the 3 x 10 km team event at the 1985 FIS Nordic World Ski Championships in Seefeld.

Pelkonen's best individual finish was 3rd in Switzerland in 1985.
