= Arne Brimi =

Norwegian chef and food writer

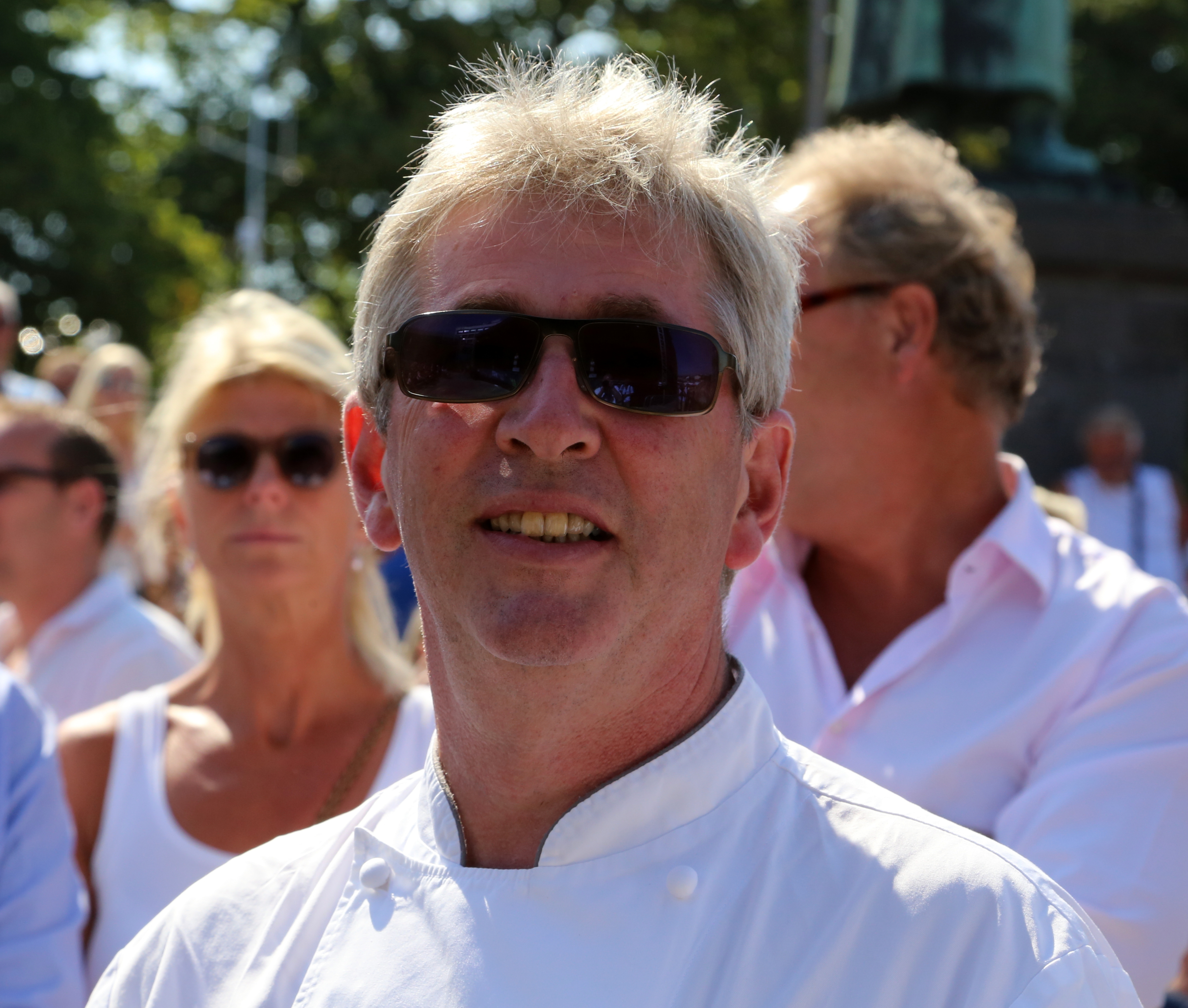
Arne Brimi at Gladmat 2014

Arne Olav Brimi (born 1 October 1957), is a famous Norwegian chef and food writer. He is also known for his appearance on the TV-series "Gutta på tur" ("The Boys on Tour") with Olympic gold medalists Vegard Ulvang, Bjørn Dæhlie, and host Arne Hjeltnes. Brimi lives in Vågå in Ottadalen, where he built a restaurant in the wild for closed parties. This restaurant is not accessible by car; the last few hundred meters to the restaurant must be traveled by foot.
