= Kristian Ødegård =

Norwegian television personality (born 1974)

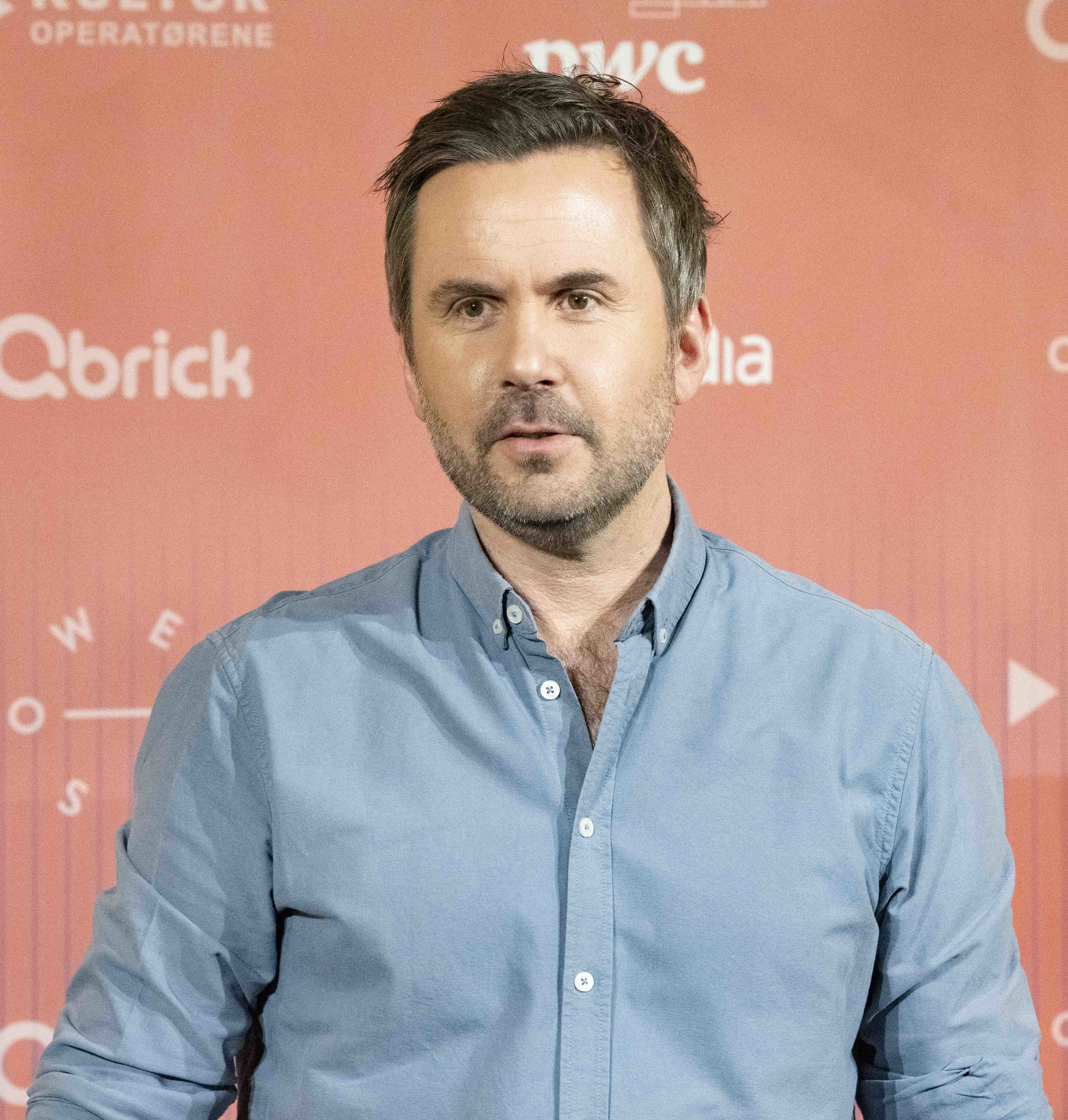
Kristian Ødegård, 2021

Kristian Ødegård (born 12 April 1974) is a Norwegian television personality and comedian.

He contributed to the film Get Ready to be Boyzvoiced in 2000, and later cooperated with Espen Eckbo and/or Henrik Elvestad in the mock reality show Nissene på låven (2001), the mock game show TV 2-nøttene and the mock talk show Tonight med Timothy Dale. Ødegaard presented Nissene på låven and TV 2-nøttene, the latter as a parody of Roald Øyen known from the Norwegian Broadcasting Corporation programs Julenøtter and Påskenøtter. Ødegaard and Eckbo ran the production company Seefood.

In 2006 he won the second season of Skal vi danse?, Norway's Dancing with the Stars. After that he hosted the show together with Guri Solberg. In 2008 he was awarded the Se og Hør readers' TV personality of the year award. The same thing happened in 2010.

Awards
| Preceded by Harald Rønneberg, Thomas Numme | Se og Hør's TV Personality of the Year; 2008 (with Guri Solberg) | Succeeded by Tore Strømøy |
| Preceded by Tore Strømøy | Se og Hør's TV Personality of the Year; 2010 (with Marthe Sveberg Bjørstad) | Succeeded by |
