= Thomas Numme =

Norwegian television presenter

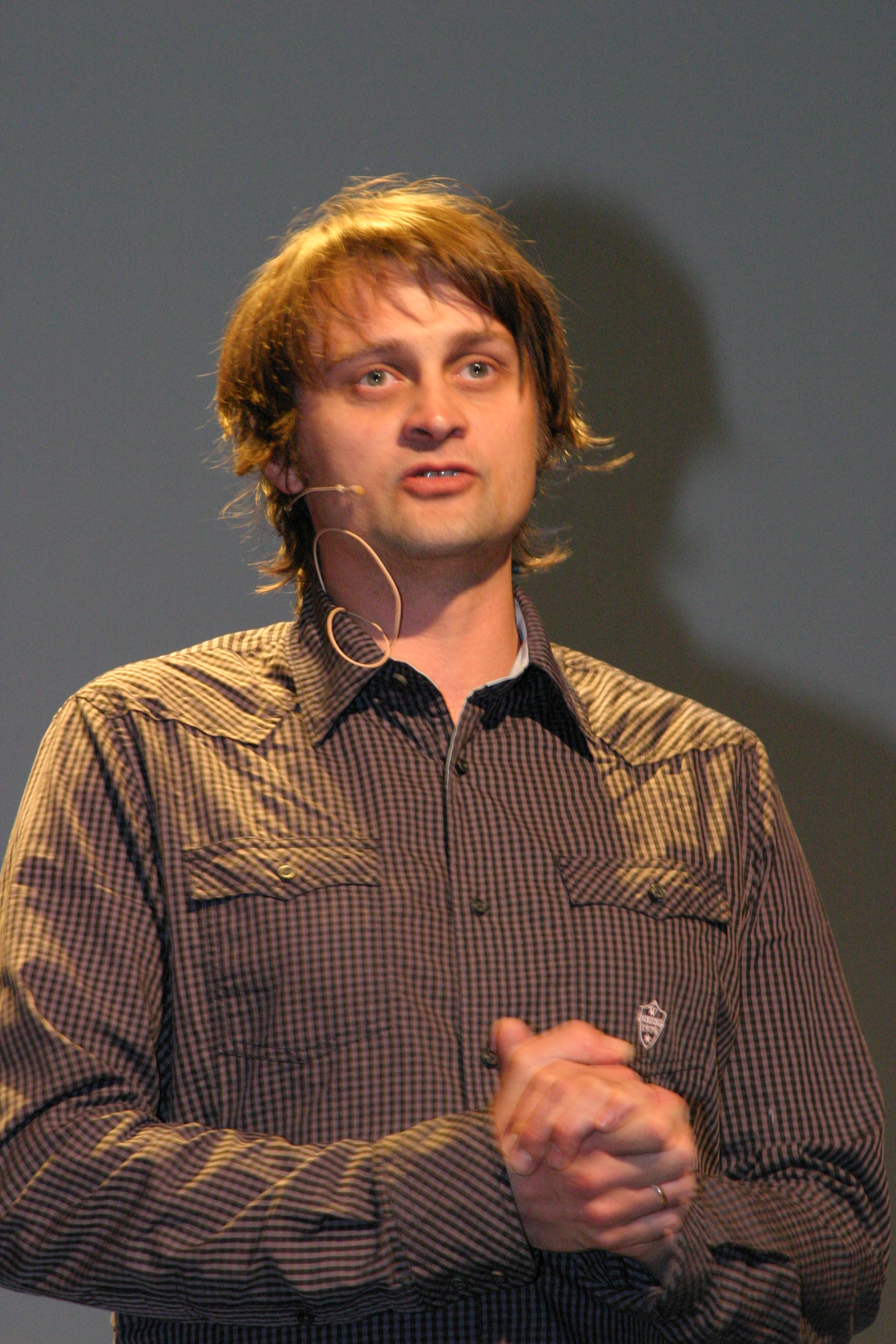
Thomas Numme, 2007

Thomas Numme (born 28 February 1970) is a Norwegian television personality.

He was born in Sandefjord, a son of Yngvar Numme, and took media education at Volda University College. He worked in the Norwegian Broadcasting Corporation on P3 radio and with juvenile shows before switching to TV 2 in 2003. With Harald Rønneberg, he hosted the first season of Idol in 2003 and then the Friday night show Senkveld. They haves also hosted the Spellemannprisen award show.

In 2006 and in 2007, Numme and Rønneberg were awarded the Se og Hør readers' TV personality of the year award. In 2018, they won the "Honorary Prize" at Gullruten.

Awards
Preceded by Erik Thorstvedt	Se og Hør's TV Personality of the Year; 2006, 2007 (together with Harald Rønneberg)	Succeeded by Kristian Ødegaard and Guri Solberg
