= Volda University College =

Institution of higher education in Norway

Coordinates: 62.1476°N 6.0741°E

- Type: Public university / State university college
- Established: August 1, 1994
- Rector: Odd Helge Mjellem Tonheim
- Academic staff: 350 (2020)
- Students: 4,600 (2024)
- Location: Volda, Norway
- Website: hivolda.no

Volda University College (Nynorsk: Høgskulen i Volda; Bokmål: Høgskolen i Volda), or HVO, a no-tuition state institution in Norway with over 150 years of history, is a public university of applied sciences. It offers a range of study programs—from bachelor's up to doctoral levels—in fields like Arts, Education, Media, Humanities, and Social Science. It is located in Volda in Møre og Romsdal county, Norway.

Notable alumni include Sylvi Listhaug, Thomas Numme and Arne Krumsvik.

== History ==
HVO was established on 1 August 1994 (32 years ago), when the Møre og Romsdal regional college and the Volda Teachers College were merged. HVO has a long tradition in Volda dating back to a teachers' training college which was first established here in 1895 (131 years ago). The rector is Odd Helge Mjellem Tonheim (2025). The university has approximately 4,600 students (2024) and 350 employees (2020).

HVO is divided into four faculties: the Faculty of Humanities and Education, the Faculty of Fine and Performing Arts, the Faculty of Social Sciences and History, and the Faculty of Media and Journalism. There are a total of 6 Master's degree programmes, 30 undergraduate study programmes, and about 300 courses offered.

HVO is host of the annual Norwegian Documentary Film Festival (since 1997, a.k.a. DOKFILM), the Animation Volda Festival (since 2007), and a social environment centered on the campus' large Rokken concert venue and the Rokken Café (both opened 2005).

In the 2010 feature film Trollhunter, the main characters are said to be students at HVO.
