= Ove Aunli =

Norwegian cross-country skier

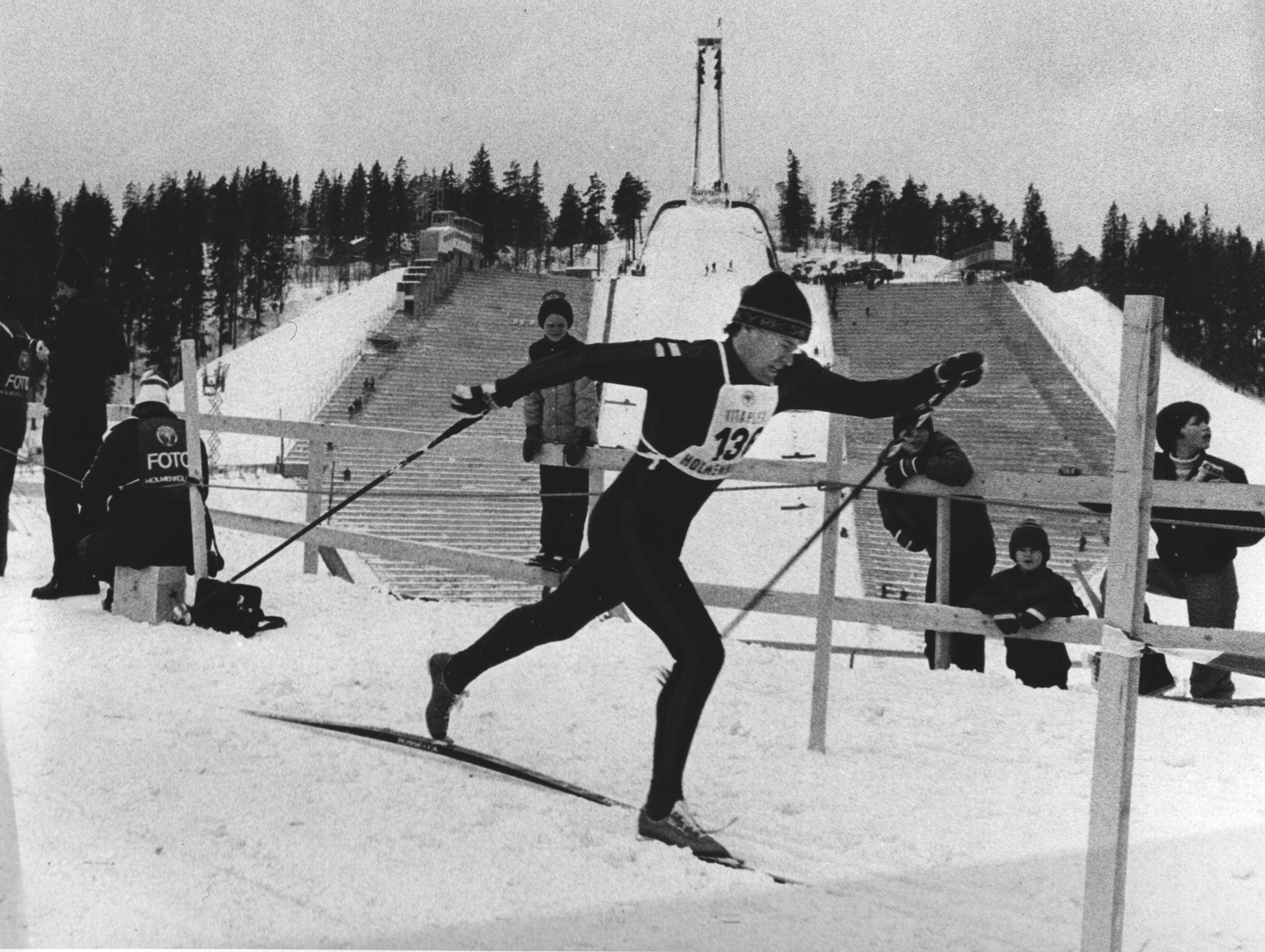
- Ove Aunli in March, 1980

Personal information
- Nationality: Norway
- Born: 12 March 1956 (age 70) Hemne Municipality, Norway
- Spouse: Berit Aunli (m. 1979)

Sport
- Sport: Skiing
- Club: Kyrksæterøra IL; Strindheim IL

World Cup career
- Seasons: 6 – (1982–1987)
- Indiv. starts: 26
- Indiv. podiums: 5
- Indiv. wins: 1
- Team starts: 6
- Team podiums: 5
- Team wins: 2
- Overall titles: 0 – (3rd in 1985)
Medal record
Men's cross-country skiing
Representing Norway
Olympic Games
Silver medal – second place	1980 Lake Placid	4 × 10 km relay
Bronze medal – third place	1980 Lake Placid	15 km
World Championships
Gold medal – first place	1982 Oslo	4 × 10 km relay
Gold medal – first place	1985 Seefeld	4 × 10 km relay
Silver medal – second place	1985 Seefeld	30 km
Bronze medal – third place	1978 Lahti	4 × 10 km relay
Bronze medal – third place	1985 Seefeld	50 km
Bronze medal – third place	1987 Oberstdorf	4 × 10 km relay

Ove Robert Aunli (born 12 March 1956 in Hemne Municipality) is a Norwegian former cross-country skier. He took the Olympic bronze medal in 1980 Lake Placid when Thomas Wassberg beat Juha Mieto by one-hundredth of a second for the gold medal, and won a silver medal as part of Norway's 4 × 10 km relay team.

Aunli found his biggest success at the FIS Nordic World Ski Championships, winning six medals. This included two golds (4 × 10 km: 1982, 1985), one silver (30 km: 1985), and three bronzes (4 × 10 km: 1978, 1987; 50 km: 1985).

Aunli represented the clubs Kyrksæterøra IL and Strindheim IL.

He is married to Berit Aunli.

== Cross-country skiing results ==
All results are sourced from the International Ski Federation (FIS).

=== Olympic Games ===
- 2 medals – (1 silver, 1 bronze)

Year	Age	15 km	30 km	50 km	4 × 10 km relay
1980	23	Bronze	8	—	Silver
1984	27	DSQ	—	DNF	4

=== World Championships ===
- 6 medals – (2 gold, 1 silver, 3 bronze)

Year	Age	15 km	30 km	50 km	4 × 10 km relay
1978	21	10	—	—	Bronze
1982	25	11	4	—	Gold
1985	28	9	Silver	Bronze	Gold
1987	30	—	19	—	Bronze

=== World Cup ===
==== Season standings ====
Season	Age	Overall
1982	26	14
1983	27	48
1984	28	12
1985	29	3rd place, bronze medalist(s)
1986	30	24
1987	31	27

==== Individual podiums ====
- 1 victory
- 5 podiums

No.	Season	Date	Location	Race	Level	Place
1	1983–84	16 December 1983	Ramsau, Austria	30 km Individual	World Cup	2nd
2	1984–85	15 December 1984	Davos, Switzerland	30 km Individual	World Cup	1st
3	1984–85	18 January 1985	Seefeld, Austria	30 km Individual	World Championships^{[1]}	2nd
4	1984–85	27 January 1985	Seefeld, Austria	50 km Individual	World Championships^{[1]}	3rd
5	1985–86	14 December 1985	Biwabik, United States	30 km Individual F	World Cup	3rd

==== Team podiums ====
- 2 victories
- 5 podiums

No.	Season	Date	Location	Race	Level	Place	Teammates
1	1981–82	25 February 1982	Oslo, Norway	4 × 10 km Relay	World Championships^{[1]}	1st	Eriksen / Mikkelsplass / Brå
2	1984–85	24 February 1985	Seefeld, Austria	4 × 10 km Relay	World Championships^{[1]}	1st	Monsen / Mikkelsplass / Holte
3	1984–85	17 March 1985	Oslo, Norway	4 × 10 km Relay	World Cup	3rd	Hole / Mikkelsplass / Ulvang
4	1986–87	17 February 1987	Oberstdorf, West Germany	4 × 10 Relay F	World Championships^{[1]}	3rd	Ulvang / Mikkelsplass / Langli
5	1986–87	8 March 1987	Falun, Sweden	4 × 10 km Relay C	World Cup	3rd	Mikkelsplass / Ulvang / Langli

Note: ^{1} Until the 1999 World Championships, World Championship races were included in the World Cup scoring system.
