= Ristijärvi =

- Municipality
- Ristijärven kunta Ristijärvi kommun
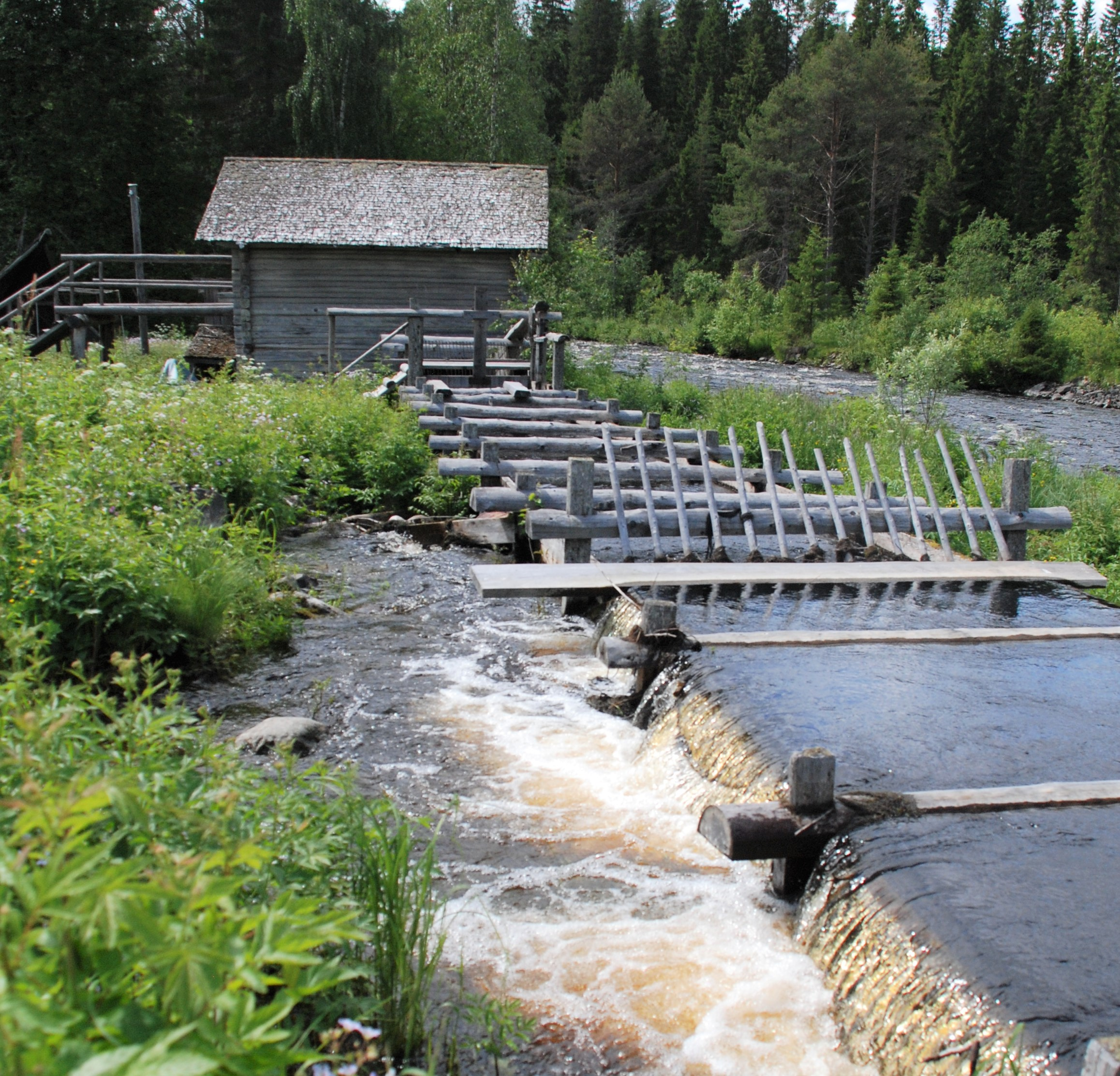
- Karppala mill along the Torvenjoki River.

- Coat of arms

- Location of Ristijärvi in Finland
- Interactive map of Ristijärvi
- Coordinates: 64°30.3′N 028°13′E
- Country: Finland
- Region: Kainuu
- Sub-region: Kajaani
- Charter: 1867
- Seat: Ristijärvi (village)

Government
  - Municipal manager: Katri Aula

Area (2018-01-01)
  - Total: 897.93 km^{2} (346.69 sq mi)
  - Land: 835.83 km^{2} (322.72 sq mi)
  - Water: 62.31 km^{2} (24.06 sq mi)
  - Rank: 94th largest in Finland

Population (2025-12-31)
  - Total: 1,158
  - Rank: 286th largest in Finland
  - Density: 1.39/km^{2} (3.6/sq mi)

Population by native language
  - Finnish: 96.2% (official)
  - Others: 3.8%

Population by age
  - 0 to 14: 10.2%
  - 15 to 64: 51.3%
  - 65 or older: 38.5%
- Time zone: UTC+02:00 (EET)
  - Summer (DST): UTC+03:00 (EEST)
- Website: www.ristijarvi.fi

Ristijärvi (Finnish pronunciation: [ˈristiˌjærʋi]) is a municipality of Finland. It is part of the Kainuu region. The municipality has a population of 1,158 (31 December 2025), which makes it the smallest municipality in Kainuu in terms of population. It covers an area of 897.93 square kilometres (346.69 sq mi) of which 62.31 km^{2} (24.06 sq mi) is water. The population density is 1.39 inhabitants per square kilometre (3.6/sq mi). The municipality is unilingually Finnish.

The municipality was founded in 1867, while the wooden church, designed by Gustaf af Sillén, dates back to 1807. The municipality was named after the Ristijärvi lake (lit. 'Cross Lake') referring to the shape of the lake.

== Politics ==
Results of the 2023 Finnish parliamentary election in Ristijärvi:

- Centre Party 41.5%
- Finns Party 25.7%
- Left Alliance 7.9%
- Social Democratic Party 7.6%
- National Coalition Party 7.3%
- Christian Democrats 5.8%
- Green League 2.3%

As of 2021 Finnish municipal elections, Ristijärvi municipal council is made up of: Centre Party (10 seats), Finns Party (2), National Coalition Party (1), Left Alliance (1), and Green League (1).

== People born in Ristijärvi ==
- Salomo Pulkkinen, Member of Parliament
- Kari Härkönen, cross country skier
- Hannu Takkula, Member of the European Parliament
- Kaisa Mäkäräinen, biathlete
