= Pentti Pelkonen =

Finnish cross-country skier

Personal information
- Nationality: Finnish
- Born: 20 March 1930 (age 95) Kivennapa, Finland

Sport
- Sport: Cross-country skiing

Pentti Pelkonen (born 20 March 1930) is a Finnish cross-country skier. He competed in the men's 50 kilometre event at the 1960 Winter Olympics.

== Cross-country skiing results ==
=== Olympic Games ===
Year	Age	15 km	30 km	50 km	4 × 10 km relay
1960	29	—	—	6	—
