= Daniel Sandoz =

Swiss cross-country skier

Personal information
- Nationality: Swiss
- Born: 7 February 1961 (age 64); La Chaux-du-Milieu, Switzerland

Sport
- Sport: Cross-country skiing

Daniel Sandoz (born 7 February 1961) is a Swiss cross-country skier. He competed in the men's 30 kilometre event at the 1984 Winter Olympics.
