= Markus Fähndrich =

Swiss cross-country skier

Personal information
- Nationality: Swiss
- Born: 24 March 1960 (age 65); Cham, Switzerland

Sport
- Sport: Cross-country skiing

Markus Fähndrich (born 24 March 1960) is a Swiss cross-country skier. He competed at the 1984 Winter Olympics and the 1988 Winter Olympics.
