= FIS Nordic World Ski Championships 1985 =

International Nordic skiing competition

- Host city: Seefeld
- Country: Austria
- Events: 13
- Opening: January 16, 1985
- Closing: January 27, 1985
- Main venue: Seefeld

The FIS Nordic World Ski Championships 1985 took place January 16–27, 1985 in Seefeld, Austria (near Innsbruck). This was the fourth time the Innsbruck area hosted these championships, having done so in 1933, the 1964 Winter Olympics, and the 1976 Winter Olympics. Both the Gundersen method and freestyle skiing for the cross-country skiing portion of the event were introduced in both Nordic combined events (individual and 3 × 10 km relay).

== Men's cross-country ==
=== 15 km ===
January 22, 1985

Medal	Athlete	Time
Gold	Kari Härkönen (FIN)	40:42.7
Silver	Thomas Wassberg (SWE)	40:56.0
Bronze	Maurilio de Zolt (ITA)	41:27.2

=== 30 km ===
January 18, 1985

Medal	Athlete	Time
Gold	Gunde Svan (SWE)	1:18:24.1
Silver	Ove Aunli (NOR)	1:18:49.1
Bronze	Harri Kirvesniemi (FIN)	1:19:00.2

=== 50 km ===
January 27, 1985

Medal	Athlete	Time
Gold	Gunde Svan (SWE)	2:10:49.9
Silver	Maurilio De Zolt (ITA)	2:11:52.6
Bronze	Ove Aunli (NOR)	2:12:37.7

=== 4 × 10 km relay ===
January 24, 1985

Medal	Team	Time
Gold	Norway (Arild Monsen, Pål Gunnar Mikkelsplass, Tor Håkon Holte, Ove Aunli)	1:52:21.0
Silver	Italy (Marco Albarello, Giorgio Vanzetta, Maurilio de Zolt, Giuseppe Ploner)	1:52:27.5
Bronze	Sweden (Erik Östlund, Thomas Wassberg, Thomas Eriksson, Gunde Svan)	1:52:40.4

== Women's cross-country ==
=== 5 km ===
January 21, 1985

Medal	Athlete	Time
Gold	Anette Bøe (NOR)	15:14.8
Silver	Marja-Liisa Kirvesniemi (FIN)	15:25.1
Bronze	Grete Ingeborg Nykkelmo (NOR)	15:26.8

=== 10 km ===
January 19, 1985

Medal	Athlete	Time
Gold	Anette Bøe (NOR)	30:54.8
Silver	Marja-Liisa Kirvesniemi (FIN)	30:56.2
Bronze	Grete Ingeborg Nykkelmo (NOR)	30:58.0

=== 20 km ===
January 26, 1985

Medal	Athlete	Time
Gold	Grete Ingeborg Nykkelmo (NOR)	59:19.1
Silver	Brit Pettersen (NOR)	59:37.5
Bronze	Anette Bøe (NOR)	59:43.5

=== 4 × 5 km relay ===
January 22, 1985

Medal	Team	Time
Gold	Soviet Union (Tamara Tikhonova, Raisa Smetanina, Liliya Vasilchenko, Anfisa Romanova)	1:04:50.1
Silver	Norway (Anette Bøe, Anne Jahren, Grete Ingeborg Nykkelmo, Berit Aunli)	1:04:58.8
Bronze	East Germany (Manuela Drescher, Gaby Nestler, Antje Misersky, Ute Noack)	1:05:57.0

== Men's Nordic combined ==
=== 15 km Individual Gundersen ===
January 18, 1985

Medal	Athlete	Points
Gold	Hermann Weinbuch (FRG)	410.10
Silver	Geir Andersen (NOR)	399.84
Bronze	Jouko Karjalainen (FIN)	396.60

=== 3 × 10 km team ===
January 25, 1985

Medal	Team	Points
Gold	West Germany (Thomas Müller, Hubert Schwarz, Hermann Weinbuch)	1276.90
Silver	Norway (Geir Andersen, Espen Andersen, Hallstein Bøgseth)	1256.02
Bronze	Finland (Jyri Pelkonen, Jukka Ylipulli, Jouko Karjalainen)	1202.60

== Men's ski jumping ==
=== Individual normal hill ===
January 26, 1985

Medal	Athlete	Points
Gold	Jens Weißflog (GDR)	225.3
Silver	Andreas Felder (AUT)	216.0
Bronze	Per Bergerud (NOR)	214.6

=== Individual large hill ===
January 20, 1985

Medal	Athlete	Points
Gold	Per Bergerud (NOR)	224.2
Silver	Jari Puikkonen (FIN)	223.0
Bronze	Matti Nykänen (FIN)	221.7

=== Team large hill ===
January 22, 1985

Medal	Team	Points
Gold	Finland (Tuomo Ylipulli, Pentti Kokkonen, Matti Nykänen, Jari Puikkonen)	583.0
Silver	Austria (Andreas Felder, Armin Kogler, Günther Stranner, Ernst Vettori)	579.2
Bronze	East Germany (Frank Sauerbrey, Manfred Deckert, Klaus Ostwald, Jens Weißflog)	550.8

== Medal table ==
Medal winners by nation.

* Host nation (Austria)

Rank	Nation	Gold	Silver	Bronze	Total
1	Norway (NOR)	5	5	5	15
2	Finland (FIN)	2	3	4	9
3	Sweden (SWE)	2	1	1	4
4	West Germany (FRG)	2	0	0	2
5	East Germany (GDR)	1	0	2	3
6	Soviet Union (URS)	1	0	0	1
7	Italy (ITA)	0	2	1	3
8	Austria (AUT)*	0	2	0	2
Totals (8 entries)		13	13	13	39
