= List of FIS Cross-Country World Cup men's race winners =

Cross-country skiing

This is a list of individual male winners in FIS Cross-Country World Cup from 1982 season to present. The list includes distance races, sprints and stage events as well as the distance and sprint stages of the stage events. Distance races have been part of the World Cup ever since its formation. Sprint discipline was first introduced in 1995/96 World Cup season and stage events are first introduced in 2006/07 World Cup season. World Championship and Olympic races were counted as World Cup races until the 1999 World Championships and the 1994 Winter Olympics.

== History ==
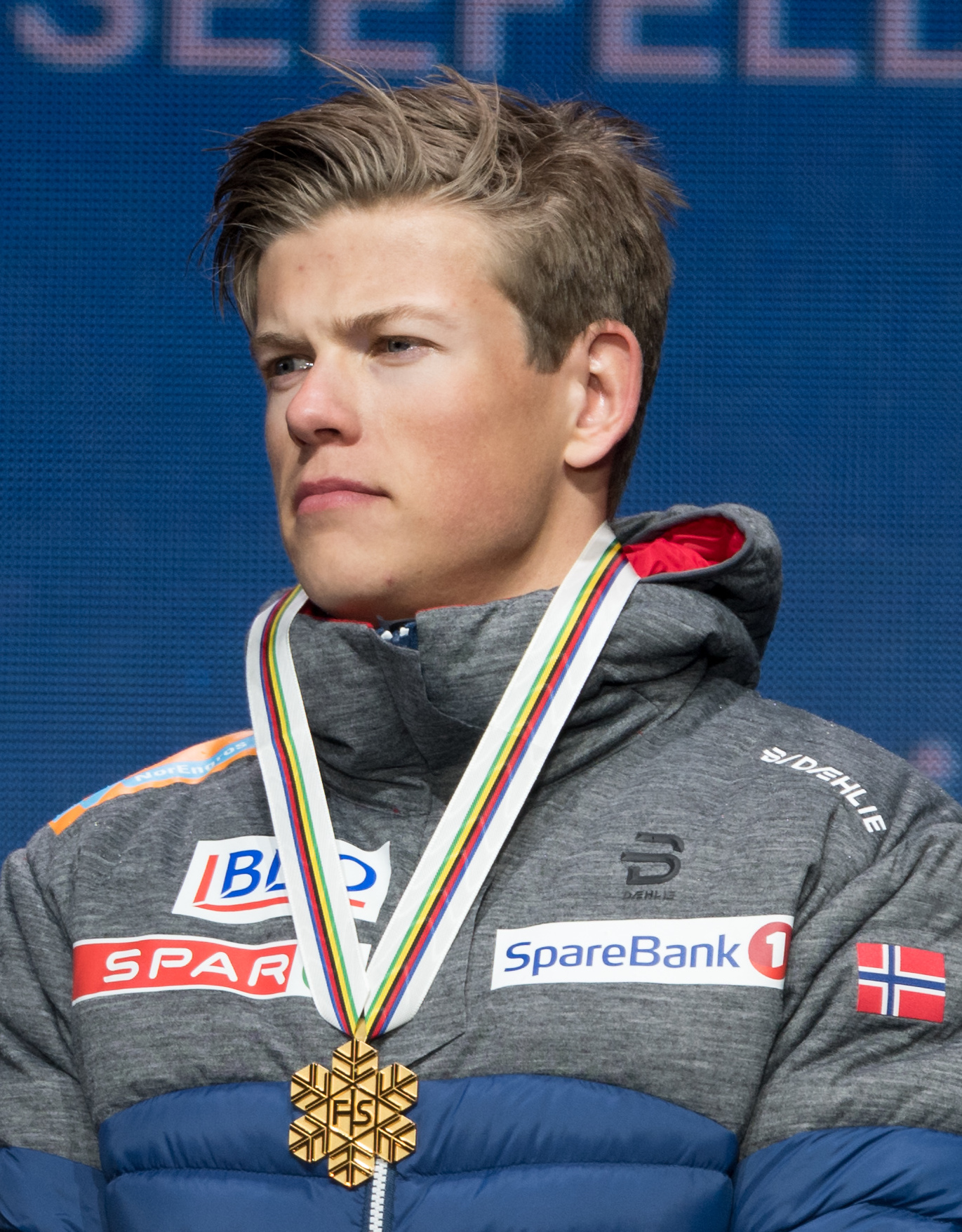
Johannes Høsflot Klæbo (113) is the most successful male cross-country skier of all time in terms of victories.

In 45 official World Cup seasons, as of 22 March 2026, 983 individual races (662 distance, 279 sprint, 42 stage events) for men were held. These events saw 984 winners, because one race (individual 15 km classic race on 3 February 2007) ended with a tie.

A total of 171 male cross-country skier from 19 nations have won at least one individual race. In this list Soviet Union and Russia listed separately but counted as one nation. West Germany and Germany listed together since there is no East German winner and the only West German winner Jochen Behle continued his career for Germany after the German reunification in 1990. The first winner was the Norwegian Pål Gunnar Mikkelsplass who won the 15 km individual race in Reit im Winkl on 9 January 1982. The newest member of the list is Ansgar Evensen who won the classical sprint in Drammen on 12 March 2026.

With 113 World Cup victories, Norwegian Johannes Høsflot Klæbo is the most successful World Cup racer in the history. Among those, 65 wins have come in sprint races which makes him also the best male World Cup sprinter of all-time. The previous record holder Bjørn Dæhlie, has won 45 of his 46 victories in distance races and he is the best distance skier in World Cup history. In stage events, which is the newest individual race format, Klæbo leads with 10 victories.

Pål Gunnar Mikkelsplass was also the first skier to win races in two and three different seasons as he won the opening races of the first two official World Cup seasons (1981/82, 1982/83) and the 1984/85 season. The Kazakh Vladimir Smirnov and the Norwegian Petter Northug won races in 11 different seasons, but Northug has won races in 11 consecutive seasons and he is still only skier to do so. Gunde Svan was the first skier to win a race in four, five, six, seven, eight and nine seasons and all these seasons were consecutive. Throughout his 9-season long career, Svan managed to win at least one race in every season he competed. Bjørn Dæhlie has won races for 10 consecutive seasons from 1989/90 to 1998/99 which made him the only skier who won a race in every year in a single decade. Smirnov was the first to win races in ten and eleven seasons, while Dæhlie was the first to win in ten consecutive seasons and Northug was the first and the only skier to win in eleven consecutive seasons.

The youngest male winner is Petter Northug (born 6 January 1986) who won the 20 km pursuit race in Falun on 8 March 2006 at the age of 20 years and 61 days. The oldest winner is Harri Kirvesniemi (born 10 May 1958) who was aged 41 years 306 days when he won the prestigious 50 km classical mass start race in Oslo Holmenkollen on 11 March 2000, 17 years 358 days after his first race victory in Štrbské Pleso on 19 March 1982, which is also the longest time between the first and the last victory in the World Cup. The oldest skier to win his first race was Giorgio Di Centa (born 7 October 1972). When he won the 15 km individual freestyle race in Canmore on 5 February 2010 which was his only career victory, he was aged 37 years and 121 days.

Mikhail Devyatyarov and Mikhail Devyatyarov Jr. are the first father and son pair to win a World Cup race. They are followed by the Canadians Pierre and Alex Harvey. Apart from father-son pairs, there are two different brother pairs won a World Cup race: Mathias and Thobias Fredriksson of Sweden and Petter and Tomas Northug of Norway. From these two, the Fredriksson brothers were the first to do so. During the 2002/03 season, three consecutive World Cup races were won by Fredriksson brothers (two for Mathias and one for Thobias) which was also followed by the Northug brothers who became the winner of two consecutive races in the 2014/15 World Cup season after the victory in 2015 Tour de Ski was given to Petter Northug on 20 July 2016 due to illegal use of asthma medication by the initial winner Martin Johnsrud Sundby.

== Statistics ==
As of 22 March 2026

	Total	World Cup			Stage World Cup	
	Total	Distance	Sprint	Stage events	Distance	Sprint
Events	983	501	218	42	161	61
Double wins	1	1	–	–	–	–
Winners	984	502	218	42	161	61

- Distance: Competitions of distances longer than 1.8 km
- Sprint: Competitions of distances shorter than 1.8 km
- Stage events: Overall winners of Stage World Cup events (Nordic Opening, World Cup Final, Tour de Ski, FIS Ski Tour, Sprint Tour and Ski Tour Canada)

== Winners ==
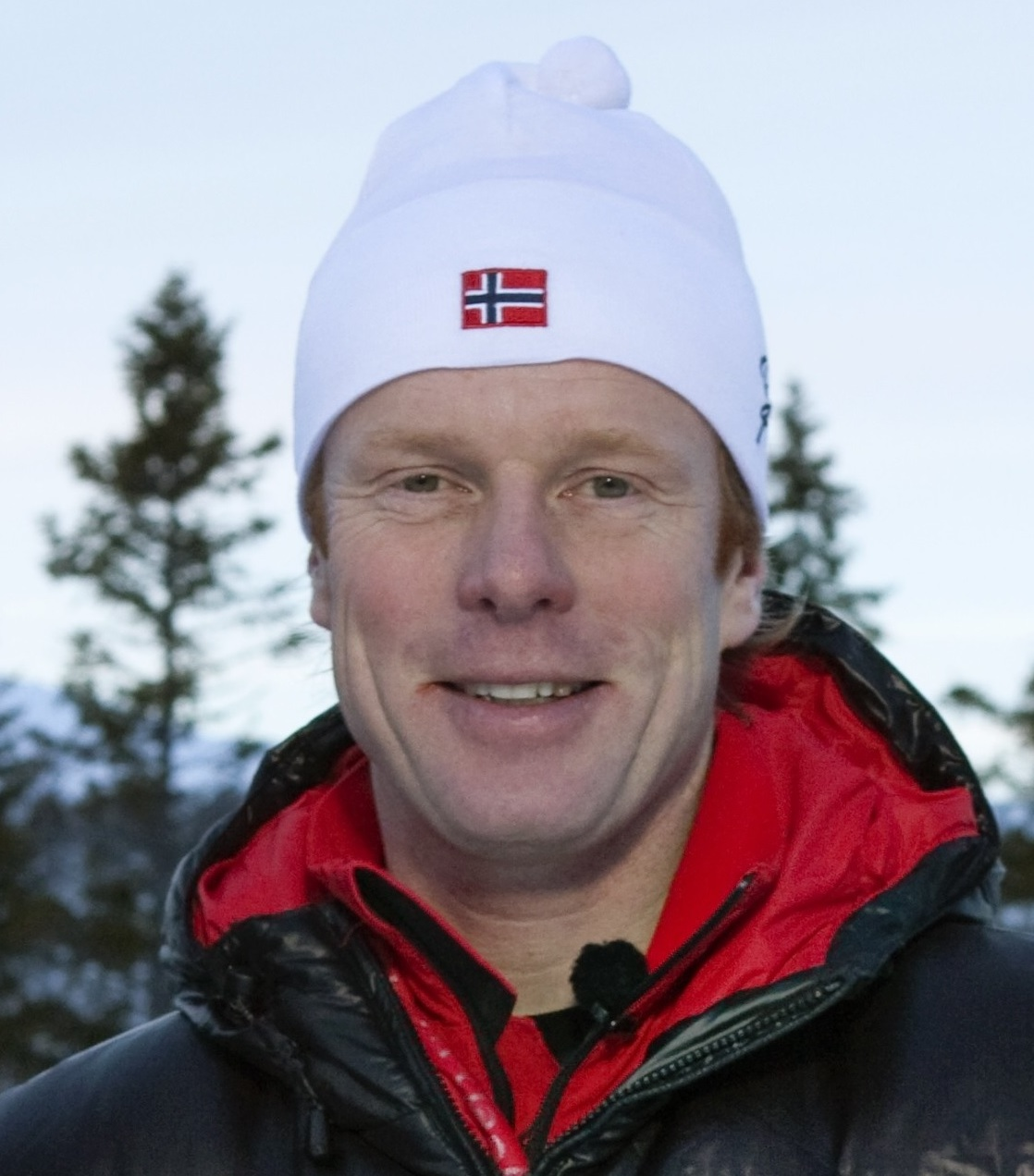
Bjørn Dæhlie (46) is the most successful male distance skier in World Cup history, with 45 distance victories.

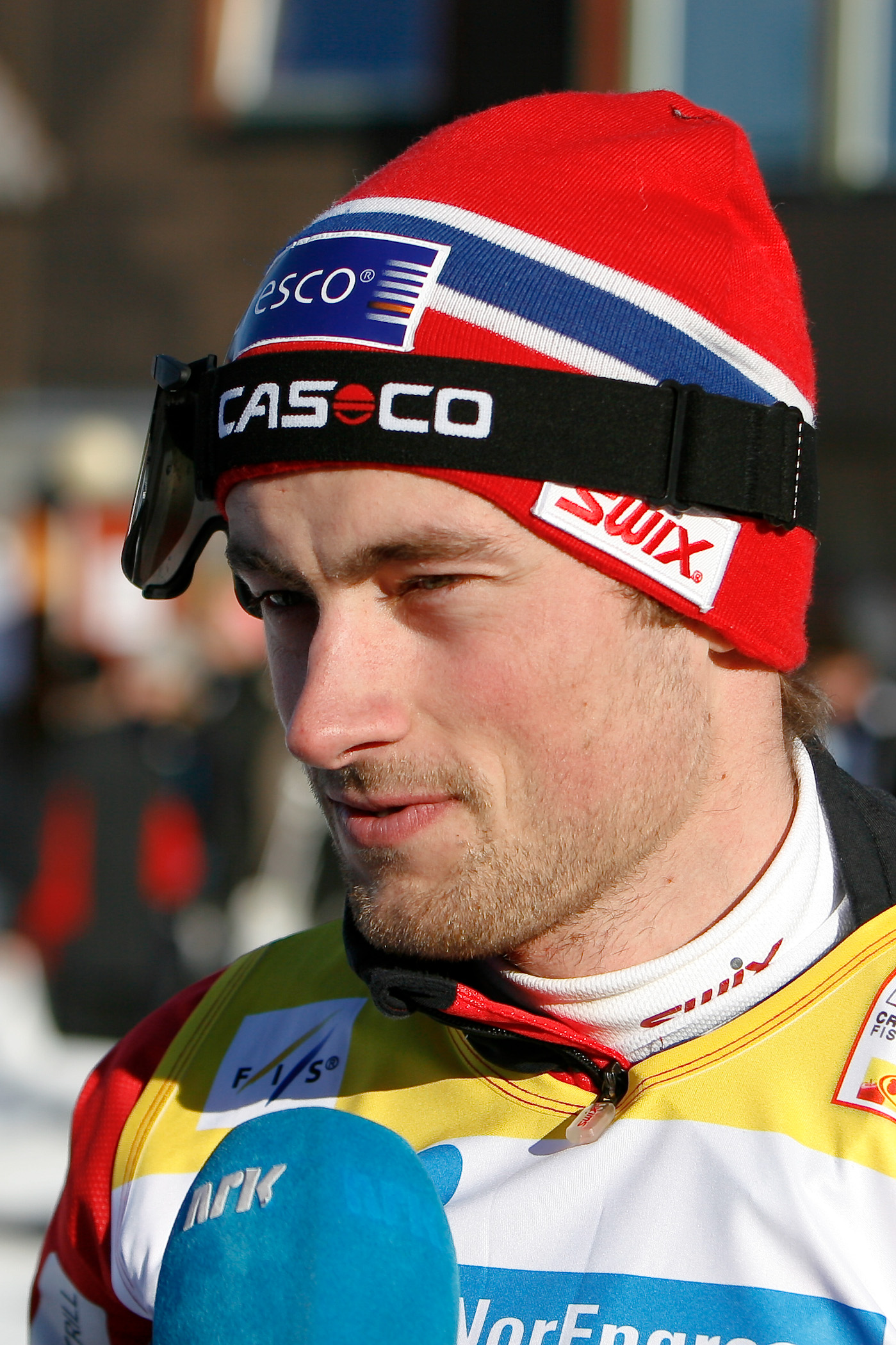
Petter Northug (38) is the youngest man ever to win a World Cup race.

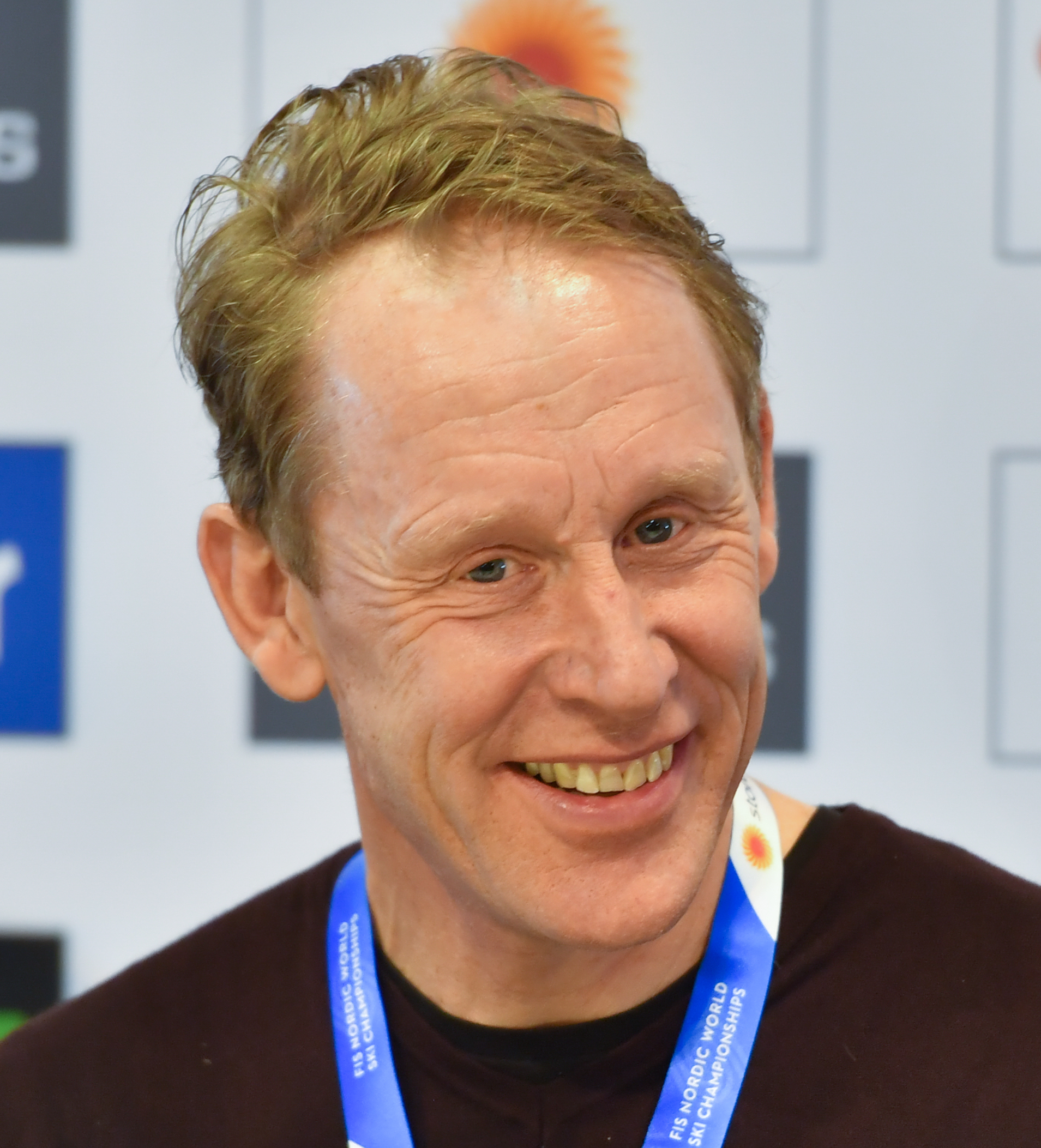
Gunde Svan (30) had won at least one race in every season he competed.

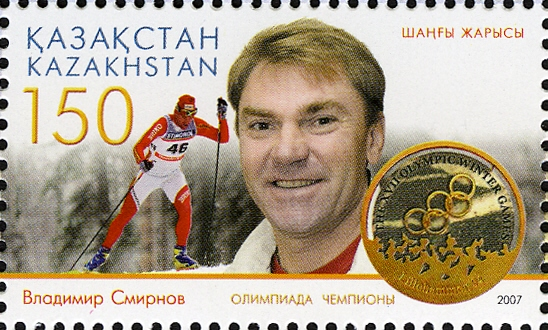
Vladimir Smirnov (30) had won at least one World Cup race in 11 different seasons.

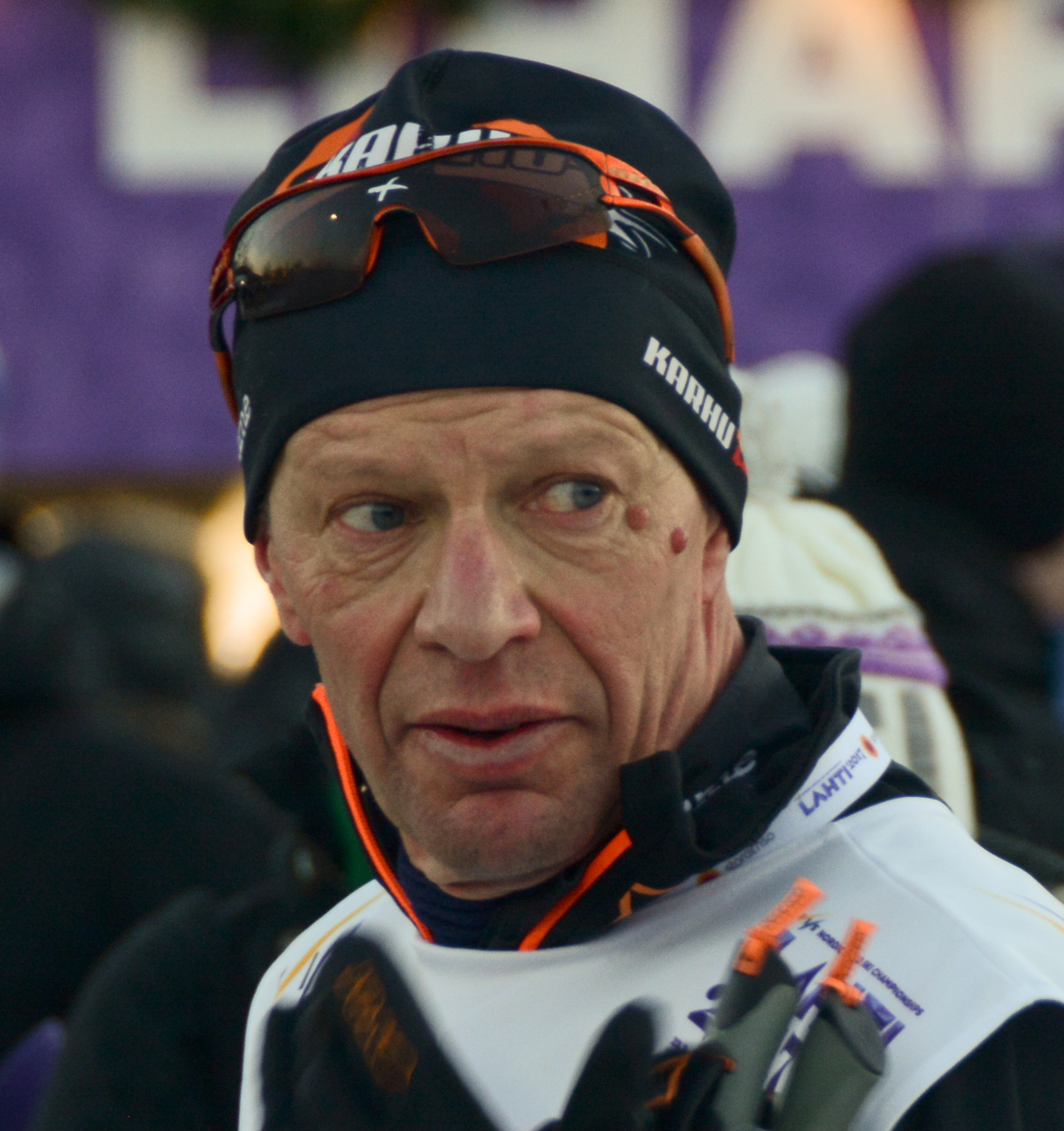
Harri Kirvesniemi (6) is the oldest World Cup race winner of all time.

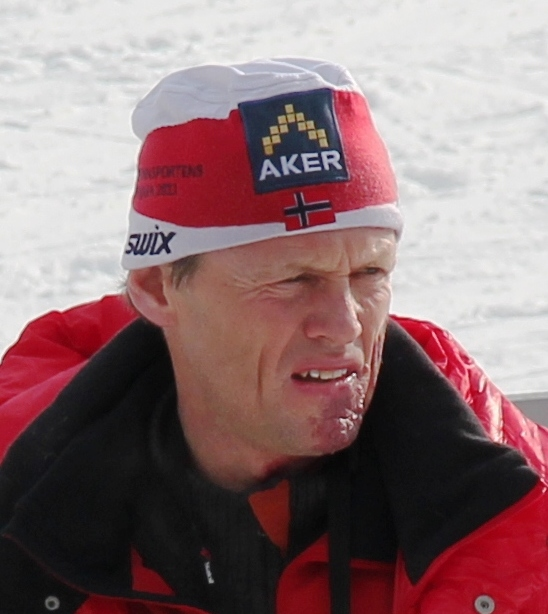
Pål Gunnar Mikkelsplass (4) is the winner of the first ever World Cup race.

As of 22 March 2026

Active athletes
Active athletes who haven't competed in the current season's World Cup competitions
Active athletes who aren't allowed to compete due to doping offence

Rk.	Name	Ref.	Nation	World Cup seasons	Victories	World Cup			Stage World Cup	
Rk.	Name	Ref.	Nation	World Cup seasons	Victories	Distance	Sprint	Stage events	Distance	Sprint
1	Johannes Høsflot Klæbo		Norway	2016–	113	22	47	10	16	18
2	Bjørn Dæhlie		Norway	1989–1999	46	45	1	N/A	N/A	N/A
3	Petter Northug		Norway	2005–2017	38	8	6	6	15	3
4	Gunde Svan		Sweden	1982–1991	30	30	N/A	N/A	N/A	N/A
	Vladimir Smirnov (7 SOV / 23 KAZ)		Kazakhstan	1982–1999	30	30	–	N/A	N/A	N/A
	Martin Johnsrud Sundby		Norway	2005–2020	30	11	–	8	11	–
7	Alexander Bolshunov		Russia	2017–	28	16	1	3	8	–
8	Dario Cologna		Switzerland	2007–2022	26	7	2	6	11	–
9	Lukáš Bauer		Czech Republic	1997–2016	18	9	–	2	7	–
	Federico Pellegrino		Italy	2010–2026	18	–	13	–	–	5
11	Emil Jönsson		Sweden	2003–2018	16	–	13	–	–	3
12	Sergey Ustiugov		Russia	2013–	15	1	2	1	8	3
13	Torgny Mogren		Sweden	1983–1998	13	13	–	N/A	N/A	N/A
	Thomas Alsgaard		Norway	1993–2003	13	11	2	N/A	N/A	N/A
	Tor Arne Hetland		Norway	1995–2009	13	2	9	–	–	2
	Axel Teichmann		Germany	1998–2014	13	8	–	–	5	–
	Ola Vigen Hattestad		Norway	2003–2017	13	–	13	–	–	–
	Pål Golberg		Norway	2010–2025	13	7	3	1	1	1
19	Jens Arne Svartedal		Norway	1997–2010	12	1	11	–	–	–
	Harald Østberg Amundsen		Norway	2018–	12	7	–	1	4	–
21	Per Elofsson		Sweden	1997–2003	11	11	–	N/A	N/A	N/A
	Tobias Angerer		Germany	1998–2014	11	10	–	1	–	–
	Eldar Rønning		Norway	2003–2015	11	4	3	–	3	1
	Alexey Poltoranin		Kazakhstan	2005–2019	11	3	1	–	7	–
	Simen Hegstad Krüger		Norway	2013–	11	8	–	–	3	–
26	Mika Myllylä		Finland	1992–2000	10	10	–	N/A	N/A	N/A
	Maurice Manificat		France	2006–2022	10	6	–	–	4	–
	Iivo Niskanen		Finland	2011–	10	8	–	–	2	–
29	Vegard Ulvang		Norway	1984–1997	9	9	–	N/A	N/A	N/A
	Alexei Prokourorov (3 SOV / 6 RUS)		Russia	1984–2002	9	9	–	N/A	N/A	N/A
	Mathias Fredriksson		Sweden	1993–2011	9	8	1	–	–	–
	Odd-Bjørn Hjelmeset		Norway	1993–2012	9	4	4	–	1	–
	Alexander Legkov		Russia	2003–2016	9	4	–	2	3	–
	Eirik Brandsdal		Norway	2007–2020	9	–	7	–	–	2
35	Vincent Vittoz		France	1996–2011	8	7	–	–	1	–
	Finn Hågen Krogh		Norway	2011–	8	2	2	–	3	1
	Alex Harvey		Canada	2008–2019	8	1	1	–	5	1
	Emil Iversen		Norway	2013–	8	2	1	–	4	1
39	Johann Mühlegg		Spain	1991–2002	7	7	–	N/A	N/A	N/A
	Maxim Vylegzhanin		Russia	2005–2019	7	5	–	–	2	–
	Martin Løwstrøm Nyenget		Norway	2014–	7	7	–	–	–	–
42	Thomas Wassberg		Sweden	1982–1988	6	6	N/A	N/A	N/A	N/A
	Harri Kirvesniemi		Finland	1982–2001	6	6	–	N/A	N/A	N/A
	Anders Aukland		Norway	1993–2012	6	6	–	–	–	–
	Pietro Piller Cottrer		Italy	1994–2012	6	5	–	–	1	–
	Andrus Veerpalu		Estonia	1992–2011	6	6	–	–	–	–
	Sjur Røthe		Norway	2009–2024	6	2	–	–	4	–
	Erik Valnes		Norway	2017–	6	1	3	–	1	1
49	Bill Koch		United States	1982–1992	5	5	N/A	N/A	N/A	N/A
	Cristian Zorzi		Italy	1993–2010	5	–	5	–	–	–
	Thobias Fredriksson		Sweden	1995–2009	5	–	5	–	–	–
	Johan Olsson		Sweden	2001–2017	5	5	–	–	–	–
	Anders Gløersen		Norway	2007–2018	5	1	4	–	–	–
	Nikita Kryukov		Russia	2006–2017	5	–	2	–	–	3
	Marcus Hellner		Sweden	2006–2018	5	2	–	–	3	–
	Lucas Chanavat		France	2015–	5	–	3	–	–	2
57	Pål Gunnar Mikkelsplass		Norway	1982–1996	4	4	–	N/A	N/A	N/A
	Jari Isometsä		Finland	1990–2006	4	4	–	N/A	N/A	N/A
	Frode Estil		Norway	1995–2007	4	4	–	–	–	–
	Peter Larsson		Sweden	1999–2009	4	–	4	–	–	–
	René Sommerfeldt		Germany	1996–2010	4	3	–	–	1	–
	Teodor Peterson		Sweden	2009–2020	4	–	2	–	–	2
	Matti Heikkinen		Finland	2002–2019	4	1	–	–	3	–
	Didrik Tønseth		Norway	2012–2026	4	2	–	1	1	–
	Richard Jouve		France	2015–2026	4	–	4	–	–	–
66	Alexander Zavyalov		Soviet Union	1982–1984	3	3	N/A	N/A	N/A	N/A
	Pierre Harvey		Canada	1982–1988	3	3	N/A	N/A	N/A	N/A
	Erling Jevne		Norway	1987–2002	3	3	–	N/A	N/A	N/A
	Silvio Fauner		Italy	1987–2006	3	3	–	N/A	N/A	N/A
	Håvard Bjerkeli		Norway	1998–2006	3	–	3	N/A	N/A	N/A
	Björn Lind		Sweden	2000–2010	3	–	3	–	–	–
	Børre Næss		Norway	2003–2011	3	–	3	–	–	–
	Anders Södergren		Sweden	1999–2015	3	3	–	–	–	–
	Johan Kjølstad		Norway	2002–2012	3	–	2	–	–	1
	Alexey Petukhov		Russia	2003–2018	3	–	3	–	–	–
	Nikolay Morilov		Russia	2004–2017	3	–	1	–	–	2
	Devon Kershaw		Canada	2004–2018	3	1	1	–	–	1
	Daniel Rickardsson		Sweden	2004–2020	3	2	–	–	1	–
	Calle Halfvarsson		Sweden	2009–	3	–	–	–	1	2
	Einar Hedegart		Norway	2024–	3	3	–	–	–	–
81	Oddvar Brå		Norway	1982–1989	2	2	N/A	N/A	N/A	N/A
	Nikolay Zimyatov		Soviet Union	1982–1988	2	2	N/A	N/A	N/A	N/A
	Tor Håkon Holte		Norway	1982–1986	2	2	N/A	N/A	N/A	N/A
	Thomas Eriksson		Sweden	1982–1993	2	2	N/A	N/A	N/A	N/A
	Mikhail Devyatyarov		Soviet Union	1982–1992	2	2	N/A	N/A	N/A	N/A
	Terje Langli		Norway	1986–1996	2	2	–	N/A	N/A	N/A
	Marco Albarello		Italy	1984–1998	2	2	–	N/A	N/A	N/A
	Mikhail Botvinov		Austria	1990–2007	2	2	–	–	–	–
	Peter Schlickenrieder		Germany	1992–2001	2	–	2	N/A	N/A	N/A
	Morten Brørs		Norway	1997–2004	2	–	2	N/A	N/A	N/A
	Mikhail Ivanov		Russia	1997–2007	2	2	–	–	–	–
	Fabio Maj		Italy	1991–2004	2	1	1	N/A	N/A	N/A
	Fulvio Valbusa		Italy	1992–2006	2	2	–	N/A	N/A	N/A
	Christian Hoffmann		Austria	1994–2009	2	2	–	–	–	–
	Trond Iversen		Norway	2000–2009	2	–	2	–	–	–
	Vasily Rochev		Russia	2000–2010	2	2	–	–	–	–
	Renato Pasini		Italy	2000–2013	2	–	2	–	–	–
	Sergey Shiryayev		Russia	2006–2013	2	–	–	–	2	–
	John Kristian Dahl		Norway	2001–2013	2	–	1	–	–	1
	Ilia Chernousov		Russia	2006–2016	2	1	–	–	1	–
	Tim Tscharnke		Germany	2008–2017	2	1	–	–	1	–
	Petr Sedov		Russia	2009–2022	2	1	–	–	1	–
	Sindre Bjørnestad Skar		Norway	2011–2026	2	–	2	–	–	–
	Hans Christer Holund		Norway	2009–2023	2	–	–	–	2	–
	Oskar Svensson		Sweden	2014–	2	–	1	–	–	1
	Iver Tildheim Andersen		Norway	2022–	2	2	–	–	–	–
	Gus Schumacher		United States	2019–	2	1	–	–	1	–
	Mattis Stenshagen		Norway	2016–	2	–	–	–	2	–
109	Jan Ottosson		Sweden	1982–1994	1	1	N/A	N/A	N/A	N/A
	Jan Lindvall		Norway	1982–1984	1	1	N/A	N/A	N/A	N/A
	Asko Autio		Finland	1982–1983	1	1	N/A	N/A	N/A	N/A
	Ove Aunli		Norway	1982–1987	1	1	N/A	N/A	N/A	N/A
	Kari Härkönen		Finland	1982–1985	1	1	N/A	N/A	N/A	N/A
	Lars Erik Eriksen		Norway	1982–1984	1	1	N/A	N/A	N/A	N/A
	Maurilio De Zolt		Italy	1982–1994	1	1	N/A	N/A	N/A	N/A
	Lars Håland		Sweden	1986–1998	1	1	–	N/A	N/A	N/A
	Christer Majbäck		Sweden	1984–1999	1	1	–	N/A	N/A	N/A
	Jochen Behle		Germany	1982–1998	1	1	–	N/A	N/A	N/A
	Kristen Skjeldal		Norway	1989–2008	1	1	–	–	–	–
	Henrik Forsberg		Sweden	1988–1999	1	1	–	N/A	N/A	N/A
	Sture Sivertsen		Norway	1990–1999	1	1	–	N/A	N/A	N/A
	Ari Palolahti		Finland	1995–2005	1	–	1	N/A	N/A	N/A
	Espen Bjervig		Norway	1995–2003	1	1	N/A	N/A	N/A	
	Anders Bergström		Sweden	1989–1999	1	1	–	N/A	N/A	N/A
	Jan Jacob Verdenius		Norway	1993–2002	1	–	1	N/A	N/A	N/A
	Sergei Dolidovich		Belarus	1993–2018	1	1	–	–	–	–
	Mikael Östberg		Sweden	1998–2008	1	–	1	–	–	–
	Jörgen Brink		Sweden	1995–2011	1	1	–	–	–	–
	Janusz Krężelok		Poland	1995–2010	1	–	1	–	–	–
	Freddy Schwienbacher		Italy	1995–2009	1	–	1	–	–	–
	Martin Bajčičák		Slovakia	1995–2015	1	1	–	–	–	–
	Yevgeny Dementyev		Russia	2003–2016	1	1	–	–	–	–
	Tore Ruud Hofstad		Norway	2000–2009	1	1	–	–	–	–
	Daniel Tynell		Sweden	2004–2006	1	1	–	N/A	N/A	N/A
	Ole Einar Bjørndalen		Norway	1998–2010	1	1	–	–	–	–
	Christoph Eigenmann		Switzerland	2000–2013	1	–	–	–	–	1
	Franz Göring		Germany	2003–2014	1	–	–	–	1	–
	Toni Livers		Switzerland	2003–2020	1	1	–	–	–	–
	Mikhail Devyatyarov Jr.		Russia	2003–2016	1	–	1	–	–	–
	Josef Wenzl		Germany	2004–2016	1	–	1	–	–	–
	Emmanuel Jonnier		France	1999–2011	1	–	–	–	1	–
	Nikolay Pankratov		Russia	2003–2010	1	1	–	–	–	–
	Valerio Checchi		Italy	2001–2014	1	1	–	–	–	–
	Jean-Marc Gaillard		France	2001–2021	1	1	–	–	–	–
	Ivan Babikov		Canada	2005–2016	1	–	–	–	1	–
	Sami Jauhojärvi		Finland	2001–2017	1	1	–	–	–	–
	Ronny André Hafsås		Norway	2007–2011	1	1	–	–	–	–
	Artem Zhmurko		Russia	2010–2013	1	1	–	–	–	–
	Giorgio Di Centa		Italy	1993–2017	1	1	–	–	–	–
	Noah Hoffman		United States	2009–2018	1	–	–	–	1	–
	Simeon Hamilton		United States	2010–2021	1	–	–	–	–	1
	Chris André Jespersen		Norway	2003–	1	–	–	–	1	–
	Roland Clara		Italy	2005–2016	1	–	–	–	1	–
	Tomas Northug		Norway	2010–2017	1	–	1	–	–	–
	Francesco De Fabiani		Italy	2013–2026	1	1	–	–	–	–
	Sondre Turvoll Fossli		Norway	2011–2019	1	–	–	–	–	1
	Niklas Dyrhaug		Norway	2009–2019	1	–	–	–	1	–
	Baptiste Gros		France	2010–2020	1	–	–	–	–	1
	Gleb Retivykh		Russia	2011–	1	–	1	–	–	–
	Janosch Brugger		Germany	2017–	1	–	–	–	1	–
	Evgeniy Belov		Russia	2010–	1	1	–	–	–	–
	Denis Spitsov		Russia	2017–	1	–	–	–	1	–
	Alexander Terentyev		Russia	2019–	1	–	1	–	–	–
	Håvard Solås Taugbøl		Norway	2013–	1	–	1	–	–	–
	Jan Thomas Jenssen		Norway	2017–	1	1	–	–	–	–
	Perttu Hyvärinen		Finland	2011–2026	1	–	–	–	1	–
	Jules Lapierre		France	2017–	1	–	–	–	1	–
	Edvin Anger		Sweden	2022–	1	–	1	–	–	–
	William Poromaa		Sweden	2019–	1	1	–	–	–	–
	Lars Heggen		Norway	2025–	1	–	1	–	–	–
	Ansgar Evensen		Norway	2020–	1	–	1	–	–	–

- N/A: Disciplines hadn't existed throughout athlete's entire career.
- Ties are shown in chronological order.

== Milestones ==
Category	Achiever	Event	Date
Single Event
First to win 10 races	(Sweden) Gunde Svan	Distance	23 February 1985
First to win 20 races	(Sweden) Gunde Svan	Distance	27 February 1988
First to win 30 races	(Sweden) Gunde Svan	Distance	7 February 1991
First to win 40 races	(Norway) Bjørn Dæhlie	Distance	12 December 1998
First to win 50 races	(Norway) Johannes Høsflot Klæbo	Sprint	30 November 2024
First to win 60 races	(Norway) Johannes Høsflot Klæbo	Sprint	5 December 2025
Two Events
First to win a race	(Norway) Bjørn Dæhlie	Distance and Sprint	11 March 1997
First to win 10 races	(Norway) Johannes Høsflot Klæbo	Distance and Sprint	31 December 2021
First to win 20 races	(Norway) Johannes Høsflot Klæbo	Distance and Sprint	26 March 2023
First to win 30 races	(Norway) Johannes Høsflot Klæbo	Distance and Sprint	26 January 2025
All Three Events
First to win a race	(Norway) Petter Northug	Distance, Sprint and Stage Event	21 March 2010
First to win 10 races	(Norway) Johannes Høsflot Klæbo	Distance, Sprint and Stage Event	4 January 2026

== See also ==
- List of FIS Cross-Country World Cup women's race winners
