= Cross-country skiing at the 1984 Winter Olympics – Men's 4 × 10 kilometre relay =

Men's 4 × 10 km relay at the XIV Olympic Winter Games
- Cross-country skiing
- Venue: Igman
- Date: 16 February 1984
- Competitors: 68 from 17 nations
- Winning time: 1:55:06.3

Medalists
1st place, gold medalist(s)		Thomas Wassberg; Benny Kohlberg; Jan Ottosson; Gunde Svan	Sweden
2nd place, silver medalist(s)		Oleksandr Batyuk; Alexander Zavyalov; Vladimir Nikitin; Nikolay Zimyatov	Soviet Union
3rd place, bronze medalist(s)		Kari Ristanen; Juha Mieto; Harri Kirvesniemi; Aki Karvonen	Finland

The 4 × 10 kilometre cross-country skiing event was the only relay event of the men's cross-country skiing programme at the 1984 Winter Olympics, in Sarajevo, Yugoslavia. It was the eleventh appearance of the 4 × 10 km relay in the Winter Olympics. The competition was held on Thursday, 16 February 1984, at Veliko Polje, Igman.

It was the first time since 1964 that Sweden won the gold medal in the event. It was also the second gold medal won by Gunde Svan at the games, and the first of two won by Thomas Wassberg. The Mongolian team, who had dead-heated for 15th, was disqualified after Pürejavyn Batsükh tested positive for steroids.

== Results ==
Rank	Bib	Team	Time	Deficit
1st place, gold medalist(s)	5	Sweden; Thomas Wassberg; Benny Kohlberg; Jan Ottosson; Gunde Svan	1:55:06.3; 28:47.0; 28:47.9; 29:04.1; 28:27.3	–
2nd place, silver medalist(s)	1	Soviet Union; Alexander Batyuk; Alexander Zavyalov; Vladimir Nikitin; Nikolay Zimyatov	1:55:16.5; 28:57.6; 28:25.1; 29:15.8; 28:38.0	+10.2
3rd place, bronze medalist(s)	3	Finland; Kari Ristanen; Juha Mieto; Harri Kirvesniemi; Aki Karvonen	1:56:31.4; 30:21.6; 28:36.2; 28:35.0; 28:58.6	+1:25.1
4	2	Norway; Lars Erik Eriksen; Jan Lindvall; Ove Aunli; Tor Håkon Holte	1:57:27.6; 30:14.6; 28:43.7; 28:24.1; 30:05.2	+2:21.3
5	7	Switzerland; Giachem Guidon; Konrad Hallenbarter; Joos Ambühl; Andi Grünenfelder	1:58:06.0; 29:42.9; 29:48.7; 29:28.5; 29:05.9	+2:59.7
6	4	West Germany; Jochen Behle; Stefan Dötzler; Franz Schöbel; Peter Zipfel	1:59:30.2; 30:05.8; 29:54.7; 29:37.3; 29:52.4	+3:23.9
7	6	Italy; Maurilio De Zolt; Alfred Runggaldier; Giulio Capitanio; Giorgio Vanzetta	1:59:30.3; 30:21.4; 30:26.6; 29:47.0; 28:55.3	+3:24.0
8	8	United States; Dan Simoneau; Tim Caldwell; James Galanes; Bill Koch	1:59:52.3; 29:36.4; 31:43.0; 29:14.7; 29:18.2	+4:46.0
9	13	East Germany; Karsten Brandt; Uwe Wünsch; Frank Schröder; Uwe Bellmann	2:02:13.9; 32:06.3; 29:35.1; 30:48.0; 29:44.5	+7:07.6
10	10	Bulgaria; Svetoslav Atanasov; Atanas Simidchiev; Milush Ivanchev; Khristo Barzanov	2:03:17.6; 31:48.4; 30:25.5; 30:17.1; 30:46.6	+8:11.3
11	16	Austria; Andreas Gumpold; Franz Gatterman; Peter Juric; Alois Stadlober	2:04:39.0; 32:59.1; 30:59.7; 30:35.6; 30:04.6	+9:32.7
12	11	Yugoslavia; Ivo Čarman; Jože Klemenčić; Janež Kršinar; Dušan Đurišič	2:04:42.8; 31:38.2; 31:47.9; 30:49.4; 30:27.3	+9:36.5
13	9	Japan; Kazunari Sasaki; Hideaki Yamada; Satoshi Sato; Yusei Nakazawa	2:06:42.5; 32:54.0; 30:56.6; 31:14.1; 31:37.8	+11:36.2
14	12	Great Britain; Mark Moore; Andrew Rawlin; Mike Dixon; John Spotswood	2:10:19.9; 32:31.8; 32:19.3; 33:17.5; 32:01.3	+15:13.6
15	17	China; Song Shi; Li Xiaoming; Lin Guanghao; Zhu Dainfa	2:16:52.4; 34:12.8; 34:47.4; 34:00.8; 33:51.4	+21:46.1
16	14	Argentina; Julio Moreschi; Norberto von Baumann; Ricardo Holler; Alejandro Baratta	2:27:07.1; 37:05.9; 35:30.9; 37:29.3; 37:01.0	+32:00.8
DSQ	15	Mongolia; Pürejavyn Batsükh; Vangansürengiin Renchinkhorol; Dondogiin Gankhuyag; Luvsandashiin Dorj	2:16:01.6; 34:35.4; 35:09.3; 33:11.1; 33:05.8	+20:55.3
