= Cross-country skiing at the 1984 Winter Olympics – Men's 50 kilometre =

Men's 50 kilometre at the XIV Olympic Winter Games
- Venue: Igman
- Dates: 19 February 1984
- Competitors: 54 from 21 nations
- Winning time: 2:15:55.8

Medalists
1st place, gold medalist(s)		Thomas Wassberg; Sweden
2nd place, silver medalist(s)		Gunde Svan; Sweden
3rd place, bronze medalist(s)		Aki Karvonen; Finland

The men's 50 kilometre cross-country skiing competition at the 1984 Winter Olympics in Sarajevo, Yugoslavia, was held on Sunday 19 February at Veliko Polje, Igman. It was the last event of the men's cross-country skiing programme at these games and the fourteenth appearance of the 50 kilometre race as it had appeared in every Winter games. Thomas Wassberg of Sweden was the 1982 World champion and Nikolay Zimyatov of the Soviet Union was the defending champion from the 1980 Olympics in Lake Placid, United States.

Each skier started at half a minute intervals, skiing the entire 50 kilometre course. Of the 54 athletes who started the race, 4 did not finish. Thomas Wassberg of the Sweden took his second gold medal of the games after being part of Sweden's winning men's 4 x 10km relay team, and his third all-time gold medal. His fellow countryman Gunde Svan took silver and therefore won a medal in every cross-country event for men.

== Results ==
Rank	Bib	Name	Country	Time	Deficit
1st place, gold medalist(s)	48	Thomas Wassberg	Sweden	2:15:55.8	–
2nd place, silver medalist(s)	38	Gunde Svan	Sweden	2:16:00.7	+4.9
3rd place, bronze medalist(s)	46	Aki Karvonen	Finland	2:17:04.7	+1:08.9
4	43	Harri Kirvesniemi	Finland	2:18:34.1	+2:38.3
5	41	Jan Lindvall	Norway	2:19:27.1	+3:31.3
6	47	Andi Grünenfelder	Switzerland	2:19:46.2	+3:50.4
7	30	Alexander Zavyalov	Soviet Union	2:20:27.6	+4:31.8
8	19	Vladimir Sakhnov	Soviet Union	2:20:53.7	+4:57.9
9	40	Konrad Hallenbarter	Switzerland	2:21:11.6	+5:15.8
10	24	Juha Mieto	Finland	2:21:53.1	+5:57.3
11	8	Lars Erik Eriksen	Norway	2:22:09.6	+6:13.8
12	22	Tor Håkon Holte	Norway	2:22:12.7	+6:16.9
13	51	Nikolay Zimyatov	Soviet Union	2:22:15.0	+6:19.2
14	16	Jan Ottosson	Sweden	2:22:24.0	+6:28.2
15	7	Kari Ristanen	Finland	2:23:10.6	+7:14.8
16	12	Alexander Batyuk	Soviet Union	2:23:17.0	+7:21.2
17	14	Bill Koch	United States	2:24:02.4	+8:06.6
18	32	Audun Endestad	United States	2:24:14.4	+8:18.6
19	25	Giachem Guidon	Switzerland	2:24:25.9	+8:30.1
20	39	Pierre Harvey	Canada	2:25:04.1	+9:08.3
21	2	Gianfranco Polvara	Italy	2:25:07.6	+9:11.8
22	45	Maurilio De Zolt	Italy	2:25:14.9	+9:19.1
23	31	Miloš Bečvář	Czechoslovakia	2:25:23.7	+9:27.9
24	33	Alois Stadlober	Austria	2:25:26.3	+9:30.5
25	10	Markus Fähndrich	Switzerland	2:25:26.4	+9:30.6
26	21	Dan Simoneau	United States	2:25:43.1	+9:47.3
27	36	Józef Łuszczek	Poland	2:25:46.9	+9:51.1
28	44	Dominique Locatelli	France	2:26:21.3	+10:25.5
29	5	Franz Gattermann	Austria	2:26:40.8	+10:45.0
30	50	Giorgio Vanzetta	Italy	2:27:08.3	+11:12.5
31	55	Jim Galanes	United States	2:28:00.7	+12:04.9
32	15	Dušan Ðuričić	Yugoslavia	2:28:23.4	+12:27.6
33	27	Peter Juric	Austria	2:28:38.8	+12:43.0
34	29	Giulio Capitanio	Italy	2:28:51.7	+12:55.9
35	4	Josef Schneider	West Germany	2:29:29.5	+13:33.7
36	34	Janež Kršinar	Yugoslavia	2:30:16.2	+14:20.4
37	28	Franz Schöbel	West Germany	2:30:30.2	+14:34.4
38	42	Peter Zipfel	West Germany	2:30:57.7	+15:01.9
39	13	Anders Larsson	Sweden	2:31:43.6	+15:47.8
40	35	Milush Ivanchev	Bulgaria	2:32:15.9	+16:20.1
41	11	José Giro	Spain	2:33:31.5	+17:35.7
42	23	Jože Klemenčić	Yugoslavia	2:35:22.4	+19:26.6
43	37	Uwe Wünsch	East Germany	2:35:48.9	+19:53.1
44	9	Mark Moore	Great Britain	2:36:32.8	+20:37.0
45	20	John Spotswood	Great Britain	2:38:03.2	+22:07.4
46	17	Miguel Prat	Spain	2:38:07.0	+22:11.2
47	26	Satoshi Sato	Japan	2:39:43.1	+23:47.3
48	3	David Hislop	Australia	2:39:53.1	+23:57.3
49	18	Chris Allen	Australia	2:44:19.1	+28:23.3
50	1	Ricardo Holler	Argentina	3:05:41.2	+49:45.4
	6	Kazunari Sasaki	Japan	DNF	
	49	Atanas Simidchev	Bulgaria	DNF	
	53	Ove Aunli	Norway	DNF	
	54	Uwe Bellmann	East Germany	DNF	
	52	Jochen Behle	West Germany	DNS	
	56	Jean-Denis Jaussaud	France	DNS	
