= Cross-country skiing at the 1984 Winter Olympics – Men's 30 kilometre =

Men's 30km at the XIV Olympic Winter Games
- Cross-country skiing
- Venue: Igman
- Date: 10 February 1984
- Competitors: 72 from 26 nations
- Winning time: 1:28:56.3

Medalists
1st place, gold medalist(s)		Nikolay Zimyatov; Soviet Union
2nd place, silver medalist(s)		Alexander Zavyalov; Soviet Union
3rd place, bronze medalist(s)		Gunde Svan; Sweden

The 30 kilometre cross-country skiing event was part of the cross-country skiing programme at the 1984 Winter Olympics, in Sarajevo, Yugoslavia. It was the eighth appearance of the 30 km race. The competition was held on Friday, 10 February 1984, at Veliko Polje, Igman. Of the 72 athletes who started the race, three were disqualified.

Nikolay Zimyatov of the Soviet Union successfully defended his Olympic title. His fellow countryman Alexander Zavyalov took silver with Sweden's Gunde Svan taking bronze.

== Results ==
Rank	Name	Country	Time
1	Nikolay Zimyatov	Soviet Union	1:28:56.3
2	Alexander Zavyalov	Soviet Union	1:29:23.3
3	Gunde Svan	Sweden	1:29:35.7
4	Vladimir Sakhnov	Soviet Union	1:30:30.4
5	Aki Karvonen	Finland	1:30:59.7
6	Lars Erik Eriksen	Norway	1:31:24.8
7	Harri Kirvesniemi	Finland	1:31:37.4
8	Juha Mieto	Finland	1:31:48.3
9	Maurilio De Zolt	Italy	1:31:58.7
10	Uwe Bellmann	East Germany	1:31:59.3
11	Yuriy Burlakov	Soviet Union	1:32:19.6
12	Pål Gunnar Mikkelsplass	Norway	1:32:20.6
13	Jan Lindvall	Norway	1:32:23.3
14	Thomas Wassberg	Sweden	1:32:25.3
15	Jochen Behle	West Germany	1:32:58.7
16	Jan Ottosson	Sweden	1:33:01.3
17	Kari Ristanen	Finland	1:33:02.6
18	Dominique Locatelli	France	1:33:25.3
19	Andi Grünenfelder	Switzerland	1:33:26.4
20	Giachem Guidon	Switzerland	1:33:28.3
21	Pierre Harvey	Canada	1:33:44.4
21	Bill Koch	United States	1:33:44.4
23	Torgny Mogren	Sweden	1:33:52.0
24	Giorgio Vanzetta	Italy	1:33:54.3
25	Uwe Wünsch	East Germany	1:34:13.9
26	Giulio Capitanio	Italy	1:34:22.6
27	Miloš Bečvář	Czechoslovakia	1:34:37.2
28	Konrad Hallenbarter	Switzerland	1:35:23.2
29	Dan Simoneau	United States	1:35:50.7
30	Karsten Brandt	East Germany	1:35:54.8
31	Franz Gattermann	Austria	1:36:03.9
32	Oddvar Brå	Norway	1:32:23.4
33	Peter Zipfel	West Germany	1:32:26.6
34	Pavel Benc	Czechoslovakia	1:36:30.3
35	Peter Juric	Austria	1:37:06.6
36	Jim Galanes	United States	1:37:21.2
37	Stefan Dotzler	West Germany	1:37:39.9
38	Jože Klemenčič	Yugoslavia	1:37:40.1
39	Gottlieb Konráðsson	Iceland	1:37:48.2
40	Ivo Čarman	Yugoslavia	1:38:09.6
41	Józef Łuszczek	Poland	1:38:11.7
42	Jean-Denis Jaussaud	France	1:38:48.1
43	Frank Schröder	East Germany	1:39:01.4
44	Dušan Đurišič	Yugoslavia	1:39:04.6
45	Milush Ivanchev	Bulgaria	1:39:16.4
46	Daniel Sandoz	Switzerland	1:39:18.6
47	Kevin Brochman	United States	1:39:24.6
48	Svetoslav Atanasov	Bulgaria	1:39:25.8
49	Einar Ólafsson	Iceland	1:39:32.2
50	Mark Moore	Great Britain	1:40:22.2
51	Janež Kršinar	Yugoslavia	1:40:45.5
52	Andrew Rawlin	Great Britain	1:41:33.9
53	Khristo Barzanov	Bulgaria	1:41:39.9
54	John Spotswood	Great Britain	1:42:23.3
55	Luvsandashiin Dorj	Mongolia	1:43:03.1
56	José Giro	Spain	1:43:18.8
57	David Hislop	Australia	1:43:46.2
58	Stephen Daglish	Great Britain	1:44:04.3
59	Chris Allen	Australia	1:45:07.7
60	Park Ki-ho	South Korea	1:45.41.9
61	Vangansürengiin Renchinkhorol	Mongolia	1:47:04.4
62	Song Shi	China	1:47:13.5
63	Dondogiin Gankhuyag	Mongolia	1:47:32.5
64	Li Xiaoming	China	1:47:32.6
65	Miguel Prat	Spain	1:48:46.3
66	Cho Sung-Hoon	South Korea	1:50:32.1
67	Ricardo Holler	Argentina	2:02:00.4
68	Alejandro Baratta	Argentina	2:09:33.1
69	Andrea Sammaritani	San Marino	2:26:55.9
DQ	Alfred Runggaldier	Italy	DQ
DQ	Arturo Kinch	Costa Rica	DQ
DQ	Pürevjavyn Batsükh	Mongolia	DQ
