= Joos Ambühl =

Swiss cross-country skier

Personal information
- Nationality: Switzerland
- Born: 23 November 1959 (age 66) Davos, Switzerland

Sport
- Sport: Skiing

World Cup career
- Seasons: 6 – (1982–1987)
- Indiv. starts: 23
- Indiv. podiums: 0
- Team starts: 1
- Team podiums: 1
- Team wins: 0
- Overall titles: 0 – (45th in 1984)

Joos Ambuehl (born 23 October 1959 in Davos) is a Swiss cross-country skier who competed in 1984. He finished fifth in the 4 × 10 km relay event at the 1984 Winter Olympics in Sarajevo.

His best World Cup finish was 15th in a 15 km event in Finland that year.

== Cross-country skiing results ==
All results are sourced from the International Ski Federation (FIS).

=== Olympic Games ===
Year	Age	15 km	30 km	50 km	4 × 10 km relay
1984	24	—	—	—	5

=== World Championships ===
Year	Age	15 km	30 km	50 km	4 × 10 km relay
1982	22	38	—	31	—
1985	25	37	—	—	—

=== World Cup ===
==== Season standings ====
Season	Age	Overall
1982	22	NC
1983	23	NC
1984	24	45
1985	25	NC
1986	26	NC
1987	27	NC

==== Team podiums ====
- 1 podium

No.	Season	Date	Location	Race	Level	Place	Teammates
1	1986–87	14 December 1986	Cogne, Italy	4 × 10 km Relay F	World Cup	3rd	Wigger / Guidon / Bovisi
