= Anders Larsson (cross-country skier) =

Swedish cross-country skier (born 1961)

Personal information
- Nationality: Sweden
- Born: October 3, 1961 Karlstad, Sweden

Sport
- Sport: Skiing
- Club: Bondsjöhöjdens IK

World Cup career
- Seasons: 3 – (1982, 1984, 1988)
- Indiv. starts: 4
- Indiv. podiums: 0
- Team starts: 0
- Overall titles: 0 – (33rd in 1988)
Medal record
Men's cross-country skiing
Representing Sweden
Junior World Championships
Silver medal – second place	1981 Schonach	3 × 5 km relay

Anders Larsson (born 3 October 1961 in Karlstad, Sweden) is a Swedish former cross-country skier representing Bondsjöhöjdens IK in club competitions during his career.

He also participated at the 1984 Olympic Winter Games in Sarajevo, finishing 39th in the 50 kilometers race. He also won Vasaloppet in 1987 and in 1982 he was awarded the Sixten Jernberg Award.

== Cross-country skiing results ==
All results are sourced from the International Ski Federation (FIS).

=== Olympic Games ===
Year	Age	15 km	30 km	50 km	4 × 10 km relay
1984	22	—	—	39	—

=== World Championships ===
Year	Age	15 km	30 km	50 km	4 × 10 km relay
1982	20	—	—	18	—
1985	23	—	—	23	—

=== World Cup ===
==== Season standings ====
Season	Age	Overall
1982	20	25
1984	22	NC
1988	26	33
