= Tim Caldwell (skier) =

American cross-country skier (born 1954)

Personal information
- Nationality: United States
- Born: February 4, 1954 (age 72) Brattleboro, Vermont, U.S.

Sport
- Sport: Skiing
- Club: Putney Ski Club

World Cup career
- Seasons: 3 – (1982–1984)
- Indiv. starts: 11
- Indiv. podiums: 1
- Indiv. wins: 0
- Team starts: 1
- Team podiums: 0
- Overall titles: 0 – (25th in 1983)

Timothy John Caldwell (born February 4, 1954, in Brattleboro, Vermont) is an American former cross-country skier who competed from 1972 to 1984. He is the eldest son of Olympic cross-country skiing veteran John H. Caldwell.

Competing in four Winter Olympics, he earned his best finish of sixth in the 4 × 10 km relay at the 1976 Winter Olympics in Innsbruck. Caldwell also finished 15th in the 50 km event at the 1982 FIS Nordic World Ski Championships in Oslo. His best World Cup finish was second in a 15 km event in the United States in 1983.

== Cross-country skiing results ==
All results are sourced from the International Ski Federation (FIS).

=== Olympic Games ===
Year	Age	15 km	30 km	50 km	4 × 10 km relay
1972	18	54	—	—	12
1976	22	37	27	DNF	6
1980	26	25	—	—	8
1984	30	39	—	—	8

=== World Championships ===
Year	Age	15 km	30 km	50 km	4 × 10 km relay
1978	24	20	34	—	9
1982	28	—	—	15	—

=== World Cup ===
==== Season standings ====
Season	Age	Overall
1982	28	28
1983	29	25
1984	30	NC

==== Individual podiums ====
- 1 podium

No.	Season	Date	Location	Race	Level	Place
1	1982–83	19 March 1983	Anchorage, United States	15 km Individual	World Cup	2nd
