= Konrad Hallenbarter =

Swiss cross-country skier

Personal information
- Nationality: Switzerland
- Born: 1 December 1953 (age 72) Obergesteln, Switzerland

Sport
- Sport: Skiing
- Club: SC Obergoms

World Cup career
- Seasons: 5 – 1982–1985, 1988
- Indiv. starts: 26
- Indiv. podiums: 0
- Team starts: 3
- Team podiums: 0
- Overall titles: 0 – (23rd in 1984)

Konrad Hallenbarter (born December 1, 1953, in Obergesteln) is a Swiss cross-country skier who competed in the 1980s. At the 1984 Winter Olympics in Sarajevo, he finished fifth in the 4 x 10 km relay and ninth in the 50 km events.

Hallenbarter's best individual finish at the FIS Nordic World Ski Championships was tenth in the 30 km event at Seefeld in 1985. His best World Cup finish was fifth in a 30 km event in Austria in 1983.

In 1983, he won Vasaloppet. Hallenbarter was the first man to complete the race in under 4 hours, with a time of 3.58.08.

== Cross-country skiing results ==
All results are sourced from the International Ski Federation (FIS).

=== Olympic Games ===
Year	Age	15 km	30 km	50 km	4 × 10 km relay
1980	26	29	—	DNF	7
1984	30	28	28	9	5
1988	34	DNF	—	—	—

=== World Championships ===
Year	Age	15 km	30 km	50 km	4 × 10 km relay
1978	24	—	43	17	—
1982	28	—	36	17	9
1985	31	31	10	18	5

=== World Cup ===
==== Season standings ====
Season	Age	Overall
1982	28	59
1983	29	38
1984	30	23
1985	31	43
1988	34	NC
