= Franz Schöbel =

German cross-country skier (born 1956)

Personal information
- Nationality: Germany
- Born: 6 April 1956 (age 70) Weilheim, West Germany

Sport
- Sport: Skiing

World Cup career
- Seasons: 2 – (1982, 1984)
- Indiv. starts: 4
- Indiv. podiums: 0
- Team starts: 2
- Team podiums: 0
- Overall titles: 0 – (65th in 1982)

Franz Schöbel (born 6 April 1956 in Weilheim, Bavaria) is a German cross-country skier who competed from 1980 to 1984. He finished sixth in the 4 × 10 km relay at the 1984 Winter Olympics in Sarajevo.

Schöbel's best World Cup career finish was 16th in a 15 km event in Switzerland in 1983.

== Cross-country skiing results ==
All results are sourced from the International Ski Federation (FIS).

=== Olympic Games ===
Year	Age	15 km	30 km	50 km	4 × 10 km relay
1980	23	—	—	28	—
1984	27	33	—	37	6

=== World Championships ===
Year	Age	15 km	30 km	50 km	4 × 10 km relay
1982	25	—	—	—	6

=== World Cup ===
==== Season standings ====
Season	Age	Overall
1982	25	65
1984	27	NC
