= Oleksandr Batyuk =

Soviet cross-country skier

Personal information
- Nationality: Ukraine
- Born: 14 January 1960 (age 66) Chernihiv, Ukrainian SSR, Soviet Union

Sport
- Sport: Skiing

World Cup career
- Seasons: 1982–1988
- Indiv. starts: 23
- Indiv. podiums: 0
- Team starts: 5
- Team podiums: 4
- Team wins: 1
- Overall titles: 0 – (13th in 1983)
Medal record
Men's cross-country skiing
Representing Soviet Union
Olympic Games
Silver medal – second place	1984 Sarajevo	4 × 10 km relay
World Championships
Gold medal – first place	1982 Oslo	4 × 10 km relay
Silver medal – second place	1987 Oberstdorf	4 × 10 km relay

Oleksandr Mykhailovych Batyuk (Ukrainian: Олекса́ндр Миха́йлович Батю́к; born 14 January 1960) is a former Soviet cross-country skier who competed in the 1980s, training at Dynamo in Chernihiv. He won a silver in the 4 × 10 km relay at the 1984 Winter Olympics in Sarajevo. He is a member of the Ski Federation of Ukraine and the only Olympian of the federation who received medal at Olympics.

Batyuk also won two medals in the 4 × 10 km relay at the FIS Nordic World Ski Championships with a gold in 1982 (tied with Norway) and a silver in 1987.

His best individual finish was sixth twice in the World Cup (1984, 1986).

He was born in Chernihiv, Soviet Union.

== Cross-country skiing results ==
All results are sourced from the International Ski Federation (FIS).

=== Olympic Games ===
- 1 medal – (1 silver)

Year	Age	15 km	30 km	50 km	4 × 10 km relay
1984	24	10	—	16	Silver
1988	28	15	—	—	—

=== World Championships ===
- 2 medals – (1 gold, 1 silver)

Year	Age	15 km	30 km	50 km	4 × 10 km relay
1982	22	5	—	4	Gold
1985	25	13	14	11	6
1987	27	8	—	—	Silver

=== World Cup ===
==== Season standings ====
Season	Age	Overall
1982	22	25
1983	23	13
1984	24	26
1985	25	15
1986	26	37
1987	27	14
1988	28	36

==== Team podiums ====
- 1 victory
- 4 podiums

No.	Season	Date	Location	Race	Level	Place	Teammates
1	1981–82	25 February 1982	Oslo, Norway	4 × 10 km Relay	World Championships^{[1]}	1st	Nikitin / Burlakov / Zavyalov
2	1983–84	16 February 1984	(Socialist Federal Republic of Yugoslavia) Sarajevo, Yugoslavia	4 × 10 km Relay	Olympic Games^{[1]}	2nd	Zavyalov / Nikitin / Zimyatov
3	1986–87	17 February 1987	Oberstdorf, West Germany	4 × 10 km Relay F	World Championships^{[1]}	2nd	Smirnov / Devyatyarov / Sakhnov
4	1986–87	8 March 1987	Falun, Sweden	4 × 10 km Relay C	World Cup	2nd	Sakhnov / Uschkalenko / Prokurorov

Note: ^{1} Until the 1999 World Championships and the 1994 Winter Olympics, World Championship and Olympic races were included in the World Cup scoring system.
