= Stefan Dotzler =

German cross-country skier (born 1960)

Personal information
- Nationality: Germany
- Born: 10 December 1960 (age 65) Munich, West Germany

Sport
- Sport: Skiing
- Club: SC Hochvogel

World Cup career
- Seasons: 6 – (1982–1984, 1988–1990)
- Indiv. starts: 15
- Indiv. podiums: 1
- Indiv. wins: 0
- Team starts: 3
- Team podiums: 0
- Overall titles: 0 – (17th in 1983)

Stefan Dotzler (born 10 December 1960 in Munich) is a German cross-country skier who competed from 1982 to 1988. At the 1984 Winter Olympics in Sarajevo, he finished sixth in the 4 × 10 km relay, 30th in the 15 km event and 37th in the 30 km event. He also participated in the 1988 Winter Olympics in Calgary, finishing 40th in the 30 km event.

Dotzler's best World Cup career finish was third in a 15 km event in West Germany in 1983.

He trained his son Hannes Dotzler.

== Cross-country skiing results ==
All results are sourced from the International Ski Federation (FIS).

=== Olympic Games ===
| Year | Age | 15 km | 30 km | 50 km | 4 × 10 km relay |
|---|---|---|---|---|---|
| 1984 | 23 | 30 | 37 | — | 6 |
| 1988 | 27 | — | 40 | — | — |

=== World Championships ===
| Year | Age | 10 km | 15 km classical | 15 km freestyle | 30 km | 50 km | 4 × 10 km relay |
|---|---|---|---|---|---|---|---|
| 1982 | 21 | —N/a | — | —N/a | — | — | 6 |
| 1985 | 24 | —N/a | 24 | —N/a | — | — | — |
| 1987 | 26 | —N/a | 24 | —N/a | — | — | 11 |
| 1989 | 28 | —N/a | 22 | — | 22 | — | 10 |
| 1991 | 30 | 47 | —N/a | — | 29 | — | — |

=== World Cup ===
==== Season standings ====
| Season | Age | Overall |
|---|---|---|
| 1982 | 21 | 66 |
| 1983 | 22 | 17 |
| 1984 | 23 | 40 |
| 1988 | 27 | NC |
| 1989 | 28 | NC |
| 1990 | 29 | NC |

=== Individual podiums ===
- 1 podium

| No. | Season | Date | Location | Race | Level | Place |
|---|---|---|---|---|---|---|
| 1 | 1982–83 | 14 January 1983 | Reit im Winkl, West Germany | 15 km Individual | World Cup | 3rd |
