= Vladimir Nikitin (skier) =

Soviet cross-country skier

Personal information
- Nationality: Russia
- Born: 14 July 1959 (age 67) Udmurt ASSR, Soviet Union

Sport
- Sport: Skiing

World Cup career
- Seasons: 6 – (1982–1987)
- Indiv. starts: 12
- Indiv. podiums: 0
- Team starts: 2
- Team podiums: 2
- Team wins: 1
- Overall titles: 0 – (8th in 1983)
Medal record
Men's cross-country skiing
Representing Soviet Union
Olympic Games
| Silver medal – second place | 1984 Sarajevo | 4 × 10 km relay |
World Championships
| Gold medal – first place | 1982 Oslo | 4 × 10 km relay |

Vladimir Vasilyevich Nikitin (Russian: Влади́мир Васи́льевич Ники́тин; born 14 July 1959) is a former Soviet cross-country skier who competed in the 1980s, training at Zenit. He won a silver in the 4 × 10 km relay at the 1984 Winter Olympics in Sarajevo.

Nikitin also won a gold medal in the 4 × 10 km relay at the 1982 FIS Nordic World Ski Championships (tied with Norway).

His best individual finish was fourth in the 1983 World Cup event in Canada.

== Cross-country skiing results ==
All results are sourced from the International Ski Federation (FIS).

=== Olympic Games ===
- 1 medal – (1 silver)

| Year | Age | 15 km | 30 km | 50 km | 4 × 10 km relay |
|---|---|---|---|---|---|
| 1984 | 24 | 5 | — | — | 2nd |

=== World Championships ===
- 1 medal – (1 gold)

| Year | Age | 15 km | 30 km | 50 km | 4 × 10 km relay |
|---|---|---|---|---|---|
| 1982 | 22 | — | 8 | — | 1st |

=== World Cup ===
Season standings
| Season | Age | Overall |
|---|---|---|
| 1982 | 22 | 37 |
| 1983 | 23 | 8 |
| 1984 | 24 | 38 |
| 1985 | 25 | 45 |
| 1986 | 26 | 46 |
| 1987 | 27 | 47 |

==== Team podiums ====
- 1 victory
- 2 podiums

| No. | Season | Date | Location | Race | Level | Place | Teammates |
|---|---|---|---|---|---|---|---|
| 1 | 1981–82 | 25 February 1982 | Oslo, Norway | 4 × 10 km Relay | World Championships^{[1]} | 1st | Batyuk / Burlakov / Zavyalov |
| 2 | 1983–84 | 16 February 1984 | (Socialist Federal Republic of Yugoslavia) Sarajevo, Yugoslavia | 4 × 10 km Relay | Olympic Games^{[1]} | 2nd | Batyuk / Zavyalov / Zimyatov |

Note: ^{1} Until the 1999 World Championships and the 1994 Winter Olympics, World Championship and Olympic races were included in the World Cup scoring system.
