= Jim Galanes =

American cross-country skier (born 1956)

Personal information
- Nationality: United States
- Born: August 28, 1956 (age 69) Brattleboro, Vermont, U.S.

Sport
- Sport: Skiing
- Club: Brattleboro Outing Club

World Cup career
- Seasons: 4 – (1982–1984, 1986)
- Indiv. starts: 17
- Indiv. podiums: 0
- Team starts: 1
- Team podiums: 0
- Overall titles: 0 – (21st in 1984)

James Barrett Galanes (born August 28, 1956, in Brattleboro, Vermont) is an American former Nordic combined and cross-country skier. He competed at the 1976 Winter Olympics, the 1980 Winter Olympics, and the 1984 Winter Olympics.

Galanes finished 14th in the 30 km event at the 1982 FIS Nordic World Ski Championships in Oslo. His best World Cup finish was fifth in a 15 km event in the Soviet Union in 1984.

== Cross-country skiing results ==
All results are sourced from the International Ski Federation (FIS).

=== Olympic Games ===
Year	Age	15 km	30 km	50 km	4 × 10 km relay
1980	23	33	41	20	8
1984	27	—	36	31	8

=== World Championships ===
Year	Age	15 km	30 km	50 km	4 × 10 km relay
1982	25	—	14	—	—

=== World Cup ===
==== Season standings ====
Season	Age	Overall
1982	25	23
1983	26	26
1984	27	21
1986	29	49
