= Yuriy Burlakov =

Russian cross-country skier

Personal information
- Nationality: Russia; Switzerland
- Born: 31 January 1960 (age 66) Khabarovsk, Soviet Union

Sport
- Sport: Skiing

World Cup career
- Seasons: 8 – (1982–1989)
- Indiv. starts: 26
- Indiv. podiums: 4
- Indiv. wins: 0
- Team starts: 2
- Team podiums: 1
- Team wins: 1
- Overall titles: 0 – (7th in 1983)
Medal record
Men's cross-country skiing
Representing Soviet Union
World Championships
Gold medal – first place	1982 Oslo	4 × 10 km relay
Silver medal – second place	1982 Oslo	50 km
Junior World Championships
Gold medal – first place	1980 Örnsköldsvik	3 × 5 km relay
Silver medal – second place	1980 Örnsköldsvik	15 km

Yuriy Ilyich Burlakov (Russian: Юрий Ильич Бурлаков); born 1960) is a former Soviet/Russian cross-country skier who competed from 1982 to 1997. He won two medals at the 1982 FIS Nordic World Ski Championships with a gold in the 4 × 10 km relay (Tied with Norway) and a silver in the 50 km.

Burlakov also finished 12th in the 30 km event in both the 1984 Winter Olympics and the 1988 Winter Olympics.

== Cross-country skiing results ==
All results are sourced from the International Ski Federation (FIS).

=== Olympic Games ===
Year	Age	15 km	30 km	50 km	4 × 10 km relay
1984	24	—	11	—	—
1988	28	—	12	26	—

=== World Championships ===
- 2 medals – (1 gold, 1 silver)

Year	Age	15 km	30 km	50 km	4 × 10 km relay
1982	22	4	7	2nd	1st
1985	25	—	23	12	6
1987	27	10	—	—	—

=== World Cup ===
Season Standings
Season	Age	Overall
1982	22	10
1983	23	7
1984	24	14
1985	25	36
1986	26	18
1987	27	40
1988	28	43
1989	29	57

==== Individual Podiums ====
- 4 podiums

No.	Season	Date	Location	Race	Level	Place
1	1981–82	27 February 1982	Oslo, Norway	50 km Individual	World Championships^{[1]}	2nd
2	1982–83	18 December 1982	Davos, Switzerland	15 km Individual	World Cup	3rd
3	1982–83	20 February 1983	Kavgolovo, Soviet Union	50 km Individual	World Cup	3rd
4	1985–86	23 February 1986	Kavgolovo, Soviet Union	15 km Individual C	World Cup	3rd

==== Team Podiums ====
- 1 victory
- 1 podium

No.	Season	Date	Location	Race	Level	Place	Teammates
1	1981–82	25 February 1982	Oslo, Norway	4 × 10 km Relay	World Championships (Note: Until the 1999 World Championships, World Championship races were included in the World Cup scoring system.)	1st	Nikitin / Batyuk / Zavyalov
