= John H. Caldwell =

Cross-country skier, coach and author (1928–2026)

John Caldwell
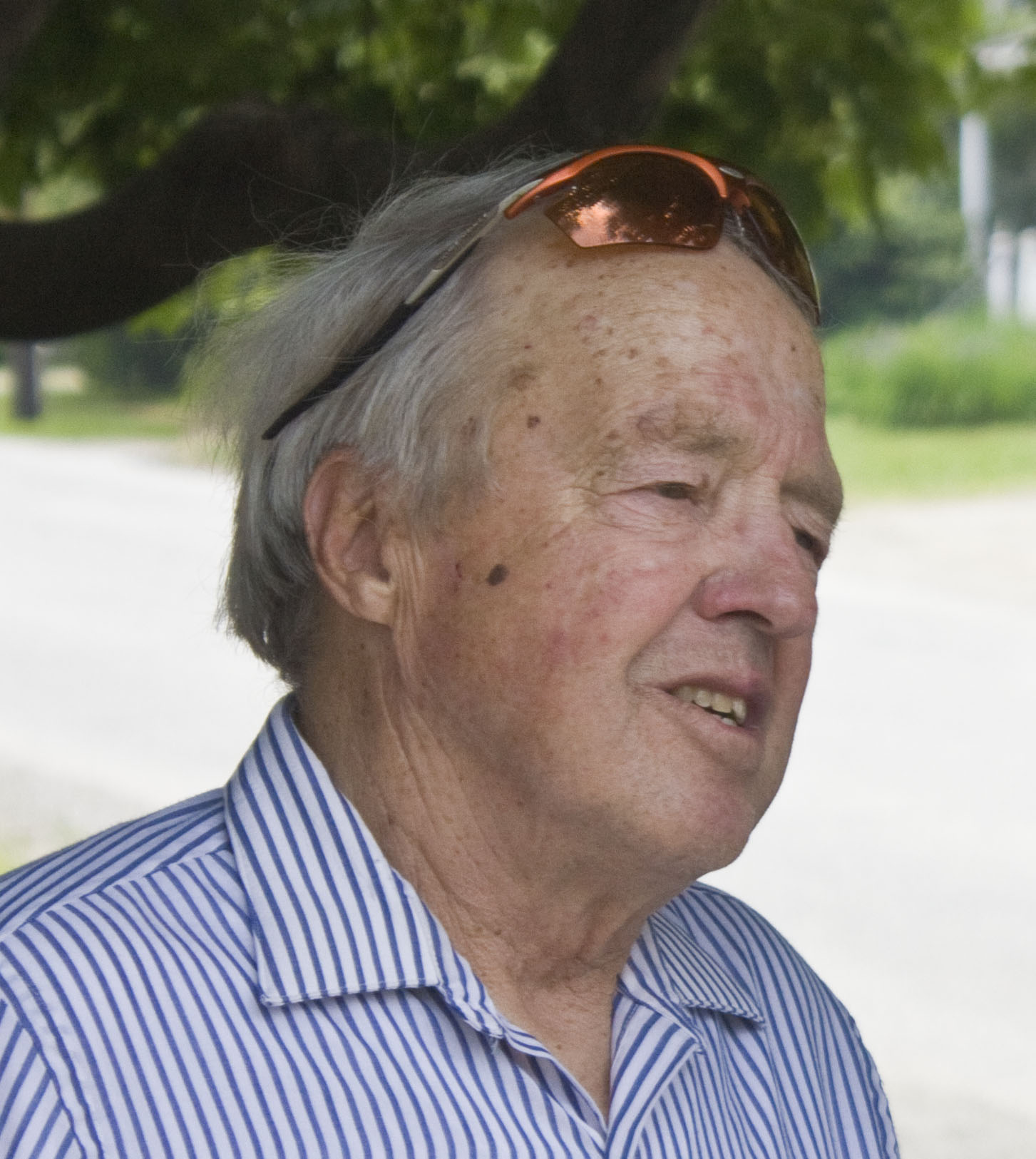
- Caldwell in 2009
- Born: John Homer Caldwell; November 28, 1928; Detroit, Michigan, U.S.
- Died: February 27, 2026 (aged 97)
- Education: Dartmouth College
- Occupations: Cross-country skier, teacher, coach, and author
- Employer(s): United States Ski Team, Putney School
- Known for: Promotion of cross-country skiing in the United States

John Homer Caldwell (November 28, 1928 – February 27, 2026) was an American Nordic skier who competed in the 1952 Winter Olympics, then became a cross-country ski coach and authority on cross-country skiing. He wrote a series of books that helped popularize and develop understanding of recreational cross-country skiing in the United States. Consequently, Caldwell has been called the "father" and "guru" of Nordic skiing in North America.

== Background ==
Born in Detroit, Michigan, Caldwell grew up in Somerset, Pennsylvania, and moved to Putney, Vermont, with his parents in 1941. He graduated from Dartmouth College in 1950. Caldwell and his wife, Hep (née Hester Goodenough), had four children, Tim, Sverre, Peter, and Jennifer.

As of 2014, Caldwell resided in Putney, Vermont. He died on February 27, 2026, at the age of 97.

== Career ==
Caldwell served variously as a U.S. Ski Team coach, Putney School math teacher and coach, author on cross-country skiing topics, and founder of the New England Nordic Ski Association (NENSA). Caldwell is credited with helping start up the U.S. women's cross-country skiing program.

According to his reminiscences, Caldwell's early skiing career began while he was at Dartmouth College when he had an opportunity to participate in the World Nordic Championships in Nordic Combined skiing (both cross-country and ski-jumping). He entered the U.S. Navy through Dartmouth ROTC and was detailed to continue his skiing career. Having placed well in Olympic tryouts, he qualified for the 1952 Olympic Nordic Combined Team. Caldwell competed in the 1952 Winter Olympics in Oslo, finishing 22nd in the Nordic combined event and 73rd in the 18km cross-country skiing event.

Caldwell coached the U.S. cross-country team at the Winter Olympics in 1960, 1964, 1968, 1972, and 1984. He also coached at the Putney School from the mid-1950s until his 1989 retirement. Among the Putney students that he coached, who skied for the U.S. Cross-Country Ski Team, were Bob Gray (1968 and 1972 Winter Olympics), Martha Rockwell (1972 and 1976 Winter Olympics), Mike Gallagher (1964, 1968 and 1972 Winter Olympics), his own children, and Bill Koch, the first American medal in cross country skiing—both at the Winter Olympics (30km silver: 1976 Innsbruck) and at the FIS Nordic World Ski Championships (30km bronze: 1982 Oslo).

== Legacy ==
Caldwell's book, The Cross-Country Ski Book, was published in eight editions from 1964 to 1987 and with a half-million copies became one of the most widely distributed skiing books, published in the United States. He was inducted into the U.S. Ski and Snowboard Hall of Fame in 1983 and into the Vermont Sports Hall of Fame in April 2017, along with one-time mentee Martha Rockwell.

Caldwell's progeny continued the tradition of cross-country skiing. His eldest son, Tim, competed in four Winter Olympics from (1972 through 1984). His daughter, Jennifer, was the women's champion of the 1983 American Birkebeiner. His son, Sverre, is a noted cross-country ski coach whose daughter, Sophie, finished sixth in the sprint freestyle event at the 2014 Winter Olympics in Sochi, Russia, the highest finish by a U.S. woman in Olympic cross-country skiing at that time.

== Partial bibliography ==
In addition to writing on cross-country skiing for magazines and on line, Caldwell was the author of the following books:

- The cross-country ski book. Brattleboro, Vermont: Stephen Greene Press. 1971. pp. 182. ISBN 0828904545.
- The new cross-country ski book. Brattleboro, Vermont: Stephen Greene Press. 1973. pp. 144. ISBN 0828901872.
- Caldwell on cross-country training and technique for the serious skier. Brattleboro, Vermont: Stephen Greene Press. 1975. pp. 157. ISBN 0828902550.
- Cross-Country Skiing Today. Brattleboro, Vermont: Stephen Greene Press. 1977. pp. 176. ISBN 0828903158.
- Caldwell on Competitive Cross-Country Skiing. New York: Penguin Books. 1979. pp. 192. ISBN 0828903603.
- Cross-country skiing. New York: Penguin Books. 1981. pp. 192. ISBN 0828904553.
