= Aki Karvonen =

Finnish cross-country skier

Personal information
- Nationality: Finland
- Born: August 31, 1957 (age 68) Valtimo, Finland

Sport
- Sport: Skiing
- Club: Ilomantsin Urheilijat

World Cup career
- Seasons: 8 – (1982–1989)
- Indiv. starts: 23
- Indiv. podiums: 3
- Indiv. wins: 0
- Team starts: 6
- Team podiums: 5
- Team wins: 0
- Overall titles: 0 – (11th in 1984)
Medal record
Men's cross-country skiing
Representing Finland
Olympic Games
Silver medal – second place	1984 Sarajevo	15 km
Bronze medal – third place	1984 Sarajevo	50 km
Bronze medal – third place	1984 Sarajevo	4 × 10 km relay
World Championships
Silver medal – second place	1987 Oberstdorf	30 km classical
Silver medal – second place	1989 Lahti	4 × 10 km relay
Bronze medal – third place	1982 Oslo	4 × 10 km relay

Aki Tapani Karvonen (born 31 August 1957 in Valtimo) is a Finnish former cross-country skier who competed during the 1980s. He won three medals at the 1984 Winter Olympics in Sarajevo, with a silver in the 15 km, and two bronze medals in 50 km and the 4 × 10 km relay, respectively.

Karvonen also won three medals at the FIS Nordic World Ski Championships, with two silver medals (30 km: 1987, 4 × 10 km relay: 1989) and one bronze (4 × 10 km relay: 1982, tied with East Germany).

== Doping ==
Karvonen admitted in May 1985 that he had had a blood transfusion before the 1985 World Championships. In 1994 Karvonen admitted that he had also had have blood transfusions also for the 1984 Winter Olympics.

== Cross-country skiing results ==
All results are sourced from the International Ski Federation (FIS).

=== Olympic Games ===
- 3 medals – (1 silver, 2 bronze)

Year	Age	15 km	30 km	50 km	4 × 10 km relay
1984	26	Silver	5	Bronze	Bronze
1988	30	20	19	—	—

=== World Championships ===
- 3 medals – (2 silver, 1 bronze)

Year	Age	15 km classical	15 km freestyle	30 km	50 km	4 × 10 km relay
1982	24	14	—N/a	10	—	Bronze
1985	27	12	—N/a	6	—	—
1987	29	15	—N/a	Silver	—	—
1989	31	4	—	32	—	Silver

=== World Cup ===
==== Season standings ====
Season	Age	Overall
1982	24	31
1983	25	45
1984	26	11
1985	27	26
1986	28	28
1987	29	25
1988	30	NC
1989	31	31

==== Individual podiums ====
- 3 podiums

No.	Season	Date	Location	Race	Level	Place
1	1983–84	13 February 1984	(Socialist Federal Republic of Yugoslavia) Sarajevo, Yugoslavia	15 km Individual	Olympic Games^{[1]}	2nd
2	1983–84	19 February 1984	(Socialist Federal Republic of Yugoslavia) Sarajevo, Yugoslavia	50 km Individual	Olympic Games^{[1]}	3rd
3	1986–87	12 February 1987	Oberstdorf, West Germany	30 km Individual C	World Championships^{[1]}	2nd

==== Team podiums ====
- 5 podiums

No.	Season	Date	Location	Race	Level	Place	Teammate(s)
1	1981–82	25 February 1982	Oslo, Norway	4 × 10 km Relay	World Championships^{[1]}	3rd	Härkönen / Kirvesniemi / Mieto
2	1983–84	16 February 1984	(Socialist Federal Republic of Yugoslavia) Sarajevo, Yugoslavia	4 × 10 km Relay	Olympic Games^{[1]}	3rd	Ristanen / Mieto / Kirvesniemi
3	1985–86	9 March 1986	Falun, Sweden	4 × 10 km Relay F	World Cup	3rd	Hynninen / Ristanen / Kirvesniemi
4	1986–87	19 March 1987	Oslo, Norway	4 × 10 km Relay C	World Cup	2nd	Laukkanen / Kirvesniemi / Ristanen
5	1988–89	24 February 1989	Lahti, Finland	4 × 10 km Relay C/F	World Championships^{[1]}	2nd	Kirvesniemi / Ristanen / Räsänen

Note: ^{1} Until the 1999 World Championships and the 1994 Olympics, World Championship and Olympic races were included in the World Cup scoring system.
