= Dan Simoneau =

American cross-country skier (born 1959)

Personal information
- Nationality: United States
- Born: January 9, 1959 (age 67) Farmington, Maine, United States

Sport
- Sport: Skiing

World Cup career
- Seasons: 5 – (1982–1985, 1988)
- Indiv. starts: 18
- Indiv. podiums: 1
- Indiv. wins: 0
- Team starts: 2
- Team podiums: 0
- Overall titles: 0 – (7th in 1982)

Daniel Owen Simoneau (born January 9, 1959, in Farmington, Maine) is an American former cross-country skier who competed from 1982 to 1984. At the 1984 Winter Olympics in Sarajevo, he finished eighth in the 4 × 10 km relay and 18th in the 15 km event.

Simoneau's best World Cup career finish was second in a 30 km event in Sweden in 1982.

== Cross-country skiing results ==
All results are sourced from the International Ski Federation (FIS).

=== Olympic Games ===
Year	Age	15 km	30 km	50 km	4 × 10 km relay
1984	25	18	29	26	8
1988	29	29	49	DNF	13

=== World Championships ===
Year	Age	15 km	30 km	50 km	4 × 10 km relay
1982	23	—	—	21	—

=== World Cup ===
==== Season standings ====
Season	Age	Overall
1982	23	7
1983	24	54
1984	25	40
1985	26	NC
1988	29	NC

==== Individual podiums ====
- 1 podium

No.	Season	Date	Location	Race	Level	Place
1	1981–82	12 March 1982	Falun, Sweden	30 km Individual	World Cup	2nd
