= Australia at the 1984 Winter Olympics =

- IOC code: AUS
- NOC: Australian Olympic Committee
- Website: www.olympics.com.au

in Sarajevo
- Competitors: 10 in 5 sports
- Flag bearer: Colin Coates
- Medals: Gold 0 Silver 0 Bronze 0 Total 0

Winter Olympics appearances (overview)
- 1936; 1948; 1952; 1956; 1960; 1964; 1968; 1972; 1976; 1980; 1984; 1988; 1992; 1994; 1998; 2002; 2006; 2010; 2014; 2018; 2022; 2026

Australia competed at the 1984 Winter Olympics in Sarajevo, Yugoslavia. Eleven athletes participated, competing in alpine skiing, biathlon, cross-country skiing, figure skating, and speed skating. Australia's best result was 19th in downhill skiing by Steven Lee.

This was the first Olympics in which Australia competed in biathlon.

== Alpine skiing ==
Men

Athlete	Event	Final					
Athlete	Event	Run 1	Rank	Run 2	Rank	Total	Rank
Steven Lee	Downhill	—N/a				1:48.02	19
Steven Lee	Giant slalom	1:28.76	36	Disqualified			
Alistair Guss	Downhill	—N/a				1:50.57	34

Women

Athlete	Event	Final					
Athlete	Event	Run 1	Rank	Run 2	Rank	Total	Rank
Marilla Guss	Downhill	—N/a				1:19.75	28

== Biathlon ==
Men

Athlete	Event	Final		
Athlete	Event	Time	Misses	Rank
Andrew Paul	Individual	1:26:38.7	5	47
Andrew Paul	Sprint	36:32.4	3	50

== Cross-country skiing ==
Men

Athlete	Event	Race	
Athlete	Event	Time	Rank
Chris Allen	15 km	49:14.5	64
Chris Allen	30 km	1:45:07.7	59
Chris Allen	50 km	2:44:19.1	49
David Hislop	15 km	47:25.5	59
David Hislop	30 km	1:43:46.2	57
David Hislop	50 km	2:39:53.1	48

== Figure skating ==
Athlete(s)	Event	CD1	CF/CD2	SP/OD	FS/FD	Total	
Athlete(s)	Event	FP	FP	FP	FP	TFP	
Cameron Medhurst	Men's	—N/a	11.4	6.4	20.0	37.8	19
Vicki Holland	Ladies'	—N/a	12.0	8.0	21.0	41.0	21

== Speed skating ==
Athlete	Event	Final	
Athlete	Event	Time	Rank
Mike Richmond	500 m	39.47	22
Mike Richmond	1000 m	1:19.53	27
Mike Richmond	1500 m	2:04.62	34
Colin Coates	1500 m	2:08.13	37
Colin Coates	5000 m	7:38.08	25
Colin Coates	10000 m	15:21.73	22

== See also ==
- Australia at the Winter Olympics
