= Stephen Daglish =

British cross-country skier (born 1957)

Personal information
- Nationality: British
- Born: 1 June 1957 (age 67); Jarrow, England

Sport
- Sport: Cross-country skiing

Stephen Daglish (born 1 June 1957) is a British cross-country skier. He competed in the men's 30 kilometre event at the 1984 Winter Olympics.
