= Asko Autio =

Finnish cross-country skier

Personal information
- Nationality: Finland
- Born: 21 April 1953 (age 73) Ylivieska, Finland

Sport
- Sport: Skiing

World Cup career
- Seasons: 3 – (1982–1984)
- Indiv. starts: 6
- Indiv. podiums: 2
- Indiv. wins: 1
- Team starts: 0
- Overall titles: 0 – (12th in 1983)

Asko Autio (born 21 April 1953) is a Finnish cross-country skier. He competed in the 50 km event at the 1980 Winter Olympics.

== Cross-country skiing results ==
All results are sourced from the International Ski Federation (FIS).

=== Olympic Games ===
Year	Age	15 km	30 km	50 km	4 × 10 km relay
1980	27	—	—	9	—

=== World Championships ===
Year	Age	15 km	30 km	50 km	4 × 10 km relay
1982	29	—	—	5	—

=== World Cup ===
==== Season standings ====
Season	Age	Overall
1982	29	27
1983	30	12
1984	31	62

==== Individual podiums ====
- 1 victory
- 2 podiums

No.	Season	Date	Location	Race	Level	Place
1	1982–83	4 March 1983	Lahti, Finland	15 km Individual	World Cup	3rd
2	1982–83	12 March 1983	Oslo, Norway	50 km Individual	World Cup	1st
