= Song Shi (skier) =

Chinese cross-country skier

- 宋石
- Born: 30 November 1958 (age 67)
- Occupation: Cross-country skier

Song Shi (Chinese: 宋石; pinyin: Sòng Shí, born 30 November 1958) is a former Chinese cross-country skier who competed in cross-country skiing at the 1984 Winter Olympics. He finished 66th in the 15 km race, 62nd in the 30 km race, and 15th in the 4 x 10 km relay.
