= Nikolay Zimyatov =

Soviet cross country skier

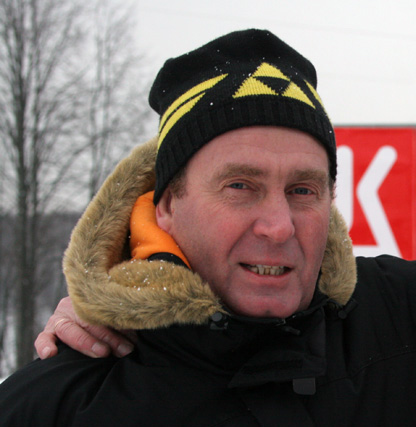
- Nikolay Zimyatov in 2008

Personal information
- Nationality: Russia
- Born: 28 June 1955 (age 71) Moscow, Russian SFSR, Soviet Union

Sport
- Sport: Skiing

World Cup career
- Seasons: 5 – (1982–1985, 1988)
- Indiv. starts: 17
- Indiv. podiums: 2
- Indiv. wins: 2
- Team starts: 2
- Team podiums: 1
- Team wins: 0
- Overall titles: 0 – (6th in 1984)
Medal record
Men's cross-country skiing
Representing Soviet Union
Olympic Games
Gold medal – first place	1980 Lake Placid	30 km
Gold medal – first place	1980 Lake Placid	50 km
Gold medal – first place	1980 Lake Placid	4 × 10 km relay
Gold medal – first place	1984 Sarajevo	30 km
Silver medal – second place	1984 Sarajevo	4 × 10 km relay
World Championships
Silver medal – second place	1978 Lahti	30 km

Nikolay Semyonovich Zimyatov (Russian: Николай Семёнович Зимятов; born 28 June 1955), is a Soviet and Russian cross-country skier. He was the first man in the sport to win three gold medals at a single Winter Olympics, in the 30 km, 50 km and 4 × 10 km relay at the 1980 Lake Placid Games. In the 50 km race he finished two and half minutes ahead of the second place. He also won the 30 km event at the 1984 Winter Olympics in Sarajevo and was awarded Order of Friendship of Peoples that year.

At the world championships Zimyatov won only one medal, a silver over 30 km in 1978. Nationally he collected four Soviet titles: in the 30 km and 4 × 10 km relay in 1978, and in the 15 and 30 km in 1979. After retiring from competitions he had a long career as a cross-country skiing coach and prepared the Russian team for the 2002 Olympics. In 1980 he married a fellow international skier Lyubov Sykova.

== Cross-country skiing results ==
All results are sourced from the International Ski Federation (FIS).

=== Olympic Games ===
- 5 medals – (4 gold, 1 silver)

Year	Age	15 km	30 km	50 km	4 × 10 km relay
1980	24	4	Gold	Gold	Gold
1984	28	6	Gold	13	Silver

=== World Championships ===
- 1 medal – (1 silver)

Year	Age	15 km	30 km	50 km	4 × 10 km relay
1978	22	5	Silver	—	4
1985	29	8	17	—	6

=== World Cup ===
==== Season standings ====
Season	Age	Overall
1982	26	NC
1983	27	9
1984	28	6
1985	29	19
1988	32	41

==== Individual podiums ====
- 2 victories
- 2 podiums

No.	Season	Date	Location	Race	Level	Place
1	1983–84	10 December 1983	Reit im Winkl, West Germany	15 km Individual	World Cup	1st
2	1983–84	10 February 1984	(Socialist Federal Republic of Yugoslavia) Sarajevo, Yugoslavia	30 km Individual	Olympic Games^{[1]}	1st

==== Team podiums ====
- 1 podium

No.	Season	Date	Location	Race	Level	Place	Teammates
1	1983–84	16 February 1984	(Socialist Federal Republic of Yugoslavia) Sarajevo, Yugoslavia	4 × 10 km Relay	Olympic Games^{[1]}	2nd	Batyuk / Zavyalov / Nikitin

Note: ^{1} Until the 1994 Olympics, Olympic races were included in the World Cup scoring system.
