= Anna Pasiarová =

Slovak cross-country skier (born 1949)

Personal information
- Nationality: Slovakia
- Born: 18 December 1949 (age 76) Tatranské Matliare (now part of Vysoké Tatry), Czechoslovakia

Sport
- Sport: Skiing

World Cup career
- Seasons: 3 – (1982–1984)
- Indiv. starts: 20
- Indiv. podiums: 4
- Indiv. wins: 0
- Team starts: 1
- Team podiums: 0
- Overall titles: 0 – (6th in 1982)

Anna Pasiarová (born 18 December 1949) is a Slovak cross-country skier. She competed at the 1976 Winter Olympics and the 1984 Winter Olympics.

== Cross-country skiing results ==
All results are sourced from the International Ski Federation (FIS).

=== Olympic Games ===
Year	Age	5 km	10 km	20 km	4 × 5 km relay
1976	26	15	13	—N/a	6
1984	34	—	27	16	—

=== World Championships ===
Year	Age	5 km	10 km	20 km	4 × 5 km relay
1978	28	18	14	—	6
1982	32	6	8	—	5

=== World Cup ===
==== Season standings ====
Season	Age	Overall
1982	32	6
1983	33	9
1984	34	13

==== Individual podiums ====
- 4 podiums

No.	Season	Date	Location	Race	Level	Place
1	1981–82	9 January 1982	Klingenthal, East Germany	10 km Individual	World Cup	3rd
2	1982–83	12 March 1983	Oslo, Norway	20 km Individual	World Cup	3rd
3	1983–84	9 December 1983	Reit im Winkl, West Germany	5 km Individual	World Cup	2nd
4	1983–84	17 December 1983	Autrans, France	10 km Individual	World Cup	2nd
