= Ski Federation of Ukraine =

Sports governing body in Ukraine

- Formation: 1952
- Type: Skiing
- Headquarters: 5 Dilova Street, Kyiv, Ukraine
- Region served: Ukraine
- Members: International Ski and Snowboard Federation (1992)
- Official language: Russian
- President: Ihor Mitiukov
- Affiliations: (Europe)
- Website: www.sfu.org.ua/eng

Ski Federation of Ukraine (Ukrainian: Федерація лижного спорту України, ФЛСУ, Federatsiya lyzhnoho sportu Ukrayiny (FLSU); literally Federation of Ski Sports of Ukraine) is a national governing body of skiing in Ukraine.

The federation includes such skiing disciplines as alpine skiing, snowboarding, cross-country skiing (roller skiing), freestyle skiing, Nordic skiing, and ski jumping.

The federation was created in 1952 on initiative of Sergei Fomin who after the World War II stayed in Kiev.

Among notable members of the federation is Oleksandr Batyuk who won a silver Olympic medal (as part of the Soviet cross-country relay team at the 1984 Winter Olympics and the only representative of the Ukrainian SSR) and Iryna Taranenko-Terelia who won number of ski championships of the Soviet Union and Ukraine.

== See also ==
- International Ski and Snowboard Federation (FIS)
