= Andrew Rawlin =

British cross-country skier (born 1960)

Personal information
- Nationality: British
- Born: 14 July 1960 (age 64); Sheffield, England

Sport
- Sport: Cross-country skiing

Andrew Rawlin (born 14 July 1960) is a British cross-country skier. He competed in the men's 30 kilometre event at the 1984 Winter Olympics.
