= Alexander Zavyalov =

Soviet cross country skier

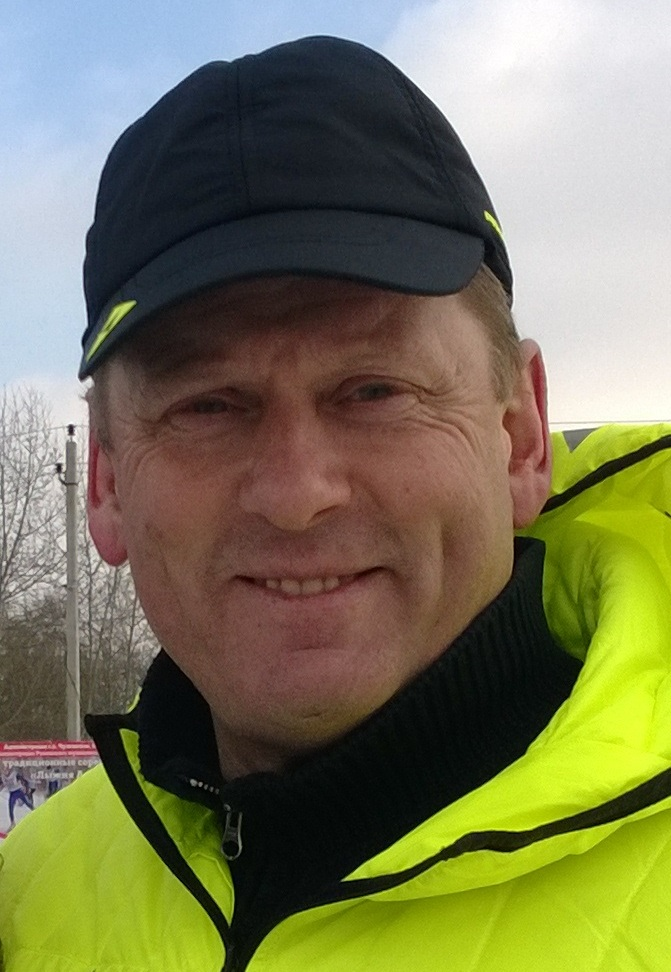
- Alexander Zavyalov at the Ski Track in 2015

Personal information
- Nationality: Russia
- Born: 2 June 1955 (age 71) Moscow, Russian SFSR, Soviet Union

Sport
- Sport: Skiing

World Cup career
- Seasons: 3 – (1982–1984)
- Indiv. starts: 15
- Indiv. podiums: 6
- Indiv. wins: 3
- Team starts: 2
- Team podiums: 2
- Team wins: 1
- Overall titles: 1 – (1983)
Medal record
Men's cross-country skiing
Representing Soviet Union
Olympic Games
Silver medal – second place	1984 Sarajevo	30 km
Silver medal – second place	1984 Sarajevo	4 × 10 km relay
Bronze medal – third place	1980 Lake Placid	50 km
World Championships
Gold medal – first place	1982 Oslo	4 × 10 km relay
Silver medal – second place	1982 Oslo	15 km

Alexander Alexandrovich Zavyalov (Russian: Алекса́ндр Алекса́ндрович Завья́лов; born 2 June 1955) is a former Soviet/Russian cross-country skier who competed in the early 1980s, training at Armed Forces sports society. He won a bronze in the 50 km at the 1980 Winter Olympics in Lake Placid, New York, and two silvers at the 1984 Winter Olympics in Sarajevo (30 km, 4 × 10 km relay). Zavyalov won the Cross-Country World Cup in the 1982–83 season.

Zavyalov also won two medals at the 1982 FIS Nordic World Ski Championships with a gold in the 4 × 10 km relay (tied with Oddvar Brå) and a silver in the 15 km.

Zavyalov graduated from Smolensk Institute of Physical Culture (1978). He was awarded Order of Lenin in 1983.

== Cross-country skiing results ==
All results are sourced from the International Ski Federation (FIS).

=== Olympic Games ===
- 3 medals – (2 silver, 1 bronze)

Year	Age	15 km	30 km	50 km	4 × 10 km relay
1980	24	7	—	Bronze	—
1984	28	16	Silver	7	Silver

=== World Championships ===
- 2 medals – (1 gold, 1 silver)

Year	Age	15 km	30 km	50 km	4 × 10 km relay
1982	26	Silver	6	6	Gold

=== World Cup ===
==== Season titles ====
- 1 title – (1 overall)

Season
Season	Discipline
1983	Overall

==== Season standings ====
Season	Age	
Season	Age	Overall
1982	26	15
1983	27	1st place, gold medalist(s)
1984	28	15

==== Individual podiums ====
- 3 victories
- 6 podiums

No.	Season	Date	Location	Race	Level	Place
1	1981–82	23 February 1982	Oslo, Norway	15 km Individual	World Championships^{[1]}	2nd
2	1982–83	10 February 1983	(Socialist Federal Republic of Yugoslavia) Igman, Yugoslavia	15 km Individual	World Cup	1st
3	1982–83	26 February 1983	Falun, Sweden	30 km Individual	World Cup	1st
4	1982–83	4 March 1983	Lahti, Finland	15 km Individual	World Cup	1st
5	1982–83	27 March 1983	Labrador City, Canada	30 km Individual	World Cup	2nd
6	1983–84	10 February 1984	(Socialist Federal Republic of Yugoslavia) Sarajevo, Yugoslavia	30 km Individual	Olympic Games^{[1]}	2nd

==== Team podiums ====
- 1 victory
- 2 podiums

No.	Season	Date	Location	Race	Level	Place	Teammates
1	1981–82	25 February 1982	Oslo, Norway	4 × 10 km Relay	World Championships^{[1]}	1st	Nikitin / Batyuk / Burlakov
2	1983–84	16 February 1984	(Socialist Federal Republic of Yugoslavia) Sarajevo, Yugoslavia	4 × 10 km Relay	Olympic Games^{[1]}	2nd	Batyuk / Nikitin / Zimyatov

Note: ^{1} Until the 1999 World Championships and the 1994 Winter Olympics, World Championship and Olympic races were included in the World Cup scoring system.
