= Jan Lindvall =

Norwegian cross-country skier

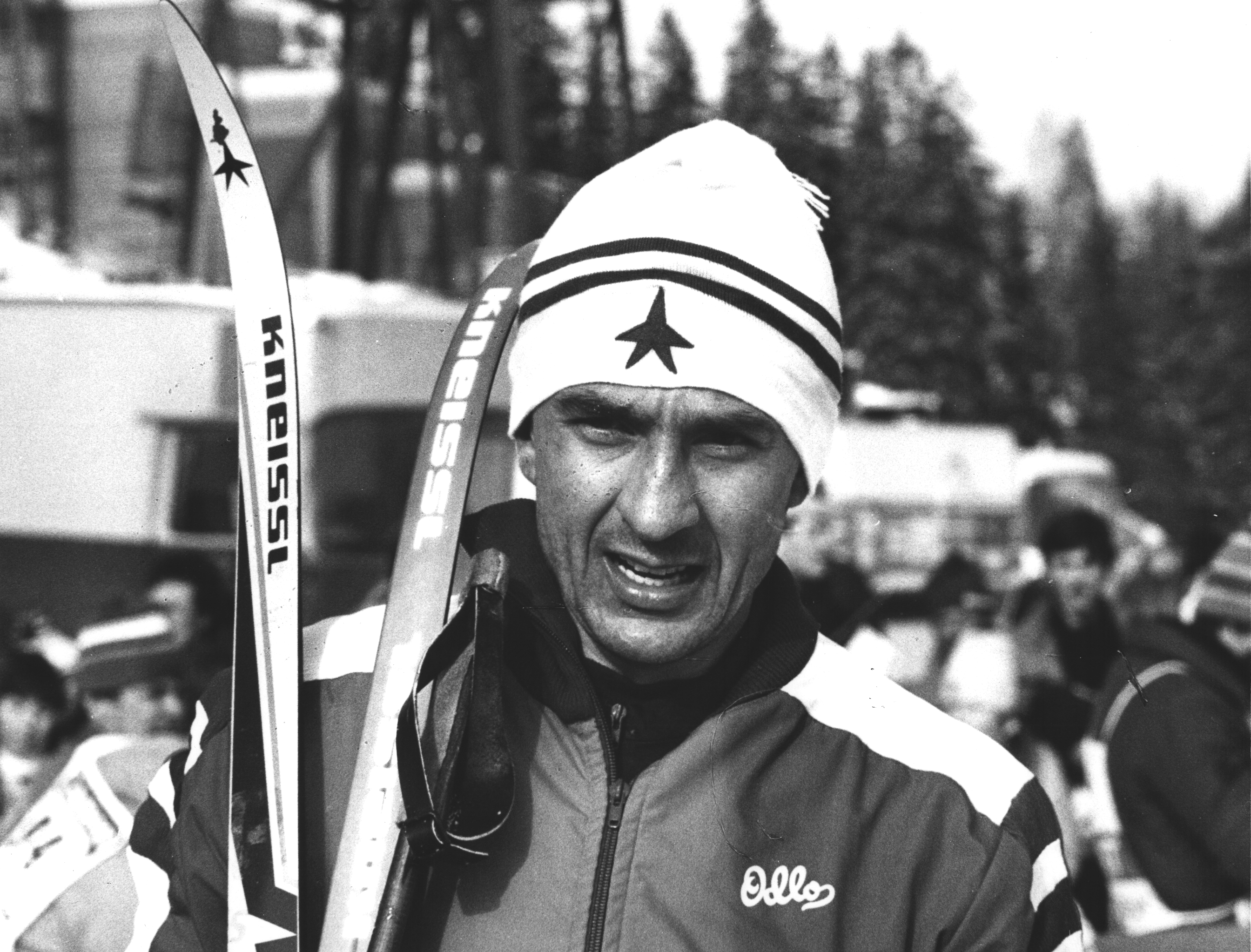
- Jan Lindvall in March, 1981

Personal information
- Nationality: Norway
- Born: 18 March 1950 (age 76) Kåfjord, Norway

Sport
- Sport: Skiing
- Club: Tromsø SK

World Cup career
- Seasons: 3 – (1982–1984)
- Indiv. starts: 16
- Indiv. podiums: 4
- Indiv. wins: 1
- Team starts: 1
- Team podiums: 0
- Overall titles: 0 – (4th in 1983)

Jan Petter Lindvall (born March 18, 1950, in Kåfjord Municipality) is a Norwegian retired cross-country skier who competed from 1982 to 1984. He finished fifth in the 50 km event at the 1984 Winter Olympics in Sarajevo.

Lindvall finished 11th in the 50 km event at the 1982 FIS Nordic World Ski Championships in Oslo. His only World Cup victory was in a 50 km event in the Soviet Union in 1983.

== Cross-country skiing results ==
All results are sourced from the International Ski Federation (FIS).

=== Olympic Games ===
Year	Age	15 km	30 km	50 km	4 × 10 km relay
1984	33	—	13	5	4

=== World Championships ===
Year	Age	15 km	30 km	50 km	4 × 10 km relay
1982	31	—	—	11	—

=== World Cup ===
==== Season standings ====
Season	Age	Overall
1982	31	21
1983	32	4
1984	33	10

==== Individual podiums ====
- 1 victory
- 4 podiums

No.	Season	Date	Location	Race	Level	Place
1	1981–82	7 March 1982	Lahti, Finland	50 km Individual	World Cup	2nd
2	1982–83	9 February 1983	Kavgolovo, Soviet Union	50 km Individual	World Cup	1st
3	1982–83	26 February 1983	Falun, Sweden	30 km Individual	World Cup	3rd
4	1983–84	25 February 1984	Falun, Sweden	30 km Individual	World Cup	3rd
