= Alejandro Baratta =

Argentine cross-country skier (born 1959)

Personal information
- Born: 13 April 1959 (age 65); Bariloche, Argentina

Sport
- Sport: Cross-country skiing

Alejandro Baratta (born 13 April 1959) is an Argentine cross-country skier. He competed in the men's 30 kilometre event at the 1984 Winter Olympics.
