= Lars Erik Eriksen =

Norwegian cross-country skier

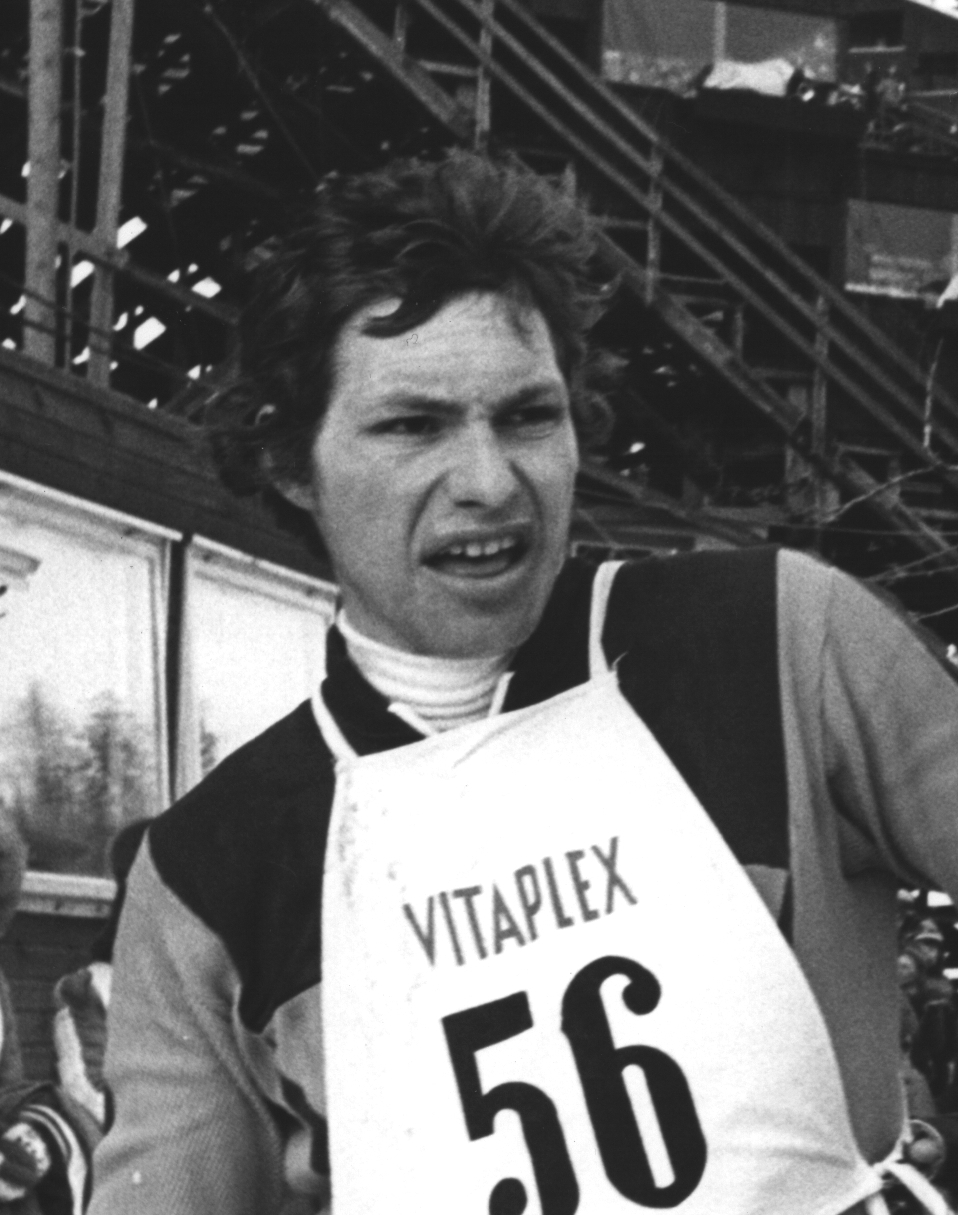
- Eriksen in March 1976

Personal information
- Nationality: Norway
- Born: 29 December 1954 (age 71) Oslo, Norway

Sport
- Sport: Skiing
- Club: Bjerke IL

World Cup career
- Seasons: 4 – (1982–1985)
- Indiv. starts: 14
- Indiv. podiums: 4
- Indiv. wins: 1
- Team starts: 2
- Team podiums: 1
- Team wins: 1
- Overall titles: 0 – (8th in 1984)
Medal record
Men's cross-country skiing
Representing Norway
Olympic Games
Silver medal – second place	1980 Lake Placid	4 × 10 km relay
World Championships
Gold medal – first place	1982 Oslo	4 × 10 km relay
Silver medal – second place	1982 Oslo	30 km
Bronze medal – third place	1978 Lahti	4 × 10 km relay
Bronze medal – third place	1982 Oslo	50 km

Lars Erik Eriksen (born 29 December 1954) is a retired Norwegian cross-country skier who competed in multiple events at the 1980 and 1984 Olympics and 1978 and 1982 World Championships. He had his best achievements in the 4 × 10 km relay, winning a bronze in 1978, a silver in 1980 and a gold in 1982, and finishing in fourth place at the 1984 Olympic Games. Individually, he performed better in longer distances, winning two medals in the 30 and 50 km at the 1982 World Championships and finishing fourth in the 50 km at the 1980 Olympic Games, though he also won the 1984 World Cup in the 15 km event. Eriksen retired in 1988, and later worked as a skiing coach, with Bjørn Dæhlie among others.

Eriksen was awarded the Holmenkollen medal in 1984 (shared with Jacob Vaage and Armin Kogler).

== Cross-country skiing results ==
All results are sourced from the International Ski Federation (FIS).

=== Olympic Games ===
- 1 medal – (1 silver)

Year	Age	15 km	30 km	50 km	4 × 10 km relay
1980	25	10	10	4	Silver
1984	29	—	6	11	4

=== World Championships ===
- 4 medals – (1 gold, 1 silver, 2 bronze)

Year	Age	15 km	30 km	50 km	4 × 10 km relay
1978	23	11	8	5	Bronze
1982	27	—	Silver	Bronze	Gold

=== World Cup ===
==== Season standings ====
Season	Age	Overall
1982	27	11
1983	28	29
1984	29	8
1985	30	51

==== Individual podiums ====
- 1 victory
- 4 podiums

No.	Season	Date	Location	Race	Level	Place
1	1981–82	20 February 1982	Oslo, Norway	30 km Individual	World Championships^{[1]}	2nd
2	1981–82	25 February 1982	Oslo, Norway	50 km Individual	World Championships^{[1]}	3rd
3	1982–83	12 February 1983	(Socialist Federal Republic of Yugoslavia) Igman, Yugoslavia	30 km Individual	World Cup	2nd
4	1983–84	2 March 1984	Lahti, Finland	15 km Individual	World Cup	1st

==== Team podiums ====
- 1 victory
- 1 podium

No.	Season	Date	Location	Race	Level	Place	Teammates
1	1981–82	25 February 1982	Oslo, Norway	4 × 10 km Relay	World Championships^{[1]}	1st	Aunli / Mikkelsplass / Brå

Note: ^{1} Until the 1999 World Championships, World Championship races were included in the World Cup scoring system.
