= Ivo Čarman =

Slovenian cross-country skier

Personal information
- Nationality: Slovenian
- Born: 24 September 1959 (age 65); Kranj, Yugoslavia

Sport
- Sport: Cross-country skiing

Ivo Čarman (born 24 September 1959) is a Slovenian cross-country skier. He competed at the 1980 Winter Olympics and the 1984 Winter Olympics.
