= Peter Juric =

Austrian cross-country skier

Personal information
- Nationality: Austrian
- Born: 4 May 1958 (age 66); Salzburg, Austria

Sport
- Sport: Cross-country skiing

Peter Juric (born 4 May 1958) is an Austrian cross-country skier. He competed in the men's 30 kilometre event at the 1984 Winter Olympics.
