= Pürevjavyn Batsükh =

Mongolian cross-country skier (born 1955)

Personal information
- Nationality: Mongolian
- Born: 7 November 1955 (age 69)

Sport
- Sport: Cross-country skiing

Pürevjavyn Batsükh (born 7 November 1955) is a Mongolian cross-country skier. He competed in the men's 15 kilometre event at the 1984 Winter Olympics.
