= Jean-Denis Jaussaud =

French cross-country skier (born 1962)

Personal information
- Nationality: French
- Born: 18 February 1962 (age 63)

Sport
- Sport: Cross-country skiing

Jean-Denis Jaussaud (born 18 February 1962) is a French cross-country skier. He competed in the men's 15 kilometre event at the 1984 Winter Olympics.
