= Bill Koch (skier) =

American skier (born 1955)

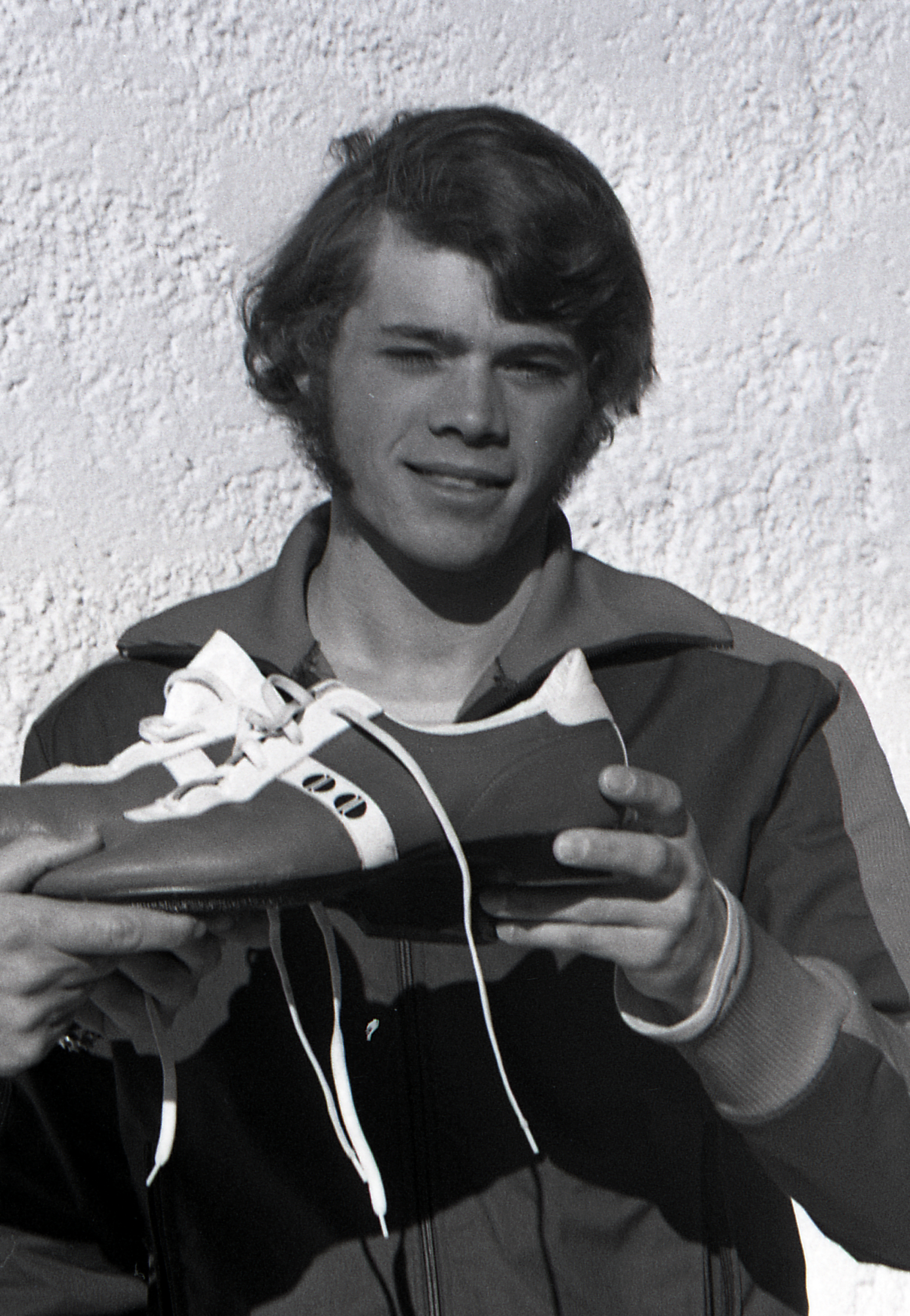
- Bill Koch at the 1976 Winter Olympics in Innsbruck, Austria

Personal information
- Full name: William Conrad Koch
- Nationality: United States
- Born: June 7, 1955 (age 71) Brattleboro, Vermont, U.S.

Sport
- Sport: Skiing

World Cup career
- Seasons: 4 – (1982–1984, 1992)
- Indiv. starts: 18
- Indiv. podiums: 8
- Indiv. wins: 5
- Team starts: 1
- Team podiums: 0
- Overall titles: 1 – (1982)
Medal record
Men's cross-country skiing
Representing United States
Olympic Games
Silver medal – second place	1976 Innsbruck	30 km
World Championships
Bronze medal – third place	1982 Oslo	30 km

William Conrad Koch (/koʊk/ KOHK; born June 7, 1955) is an American cross-country skier who competed at the international level. A native of Guilford, Vermont, he is a graduate of the nearby Putney School in Putney. In 1974, he became the first American to win a medal in international competition, placing third in the European junior championships.

== Biography ==
Koch was born in Brattleboro, Vermont, to Fred and Nancy Koch. His parents divorced, and, in 1965, when his mother became remarried to the then president of Marlboro College, Koch lived with the new family. At the age of 12, Koch met noted cross-country skier Bob Gray, who taught him how to train effectively. When the family moved to England, Koch attended Aiglon College, a boarding school in Switzerland, for a year. The next year, the family returned to Vermont, and it became expeditious for Koch to attend the Putney School, where he could pursue his interest in cross-country skiing.

Koch married and became the father of two daughters. Over time he took his family to New Zealand and Australia, in search of "new frontiers". After his athletic career, he consulted in the construction of cross-country ski courses in Frisco, Colorado; Cable, Wisconsin; and Labrador City, Newfoundland. He later lived in Hawaii, where he found a way to skate-ski on wet sand. By 2006, he had returned to Putney briefly.

== Athletic career ==
Koch won the silver medal in the 30 km event at the 1976 Winter Olympics, becoming the first American to win an Olympic medal in cross-country skiing, and the only one until 2018. Koch also finished sixth in the 15 km event at those same Winter Games. In 1981 Koch set the world record time of just under two hours for 50k on a pond in Marlboro, Vermont.

Stress caused by media pressure, along with asthma, plagued Koch after his early successes. Considered the top American sportsman at the 1980 Winter Olympics, he performed poorly and finished far out of contention in all of his races.

Koch was a self-assured athlete when it came to his training regime, which sometimes put him at odds with his coach, Marty Hall.

Afterward, he popularized a new cross-country skiing technique that resembled ice skating on skis, now known as the skate skiing technique. Races that allow skate skiing are called freestyle races because they allow skiers to use either skate skiing or classic technique.

In 1982 he was crowned the cross-country skiing overall World Cup champion. Koch earned a bronze medal in the 30 km event at the 1982 FIS Nordic World Ski Championships, becoming the first non-European ever to medal in cross-country skiing at the World Championships. (Canada's Sara Renner would become the second when she earned a bronze medal in the individual sprint at the 2005 FIS Nordic World Ski Championships in Oberstdorf.) Koch also finished third overall in the 1983 World Cup. The freestyle skiing technique has been used in Biathlon competitions since 1985, has been mandatory in Nordic combined since 1985, and has been part of all cross-country skiing competitions since 1982.

Koch carried the American flag at the opening ceremonies of the 1992 Winter Olympics in Albertville.

The Bill Koch Ski League, the youth ski league of NENSA (the New England Nordic Ski Association), is named after Koch.

In 2012, Koch was honored as part of the inaugural class of the Vermont Sports Hall of Fame.

== Cross-country skiing results ==
All results are sourced from the International Ski Federation (FIS).

=== Olympic Games ===
- 1 medal – (1 silver)

Year	Age	10 km	15 km	Pursuit	30 km	50 km	4 × 10 km relay
1976	20	—N/a	6	—N/a	Silver	13	6
1980	24	—N/a	16	—N/a	DNF	13	8
1984	28	—N/a	27	—N/a	21	17	8
1992	36	—	—N/a	—	42	—	—

=== World Championships ===
- 1 medal – (1 bronze)

Year	Age	15 km	30 km	50 km	4 × 10 km relay
1978	22	15	33	—	9
1982	26	21	Bronze	—	—

=== World Cup ===
==== Season titles ====
- 1 title – (1 overall)

Season
Season	Discipline
1982	Overall

==== Season standings ====
Season	Age	Overall
1982	26	1st place, gold medalist(s)
1983	27	3rd place, bronze medalist(s)
1984	28	54
1992	36	NC

==== Individual podiums ====
- 5 victories
- 8 podiums

No.	Season	Date	Location	Race	Level	Place
1	1981–82	16 January 1982	Le Brassus, Switzerland	15 km Individual	World Cup	1st
2	1981–82	21 January 1982	Brusson, Italy	30 km Individual	World Cup	1st
3	1981–82	20 February 1982	Oslo, Norway	30 km Individual	World Championships^{[1]}	3rd
4	1981–82	12 March 1982	Falun, Sweden	30 km Individual	World Cup	1st
5	1981–82	27 March 1982	Kastelruth, Italy	15 km Individual	World Cup	1st
6	1982–83	14 January 1983	Reit im Winkl, West Germany	15 km Individual	World Cup	2nd
7	1982–83	12 February 1983	(Socialist Federal Republic of Yugoslavia) Sarajevo, Yugoslavia	30 km Individual	World Cup	1st
8	1982–83	19 March 1983	Anchorage, United States	15 km Individual	World Cup	3rd

Note: ^{1} Until the 1999 World Championships, World Championship races were included in the World Cup scoring system.

Olympic Games
Preceded by Evelyn Ashford	Flagbearer for United States; Albertville 1992	Succeeded by Francie Larrieu Smith
