= Jože Klemenčič =

Slovenian cross-country skier

Personal information
- Nationality: Slovenian
- Born: 3 June 1962 (age 62); Ljubljana, Yugoslavia

Sport
- Sport: Cross-country skiing

Jože Klemenčič (born 3 June 1962) is a Slovenian cross-country skier. He competed in the men's 15 kilometre event at the 1984 Winter Olympics.
