= Miloš Bečvář =

Czech cross-country skier

Personal information
- Nationality: Czech
- Born: 21 January 1957 (age 68); Strakonice, Czechoslovakia

Sport
- Sport: Cross-country skiing

Miloš Bečvář (born 21 January 1957) is a Czech cross-country skier. He competed at the 1980 Winter Olympics and the 1984 Winter Olympics.
