= Janež Kršinar =

Slovenian cross-country skier

Personal information
- Nationality: Slovenian
- Born: 7 April 1962 (age 62); Ljubljana, Yugoslavia

Sport
- Sport: Cross-country skiing

Janež Kršinar (born 7 April 1962) is a Slovenian cross-country skier. He competed at the 1984 Winter Olympics and the 1988 Winter Olympics.
