= Dušan Đurišič =

Slovenian cross-country skier

Personal information
- Nationality: Slovenian
- Born: 13 March 1961 (age 65) Jesenice, Yugoslavia

Sport
- Sport: Cross-country skiing

Dušan Đurišič (born 13 March 1961) is a Slovenian cross-country skier. He competed in the men's 15 kilometre event at the 1984 Winter Olympics.
