= Chris Allen (skier) =

Australian cross-country skier (born 1959)

Personal information
- Nationality: Australian
- Born: 8 February 1959 (age 66) Frankston, Victoria, Australia

Sport
- Sport: Cross-country skiing

Christopher Allen (born 8 February 1959) is an Australian cross-country skier. He competed in the men's 15 kilometre event at the 1984 Winter Olympics.
