= Mark Moore (skier) =

British cross-country skier (born 1961)

Personal information
- Nationality: British
- Born: 28 September 1961 (age 63); Rinteln, Germany

Sport
- Sport: Cross-country skiing

Mark Moore (born 28 September 1961) is a British cross-country skier. He competed in the men's 15 kilometre event at the 1984 Winter Olympics. As the son of John Moore and grandson of George Moore, he is a third generation Olympian.
