= Milush Ivanchev =

Bulgarian cross-country skier (born 1954)

Personal information
- Nationality: Bulgarian
- Born: 9 August 1954 (age 70); Dorkovo, Bulgaria

Sport
- Sport: Cross-country skiing

Milush Ivanchev (Bulgarian: Милуш Иванчев; born 9 August 1954) is a Bulgarian cross-country skier. He competed at the 1984 Winter Olympics and the 1988 Winter Olympics.
