= David Hislop =

Australian cross-country skier (born 1959)

Personal information
- Nationality: Australian
- Born: 3 February 1959 (age 66); Sydney, Australia

Sport
- Sport: Cross-country skiing

David Hislop (born 3 February 1959) is an Australian cross-country skier. He competed at the 1984 Winter Olympics and the 1988 Winter Olympics.
