= Ricardo Holler =

Argentine cross-country skier (born 1962)

Personal information
- Born: 19 August 1962 (age 62); Buenos Aires, Argentina

Sport
- Sport: Cross-country skiing

Ricardo Holler (born 19 August 1962) is an Argentine cross-country skier. He competed in the men's 15 kilometre event at the 1984 Winter Olympics.
