= 1982–83 FIS Cross-Country World Cup =

Cross-country skiing competition

Discipline	Men	Women
Overall	(Soviet Union) Alexander Zavyalov	(Finland) Marja-Liisa Hämäläinen
Nations Cup	Norway	Norway
- Nations Cup Overall: Norway

Competition
Locations	9 venues	10 venues
Individual	10 events	10 events

The 1982–83 FIS Cross-Country World Cup was the 2nd official World Cup season in cross-country skiing for men and women. The World Cup started in Val di Sole, Italy on 12 December 1982 and finished in Labrador City, Canada on 27 March 1983. Alexander Zavyalov of the Soviet Union won the overall men's cup, and Marja-Liisa Hämäläinen of Finland won the women's.

== Calendar ==
=== Men ===
No.	Date	Venue	Event	Winner	Second	Third	Ref.
1	18 December 1982	(Switzerland) Davos	15 km	(Norway) Pål Gunnar Mikkelsplass	(Norway) Tor Håkon Holte	(Soviet Union) Yuriy Burlakov	
2	14 January 1983	(West Germany) Reit im Winkl	15 km	(Sweden) Jan Ottosson	(United States) Bill Koch	(West Germany) Stefan Dotzler	
3	10 February 1983	(Socialist Federal Republic of Yugoslavia) Sarajevo	15 km	(Soviet Union) Alexander Zavyalov	(Finland) Juha Mieto	(Soviet Union) Mikhail Devyatyarov	
4	12 February 1983	(Socialist Federal Republic of Yugoslavia) Sarajevo	30 km	(United States) Bill Koch	(Norway) Lars Erik Eriksen	(Soviet Union) Yuriy Borodavko	
5	20 February 1983	(Soviet Union) Kavgolovo	50 km	(Norway) Jan Lindvall	(Norway) Per Knut Aaland	(Soviet Union) Yuriy Burlakov	
6	26 February 1983	(Sweden) Falun	30 km	(Soviet Union) Alexander Zavyalov	(Sweden) Thomas Wassberg	(Norway) Jan Lindvall	
7	4 March 1983	(Finland) Lahti	15 km	(Soviet Union) Alexander Zavyalov	(Norway) Pål Gunnar Mikkelsplass	(Finland) Asko Autio	
8	12 March 1983	(Norway) Oslo	50 km	(Finland) Asko Autio	(Norway) Per Knut Aaland	(Sweden) Gunde Svan	
9	19 March 1983	(United States) Anchorage	15 km	(Sweden) Gunde Svan	(United States) Tim Caldwell	(United States) Bill Koch	
10	27 March 1983	(Canada) Labrador City	30 km	(Sweden) Gunde Svan	(Soviet Union) Alexander Zavyalov	(Sweden) Thomas Wassberg	

=== Women ===
No.	Date	Venue	Event	Winner	Second	Third	Ref.
1	12 December 1982	(Italy) Val di Sole	5 km	(Czechoslovakia) Květa Jeriová	(Finland) Marja-Liisa Hämäläinen	(Czechoslovakia) Blanka Paulů	
2	8 January 1983	(East Germany) Klingenthal	10 km	(Norway) Brit Pettersen	(Sweden) Marie Risby	(Czechoslovakia) Blanka Paulů	
3	14 January 1983	(Czechoslovakia) Stachy Zadow	10 km	(Norway) Brit Pettersen	(Norway) Anne Jahren	(Czechoslovakia) Blanka Paulů	
4	10 February 1983	(Socialist Federal Republic of Yugoslavia) Sarajevo	5 km	(Czechoslovakia) Blanka Paulů	(Norway) Anne Jahren	(Soviet Union) Nadesha Shamakova	
5	19 February 1983	(Soviet Union) Kavgolovo	20 km	(Czechoslovakia) Květa Jeriová	(Norway) Brit Pettersen	(Norway) Anne Jahren	
6	25 February 1983	(Sweden) Falun	10 km	(Czechoslovakia) Květa Jeriová	(Finland) Marja-Liisa Hämäläinen	(Norway) Brit Pettersen	
7	5 March 1983	(Finland) Lahti	5 km	(Finland) Marja-Liisa Hämäläinen	(Soviet Union) Raisa Smetanina	(Norway) Brit Pettersen	
8	12 March 1983	(Norway) Oslo	20 km	(Norway) Brit Pettersen	(Finland) Marja-Liisa Hämäläinen	(Czechoslovakia) Anna Pasiarová	
9	20 March 1983	(United States) Anchorage	10 km	(Finland) Marja-Liisa Hämäläinen	(Norway) Brit Pettersen	(Norway) Anne Jahren	
10	27 March 1983	(Canada) Labrador City	10 km	(Finland) Marja-Liisa Hämäläinen	(Czechoslovakia) Blanka Paulů	(Norway) Brit Pettersen	

== Overall standings ==
=== Men's standings ===
Rank		Points
1	(Soviet Union) Alexander Zavyalov	122
2	(Sweden) Gunde Svan	116
3	(United States) Bill Koch	114
4	(Norway) Jan Lindvall	96
5	(Sweden) Thomas Wassberg	94
6	(Norway) Pål Gunnar Mikkelsplass	85
7	(Soviet Union) Yuriy Burlakov	82
8	(Soviet Union) Vladimir Nikitin	79
9	(Soviet Union) Nikolay Zimyatov	74
10	(Switzerland) Andi Grünenfelder	71

=== Women's standings ===
Rank		Points
1	(Finland) Marja-Liisa Hämäläinen	144
2	(Norway) Brit Pettersen	136
3	(Czechoslovakia) Květa Jeriová	126
4	(Czechoslovakia) Blanka Paulů	121
5	(Norway) Anne Jahren	114
6	(Soviet Union) Lyubov Lyadova	87
7	(Norway) Inger Helene Nybråten	80
8	(Soviet Union) Raisa Smetanina	79
9	(Czech Republic) Anna Pasiarová	73
10	(Sweden) Marie Risby	62

== Achievements ==
First World Cup career victory

Men

- (Sweden) Jan Ottosson, 22, in his 2nd season - the WC 2 (15 km) in Reit im Winkl; also first podium
- (Norway) Jan Lindvall, 22, in his 2nd season - the WC 5 (50 km) in Kavgolovo; first podium was 1981–82 WC 7 (50 km) in Lahti
- (Soviet Union) Alexander Zavyalov, 27, in his 2nd season - the WC 3 (15 km) in Sarajevo; first podium was 1981–82 WC 5 (15 km) in Oslo
- (Finland) Asko Autio, 29, in his 2nd season - the WC 8 (50 km) in Oslo; also first podium
- (Sweden) Gunde Svan, 21, in his 1st season - the WC 9 (15 km) in Anchorage; first podium was 1982–83 WC 8 (50 km) in Oslo

Women

- (Finland) Marja-Liisa Hämäläinen, 27, in her 2nd season – the WC 7 (5 km) in Lahti; first podium was 1982-83 WC 1 (15 km) in Val di Sole

Victories in this World Cup (all-time number of victories as of 1982/83 season in parentheses)

Men

- Alexander Zavyalov (URS), 3 (3) first places
- Gunde Svan (SWE), 2 (2) first places
- Bill Koch (USA), 1 (5) first place
- Pål Gunnar Mikkelsplass (NOR), 1 (2) first place
- Jan Lindvall (NOR), 1 (1) first place
- Jan Ottosson (SWE), 1 (1) first place
- Asko Autio (FIN), 1 (1) first place

Women

- Květa Jeriová (TCH), 3 (6) first places
- Brit Pettersen (NOR), 3 (5) first places
- Marja-Liisa Hämäläinen (FIN), 3 (3) first places
- Blanka Paulů (TCH), 1 (2) first place
