= 1981–82 FIS Cross-Country World Cup =

Cross-country skiing competition

Discipline	Men	Women
Overall	(United States) Bill Koch	(Norway) Berit Aunli
Nations Cup	Norway	Norway
- Nations Cup Overall: Norway

Competition
Locations	8 venues	8 venues
Individual	10 events	10 events
Relay/Team	1 event	1 event

The 1981–82 FIS Cross-Country World Cup was the first official World Cup in cross-country skiing. It was arranged by the International Ski Federation (FIS). The 1981/82 World Cup started in Reit im Winkl, West Germany on 9 January 1982 and finished in Kiruna, Sweden on 13 April 1982. Bill Koch of United States won the overall men's event, and Berit Aunli of Norway won the women's.

== Calendar ==
- NOTE: Races marked with (*) counts officially for both as "FIS World Cup" / "FIS Nordic World Ski Championships" wins statistics.

=== Men ===
No.	Date	Venue	Event	Winner	Second	Third	Ref.
1	9 January 1982	(West Germany) Reit im Winkl	15 km	(Norway) Pål Gunnar Mikkelsplass	(Norway) Tor Håkon Holte	(Sweden) Thomas Wassberg	
2	16 January 1982	(Switzerland) Le Brassus	15 km	(United States) Bill Koch	(Sweden) Thomas Wassberg	(Sweden) Benny Kohlberg	
3	24 January 1982	(Italy) Brusson	30 km	(United States) Bill Koch	(France) Jean-Paul Pierrat	(Soviet Union) Sergey Sokarev	
FIS Nordic World Ski Championships 1982
4	20 February 1982	(Norway) Oslo	30 km *	(Sweden) Thomas Eriksson	(Norway) Lars Erik Eriksen	(United States) Bill Koch	
5	23 February 1982	(Norway) Oslo	15 km *	(Norway) Oddvar Brå	(Soviet Union) Alexander Zavyalov	(Finland) Harri Kirvesniemi	
6	27 February 1982	(Norway) Oslo	50 km *	(Sweden) Thomas Wassberg	(Soviet Union) Yuriy Burlakov	(Norway) Lars Erik Eriksen	
7	7 March 1982	(Finland) Lahti	50 km	(Norway) Oddvar Brå	(Norway) Jan Lindvall	(Italy) Maurilio De Zolt	
8	12 March 1982	(Sweden) Falun	30 km	(United States) Bill Koch	(United States) Dan Simoneau	(Sweden) Thomas Wassberg	
9	19 March 1982	(Czechoslovakia) Štrbské Pleso	15 km	(Finland) Harri Kirvesniemi	(Sweden) Thomas Wassberg	(West Germany) Jochen Behle	
10	27 March 1982	(Italy) Kastelruth	15 km	(United States) Bill Koch	(Czechoslovakia) Miloš Bečvář	(Finland) Harri Kirvesniemi	

=== Women ===
No.	Date	Venue	Event	Winner	Second	Third	Ref.
1	9 January 1982	(East Germany) Klingenthal	10 km	(Czechoslovakia) Květa Jeriová	(Norway) Brit Pettersen	(Czechoslovakia) Anna Pasiarová	
2	15 January 1982	(France) La Bresse	5 km	(Czechoslovakia) Květa Jeriová	(Norway) Berit Aunli	(Norway) Marit Myrmæl	
3	22 January 1982	(West Germany) Furtwangen	5 km	(Czechoslovakia) Květa Jeriová	(Czechoslovakia) Gabriela Svobodová	(Czechoslovakia) Blanka Paulů	
FIS Nordic World Ski Championships 1982
4	19 February 1982	(Norway) Oslo	10 km *	(Norway) Berit Aunli	(Finland) Hilkka Riihivuori	(Czechoslovakia) Květa Jeriová	
5	22 February 1982	(Norway) Oslo	5 km *	(Norway) Berit Aunli	(Finland) Hilkka Riihivuori	(Norway) Brit Pettersen	
6	26 February 1982	(Norway) Oslo	20 km *	(Soviet Union) Raisa Smetanina	(Norway) Berit Aunli	(Finland) Hilkka Riihivuori	
7	6 March 1982	(Finland) Lahti	10 km	(Norway) Anette Bøe	(Norway) Berit Aunli	(Norway) Inger Helene Nybråten	
8	12 March 1982	(Sweden) Falun	20 km	(Norway) Brit Pettersen	(Norway) Marit Myrmæl	(Norway) Anette Bøe	
9	28 March 1982	(Czechoslovakia) Štrbské Pleso	10 km	(Czechoslovakia) Blanka Paulů	(Norway) Berit Aunli	(West Germany) Karin Jäger	
10	13 April 1982	(Sweden) Kiruna	5 km	(Norway) Brit Pettersen	(Norway) Berit Aunli	(Norway) Inger Helene Nybråten	

=== Men's relay ===
Date	Venue	Event	Winner	Second	Third	Ref.
25 February 1982	(Norway) Oslo	Relay 4 × 10 km*	Norway Lars Erik Eriksen; Ove Aunli; Pål Gunnar Mikkelsplass; Oddvar Brå Soviet Union Vladimir Nikitin; Oleksandr Batyuk; Yuriy Burlakov; Alexander Zavyalov	none	Finland Kari Härkönen; Aki Karvonen; Harri Kirvesniemi; Juha Mieto East Germany Uwe Bellmann; Uwe Wünsch; Stefan Schicker; Frank Schröder	

=== Women's relay ===
Date	Venue	Event	Winner	Second	Third	Ref.
24 February 1982	(Norway) Oslo	Relay 4 × 5 km*	Norway Anette Bøe; Inger Helene Nybråten; Berit Aunli; Brit Pettersen	Soviet Union Lyubov Lyadova; Lyubov Zabolotskaya; Raisa Smetanina; Galina Kulakova	East Germany Petra Sölter; Carola Anding; Barbara Petzold; Veronika Hesse	

== Overall standings ==
=== Men's standings ===
Rank		Points
1	(United States) Bill Koch	121
2	(Sweden) Thomas Wassberg	114
3	(Finland) Harri Kirvesniemi	106
4	(France) Jean-Paul Pierrat	82
5	(Norway) Oddvar Brå	77
6	(West Germany) Jochen Behle	67
7	(Sweden) Jan Ottosson	60
	(United States) Dan Simoneau	60
9	(Italy) Giorgio Vanzetta	57
10	(Soviet Union) Yuriy Burlakov	56

=== Women's standings ===
Rank		Points
1	(Norway) Berit Aunli	136
2	(Norway) Brit Pettersen	126
3	(Czechoslovakia) Květa Jeriová	113
4	(Norway) Marit Myrmæl	104
5	(Norway) Anette Bøe	95
6	(Czechoslovakia) Anna Pasiarová	92
7	(Czechoslovakia) Blanka Paulů	81
8	(West Germany) Karin Jäger	79
9	(Norway) Inger Helene Nybråten	76
10	(Sweden) Marie Johansson	74

== Achievements ==
Victories in this World Cup

Men

- Bill Koch (USA), 4 first places
- Oddvar Brå (NOR), 2 first places
- Pål Gunnar Mikkelsplass (NOR), 1 first place
- Thomas Eriksson (SWE), 1 first place
- Thomas Wassberg (SWE), 1 first place
- Harri Kirvesniemi (FIN), 1 first place

Women

- Květa Jeriová (TCH), 3 first places
- Berit Aunli (NOR), 2 first places
- Brit Pettersen (NOR), 2 first place
- Raisa Smetanina (URS), 1 first place
- Anette Bøe (NOR), 1 first place
- Blanka Paulů (TCH), 1 first place
