= East Germany at the 1984 Winter Olympics =

- IOC code: GDR
- NOC: National Olympic Committee of the German Democratic Republic

in Sarajevo
- Competitors: 56 (40 men, 16 women) in 8 sports
- Flag bearer: Frank Ullrich (biathlon)
- Medals Ranked 1st: Gold 9 Silver 9 Bronze 6 Total 24

Winter Olympics appearances (overview)
- 1968; 1972; 1976; 1980; 1984; 1988

Other related appearances
- Germany (1928–1936, 1952, 1992–pres.); United Team of Germany (1956–1964)

East Germany (German Democratic Republic) competed at the 1984 Winter Olympics in Sarajevo, Yugoslavia.

== Medalists ==
Medal	Name	Sport	Event
Gold	Wolfgang Hoppe; Dietmar Schauerhammer	Bobsleigh	Two-man
Gold	Wolfgang Hoppe; Roland Wetzig; Dietmar Schauerhammer; Andreas Kirchner	Bobsleigh	Four-man
Gold	Katarina Witt	Figure skating	Women's singles
Gold	Steffi Walter-Martin	Luge	Women's individual
Gold	Jens Weißflog	Ski jumping	Men's normal hill
Gold	Christa Luding-Rothenburger	Speed skating	Women's 500m
Gold	Karin Kania-Enke	Speed skating	Women's 1000m
Gold	Karin Kania-Enke	Speed skating	Women's 1500m
Gold	Andrea Ehrig-Schöne-Mitscherlich	Speed skating	Women's 3000m
Silver	Frank-Peter Roetsch	Biathlon	Men's 20 km
Silver	Bernhard Lehmann; Bogdan Musiol	Bobsleigh	Two-man
Silver	Bernhard Lehmann; Bogdan Musiol; Ingo Voge; Eberhard Weise	Bobsleigh	Four-man
Silver	Bettina Schmidt	Luge	Women's individual
Silver	Jens Weißflog	Ski jumping	Men's large hill
Silver	Karin Kania-Enke	Speed skating	Women's 500m
Silver	Andrea Ehrig-Schöne-Mitscherlich	Speed skating	Women's 1000m
Silver	Andrea Ehrig-Schöne-Mitscherlich	Speed skating	Women's 1500m
Silver	Karin Kania-Enke	Speed skating	Women's 3000m
Bronze	Matthias Jacob	Biathlon	Men's 10 km Sprint
Bronze	Jörg Hoffmann; Jochen Pietzsch	Luge	Men's doubles
Bronze	Ute Oberhoffner-Weiß	Luge	Women's individual
Bronze	René Schöfisch	Speed skating	Men's 5000m
Bronze	René Schöfisch	Speed skating	Men's 10,000m
Bronze	Gabi Zange-Schönbrunn	Speed skating	Women's 3000m

== Biathlon ==
Men

Event	Athlete	Misses ^{1}	Time	Rank
10 km Sprint	Frank Ullrich	3	32:40.2	17
10 km Sprint	Frank-Peter Roetsch	2	31:49.8	7
10 km Sprint	Matthias Jacob	0	31:10.5	3rd place, bronze medalist(s)

Event	Athlete	Time	Penalties	Adjusted time ^{2}	Rank
20 km	Holger Wick	1'12:19.1	9	1'21:19.1	29
20 km	Frank Ullrich	1'11:53.7	3	1'14:53.7	5
20 km	Frank-Peter Roetsch	1'10:21.4	3	1'13:21.4	2nd place, silver medalist(s)

Men's 4 x 7.5 km relay

Athletes	Race		
Athletes	Misses ^{1}	Time	Rank
Holger Wick; Frank-Peter Roetsch; Matthias Jacob; Frank Ullrich	1	1'40:04.7	4

^{1} A penalty loop of 150 metres had to be skied per missed target.
^{2} One minute added per missed target.

== Bobsleigh ==
Sled	Athletes	Event	Run 1		Run 2		Run 3		Run 4		Total	
Sled	Athletes	Event	Time	Rank	Time	Rank	Time	Rank	Time	Rank	Time	Rank
GDR-1	Bernhard Lehmann; Bogdan Musioł	Two-man	51.59	3	51.94	3	51.15	2	51.36	4	3:26.04	2nd place, silver medalist(s)
GDR-2	Wolfgang Hoppe; Dietmar Schauerhammer	Two-man	51.51	1	51.93	2	51.06	1	51.06	1	3:25.56	1st place, gold medalist(s)

Sled	Athletes	Event	Run 1		Run 2		Run 3		Run 4		Total	
Sled	Athletes	Event	Time	Rank	Time	Rank	Time	Rank	Time	Rank	Time	Rank
GDR-1	Wolfgang Hoppe; Roland Wetzig; Dietmar Schauerhammer; Andreas Kirchner	Four-man	49.65	1	50.18	1	50.18	1	50.21	1	3:20.22	1st place, gold medalist(s)
GDR-2	Bernhard Lehmann; Bogdan Musioł; Ingo Voge; Eberhard Weise	Four-man	49.69	2	50.33	2	50.32	2	50.44	2	3:20.78	2nd place, silver medalist(s)

== Cross-country skiing ==
Men

Event	Athlete	Race	
Event	Athlete	Time	Rank
15 km	Karsten Brandt	45:40.1	41
15 km	Frank Schröder	43:52.1	26
15 km	Uwe Wünsch	43:49.9	23
15 km	Uwe Bellmann	42:35.8	7
30 km	Frank Schröder	1'39:01.4	43
30 km	Karsten Brandt	1'35:54.8	30
30 km	Uwe Wünsch	1'34:13.9	25
30 km	Uwe Bellmann	1'31:59.3	10
50 km	Uwe Bellmann	DNF	–
50 km	Uwe Wünsch	2'35:48.9	43

Men's 4 × 10 km relay

Athletes	Race	
Athletes	Time	Rank
Karsten Brandt; Uwe Wünsch; Frank Schröder; Uwe Bellmann	2'02:13.9	9

Women

Event	Athlete	Race	
Event	Athlete	Time	Rank
5 km	Petra Voge	19:16.6	36
5 km	Carola Anding	18:17.7	21
5 km	Petra Rohrmann	18:09.4	18
5 km	Ute Noack	17:46.0	8
10 km	Carola Anding	34:33.3	24
10 km	Petra Rohrmann	34:00.3	17
10 km	Ute Noack	33:37.5	15
20 km	Carola Anding	1'07:27.8	30
20 km	Petra Rohrmann	1'06:30.0	20
20 km	Ute Noack	1'05:43.5	18

Women's 4 × 5 km relay

Athletes	Race	
Athletes	Time	Rank
Petra Voge; Petra Rohrmann; Carola Anding; Ute Noack	1'11:10.7	8

== Figure skating ==
Men

Athlete	CF	SP	FS	TFP	Rank
Falko Kirsten	15	21	13	30.4	16

Women

Athlete	CF	SP	FS	TFP	Rank
Katarina Witt	3	1	1	3.2	1st place, gold medalist(s)

Pairs

Athletes	SP	FS	TFP	Rank
Babette Preußler; Tobias Schröter	14	11	18.0	11
Birgit Lorenz; Knut Schubert	5	5	7.5	5
Sabine Baeß; Tassilo Thierbach	4	4	6.0	4

== Luge ==
Men

Athlete	Run 1		Run 2		Run 3		Run 4		Total	
Athlete	Time	Rank	Time	Rank	Time	Rank	Time	Rank	Time	Rank
Norbert Loch	46.784	12	46.886	11	47.214	17	46.830	14	3:07.714	13
Michael Walter	46.196	4	46.305	4	46.358	7	46.172	6	3:05.031	4
Torsten Görlitzer	46.177	2	46.205	1	46.571	10	46.176	7	3:05.129	5

(Men's) Doubles

Athletes	Run 1		Run 2		Total	
Athletes	Time	Rank	Time	Rank	Time	Rank
Jörg Hoffmann; Jochen Pietzsch	41.996	3	41.891	4	1:23.887	3rd place, bronze medalist(s)
Hans-Joachim Menge; Detlef Bertz	46.935	15	47.238	15	1:34.173	15

Women

Athlete	Run 1		Run 2		Run 3		Run 4		Total	
Athlete	Time	Rank	Time	Rank	Time	Rank	Time	Rank	Time	Rank
Ute Oberhoffner-Weiß	41.908	3	41.945	3	41.793	3	41.602	2	2:47.248	3rd place, bronze medalist(s)
Bettina Schmidt	41.662	2	41.929	2	41.636	2	41.646	3	2:46.873	2nd place, silver medalist(s)
Steffi Walter-Martin	41.639	1	41.863	1	41.496	1	41.572	1	2:46.570	1st place, gold medalist(s)

== Nordic combined ==
Events:

- normal hill ski jumping (Three jumps, best two counted and shown here.)
- 15 km cross-country skiing

Athlete	Event	Ski Jumping				Cross-country			Total	
Athlete	Event	Distance 1	Distance 2	Points	Rank	Time	Points	Rank	Points	Rank
Andreas Langer	Individual	80.0	81.5	195.1	16	49:52.8	189.880	15	384.980	16
Uwe Dotzauer	Individual	81.0	85.0	199.5	12	48:56.8	198.280	7	397.780	7
Gunter Schmieder	Individual	86.5	87.0	208.4	4	51:16.3	177.355	24	385.755	15

== Ski jumping ==
Athlete	Event	Jump 1		Jump 2		Total	
Athlete	Event	Distance	Points	Distance	Points	Points	Rank
Holger Freitag	Normal hill	78.0	87.8	77.0	85.7	173.5	35
Stefan Stannarius	Normal hill	84.0	99.4	89.5	111.7	211.1	4
Klaus Ostwald	Normal hill	84.5	100.7	84.0	100.4	201.1	13
Jens Weißflog	Normal hill	90.0	110.5	87.0	104.7	215.2	1st place, gold medalist(s)
Klaus Ostwald	Large hill	98.5	89.6	95.0	82.2	171.8	26
Stefan Stannarius	Large hill	101.0	95.6	99.5	93.0	188.6	9
Matthias Buse	Large hill	102.0	97.0	93.0	79.9	176.9	21
Jens Weißflog	Large hill	107.0	106.0	107.5	107.7	213.7	2nd place, silver medalist(s)

== Speed skating ==
Men

Event	Athlete	Race	
Event	Athlete	Time	Rank
500 m	Andreas Dietel	39.45	20
500 m	André Hoffmann	38.87	11
500 m	Uwe-Jens Mey	38.66	8
1000 m	Uwe-Jens Mey	1:19.14	25
1000 m	Andreas Dietel	1:17.46	7
1000 m	André Hoffmann	1:16.85	5
1500 m	André Hoffmann	2:00.23	11
1500 m	Andreas Dietel	1:59.73	6
1500 m	Andreas Ehrig	1:59.41	5
5000 m	Andreas Ehrig	7:17.63	4
5000 m	René Schöfisch	7:17.49	3rd place, bronze medalist(s)
10,000 m	Andreas Dietel	16:01.89	32
10,000 m	Andreas Ehrig	15:03.76	11
10,000 m	René Schöfisch	14:46.91	3rd place, bronze medalist(s)

Women

Event	Athlete	Race	
Event	Athlete	Time	Rank
500 m	Skadi Walter	42.16	5
500 m	Karin Kania-Enke	41.28	2nd place, silver medalist(s)
500 m	Christa Luding-Rothenburger	41.02 OR	1st place, gold medalist(s)
1000 m	Christa Luding-Rothenburger	1:23.98	5
1000 m	Andrea Ehrig-Schöne-Mitscherlich	1:22.83	2nd place, silver medalist(s)
1000 m	Karin Kania-Enke	1:21.61 OR	1st place, gold medalist(s)
1500 m	Gabi Zange-Schönbrunn	2:07.69	4
1500 m	Andrea Ehrig-Schöne-Mitscherlich	2:05.29	2nd place, silver medalist(s)
1500 m	Karin Kania-Enke	2:03.42 WR	1st place, gold medalist(s)
3000 m	Gabi Zange-Schönbrunn	4:33.13	3rd place, bronze medalist(s)
3000 m	Karin Kania-Enke	4:26.33	2nd place, silver medalist(s)
3000 m	Andrea Ehrig-Schöne-Mitscherlich	4:24.79 OR	1st place, gold medalist(s)
