= East Germany at the 1980 Winter Olympics =

- Flag of East Germany
- IOC code: GDR
- NOC: National Olympic Committee of the German Democratic Republic

in Lake Placid
- Competitors: 53 (36 men, 17 women) in 8 sports
- Flag bearer: Jan Hoffmann (figure skating)
- Medals Ranked 2nd: Gold 9 Silver 7 Bronze 7 Total 23

Winter Olympics appearances (overview)
- 1968; 1972; 1976; 1980; 1984; 1988

Other related appearances
- Germany (1928–1936, 1952, 1992–); United Team of Germany (1956–1964)

East Germany (German Democratic Republic) competed at the 1980 Winter Olympics in Lake Placid, United States.

== Medalists ==
East Germany finished in second position in the final medal rankings, with 9 gold medals and 23 medals overall.

Medal	Name	Sport	Event
Gold	Frank Ullrich	Biathlon	Men's 10 km sprint
Gold	Meinhard Nehmer; Bernhard Germeshausen; Bogdan Musiol; Hans-Jürgen Gerhardt	Bobsleigh	Four-man
Gold	Barbara Petzold	Cross-country skiing	Women's 10 km
Gold	Marlies Rostock; Carola Anding; Veronika Hesse-Schmidt; Barbara Petzold	Cross-country skiing	Women's 4 × 5 km relay
Gold	Anett Pötzsch	Figure skating	Women's singles
Gold	Bernhard Glass	Luge	Men's individual
Gold	Hans Rinn; Norbert Hahn	Luge	Men's doubles
Gold	Ulrich Wehling	Nordic combined	Men's individual
Gold	Karin Kania-Enke	Speed skating	Women's 500m
Silver	Frank Ullrich	Biathlon	Men's 20 km
Silver	Mathias Jung; Klaus Siebert; Frank Ullrich; Eberhard Rösch	Biathlon	Men's 4 x 7.5 km relay
Silver	Bernhard Germeshausen; Hans-Jürgen Gerhardt	Bobsleigh	Two-man
Silver	Jan Hoffmann	Figure skating	Men's singles
Silver	Melitta Sollman	Luge	Women's individual
Silver	Manfred Deckert	Ski jumping	Men's normal hill
Silver	Sabine Becker	Speed skating	Women's 3000m
Bronze	Eberhard Rösch	Biathlon	Men's 20 km
Bronze	Meinhard Nehmer; Bogdan Musiol	Bobsleigh	Two-man
Bronze	Horst Schönau; Roland Wetzig; Detlef Richter; Andreas Kirchner	Bobsleigh	Four-man
Bronze	Manuela Mager; Uwe Bewersdorff	Figure skating	Pairs
Bronze	Konrad Winkler	Nordic combined	Men's individual
Bronze	Sylvia Albrecht	Speed skating	Women's 1000m
Bronze	Sabine Becker	Speed skating	Women's 1500m

== Biathlon ==
Men

Event	Athlete	Misses ^{1}	Time	Rank
10 km Sprint	Mathias Jung	4	35:50.36	21
10 km Sprint	Klaus Siebert	2	33:32.76	4
10 km Sprint	Frank Ullrich	2	32:10.69	1st place, gold medalist(s)

Event	Athlete	Time	Penalties	Adjusted time ^{2}	Rank
20 km	Klaus Siebert	1'07:48.71	6	1'13:48.71	15
20 km	Eberhard Rösch	1'09:11.73	2	1'11:11.73	3rd place, bronze medalist(s)
20 km	Frank Ullrich	1'05:27.79	3	1'08:27.79	2nd place, silver medalist(s)

Men's 4 x 7.5 km relay

Athletes	Race		
Athletes	Misses ^{1}	Time	Rank
Mathias Jung; Klaus Siebert; Frank Ullrich; Eberhard Rösch	3	1'34:56.99	2nd place, silver medalist(s)

^{1} A penalty loop of 150 metres had to be skied per missed target.
^{2} One minute added per close miss (a hit in the outer ring), two minutes added per complete miss.

== Bobsleigh ==
Sled	Athletes	Event	Run 1		Run 2		Run 3		Run 4		Total	
Sled	Athletes	Event	Time	Rank	Time	Rank	Time	Rank	Time	Rank	Time	Rank
GDR-1	Meinhard Nehmer; Bogdan Musioł	Two-man	1:02.39	3	1:02.88	4	1:02.86	3	1:02.95	4	4:11.08	3rd place, bronze medalist(s)
GDR-2	Bernhard Germeshausen; Hans-Jürgen Gerhardt	Two-man	1:02.58	4	1:02.48	1	1:03.31	9	1:02.56	2	4:10.93	2nd place, silver medalist(s)

Sled	Athletes	Event	Run 1		Run 2		Run 3		Run 4		Total	
Sled	Athletes	Event	Time	Rank	Time	Rank	Time	Rank	Time	Rank	Time	Rank
GDR-1	Meinhard Nehmer; Bernhard Germeshausen; Bogdan Musioł; Hans-Jürgen Gerhardt	Four-man	59.86	1	1:00.03	1	59.73	1	1:00.30	2	3:59.92	1st place, gold medalist(s)
GDR-2	Horst Schönau; Roland Wetzig; Detlef Richter; Andreas Kirchner	Four-man	1:00.24	2	1:00.35	2	1:00.04	3	1:00.34	3	4:00.97	3rd place, bronze medalist(s)

== Cross-country skiing ==
Men

Event	Athlete	Race	
Event	Athlete	Time	Rank
15 km	Alf-Gerd Deckert	45:00.40	37
30 km	Alf-Gerd Deckert	1'30:05.17	9
50 km	Alf-Gerd Deckert	2'38:13.53	26

Women

Event	Athlete	Race	
Event	Athlete	Time	Rank
5 km	Ute Nesstler	15:53.38	16
5 km	Marlies Rostock	15:36.28	9
5 km	Veronika Hesse-Schmidt	15:31.83	7
5 km	Barbara Petzold	15:23.62	4
10 km	Carola Anding	31:45.82	12
10 km	Veronika Hesse-Schmidt	31:29.14	8
10 km	Marlies Rostock	31:28.79	7
10 km	Barbara Petzold	30:31.54	1st place, gold medalist(s)

Women's 4 × 5 km relay

Athletes	Race	
Athletes	Time	Rank
Marlies Rostock; Carola Anding; Veronika Hesse-Schmidt; Barbara Petzold	1'02:11.10	1st place, gold medalist(s)

== Figure skating ==
Men

Athlete	CF	SP	FS	Points	Places	Rank
Hermann Schulz	9	9	13	166.70	98	11
Jan Hoffmann	1	2	2	189.72	15	2nd place, silver medalist(s)

Women

Athlete	CF	SP	FS	Points	Places	Rank
Anett Pötzsch	1	4	3	189.00	11	1st place, gold medalist(s)

Pairs

Athletes	SP	FS	Points	Places	Rank
Sabine Baeß; Tassilo Thierbach	6	6	136.00	53	6
Manuela Mager; Uwe Bewersdorff	4	3	140.52	33	3rd place, bronze medalist(s)

== Luge ==
Men

Athlete	Run 1		Run 2		Run 3		Run 4		Total	
Athlete	Time	Rank	Time	Rank	Time	Rank	Time	Rank	Time	Rank
Hans Rinn	43.802	6	1:24.301	26	DNF	–	–	–	DNF	–
Bernhard Glass	43.609	4	43.780	2	43.925	3	43.482	1	2:54.796	1st place, gold medalist(s)
Dettlef Günther	43.199	1	43.555	1	46.879	23	43.530	2	2:57.163	4

(Men's) Doubles

Athletes	Run 1		Run 2		Total	
Athletes	Time	Rank	Time	Rank	Time	Rank
Hans Rinn; Norbert Hahn	39.303	1	40.028	2	1:19.331	1st place, gold medalist(s)
Bernd Hahn; Ulli Hahn	39.972	8	39.942	1	1:19.914	4

Women

Athlete	Run 1		Run 2		Run 3		Run 4		Total	
Athlete	Time	Rank	Time	Rank	Time	Rank	Time	Rank	Time	Rank
Margit Schumann	39.611	7	39.715	6	39.567	4	39.262	2	2:38.255	6
Ilona Brand	39.393	4	39.506	4	39.700	6	39.516	6	2:38.115	5
Melitta Sollman	39.289	2	39.640	5	39.360	2	39.368	3	2:37.657	2nd place, silver medalist(s)

== Nordic combined ==
Events:

- normal hill ski jumping (Three jumps, best two counted and shown here.)
- 15 km cross-country skiing

Athlete	Event	Ski Jumping				Cross-country			Total	
Athlete	Event	Distance 1	Distance 2	Points	Rank	Time	Points	Rank	Points	Rank
Uwe Dotzauer	Individual	80.5	81.0	217.6	4	49:52.4	200.815	13	418.415	5
Ulrich Wehling	Individual	80.0	85.0	227.2	1	49:24.5	205.000	9	432.200	1st place, gold medalist(s)
Gunter Schmieder	Individual	79.0	80.0	201.7	11	49:42.0	202.375	11	404.075	8
Konrad Winkler	Individual	81.0	83.5	214.5	5	48:45.7	210.820	8	425.320	3rd place, bronze medalist(s)

== Ski jumping ==
Athlete	Event	Jump 1		Jump 2		Total	
Athlete	Event	Distance	Points	Distance	Points	Points	Rank
Henry Glaß	Normal hill	81.0	114.8	81.5	116.6	231.4	15
Martin Weber	Normal hill	83.0	118.5	83.5	118.3	236.8	11
Jochen Danneberg	Normal hill	83.5	118.8	77.0	103.9	222.7	20
Manfred Deckert	Normal hill	85.0	121.7	88.0	127.5	249.2	2nd place, silver medalist(s)
Harald Duschek	Large hill	95.5	98.9	95.0	99.7	198.6	33
Henry Glaß	Large hill	98.5	105.6	110.5	126.4	232.0	11
Manfred Deckert	Large hill	102.0	111.0	100.0	108.2	219.2	20
Klaus Ostwald	Large hill	107.0	119.0	98.5	106.1	225.1	15

== Speed skating ==
Men

Event	Athlete	Race	
Event	Athlete	Time	Rank
500 m	Andreas Dietel	39.21	13
500 m	Steffen Doering	39.06	11
1000 m	Steffen Doering	1:21.19	26
1000 m	Andreas Dietel	1:17.71	7
1500 m	Andreas Ehrig	1:59.47	9
1500 m	Andreas Dietel	1:57.14	4
5000 m	Andreas Ehrig	7:14.56	10
10,000 m	Andreas Dietel	15:15.03	15
10,000 m	Andreas Ehrig	14:51.94	8

Women

Event	Athlete	Race	
Event	Athlete	Time	Rank
500 m	Christa Luding-Rothenburger	43.60	12
500 m	Cornelia Jacob	42.98	6
500 m	Karin Kania-Enke	41.78 OR	1st place, gold medalist(s)
1000 m	Christa Luding-Rothenburger	1:29.69	18
1000 m	Karin Kania-Enke	1:26.66	4
1000 m	Sylvia Albrecht	1:26.46	3rd place, bronze medalist(s)
1500 m	Sylvia Albrecht	2:14.27	9
1500 m	Andrea Ehrig-Schöne-Mitscherlich	2:13.05	6
1500 m	Sabine Becker	2:12.38	3rd place, bronze medalist(s)
3000 m	Sylvia Albrecht	4:47.76	14
3000 m	Andrea Ehrig-Schöne-Mitscherlich	4:37.69	4
3000 m	Sabine Becker	4:32.79	2nd place, silver medalist(s)
