= Marit Myrmæl =

Norwegian cross-country skier

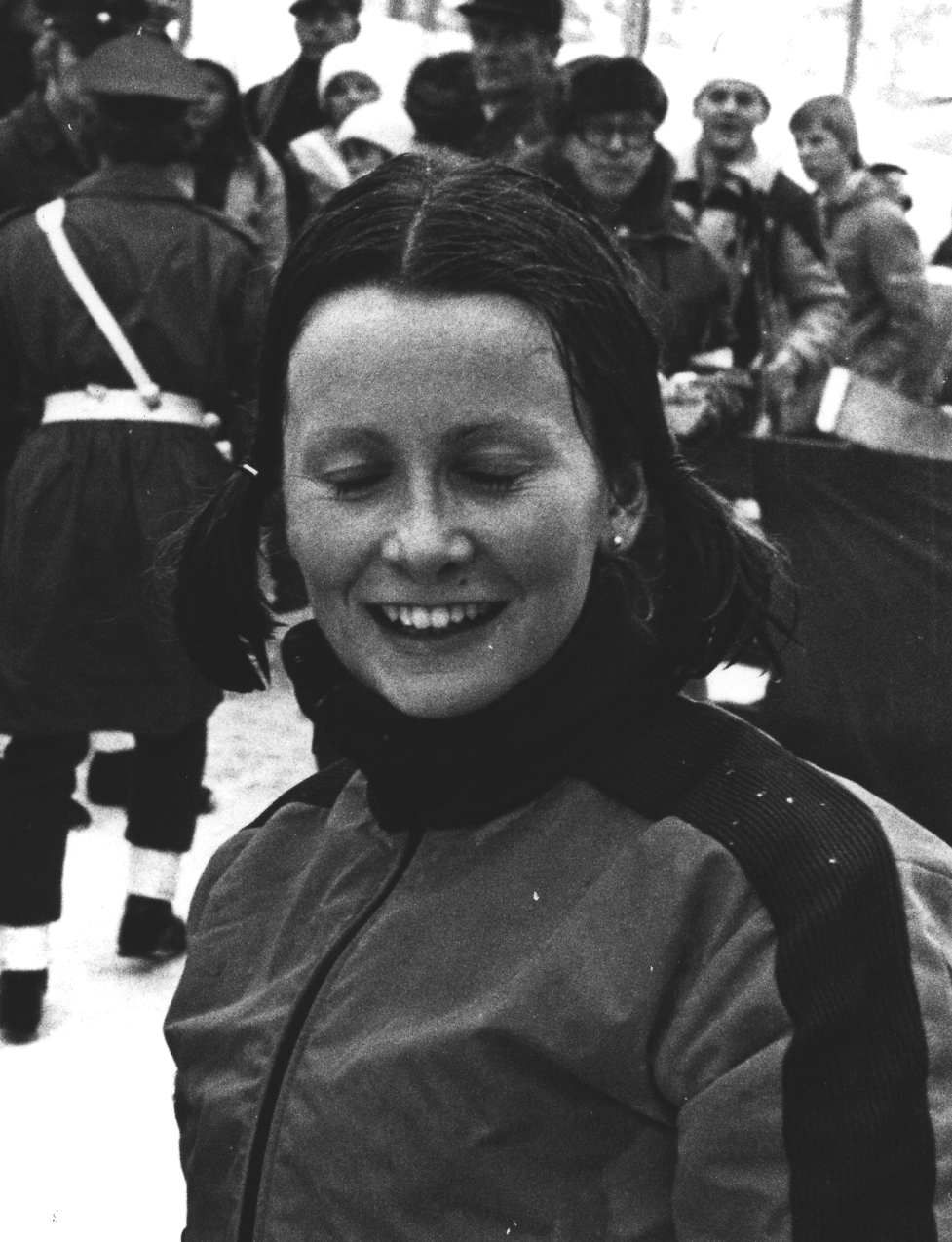
- Myrmæl in March 1977

Personal information
- Nationality: Norway
- Born: 20 January 1954 (age 72) Meldal Municipality, Norway

Sport
- Sport: Skiing
- Club: Meldal IL

World Cup career
- Seasons: 3 – (1982–1984)
- Indiv. starts: 17
- Indiv. podiums: 2
- Indiv. wins: 0
- Team starts: 0
- Overall titles: 0 – (4th in 1982)
Medal record
Women's cross-country skiing
Representing Norway
Olympic Games
Bronze medal – third place	1980 Lake Placid	4 × 5 km relay

Marit Myrmæl (born 20 January 1954) is a Norwegian cross-country skier who competed during the early 1980s.

She won a bronze medal in the 4 × 5 km relay at the 1980 Winter Olympics in Lake Placid, New York. Myrmæl's best career finish was second at a 20 km event in Sweden in 1982.

In 1978 she won the silver medal at the Norwegian championships in 10 km cross-country running, representing Meldal IL. On the same distance she won one bronze medal (1977).

== Cross-country skiing results ==
All results are sourced from the International Ski Federation (FIS).

=== Olympic Games ===
- 1 medal – (1 bronze)

Year	Age	5 km	10 km	20 km	4 × 5 km relay
1976	22	18	24	—N/a	5
1980	26	18	20	—N/a	Bronze
1984	30	—	7	14	—

=== World Championships ===
Year	Age	5 km	10 km	20 km	4 × 5 km relay
1978	24	10	15	18	5
1980	26	—N/a	—N/a	23	—N/a
1982	28	9	—	6	—

=== World Cup ===
==== Season standings ====
Season	Age	Overall
1982	28	4
1983	29	15
1984	30	19

==== Individual podiums ====
- 2 podiums

No.	Season	Date	Location	Race	Level	Place
1	1981–82	15 January 1982	La Bresse, France	5 km Individual	World Cup	3rd
2	1981–82	12 March 1982	Falun, Sweden	20 km Individual	World Cup	2nd
