= Ulla Maaskola =

Finnish cross-country skier

Personal information
- Nationality: Finland
- Born: 5 April 1959 (age 67) Sippola, Finland

Sport
- Sport: Skiing
- Club: Lohjan Louhi

World Cup career
- Seasons: 3 – (1983–1984, 1986)
- Indiv. starts: 3
- Indiv. podiums: 0
- Team starts: 1
- Team podiums: 0
- Overall titles: 0

Ulla Maaskola (born 5 April 1959) is a Finnish cross-country skier. She competed in the women's 10 kilometres at the 1980 Winter Olympics.

== Cross-country skiing results ==
=== Olympic Games ===
Year	Age	5 km	10 km	4 × 5 km relay
1980	20	—	32	—

=== World Cup ===
==== Season standings ====
Season	Age	Overall
1983	23	NC
1984	24	NC
1986	26	NC
