= Hege Peikli =

Norwegian cross-country skier

Personal information
- Nationality: Norwegian
- Born: 23 April 1957 (age 69) Oslo

Sport
- Sport: Cross-country skiing
- Club: Lambertseter IL

Hege Peikli (born 23 April 1957) is a Norwegian cross-country skier. She was born in Oslo, and represented the club Lambertseter IL. She competed at the 1980 Winter Olympics in Lake Placid, where she placed 37th in the 10 km.

== Cross-country skiing results ==
=== Olympic Games ===
Year	Age	5 km	10 km	4 × 5 km relay
1980	22	—	37	—
