= Hilde Riis =

Norwegian cross-country skier

Personal information
- Nationality: Norwegian
- Born: 6 May 1959 (age 66) Lørenskog

Sport
- Sport: Cross-country skiing
- Club: Sylling IF

Achievements and titles
- Olympic finals: 1980 Winter Olympics

Hilde Synnøve Riis (born 6 May 1959) is a Norwegian cross-country skier. She was born in Lørenskog, and represented the club Sylling IF. She competed at the 1980 Winter Olympics in Lake Placid, where she placed 30th in the 10 km.

== Cross-country skiing results ==
=== Olympic Games ===
Year	Age	5 km	10 km	4 × 5 km relay
1980	20	—	30	—
