= Iraida Suslova =

Soviet cross-country skier

Personal information
- Nationality: Soviet Union
- Born: 16 January 1955 (age 71)

Sport
- Sport: Cross-country skiing

Iraida Suslova (born 16 January 1955) is a Soviet cross-country skier. She competed in the women's 10 kilometres at the 1980 Winter Olympics.

== Cross-country skiing results ==
=== Olympic Games ===
Year	Age	5 km	10 km	4 × 5 km relay
1980	25	—	14	—
