= Keijo Korhonen =

Keijo Korhonen may refer to:

- Keijo Korhonen (politician) (1934–2022), Finnish politician, ambassador, and professor
- Keijo Korhonen (ski jumper) (born 1956), Finnish ski jumper
