= Marja Auroma =

Finnish cross-country skier

Personal information
- Nationality: Finland
- Born: July 29, 1949 (age 76) Mikkeli, Finland

Sport
- Sport: Skiing

World Cup career
- Seasons: 3 – (1982–1984)
- Indiv. starts: 3
- Indiv. podiums: 0
- Team starts: 0
- Overall titles: 0 – (54th in 1982)

Marja Auroma (born 29 July 1949) is a Finnish cross-country skier. She competed in two events at the 1980 Winter Olympics.

== Cross-country skiing results ==
=== Olympic Games ===
Year	Age	5 km	10 km	4 × 5 km relay
1980	30	25	—	5

=== World Championships ===
Year	Age	5 km	10 km	20 km	4 × 5 km relay
1978	28	19	—	—	—

=== World Cup ===
==== Season standings ====
Season	Age	Overall
1982	32	54
1983	33	NC
1984	34	NC
