= Nina Rocheva =

Soviet cross-country skier (1948–2022)

Medal record

Women's cross-country skiing

Representing the Soviet Union

Olympic Games
| Silver medal – second place | 1980 Lake Placid | 4 × 5 km relay |

World Championships
| Gold medal – first place | 1974 Falun | 4 × 5 km relay |
| Bronze medal – third place | 1978 Lahti | 4 × 5 km relay |

Nina Petrovna Rocheva (Russian: Нина Петровна Рочева, née Selyunina; 13 October 1948 – 8 January 2022) was a Soviet cross-country skier who competed from 1978 to 1980. She won a silver medal in the 4 × 5 km relay at the 1980 Winter Olympics in Lake Placid, New York.

Rocheva also earned two medals in the 4 × 5 km relay at the world ski championships: gold (under her maiden name Selyunina at the 1974 Championships in Falun, Sweden, and bronze at the 1978 World Championships in Lahti, Finland.

She was married to the Soviet Olympic champion in cross-country skiing Vasily (Pavlovich) Rochev, she is the mother of Russian cross-country skier Vasily (Vasilyevich) Rochev, also an Olympic medalist in that discipline. She died on 8 January 2022, at the age of 73.

== Cross-country skiing results ==
=== Olympic Games ===
- 1 medal – (1 silver)

| Year | Age | 5 km | 10 km | 4 × 5 km relay |
|---|---|---|---|---|
| 1980 | 31 | 15 | — | 2nd |

=== World Championships ===
- 2 medals – (1 gold, 1 bronze)

| Year | Age | 5 km | 10 km | 20 km | 4 × 5 km relay |
|---|---|---|---|---|---|
| 1974 | 25 | — | — | — | 1st |
| 1978 | 29 | — | 8 | — | 3rd |
