= Ute Nestler =

German cross-country skier (born 1960)

Personal information
- Nationality: German
- Born: 31 December 1960 (age 65) Annaberg-Buchholz, East Germany

Sport
- Sport: Cross-country skiing

Ute Nestler (born 31 December 1960) is a German former cross-country skier. She competed in the women's 5 kilometres at the 1980 Winter Olympics.

== Cross-country skiing results ==
=== Olympic Games ===
Year	Age	5 km	10 km	4 × 5 km relay
1980	19	16	—	—
