= Karin Lamberg-Skog =

Swedish cross-country skier

Personal information
- Nationality: Sweden
- Born: 17 January 1961 (age 65) Uppsala, Sweden

Sport
- Sport: Skiing
- Club: IFK Mora

World Cup career
- Seasons: 7 – (1982, 1984–1989)
- Indiv. starts: 21
- Indiv. podiums: 0
- Team starts: 8
- Team podiums: 5
- Team wins: 1
- Overall titles: 0 – (18th in 1986)
Medal record
Women's cross-country skiing
Representing Sweden
World Championships
Bronze medal – third place	1987 Oberstdorf	4 × 5 km relay
Junior World Championships
Bronze medal – third place	1980 Örnsköldsvik	3 × 5 km relay

Karin Ingrid Lamberg-Skog (born 17 January 1961) is a Swedish former cross-country skier who competed during the 1980s. She won a bronze medal in the 4 × 5 km relay at the 1987 FIS Nordic World Ski Championships in Oberstdorf and finished 18th in the ten km event at those championships.

Lamberg-Skog's best individual finish at the Winter Olympics was 16th in the five km event at Sarajevo in 1984. Her best career individual finish was fifth in a ten km event in Finland in 1988.

== Cross-country skiing results ==
All results are sourced from the International Ski Federation (FIS).

=== Olympic Games ===
Year	Age	5 km	10 km	20 km	4 × 5 km relay
1980	19	17	17	—N/a	6
1984	23	16	18	—	5
1988	27	—	—	22	6

=== World Championships ===
- 1 medals – (1 bronze)

Year	Age	5 km	10 km classical	10 km freestyle	15 km	20 km	30 km	4 × 5 km relay
1982	21	30	—	—N/a	—N/a	—	—N/a	6
1985	24	20	18	—N/a	—N/a	22	—N/a	7
1987	26	—	22	—N/a	—N/a	—	—N/a	Bronze
1989	28	—N/a	—	—	16	—N/a	16	—

=== World Cup ===
==== Season standings ====
Season	Age	Overall
1982	21	37
1984	23	41
1985	24	19
1986	25	18
1987	26	46
1988	27	25
1989	28	50

==== Team podiums ====
- 1 victory
- 5 podiums

No.	Season	Date	Location	Race	Level	Place	Teammates
1	1984–85	10 March 1985	Falun, Sweden	4 × 5 km Relay	World Cup	2nd	Risby / Johansson / Fritzon
2	1984–85	17 March 1985	Oslo, Norway	4 × 5 km Relay	World Cup	2nd	Johansson / Mörtberg / Fritzon
3	1985–86	13 March 1986	Oslo, Norway	4 × 5 km Relay F	World Cup	1st	Frost / Görlin / Dahlman
4	1986–87	17 February 1987	Oberstdorf, West Germany	4 × 5 km Relay F	World Championships^{[1]}	3rd	Wallin / Dahlman / Westin
5	1988–88	12 March 1989	Falun, Sweden	4 × 5 km Relay C	World Cup	3rd	Svingstedt / Wallin / Fritzon

Note: ^{1} Until the 1999 World Championships, World Championship races were included in the World Cup scoring system.
