= Marie Svan =

Swedish cross-country skier (born 1963)

Personal information
- Full name: Karin Marie Svan
- Nationality: Sweden
- Born: 30 June 1963 (age 63) Furudal, Sweden
- Spouse: Gunde Svan

Sport
- Sport: Skiing

World Cup career
- Seasons: 5 – (1984–1988)
- Indiv. starts: 20
- Indiv. podiums: 1
- Indiv. wins: 0
- Team starts: 3
- Team podiums: 2
- Team wins: 0
- Overall titles: 0 – (17th in 1987)

Marie Svan (née Johansson; born 30 June 1963) is a Swedish cross-country skier. She competed in the women's 5 kilometre classical at the 1988 Winter Olympics. She is married to fellow skier Gunde Svan.

== Cross-country skiing results ==
All results are sourced from the International Ski Federation (FIS).

=== Olympic Games ===
Year	Age	5 km	10 km	20 km	4 × 5 km relay
1988	24	21	—	—	—

=== World Championships ===
Year	Age	5 km	10 km	20 km	4 × 5 km relay
1985	21	17	33	26	7
1987	23	19	—	—	—

=== World Cup ===
==== Season standings ====
Season	Age	Overall
1984	20	30
1985	21	23
1986	22	29
1987	23	17
1988	24	NC

==== Individual podiums ====
- 1 podium

No.	Season	Date	Location	Race	Level	Place
1	1986–87	13 December 1986	Val di Sole, Italy	5 km Individual C	World Cup	2nd

==== Team podiums ====
- 2 podiums

No.	Season	Date	Location	Race	Level	Place	Teammates
1	1984–85	10 March 1985	Falun, Sweden	4 × 5 km Relay	World Cup	2nd	Risby / Fritzon / Lamberg-Skog
2	1984–85	17 March 1985	Oslo, Norway	4 × 5 km Relay	World Cup	2nd	Mörtberg / Fritzon / Lamberg-Skog
