= Alison Owen-Spencer =

American cross-country skier

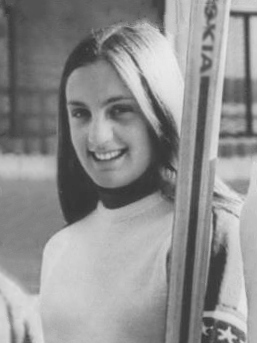
- Owen-Spencer in 1972

Personal information
- Born: January 5, 1953 (age 73) Kalispell, Montana, U.S.
- Height: 170 cm (5 ft 7 in)
- Weight: 57 kg (126 lb)

Sport
- Sport: Cross-country skiing
- Club: University of Colorado Racing Club

Alison Owen-Spencer (later Kiesel, born January 5, 1953) is a retired American cross-country skier. She competed in the 5 km, 10 km and relay events at the 1972 and 1980 Winter Olympics with the best individual result of 22nd place in 1980. She finished seventh in the 1978–79 World Cup (a concept under test at the time by the FIS), winning a 5 km race at Cable, Wisconsin in December 1978. In 1979 she won the national 5 km and 10 km titles.

Owen-Spencer studied at Alaska Methodist University, where she met her future husband, Joe Spencer, but the marriage did not last.

== Cross-country skiing results ==
=== Olympic Games ===
Year	Age	5 km	10 km	3/4 × 5 km relay
1972	19	36	35	11
1980	27	22	22	7

=== World Championships ===
Year	Age	5 km	10 km	20 km	4 × 5 km relay
1978	25	23	24	—	8
