= Frank Schröder =

East German cross-country skier (born 1962)

Personal information
- Nationality: Germany
- Born: 6 March 1962 (age 64) Altenburg, East Germany

Sport
- Sport: Skiing
- Club: SC Dynamo Klingenthal

World Cup career
- Seasons: 2 – (1982, 1984)
- Indiv. starts: 3
- Indiv. podiums: 0
- Team starts: 2
- Team podiums: 1
- Team wins: 0
- Overall titles: 0 – (61st in 1982)
Medal record
Representing East Germany
Men's cross-country skiing
World Championships
Bronze medal – third place	1982 Oslo	4 × 10 km relay
Junior World Championships
Bronze medal – third place	1981 Schonach	3 × 5 km relay

Frank Schröder (born 6 March 1962 in Altenburg) is an East German cross-country skier who competed in the early 1980s. He won a bronze medal in the 4 × 10 km relay at the 1982 FIS Nordic World Ski Championships (Tied with Finland). Schröder also finished 15th in the 15 km event at those same championships. He also competed at the 1984 Winter Olympics.

He has created tone arms and handmade audiophile tonearms.

== Cross-country skiing results ==
All results are sourced from the International Ski Federation (FIS).

=== Olympic Games ===
Year	Age	15 km	30 km	50 km	4 × 10 km relay
1984	22	26	43	—	9

=== World Championships ===
- 1 medal – (1 bronze)

Year	Age	15 km	30 km	50 km	4 × 10 km relay
1982	20	15	21	—	Bronze
1985	23	30	42	47	—

=== World Cup ===
==== Season standings ====
Season	Age	Overall
1982	20	61
1984	22	NC

==== Team podiums ====
- 1 podium

No.	Season	Date	Location	Race	Level	Place	Teammate(s)
1	1981–82	25 February 1982	Oslo, Norway	4 × 10 km Relay	World Championships^{[1]}	3rd	Bellmann / Wünsch / Schicker

Note: ^{1} Until the 1999 World Championships, World Championship races were included in the World Cup scoring system.
