= Simoneau =

Simoneau is a surname. Notable people with the surname include:

- Charlotte Simoneau (born 2005), Canadian weightlifter
- Dan Simoneau (born 1959), American cross-country skier
- Mark Simoneau (born 1977), American linebacker
- Léopold Simoneau (1916–2006), French-Canadian tenor
- Yves Simoneau (born 1955), Canadian film and TV director
- Wayne Simoneau (1935–2017), American politician
- Jacqueline Simoneau (born 1996), Canadian Olympian synchronized swimmer
