= Karin Svingstedt =

Swedish skier

Personal information
- Full name: Karin Sofia Svingstedt
- Nationality: Sweden
- Born: 13 November 1964 (age 61) Hassela, Sweden

Sport
- Sport: Skiing

World Cup career
- Seasons: 1984, 1987–1996
- Indiv. starts: 39
- Indiv. podiums: 0
- Team starts: 4
- Team podiums: 1
- Team wins: 0
- Overall titles: 0 – (24th in 1989)

Karin Svingstedt (born 13 November 1964) is a Swedish cross-country skier. She competed in two events at the 1988 Winter Olympics.

== Cross-country skiing results ==
All results are sourced from the International Ski Federation (FIS).

=== Olympic Games ===
Year	Age	5 km	10 km	20 km	4 × 5 km relay
1988	23	23	22	—	—

=== World Championships ===
Year	Age	5 km	10 km classical	10 km freestyle	15 km	Pursuit	30 km	4 × 5 km relay
1989	24	—N/a	16	15	—	—N/a	27	4
1991	26	35	—N/a	—	26	—N/a	21	—
1993	28	—	—N/a	—N/a	27	—	36	—

=== World Cup ===
==== Season standings ====
Season	Age	Overall
1984	19	NC
1987	22	NC
1988	23	39
1989	24	24
1990	25	NC
1991	26	39
1992	27	NC
1993	28	44
1994	29	NC
1995	30	70
1996	31	NC

==== Team podiums ====
- 1 podium

No.	Season	Date	Location	Race	Level	Place	Teammates
1	1988–89	12 March 1989	Falun, Sweden	4 × 5 km Relay C	World Cup	3rd	Wallin / Lamberg-Skog / Fritzon
