= Petra Voge =

East German cross-country skier (born 1962)

Personal information
- Nationality: Germany
- Born: 23 October 1962 (age 63) Elbingerode, East Germany

Sport
- Sport: Skiing
- Club: ASK Vorwärts Oberhof

World Cup career
- Seasons: 3 – (1982–1984)
- Indiv. starts: 5
- Indiv. podiums: 0
- Team starts: 1
- Team podiums: 1
- Team wins: 0
- Overall titles: 0 – (27th in 1982)
Medal record
Women's cross-country skiing
Representing East Germany
World Championships
Bronze medal – third place	1982 Oslo	4 × 5 km relay

Petra Voge (née Sölter) (born 23 October 1962) is an East German cross-country skier who competed in the 1980s. She won a bronze medal in the 4 × 5 km relay at the 1982 FIS Nordic World Ski Championships in Oslo and finished seventh in the 5 km at those same championships. At the 1984 Winter Olympics in Sarajevo, she finished eighth in the 4 × 5 km relay.

== Cross-country skiing results ==
All results are sourced from the International Ski Federation (FIS).

=== World Championships ===
- 1 medals – (1 bronze)

Year	Age	5 km	10 km	20 km	4 × 5 km relay
1982	19	7	—	19	Bronze

=== World Cup ===
==== Season standings ====
Season	Age	Overall
1982	19	27
1983	20	34
1984	21	60

==== Team podiums ====
- 1 podium

No.	Season	Date	Location	Race	Level	Place	Teammates
1	1981–82	24 February 1982	Oslo, Norway	4 × 5 km Relay	World Championships^{[1]}	3rd	Anding / Schmidt / Petzold

Note: ^{1} Until the 1999 World Championships, World Championship races were included in the World Cup scoring system.
