= Magdalena Forsberg =

Swedish biathlete and cross-country skier

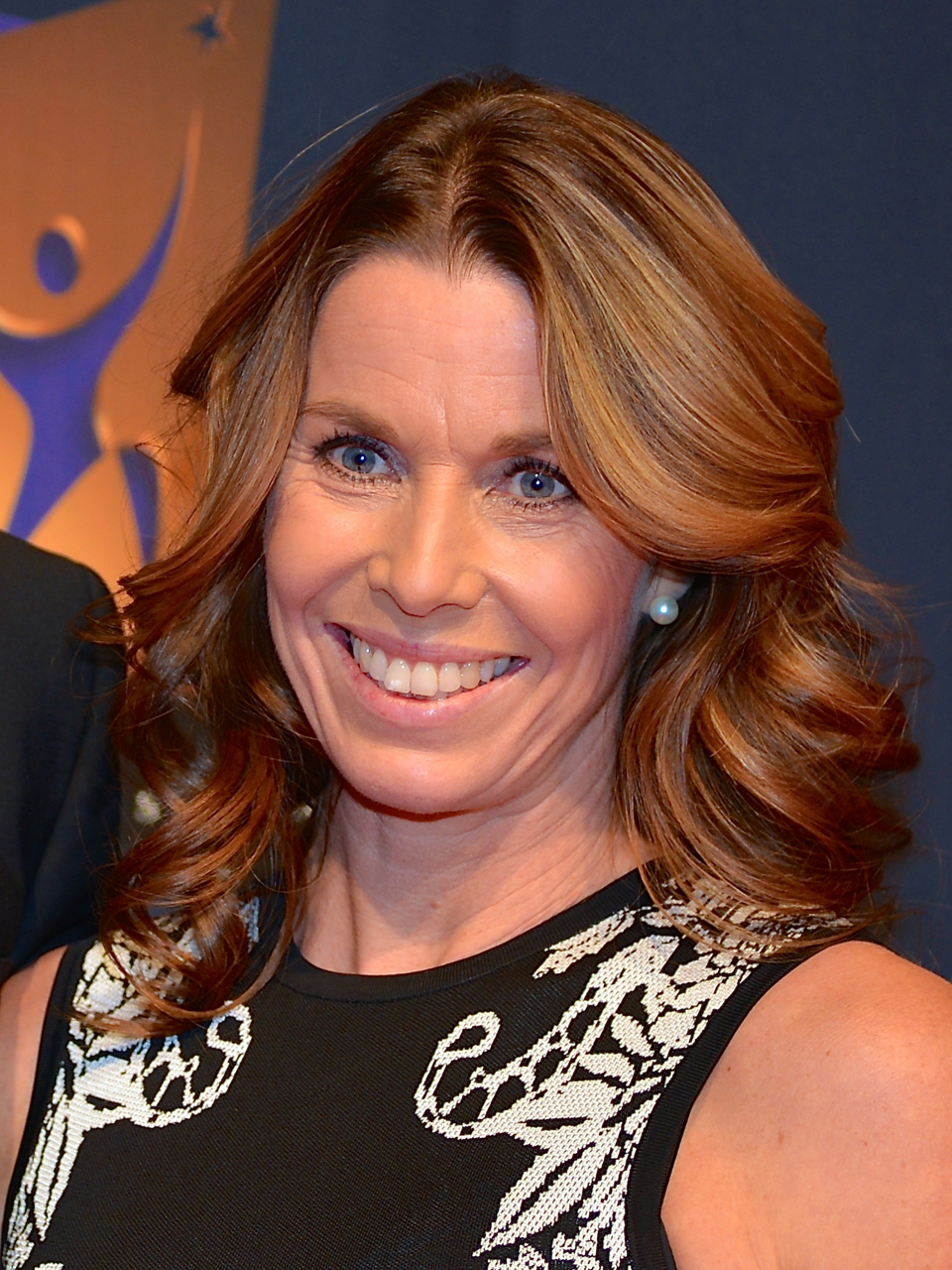
- Magdalena Forsberg during the Swedish Sports Awards inside the Stockholm Globe Arena in Stockholm, Sweden in January 2014

Personal information
- Full name: Maria Magdalena Forsberg
- Nickname: Magda
- Born: Magdalena Wallin; 25 July 1967 (age 58) Ullånger, Sweden
- Height: 1.66 m (5 ft 5 in)

Sport

Professional information
- Sport: Biathlon
- Club: Sundsvall Biathlon
- World Cup debut: 8 December 1994
- Retired: 24 March 2002

Olympic Games
- Teams: 2 (1998, 2002)
- Medals: 2 (0 gold)

World Championships
- Teams: 8 (1995, 1996, 1997, 1998, 1999, 2000, 2001, 2002)
- Medals: 12 (6 gold)

World Cup
- Seasons: 8 (1994/95–2001/02)
- Individual victories: 42
- Individual podiums: 87
- Overall titles: 6 (1996–97, 1997–98, 1998–99, 1999–00, 2000–01, 2001–02)
- Discipline titles: 16: 4 Individual (1997–98, 1999–00, 2000–01, 2001–02); 5 Sprint (1997–98, 1998–99, 1999–00, 2000–01, 2001–02); 5 Pursuit (1996–97, 1997–98, 1999–00, 2000–01, 2001–02); 2 Mass start (2000–01, 2001–02)
Medal record
Women's biathlon
Representing Sweden
International biathlon competitions
Event	1st	2nd	3rd
Olympic Games	0	0	2
World Championships	6	1	5
Total	6	1	7
Olympic Games
Bronze medal – third place	2002 Salt Lake City	15 km individual
Bronze medal – third place	2002 Salt Lake City	7.5 km sprint
World Championships
Gold medal – first place	1997 Brezno-Osrblie	15 km individual
Gold medal – first place	1997 Brezno-Osrblie	10 km pursuit
Gold medal – first place	1998 Pokljuka	10 km pursuit
Gold medal – first place	2000 Oslo	10 km pursuit
Gold medal – first place	2001 Pokljuka	15 km individual
Gold medal – first place	2001 Pokljuka	12.5 km mass start
Silver medal – second place	1999 Kontiolahti	7.5 km sprint
Bronze medal – third place	1996 Ruhpolding	7.5 km sprint
Bronze medal – third place	1997 Brezno-Osrblie	7.5 km sprint
Bronze medal – third place	1999 Oslo	12.5 km mass start
Bronze medal – third place	2000 Oslo	15 km individual
Bronze medal – third place	2001 Pokljuka	10 km pursuit
Women's cross-country skiing
Representing Sweden
World Championships
Bronze medal – third place	1987 Oberstdorf	4 × 5 km relay
Junior World Championships
Silver medal – second place	1985 Täsch	3 × 5 km relay
Bronze medal – third place	1986 Lake Placid	3 × 5 km relay
Bronze medal – third place	1987 Asiago	15 km

Magdalena "Magda" Forsberg (née Wallin; born 25 July 1967) is a Swedish former cross-country skier and biathlete. She was the dominant female biathlete from 1997 to 2002, when she retired, winning the Biathlon World Cup for six years straight. She is also a six-time world champion, a two-time Olympic bronze medalist, and holds the record for the most World Cup victories in women's biathlon.

She has been married to Henrik Forsberg, also a biathlete and cross-country skier, since mid-1996.

== Cross-country skiing ==
Forsberg competed as a cross country skier from 1988 to 1996, participating in the World Cup. Her best results at the Winter Olympics were in Albertville in 1992 where she finished seventh in the 4 × 5 km relay and 26th in the 15 km event.

Forsberg's best individual finish at the FIS Nordic World Ski Championships was tenth in the 30 km event at Lahti in 1989. In 1987 she was in the Swedish team that finished third in the 4 × 5 km relay. Her best World Cup finish was second in a 10 km event in Finland in 1988.

She participated as a celebrity dancer in Let's Dance 2019, which was broadcast on TV4. She placed second.

== Biathlon ==
Competing from 1993 to 2002, Forsberg won six straight overall wins in the Biathlon World Cup from 1997 to 2002. She also won six gold medals in the World Championships, was runner-up once, and placed third five times. At the 2002 Winter Olympic Games, Forsberg won two bronze medals. In her career she managed a total of 42 individual Biathlon World Cup wins, which is more than any other female biathlete to date.

Magdalena Forsberg retired from active sports after the 2001–02 season. After being retired for four years she made a temporary comeback in April 2006 due to losing a bet. The bet said Forsberg would enter the Swedish Championship in Women's Relay with fellow biathlon skier Anna Carin Olofsson-Zidek if the latter won an Olympic gold in Turin. The duo went on to win the competition, Forsberg outrunning her competitors in the first leg and Olofsson extending their lead in the second.

During large parts of her career, Forsberg was trained by Wolfgang Pichler, who later took over as coach of the Swedish national biathlon team.

== Post-retirement ==
After retirement, Forsberg, along with Peter Forsberg, footballer Mathias Jönsson, and golfer Per-Ulrik Johansson enrolled in a business class at the Johan Cruyff Institute in Stockholm. She received additional education in the field of tax legislation.

== Other honours ==
Forsberg competed at the 1998 Winter Olympics both as a biathlete and as a cross country skier. She is the only Swedish athlete to have been awarded the Jerring Award four times.

== Biathlon results ==
All results are sourced from the International Biathlon Union.

=== Olympic Games ===
2 medals (2 bronze)

Event	Individual	Sprint	Pursuit	Relay
(Japan) 1998 Nagano	14th	17th	—N/a	10th
(United States) 2002 Salt Lake City	Bronze	Bronze	6th	—

*Pursuit was added as an event in 2002.

=== World Championships ===
12 medals (6 gold, 1 silver, 5 bronze)

Event	Individual	Sprint	Pursuit	Mass start	Team	Relay
(Italy) 1995 Antholz-Anterselva	7th	19th	—N/a	—N/a	7th	14th
(Germany) 1996 Ruhpolding	15th	Bronze	—N/a	—N/a	9th	10th
(Slovakia) 1997 Brezno-Osrblie	Gold	Bronze	Gold	—N/a	11th	16th
(Slovenia) 1998 Pokljuka	—N/a	—N/a	Gold	—N/a	7th	—N/a
(Finland) 1999 Kontiolahti	6th	Silver	5th	Bronze	—N/a	—
(Norway) 2000 Oslo Holmenkollen	Bronze	4th	Gold	4th	—N/a	13th
(Slovenia) 2001 Pokljuka	Gold	6th	Bronze	Gold	—N/a	—
(Norway) 2002 Oslo Holmenkollen	—N/a	—N/a	—N/a	8th	—N/a	—N/a

*During Olympic seasons competitions are only held for those events not included in the Olympic program.
**Team was removed as an event in 1998, and pursuit was added in 1997 with mass start being added in 1999.

=== Individual victories ===
42 victories (7 In, 13 Sp, 19 Pu, 3 MS)

Season	Date	Location	Discipline	Level
1994–95; 1 victory (1 Sp)	28 January 1995	(Germany) Ruhpolding	7.5 km sprint	Biathlon World Cup
1995–96; 1 victory (1 In)	14 December 1995	(Norway) Oslo Holmenkollen	15 km individual	Biathlon World Cup
1996–97; 4 victories (1 In, 1 Sp, 2 Pu)	4 January 1997	(Germany) Oberhof	7.5 km sprint	Biathlon World Cup
1996–97; 4 victories (1 In, 1 Sp, 2 Pu)	5 January 1997	(Germany) Oberhof	10 km pursuit	Biathlon World Cup
1996–97; 4 victories (1 In, 1 Sp, 2 Pu)	2 February 1997	(Slovakia) Brezno-Osrblie	10 km pursuit	Biathlon World Championships
1996–97; 4 victories (1 In, 1 Sp, 2 Pu)	7 February 1997	(Slovakia) Brezno-Osrblie	15 km individual	Biathlon World Championships
1997–98; 6 victories (1 In, 3 Sp, 2 Pu)	13 December 1997	(Sweden) Östersund	7.5 km sprint	Biathlon World Cup
1997–98; 6 victories (1 In, 3 Sp, 2 Pu)	20 December 1997	(Finland) Kontiolahti	10 km pursuit	Biathlon World Cup
1997–98; 6 victories (1 In, 3 Sp, 2 Pu)	8 January 1998	(Germany) Ruhpolding	7.5 km sprint	Biathlon World Cup
1997–98; 6 victories (1 In, 3 Sp, 2 Pu)	3 March 1998	(Slovenia) Pokljuka	15 km individual	Biathlon World Cup
1997–98; 6 victories (1 In, 3 Sp, 2 Pu)	7 March 1998	(Slovenia) Pokljuka	7.5 km sprint	Biathlon World Cup
1997–98; 6 victories (1 In, 3 Sp, 2 Pu)	8 March 1998	(Slovenia) Pokljuka	10 km pursuit	Biathlon World Championships
1998–99; 4 victories (2 Sp, 2 Pu)	11 December 1998	(Austria) Hochfilzen	7.5 km sprint	Biathlon World Cup
1998–99; 4 victories (2 Sp, 2 Pu)	12 December 1998	(Austria) Hochfilzen	10 km pursuit	Biathlon World Cup
1998–99; 4 victories (2 Sp, 2 Pu)	25 February 1999	(United States) Lake Placid	7.5 km sprint	Biathlon World Cup
1998–99; 4 victories (2 Sp, 2 Pu)	6 March 1999	(Canada) Valcartier	10 km pursuit	Biathlon World Cup
1999–2000; 3 victories (1 Sp, 2 Pu)	9 December 1999	(Slovenia) Pokljuka	7.5 km sprint	Biathlon World Cup
1999–2000; 3 victories (1 Sp, 2 Pu)	20 February 2000	(Norway) Oslo Holmenkollen	10 km pursuit	Biathlon World Championships
1999–2000; 3 victories (1 Sp, 2 Pu)	18 March 2000	(Russia) Khanty-Mansiysk	10 km pursuit	Biathlon World Cup
2000–01; 14 victories (2 In, 4 Sp, 6 Pu, 2 MS)	8 December 2000	(Italy) Antholz-Anterselva	10 km pursuit	Biathlon World Cup
2000–01; 14 victories (2 In, 4 Sp, 6 Pu, 2 MS)	16 December 2000	(Italy) Antholz-Anterselva	7.5 km sprint	Biathlon World Cup
2000–01; 14 victories (2 In, 4 Sp, 6 Pu, 2 MS)	17 December 2000	(Italy) Antholz-Anterselva	10 km pursuit	Biathlon World Cup
2000–01; 14 victories (2 In, 4 Sp, 6 Pu, 2 MS)	5 January 2001	(Germany) Oberhof	7.5 km sprint	Biathlon World Cup
2000–01; 14 victories (2 In, 4 Sp, 6 Pu, 2 MS)	6 January 2001	(Germany) Oberhof	10 km pursuit	Biathlon World Cup
2000–01; 14 victories (2 In, 4 Sp, 6 Pu, 2 MS)	7 January 2001	(Germany) Oberhof	12.5 km mass start	Biathlon World Cup
2000–01; 14 victories (2 In, 4 Sp, 6 Pu, 2 MS)	13 January 2001	(Germany) Ruhpolding	7.5 km sprint	Biathlon World Cup
2000–01; 14 victories (2 In, 4 Sp, 6 Pu, 2 MS)	14 January 2001	(Germany) Ruhpolding	10 km pursuit	Biathlon World Cup
2000–01; 14 victories (2 In, 4 Sp, 6 Pu, 2 MS)	18 January 2001	(Italy) Antholz-Anterselva	7.5 km sprint	Biathlon World Cup
2000–01; 14 victories (2 In, 4 Sp, 6 Pu, 2 MS)	6 February 2001	(Slovenia) Pokljuka	15 km individual	Biathlon World Championships
2000–01; 14 victories (2 In, 4 Sp, 6 Pu, 2 MS)	9 February 2001	(Slovenia) Pokljuka	12.5 km mass start	Biathlon World Championships
2000–01; 14 victories (2 In, 4 Sp, 6 Pu, 2 MS)	28 February 2001	(United States) Salt Lake City	15 km individual	Biathlon World Cup
2000–01; 14 victories (2 In, 4 Sp, 6 Pu, 2 MS)	3 March 2001	(United States) Salt Lake City	10 km pursuit	Biathlon World Cup
2000–01; 14 victories (2 In, 4 Sp, 6 Pu, 2 MS)	17 March 2001	(Norway) Oslo Holmenkollen	10 km pursuit	Biathlon World Cup
2001–02; 9 victories (2 In, 1 Sp, 5 Pu, 1 MS)	6 December 2001	(Austria) Hochfilzen	7.5 km sprint	Biathlon World Cup
2001–02; 9 victories (2 In, 1 Sp, 5 Pu, 1 MS)	9 December 2001	(Austria) Hochfilzen	10 km pursuit	Biathlon World Cup
2001–02; 9 victories (2 In, 1 Sp, 5 Pu, 1 MS)	12 December 2001	(Slovenia) Pokljuka	15 km individual	Biathlon World Cup
2001–02; 9 victories (2 In, 1 Sp, 5 Pu, 1 MS)	16 December 2001	(Slovenia) Pokljuka	10 km pursuit	Biathlon World Cup
2001–02; 9 victories (2 In, 1 Sp, 5 Pu, 1 MS)	20 December 2001	(Slovakia) Brezno-Osrblie	15 km individual	Biathlon World Cup
2001–02; 9 victories (2 In, 1 Sp, 5 Pu, 1 MS)	22 December 2001	(Slovakia) Brezno-Osrblie	12.5 km mass start	Biathlon World Cup
2001–02; 9 victories (2 In, 1 Sp, 5 Pu, 1 MS)	11 January 2002	(Germany) Oberhof	10 km pursuit	Biathlon World Cup
2001–02; 9 victories (2 In, 1 Sp, 5 Pu, 1 MS)	10 March 2002	(Sweden) Östersund	10 km pursuit	Biathlon World Cup
2001–02; 9 victories (2 In, 1 Sp, 5 Pu, 1 MS)	23 March 2002	(Norway) Oslo Holmenkollen	10 km pursuit	Biathlon World Cup

*Results are from UIPMB and IBU races which include the Biathlon World Cup, Biathlon World Championships and the Winter Olympic Games.

== Cross-country skiing results ==
Magdalena Forsberg
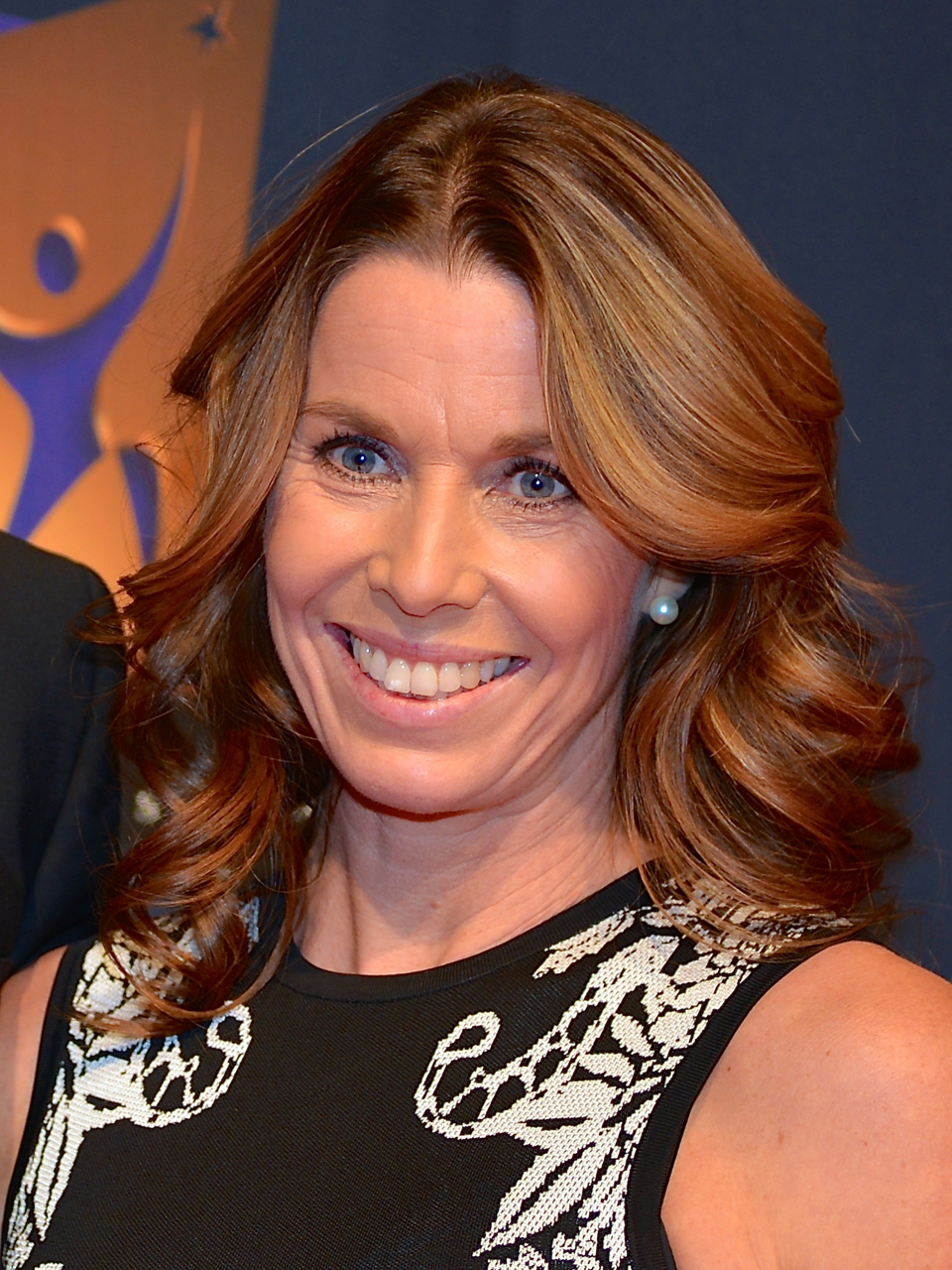
- Magdalena Forsberg during the Swedish Sports Gala in the Stockholm Globe Arena in Januari 2014

Sport
- Sport: Skiing

World Cup career
- Seasons: 7 – (1988–1994)
- Indiv. starts: 31
- Indiv. podiums: 1
- Indiv. wins: 0
- Team starts: 5
- Team podiums: 2
- Team wins: 0
- Overall titles: 0 – (17th in 1989)

All results are sourced from the International Ski Federation (FIS).

=== Olympic Games ===
Year	Age	5 km	15 km	Pursuit	30 km	4 × 5 km relay
1992	24	—	26	—	34	7
1998	30	—	—	—	—	8

=== World Championships ===
- 1 medal – (1 bronze)

Year	Age	5 km	10 km classical	10 km freestyle	15 km	20 km	30 km	4 × 5 km relay
1987	19	—	—	—N/a	—N/a	—	—N/a	Bronze
1989	21	—N/a	18	—	17	—N/a	10	4
1991	23	27	—N/a	—	25	—N/a	—	6

=== World Cup ===
==== Season standings ====
Season	Age	Overall
1988	20	20
1989	21	17
1990	22	21
1991	23	29
1992	24	NC
1993	25	55
1994	26	NC

==== Individual podiums ====
- 1 podium

No.	Season	Date	Location	Race	Level	Place
1	1987–88	27 March 1988	Rovaniemi, Finland	10 km Individual F	World Cup	2nd

==== Team podiums ====
- 2 podiums

No.	Season	Date	Location	Race	Level	Place	Teammates
1	1986–87	17 February 1987	Oberstdorf, West Germany	4 × 5 km Relay F	World Championships^{[1]}	3rd	Lamberg-Skog / Dahlman / Westin
2	1988–89	12 March 1989	Falun, Sweden	4 × 5 km Relay C	World Cup	3rd	Svingstedt / Lamberg-Skog / Fritzon

Note: ^{1} Until the 1999 World Championships, World Championship races were included in the World Cup scoring system.
