= 1998–99 Biathlon World Cup =

Biathlon competition

1998–99 World Cup
Discipline	Men	Women
Overall	(Germany) Sven Fischer	(Sweden) Magdalena Forsberg
Nations Cup	Germany	Germany
Individual	(Russia) Pavel Rostovtsev	(Germany) Uschi Disl
Sprint	(Germany) Sven Fischer	(Sweden) Magdalena Forsberg
Pursuit	(France) Raphaël Poirée	(Ukraine) Olena Zubrilova
Mass start	(Germany) Sven Fischer	(Ukraine) Olena Zubrilova
Relay	Germany	Germany

Competition

The 1998–99 Biathlon World Cup was a multi-race tournament over a season of biathlon, organised by the International Biathlon Union. The season started on 11 December 1998 in Hochfilzen, Austria, and ended on 14 March 1999 in Holmenkollen, Norway. It was the 22nd season of the Biathlon World Cup.

== Calendar ==
Below is the IBU World Cup calendar for the 1998–99 season.

Location	Date	Individual	Sprint	Pursuit	Mass start	Relay
(Austria) Hochfilzen	11–13 December	●	●	●		
(Slovakia) Osrblie	16–20 December	●	●	●		●
(Germany) Oberhof	8–10 January		●	●		●
(Germany) Ruhpolding	13–17 January		●	●	●	●
(Italy) Antholz	22–24 January		●	●		●
(Finland) Kontiolahti	12–14 February		●	●		●
(United States) Lake Placid	26–28 February		●	●		●
(Canada) Valcartier	4–6 March		●	●		
(Norway) Holmenkollen	11–14 March	●	●	●	●	
Total		3	9	9	2	6

== World Cup Podium ==
=== Men ===
Stage	Date	Place	Discipline	Winner	Second	Third	Yellow bib (After competition)	Det.
1	11 December 1998	(Austria) Hochfilzen	10 km Sprint	(Norway) Ole Einar Bjørndalen	(France) Raphaël Poirée	(Russia) Pavel Rostovtsev	(Norway) Ole Einar Bjørndalen	Detail
1	12 December 1998	(Austria) Hochfilzen	12.5 km Pursuit	(France) Raphaël Poirée	(Norway) Ole Einar Bjørndalen	(Germany) Sven Fischer	(Norway) Ole Einar Bjørndalen	Detail
1	13 December 1998	(Austria) Hochfilzen	20 km Individual	(Belarus) Oleg Ryzhenkov	(Norway) Ole Einar Bjørndalen	(Czech Republic) Ivan Masařík	(Norway) Ole Einar Bjørndalen	Detail
2	16 December 1998	(Slovakia) Brezno-Osrblie	20 km Individual	(Russia) Pavel Rostovtsev	(Finland) Vesa Hietalahti	(Italy) René Cattarinussi	(Russia) Pavel Rostovtsev	Detail
2	19 December 1998	(Slovakia) Brezno-Osrblie	10 km Sprint	(Germany) Sven Fischer	(Latvia) Oļegs Maļuhins	(France) Raphaël Poirée	(Germany) Sven Fischer	Detail
2	20 December 1998	(Slovakia) Brezno-Osrblie	12.5 km Pursuit	(Germany) Sven Fischer	(France) Raphaël Poirée	(Russia) Pavel Rostovtsev	(Germany) Sven Fischer	Detail
3	8 January 1999	(Germany) Oberhof	10 km Sprint	(Russia) Vladimir Drachev	(Norway) Ole Einar Bjørndalen	(Germany) Ricco Groß	(Russia) Pavel Rostovtsev	Detail
3	9 January 1999	(Germany) Oberhof	12.5 km Pursuit	(Norway) Ole Einar Bjørndalen	(Germany) Ricco Groß	(Germany) Frank Luck	(Norway) Ole Einar Bjørndalen	Detail
4	13 January 1999	(Germany) Ruhpolding	15 km Mass Start	(France) Raphaël Poirée	(Germany) Frank Luck	(Russia) Sergei Rozhkov	(Norway) Ole Einar Bjørndalen	Detail
4	16 January 1999	(Germany) Ruhpolding	10 km Sprint	(Belarus) Alexei Aidarov	(Norway) Sylfest Glimsdal	(Sweden) Fredrik Kuoppa	(Germany) Sven Fischer	Detail
4	17 January 1999	(Germany) Ruhpolding	12.5 km Pursuit	(France) Raphaël Poirée	(Germany) Ricco Groß	(Germany) Sven Fischer	(Germany) Sven Fischer	Detail
5	22 January 1999	(Italy) Antholz-Anterselva	10 km Sprint	(Italy) René Cattarinussi	(Germany) Frank Luck	(Germany) Ricco Groß	(Germany) Frank Luck	Detail
5	23 January 1999	(Italy) Antholz-Anterselva	12.5 km Pursuit	(Norway) Ole Einar Bjørndalen	(Germany) Carsten Heymann	(Norway) Halvard Hanevold	(Norway) Ole Einar Bjørndalen	Detail
WC	12 February 1999	(Finland) Kontiolahti	10 km Sprint	(Germany) Frank Luck	(Italy) Patrick Favre	(Norway) Frode Andresen	(Germany) Frank Luck	Detail
WC	13 February 1999	(Finland) Kontiolahti	12.5 km Pursuit	(Germany) Ricco Groß	(Germany) Frank Luck	(Germany) Sven Fischer	(Germany) Frank Luck	Detail
6	26 February 1999	(United States) Lake Placid	10 km Sprint	(Germany) Sven Fischer	(Italy) René Cattarinussi	(Germany) Jan Wüstenfeld	(Germany) Frank Luck	Detail
6	27 February 1999	(United States) Lake Placid	12.5 km Pursuit	(France) Raphaël Poirée	(Germany) Peter Sendel	(Germany) Sven Fischer	(Germany) Frank Luck	Detail
7	4 March 1999	(Canada) Val Cartier	10 km Sprint	(Latvia) Oļegs Maļuhins	(Norway) Ole Einar Bjørndalen	(Norway) Frode Andresen	(Germany) Frank Luck	Detail
7	6 March 1999	(Canada) Val Cartier	12.5 km Pursuit	(Norway) Frode Andresen	(Norway) Halvard Hanevold	(Germany) Sven Fischer	(Germany) Sven Fischer	Detail
WC	11 March 1999	(Norway) Oslo Holmenkollen	20 km Individual	(Germany) Sven Fischer	(Germany) Ricco Groß	(Belarus) Vadim Sashurin	(Germany) Sven Fischer	Detail
8	12 March 1999	(Norway) Oslo Holmenkollen	10 km Sprint	(Norway) Halvard Hanevold (Germany) Sven Fischer		(Ukraine) Andriy Deryzemlya	(Germany) Sven Fischer	Detail
WC	13 March 1999	(Norway) Oslo Holmenkollen	15 km Mass Start	(Germany) Sven Fischer	(Russia) Vladimir Drachev	(Norway) Ole Einar Bjørndalen	(Germany) Sven Fischer	Detail
8	14 March 1999	(Norway) Oslo Holmenkollen	12.5 km Pursuit	(Germany) Frank Luck	(France) Raphaël Poirée	(Germany) Ricco Groß	(Germany) Sven Fischer	Detail

=== Women ===
Stage	Date	Place	Discipline	Winner	Second	Third	Yellow bib (After competition)	Det.
1	11 December 1998	(Austria) Hochfilzen	7.5 km Sprint	(Sweden) Magdalena Forsberg	(France) Corinne Niogret	(Russia) Galina Koukleva	(Sweden) Magdalena Forsberg	Detail
1	12 December 1998	(Austria) Hochfilzen	10 km Pursuit	(Sweden) Magdalena Forsberg	(France) Corinne Niogret	(Germany) Simone Greiner-Petter-M.	(Sweden) Magdalena Forsberg	Detail
1	13 December 1998	(Austria) Hochfilzen	15 km Individual	(Germany) Uschi Disl	(Sweden) Magdalena Forsberg	(France) Corinne Niogret	(Sweden) Magdalena Forsberg	Detail
2	16 December 1998	(Slovakia) Brezno-Osrblie	15 km Individual	(Germany) Uschi Disl	(Russia) Albina Akhatova	(Sweden) Magdalena Forsberg	(Sweden) Magdalena Forsberg	Detail
2	19 December 1998	(Slovakia) Brezno-Osrblie	7.5 km Sprint	(Germany) Simone Greiner-Petter-M.	(Germany) Uschi Disl	(Norway) Liv Grete Skjelbreid	(Sweden) Magdalena Forsberg	Detail
2	20 December 1998	(Slovakia) Brezno-Osrblie	10 km Pursuit	(Germany) Uschi Disl	(Germany) Simone Greiner-Petter-M.	(Germany) Katrin Apel	(Sweden) Magdalena Forsberg	Detail
3	8 January 1999	(Germany) Oberhof	7.5 km Sprint	(Norway) Liv Grete Skjelbreid	(Ukraine) Olena Zubrilova	(Russia) Nadezhda Talanova	(Sweden) Magdalena Forsberg	Detail
3	9 January 1999	(Germany) Oberhof	10 km Pursuit	(Norway) Liv Grete Skjelbreid	(Ukraine) Olena Zubrilova	(Sweden) Magdalena Forsberg	(Sweden) Magdalena Forsberg	Detail
4	13 January 1999	(Germany) Ruhpolding	12.5 km Mass Start	(Germany) Uschi Disl	(Ukraine) Olena Zubrilova	(France) Corinne Niogret	(Sweden) Magdalena Forsberg	Detail
4	16 January 1999	(Germany) Ruhpolding	7.5 km Sprint	(Ukraine) Olena Zubrilova	(France) Corinne Niogret	(Norway) Gro Marit Istad	(Sweden) Magdalena Forsberg	Detail
4	17 January 1999	(Germany) Ruhpolding	10 km Pursuit	(Ukraine) Olena Zubrilova	(France) Corinne Niogret	(Sweden) Magdalena Forsberg	(Sweden) Magdalena Forsberg	Detail
5	22 January 1999	(Italy) Antholz-Anterselva	7.5 km Sprint	(France) Corinne Niogret	(Sweden) Magdalena Forsberg	(Ukraine) Olena Petrova	(Sweden) Magdalena Forsberg	Detail
5	23 January 1999	(Italy) Antholz-Anterselva	10 km Pursuit	(France) Corinne Niogret	(Sweden) Magdalena Forsberg	(Ukraine) Olena Petrova	(Sweden) Magdalena Forsberg	Detail
WC	12 February 1999	(Finland) Kontiolahti	7.5 km Sprint	(Germany) Martina Zellner	(Sweden) Magdalena Forsberg	(Ukraine) Olena Zubrilova	(Sweden) Magdalena Forsberg	Detail
WC	13 February 1999	(Finland) Kontiolahti	10 km Pursuit	(Ukraine) Olena Zubrilova	(Slovakia) Martina Schwarzbacherová	(Germany) Martina Zellner	(Sweden) Magdalena Forsberg	Detail
6	25 February 1999	(United States) Lake Placid	7.5 km Sprint	(Sweden) Magdalena Forsberg	(Ukraine) Olena Zubrilova	(Slovakia) Martina Schwarzbacherová	(Sweden) Magdalena Forsberg	Detail
6	27 February 1999	(United States) Lake Placid	10 km Pursuit	(Ukraine) Olena Zubrilova	(Sweden) Magdalena Forsberg	(Germany) Uschi Disl	(Sweden) Magdalena Forsberg	Detail
7	5 March 1999	(Canada) Val Cartier	7.5 km Sprint	(Norway) Liv Grete Skjelbreid	(Germany) Katrin Apel	(Sweden) Magdalena Forsberg	(Sweden) Magdalena Forsberg	Detail
7	6 March 1999	(Canada) Val Cartier	10 km Pursuit	(Sweden) Magdalena Forsberg	(Ukraine) Olena Zubrilova	(Slovakia) Martina Schwarzbacherová	(Sweden) Magdalena Forsberg	Detail
WC	11 March 1999	(Norway) Oslo Holmenkollen	15 km Individual	(Ukraine) Olena Zubrilova	(France) Corinne Niogret	(Russia) Albina Akhatova	(Sweden) Magdalena Forsberg	Detail
8	12 March 1999	(Norway) Oslo Holmenkollen	7.5 km Sprint	(Ukraine) Olena Zubrilova	(Norway) Ann-Elen Skjelbreid	(Ukraine) Olena Petrova	(Sweden) Magdalena Forsberg	Detail
WC	13 March 1999	(Norway) Oslo Holmenkollen	12.5 km Mass Start	(Ukraine) Olena Zubrilova	(Ukraine) Olena Petrova	(Sweden) Magdalena Forsberg	(Sweden) Magdalena Forsberg	Detail
8	14 March 1999	(Norway) Oslo Holmenkollen	10 km Pursuit	(Ukraine) Olena Zubrilova	(Norway) Ann-Elen Skjelbreid	(Ukraine) Olena Petrova	(Sweden) Magdalena Forsberg	Detail

=== Men's team ===
Event	Date	Place	Discipline	Winner	Second	Third
2	18 December 1998	(Slovakia) Osrblie	4x7.5 km Relay	Germany Ricco Gross; Peter Sendel; Sven Fischer; Frank Luck	Belarus Alexei Aidarov; Ivan Pesterev; Vadim Sashurin; Oleg Ryzhenkov	Norway Halvard Hanevold; Egil Gjelland; Dag Bjørndalen; Ole Einar Bjørndalen
3	10 January 1999	(Germany) Oberhof	4x7.5 km Relay	Germany Ricco Gross; Peter Sendel; Sven Fischer; Frank Luck	Russia Sergei Rozhkov; Vladimir Drachev; Vyacheslav Kunayev; Viktor Maigourov	Norway Egil Gjelland; Sylfest Glimsdal; Frode Andresen; Halvard Hanevold
4	14 January 1999	(Germany) Ruhpolding	4x7.5 km Relay	Germany Ricco Gross; Peter Sendel; Sven Fischer; Frank Luck	Russia Viktor Maigourov; Vladimir Drachev; Sergei Rozhkov; Pavel Rostovtsev	Finland Ville Raikkonen; Vesa Hietalahti; Mikko Uusipaikka; Paavo Puurunen
5	24 January 1999	(Italy) Antholz-Anterselva	4x7.5 km Relay	Germany Ricco Gross; Peter Sendel; Sven Fischer; Frank Luck	Italy Rene Cattarinussi; Patrick Favre; Wilfried Pallhuber; Pieralberto Carrara	Norway Halvard Hanevold; Dag Bjørndalen; Egil Gjelland; Ole Einar Bjørndalen
WC	14 February 1999	(Finland) Kontiolahti	4x7.5 km Relay	Belarus Alexei Aidarov; Petr Ivashko; Vadim Sashurin; Oleg Ryzhenkov	Russia Viktor Maigourov; Vladimir Drachev; Sergei Rozhkov; Pavel Rostovtsev	Norway Halvard Hanevold; Dag Bjørndalen; Frode Andresen; Ole Einar Bjørndalen
6	28 February 1999	(United States) Lake Placid	4x7.5 km Relay	Russia Viktor Maigourov; Vladimir Drachev; Sergei Rozhkov; Pavel Rostovtsev	Germany Frank Luck; Ricco Gross; Peter Sendel; Sven Fischer	Norway Frode Andresen; Dag Bjørndalen; Sylfest Glimsdal; Halvard Hanevold

=== Women's team ===
Event	Date	Place	Discipline	Winner	Second	Third
2	18 December 1998	(Slovakia) Osrblie	4x7.5 km Relay	Germany Uschi Disl; Simone Greiner; Katrin Apel; Martina Zellner	Belarus Irina Tananayko; Svetlana Paramygina; Nataliya Moroz; Natalia Ryzhenkova	Russia Anna Volkova; Galina Kukleva; Olga Romasko; Albina Akhatova
3	10 January 1999	(Germany) Oberhof	4x7.5 km Relay	Germany Uschi Disl; Simone Greiner; Andrea Henkel; Martina Zellner	Russia Anna Volkova; Olga Romasko; Albina Akhatova; Nadezhda Talanova	France Delphyne Burlet; Emmanuelle Claret; Anne Briand; Corinne Niogret
4	14 January 1999	(Germany) Ruhpolding	4x7.5 km Relay	Ukraine Olena Zubrilova; Olena Petrova; Nina Lemesh; Tetyana Vodopyanova	Germany Uschi Disl; Katrin Apel; Simone Greiner; Martina Zellner	Russia Anna Volkova; Nadezhda Talanova; Svetlana Ishmouratova; Olga Romasko
5	24 January 1999	(Italy) Antholz-Anterselva	4x7.5 km Relay	Russia Albina Akhatova; Anna Volkova; Svetlana Ishmouratova; Galina Kukleva	Germany Uschi Disl; Katrin Apel; Andrea Henkel; Katja Beer	France Florence Baverel; Christelle Gros; Emmanuelle Claret; Corinne Niogret
WC	14 February 1999	(Finland) Kontiolahti	4x7.5 km Relay	Germany Uschi Disl; Simone Greiner; Katrin Apel; Martina Zellner	Russia Nadezhda Talanova; Galina Kukleva; Olga Romasko; Albina Akhatova	France Delphyne Burlet; Florence Baverel; Christelle Gros; Corinne Niogret
6	28 February 1999	(United States) Lake Placid	4x7.5 km Relay	Norway Ann-Elen Skjelbreid; Gro Marit Istad; Liv Grete Skjelbreid; Gunn Margit Andreassen	Ukraine Tetyana Rud; Olena Petrova; Oksana Khvostenko; Olena Zubrilova	Finland Katja Holanti; Outi Kettunen; Annukka Mallat; Eija Salonen

== Standings: Men ==
=== Overall ===
Pos.		Points
1.	(Germany) Sven Fischer	443
2.	(Norway) Ole Einar Bjørndalen	397
3.	(Germany) Frank Luck	390
4.	(Germany) Ricco Groß	367
5.	(France) Raphaël Poirée	365

- Final standings after 23 races.

=== Individual ===
Pos.		Points
1.	(Russia) Pavel Rostovtsev	62
2.	(Germany) Sven Fischer	62
3.	(Belarus) Oleg Ryzhenkov	61
4.	(Norway) Ole Einar Bjørndalen	48
5.	(Finland) Vesa Hietalahti	43

- Final standings after 3 races.

=== Sprint ===
Pos.		Points
1.	(Germany) Sven Fischer	170
2.	(Germany) Frank Luck	161
3.	(Norway) Halvard Hanevold	151
4.	(Germany) Ricco Groß	137
5.	(Norway) Frode Andresen	133

- Final standings after 9 races.

=== Pursuit ===
Pos.		Points
1.	(France) Raphaël Poirée	185
2.	(Germany) Sven Fischer	184
3.	(Norway) Ole Einar Bjørndalen	174
4.	(Germany) Frank Luck	174
5.	(Germany) Ricco Groß	168

- Final standings after 9 races.

=== Mass Start ===
Pos.		Points
1.	(Germany) Sven Fischer	48
2.	(France) Raphaël Poirée	47
3.	(Norway) Ole Einar Bjørndalen	45
4.	(Russia) Vladimir Drachev	41
5.	(Germany) Ricco Groß	38

- Final standings after 2 races.

=== Relay ===
Pos.		Points
1.	Germany	146
2.	Russia	129
3.	Norway	120
4.	Belarus	115
5.	Finland	104

- Final standings after 6 races.

=== Nation ===
Pos.		Points
1.	Germany	3626
2.	Norway	3505
3.	Russia	3474
4.	Belarus	3361
5.	Italy	3237

- Final standings after 18 races.

== Standings: Women ==
=== Overall ===
Pos.		Points
1.	(Sweden) Magdalena Forsberg	478
2.	(Ukraine) Olena Zubrilova	467
3.	(Germany) Uschi Disl	420
4.	(France) Corinne Niogret	375
5.	(Norway) Liv Grete Skjelbreid	313

- Final standings after 23 races.

=== Individual ===
Pos.		Points
1.	(Germany) Uschi Disl	77
2.	(Sweden) Magdalena Forsberg	70
3.	(Russia) Albina Akhatova	50
4.	(France) Corinne Niogret	50
5.	(Germany) Martina Zellner	43

- Final standings after 3 races.

=== Sprint ===
Pos.		Points
1.	(Sweden) Magdalena Forsberg	193
2.	(Ukraine) Olena Zubrilova	180
3.	(Norway) Liv Grete Skjelbreid	157
4.	(France) Corinne Niogret	148
5.	(Germany) Uschi Disl	134

- Final standings after 9 races.

=== Pursuit ===
Pos.		Points
1.	(Ukraine) Olena Zubrilova	208
2.	(Sweden) Magdalena Forsberg	203
3.	(Germany) Uschi Disl	171
4.	(France) Corinne Niogret	146
5.	(Ukraine) Olena Petrova	129

- Final standings after 9 races.

=== Mass Start ===
Pos.		Points
1.	(Ukraine) Olena Zubrilova	56
2.	(Germany) Uschi Disl	49
3.	(Sweden) Magdalena Forsberg	45
4.	(Germany) Katrin Apel	32
5.	(France) Corinne Niogret	31

- Final standings after 2 races.

=== Relay ===
Pos.		Points
1.	Germany	142
2.	Russia	130
3.	Ukraine	120
4.	France	114
5.	Norway	110

- Final standings after 6 races.

=== Nation ===
Pos.		Points
1.	Germany	3568
2.	Russia	3439
3.	Ukraine	3402
4.	Norway	3364
5.	France	3297

- Final standings after 18 races.

== Medal table ==
Rank	Nation	Gold	Silver	Bronze	Total
1	Germany	22	14	14	50
2	Norway	9	8	11	28
3	Ukraine	9	7	6	22
4	France	6	8	6	20
5	Russia	4	7	8	19
6	Sweden	4	5	6	15
7	Belarus	3	2	1	6
8	Italy	1	3	1	5
9	Latvia	1	1	0	2
10	Finland	0	1	2	3
10	Slovakia	0	1	2	3
12	Czech Republic	0	0	1	1
Totals (12 entries)		59	57	58	174

== Achievements ==
Victory in this World Cup (all-time number of victories in parentheses)

Men

- Sven Fischer (GER), 6 (15) first places
- Raphaël Poirée (FRA), 4 (5) first places
- Ole Einar Bjørndalen (NOR), 3 (9) first places
- Frank Luck (GER), 2 (8) first places
- Vladimir Drachev (RUS), 1 (11) first place
- Ricco Groß (GER), 1 (4) first places
- Oleg Ryzhenkov (BLR), 1 (3) first place
- Halvard Hanevold (NOR), 1 (3) first place
- Alexei Aidarov (BLR), 1 (2) first place
- Frode Andresen (NOR), 1 (2) first place
- Pavel Rostovtsev (RUS), 1 (1) first place
- René Cattarinussi (ITA), 1 (1) first place
- Oļegs Maļuhins (LAT), 1 (1) first place

Women

- Olena Zubrilova (UKR), 8 (8) first places
- Uschi Disl (GER), 4 (18) first places
- Magdalena Forsberg (SWE), 4 (16) first places
- Liv Grete Skjelbreid (NOR), 3 (3) first places
- Corinne Niogret (FRA), 2 (4) first places
- Simone Greiner (GER), 1 (4) first place
- Martina Zellner (GER), 1 (1) first place

== Retirements ==
The following notable biathletes retired after the 1998–99 season:

- Mark Kirchner (GER)
- Fredrik Kuoppa (SWE)
- Mari Lampinen (FIN)
- Anne Briand (FRA)
- Kathi Schwaab (GER)
- Annette Sikveland (NOR)
- Nadezhda Talanova (RUS)
