= Uwe Wünsch =

East German cross-country skier (born 1963)

Personal information
- Nationality: Germany
- Born: 11 February 1963 (age 63) Frankenberg, Saxony, East Germany

Sport
- Sport: Skiing
- Club: SC Traktor Oberwiesenthal

World Cup career
- Seasons: 2 – (1983–1984)
- Indiv. starts: 4
- Indiv. podiums: 0
- Team starts: 2
- Team podiums: 1
- Team wins: 0
- Overall titles: 0 – (48th in 1983)
Medal record
Representing East Germany
Men's cross-country skiing
World Championships
Bronze medal – third place	1982 Oslo	4 × 10 km relay
Junior World Championships
Bronze medal – third place	1983 Kuopio	3 × 5 km relay

Uwe Wünsch (born 15 February 1963 in Frankenberg, Saxony) is an East German cross-country skier who competed in the early 1980s. He won a bronze medal in the 4 × 10 km relay at the 1982 FIS Nordic World Ski Championships (Tied with Finland).

Winsch finished 12th in the 15 km event at a 1983 World Cup event in Sarajevo. He also competed at the 1984 Winter Olympics.

== Cross-country skiing results ==
All results are sourced from the International Ski Federation (FIS).

=== Olympic Games ===
Year	Age	15 km	30 km	50 km	4 × 10 km relay
1984	21	23	25	43	9

=== World Championships ===
- 1 medal – (1 bronze)

Year	Age	15 km	30 km	50 km	4 × 10 km relay
1982	19	49	—	—	Bronze

=== World Cup ===
==== Season standings ====
Season	Age	Overall
1983	20	48
1984	21	NC

==== Team podiums ====
- 1 podium

No.	Season	Date	Location	Race	Level	Place	Teammate(s)
1	1981–82	25 February 1982	Oslo, Norway	4 × 10 km Relay	World Championships^{[1]}	3rd	Bellmann / Schicker / Schröder

Note: ^{1} Until the 1999 World Championships, World Championship races were included in the World Cup scoring system.
