= Veronika Schmidt =

East German cross-country skier (born 1952)

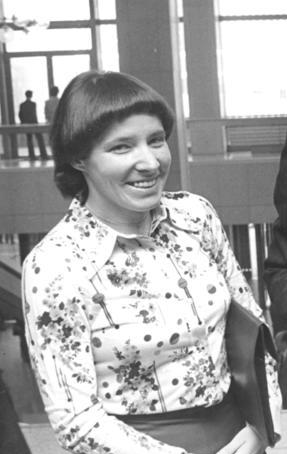
- Schmidt in 1981

Personal information
- Nationality: Germany
- Born: 24 August 1952 (age 73) Harzgerode, East Germany

Sport
- Sport: Skiing

World Cup career
- Seasons: 1 – (1982)
- Indiv. starts: 4
- Indiv. podiums: 0
- Team starts: 1
- Team podiums: 1
- Team wins: 0
- Overall titles: 0 – (27th in 1982)
Medal record
Women's cross-country skiing
Representing East Germany
Olympic Games
Gold medal – first place	1980 Lake Placid	4 × 5 km relay
Bronze medal – third place	1976 Innsbruck	4 × 5 km relay
World Championships
Gold medal – first place	1980 Falun	20 km
Silver medal – second place	1974 Falun	4 × 5 km relay
Bronze medal – third place	1982 Oslo	4 × 5 km relay

Veronika Hesse (née Schmidt; born 24 August 1952 in Harzgerode) is a former East German cross-country skier who competed from 1974 to 1982. She won two 4 × 5 km relay medals at the Winter Olympics with a gold in Lake Placid and a bronze in Innsbruck.

Schmidt also won a complete set medals at the FIS Nordic World Ski Championships with a gold in the 20 km (1980), a silver in the 4 × 5 km relay (1974), and a bronze in the 4 × 5 km relay (1982).

== Cross-country skiing results ==
All results are sourced from the International Ski Federation (FIS).

=== Olympic Games ===
- 2 medals – (1 gold, 1 bronze)

Year	Age	5 km	10 km	4 × 5 km relay
1976	23	12	8	Bronze
1980	27	7	8	Gold

=== World Championships ===
- 3 medals – (1 gold, 1 silver, 1 bronze)

Year	Age	5 km	10 km	20 km	4 × 5 km relay
1974	21	—	5	—N/a	Silver
1978	25	—	20	8	—
1980	27	—N/a	—N/a	Gold	—N/a
1982	29	14	20	9	Bronze

=== World Cup ===
==== Season standings ====
Season	Age	Overall
1982	30	27

==== Team podiums ====
- 1 podium

No.	Season	Date	Location	Race	Level	Place	Teammates
1	1981–82	24 February 1982	Oslo, Norway	4 × 5 km Relay	World Championships^{[1]}	3rd	Sölter / Anding / Petzold

Note: ^{1} Until the 1999 World Championships, World Championship races were included in the World Cup scoring system.
