= Beth Paxson =

American skier (born 1960)

Personal information
- Born: February 10, 1960 (age 65) Burlington, Vermont, United States

Sport
- Sport: Cross-country skiing

Beth Paxson (born February 10, 1960) is an American cross-country skier. She competed in three events at the 1980 Winter Olympics. Paxson also skied at the University of Vermont, where she is a 1984 graduate.

== Cross-country skiing results ==
=== Olympic Games ===
Year	Age	5 km	10 km	4 × 5 km relay
1980	20	26	25	7

=== World Championships ===
Year	Age	5 km	10 km	20 km	4 × 5 km relay
1978	18	27	29	—	8
