= Uwe Bellmann =

German cross-country skier (born 1962)

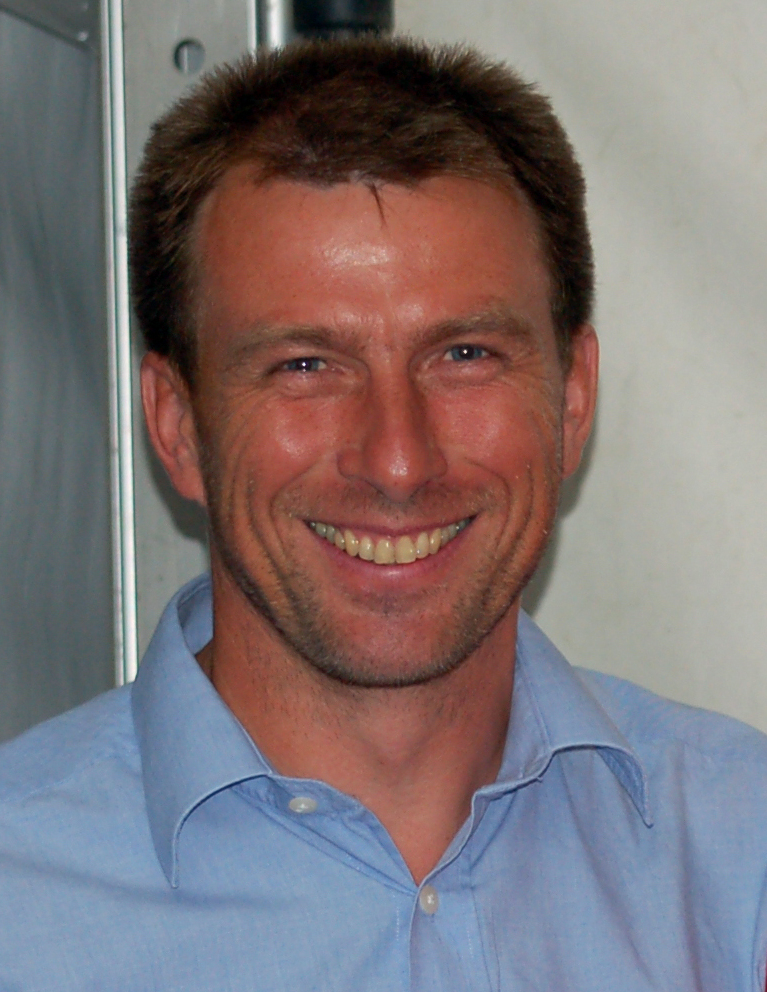
- Uwe Bellmann in 2007

Personal information
- Nationality: Germany
- Born: 8 October 1962 (age 63) Freiberg, East Germany

Sport
- Sport: Skiing
- Club: BSG Einheit Sayda; SC Traktor Oberwiesenthal; SC Monte Kaolino Hirschau

World Cup career
- Seasons: 1982–1985, 1987–1998
- Indiv. starts: 65
- Indiv. podiums: 1
- Indiv. wins: 0
- Team starts: 13
- Team podiums: 1
- Team wins: 0
- Overall titles: 0 – (9th in 1989)
- Discipline titles: 0
Medal record
Representing East Germany
Men's cross-country skiing
World Championships
Bronze medal – third place	1982 Oslo	4 × 10 km relay
Junior World Championships
Bronze medal – third place	1981 Schonach	3 × 5 km relay

Uwe Bellmann (born 8 October 1962) is an East German/German cross-country skier who competed from 1982 to 1997. He won a bronze medal in the 4 × 10 km relay at the 1982 FIS Nordic World Ski Championships (Tied with Finland).

Bellman's best individual finish at the World Championships was fifth in the 30 km event at Lahti in 1989. He also competed at the Winter Olympics in 1984 and 1988 where his best finish was fifth in the 15 km event in Calgary.

Bellman won two individual Continental Cup competitions at 15 km in 1993 and 1995.

== Cross-country skiing results ==
All results are sourced from the International Ski Federation (FIS).

=== Olympic Games ===
Year	Age	15 km	30 km	50 km	4 × 10 km relay
1984	21	7	10	DNF	9
1988	25	5	15	8	—

=== World Championships ===
- 1 medal – (1 bronze)

Year	Age	10 km	15 km classical	15 km freestyle	Pursuit	30 km	50 km	4 × 10 km relay
1982	19	—N/a	—	—N/a	—N/a	20	—	Bronze
1985	22	—N/a	—N/a	34	—N/a	—	10	—
1987	24	—N/a	—	—N/a	—N/a	—	12	10
1989	26	—N/a	31	—	—N/a	5	36	6
1995	32	11	—N/a	—N/a	48	12	—	7
1997	34	18	—N/a	—N/a	DNF	—	DNF	6

=== World Cup ===
==== Season standings ====
Season	Age			
Season	Age	Overall	Long Distance	Sprint
1982	19	39	—N/a	—N/a
1983	20	34	—N/a	—N/a
1984	21	29	—N/a	—N/a
1985	22	21	—N/a	—N/a
1987	24	18	—N/a	—N/a
1988	25	11	—N/a	—N/a
1989	26	9	—N/a	—N/a
1990	27	13	—N/a	—N/a
1991	28	NC	—N/a	—N/a
1992	29	NC	—N/a	—N/a
1993	30	NC	—N/a	—N/a
1994	31	NC	—N/a	—N/a
1995	32	32	—N/a	—N/a
1996	33	75	—N/a	—N/a
1997	34	65	61	—
1998	35	104	NC	81

==== Individual podiums ====
- 1 podium

No.	Season	Date	Location	Race	Level	Place
1	1988–89	10 December 1988	Ramsau, Austria	15 km Individual F	World Cup	3rd

==== Team podiums ====
- 1 podium

No.	Season	Date	Location	Race	Level	Place	Teammates
1	1981–82	25 February 1982	Oslo, Norway	4 × 10 km Relay	World Championships^{[1]}	3rd	Wünsch / Schicker / Schröder

Note: ^{1} Until the 1999 World Championships, World Championship races were included in the World Cup scoring system.
