= Anna-Lena Fritzon =

Anna-Lena Fritzson
Personal information
- Full name: Anna-Lena Katarina Fritzson
- Nationality: Sweden
- Born: 7 March 1965 Falun, Sweden

Sport
- Sport: Skiing

World Cup career
- Seasons: 7 – (1985–1986, 1988–1990, 1993–1994)
- Indiv. starts: 26
- Indiv. podiums: 2
- Indiv. wins: 0
- Team starts: 7
- Team podiums: 3
- Team wins: 0
- Overall titles: 0 – (15th in 1988)
Medal record
Women's cross-country skiing
Representing Sweden
Junior World Championships
Gold medal – first place	1985 Täsch	5 km
Silver medal – second place	1985 Täsch	3 × 5 km relay

Anna-Lena Fritzon (born 7 March 1965) is a Swedish former cross-country skier who competed from 1985 to 1994. Her best career finish at the Winter Olympics was sixth twice in the 4 × 5 km relay (1988, 1994) while her best individual finish was ninth in the 20 km event at Calgary in 1988.

Fritzon's best finish at the FIS Nordic World Ski Championships was tenth in the 30 km event at Falun in 1993. Her best World Cup finish was second in a 20 km event in Italy in 1988.

Fritzon, born in 1965 in Falun, was also a successful triathlete with a second place in European World Championship held in 1986 in Immenstadt, West Germany. She was ninth in the 10 km in the 1984 Biathlon World Championship held in Chamonix, France. As a cross-country skier Fritzon became the first Swedish woman to win a gold medal in Junior World Championship in the 10 km event held in 1985 in Täsch, Switzerland. The same year she was honoured with "Estrellas Gold chips" for the debutant in Swedish sport of the year together with the football player Mats Gren. Her best World Cup finish was second in the 20 km event held in 1988 in Toblach, Italy and number three in the World Cup at Falun, Sweden in 1985. In the 1988 Winter Olympic Games her best place was ninth in the 20 km event. Fritzon's best finish at the FIS Nordic World Ski Championship 1993 was tenth in the 30 km event at Falun, Sweden. She has one gold, three silver and five bronze medals to her credit in the Swedish cross-country skiing championships.

== Cross-country skiing results ==
All results are sourced from the International Ski Federation (FIS).

=== Olympic Games ===
Year	Age	5 km	10 km	15 km	Pursuit	20 km	30 km	4 × 5 km relay
1988	22	17	13	—N/a	—N/a	9	—N/a	6
1994	28	35	—N/a	19	25	—N/a	—	6

=== World Championships ===
Year	Age	5 km	10 km classical	10 km freestyle	15 km	Pursuit	30 km	4 × 5 km relay
1989	23	—N/a	—	26	14	—N/a	12	4
1993	27	31	—N/a	—N/a	—	19	10	6

=== World Cup ===
==== Season standings ====
Season	Age	Overall
1985	20	24
1986	21	38
1988	23	15
1989	24	42
1990	25	NC
1993	28	26
1994	29	36

==== Individual podiums ====
- 2 podiums

No.	Season	Date	Location	Race	Level	Place
1	1984–85	9 March 1985	Falun, Sweden	10 km Individual	World Cup	3rd
2	1987–88	15 January 1988	Toblach, Italy	20 km Individual F	World Cup	2nd

==== Team podiums ====
- 3 podiums

No.	Season	Date	Location	Race	Level	Place	Teammates
1	1984–85	10 March 1985	Falun, Sweden	4 × 5 km Relay	World Cup	2nd	Risby / Johansson / Lamberg-Skog
2	1984–85	17 March 1985	Oslo, Norway	4 × 5 km Relay	World Cup	2nd	Johansson / Mörtberg / Lamberg-Skog
3	1988–88	12 March 1989	Falun, Sweden	4 × 5 km Relay C	World Cup	3rd	Svingstedt / Wallin / Lamberg-Skog
