= Andreas Ehrig =

German speed skater

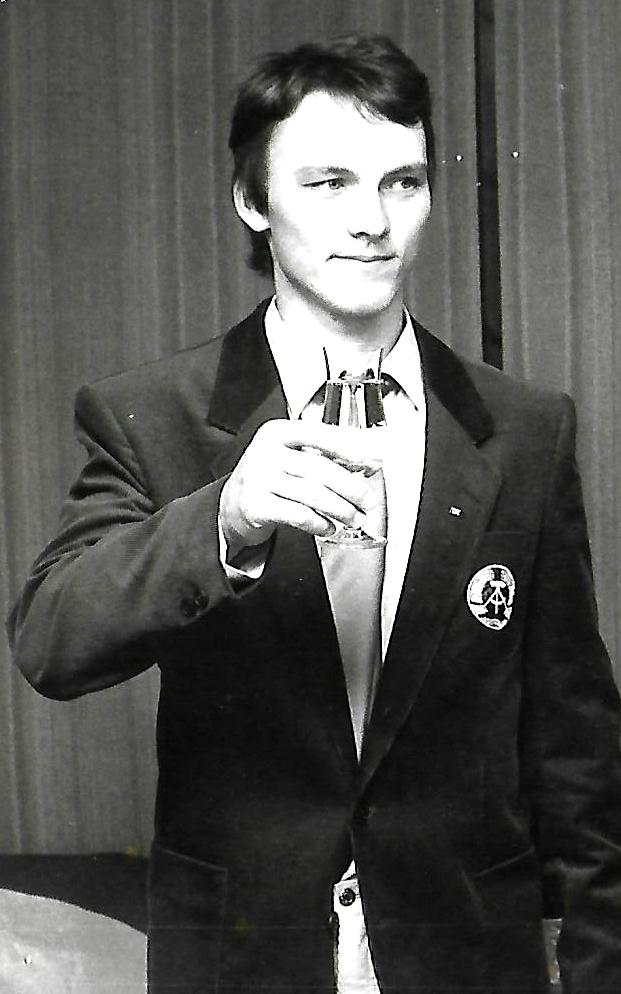
Andreas Ehrig

Andreas Ehrig (born 20 October 1959 in Langenbernsdorf) is a former speed skater from East Germany. Ehrig took part twice in the Winter Olympics in 1980 and 1984, where he ended five times in the top ten and once finished eleventh.

== Personal records ==
Personal records
Men's Speed skating
Event	Result	Date	Location	Notes
500 m	38,40	4 November 1977	Medeo	
1,000 m	1:16,80	17 March 1979	Medeo	
1,500 m	1:56,40	5 November 1977	Medeo	
3,000 m	4:06,77	28 March 1979	Medeo	
5,000 m	7:00,56	23 March 1984	Medeo	
10,000 m	14:51,94	13 February 1980	Lake Placid	

== Resultats ==
year	European Allround	World Allround	Olympics	World Juniors
1977	NC23 (19, 19, 26, -)	–		–
1978	14th (12, 15, 14, 13)	14th (21, 10, 20, 13)		4th (8, 6, 7, 7)
1979	15th (5, 16, 17, 14)	NC20 (24, 17, 15, -)		(silver); (silver) , 4, (gold) , 8)
1980	10th (11, 8, 8, 6)	8th (8, 8, 10, 13)	9th 1500m 10th 5000m 8th 10000m	
1981	10th (12, 8, 7, 14)	5th (15, 5, 11, 4)		
1982	–	NC20 (18, 19, 19, -)		
1983	–	–		
1984	4th ( (bronze) , 17, 4, 5)	(silver) (4, 4, (bronze) , 9)	5th 1500m 4th 5000m 11th 10000m	

- = no participation
NC# = not qualified for the final distance, but as # listed in the final ranking
(#, #, #, #) = distance position on all-round tournament (500m, 5000m, 1500m, 10000m) or on junior tournament (500m, 1500m, 1000m, 3000m).

=== Medal table ===
Championship	Gold medal	Silver medal	Bronze medal
European Allround	0	0	0
Olympics	0	0	0
World Allround	0	1	0
World Juniors	0	1	0
