= Betsy Haines =

American skier (born 1960)

Personal information
- Born: November 5, 1960 (age 65) Salt Lake City, Utah, United States

Sport
- Sport: Cross-country skiing

Betsy Haines (born November 5, 1960) is an American cross-country skier. She competed in the women's 5 kilometres at the 1980 Winter Olympics. Haines is a University of Vermont graduate (class of 1984), and competed on the school's Nordic ski team.
