= Carola Anding =

East German cross-country skier (born 1960)

Personal information
- Born: 29 December 1960 (age 65) Struth-Helmershof, Thuringian Forest, East Germany

Sport
- Sport: Skiing

World Cup career
- Seasons: 3 – (1982, 1984, 1986)
- Indiv. starts: 11
- Indiv. podiums: 1
- Indiv. wins: 0
- Team starts: 3
- Team podiums: 1
- Team wins: 0
- Overall titles: 0 – (13th in 1986)
Medal record
Women's cross-country skiing
Representing East Germany
Olympic Games
Gold medal – first place	1980 Lake Placid	4 × 5 km relay
World Championships
Bronze medal – third place	1982 Oslo	4 × 5 km relay
Junior World Championships
Gold medal – first place	1979 Mont-Sainte-Anne	3 × 5 km relay
Bronze medal – third place	1979 Mont-Sainte-Anne	5 km

Carola Anding (née Jacob; born 29 December 1960) is a former East German cross-country skier who competed during the early 1980s. She won a gold medal in the 4 × 5 km relay at the 1980 Winter Olympics in Lake Placid, New York.

Anding also won a bronze medal in the 4 × 5 km relay at the 1982 FIS Nordic World Ski Championships.

== Cross-country skiing results ==
All results are sourced from the International Ski Federation (FIS).

=== Olympic Games ===
- 1 medal – (1 gold)

Year	Age	5 km	10 km	20 km	4 × 5 km relay
1980	19	—	12	—N/a	Gold
1984	23	21	24	30	8

=== World Championships ===
- 1 medal – (1 bronze)

Year	Age	5 km	10 km	20 km	4 × 5 km relay
1980	19	—N/a	—N/a	8	—N/a
1982	21	20	16	—	Bronze

=== World Cup ===
==== Season standings ====
Season	Age	Overall
1982	22	31
1984	24	26
1986	26	13

==== Individual podiums ====
- 1 podium

No.	Season	Date	Location	Race	Level	Place
1	1985–86	11 January 1986	Les Saisies, France	10 km Individual F	World Cup	2nd

==== Team podiums ====
- 1 podium

No.	Season	Date	Location	Race	Level	Place	Teammates
1	1981–82	24 February 1982	Oslo, Norway	4 × 5 km Relay	World Championships^{[1]}	3rd	Sölter / Schmidt / Petzold

Note: ^{1} Until the 1999 World Championships, World Championship races were included in the World Cup scoring system.
