= Jorma Etelälahti =

Finnish Olympic skier

Medal record

Men's Nordic combined

World Championships
Silver medal – second place	1982 Oslo	3 x 10 km team

Jorma Etelälahti (born 17 November 1951) is a Finnish former Nordic combined skier. He earned a silver in the 3 x 10 km team event at the 1982 FIS Nordic World Ski Championships in Oslo. He also competed at the 1976 Winter Olympics and the 1980 Winter Olympics.
