= Karsten Brandt =

German cross-country skier (born 1958)

Personal information
- Nationality: German
- Born: 14 September 1958 (age 66); Wernigerode, East Germany

Sport
- Sport: Cross-country skiing

Karsten Brandt (born 14 September 1958) is an East German former cross-country skier. He competed in the men's 15 kilometre event at the 1984 Winter Olympics. Brandt was also a twelve-time national champion in East Germany.
