= Keijo Korhonen (ski jumper) =

Finnish ski jumper

Medal record

Men's ski jumping

Representing Finland

World Championships
Bronze medal – third place	1982 Oslo	Team large hill

Winter Universiade
Silver medal – second place	1981 Jaca	Normal hill

Keijo Korhonen (born 7 October 1956 in Leppävirta) is a Finnish former ski jumper who competed from 1979 to 1983. He won a bronze medal in the team large hill at the 1982 FIS Nordic World Ski Championships in Oslo.

Korhonen's best individual finish was 4th in the large hill at Oberstdorf in 1979.
