= Steffen Döring =

German speed skater

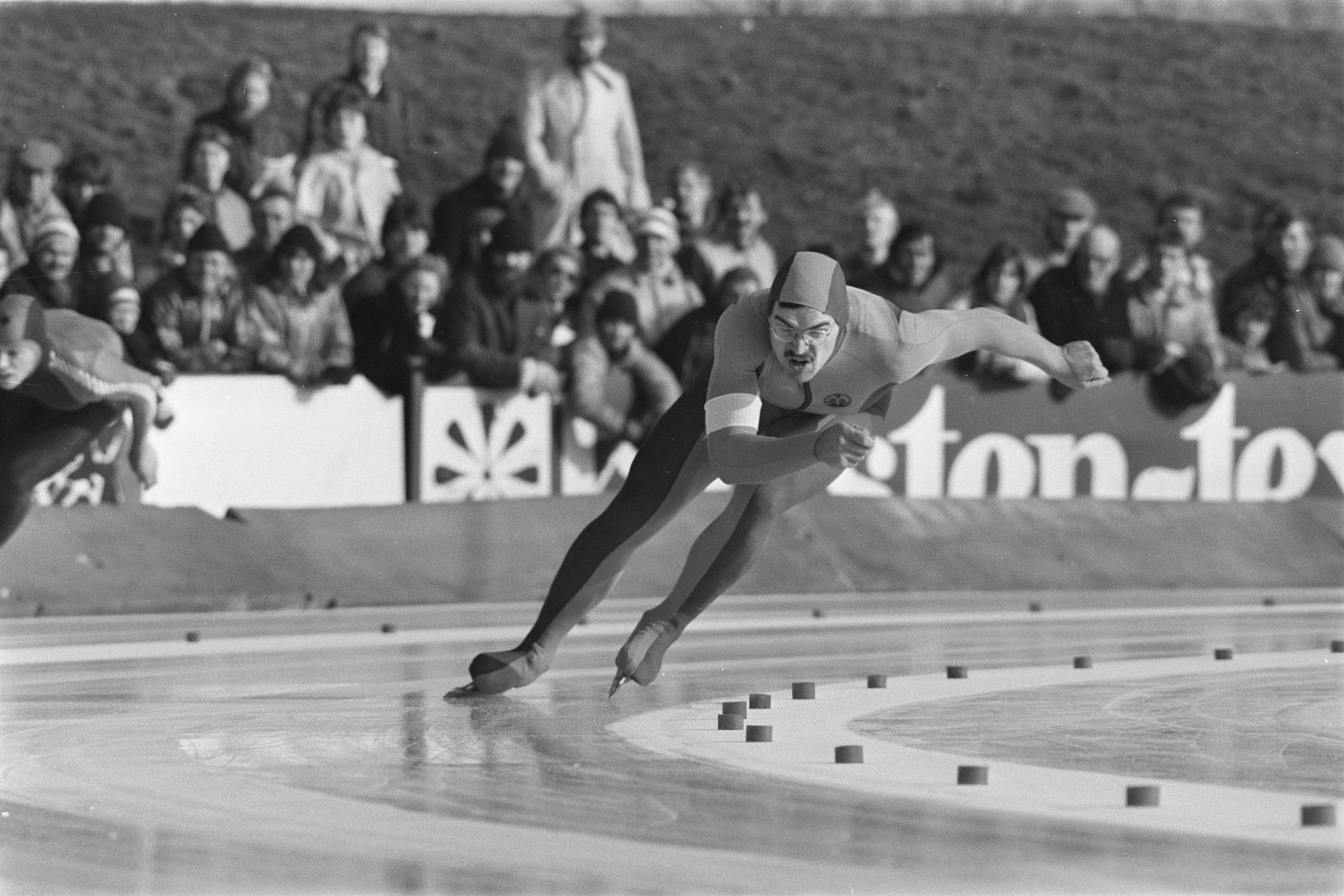
- Steffen Doering in 1982

Personal information
- Nationality: German
- Born: 4 October 1960 (age 64); Berlin, Germany

Sport
- Sport: Speed skating

Steffen Döring (born 4 October 1960) is a German speed skater. He competed in two events at the 1980 Winter Olympics.
