= Marlies Rostock =

East German cross-country skier (born 1960)

Personal information
- Nationality: Germany
- Born: 20 April 1960 (age 66) Klingenthal, East Germany

Sport
- Sport: Skiing
- Club: SC Dynamo Klingenthal
Medal record
Women's cross-country skiing
Representing East Germany
Olympic Games
Gold medal – first place	1980 Lake Placid	4 × 5 km relay
World Championships
Silver medal – second place	1978 Lahti	4 × 5 km relay
Junior World Championships
Gold medal – first place	1977; Sainte-Croix	3 × 5 km relay
Gold medal – first place	1979 Mont-Sainte-Anne	5 km
Gold medal – first place	1979 Mont-Sainte-Anne	3 × 5 km relay

Marlies Rostock (born 20 April 1960) is a former East German cross-country skier who competed from 1978 to 1980. She won a gold medal in the 4 × 5 km relay at the 1980 Winter Olympics in Lake Placid, New York.

She competed for the SG Dynamo Klingenthal / Sportvereinigung (SV) Dynamo. Rostock also won a silver medal in the 4 × 5 km relay at the 1978 FIS Nordic World Ski Championships in Lahti.

== Cross-country skiing results ==
All results are sourced from the International Ski Federation (FIS).

=== Olympic Games ===
- 1 medal – (1 gold)

Year	Age	5 km	10 km	4 × 5 km relay
1980	20	9	7	Gold

=== World Championships ===
- 1 medal – (1 silver)

Year	Age	5 km	10 km	20 km	4 × 5 km relay
1978	18	12	—	—	Silver
1980	20	—N/a	—N/a	4	—N/a
