= André Hoffmann (speed skater) =

German speed skater

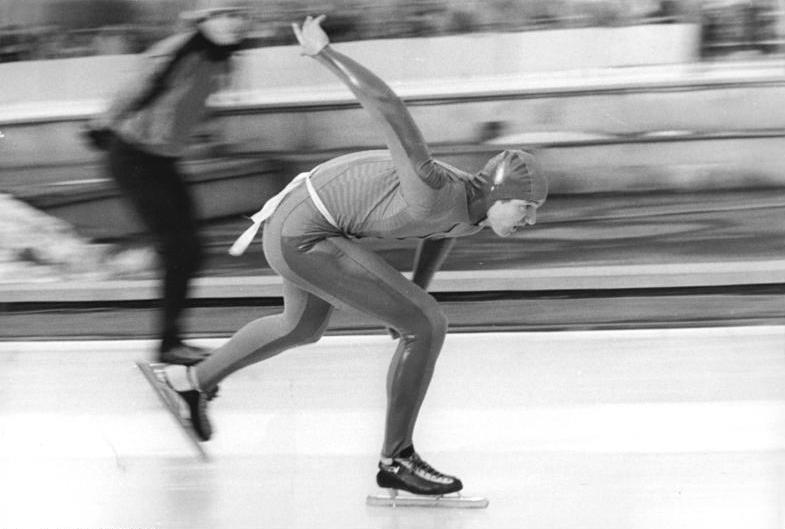
- André Hoffmann in 1983

Personal information
- Nationality: German
- Born: 11 August 1961 (age 65) East Berlin, East Germany
- Height: 1.87 m (6 ft 2 in)
- Weight: 80 kg (176 lb)

Sport
- Country: East Germany; Germany
- Sport: Speed skating
- Club: SC Dynamo Berlin

Achievements and titles
- Personal bests: 500 m: 37.40 (1983); 1000 m: 1:13.82 (1986); 1500 m: 1:52.06 (1988); 3000 m: 4:03.31 (1985); 5000 m: 6:56.25 (1984); 10 000 m: 15:00.43 (1984)
Medal record
Men's Speed skating
Representing East Germany
Olympic Games
Gold medal – first place	1988 Calgary	1500 m

André Hoffmann (born 11 August 1961) is a German former Speed skater who made a huge step forwards in the 1987–1988 season and won two 1500 metres races in the World Cup. It was even though highly surprising that he took gold medal in the 1500 m at the 1988 Olympics in Calgary. He beat the American Eric Flaim with six hundreds of a second and set a new world record with 1:52.06.

== World records ==
Discipline	Time	Date	Location
3000 m	4.03,31	12 January 1985	Davos
Small combination	161.158	13 January 1985	Davos
1500 m	1.52,06	20 February 1988	Calgary

Source: SpeedSkatingStats.com
