= Alf-Gerd Deckert =

East German cross-country skier (born 1955)

Personal information
- Born: 4 July 1955 (age 70) Halle (Saale), East Germany

Sport
- Sport: Cross-country skiing
- Club: SC Dynamo Klingenthal

Alf-Gerd Deckert (born 4 July 1955) is a retired cross-country skier from East Germany. He competed at the 1980 Winter Olympics in the 15 km, 30 km and 50 km events and finished in 37th, 9th and 26th place, respectively.

He was married to Petra Thümer, a German Olympic swimmer. His brother Manfred is a retired Olympic ski jumper.
