= FIS Nordic World Ski Championships 1980 =

International Nordic skiing competition

- Host city: Falun
- Country: Sweden
- Events: 1

The FIS Nordic World Ski Championships 1980 in cross-country skiing took place in Falun, Sweden on 8 March 1980. This was an extraordinary event because the women's 20 km event was not held at the Winter Olympics in Lake Placid.

== Women's 20 km ==
March 8, 1980

Medal	Athlete	Time
Gold	Veronika Hesse (GDR)	1:01:58.23
Silver	Galina Kulakova (URS)	1:02:26.34
Bronze	Raisa Smetanina (URS)	1:02:41.70
4	Marlies Rostock (GDR)	1:03:20.01
5	Nina Baldycheva (URS)	1:03:25.59
6	Zinaida Amosova (URS)	1:03:57.13
7	Berit Aunli (NOR)	1:04:35.90
8	Carola Anding (GDR)	1:05:09.84
9	Shirley Firth (CAN)	1:05:38.91
10	Anette Bøe (NOR)	1:06:09.25

Venue: Falun, Sweden

== Medal table ==
Rank	Nation	Gold	Silver	Bronze	Total
1	East Germany (GDR)	1	0	0	1
2	Soviet Union (URS)	0	1	1	2
Totals (2 entries)		1	1	1	3
