= FIS Nordic World Ski Championships 1982 =

International Nordic skiing competition

FIS Nordic World Ski Championships
- Host city: Oslo
- Country: Norway
- Events: 13
- Opening: February 19, 1982
- Closing: February 28, 1982
- Main venue: Holmenkollen National Arena

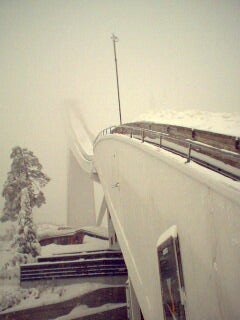
2004 picture of the ski jump used for the 1982 championships.

The FIS Nordic World Ski Championships 1982 took place on 19–28 February 1982 in Oslo, Norway at the Holmenkollen ski arena. This was Oslo's record-tying fourth time hosting the event after previously doing so in 1930, the 1952 Winter Olympics, and 1966. The Nordic combined 3 × 10 km team event and the ski jumping team large hill events were added to these championships. It was also the year in which cross country competitions had the freestyle (or skating) technique debuted and that electronic timing returned to scoring the results in tenths of a second after Sweden's Thomas Wassberg edged out Finland's Juha Mieto by 0.01 seconds in the men's 15 km event at the 1980 Winter Olympics in Lake Placid. The timing of the event in tenths of a second has continued as of 2011 in all Nordic skiing events.

== Men's cross country ==
=== 15 km ===
23 February 1982

Medal	Athlete	Time
Gold	Oddvar Brå (NOR)	38:52.5
Silver	Aleksandr Zavyalov (URS)	39:02.1
Bronze	Harri Kirvesniemi (FIN)	39:02.3

=== 30 km ===
20 February 1982

Medal	Athlete	Time
Gold	Thomas Eriksson (SWE)	1:21:52.3
Silver	Lars Erik Eriksen (NOR)	1:22:13.9
Bronze	Bill Koch (USA)	1:22:14.8

Bill Koch, who developed the freestyle technique used in cross-country skiing, was the first American to medal at the FIS Nordic World Ski Championships.

=== 50 km ===
27 February 1982

Medal	Athlete	Time
Gold	Thomas Wassberg (SWE)	2:32:00.9
Silver	Yuriy Burlakov (URS)	2:32:34.3
Bronze	Lars-Erik Eriksen (NOR)	2:32:49.9

=== 4 × 10 km relay ===
25 February 1982

Medal	Team	Time
Gold	Norway (Lars Erik Eriksen, Ove Aunli, Pål Gunnar Mikkelsplass, Oddvar Brå)	1:56:27.6
Gold	Soviet Union (Vladimir Nikitin, Oleksandr Batyuk, Yuriy Burlakov, Aleksandr Zavyalov)	1:56:27.6
Bronze	Finland (Kari Härkönen, Aki Karvonen, Harri Kirvesniemi, Juha Mieto)	1:58:49.4
Bronze	East Germany (Uwe Bellmann, Uwe Wünsch, Stefan Schicker, Frank Schröder)	1:58:49.4

== Women's cross country ==
=== 5 km ===
22 February 1982

Medal	Athlete	Time
Gold	Berit Aunli (NOR)	14:30.2
Silver	Hilkka Riihivuori (FIN)	14:35.6
Bronze	Brit Pettersen (NOR)	14:48.2

=== 10 km ===
19 February 1982

Medal	Athlete	Time
Gold	Berit Aunli (NOR)	29:25.9
Silver	Hilkka Riihivuori (FIN)	29:46.5
Bronze	Květa Jeriová (TCH)	30:15.8

=== 20 km ===
26 February 1982

Medal	Athlete	Time
Gold	Raisa Smetanina (URS)	1:06:16.9
Silver	Berit Aunli (NOR)	1:06:20.3
Bronze	Hilkka Riihivuori (FIN)	1:07:29.6

=== 4 × 5 km relay ===
24 February 1982

Medal	Team	Time
Gold	Norway (Anette Bøe, Inger Helene Nybråten, Berit Aunli, Brit Pettersen)	1:02:15.9
Silver	Soviet Union (Lyubov Lyadova, Lyubov Zabolotskaya, Raisa Smetanina, Galina Kulakova)	1:02:29.6
Bronze	East Germany (Petra Sölter, Carola Anding, Barbara Petzold, Veronika Hesse)	1:02:57.3

== Men's Nordic combined ==
=== 15 km Individual ===
19 February 1982

Medal	Athlete	Points
Gold	Tom Sandberg (NOR)	426.600
Silver	Konrad Winkler (GDR)	426.560
Bronze	Uwe Dotzauer (GDR)	426.455

=== 3 × 10 km team ===
24 February 1982

Medal	Team	Points
Gold	East Germany (Uwe Dotzauer, Günther Schmieder, Konrad Winkler)	1295.92
Silver	Finland (Jouko Karjalainen, Rauno Miettinen, Jorma Etelälahti)	1243.60
Silver	Norway (Hallstein Bøgseth, Espen Andersen, Tom Sandberg)	1243.60

== Men's ski jumping ==
=== Individual normal hill ===
21 February 1982

Medal	Athlete	Points
Gold	Armin Kogler (AUT)	249.3
Silver	Jari Puikkonen (FIN)	248.6
Bronze	Ole Bremseth (NOR)	245.8

=== Individual large hill ===
28 February 1982

Medal	Athlete	Points
Gold	Matti Nykänen (FIN)	257.9
Silver	Olav Hansson (NOR)	255.1
Bronze	Armin Kogler (AUT)	244.7

=== Team large hill ===
26 February 1982

Medal	Team	Points
Gold	Norway (Johan Sætre, Per Bergerud, Ole Bremseth, Olav Hansson)	718.5
Silver	Austria (Hans Wallner, Hubert Neuper, Armin Kogler, Andreas Felder)	717.6
Bronze	Finland (Keijo Korhonen, Jari Puikkonen, Pentti Kokkonen, Matti Nykänen)	670.8

== Medal table ==
Rank	Nation	Gold	Silver	Bronze	Total
1	Norway (NOR)	7	4	3	14
2	Soviet Union (URS)	2	3	0	5
3	Sweden (SWE)	2	0	0	2
4	Finland (FIN)	1	4	4	9
5	East Germany (GDR)	1	1	3	5
6	Austria (AUT)	1	1	1	3
7	Czechoslovakia (TCH)	0	0	1	1
7	United States (USA)	0	0	1	1
Totals (8 entries)		14	13	13	40
