= Cross-country skiing at the 1980 Winter Olympics – Women's 10 kilometre =

Cross-country skiing at the Olympics

Women's 10km at the XIII Olympic Winter Games
- Cross-country skiing
- Venue: Cross Country Skiing Stadium
- Date: 18 February 1980
- Competitors: 38 from 12 nations
- Winning time: 30:31.54

Medalists
1st place, gold medalist(s)		Barbara Petzold; East Germany
2nd place, silver medalist(s)		Hilkka Riihivuori; Finland
3rd place, bronze medalist(s)		Helena Takalo; Finland

The Women's 10 kilometre cross-country skiing event was part of the cross-country skiing programme at the 1980 Winter Olympics, in Lake Placid, United States. It was the eighth appearance of the event. The competition was held on 18 February 1980, at the Cross Country Skiing Stadium.

== Results ==
Rank	Name	Country	Time
1	Barbara Petzold	East Germany	30:31.54
2	Hilkka Riihivuori	Finland	30:35.05
3	Helena Takalo	Finland	30:45.25
4	Raisa Smetanina	Soviet Union	30:54.48
5	Galina Kulakova	Soviet Union	30:58.46
6	Nina Fyodorova-Baldycheva	Soviet Union	31:22.93
7	Marlies Rostock	East Germany	31:28.79
8	Veronika Hesse-Schmidt	East Germany	31:29.14
9	Květa Jeriová	Czechoslovakia	31:29.55
10	Eva Olsson	Sweden	31:36.08
11	Lena Carlzon-Lundbäck	Sweden	31:45.50
12	Carola Anding	East Germany	31:45.82
13	Berit Aunli-Kvello	Norway	31:46.11
14	Iraida Suslova	Soviet Union	31:48.39
15	Marie Johansson-Risby	Sweden	31:48.57
16	Dagmar Palečková-Švubová	Czechoslovakia	32:03.32
17	Karin Lamberg-Skog	Sweden	32:10.44
18	Marja-Liisa Kirvesniemi-Hämäläinen	Finland	32:22.88
19	Gabriela Svobodová-Sekajová	Czechoslovakia	32:23.05
20	Marit Myrmæl	Norway	32:25.14
21	Susi Riermeier	West Germany	32:37.57
22	Alison Owen-Spencer	United States	32:41.33
23	Angela Schmidt-Foster	Canada	32:56.13
24	Shirley Firth	Canada	32:56.87
25	Beth Paxson	United States	33:01.60
26	Karin Jäger	West Germany	33:01.76
27	Evi Kratzer	Switzerland	33:03.65
28	Leslie Bancroft-Krichko	United States	33:04.71
29	Blanka Paulů	Czechoslovakia	33:08.31
30	Hilde Riis	Norway	33:08.68
31	Lynn von der Heide-Spencer-Galanes	United States	33:13.89
32	Ulla Maaskola	Finland	33:22.19
33	Esther Miller	Canada	33:29.03
34	Joan Groothuysen	Canada	33:31.99
35	Colleen Bolton	Australia	33:56.32
36	Cornelia Thomas	Switzerland	33:57.94
37	Hege Peikli	Norway	34:05.03
38	Ren Guiping	China	38:23.45
