= Günther Schmieder =

East German Nordic combined skier

Medal record

Men's Nordic combined

World Championships
| Gold medal – first place | 1982 Oslo | 3 x 10 km team |

Gunter Schmieder (born 27 July 1957 in Marienberg) is an East German Nordic combined skier who competed from 1976 to 1984. He won a gold medal in the 3 x 10 km team event at the 1982 FIS Nordic World Ski Championships in Oslo and finished fifth in the 15 km individual event in the same world championships in 1978 and 1982.

Schmieder finished 8th in the individual event at the 1980 Winter Olympics and 15th in the same event at the 1984 Winter Olympics. He won two individual events in his career; in 1976 and in 1977.
