= Andreas Dietel =

German speed skater

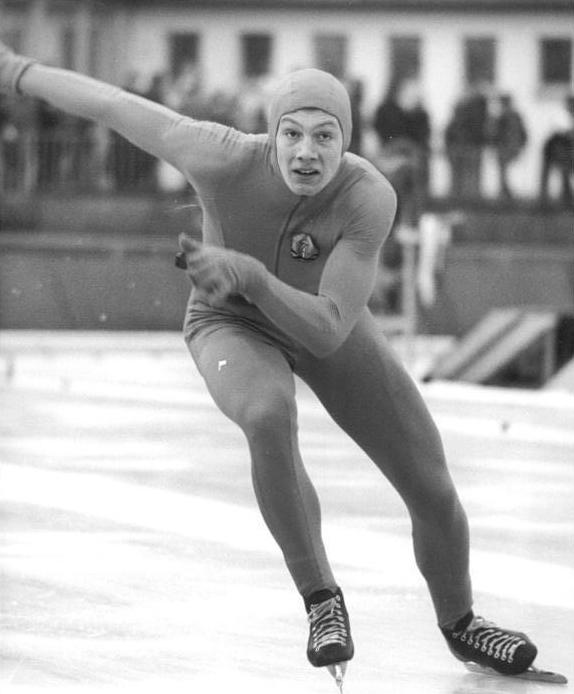
- Andreas Dietel in 1978

Personal information
- Nationality: German
- Born: 20 October 1959 (age 65); Langenbernsdorf, East Germany

Sport
- Sport: Speed skating

Andreas Dietel (born 20 October 1959) is a German speed skater. He competed at the 1980 Winter Olympics and the 1984 Winter Olympics.
