= Uwe Dotzauer =

East German Nordic combined skier

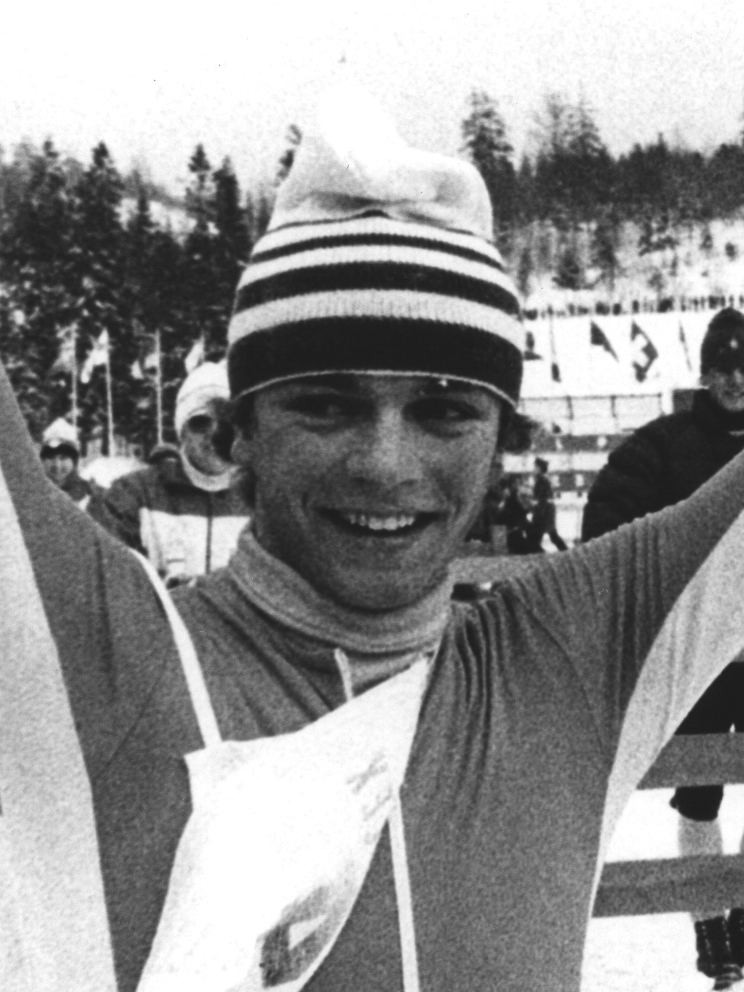
- Uwe Dotzauer in 1980

Medal record

Men's Nordic combined

World Championships
Gold medal – first place	1982 Oslo	3 x 10 km team
Bronze medal – third place	1982 Oslo	15 km individual

Uwe Dotzauer (born 19 February 1959 in Klingenthal) is an East German Nordic combined skier who competed from 1977 to 1987. He won two medals at the 1982 FIS Nordic World Ski Championships in Oslo with gold in the 3 x 10 team and bronze in the 15 km individual.

Dotzauer won the Nordic combined event at the 1980 Holmenkollen ski festival. He competed in two Winter Olympics, finishing 5th in 1980 and 7th in 1984.

Dotzauer's only additional victory came in Seefeld, Austria in 1983.
