= Stefan Schicker =

Saxon cross-country skier

Medal record

Representing East Germany

Men's cross-country skiing

World Championships
Bronze medal – third place	1982 Oslo	4 × 10 km relay

Junior World Championships
Bronze medal – third place	1981 Schonach	3 × 5 km relay

Stefan Schicker is a former Saxon cross-country skier who competed in the early 1980s. He earned a bronze medal in the 4 × 10 km relay at the 1982 FIS Nordic World Ski Championships in Oslo (Tied with Finland). He started for the SG Dynamo Klingenthal / Sportvereinigung (SV) Dynamo.
