= Cross-country skiing at the 1980 Winter Olympics – Women's 5 kilometre =

Cross-country skiing at the Olympics

Women's 5km at the XIII Olympic Winter Games
- Cross-country skiing
- Venue: Mt. Van Hoevenberg Recreation Area
- Date: 15 February 1980
- Competitors: 38 from 12 nations
- Winning time: 15:06.92

Medalists
1st place, gold medalist(s)		Raisa Smetanina; Soviet Union
2nd place, silver medalist(s)		Hilkka Riihivuori; Finland
3rd place, bronze medalist(s)		Květa Jeriová; Czechoslovakia

The Women's 5 kilometre cross-country skiing event was part of the cross-country skiing programme at the 1980 Winter Olympics, in Lake Placid, United States. It was the fifth appearance of the event. The competition was held on 15 February 1980, at the Mt. Van Hoevenberg Recreation Area.

== Results ==
Rank	Name	Country	Time
1	Raisa Smetanina	Soviet Union	15:06.92
2	Hilkka Riihivuori	Finland	15:11.96
3	Květa Jeriová	Czechoslovakia	15:23.44
4	Barbara Petzold	East Germany	15:23.62
5	Nina Fyodorova-Baldycheva	Soviet Union	15:29.03
6	Galina Kulakova	Soviet Union	15:29.58
7	Veronika Hesse-Schmidt	East Germany	15:31.83
8	Helena Kivioja-Takalo	Finland	15:32.12
9	Marlies Rostock	East Germany	15:36.28
10	Lena Carlzon-Lundbäck	Sweden	15:43.04
11	Marie Johansson-Risby	Sweden	15:47.19
12	Eva Olsson	Sweden	15:48.59
13	Dagmar Palečková-Švubová	Czechoslovakia	15:48.78
14	Berit Aunli-Kvello	Norway	15:48.93
15	Nina Rocheva	Soviet Union	15:50.39
16	Ute Nestler	East Germany	15:53.38
17	Karin Lamberg-Skog	Sweden	15:55.07
18	Marit Myrmæl	Norway	15:58.11
19	Marja-Liisa Kirvesniemi-Hämäläinen	Finland	15:58.27
20	Gabriela Svobodová-Sekajová	Czechoslovakia	16:01.41
21	Brit Pettersen	Norway	16:03.58
22	Alison Owen-Spencer	United States	16:05.04
23	Evi Kratzer	Switzerland	16:14.34
24	Anette Bøe	Norway	16:17.35
25	Marja Auroma	Finland	16:18.44
26	Beth Paxson	United States	16:20.93
27	Joan Groothuysen	Canada	16:23.25
28	Shirley Firth	Canada	16:23.40
29	Angela Schmidt-Foster	Canada	16:28.87
30	Blanka Paulů	Czechoslovakia	16:30.04
31	Susi Riermeier	West Germany	16:31.07
32	Karin Jäger	West Germany	16:38.47
33	Leslie Bancroft-Krichko	United States	16:39.71
34	Cornelia Thomas	Switzerland	16:43.85
35	Sharon Firth	Canada	16:54.66
36	Colleen Bolton	Australia	17:22.68
37	Betsy Haines	United States	17:27.75
38	Ren Guiping	China	19:01.74
