= Barbara Petzold =

East German cross-country skier

Personal information
- Nationality: Germany
- Born: 8 August 1955 (age 70) Hammerunterwiesenthal, East Germany

Sport
- Sport: Skiing
- Club: SC Traktor Oberwiesenthal
Medal record
Women's cross-country skiing
Representing East Germany
Olympic Games
Gold medal – first place	1980 Lake Placid	10 km
Gold medal – first place	1980 Lake Placid	4 × 5 km relay
Bronze medal – third place	1976 Innsbruck	4 × 5 km relay
World Championships
Silver medal – second place	1974 Falun	10 km
Silver medal – second place	1974 Falun	4 × 5 km relay
Silver medal – second place	1978 Lahti	4 × 5 km relay
Bronze medal – third place	1982 Oslo	4 × 5 km relay

Barbara Petzold (later Beyer, born 8 August 1955) is a former East German Cross-country skier who competed during the 1970s and early 1980s. She won two gold medals at the 1980 Winter Olympics in Lake Placid in the 10 km and the 4 × 5 km relay, and a bronze in the 4 × 5 km relay at the 1976 Winter Olympics in Innsbruck.

Petzold also won four medals at the FIS Nordic World Ski Championships, earning three silvers (1974: 10 km, 4 × 5 km relay; 1978: 4 × 5 km relay) and one bronze (1982: 4 × 5 km relay). She is sometimes listed as Barbara Petzold-Beyer in results lists.

She was a member of the eighth East German legislature, or Volkskammer, for the legislative period 1981–1986.

== Cross-country skiing results ==
All results are sourced from the International Ski Federation (FIS).

=== Olympic Games ===
- 3 medals – (2 gold, 1 bronze)

Year	Age	5 km	10 km	4 × 5 km relay
1976	20	11	7	Bronze
1980	24	4	Gold	Gold

=== World Championships ===
- 4 medals – (3 silver, 1 bronze)

Year	Age	5 km	10 km	20 km	4 × 5 km relay
1974	18	4	Silver	—N/a	Silver
1978	22	15	17	9	Silver
1982	26	—	—	—	Bronze
