= Cross-country skiing at the 1980 Winter Olympics – Women's 4 × 5 kilometre relay =

Women's 4 × 5 kilometre relay at the XIII Olympic Winter Games
- Cross-country skiing
- Venue: Cross Country Skiing Stadium
- Date: 21 February 1980
- Competitors: 32 from 8 nations
- Winning time: 1:02:11.10

Medalists
| 1st place, gold medalist(s) | | Marlies Rostock; Carola Anding; Veronika Hesse; Barbara Petzold | East Germany |
| 2nd place, silver medalist(s) | | Nina Baldychova; Nina Selyunina; Galina Kulakova; Raisa Smetanina | Soviet Union |
| 3rd place, bronze medalist(s) | | Brit Pettersen; Anette Bøe; Marit Myrmæl; Berit Aunli | Norway |

The Women's 4 × 5 kilometre relay cross-country skiing event was part of the cross-country skiing programme at the 1980 Winter Olympics, in Lake Placid, United States. It was the seventh appearance of the women's relay event. The competition was held on 21 February 1980, at the Mt. Van Hoevenberg Recreation Area.

== Results ==
| Rank | Bib | Name | Country | Time |
|---|---|---|---|---|
| 1 | 2 | Marlies Rostock; Carola Anding; Veronika Hesse; Barbara Petzold | East Germany | 1:02:11.10 |
| 2 | 3 | Nina Baldychova; Nina Selyunina; Galina Kulakova; Raisa Smetanina | Soviet Union | 1:03:18.30 |
| 3 | 5 | Brit Pettersen; Anette Bøe; Marit Myrmæl; Berit Aunli | Norway | 1:04:13.50 |
| 4 | 6 | Dagmar Palečková-Švubová; Gabriela Svobodová-Sekajová; Blanka Paulů; Květa Jeriová | Czechoslovakia | 1:04:31.39 |
| 5 | 1 | Marja Auroma; Marja-Liisa Hämäläinen; Helena Takalo; Hilkka Riihivuori | Finland | 1:04:41.28 |
| 6 | 4 | Marie Johansson-Risby; Karin Lamberg-Skog; Eva Olsson; Lena Carlzon-Lundbäck | Sweden | 1:05:16.32 |
| 7 | 7 | Alison Owen-Spencer; Beth Paxson; Leslie Bancroft-Krichko; Lynn von der Heide-Spencer-Galanes | United States | 1:06:55.41 |
| 8 | 8 | Angela Schmidt-Foster; Shirley Firth; Esther Miller; Joan Groothuysen | Canada | 1:07:45.75 |
