= United States at the 1984 Winter Olympics =

- Flag of the United States
- IOC code: USA
- NOC: United States Olympic Committee

in Sarajevo
- Competitors: 107 (77 men, 30 women) in 6 sports
- Flag bearer: Frank Masley (luge)
- Medals Ranked 3rd: Gold 4 Silver 4 Bronze 0 Total 8

Winter Olympics appearances (overview)
- 1924; 1928; 1932; 1936; 1948; 1952; 1956; 1960; 1964; 1968; 1972; 1976; 1980; 1984; 1988; 1992; 1994; 1998; 2002; 2006; 2010; 2014; 2018; 2022; 2026

The United States competed at the 1984 Winter Olympics in Sarajevo, Yugoslavia.

== Medalists ==
The following U.S. competitors won medals at the games. In the by discipline sections below, medalists' names are bolded.

Medal	Name	Sport	Event	Date
Gold	Debbie Armstrong	Alpine skiing	Women's giant slalom	February 13
Gold	Bill Johnson	Alpine skiing	Men's downhill	February 16
Gold	Scott Hamilton	Figure skating	Men's singles	February 16
Gold	Phil Mahre	Alpine skiing	Men's slalom	February 19
Silver	Kitty Carruthers; Peter Carruthers	Figure skating	Pairs	February 12
Silver	Christin Cooper	Alpine skiing	Women's giant slalom	February 13
Silver	Rosalynn Sumners	Figure skating	Women's singles	February 18
Silver	Steve Mahre	Alpine skiing	Men's slalom	February 19

== Alpine skiing ==
Men

Athlete	Event	Run 1		Run 2		Total	
Athlete	Event	Time	Rank	Time	Rank	Time	Rank
**Bill Johnson**	Downhill	—				1:45.59	1st place, gold medalist(s)
Doug Lewis	Downhill	—				1:48.49	24
Phil Mahre	Giant slalom	1:22.09	10	1:21.16	7	2:43.25	8
Steve Mahre	Giant slalom	1:23.43	18	1:22.60	18	2:46.03	17
Tiger Shaw	Giant slalom	DNF					
**Phil Mahre**	Slalom	51.55	3	47.86	2	1:39.41	1st place, gold medalist(s)
**Steve Mahre**	Slalom	50.85	1	48.77	8	1:39.62	2nd place, silver medalist(s)
Tiger Shaw	Slalom	53.45	17	DNF			

Women

Athlete	Event	Run 1		Run 2		Total	
Athlete	Event	Time	Rank	Time	Rank	Time	Rank
Debbie Armstrong	Downhill	—				1:15.57	21
Holly Flanders	Downhill	—				1:15.11	16
Maria Maricich	Downhill	—				1:15.55	19
**Debbie Armstrong**	Giant slalom	1:08.97	2	1:12.01	4	2:20.98	1st place, gold medalist(s)
**Christin Cooper**	Giant slalom	1:08.97	1	1:12.51	7	2:21.38	2nd place, silver medalist(s)
Tamara McKinney	Giant slalom	1:10.11	8	1:11.72	1	2:21.83	4
Cindy Nelson	Giant slalom	1:11.44	20	1:13.44	18	2:24.88	18
Christin Cooper	Slalom	DNF					
Tamara McKinney	Slalom	DNF					

== Biathlon ==
Athlete	Event	Time	Misses	Rank
Glen Eberle	Individual	1:22:15.0	4	33
Martin Hagen	Individual	1:30:19.8	12	53
Lyle Nelson	Individual	1:21:05.4	7	26
Bill Carow	Sprint	33:05.8	0	20
Donald Nielsen	Sprint	35:23.3	3	42
Josh Thompson	Sprint	35:10.5	4	40
Bill Carow; Lyle Nelson; Donald Nielsen; Josh Thompson	Relay	1:44:31.9	12 (0+12)	11

== Bobsleigh ==
Athlete	Event	Run 1		Run 2		Run 3		Run 4		Total	
Athlete	Event	Time	Rank	Time	Rank	Time	Rank	Time	Rank	Time	Rank
Frederick Fritsch; Wayne DeAtley	Two-man	53.47	21	53.32	17	52.63	16	52.78	16	3:32.20	17
Brent Rushlaw; James Tyler	Two-man	53.01	16	52.99	12	52.35	13	52.40	8	3:30.75	15
Jeff Jost; Joe Briski; Tom Barnes; Hal Hoye	Four-man	50.83	11	50.97	8	50.89	5	50.64	4	3:23.33	5
Brent Rushlaw; Ed Card; James Tyler; Frank Hansen	Four-man	51.04	13	51.35	14	51.58	18	51.53	15	3:25.50	16

== Cross-country skiing ==
Men

Athlete	Event	Time	Rank
Todd Boonstra	15 km	46:36.5	54
Tim Caldwell	15 km	45:21.2	39
Bill Koch	15 km	43:53.7	27
Dan Simoneau	15 km	43:03.4	18
Kevin Brochman	30 km	1:39:24.6	47
Jim Galanes	30 km	1:37:21.2	36
Bill Koch	30 km	1:33:44.4	21
Dan Simoneau	30 km	1:35:50.7	29
Audun Endestad	50 km	2:24:14.4	18
Jim Galanes	50 km	2:28:00.7	31
Bill Koch	50 km	2:24:02.3	17
Dan Simoneau	50 km	2:25:43.1	26
Tim Caldwell; Jim Galanes; Bill Koch; Dan Simoneau	4 × 10 km relay	1:59:52.3	8

Women

Athlete	Event	Time	Rank
Susan Long	5 km	19:28.5	38
Judy Rabinowitz	5 km	18:41.5	30
Patricia Ross	5 km	19:30.9	40
Lynn von der Heide-Spencer-Galanes	5 km	18:30.8	27
Susan Long	10 km	34:58.9	32
Judy Rabinowitz	10 km	34:35.1	26
Patricia Ross	10 km	35:41.3	39
Lynn von der Heide-Spencer-Galanes	10 km	35:47.4	40
Susan Long	20 km	1:07:25.9	28
Kelly Milligan	20 km	1:11:50.4	37
Judy Rabinowitz	20 km	1:07:11.4	27
Lynn von der Heide-Spencer-Galanes	20 km	1:08:25.0	33
Susan Long; Judy Rabinowitz; Patricia Ross; Lynn von der Heide-Spencer-Galanes	4 × 5 km relay	1:10:48.4	7

== Figure skating ==
Individual

Athlete	Event	CF	SP	FS	Total	
Athlete	Event	Rank	Rank	Rank	TFP	Rank
Brian Boitano	Men's singles	8	3	5	11.0	5
Mark Cockerell	Men's singles	18	17	10	27.6	13
**Scott Hamilton**	Men's singles	1	2	2	3.4	1st place, gold medalist(s)
Tiffany Chin	Ladies' singles	12	2	3	11.0	4
**Rosalynn Sumners**	Ladies' singles	1	5	2	4.6	2nd place, silver medalist(s)
Elaine Zayak	Ladies' singles	13	6	4	14.2	6

Mixed

Athlete	Event	CD	SP / OD	FS / FD	Total	
Athlete	Event	Rank	Rank	Rank	TFP	Rank
**Kitty Carruthers**; **Peter Carruthers**	Pairs	—	2	2	3.0	2nd place, silver medalist(s)
Lea Ann Miller; William Fauver	Pairs	—	10	10	15.0	10
Jill Watson; Burt Lancon	Pairs	—	8	6	10.0	6
Judy Blumberg; Michael Seibert	Ice dancing	3	3	4	7.0	4
Carol Fox; Richard Dalley	Ice dancing	6	5	5	10.4	5
Elisa Spitz; Scott Gregory	Ice dancing	10	10	10	20.0	10

== Ice hockey ==
Summary

Team	Event	First round						Consolation game	Final round			
Team	Event	Opposition Score	Opposition Score	Opposition Score	Opposition Score	Opposition Score	Rank	Opposition Score	Opposition Score	Opposition Score	Opposition Score	Rank
United States men	Men's tournament	Canada; **L** 2–4	Czechoslovakia; **L** 1–4	Norway; **T** 3–3	Austria; **W** 7–3	Finland; **T** 3–3	4	7th place game Poland; **W** 7–4	Did not advance			7

Roster

- Marc Behrend
- Scott Bjugstad
- Bob Brooke
- Chris Chelios
- Mark Fusco
- Scott Fusco
- Steven Griffith
- Paul Guay
- John Harrington
- Tom Hirsch
- Al Iafrate
- David A. Jensen
- David H. Jensen
- Mark Kumpel
- Pat LaFontaine
- Bob Mason
- Corey Millen
- Ed Olczyk
- Gary Sampson
- Phil Verchota

Head coaches: Lou Vairo & Tim Taylor

First round
Top two teams (shaded ones) advanced to the medal round.

Team	Pld	W	L	D	GF	GA	GD	Pts
Czechoslovakia	5	5	0	0	38	7	+31	10
Canada	5	4	1	0	24	10	+14	8
Finland	5	2	2	1	27	19	+8	5
United States	5	1	2	2	16	17	−1	4
Austria	5	1	4	0	13	37	−24	2
Norway	5	0	4	1	15	43	−28	1

Source: HockeyCanada.ca

7 February 1984	United States	**2–4** (1–2, 1–1, 0–1)	**Canada**

9 February 1984	**Czechoslovakia**	**4–1** (2–1, 1–0, 1–0)	United States

11 February 1984	Norway	**3–3** (1–2, 1–0, 1–1)	United States

13 February 1984	**United States**	**7–3** (2–1, 0–1, 5–1)	Austria

15 February 1984	Finland	**3–3** (1–0, 1–2, 1–1)	United States

7th place game

17 February 1984	**United States**	**7–4** (2–2, 4–2, 1–0)	Poland

== Luge ==
Men

Athlete	Event	Run 1		Run 2		Run 3		Run 4		Total	
Athlete	Event	Time	Rank	Time	Rank	Time	Rank	Time	Rank	Time	Rank
David Gilman	Singles	47.341	17	48.178	26	47.151	15	47.187	16	3:09.857	17
Frank Masley	Singles	46.890	15	47.073	16	46.797	12	46.990	15	3:07.750	14
Timothy Nardiello	Singles	47.899	23	47.799	22	47.784	22	47.838	22	3:11.320	21
Raymond Bateman; Frank Masley	Doubles	43.047	12	43.284	13	—				1:26.331	13
Doug Bateman; Ronald Rossi	Doubles	42.400	10	42.251	7	—				1:24.651	9

Women

Athlete	Event	Run 1		Run 2		Run 3		Run 4		Total	
Athlete	Event	Time	Rank	Time	Rank	Time	Rank	Time	Rank	Time	Rank
Toni Damigella	Singles	45.170	25	43.187	15	45.579	24	43.045	17	2:56.981	20
Theresa Riedl	Singles	43.520	16	43.995	24	44.620	21	43.130	18	2:55.265	19
Bonny Warner	Singles	42.632	8	42.647	11	44.103	19	42.528	14	2:51.910	15

== Nordic combined ==
Athlete	Event	Ski Jumping				Cross-country			Total	
Athlete	Event	Jump 1	Jump 2	Total	Rank	Time	Points	Rank	Points	Rank
Pat Ahern	Individual	103.5	91.6	195.1	17	49:55.2	189.520	17	384.620	17
Kerry Lynch	Individual	95.9	85.9	181.8	22	48:02.9	206.365	3	388.165	13
Mike Randall	Individual	70.2	75.6	145.8	27	51:31.0	175.150	25	320.950	28

== Ski jumping ==
Athlete	Event	Jump 1		Jump 2		Total	
Athlete	Event	Distance	Points	Distance	Points	Points	Rank
Landis Arnold	Normal hill	81.0	92.6	79.0	89.4	182.0	28
Jeff Hastings	Normal hill	84.0	99.4	86.0	104.1	203.5	9
Mike Holland	Normal hill	81.0	90.6	87.0	73.7	164.3	41
Dennis McGrane	Normal hill	86.0	102.6	73.0	75.8	178.4	33
Jeff Hastings	Large hill	102.5	95.7	107.0	105.5	201.2	4
Mike Holland	Large hill	90.0	71.2	96.0	83.6	154.8	37
Dennis McGrane	Large hill	71.0	7.1	89.0	72.8	79.9	53
Reed Zuehlke	Large hill	96.0	85.6	95.5	82.9	168.5	29

== Speed skating ==
Men

Athlete	Event	Time	Rank
Erik Henriksen	500 m	39.45	20
Dan Jansen	500 m	38.55	4
Nick Thometz	500 m	38.56	5
Erik Henriksen	1000 m	1:17.64	11
Dan Jansen	1000 m	1:18.73	16
Nick Thometz	1000 m	1:16.85	4
Erik Henriksen	1500 m	2:02.20	21
Mark Mitchell	1500 m	2:04.26	33
Nick Thometz	1500 m	2:00.77	14
Mark Huck	5000 m	7:46.91	35
Mark Mitchell	5000 m	7:34.32	21
Mike Woods	5000 m	7:24.81	12
Mark Mitchell	10,000 m	15:21.24	21
Mike Woods	10,000 m	14:57.30	7

Women

Athlete	Event	Time	Rank
Bonnie Blair	500 m	42.53	8
Katie Class	500 m	42.97	10
Connie Paraskevin-Young	500 m	43.05	13
Katie Class	1000 m	1:27.57	17
Mary Docter	1000 m	1:28.55	24
Lydia Stephans	1000 m	1:26.73	13
Mary Docter	1500 m	2:12.14	14
Jane Goldman	1500 m	2:12.94	17
Nancy Swider-Peltz	1500 m	2:13.74	18
Mary Docter	3000 m	4:36.25	6
Jane Goldman	3000 m	4:42.49	12
Nancy Swider-Peltz	3000 m	4:40.10	10
