= Tamara Markashanskaya =

Soviet skier

Personal information
- Nationality: Russia
- Born: 20 November 1954 (age 71) Smolensk, Russian SFSR, Soviet Union

Sport
- Sport: Skiing

World Cup career
- Seasons: 1983–1984, 1987
- Indiv. starts: 8
- Indiv. podiums: 1
- Indiv. wins: 0
- Team starts: 1
- Team podiums: 1
- Team wins: 0
- Overall titles: 0 – (9th in 1984)

Tamara Markashanskaya (born 20 November 1954) is a Soviet cross-country skier. She competed in the women's 20 kilometres at the 1984 Winter Olympics.

== Cross-country skiing results ==
All results are sourced from the International Ski Federation (FIS).

=== Olympic Games ===
Year	Age	5 km	10 km	20 km	4 × 5 km relay
1984	29	—	—	13	—

=== World Cup ===
==== Season standings ====
Season	Age	Overall
1983	28	35
1984	29	9
1987	32	56

==== Individual podiums ====
- 1 podium

No.	Season	Date	Location	Race	Level	Place
1	1983–84	9 December 1983	Reit im Winkl, West Germany	5 km Individual	World Cup	3rd

==== Team podiums ====
- 1 podium

No.	Season	Date	Location	Race	Level	Place	Teammates
1	1983–84	26 February 1984	Falun, Sweden	4 × 5 km Relay	World Cup	3rd	Zimyatova / Burlakova / Smetanina
