= Germana Sperotto =

Italian cross-country skier

Personal information
- Nationality: Italian
- Born: 6 February 1964 (age 61) Ivrea, Italy

Sport
- Sport: Cross-country skiing

Germana Sperotto (born 6 February 1964) is an Italian cross-country skier. She competed in the women's 20 kilometres at the 1984 Winter Olympics.

== Cross-country skiing results ==
=== Olympic Games ===
Year	Age	5 km	10 km	20 km	4 × 5 km relay
1984	20	—	—	35	—

=== World Cup ===
==== Season standings ====
Season	Age	Overall
1984	20	NC
