= Speed skating at the 1984 Winter Olympics – Men's 1500 metres =

Speed skating at the Olympics

Men's 1500 metres at the XIV Olympic Winter Games
- Pictogram for speed skating
- Venue: Zetra Ice Rink
- Dates: 16 February 1984
- Competitors: 40 from 20 nations
- Winning time: 1:58.36

Medalists
1st place, gold medalist(s)		Gaétan Boucher; Canada
2nd place, silver medalist(s)		Sergey Khlebnikov; Soviet Union
3rd place, bronze medalist(s)		Oleg Bozhev; Soviet Union

The men's 1500 metres in speed skating at the 1984 Winter Olympics took place on 16 February, at the Zetra Ice Rink.

== Records ==
Prior to this competition, the existing world and Olympic records were as follows:

World record	Igor Zhelezovsky (URS)	1:54.26	Alma-Ata, Kazakh SSR, Soviet Union	26 March 1983
Olympic record	Eric Heiden (USA)	1:55.44	Lake Placid, United States	21 February 1980

== Results ==
Rank	Pair	Lane	Athlete	Country	Time	Time behind
1st place, gold medalist(s)	8	o	Gaétan Boucher	Canada	1:58.36	-
2nd place, silver medalist(s)	2	o	Sergey Khlebnikov	Soviet Union	1:58.83	+0.47
3rd place, bronze medalist(s)	5	i	Oleg Bozhev	Soviet Union	1:58.89	+0.53
4	5	o	Hans van Helden	France	1:59.39	+1.03
5	8	i	Andreas Ehrig	East Germany	1:59.41	+1.05
6	14	i	Andreas Dietel	East Germany	1:59.73	+1.37
7	4	i	Hilbert van der Duim	Netherlands	1:59.77	+1.41
8	4	o	Viktor Shasherin	Soviet Union	1:59.81	+1.45
9	11	o	Pertti Niittylä	Finland	2:00.01	+1.65
10	6	o	Frits Schalij	Netherlands	2:00.14	+1.78
11	3	o	André Hoffmann	East Germany	2:00.23	+1.87
12	1	i	Kai Arne Engelstad	Norway	2:00.59	+2.23
12	3	i	Hein Vergeer	Netherlands	2:00.59	+2.23
14	7	o	Nick Thometz	United States	2:00.77	+2.41
15	9	o	Werner Jäger	Austria	2:01.03	+2.67
16	2	i	Hans Magnusson	Sweden	2:01.26	+2.90
17	6	i	Rolf Falk-Larssen	Norway	2:01.65	+3.29
18	10	i	Claes Bengtsson	Sweden	2:02.04	+3.68
19	9	i	Bjørn Nyland	Norway	2:02.05	+3.69
20	10	o	Michael Hadschieff	Austria	2:02.06	+3.70
21	12	o	Erik Henriksen	United States	2:02.20	+3.84
22	19	i	Tibor Kopacz	Romania	2:02.38	+4.02
23	18	i	Lee Yeong-Ha	South Korea	2:02.45	+4.09
24	11	i	Jan Junell	Sweden	2:02.55	+4.19
25	1	o	Wolfgang Scharf	West Germany	2:02.64	+4.28
26	18	o	Hansjörg Baltes	West Germany	2:02.68	+4.32
27	19	o	Andreas Lemcke	West Germany	2:03.13	+4.77
28	17	o	Christian Eminger	Austria	2:03.18	+4.82
29	7	i	Kimihiro Hamaya	Japan	2:03.72	+5.36
30	15	i	Na Yun-Su	South Korea	2:03.90	+5.54
31	17	i	Im Ri-Bin	North Korea	2:03.93	+5.57
32	16	i	Bae Ki-Tae	South Korea	2:04.18	+5.82
33	20	o	Mark Mitchell	United States	2:04.26	+5.90
34	13	i	Mike Richmond	Australia	2:04.62	+6.26
35	13	o	Giorgio Paganin	Italy	2:04.97	+6.61
36	16	o	Kim Hwang-Hyun	North Korea	2:06.80	+8.44
37	12	i	Colin Coates	Australia	2:08.13	+9.77
38	20	i	Li Wei	China	2:08.38	+10.02
39	14	o	Bryan Carbis	Great Britain	2:13.25	+14.89
40	15	o	Behudin Merdović	Yugoslavia	2:19.25	+20.89
