= Cross-country skiing at the 1984 Winter Olympics – Women's 4 × 5 kilometre relay =

Women's 4 × 5 kilometre relay at the XIV Olympic Winter Games
- Cross-country skiing
- Venue: Igman
- Date: 15 February 1984
- Competitors: 48 from 12 nations
- Winning time: 1:06:49.7

Medalists
1st place, gold medalist(s)		Inger Helene Nybråten; Anne Jahren; Britt Pettersen; Berit Aunli	Norway
2nd place, silver medalist(s)		Dagmar Švubová; Blanka Paulů; Gabriela Svobodová; Květa Jeriová	Czechoslovakia
3rd place, bronze medalist(s)		Pirkko Määttä; Eija Hyytiäinen; Marjo Matikainen; Marja-Liisa Hämäläinen	Finland

The 4 × 5 kilometre cross-country skiing event was the only relay event of the women's cross-country skiing programme at the 1984 Winter Olympics, in Sarajevo, Yugoslavia. It was the eighth appearance of the 4 x 5 km relay in the Winter Olympics. The competition was held on Wednesday, 15 February 1984 at Veliko Polje, Igman.

It was the first time since 1968 that Norway won the gold medal in the event.

== Results ==
Rank	Bib	Team	Time
1	3	Norway; Inger Helene Nybråten; Anne Jahren; Britt Pettersen; Berit Aunli	1:06:49.7
2	4	Czechoslovakia; Dagmar Švubová; Blanka Paulů; Gabriela Svobodová; Květa Jeriová	1:07:34.7
3	5	Finland; Pirkko Määttä; Eija Hyytiäinen; Marjo Matikainen; Marja-Liisa Hämäläinen	1:07:36.7
4	2	Soviet Union; Yuliya Stepanova; Lyubov Lyadova; Nadesha Burlakova; Raisa Smetanina	1:07:55.0
5	6	Sweden; Karin Lamberg; Kristina Hugosson; Marie Risby; Ann-Janeth Rosendahl	1:09:30.0
6	10	Switzerland; Karin Thomas; Monika Germann; Christina Brügger; Evi Kratzer	1:09:40.3
7	7	United States; Susan Long; Judy Rabinowitz; Lynn Spencer-Galanes; Patricia Ross	1:10:48.4
8	1	East Germany; Petra Voge; Petra Rohrmann; Carola Anding; Ute Noack	1:11:10.7
9	12	Italy; Clara Angerer; Paola Pozzoni; Manuela Di Centa; Guidina Dal Sasso	1:11:12.3
10	8	Yugoslavia; Jana Mlakar; Andreja Smrekar; Tatjana Smolnikar; Metka Munih	1:13:45.1
11	11	Great Britain; Laura Jeffrey; Nicola Lavery; Doris Trueman; Ros Coats	1:18:36.2
12	9	China; Dou Aixia; Tang Yuqin; Chen Yufeng; Song Shiji	1:21:19.6
