= Stina Karlsson =

Swedish skier

Personal information
- Full name: Stina Ulrika Karlsson
- Nationality: Sweden
- Born: 27 April 1961 (age 65) Jörn, Sweden

Sport
- Sport: Skiing
- Club: Bodens SK

World Cup career
- Seasons: 1 – (1984)
- Indiv. starts: 2
- Indiv. podiums: 0
- Team starts: 0
- Overall titles: 0
Medal record
Women's cross-country skiing
Representing Sweden
Junior World Championships
Bronze medal – third place	1980 Örnsköldsvik	3 × 5 km relay

Stina Ulrika Karlsson (born 27 April 1961) is a Swedish cross-country skier. She competed in two events at the 1984 Winter Olympics. Her daughter Linn Sömskar, is a cross-country skier.

== Cross-country skiing results ==
All results are sourced from the International Ski Federation (FIS).

=== Olympic Games ===
Year	Age	5 km	10 km	20 km	4 × 5 km relay
1984	22	—	31	32	—

=== World Cup ===
==== Season standings ====
Season	Age	Overall
1984	22	NC
