= Kristina Hugosson =

Swedish cross-country skier (born 1963)

Personal information
- Full name: Doris Kristina Hugosson
- Nationality: Sweden
- Born: 7 May 1963 (age 63) Vilhelmina, Sweden

Sport
- Sport: Skiing
- Club: Sorsele SK

World Cup career
- Seasons: 1 – (1984)
- Indiv. starts: 2
- Indiv. podiums: 0
- Team starts: 1
- Team podiums: 0
- Overall titles: 0 – (64th in 1984)

Doris Kristina Hugosson (born 7 May 1963) is a Swedish cross-country skier who competed in the early 1980s. She finished fifth in the 4 × 5 km relay at the 1984 Winter Olympics in Sarajevo.

== Cross-country skiing results ==
All results are sourced from the International Ski Federation (FIS).

=== Olympic Games ===
Year	Age	5 km	10 km	20 km	4 × 5 km relay
1984	20	—	—	31	5

=== World Cup ===
==== Season standings ====
Season	Age	Overall
1984	20	64
