= Eva-Lena Karlsson =

Swedish cross-country skier

Personal information
- Nationality: Sweden
- Born: 28 April 1961 (age 65) Jönköping, Sweden

Sport
- Sport: Skiing

World Cup career
- Seasons: 5 – (1983–1984, 1986–1988)
- Indiv. starts: 9
- Indiv. podiums: 0
- Team starts: 0
- Team podiums: 0
- Overall titles: 0 – (28th in 1983)

Eva-Lena Karlsson (born 28 April 1961) is a Swedish cross-country skier. She competed in the women's 5 kilometres at the 1984 Winter Olympics. She is the older sister of cross-country skier Ann-Marie Karlsson, and the maternal aunt of Frida Karlsson.

== Cross-country skiing results ==
All results are sourced from the International Ski Federation (FIS).

=== Olympic Games ===
Year	Age	5 km	10 km	20 km	4 × 5 km relay
1984	22	37	—	—	—

=== World Championships ===
Year	Age	5 km	10 km	20 km	4 × 5 km relay
1982	20	35	—	40	—
1987	25	15	—	37	—

=== World Cup ===
==== Season standings ====
Season	Age	Overall
1983	22	28
1984	23	NC
1986	25	NC
1987	26	56
1988	27	48
