= Kelly Milligan =

American skier (born 1961)

Personal information
- Born: February 16, 1961 (age 65) Livingston, Montana, United States

Sport
- Sport: Skiing
- Club: Utah Nordic Alliance

World Cup career
- Seasons: 1 – (1984)
- Indiv. starts: 2
- Indiv. podiums: 0
- Team starts: 0

Kelly Milligan (born February 16, 1961) is an American cross-country skier. She competed in the women's 20 kilometre at the 1984 Winter Olympics.

== Cross-country skiing results ==
All results are sourced from the International Ski Federation (FIS).

=== Olympic Games ===
Year	Age	5 km	10 km	20 km	4 × 5 km relay
1984	23	—	—	37	—

=== World Cup ===
==== Season standings ====
Season	Age	Overall
1984	23	NC
