= Great Britain at the 1984 Winter Olympics =

- Flag of the United Kingdom
- IOC code: GBR
- NOC: British Olympic Association

in Sarajevo
- Competitors: 50 (37 men, 13 women) in 7 sports
- Flag bearers: Christopher Dean (opening); Malcolm Lloyd (closing)
- Medals Ranked 11th: Gold 1 Silver 0 Bronze 0 Total 1

Winter Olympics appearances (overview)
- 1924; 1928; 1932; 1936; 1948; 1952; 1956; 1960; 1964; 1968; 1972; 1976; 1980; 1984; 1988; 1992; 1994; 1998; 2002; 2006; 2010; 2014; 2018; 2022; 2026

The United Kingdom of Great Britain and Northern Ireland competed as Great Britain at the 1984 Winter Olympics in Sarajevo, Yugoslavia.

== Medallists ==
Medal	Name	Sport	Event	Date
Gold	Jayne Torvill; Christopher Dean	Figure skating	Ice dance	14 February

== Alpine skiing ==
Men

Athlete	Event	Race 1		Race 2		Total	
Athlete	Event	Time	Rank	Time	Rank	Time	Rank
Frederick Burton	Downhill					1:51.15	37
Connor O'Brien	Downhill					1:50.36	33
Graham Bell	Downhill					1:50.06	32
Martin Bell	Downhill					1:48.00	18
Frederick Burton	Giant Slalom	1:30.32	42	1:30.23	38	3:00.55	39
Nicholas Wilson	Giant Slalom	1:29.26	37	1:30.23	38	2:59.49	38
Martin Bell	Giant Slalom	1:28.42	34	1:28.08	33	2:56.50	32
David Mercer	Giant Slalom	1:27.81	33	1:28.83	34	2:56.64	33
David Mercer	Slalom	DNF	–	–	–	DNF	–
Nicholas Wilson	Slalom	57.33	27	54.75	16	1:52.08	16

Women

Athlete	Event	Race 1		Race 2		Total	
Athlete	Event	Time	Rank	Time	Rank	Time	Rank
Clare Booth	Downhill					DNF	–
Lesley Beck	Slalom	DNF	–	–	–	DNF	–

== Biathlon ==
Men

Event	Athlete	Misses ^{1}	Time	Rank
10 km Sprint	Trevor King	5	36:34.4	51
10 km Sprint	Graeme Ferguson	4	35:37.3	44
10 km Sprint	Jim Wood	2	33:40.2	26

Event	Athlete	Time	Penalties	Adjusted time ^{2}	Rank
20 km	Tony McLeod	1'17:34.5	8	1'25:34.5	44
20 km	Charles MacIvor	1'16:37.5	7	1'23:37.5	37
20 km	Jim Wood	1'14:55.8	4	1'18:55.8	14

Men's 4 x 7.5 km relay

Athletes	Race		
Athletes	Misses ^{1}	Time	Rank
Jim Wood; Patrick Howdle; Tony McLeod; Charles MacIvor	0	1'46:17.2	12

^{1} A penalty loop of 150 metres had to be skied per missed target.
^{2} One minute added per missed target.

== Bobsleigh ==
Sled	Athletes	Event	Run 1		Run 2		Run 3		Run 4		Total	
Sled	Athletes	Event	Time	Rank	Time	Rank	Time	Rank	Time	Rank	Time	Rank
GBR-1	Tom De La Hunty; Peter Lund	Two-man	53.17	18	53.34	18	53.53	27	53.09	19	3:33.13	21
GBR-2	Gomer Lloyd; Peter Brugnani	Two-man	52.80	14	52.73	9	52.26	10	52.57	13	3:30.36	10

Sled	Athletes	Event	Run 1		Run 2		Run 3		Run 4		Total	
Sled	Athletes	Event	Time	Rank	Time	Rank	Time	Rank	Time	Rank	Time	Rank
GBR-1	Michael Pugh; Tony Wallington; Corrie Brown; Mark Tout	Four-man	51.52	21	51.84	20	51.68	20	51.89	21	3:26.93	20
GBR-2	Gomer Lloyd; Howard Smith; Gus McKenzie; Peter Brugnani	Four-man	51.15	17	51.11	10	51.44	13	51.64	18	3:25.34	15

== Cross-country skiing ==
Men

Event	Athlete	Race	
Event	Athlete	Time	Rank
15 km	Martin Watkins	49:08.7	63
15 km	Mike Dixon	48:18.6	60
15 km	Mark Moore	47:03.2	58
15 km	John Spotswood	46:53.7	57
30 km	Stephen Daglish	1'44:04.3	58
30 km	John Spotswood	1'42:23.3	54
30 km	Andrew Rawlin	1'41:33.9	52
30 km	Mark Moore	1'40:22.2	50
50 km	John Spotswood	2'38:03.2	45
50 km	Mark Moore	2'36:32.8	44

Men's 4 × 10 km relay

Athletes	Race	
Athletes	Time	Rank
Mark Moore; Andrew Rawlin; Mike Dixon; John Spotswood	2'10:09.9	14

Women

Event	Athlete	Race	
Event	Athlete	Time	Rank
5 km	Carolina Brittan	21:44.3	50
5 km	Nicola Lavery	21:08.5	47
5 km	Doris Trueman	21:05.6	46
5 km	Ros Coats	20:16.7	44
10 km	Lauren Jeffrey	40:11.2	48
10 km	Doris Trueman	39:28.4	47
10 km	Nicola Lavery	39:05.2	46
10 km	Ros Coats	38:12.2	45
20 km	Nicola Lavery	1'16:24.0	39
20 km	Ros Coats	1'11:24.1	36

Women's 4 × 5 km relay

Athletes	Race	
Athletes	Time	Rank
Lauren Jeffrey; Nicola Lavery; Doris Trueman; Ros Coats	1'18:36.2	11

== Figure skating ==
Men

Athlete	CF	SP	FS	TFP	Rank
Paul Robinson	21	20	22	42.6	22

Women

Athlete	CF	SP	FS	TFP	Rank
Susan Jackson Wagner	19	17	15	33.2	17

Pairs

Athletes	SP	FS	TFP	Rank
Susan Garland; Ian Jenkins	12	14	20.0	14

Ice Dancing

Athletes	CD	OD	FD	TFP	Rank
Wendy Sessions; Stephen Williams	12	11	11	22.4	11
Karen Barber; Nicky Slater	5	6	6	11.6	6
Jayne Torvill; Christopher Dean	1	1	1	2.0	1st place, gold medalist(s)

== Luge ==
Men

Athlete	Run 1		Run 2		Run 3		Run 4		Total	
Athlete	Time	Rank	Time	Rank	Time	Rank	Time	Rank	Time	Rank
Mike Howard	50.415	30	50.090	30	48.343	27	48.315	27	3:17.163	26
Chris Prentice	50.033	28	50.074	29	50.384	30	49.283	29	3:19.774	29
André Usborne	49.901	27	49.853	28	49.447	29	48.438	28	3:17.639	27

Women

Athlete	Run 1		Run 2		Run 3		Run 4		Total	
Athlete	Time	Rank	Time	Rank	Time	Rank	Time	Rank	Time	Rank
Claire Sherred	45.580	27	45.062	25	45.324	23	DSQ	–	DSQ	–

== Speed skating ==
Men

Event	Athlete	Race	
Event	Athlete	Time	Rank
1500 m	Bryan Carbis	2:13.25	39
5000 m	Bryan Carbis	8:01.44	41
