= Lyubov Lyadova =

Soviet cross-country skier

Personal information
- Nationality: Russia
- Born: 17 November 1952 (age 73) Nolinsk, Russian SFSR, Soviet Union

Sport
- Sport: Skiing

World Cup career
- Seasons: 1982–1984
- Indiv. starts: 13
- Indiv. podiums: 0
- Team starts: 2
- Team podiums: 1
- Team wins: 0
- Overall titles: 0 – (6th in 1983)
Medal record
Women's cross-country skiing
Representing Soviet Union
World Championships
Silver medal – second place	1982 Oslo	4 × 5 km relay

Lyubov Lyadova (born 17 November 1952) is a former Soviet cross-country skier who competed during the early 1980s. She won a silver medal in the 4 × 5 km relay at the 1982 FIS Nordic World Ski Championships in Oslo and finished fourth in the 20 km event at those same championships.

Lyadova also won the 10 km event at the 1983 Holmenkollen ski festival. Her best individual finish at the Winter Olympics was seventh in the 20 km event at Sarajevo in 1984.

== Cross-country skiing results ==
All results are sourced from the International Ski Federation (FIS).

=== Olympic Games ===
Year	Age	5 km	10 km	20 km	4 × 5 km relay
1984	31	—	12	7	4

=== World Championships ===
- 1 medal – (1 silver)

Year	Age	5 km	10 km	20 km	4 × 5 km relay
1982	29	19	7	4	Silver

=== World Cup ===
==== Season standings ====
Season	Age	Overall
1982	29	17
1983	30	8
1984	31	22

==== Team podiums ====
- 1 podium

No.	Season	Date	Location	Race	Level	Place	Teammates
1	1981–82	24 February 1982	Oslo, Norway	4 × 5 km Relay	World Championships^{[1]}	2nd	Zabolotskaya / Smetanina / Kulakova

Note: ^{1} Until the 1999 World Championships, World Championship races were included in the World Cup scoring system.
