= Paola Pozzoni =

Italian cross-country skier

Personal information
- Nationality: Italy
- Born: 17 August 1965 (age 60) Lecco, Italy

Sport
- Sport: Skiing
- Club: GSA Valsassina

World Cup career
- Seasons: 3 – (1984, 1987, 1994)
- Indiv. starts: 6
- Indiv. podiums: 0
- Team starts: 3
- Team podiums: 0
- Overall titles: 0 – (56th in 1987)

Paola Pozzoni (born 17 August 1965) is an Italian cross-country skier. Pozzoni was born in Lecco. She competed in the 1984 Winter Olympics in Sarajevo.

== Cross-country skiing results ==
All results are sourced from the International Ski Federation (FIS).

=== Olympic Games ===
| Year | Age | 5 km | 10 km | 20 km | 4 × 5 km relay |
|---|---|---|---|---|---|
| 1984 | 22 | 33 | 34 | — | 9 |

=== World Championships ===
| Year | Age | 5 km | 10 km | 20 km | 4 × 5 km relay |
|---|---|---|---|---|---|
| 1987 | 21 | — | — | — | 5 |

=== World Cup ===
==== Season standings ====
| Season | Age | Overall |
|---|---|---|
| 1984 | 18 | NC |
| 1987 | 21 | 56 |
| 1994 | 28 | NC |
