= Cross-country skiing at the 1984 Winter Olympics – Women's 5 kilometre =

Women's 5km at the XIV Olympic Winter Games
- Cross-country skiing
- Venue: Igman
- Date: February 12, 1984
- Competitors: 52 from 14 nations
- Winning time: 17:04.0

Medalists
1st place, gold medalist(s)		Marja-Liisa Hämäläinen	Finland
2nd place, silver medalist(s)		Berit Aunli	Norway
3rd place, bronze medalist(s)		Květa Jeriová	Czechoslovakia

The 5 kilometre cross-country skiing event was the shortest distance of the women's cross-country skiing programme at the 1984 Winter Olympics, in Sarajevo, Yugoslavia. It was the sixth appearance of the 5 km race. The competition was held on Sunday, February 12, 1984 at Veliko Polje, Igman.

Marja-Liisa Hämäläinen of Finland took her second Gold medal of the games following her win in the 10 km race. All 52 athletes who entered the race finished with an official time.

== Results ==
Rank	Name	Country	Time
1	Marja-Liisa Hämäläinen	Finland	17:04.0
2	Berit Aunli	Norway	17:14.1
3	Květa Jeriová	Czechoslovakia	17:18.3
4	Marie Risby	Sweden	17:26.3
5	Inger Helene Nybråten	Norway	17:28.2
6	Britt Pettersen	Norway	17:33.6
7	Anne Jahren	Norway	17:38.3
8	Ute Noack	East Germany	17:46.0
9	Evi Kratzer	Switzerland	17:47.5
10	Pirkko Määttä	Finland	17:48.0
11	Raisa Smetanina	Soviet Union	17:52.0
12	Yuliya Shamshurina	Soviet Union	17:53.5
13	Blanka Paulů	Czechoslovakia	17:56.6
14	Nadezhda Burlakova	Soviet Union	17:58.7
15	Gabriela Svobodová	Czechoslovakia	17:59.8
16	Karin Lamberg-Skog	Sweden	18:02.5
17	Liliya Vasilchenko	Soviet Union	18:07.6
18	Petra Rohrmann	East Germany	18:09.4
19	Eija Hyytiäinen	Finland	18:11.6
20	Dagmar Švubová	Czechoslovakia	18:15.3
21	Carola Anding	East Germany	18:17.7
22	Marjo Matikainen	Finland	18:21.6
23	Ann Rosendahl	Sweden	18:22.8
24	Manuela Di Centa	Italy	18:24.9
24	Guidina Dal Sasso	Italy	18:24.9
26	Karin Thomas	Switzerland	18:30.4
27	Lynn Spencer-Galanes	United States	18:30.8
28	Shirley Firth	Canada	18:32.3
29	Sharon Firth	Canada	18:37.5
30	Judy Rabinowitz	United States	18:41.5
31	Clara Angerer	Italy	18:47.9
32	Livia Reit	Romania	18:51.6
33	Paola Pozzoni	Italy	18:51.9
34	Jana Mlakar	Yugoslavia	18:54.1
35	Christina Gilli-Brügger	Switzerland	18:56.2
36	Petra Voge	East Germany	19:16.6
37	Eva-Lena Karlsson	Sweden	19:21.6
38	Susan Long	United States	19:28.5
39	Angela Schmidt-Foster	Canada	19:30.1
40	Patricia Ross	United States	19:30.9
41	Andreja Smrekar	Yugoslavia	19:41.7
42	Monika Germann	Switzerland	19:42.0
43	Metka Munih	Yugoslavia	20:12.0
44	Ros Coats	Great Britain	20:16.7
45	Tatjana Smolnikar	Yugoslavia	20:21.8
46	Doris Trueman	Great Britain	21:05.6
47	Nicola Lavery	Great Britain	21:08.5
48	Dou Aixia	China	21:33.8
49	Tang Yuqin	China	21:41.5
50	Caroline Brittan	Great Britain	21:44.3
51	Chen Yufeng	China	21:50.2
52	Song Shiji	China	22:24.1
