= Dagmar Švubová =

Personal information
- Nationality: Czech Republic
- Born: Dagmar Palečková; 9 August 1958 (age 67) Nové Město na Moravě, Czechoslovakia

Sport
- Sport: Skiing

World Cup career
- Seasons: 4 – (1982, 1984–1986)
- Indiv. starts: 14
- Indiv. podiums: 0
- Team starts: 3
- Team podiums: 1
- Team wins: 0
- Overall titles: 0 – (14th in 1982)
Medal record
Women's cross-country skiing
Representing Czechoslovakia
Olympic Games
Silver medal – second place	1984 Sarajevo	4 × 5 km relay

Dagmar Švubová (née Palečková; born 9 August 1958) is a Czech former cross-country skier who competed for Czechoslovakia from 1982 to 1986. She won a silver medal in the 4 x 5 km relay at the 1984 Winter Olympics in Sarajevo.

Švubová's best individual finish was 5th at a 1982 World Cup event in Czechoslovakia.

== Cross-country skiing results ==
All results are sourced from the International Ski Federation (FIS).

=== Olympic Games ===
- 1 medal – (1 silver)

Year	Age	5 km	10 km	20 km	4 × 5 km relay
1980	21	13	16	—N/a	4
1984	25	20	—	—	2nd

=== World Championships ===
Year	Age	5 km	10 km	20 km	4 × 5 km relay
1978	19	20	11	14	6
1982	23	12	—	15	5
1985	26	—	25	20	5

=== World Cup ===
Season Standings
Season	Age	Overall
1982	23	14
1984	25	60
1985	26	19
1986	27	40

==== Team podiums ====
- 1 podium

No.	Season	Date	Location	Race	Level	Place	Teammates
1	1983–84	15 February 1984	(Socialist Federal Republic of Yugoslavia) Sarajevo, Yugoslavia	4 × 5 km Relay	Olympic Games (Note: Until the 1994 Olympics, Olympic races were included in the World Cup scoring system.)	2nd	Paulů / Svobodová / Jeriová
