= Tatjana Smolnikar =

Slovenian skier

Personal information
- Nationality: Slovenian
- Born: 2 December 1962 (age 63) Ljubljana, Yugoslavia

Sport
- Sport: Cross-country skiing

Tatjana Smolnikar (born 2 December 1962) is a Slovenian cross-country skier. She competed in three events at the 1984 Winter Olympics, representing Yugoslavia.

== Cross-country skiing results ==
=== Olympic Games ===
Year	Age	5 km	10 km	20 km	4 × 5 km relay
1984	21	45	44	—	10
