= Cross-country skiing at the 1984 Winter Olympics – Women's 10 kilometre =

Women's 10 km at the XIV Olympic Winter Games
- Cross-country skiing
- Venue: Igman
- Date: February 9, 1984
- Competitors: 52 from 15 nations
- Winning time: 31:44.2

Medalists
1st place, gold medalist(s)		Marja-Liisa Hämäläinen; Finland
2nd place, silver medalist(s)		Raisa Smetanina; Soviet Union
3rd place, bronze medalist(s)		Britt Pettersen; Norway

The 10 kilometre cross-country skiing event was the first event cross-country skiing programme to take place at the 1984 Winter Olympics, in Sarajevo, Yugoslavia. It was the ninth appearance of the 10 km race. The competition was held on Thursday, February 9, 1984 at Veliko Polje, Igman and was the first final to be held at the games.

Marja-Liisa Hämäläinen of Finland took Gold and was the second Finn to win this event after Lydia Wideman in 1952. The 1976 gold medal winner, Raisa Smetanina, won silver. All 52 athletes who entered the race finished with an official time.

== Results ==
Rank	Name	Country	Time
1	Marja-Liisa Hämäläinen	Finland	31:44.2
2	Raisa Smetanina	Soviet Union	32:02.9
3	Britt Pettersen	Norway	32:12.7
4	Berit Aunli	Norway	32:17.7
5	Anne Jahren	Norway	32:26.2
6	Marie Risby	Sweden	32:34.6
7	Marit Myrmæl	Norway	32:35.3
8	Yuliya Shamshurina	Soviet Union	32:45.7
9	Nadezhda Buryakova	Soviet Union	32:55.8
10	Květa Jeriová	Czechoslovakia	32:58.7
11	Evi Kratzer	Switzerland	33:04.8
12	Lyubov Lyadova	Soviet Union	33:05.8
13	Blanka Paulů	Czechoslovakia	33:07.8
14	Gabriela Svobodová	Czechoslovakia	33:29.1
15	Ute Noack	East Germany	33:37.5
16	Guidina Dal Sasso	Italy	33:48.2
17	Petra Rohrmann	East Germany	34:00.3
18	Karin Lamberg-Skog	Sweden	34:01.3
19	Pirkko Määttä	Finland	34:13.4
20	Christina Gilli-Brügger	Switzerland	34:17.8
21	Ann-Janeth Rosendahl	Sweden	34:28.0
22	Shirley Firth	Canada	34:31.3
23	Karin Thomas	Switzerland	34:31.6
24	Carola Anding	East Germany	34:33.3
25	Eija Hyytiäinen	Finland	34:33.8
26	Judy Rabinowitz	United States	34:35.1
27	Anna Pasiarová	Czechoslovakia	34:35.9
28	Manuela Di Centa	Italy	34:41.6
29	Sharon Firth	Canada	34:47.0
30	Jana Mlakar	Yugoslavia	34:52.2
31	Stina Karlsson	Sweden	34:52.4
32	Susan Long	United States	34:58.9
33	Karin Jäger	West Germany	35:05.2
34	Paola Pozzoni	Italy	35:30.8
35	Clara Angerer	Italy	35:31.1
36	Angela Schmidt-Foster	Canada	35:35.0
37	Erja Kuivalainen	Finland	35:35.2
38	Monika Germann	Switzerland	35:36.0
39	Patricia Ross	United States	35:41.3
40	Lynn Spencer-Galanes	United States	35:47.4
41	Andreja Smrekar	Yugoslavia	36:10.4
42	Livia Reit	Romania	36:20.9
43	Metka Munih	Yugoslavia	37:18.4
44	Tatjana Smolnikar	Yugoslavia	37:58.1
45	Ros Coats	Great Britain	38:12.2
46	Nicola Lavery	Great Britain	39:05.2
47	Doris Trueman	Great Britain	39:28.4
48	Lauren Jeffrey	Great Britain	40:11.2
49	Chen Yufeng	China	41:27.7
50	Dou Aixia	China	41:35.7
51	Zhang Changyun	China	42:26.6
52	Song Shiji	China	42:28.1
