= Nadesha Burlakova =

Soviet cross-country skier

Nadezhda Burlakova
Personal information
- Nationality: Russia
- Born: 17 February 1959 (age 67) Tabashino, Soviet Union

Sport
- Sport: Skiing

World Cup career
- Seasons: 1984, 1987
- Indiv. starts: 6
- Indiv. podiums: 0
- Team starts: 2
- Team podiums: 1
- Team wins: 0
- Overall titles: 0 – (14th in 1984)

Nadezhda Burlakova (born 17 February 1959) is a Soviet cross-country skier who competed from 1984 to 1986. At the 1984 Winter Olympics, she finished fourth in the 4 × 5 km relay, ninth in the 10 km, and 14th in the 5 km events.

Burlakova's best World Cup finish was fourth in a 5 km event in Finland in 1984.

== Cross-country skiing results ==
All results are sourced from the International Ski Federation (FIS).

=== Olympic Games ===
Year	Age	5 km	10 km	20 km	4 × 5 km relay
1984	25	14	9	—	4

=== World Cup ===
==== Season standings ====
Season	Age	Overall
1984	25	14
1987	28	52

==== Team podiums ====
- 1 podium

No.	Season	Date	Location	Race	Level	Place	Teammates
1	1983–84	26 February 1984	Falun, Sweden	4 × 5 km Relay	World Cup	3rd	Markashanskaya / Zimyatova / Smetanina
