= Andreja Smrekar =

Slovenian cross-country skier

Personal information
- Nationality: Slovenian
- Born: 30 July 1967 (age 58) Ljubljana, Yugoslavia

Sport
- Sport: Cross-country skiing

Andreja Smrekar (born 30 July 1967) is a Slovenian cross-country skier. She competed in three events at the 1984 Winter Olympics, representing Yugoslavia.

== Cross-country skiing results ==
=== Olympic Games ===
Year	Age	5 km	10 km	20 km	4 × 5 km relay
1984	16	41	41	—	10
