= Petra Rohrmann =

East German cross-country skier (born 1962)

Personal information
- Nationality: Germany
- Born: 30 July 1962 (age 63) Zella-Mehlis, East Germany

Sport
- Sport: Skiing
- Club: SC Motor Zella-Mehlis

World Cup career
- Seasons: 2 – (1983–1984)
- Indiv. starts: 7
- Indiv. podiums: 0
- Team starts: 1
- Team podiums: 0
- Overall titles: 0 – (24th in 1983)

Petra Rohrmann (born 30 July 1962 in Zella-Mehlis, Bezirk Suhl) is an East German cross-country skier who competed from 1983 to 1984. At the 1984 Winter Olympics in Sarajevo, she finished eighth in the 4 × 5 km relay and had her best individual finish was 17th in the 10 km event at those same games.

Rohrmann's best World Cup career finish was seventh in a 20 km event in the Soviet Union in 1983.

== Cross-country skiing results ==
All results are sourced from the International Ski Federation (FIS).

=== Olympic Games ===
Year	Age	5 km	10 km	20 km	4 × 5 km relay
1984	22	18	17	20	8

=== World Cup ===
==== Season standings ====
Season	Age	Overall
1983	21	24
1984	22	45
