= Patricia Ross =

American cross-country skier (born 1959)

Personal information
- Nationality: United States
- Born: March 8, 1959 (age 67) Middlebury, Vermont, United States

Sport
- Sport: Skiing

World Cup career
- Seasons: 1 – (1984)
- Indiv. starts: 3
- Indiv. podiums: 0
- Team starts: 1
- Team podiums: 0
- Overall titles: 0

Patricia Ross (born 8 March 1959 in Middlebury, Vermont) is an American former cross-country skier who competed from 1982 to 1984. She attended the University of New Hampshire and skied for the 'Cats. She graduated in 1982 with a degree in physical education.

Ross finished seventh in the 4 × 5 km relay at the 1984 Winter Olympics in Sarajevo.

After retiring, she became a real estate broker in upstate New York.

== Cross-country skiing results ==
=== Olympic Games ===
Year	Age	5 km	10 km	20 km	4 × 5 km relay
1984	24	40	39	—	7

=== World Cup ===
==== Season standings ====
Season	Age	Overall
1984	24	NC
