= Charles MacIvor =

Charles MacIvor may refer to:

- Charles MacIvor (rugby union) (1891–1913), Irish rugby union player
- Charles MacIvor (skier) (born 1957), British cross-country skier and biathlete

== See also ==
- Charles Duncan McIver (1860–1906), founder and first president of The University of North Carolina at Greensboro
