= REIT (disambiguation) =

REIT or Reit may refer to:

== People ==
- Livia Reit (born 1960), Romanian skier at the 1984 Olympics
- Seymour Reit (1918–2001), American author of children's books (possibly created Casper the Friendly Ghost)
- Ursula Reit (1914–1998), German actress

== Other uses ==
- Real estate investment trust, a type of company
- REIT India, company, produces communications technology
- Reit im Winkl, village in Bavaria
