= Ann Rosendahl =

Swedish cross-country skier

Personal information
- Nationality: Sweden
- Born: 20 July 1959 (age 66) Örebro, Sweden

Sport
- Sport: Skiing

World Cup career
- Seasons: 3 – (1982–1984)
- Indiv. starts: 11
- Indiv. podiums: 0
- Team starts: 1
- Team podiums: 0
- Overall titles: 0 – (24th in 1984)

Ann-Janeth Rosendahl (born 20 July 1959) is a retired Swedish cross-country skier who competed in the early 1980s. She finished fifth in the 4 × 5 km relay at the 1984 Winter Olympics in Sarajevo.

== Cross-country skiing results ==
=== Olympic Games ===
Year	Age	5 km	10 km	20 km	4 × 5 km relay
1984	24	23	21	23	5

=== World Cup ===
==== Season standings ====
Season	Age	Overall
1982	22	NC
1983	23	27
1984	24	24
