= Marie Risby =

Swedish cross-country skier

Personal information
- Full name: Lillemor Marie Risby
- Nationality: Sweden
- Born: 20 April 1955 (age 71) Ludvika, Sweden

Sport
- Sport: Skiing
- Club: Ludvika FFI

World Cup career
- Seasons: 3 – (1983–1985)
- Indiv. starts: 19
- Indiv. podiums: 4
- Indiv. wins: 1
- Team starts: 2
- Team podiums: 1
- Team wins: 0
- Overall titles: 0 – (6th in 1984)

Marie Risby (born 20 April 1955) is a Swedish cross-country skier who competed during the 1970s and 80's. She participated in three Winter Olympics (1976, 1980 and 1984) and did her best results at the 1984 Winter Olympics in Sarajevo, when she finished fourth in the 5 km, fifth in the 20 km, fifth in the 4 × 5 km relay, and sixth in the 10 km events.

At the 1985 FIS Nordic World Ski Championships in Seefeld, Risby finished sixth in the 20 km and tenth in the 10 km events. Her lone World Cup victory was in a 5 km event in Finland in 1985, her last year as an active athlete.

== Cross-country skiing results ==
All results are sourced from the International Ski Federation (FIS).

=== Olympic Games ===
Year	Age	5 km	10 km	20 km	4 × 5 km relay
1976	20	—	21	—N/a	4
1980	24	11	15	—N/a	6
1984	28	4	6	5	5

=== World Championships ===
Year	Age	5 km	10 km	20 km	4 × 5 km relay
1978	22	—	21	17	4
1982	26	18	6	7	6
1985	29	10	10	6	7

=== World Cup ===
==== Season standings ====
Season	Age	Overall
1982	27	10
1983	28	10
1984	29	6
1985	30	8

==== Individual podiums ====
- 1 victory
- 4 podiums

No.	Season	Date	Location	Race	Level	Place
1	1982–83	8 January 1983	Klingenthal, East Germany	10 km Individual	World Cup	2nd
2	1983–84	25 February 1984	Falun, Sweden	10 km Individual	World Cup	2nd
3	1983–84	3 March 1984	Lahti, Finland	5 km Individual	World Cup	3rd
4	1984–85	2 March 1985	Lahti, Finland	5 km Individual	World Cup	1st

==== Team podiums ====
- 1 podium

No.	Season	Date	Location	Race	Level	Place	Teammates
1	1984–85	10 March 1985	Falun, Sweden	4 × 5 km Relay	World Cup	2nd	Johansson / Fritzon / Lamberg-Skog
