= Lynn Spencer-Galanes =

American cross-country skier (born 1954)

Personal information
- Nationality: United States
- Born: June 6, 1954 (age 72) Anchorage, Alaska, United States

Sport
- Sport: Skiing

World Cup career
- Seasons: 3 – (1982–1984)
- Indiv. starts: 9
- Indiv. podiums: 0
- Team starts: 1
- Team podiums: 0
- Overall titles: 0 – (31st in 1983)

Margaret Lynn von der Heide Spencer (born June 6, 1954, in Anchorage, Alaska) is a former, American cross-country skier who competed from 1975 to 1984. She finished seventh in the 4 × 5 km relay at the 1984 Winter Olympics in Sarajevo.

Spencer-Galanes' best World Cup career finish was ninth in a 10 km event in Canada in 1983.

== Cross-country skiing results ==
All results are sourced from the International Ski Federation (FIS).

=== Olympic Games ===
Year	Age	5 km	10 km	20 km	4 × 5 km relay
1976	21	DNF	—	—N/a	—
1980	25	—	31	—N/a	7
1984	29	27	40	33	7

=== World Championships ===
Year	Age	5 km	10 km	20 km	4 × 5 km relay
1978	23	25	25	26	8

=== World Cup ===
==== Season standings ====
Season	Age	Overall
1982	27	43
1983	28	31
1984	29	NC
