= Evalena =

Evalena, Eva-Lena, or Eva Lena are feminine given names. People with the name include:

- Eva-Lena Gustavsson (born 1956), Swedish politician
- Evalena Fryer Hedley (1865–1943), American journalist, editor, and author
- Eva-Lena Jansson (born 1963), Swedish politician
- Eva-Lena Karlsson (born 1961), Swedish cross-country skier
- Eva-Lena Lundgren (born 1961), Swedish model and beauty pageant titleholder
- Eva Lena Olsson (born 1969), Swedish tennis player

== See also ==
- Eva (name)
- Lena (name)
