= Gabriela Svobodová =

Slovak-Czech cross-country skier (born 1953)

Personal information
- Nationality: Slovakia
- Born: 27 February 1953 (age 73) Kremnica, Czechoslovakia

Sport
- Sport: Skiing

World Cup career
- Seasons: 3 – (1982–1984)
- Indiv. starts: 14
- Indiv. podiums: 1
- Indiv. wins: 0
- Team starts: 3
- Team podiums: 1
- Team wins: 0
- Overall titles: 0 – (13th in 1982)
Medal record
Women's cross-country skiing
Representing Czechoslovakia
Olympic Games
Silver medal – second place	1984 Sarajevo	4 × 5 km relay
World Championships
Bronze medal – third place	1974 Falun	4 × 5 km relay

Gabriela Svobodová (born Sekajová on 27 February 1953) is a Slovak-Czech former cross-country skier who competed for Czechoslovakia during the 1970s until 1984. She won a silver medal in the 4 × 5 km relay at the 1984 Winter Olympics in Sarajevo and a bronze medal in the same event at the 1974 FIS Nordic World Ski Championships.

Svobodová is the mother of Gabriela Soukalová, a biathlete competing for the Czech national team.

== Cross-country skiing results ==
All results are sourced from the International Ski Federation (FIS).

=== Olympic Games ===
- 1 medal – (1 silver)

Year	Age	5 km	10 km	20 km	4 × 5 km relay
1976	22	13	19	—N/a	6
1980	26	20	19	—N/a	4
1984	30	15	14	—	Silver

=== World Championships ===
- 1 medal – (1 bronze)

Year	Age	5 km	10 km	20 km	4 × 5 km relay
1974	20	—	—	—N/a	Bronze
1982	28	—	13	—	5
1985	31	—	27	—	5

=== World Cup ===
==== Season standings ====
Season	Age	Overall
1982	28	13
1983	29	33
1984	30	20

==== Individual podiums ====
- 1 podium

No.	Season	Date	Location	Race	Level	Place
1	1981–82	22 January 1982	Furtwangen, West Germany	5 km Individual	World Cup	2nd

==== Team podiums ====
- 1 podium

No.	Season	Date	Location	Race	Level	Place	Teammates
1	1983–84	15 February 1984	(Socialist Federal Republic of Yugoslavia) Sarajevo, Yugoslavia	4 × 5 km Relay	Olympic Games^{[1]}	2nd	Palečková-Švubová / Paulů / Jeriová

Note: ^{1} Until the 1994 Olympics, Olympic races were included in the World Cup scoring system.
