= Susan Long (skier) =

American cross-country skier (born 1960)

Sue Long
Personal information
- Full name: Susan Deborah Long
- Nationality: United States
- Born: April 4, 1960 (age 66) Glen Ridge, New Jersey, U.S.

Sport
- Sport: Skiing

World Cup career
- Seasons: 3 – (1983–1985)
- Indiv. starts: 12
- Indiv. podiums: 0
- Team starts: 1
- Team podiums: 0
- Overall titles: 0 – (32nd in 1984)

Susan Deborah Long (born April 4, 1960, in Glen Ridge, New Jersey) is an American cross-country skier who competed from 1983 to 1986. She finished seventh in the 4 × 5 km relay at the 1984 Winter Olympics in Sarajevo.

Long finished 17th in the 20 km event at the 1985 FIS Nordic World Ski Championships in Seefeld. Her best World Cup finish was 11th in a 5 km event in Czechoslovakia in 1984. She also competed collegiately at Middlebury College.

== Cross-country skiing results ==
All results are sourced from the International Ski Federation (FIS).

=== Olympic Games ===
| Year | Age | 5 km | 10 km | 20 km | 4 × 5 km relay |
|---|---|---|---|---|---|
| 1984 | 23 | 38 | 32 | 28 | 7 |

=== World Championships ===
| Year | Age | 5 km | 10 km | 20 km | 4 × 5 km relay |
|---|---|---|---|---|---|
| 1985 | 24 | — | — | 17 | — |

=== World Cup ===
==== Season standings ====
| Season | Age | Overall |
|---|---|---|
| 1983 | 22 | 45 |
| 1984 | 23 | 32 |
| 1985 | 24 | 48 |
