= Metka Munih =

Slovenian cross-country skier

Personal information
- Nationality: Slovenian
- Born: 23 April 1959 (age 66) Ljubljana, Yugoslavia

Sport
- Sport: Cross-country skiing

Metka Munih (born 23 April 1959) is a Slovenian cross-country skier. She competed in four events at the 1984 Winter Olympics, representing Yugoslavia.

== Cross-country skiing results ==
=== Olympic Games ===
Year	Age	5 km	10 km	20 km	4 × 5 km relay
1984	24	43	43	38	10
