= Judy Rabinowitz =

American cross-country skier (born 1958)

Personal information
- Nationality: United States
- Born: April 9, 1959 (age 67) Fairbanks, Alaska, United States

Sport
- Sport: Skiing
- Club: Harvard Crimson Ski Team

World Cup career
- Seasons: 2 – (1983–1984)
- Indiv. starts: 12
- Indiv. podiums: 0
- Team starts: 1
- Team podiums: 0
- Overall titles: 0 – (20th in 1983)

Judy Rabinowitz (born April 9, 1958, in Fairbanks, Alaska) is an American cross-country skier who competed from 1982 to 1984. She finished seventh in the 4 × 5 km relay at the 1984 Winter Olympics in Sarajevo.

Rabinowitz's best World Cup career finish was ninth in a 10 km event in the United States in 1983.

She graduated from Harvard University and Harvard Law School.

== Cross-country skiing results ==
All results are sourced from the International Ski Federation (FIS).

=== Olympic Games ===
Year	Age	5 km	10 km	20 km	4 × 5 km relay
1984	24	30	26	27	7

=== World Cup ===
==== Season standings ====
Season	Age	Overall
1983	23	20
1984	24	55
