= Monika Germann =

Swiss cross-country skier

Personal information
- Nationality: Switzerland
- Born: April 23, 1954 (age 72) Adelboden, Switzerland

Sport
- Sport: Skiing

World Cup career
- Seasons: 1 – (1984)
- Indiv. starts: 3
- Indiv. podiums: 0
- Team starts: 1
- Team podiums: 0
- Overall titles: 0

Monika Germann (born April 23, 1954) is a former Swiss cross-country skier who competed in the early 1980s. She finished sixth in the 4 × 5 km relay at the 1984 Winter Olympics in Sarajevo.

== Cross-country skiing results ==
=== Olympic Games ===
Year	Age	5 km	10 km	20 km	4 × 5 km relay
1984	29	42	38	34	6
