= Květa Jeriová =

Czech ski runner and educator

- Květoslava Jeriová in 2021

Personal information
- Nationality: Czech Republic
- Born: 10 October 1956 (age 70) Studenec, Czechoslovakia
- Spouse: Zdeněk Pecka

Sport
- Sport: Skiing
- Club: SNC Rudá Hvězda Jablonec

World Cup career
- Seasons: 3 – (1982–1984)
- Indiv. starts: 27
- Indiv. podiums: 10
- Indiv. wins: 8
- Team starts: 2
- Team podiums: 1
- Team wins: 0
- Overall titles: 0 – (3rd in 1982, 1983 )
Medal record
Women's cross-country skiing
Representing Czechoslovakia
Olympic Games
Silver medal – second place	1984 Sarajevo	4 × 5 km relay
Bronze medal – third place	1980 Lake Placid	5 km
Bronze medal – third place	1984 Sarajevo	5 km
World Championships
Bronze medal – third place	1982 Oslo	10 km

Květoslava Jeriová-Pecková (Czech pronunciation: [ˈkvjɛtoslava ˈjɛrɪjovaː ˈpɛtskovaː]; alternatively also Květa Jeriová-Pecková; born Květoslava Jeriová, 10 October 1956) is a former Czech cross-country skier. She competed from 1980 to 1984. She won three medals at the Winter Olympics with a silver at the 4 × 5 km relay (1984) and two bronzes in the 5 km (1980, 1984). Jeriová was the most successful Czech woman cross-country skier until Kateřina Neumannová came along in the 1990s.

She also won a bronze medal in the 10 km at the 1982 FIS Nordic World Ski Championships and won a total of eight World cup events during her short career.

Jeriová also won the 5 km event at the Holmenkollen ski festival in 1981.

== Personal life ==
She was married to Zdeněk Pecka until his death on 30 January 2024.

== Cross-country skiing results ==
All results are sourced from the International Ski Federation (FIS).

=== Olympic Games ===
- 3 medals – (1 silver, 2 bronze)

Year	Age	5 km	10 km	20 km	4 × 5 km relay
1980	23	3rd	9	—N/a	4
1984	27	3rd	10	12	2nd

=== World Championships ===
- 1 medal – (1 bronze)

Year	Age	5 km	10 km	20 km	4 × 5 km relay
1978	21	22	22	—	6
1982	25	5	3rd	—	5

=== World Cup ===
Season Standings
Season	Age	Overall
1982	25	3rd
1983	26	3rd
1984	27	4

==== Individual podiums ====
- 8 victories
- 10 podiums

No.	Season	Date	Location	Race	Level	Place
1	1981–82	9 January 1982	Klingenthal, East Germany	10 km Individual	World Cup	1st
2	1981–82	15 January 1982	La Bresse, France	5 km Individual	World Cup	1st
3	1981–82	22 January 1982	Furtwangen, West Germany	5 km Individual	World Cup	1st
4	1981–82	19 January 1982	Oslo, Norway	10 km Individual	World Championships^{[1]}	3rd
5	1982–83	12 December 1982	Val di Sole, Italy	5 km Individual	World Cup	1st
6	1982–83	19 February 1983	Kavgolovo, Soviet Union	20 km Individual	World Cup	1st
7	1982–83	25 February 1983	Falun, Sweden	10 km Individual	World Cup	1st
8	1983–84	9 December 1983	Reit im Winkl, West Germany	5 km Individual	World Cup	1st
9	1983–84	12 February 1984	(Socialist Federal Republic of Yugoslavia) Sarajevo, Yugoslavia	5 km Individual	Olympic Games^{[1]}	3rd
10	1983–84	17 March 1984	Štrbské Pleso, Czechoslovakia	5 km Individual	World Cup	1st

==== Team podiums ====
- 1 podium

No.	Season	Date	Location	Race	Level	Place	Teammates
1	1983–84	15 February 1984	(Socialist Federal Republic of Yugoslavia) Sarajevo, Yugoslavia	4 × 5 km Relay	Olympic Games (Note: Until the 1999 World Championships and the 1994 Olympics, World Championship and Olympic races were included in the World Cup scoring system.)	2nd	Švubová / Paulů / Svobodová
