= Jammu Suraksha Yojana =

- Jammu Suraksha Yojana
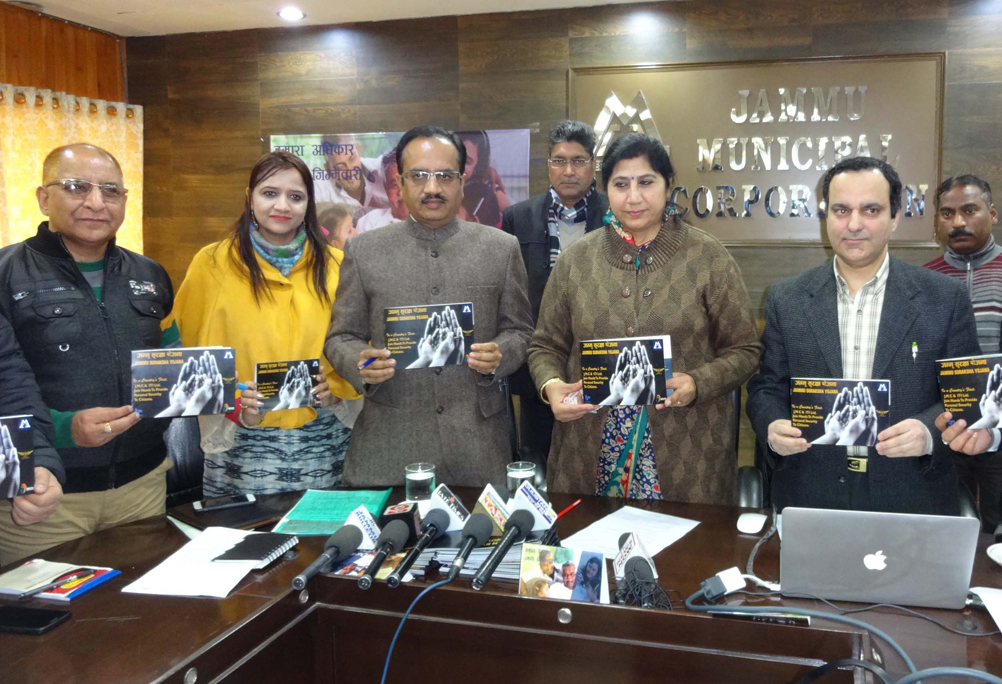
- Type of project: Public Safety
- Location: Jammu, Jammu & Kashmir
- Country: India
- Prime Minister(s): Narendra Modi
- Key people: Purnima Sharma, Pankaj Magotra KAS, ITI Limited
- Launched: 3 January 2019; 7 years ago Jammu
- Status: Active

Jammu Suraksha Yojana is a collaborative initiative by REIT under Indian Telephone Industries Limited and the Jammu municipal corporation. It began as a way to provide digital security and surveillance products to the citizens of Jammu at subsidized prices. They may also receive life insurance reimbursements of up to Rs 1,00,000 in case of death.

Jammu Suraksha Yojana is the first initiative taken by a government department for general public security. It was launched by JMC Deputy Mayor Purnima Sharma, JMC Commissioner Pankaj Magotra KAS and officials from ITI Limited.

== The Scheme ==
Jammu Suraksha Yojana is initiated to secure the citizens of Jammu and to provide subsidized security solutions so that to make security affordable for the general public. Under Jammu Suraksha Yojana, the subscriber will get security services like Personal Security, Financial Security, and Civil Security. The subscriber has to pay Rs. 500 monthly and GST as applicable to avail Jammu Suraksha Yojana Scheme.

=== Personal Security ===
Jammu Municipal Corporation has taken a step further to secure every citizen of Jammu. In personal security, the subscriber will get:

1. High definition indoor camera and outdoor camera based on Artificial Intelligence.
2. The subscriber will also get two sets of Electro-magnetic waves based Wireless Door Sensors.

=== Financial Security ===
The main motive to provide financial security to the citizen of Jammu is to stabilize the financial condition of the citizen in case of mishappening. In financial security, the subscriber will have life insurance cover up to Rs. 1,00,000 in case of Death.

=== Civil Security (SOS Alert) ===
REIT has introduced an SOS Alert application for Citizens of India to provide instant security and rescue help during criminal or civil incidents. When a person feels any kind of discomfort or insecurity or teasing on public or private places, he/she has to press the SOS Button and the application will start and send all details like Name, Phone number, Address, live Location and other required details to Police control Room and a police officer will be assigned to rescue the person within seconds according to the application prototype. Besides, the REIT SOS Alert app will also provide a free self-defense course to the needy to defend himself/herself in public and private places.

== Services ==
- 2 Door sensors
- 2 sets of electromagnetic waves Wireless door sensor
- Artificial Intelligence High Definition Indoor Camera
- Cloud Monitoring
- Dedicated Customer Support
- Digital Security
- Financial support to the family in case of subscriber death and insurance up to 1 lacs.
- High Definition Outdoor camera
- High definition recording
- Immediate SOS alert to the Family and Civil Police
- Online view
- The recording time of 10-35 days
- Theft alert

== REIT Suvidha Centers ==
REIT India, under ITI Limited in collaboration with Jammu Municipal Corporation, has started various REIT Suvidha Centers to facilitate the subscribers. The REIT Suvidha Centers are started in every municipal ward of Jammu city. The applicant will have to visit the REIT Suvidha centers to avail government Scheme.
