= Blanka Paulů =

Czech cross-country skier

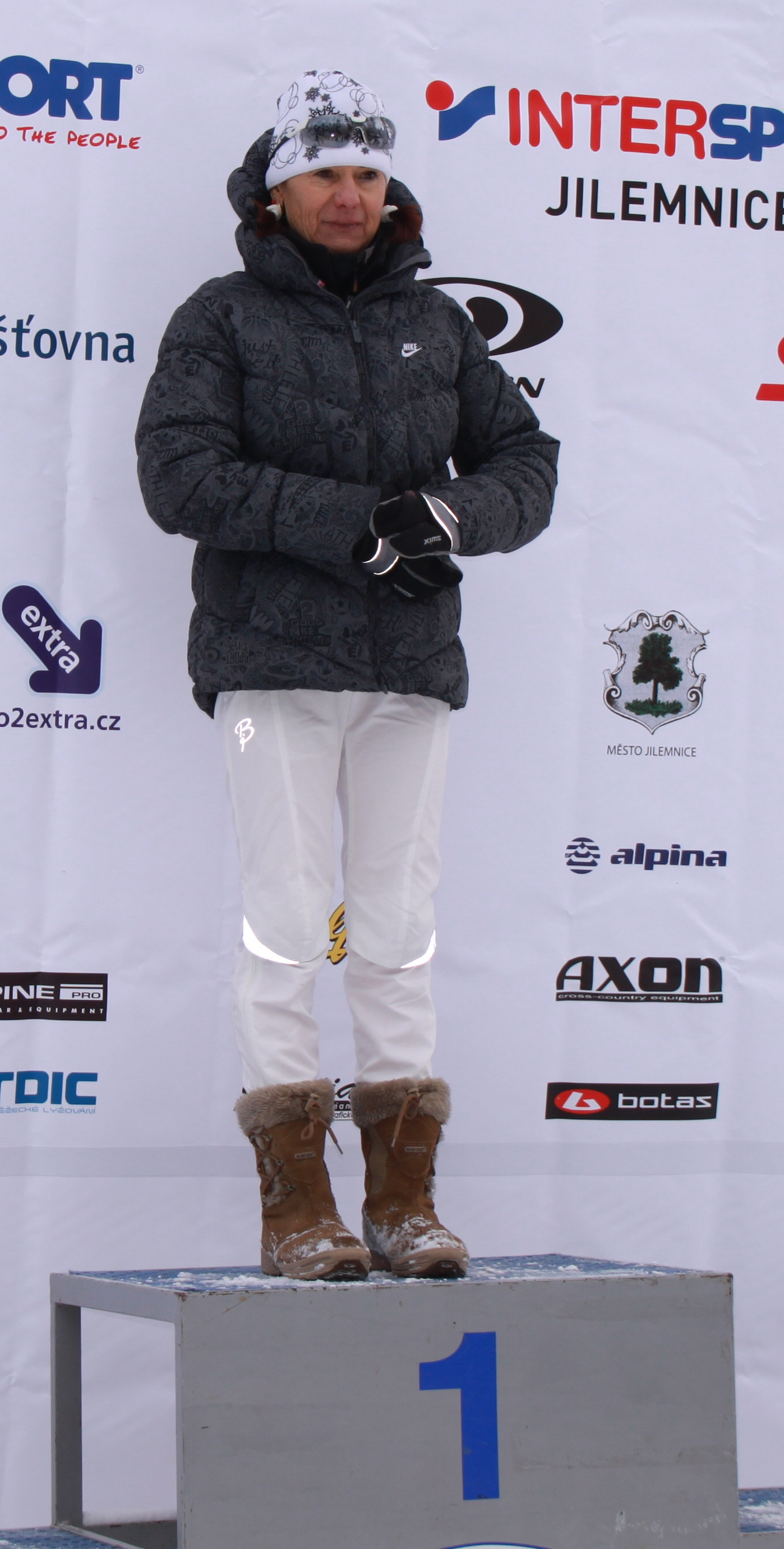

Personal information
- Nationality: Czech Republic
- Born: March 31, 1954 (age 72) Vrchlabí, Czechoslovakia

Sport
- Sport: Skiing

World Cup career
- Seasons: 4 – (1982–1985)
- Indiv. starts: 26
- Indiv. podiums: 7
- Indiv. wins: 2
- Team starts: 1
- Team podiums: 1
- Team wins: 0
- Overall titles: 0 – (4th in 1983)
Medal record
Women's cross-country skiing
Representing Czechoslovakia
Olympic Games
Silver medal – second place	1984 Sarajevo	4 × 5 km relay
World Championships
Silver medal – second place	1974 Falun	5 km
Bronze medal – third place	1974 Falun	4 × 5 km relay

Blanka Paulů (born March 31, 1954) is a former Czech cross-country skier who competed during the 1970s and 1980s. She won a silver medal in the 4 × 5 km relay at the 1984 Winter Olympics in Sarajevo and finished fourth in the 20 km at those same games.

Paulů also won two medals at the 1974 FIS Nordic World Ski Championships with a silver in the 5 km and a bronze in the 4 × 5 km relay. She also had two individual victories in her career (10 km: 1982, 5 km: 1983).

== Cross-country skiing results ==
All results are sourced from the International Ski Federation (FIS).

=== Olympic Games ===
- 1 medal – (1 silver)

Year	Age	5 km	10 km	20 km	4 × 5 km relay
1976	21	10	17	—N/a	6
1980	25	30	29	—N/a	4
1984	29	13	13	4	2nd

=== World Championships ===
- 2 medals – (1 silver, 1 bronze)

Year	Age	5 km	10 km	20 km	4 × 5 km relay
1974	19	2nd	4	—N/a	3rd
1978	23	13	10	19	6
1982	27	—	—	16	—
1985	29	—	—	19	—

=== World Cup ===
Season Standings
Season	Age	Overall
1982	27	7
1983	28	4
1984	29	11
1985	30	39

==== Individual podiums ====
- 2 victories
- 7 podiums

No.	Season	Date	Location	Race	Level	Place
1	1981–82	22 January 1982	Furtwangen, West Germany	5 km Individual	World Cup	3rd
2	1981–82	28 March 1982	Štrbské Pleso, Czechoslovakia	10 km Individual	World Cup	1st
3	1982–83	12 December 1982	Val di Sole, Italy	5 km Individual	World Cup	3rd
4	1982–83	8 January 1983	Klingenthal, East Germany	10 km Individual	World Cup	3rd
5	1982–83	14 January 1983	Stachy, Czechoslovakia	10 km Individual	World Cup	3rd
6	1982–83	10 February 1983	(Socialist Federal Republic of Yugoslavia) Igman, Yugoslavia	10 km Individual	World Cup	1st
7	1982–83	27 March 1983	Labrador City, Canada	10 km Individual	World Cup	2nd

==== Team podiums ====
- 1 podium

No.	Season	Date	Location	Race	Level	Place	Teammates
1	1983–84	15 February 1984	(Socialist Federal Republic of Yugoslavia) Sarajevo, Yugoslavia	4 × 5 km Relay	Olympic Games (Note: Until the 1994 Olympics, Olympic races were included in the World Cup scoring system.)	2nd	Palečková-Švubová / Svobodová / Jeriová
