= Mike McLeod (athlete) =

British distance runner (born 1952)

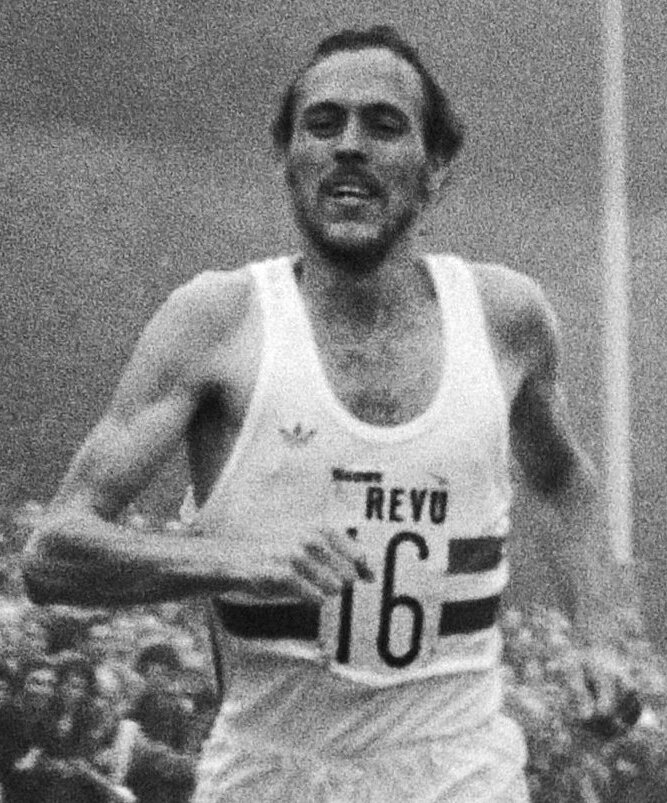
- McLeod in 1977

Personal information
- Nationality: British (English)
- Born: 25 January 1952 (age 74) Dilston, Northumberland, England
- Height: 180 cm (5 ft 11 in)
- Weight: 63 kg (139 lb)

Sport
- Club: Elswick Harriers, Newcastle upon Tyne
Medal record
Men's athletics
Representing Great Britain
Olympic Games
Silver medal – second place	1984 Los Angeles	10,000 metres
Representing England
Commonwealth Games
Bronze medal – third place	1978 Edmonton	10,000 metres

Michael James McLeod (born 25 January 1952) is a British former athlete who competed mainly in the 10,000 metres. He competed in three Olympic Games.

== Biography ==
McLeod competed for Great Britain in the 1984 Summer Olympics held in Los Angeles in the 10,000 metres where he won the silver medal. He only finished third but second placed Martti Vainio had been disqualified for taking anabolic steroids. Race winner Alberto Cova has since admitted to using blood transfusions during his career, and there has been speculation that McLeod could and should therefore be eventually awarded the gold medal.

McLeod ran for Elswick Harriers of Newcastle upon Tyne from an early age winning many races on a regional, national and international scale. One of his teammates at schoolboy level was Sting (musician). One of his greatest achievements was being presented with an Olympic silver medal at the Los Angeles Olympic Games in 1984, the best performance by a British athlete at that time. Twice winner of the Golden 10,000 metre which seems to be now known as the world championships. McLeod won the Morpeth to Newcastle road race on five occasions with 63 minutes and 25 seconds being his best time in 1980. He won the Saltwell Harriers 10k road race 17 years in a row. McLeod also won the first Great North Run and went on to win it again the following year. He competed abroad and won the Giro al Sas 10K race in Italy in 1984.

McLeod represented England and won a bronze medal in the 10,000 metres event at the 1978 Commonwealth Games in Canada.

Four years later he represented England, once again in the 10,000 metres event, at the 1982 Commonwealth Games in Australia. A third Commonwealth Games appearance arrived in 1986 when he represented England at the 1986 Commonwealth Games in Scotland.

McLeod finished runner-up at the AAA Championships on four occasions in 1978, 1984 and 1988 over 10,000 metres and in 1979 over 5,000 metres. By virtue of being the highest placed British athlete in the 5,000 metres (1979) he was considered the British 5,000 metres champion

== Personal life ==
McLeod's son Ryan is now a professional runner. McLeod is his coach. His brother is Olympian Tony McLeod.

== Business activities ==
McLeod is owner/director of Abacus Printers, based in Gateshead. He is also President of Future Sport NE, a charity supporting young people in sport in the North East of England.
