= REIT India =

Subsidiary of Indian Telephone Industries Ltd

REIT
- Trade name: REIT Security Council of India
- Native name: REIT India
- Type: Subsidiary of Indian Telephone Industries Limited
- Industry: Security & surveillance
- Founded: 2017
- Headquarters: Bangalore, India
- Area served: PAN India
- Products: Security & surveillance products
- Services: Surveillance, Smart School, Jammu Suraksha Yojana, GPS Tracking
- Parent: Indian Telephone Industries Limited (100%)
- Divisions: Jammu, Amritsar
- Website: reitindia.org

REIT or REIT India, is a wholly owned subsidiary of Indian Telephone Industries Limited (ITI Limited), India's first public sector unit under the Ministry of Communications.

== Products and services ==
=== Cameras ===
REIT provides surveillance cameras in both wired and Wireless configurations. Surveillance cameras can be accessed remotely on computers, smartphones, and tablets.

=== GPS tracking ===
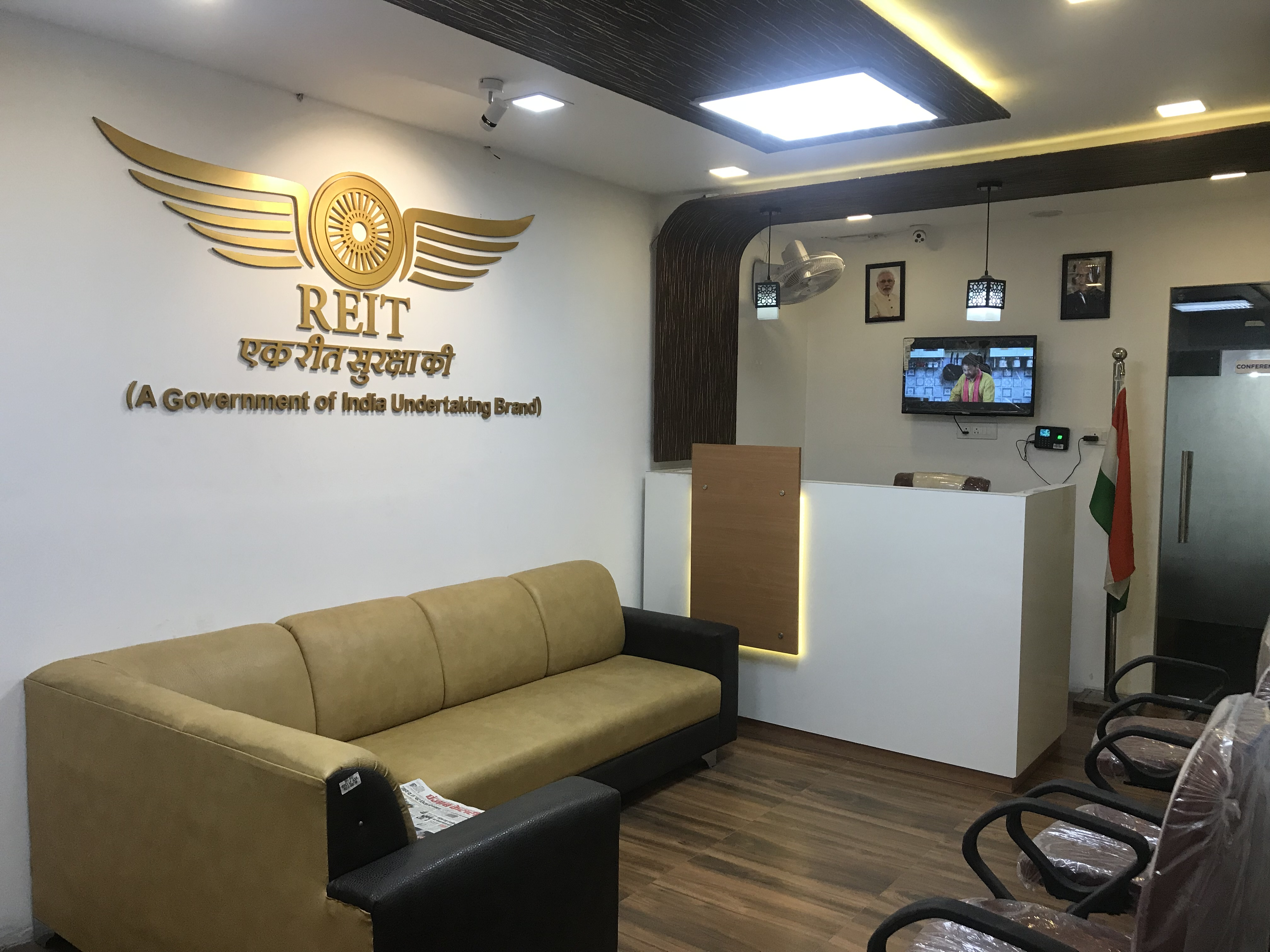
Office of REIT India

REIT created a web-enabled "GPS tracking system" to monitor devices, vehicles, cargo containers, and children.

=== Information technology ===
REIT has deployed the Internet of things (IoT) to create safe cities, homes, and businesses by remotely monitoring private and public places using smart surveillance devices.

Other services provided by REIT for corporate and government organizations are cloud computing, customized software, database security, IT maintenance, and technical assistance.

== Other programs ==
=== Jammu Suraksha Yojana ===
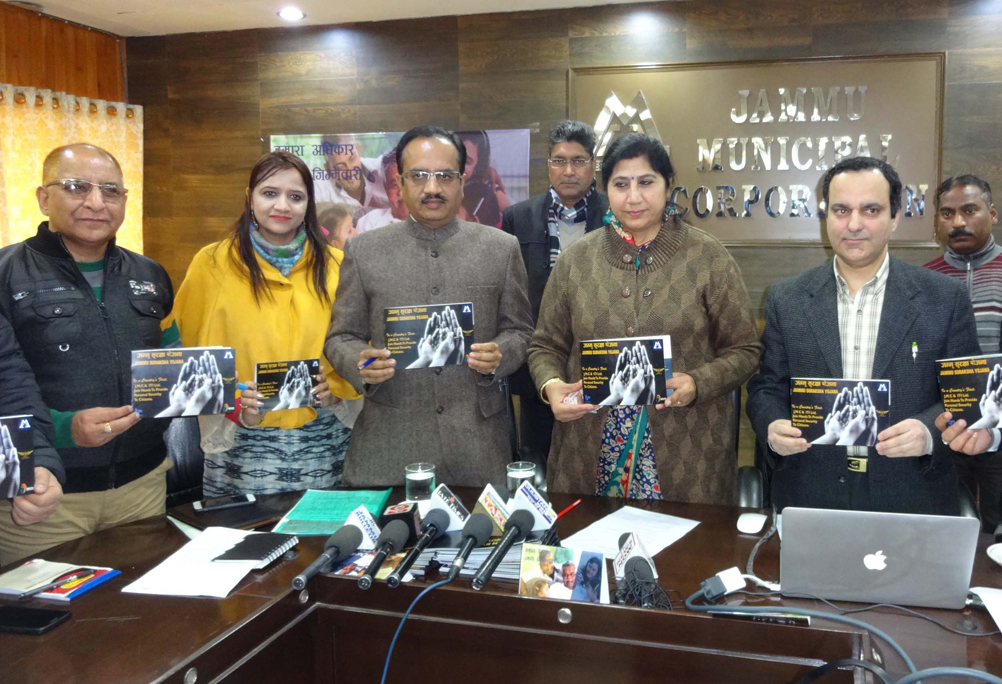

Jammu Municipal Corporation is the first government body in the world concerning personal security of citizens. Jammu Suraksha Yojana is a collaborative initiative by REIT under ITI Limited and Jammu Municipal Corporation. It is intended to provide digital security and surveillance products to the citizen of Jammu at subsidized prices. The citizens can also avail life insurance in case of death.

=== Smart School ===
REIT's Smart School program helps schools in India to upgrade their technology, including smart classrooms, broadcast systems for every class, digital entry at reception, integrated control rooms in campus, Wi-Fi campus, and school management Software.
