= Raisa Smetanina =

Russian cross-country skier (born 1952)

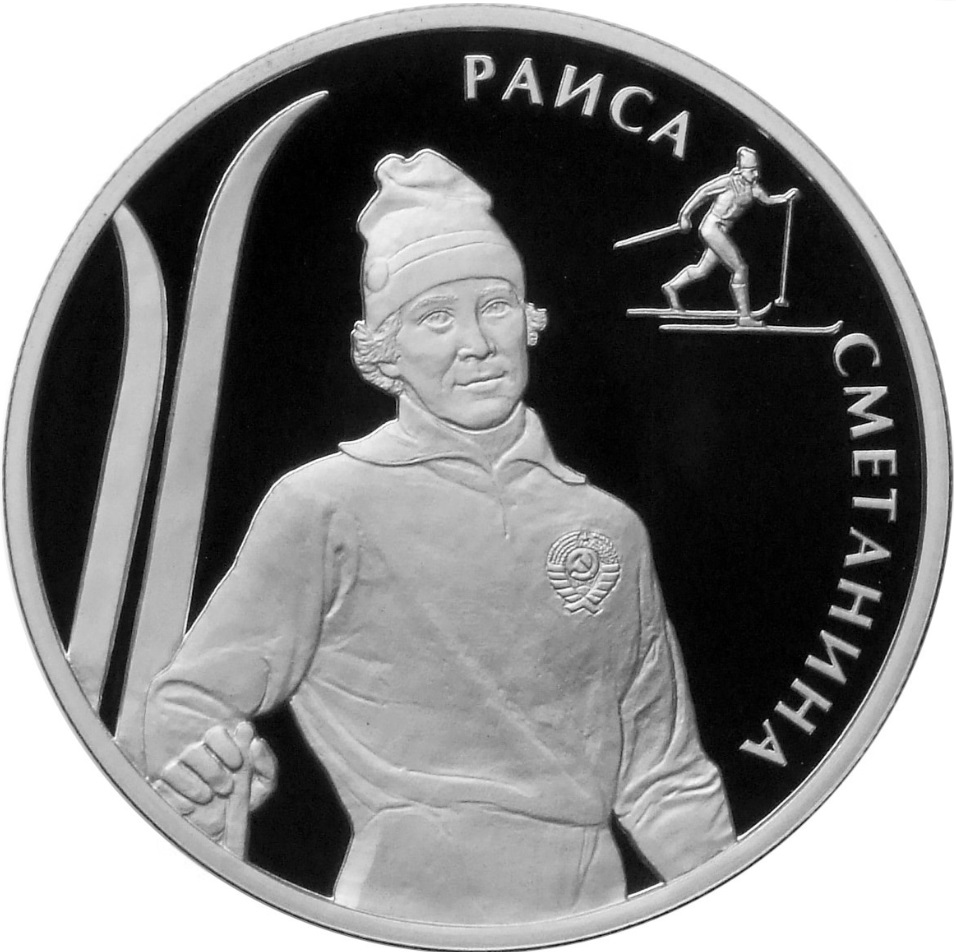
- Smetanina on a 2013 Russian coin

Personal information
- Nationality: Russia
- Born: 29 February 1952 (age 74) Mokhcha, Izhemsky District, Komi ASSR, Russian SFSR, Soviet Union
- Height: 1.61 m (5 ft 3 in)

Sport
- Sport: Skiing
- Club: VSS

World Cup career
- Seasons: 11 – (1982–1992)
- Indiv. starts: 52
- Indiv. podiums: 16
- Indiv. wins: 3
- Team starts: 10
- Team podiums: 9
- Team wins: 3
- Overall titles: 0 – (2nd in 1984)
Medal record
Women's cross-country skiing
Representing Unified Team
Olympic Games
Gold medal – first place	1992 Albertville	4 × 5 km relay
Representing Soviet Union
Olympic Games
Gold medal – first place	1976 Innsbruck	10 km
Gold medal – first place	1976 Innsbruck	4 × 5 km relay
Gold medal – first place	1980 Lake Placid	5 km
Silver medal – second place	1976 Innsbruck	5 km
Silver medal – second place	1980 Lake Placid	4 × 5 km relay
Silver medal – second place	1984 Sarajevo	10 km
Silver medal – second place	1984 Sarajevo	20 km
Silver medal – second place	1988 Calgary	10 km classical
Bronze medal – third place	1988 Calgary	20 km freestyle
World Championships
Gold medal – first place	1974 Falun	4 × 5 km relay
Gold medal – first place	1982 Oslo	20 km
Gold medal – first place	1985 Seefeld	4 × 5 km relay
Gold medal – first place	1991 Val di Fiemme	4 × 5 km relay
Silver medal – second place	1978 Lahti	10 km
Silver medal – second place	1982 Oslo	4 × 5 km relay
Silver medal – second place	1989 Lahti	4 × 5 km relay
Bronze medal – third place	1974 Falun	5 km
Bronze medal – third place	1978 Lahti	5 km
Bronze medal – third place	1978 Lahti	4 × 5 km relay
Bronze medal – third place	1980 Falun	20 km

Raisa Petrovna Smetanina (Russian: Раиса Петровна Сметанина; born 29 February 1952) is a Komi cross-country skiing champion, representing the Soviet Union and later the Unified Team at the Winter Olympic games. She is the first woman in history to win ten Winter Olympic medals.

== Career ==
Smetanina took part in five Olympics, representing the Soviet team four times and the Unified Team once. In particular, Smetanina won two gold and one silver medals at the 1976 Winter Olympics, becoming the most successful athlete there, along with Rosi Mittermaier of West Germany.

In the 1992 Winter Olympics, at the age of 39, Smetanina won a further gold medal competing for the Unified Team in the 4 × 5 km relay, becoming the first woman to win ten Winter Olympic medals and at that time the oldest woman to win a Winter Olympic gold.

Smetanina also had successes at the FIS Nordic World Ski Championships, winning four golds (20 km (1982), and 4 × 5 km relay (1974, 1985, and 1991), three silvers (10 km (1978), and 4 × 5 km relay (1982, 1989)), and four bronzes (4 × 5 km relay (1978), 5 km (1974, 1978), and 20 km (1980)). She also won three times at the Holmenkollen Ski Festival, once in the 10 km (1975) and twice in the 5 km (1975 and 1979).

In 1979 Smetanina received the Holmenkollen Medal (shared with Erik Håker and Ingemar Stenmark). She was also awarded Order of Friendship of Peoples (1984).

== Cross-country skiing results ==
All results are sourced from the International Ski Federation (FIS).

=== Olympic Games ===
- 10 medals – (4 gold, 5 silver, 1 bronze)

Year	Age	5 km	10 km	15 km	Pursuit	20 km	30 km	4 × 5 km relay
1976	23	Silver	Gold	—N/a	—N/a	—N/a	—N/a	Gold
1980	27	Gold	4	—N/a	—N/a	—N/a	—N/a	Silver
1984	31	11	Silver	—N/a	—N/a	Silver	—N/a	4
1988	35	10	Silver	—N/a	—N/a	Bronze	—N/a	—
1992	39	—	—N/a	4	—	—N/a	—	Gold

=== World Championships ===
- 11 medals – (4 gold, 3 silver, 4 bronze)

Year	Age	5 km	10 km classical	10 km freestyle	15 km	20 km	30 km	4 × 5 km relay
1974	21	Bronze	—	—N/a	—N/a	—N/a	—N/a	Gold
1978	25	Bronze	Silver	—N/a	—N/a	5	—N/a	Bronze
1980	27	—N/a	—N/a	—N/a	—N/a	Bronze	—N/a	—N/a
1982	29	15	—	—N/a	—N/a	Gold	—N/a	Silver
1985	32	8	4	—N/a	—N/a	7	—N/a	Gold
1987	34	4	9	—N/a	—N/a	—	—N/a	—
1989	36	—N/a	5	—	4	—N/a	—	Silver
1991	38	11	—N/a	—	—	—N/a	27	Gold

=== World Cup ===
==== Season standings ====
Season	Age	Overall
1982	30	21
1983	31	8
1984	32	2nd place, silver medalist(s)
1985	33	8
1986	34	14
1987	35	10
1988	36	6
1989	37	11
1990	38	13
1991	39	14
1992	40	18

==== Individual podiums ====
- 3 victories
- 16 podiums

No.	Season	Date	Location	Race	Level	Place
1	1981–82	26 February 1982	Oslo, Norway	20 km Individual	World Championships^{[1]}	1st
2	1982–83	5 March 1983	Lahti, Finland	5 km Individual	World Cup	2nd
3	1983–84	9 February 1984	(Socialist Federal Republic of Yugoslavia) Sarajevo, Yugoslavia	10 km Individual	Olympic Games^{[1]}	2nd
4	1983–84	18 February 1984	(Socialist Federal Republic of Yugoslavia) Sarajevo, Yugoslavia	20 km Individual	Olympic Games^{[1]}	2nd
5	1983–84	25 February 1984	Falun, Sweden	10 km Individual	World Cup	1st
6	1983–84	3 March 1984	Lahti, Finland	5 km Individual	World Cup	2nd
7	1983–84	8 March 1984	Oslo, Norway	20 km Individual	World Cup	3rd
8	1983–84	24 March 1984	Murmansk, Soviet Union	10 km Individual	World Cup	2nd
9	1984–85	23 February 1985	Syktyvkar, Soviet Union	20 km Individual	World Cup	1st
10	1985–86	15 February 1986	Oberstdorf, West Germany	20 km Individual C	World Cup	3rd
11	1985–86	22 February 1986	Kavgolovo, Soviet Union	10 km Individual C	World Cup	3rd
12	1986–87	21 March 1987	Oslo, Norway	20 km Individual C	World Cup	2nd
13	1987–88	19 December 1987	Reit im Winkl, West Germany	5 km Individual F	World Cup	2nd
14	1987–88	14 February 1988	Calgary, Canada	10 km Individual C	Olympic Games^{[1]}	2nd
15	1987–88	25 February 1988	Calgary, Canada	20 km Individual F	Olympic Games^{[1]}	3rd
16	1989–90	14 January 1990	Moscow, Soviet Union	7.5 km Individual C	World Cup	2nd

==== Team podiums ====
- 3 victories
- 9 podiums

No.	Season	Date	Location	Race	Level	Place	Teammates
1	1981–82	24 February 1982	Oslo, Norway	4 × 5 km Relay	World Championships^{[1]}	2nd	Lyadova / Zabolotskaya / Kulakova
2	1983–84	26 February 1984	Falun, Sweden	4 × 5 km Relay	World Cup	3rd	Markashanskaya / Zimyatova / Burlakova
3	1984–85	22 January 1985	Seefeld, Austria	4 × 5 km Relay	World Championships^{[1]}	1st	Tikhonova / Vasilchenko / Reztsova
4	1988–89	22 February 1989	Lahti, Finland	4 × 5 km Relay C/F	World Championships^{[1]}	2nd	Shamshurina / Tikhonova / Välbe
5	1988–89	12 March 1989	Falun, Sweden	4 × 5 km Relay C	World Cup	2nd	Lazutina / Tikhonova / Välbe
6	1989–90	4 March 1990	Lahti, Finland	4 × 5 km Relay F	World Cup	2nd	Nageykina / Yegorova / Lazutina
7	1990–91	15 February 1991	Val di Fiemme, Italy	4 × 5 km Relay C/F	World Championships^{[1]}	1st	Yegorova / Tikhonova / Välbe
8	1990–91	15 March 1991	Oslo, Norway	4 × 5 km Relay C/F	World Cup	2nd	Nageykina / Tikhonova / Välbe
9	1991–92	18 February 1992	Albertville, France	4 × 5 km Relay C/F	Olympic Games^{[1]}	1st	Välbe / Lazutina / Yegorova

Note: ^{1} Until the 1999 World Championships and the 1994 Olympics, World Championship and Olympic races were included in the World Cup scoring system.

== See also ==
- List of multiple Winter Olympic medalists
- List of multiple Olympic medalists

Records
Preceded by Herself	Athlete with the most medals at Winter Olympics; 14 February 1998 – 17 February 1998; With: Bjørn Dæhlie	Succeeded by (Norway) Bjørn Dæhlie
Preceded by Herself with (Sweden) Sixten Jernberg	Athlete with the most medals at Winter Olympics; 17 February 1992 – 14 February 1998	Succeeded by Herself with (Norway) Bjørn Dæhlie
Preceded by (Sweden) Sixten Jernberg	Athlete with the most medals at Winter Olympics; 25 February 1988 – 17 February 1992; With: Sixten Jernberg	Succeeded by Herself
