= Silvia Brunner =

Swiss speed skater

Personal information
- Born: January 11, 1958 (age 68) Davos, Graubünden
- Height: 1.68 m (5 ft 6 in)
- Weight: 58 kg (128 lb; 9.1 st)

Sport
- Country: Switzerland
- Sport: Speed skating
Medal record
Women's speed skating
Olympic Games
World Championships

Silvia Brunner (during her marriage Jörg-Brunner) (born 11 January 1958) is a former speed skater who represented her native country Switzerland in two consecutive Winter Olympics, starting in 1980 in Lake Placid, United States.

== History ==
Silvia Brunner first came to the attention of the speedskating world when she won the first of her eight Swiss sprint titles in 1976, just 18 years old. The next years she won the Swiss allround championships six times and participating in the international championships; twice at the World Junior Speed Skating Championships (1977 and 1978, winning a silver distance medal on the 500 meter both times); eight times at the World Sprint Speed Skating Championships (1977–1984); three times at the European Speed Skating Championships (1981–1983) and once at the World Allround Speed Skating Championships (1982) and the two before mentioned Winter Olympics. Over the course of her career Sylvia Brunner skated three speed skating world records for Juniors.

== Records ==
Over the course of her career, Silvia Brunner skated three Junior World Records:

Junior World records, data from
Distance	Result	Date	Location
500 m	43.53	27 Jan 1978	Davos
500 m	43.27	28 Jan 1978	Davos
Sprint combination	176.075	27/28 Jan 1978	Davos

Personal records, data from
Distance	Result	Date	Location
500 m	41.2	5 Feb 1984	Davos
1,000 m	1:23.54	21 Jan 1984	Davos
1,500 m	2:12.27	29 Jan 1984	Davos
3,000 m	4:47.3	29 Dec 1981	Inzell
5,000 m	8:22.77	12 Dec 1982	Inzell
Sprint combination	168.350	12/13 Feb 1983	Davos
Mini combination	177.799	28/29 Dec 1981	Inzell
Small combination	186.667	3/4 Mar 1983	Inzell
