= James Tyler (bobsleigh) =

American bobsledder

Personal information
- Born: August 9, 1960 (age 65) Chicago, Illinois, United States

Sport
- Sport: Bobsleigh

James Tyler (born August 9, 1960) is an American bobsledder. He competed in the two man and the four man events at the 1984 Winter Olympics.
