= Tony McLeod =

British biathlete (born 1959)

Personal information
- Nationality: British
- Born: 29 April 1959 (age 67) Newcastle upon Tyne, England

Sport
- Sport: Biathlon

Anthony McLeod (born 29 April 1959), known as Tony, is a retired British biathlete. McLeod competed in the 20 km individual event at the 1984 Winter Olympics.

His brother is Olympian Mike McLeod.
