= Frederick Burton (alpine skier) =

British alpine skier (born 1959)

Frederick Burton (born 15 March 1959) is a British former alpine skier who competed in the 1984 Winter Olympics.
