= Beat Meier =

Swiss biathlete (1959–2016)

Personal information
- Nationality: Swiss
- Born: 7 March 1959; Chur, Switzerland
- Died: 2016 (aged 56–57)

Sport
- Sport: Biathlon

Beat Meier (7 March 1959 – 2016) was a Swiss biathlete. He competed in the 20 km individual event at the 1984 Winter Olympics.
