= Brent Rushlaw =

American bobsledder

Personal information
- Born: September 16, 1951 (age 74) Saranac Lake, New York, United States

Sport
- Sport: Bobsleigh

Brent Rushlaw (born September 16, 1951) is an American bobsledder. He competed at the 1976, 1980, 1984 and the 1988 Winter Olympics.
