= Peter Brugnani =

British bobsledder

Personal information
- Nationality: British
- Born: 28 October 1958 (age 66); London, England

Sport
- Sport: Bobsleigh

Peter Brugnani (born 28 October 1958) is a British bobsledder. He competed in the two man and the four man events at the 1984 Winter Olympics.
