= Caroline Brittan =

British cross-country skier (born 1959)

Personal information
- Nationality: British
- Born: 9 March 1959 (age 66)

Sport
- Sport: Cross-country skiing

Caroline Brittan (born 9 March 1959) is a British cross-country skier. She competed in the women's 5 kilometres at the 1984 Winter Olympics.
