= Erik Henriksen =

American speed skater

Personal information
- Born: April 8, 1958 (age 68) Champaign, Illinois, United States

Sport
- Sport: Speed skating

Erik Henriksen (born April 8, 1958) is an American speed skater. He competed at the 1984 Winter Olympics and the 1988 Winter Olympics.

Henriksen was born in Champaign, Illinois and raised in Milwaukee, Wisconsin. He was a sprint skater, attending the World Sprint Speed Skating Championships from 1981-1988 and competing predominantly in the 500 m, 1000 m and 1500 m distances.

Henriksen competed in the 1984 Winter Olympics in the 500 m, 1000 m and 1500 m events, and in the 1988 Olympics in the 500 m event.
