= Charles MacIvor (rugby union) =

Irish rugby union player

- Born: Charles Vernon MacIvor; 12 February 1891 British Antilles, West Indies
- Died: 18 October 1913 (aged 22) Dublin, Ireland

Rugby union career
- Position: Wing
International career
Years	Team	Apps	(Points)
1912-1913	Ireland	7	(3)

Charles Vernon MacIvor (12 February 1891 – 18 October 1913) was an Irish rugby union player who played for the Ireland national rugby union team.

== Biography ==
MacIvor was born in the British Antilles on 12 February 1891.

He was an engineering student at Trinity College, Dublin and club captain of Dublin University.

A winger, MacIvor was described as a "plucky" player who had a "good turn of speed".

MacIvor appeared in all four Tests for Ireland in the 1912 Five Nations Championship. In Ireland's final fixture, against Wales in Belfast, MacIvor scored a try to help secure a win, which was enough to leave the Irish as joint Five Nations champions with England. He played three further Tests in the 1913 Five Nations Championship.

=== Death ===
During a practice match at College Park on 17 October 1913, MacIvor received a blow to his head and had to retire hurt ten minutes later. He took a tram back to his home on Upper Pembroke Street where he became ill and was advised by a doctor to go to hospital. An operation was performed the following morning on 18 October to relieve pressure on his brain but he died two hours later. The coroner determined that he died from compression of the brain, as a result of an accidental fall at the football match.
