= Nick Thometz =

American speed skater

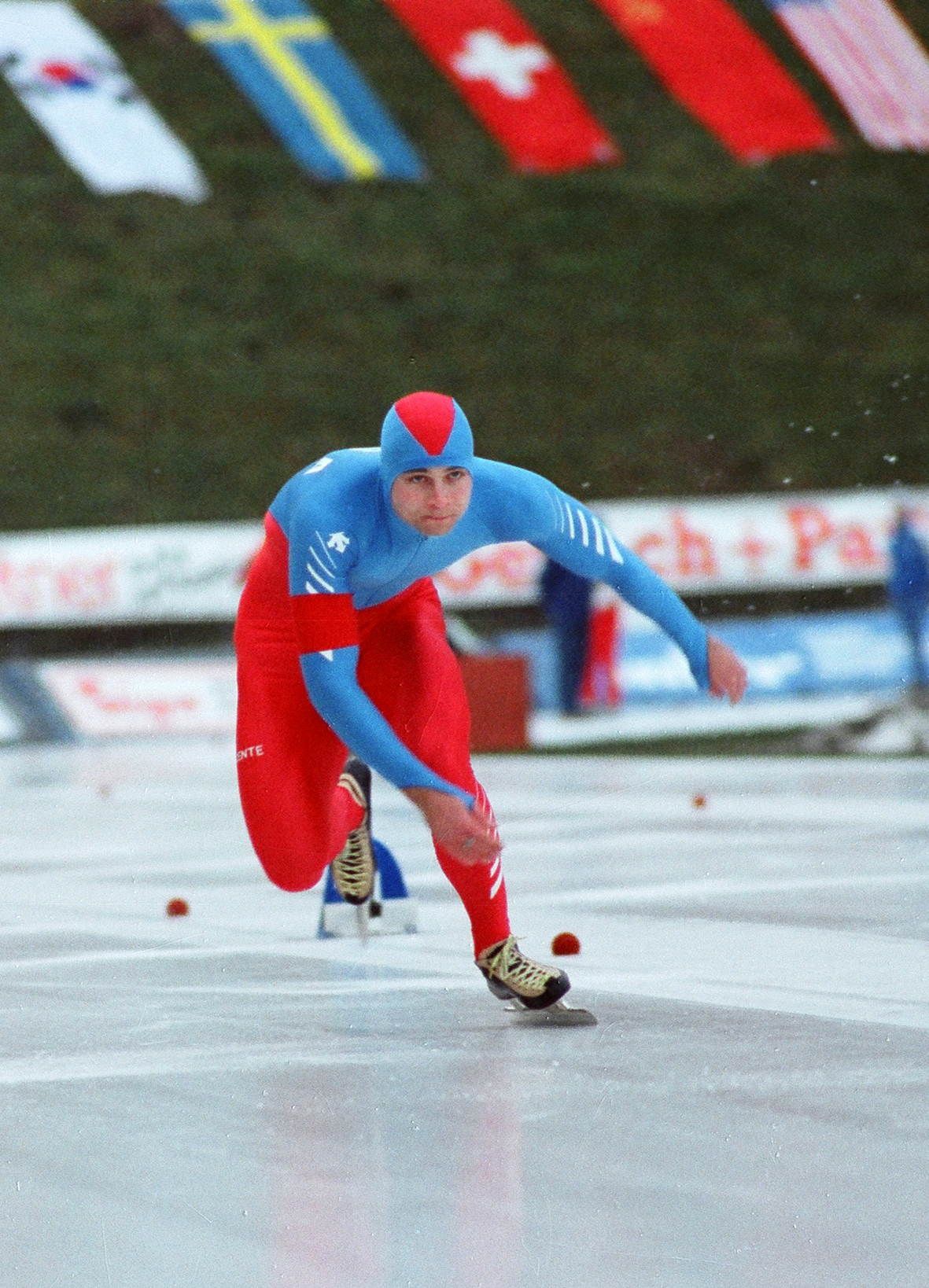

Personal information
- Full name: Keith James Thometz
- Born: September 16, 1963 (age 62) Minneapolis, Minnesota, U.S.

Sport
- Sport: Speed skating
Medal record
Men's speed skating
Representing United States
World Sprint Championships
Silver medal – second place	1987 Sainte Foy	Sprint

Keith James "Nick" Thometz (born September 16, 1963, in Minneapolis, Minnesota) is an American former ice speed-skater. For most of 1987 he held the World record for men's 500 meter speed skating. At the Speed Skating World Cup of 1986-1987 he won the 500 meter and 1000 meter divisions. He also won a silver medal at the 1987 World Sprint Speed Skating Championships for Men. He competed in the Winter Olympic Games three times, but never medaled.

== World records ==
Event	Time	Date	Venue
500 m	0.36,55	March 19, 1987	(Netherlands) Heerenveen

Source: SpeedSkatingStats.com
