= Mark Mitchell (speed skater) =

American speed skater

Personal information
- Nationality: American
- Born: April 6, 1961 (age 64) Minneapolis, Minnesota, United States

Sport
- Sport: Speed skating

Mark Mitchell (born April 6, 1961) is an American speed skater. He competed in three events at the 1984 Winter Olympics.
