= Switzerland at the 1984 Winter Olympics =

- IOC code: SUI
- NOC: Swiss Olympic Association
- Website: www.swissolympic.ch (in German and French)

in Sarajevo
- Competitors: 42 (29 men, 13 women) in 8 sports
- Flag bearer: Erika Hess (alpine skiing)
- Medals Ranked 7th: Gold 2 Silver 2 Bronze 1 Total 5

Winter Olympics appearances (overview)
- 1924; 1928; 1932; 1936; 1948; 1952; 1956; 1960; 1964; 1968; 1972; 1976; 1980; 1984; 1988; 1992; 1994; 1998; 2002; 2006; 2010; 2014; 2018; 2022; 2026; 2030

Switzerland competed at the 1984 Winter Olympics in Sarajevo, Yugoslavia.

== Medalists ==
Medal	Name	Sport	Event	Date
Gold	Max Julen	Alpine skiing	Men's giant slalom	14 February
Gold	Michela Figini	Alpine skiing	Women's downhill	16 February
Silver	Maria Walliser	Alpine skiing	Women's downhill	16 February
Silver	Peter Müller	Alpine skiing	Men's downhill	16 February
Bronze	Silvio Giobellina; Heinz Stettler; Urs Salzmann; Rico Freiermuth	Bobsleigh	Four-man	18 February

== Alpine skiing ==
Men

Athlete	Event	Race 1		Race 2		Total	
Athlete	Event	Time	Rank	Time	Rank	Time	Rank
Conradin Cathomen	Downhill					1:47.63	14
Urs Räber	Downhill					1:46.32	5
Pirmin Zurbriggen	Downhill					1:46.05	4
Peter Müller	Downhill					1:45.86	2nd place, silver medalist(s)
Pirmin Zurbriggen	Giant Slalom	DNF	–	–	–	DNF	–
Joël Gaspoz	Giant Slalom	1:21.98	8	1:21.62	10	2:43.60	10
Thomas Bürgler	Giant Slalom	1:21.75	7	1:22.09	15	2:43.84	11
Max Julen	Giant Slalom	1:20.54	1	1:20.64	2	2:41.18	1st place, gold medalist(s)
Max Julen	Slalom	DNF	–	–	–	DNF	–
Pirmin Zurbriggen	Slalom	DNF	–	–	–	DNF	–
Joël Gaspoz	Slalom	DNF	–	–	–	DNF	–
Thomas Bürgler	Slalom	53.16	11	48.87	9	1:42.03	10

Women

Athlete	Event	Race 1		Race 2		Total	
Athlete	Event	Time	Rank	Time	Rank	Time	Rank
Brigitte Oertli	Downhill					1:14.93	12
Ariane Ehrat	Downhill					1:13.95	4
Maria Walliser	Downhill					1:13.41	2nd place, silver medalist(s)
Michela Figini	Downhill					1:13.36	1st place, gold medalist(s)
Maria Walliser	Giant Slalom	DNF	–	–	–	DNF	–
Monika Hess	Giant Slalom	1:10.90	14	1:13.68	19	2:24.58	15
Michela Figini	Giant Slalom	1:10.58	12	1:12.76	11	2:23.34	12
Erika Hess	Giant Slalom	1:10.54	11	1:11.97	3	2:22.51	7
Brigitte Oertli	Slalom	DNF	–	–	–	DNF	–
Erika Hess	Slalom	49.57	10	48.34	3	1:37.91	5
Monika Hess	Slalom	49.55	9	49.12	10	1:38.67	11

== Biathlon ==
Men

Event	Athlete	Misses ^{1}	Time	Rank
10 km Sprint	Beat Meier	4	34:22.1	32

Event	Athlete	Time	Penalties	Adjusted time ^{2}	Rank
20 km	Beat Meier	1'14:24.4	7	1'21:24.4	31

^{1} A penalty loop of 150 metres had to be skied per missed target.
^{2} One minute added per missed target.

== Bobsleigh ==
Sled	Athletes	Event	Run 1		Run 2		Run 3		Run 4		Total	
Sled	Athletes	Event	Time	Rank	Time	Rank	Time	Rank	Time	Rank	Time	Rank
SUI-1	Hans Hiltebrand; Meinrad Müller	Two-man	51.73	4	52.21	5	51.35	5	51.47	5	3:26.76	5
SUI-2	Ralph Pichler; Rico Freiermuth	Two-man	52.21	6	52.21	5	51.84	7	51.97	6	3:28.23	6

Sled	Athletes	Event	Run 1		Run 2		Run 3		Run 4		Total	
Sled	Athletes	Event	Time	Rank	Time	Rank	Time	Rank	Time	Rank	Time	Rank
SUI-1	Silvio Giobellina; Heinz Stettler; Urs Salzmann; Rico Freiermuth	Four-man	49.92	3	50.48	3	50.49	3	50.50	3	3:21.39	3rd place, bronze medalist(s)
SUI-2	Ekkehard Fasser; Hans Märchy; Kurt Poletti; Rolf Strittmatter	Four-man	50.46	5	50.60	4	50.81	4	51.03	5	3:22.90	4

== Cross-country skiing ==
Men

Event	Athlete	Race	
Event	Athlete	Time	Rank
15 km	Markus Fähndrich	44:08.0	32
15 km	Konrad Hallenbarter	44:00.3	28
15 km	Giachem Guidon	42:45.9	12
15 km	Andi Grünenfelder	42:45.7	11
30 km	Daniel Sandoz	1'39:18.6	46
30 km	Konrad Hallenbarter	1'35:23.2	28
30 km	Giachem Guidon	1'33:28.3	20
30 km	Andi Grünenfelder	1'33:26.4	19
50 km	Markus Fähndrich	2'25:26.4	25
50 km	Giachem Guidon	2'24:25.9	19
50 km	Konrad Hallenbarter	2'21:11.6	9
50 km	Andi Grünenfelder	2'19:46.2	6

Men's 4 × 10 km relay

Athletes	Race	
Athletes	Time	Rank
Giachem Guidon; Konrad Hallenbarter; Joos Ambühl; Andi Grünenfelder	1'58:06.0	5

Women

Event	Athlete	Race	
Event	Athlete	Time	Rank
5 km	Monika Germann	19:42.0	42
5 km	Christina Gilli-Brügger	18:56.2	35
5 km	Karin Thomas	18:30.4	26
5 km	Evi Kratzer	17:47.5	9
10 km	Monika Germann	35:36.0	38
10 km	Karin Thomas	34:31.6	23
10 km	Christina Gilli-Brügger	34:17.8	20
10 km	Evi Kratzer	33:04.8	11
20 km	Monika Germann	1'08:25.5	34
20 km	Karin Thomas	1'06:36.1	22
20 km	Evi Kratzer	1'03:56.4	8

Women's 4 × 5 km relay

Athletes	Race	
Athletes	Time	Rank
Karin Thomas; Monika Germann; Christina Gilli-Brügger; Evi Kratzer	1'09:40.3	6

== Figure skating ==
Women

Athlete	CF	SP	FS	TFP	Rank
Myriam Oberwiler	15	13	14	28.2	14
Sandra Cariboni	4	14	12	20.0	11

== Nordic combined ==
Events:

- normal hill ski jumping (Three jumps, best two counted and shown here.)
- 15 km cross-country skiing

Athlete	Event	Ski Jumping				Cross-country			Total	
Athlete	Event	Distance 1	Distance 2	Points	Rank	Time	Points	Rank	Points	Rank
Walter Hurschler	Individual	66.0	74.0	143.8	28	48:12.4	204.940	4	348.740	26

== Ski jumping ==
Athlete	Event	Jump 1		Jump 2		Total	
Athlete	Event	Distance	Points	Distance	Points	Points	Rank
Fabrice Piazzini	Normal hill	75.0	76.5	73.5	76.1	152.6	53
Christian Hauswirth	Normal hill	73.5	76.6	76.0	82.6	159.2	48
Hansjörg Sumi	Normal hill	80.0	89.5	80.0	89.0	178.5	32
Fabrice Piazzini	Large hill	91.5	74.8	92.5	76.7	151.5	40
Hansjörg Sumi	Large hill	99.0	88.3	98.5	88.1	176.4	22

== Speed skating ==
Women

Event	Athlete	Race	
Event	Athlete	Time	Rank
500 m	Silvia Brunner	42.99	11
1000 m	Silvia Brunner	1:26.61	11
1500 m	Silvia Brunner	2:12.62	16
