= Charles MacIvor (skier) =

British cross-country skier & biathlete (born 1957)

Personal information
- Nationality: British
- Born: 23 January 1957 (age 69) Bettyhill, Scotland

Sport
- Sport: Biathlon, cross-country skiing

Charles MacIvor (born 23 January 1957) is a British cross-country skier and biathlete. He competed at the 1980 Winter Olympics and the 1984 Winter Olympics.

In the 1980 Olympics, MacIvor competed in the 15km cross-country skiing event. In 1984 Olympics, he compete in the biathlon; both in the individual event and the relay event..
