= Lauren Jeffrey =

British cross-country skier (born 1960)

Personal information
- Nationality: British
- Born: 23 June 1960 (age 64); London, England

Sport
- Sport: Cross-country skiing

Lauren Jeffrey (born 23 June 1960) is a British cross-country skier. She competed in two events at the 1984 Winter Olympics.
