= Chen Yufeng (skier) =

Chinese skier (born 1963)

Personal information
- Nationality: Chinese
- Born: 16 April 1963 (age 61); Jilin, China

Sport
- Sport: Cross-country skiing

Chen Yufeng (Chinese: 陈玉凤, born 16 April 1963) is a Chinese cross-country skier. She competed in three events at the 1984 Winter Olympics.
