= Dou Aixia =

Chinese skier (born 1961)

Personal information
- Nationality: Chinese
- Born: 10 August 1961 (age 63); Jilin, China

Sport
- Sport: Cross-country skiing

Dou Aixia (born 10 August 1961) is a Chinese cross-country skier. She competed in three events at the 1984 Winter Olympics.
