= Bryan Carbis =

British ice speed skater (1961–2008)

Bryan Linton Carbis (23 April 1961 in Falkirk, Scotland – 3 December 2008 in Davos, Switzerland) was an ice speed skater from Great Britain, who represented the United Kingdom at the 1984 Winter Olympics in Sarajevo, Yugoslavia. There he finished in 39th (1500 m) and 41st (5000 m) place.

He was active in the speedskating section of the Swiss Skating Union (Schweizer Eislauf Verband), as a member of the International Skating Club in Davos (ISCD) and at the famous Eisstadion Davos icerink.

He died on 3 December 2008.

The name Carbis is of Cornish origin. Bryan was born in Scotland, but resided for the large part of his life in Davos, Switzerland.
