= Livia Reit =

Romanian cross-country skier (born 1960)

Personal information
- Nationality: Romanian
- Born: 8 April 1960 (age 64); Bran, Romania

Sport
- Sport: Cross-country skiing

Livia Reit (born 8 April 1960) is a Romanian cross-country skier. She competed in two events at the 1984 Winter Olympics.
