= Cross-country skiing at the 1984 Winter Olympics – Women's 20 kilometre =

Women's 20 km at the XIV Olympic Winter Games
- Cross-country skiing
- Venue: Igman
- Date: February 18, 1984
- Competitors: 43 from 14 nations
- Winning time: 1:01:45.0

Medalists
1st place, gold medalist(s)		Marja-Liisa Hämäläinen; Finland
2nd place, silver medalist(s)		Raisa Smetanina; Soviet Union
3rd place, bronze medalist(s)		Anne Jahren; Norway

The 20 kilometre cross-country skiing event was part of the cross-country skiing programme for women at the 1984 Winter Olympics, in Sarajevo, Yugoslavia. It was the first time the event took place at the Olympics. The competition was held on Saturday, February 18, 1984 at Veliko Polje, Igman.

Marja-Liisa Hämäläinen of Finland won gold to leave Sarajevo with gold medals in all three individual events.

== Results ==
Rank	Name	Country	Time
1	Marja-Liisa Hämäläinen	Finland	1:01:45.0
2	Raisa Smetanina	Soviet Union	1:02:26.7
3	Anne Jahren	Norway	1:03:13.6
4	Blanka Paulů	Czechoslovakia	1:03:16.9
5	Marie Risby	Sweden	1:03:31.8
6	Britt Pettersen	Norway	1:03:49.0
7	Lyubov Lyadova	Soviet Union	1:03:53.3
8	Evi Kratzer	Switzerland	1:03:56.4
9	Pirkko Määttä	Finland	1:04:37.6
10	Guidina Dal Sasso	Italy	1:04:44.1
11	Inger Helene Nybråten	Norway	1:04:51.2
12	Květa Jeriová	Czechoslovakia	1:04:56.2
13	Tamara Markashanskaya	Soviet Union	1:05:01.7
14	Marit Myrmæl	Norway	1:05:01.9
15	Yuliya Stepanova	Soviet Union	1:05:33.4
16	Anna Pasiarová	Czechoslovakia	1:05:35.7
17	Eija Hyytiäinen	Finland	1:05:38.8
18	Ute Noack	East Germany	1:05:43.5
19	Karin Jäger	West Germany	1:06:20.2
20	Petra Rohrmann	East Germany	1:06:30.0
21	Sharon Firth	Canada	1:06:31.0
22	Karin Thomas	Switzerland	1:06:36.1
23	Ann-Janeth Rosendahl	Sweden	1:06:47.8
24	Viera Klimková	Czechoslovakia	1:06:59.9
25	Shirley Firth	Canada	1:07:02.5
26	Manuela Di Centa	Italy	1:07:10.5
27	Judy Rabinowitz	United States	1:07:11.4
28	Susan Long	United States	1:07:25.9
29	Erja Kuivalainen	Finland	1:07:26.4
30	Carola Anding	East Germany	1:07:27.8
31	Kristina Hugosson	Sweden	1:07:40.5
32	Stina Karlsson	Sweden	1:07:43.4
33	Lynn Spencer-Galanes	United States	1:08:25.0
34	Monika Germann	Switzerland	1:08:25.5
35	Germana Sperotto	Italy	1:10:24.1
36	Ros Coats	Great Britain	1:11:24.1
37	Kelly Milligan	United States	1:11:50.4
38	Metka Munih	Yugoslavia	1:13:35.8
39	Nicola Lavery	Great Britain	1:16:24.0
DNF	Angela Schmidt-Foster	Canada	DNF
DNS	Doris Trueman	Great Britain	DNS
DNS	Livia Reit	Romania	DNS
DNS	Christina Gilli-Brügger	Switzerland	DNS
