= Nicola Lavery =

British cross-country skier (born 1960)

Personal information
- Nationality: British
- Born: 19 November 1960 (age 65) Middlesbrough, England

Sport
- Sport: Cross-country skiing

Nicola Lavery (born 19 November 1960) is a British cross-country skier. She competed in four events at the 1984 Winter Olympics.

She is also a fell runner, having completed a winter Bob Graham Round and won the Wasdale, Ennerdale and Three Shires races.
