= Doris Trueman =

British cross-country skier (born 1953)

Personal information
- Nationality: British
- Born: 23 May 1953 (age 71); Aberdeen, Scotland

Sport
- Sport: Cross-country skiing

Doris Trueman (born 23 May 1953) is a British cross-country skier. She competed in three events at the 1984 Winter Olympics.
