= 1983–84 FIS Cross-Country World Cup =

Cross-country skiing competition

| Discipline | Men | Women |
| Overall | (Sweden) Gunde Svan | (Finland) Marja-Liisa Hämäläinen (2nd title) |
| Nations Cup | Norway | Norway |
- Nations Cup Overall: Norway

Competition
| Locations | 8 venues | 8 venues |
| Individual | 10 events | 10 events |
| Relay/Team | 4 events | 4 events |

The 1983–84 FIS Cross-Country World Cup was the 3rd official World Cup season in cross-country skiing for men and women. The World Cup started in Reit im Winkl, West Germany from 9 December 1983 and finished in Murmansk, Soviet Union 25 March 1984. Gunde Svan of Sweden won the combined men's cup and Marja-Liisa Hämäläinen of Finland won the women's.

== Calendar ==
=== Men ===
| No. | Date | Venue | Event | Winner | Second | Third | Ref. |
|---|---|---|---|---|---|---|---|
| 1 | 10 December 1983 | (West Germany) Reit im Winkl | 15 km | (Soviet Union) Nikolay Zimyatov | (Finland) Harri Kirvesniemi | (West Germany) Jochen Behle | |
| 2 | 16 December 1983 | (Austria) Ramsau | 30 km | (Sweden) Gunde Svan | (Norway) Ove Aunli | (Sweden) Jan Ottosson | |
1984 Winter Olympics
| 3 | 10 February 1984 | (Socialist Federal Republic of Yugoslavia) Sarajevo | 30 km * | (Soviet Union) Nikolay Zimyatov | (Soviet Union) Alexander Zavyalov | (Sweden) Gunde Svan | |
| 4 | 13 February 1984 | (Socialist Federal Republic of Yugoslavia) Sarajevo | 15 km * | (Sweden) Gunde Svan | (Finland) Aki Karvonen | (Finland) Harri Kirvesniemi | |
| 5 | 19 February 1984 | (Socialist Federal Republic of Yugoslavia) Sarajevo | 50 km * | (Sweden) Thomas Wassberg | (Sweden) Gunde Svan | (Finland) Aki Karvonen | |
| 6 | 25 February 1984 | (Sweden) Falun | 30 km | (Sweden) Gunde Svan | (Sweden) Thomas Wassberg | (Norway) Jan Lindvall | |
| 7 | 2 March 1984 | (Finland) Lahti | 15 km | (Norway) Lars Erik Eriksen | (Sweden) Thomas Wassberg | (Sweden) Gunde Svan | |
| 8 | 10 March 1984 | (Norway) Oslo | 50 km | (Norway) Tor Håkon Holte | (Soviet Union) Vladimir Sakhnov | (Sweden) Gunde Svan | |
| 9 | 17 March 1984 | (United States) Fairbanks | 15 km | (Sweden) Gunde Svan | (Switzerland) Andi Grünenfelder | (Norway) Oddvar Brå | |
| 10 | 24 March 1984 | (Soviet Union) Murmansk | 15 km | (Soviet Union) Mikhail Devyatyarov | (Soviet Union) Vladimir Smirnov | (Soviet Union) Andrey Astachkin | |

=== Women ===
| No. | Date | Venue | Event | Winner | Second | Third | Ref. |
|---|---|---|---|---|---|---|---|
| 1 | 9 December 1983 | (West Germany) Reit im Winkl | 5 km | (Czechoslovakia) Květa Jeriová | (Czechoslovakia) Anna Pasiarová | (Soviet Union) Tamara Markaschanskaya | |
| 2 | 17 December 1983 | (France) Autrans | 10 km | (Finland) Marja-Liisa Hämäläinen | (Czechoslovakia) Anna Pasiarová | (Norway) Anne Jahren | |
1984 Winter Olympics
| 3 | 9 February 1984 | (Socialist Federal Republic of Yugoslavia) Sarajevo | 10 km * | (Finland) Marja-Liisa Hämäläinen | (Soviet Union) Raisa Smetanina | (Norway) Brit Pettersen | |
| 4 | 12 February 1984 | (Socialist Federal Republic of Yugoslavia) Sarajevo | 5 km * | (Finland) Marja-Liisa Hämäläinen | (Norway) Berit Aunli | (Czechoslovakia) Květa Jeriová | |
| 5 | 18 February 1984 | (Socialist Federal Republic of Yugoslavia) Sarajevo | 20 km * | (Finland) Marja-Liisa Hämäläinen | (Soviet Union) Raisa Smetanina | (Norway) Anne Jahren | |
| 6 | 25 February 1984 | (Sweden) Falun | 10 km | (Soviet Union) Raisa Smetanina | (Sweden) Marie Risby | (Finland) Marja-Liisa Hämäläinen | |
| 7 | 3 March 1984 | (Finland) Lahti | 5 km | (Norway) Berit Aunli | (Soviet Union) Raisa Smetanina | (Sweden) Marie Risby | |
| 8 | 8 March 1984 | (Norway) Oslo | 20 km | (Norway) Anette Bøe | (Finland) Marja-Liisa Hämäläinen | (Soviet Union) Raisa Smetanina | |
| 9 | 17 March 1984 | (Czechoslovakia) Štrbské Pleso | 5 km | (Czechoslovakia) Květa Jeriová | (Norway) Anette Bøe | (Norway) Inger Helene Nybråten | |
| 10 | 24 March 1984 | (Soviet Union) Murmansk | 10 km | (Norway) Inger Helene Nybråten | (Soviet Union) Raisa Smetanina | (Norway) Anne Jahren | |

=== Men's team events ===
| Date | Venue | Event | Winner | Second | Third | Ref. |
|---|---|---|---|---|---|---|
| 17 December 1983 | (Austria) Ramsau | Relay 4x10 km | Finland Kari Ristanen; Kari Väänänen; Harri Kirvesniemi; Kari Härkönen | Norway II Lars Erik Eriksen; Per Knut Aaland; Leiv-Bjørn Walle; Karl-Kristen Aketun | Sweden Erik Östlund; Benny Kohlberg; Torgny Mogren; Thomas Eriksson | |
| 16 February 1984 | (Socialist Federal Republic of Yugoslavia) Sarajevo | Relay 4x10 km * | Sweden Thomas Wassberg; Benny Kohlberg; Jan Ottosson; Gunde Svan | Soviet Union Oleksandr Batyuk; Alexander Zavyalov; Vladimir Nikitin; Nikolay Zimyatov | Finland Kari Ristanen; Juha Mieto; Harri Kirvesniemi; Aki Karvonen | |
| 26 February 1984 | (Sweden) Falun | Relay 4x10 km | Sweden Erik Östlund; Thomas Wassberg; Jan Ottosson; Gunde Svan | Finland Aki Karvonen; Kari Ristanen; Kari Härkönen; Juha Mieto | Norway I Tor Håkon Holte; Geir Holte; Vegard Ulvang; Hans Erik Tofte | |
| 18 March 1984 | (United States) Fairbanks | Relay 3x10 km | Sweden Thomas Wassberg; Jan Ottosson; Gunde Svan | Norway I Tor Håkon Holte; Geir Holte; Oddvar Brå | Switzerland Konrad Hallenbarter; Giachem Guidon; Andi Grünenfelder | |

=== Women's team events ===
| Date | Venue | Event | Winner | Second | Third | Ref. |
|---|---|---|---|---|---|---|
| 18 December 1983 | (France) Autrans | Relay 3x5 km | Czechoslovakia I Anna Pasiarová; Květoslava Jeriová; Blanka Paulů | Norway Berit Aunli; Anne Jahren; Brit Pettersen | East Germany Petra Sölter; Carola Anding; Ute Noack | |
| 15 February 1984 | (Socialist Federal Republic of Yugoslavia) Sarajevo | Relay 4x5 km * | Norway Inger Helene Nybråten; Anne Jahren; Brit Pettersen; Berit Aunli | Czechoslovakia Dagmar Švubová; Blanka Paulu; Gabriela Svobodová; Květa Jeriová | Finland Pirkko Määttä; Eija Hyytiäinen; Marjo Matikainen; Marja-Liisa Hämäläinen | |
| 26 February 1984 | (Sweden) Falun | Relay 4x5 km | Norway Anette Bøe; Inger Helene Nybråten; Anne Jahren; Brit Pettersen | Finland Pirkko Määttä; Eija Hyytiäinen; Jaana Savolainen; Marja-Liisa Hämäläinen | Soviet Union Tamara Markaschanskaya; Lyubov Zimyatova; Nadesha Burlakova; Raisa Smetanina | |
| 25 March 1984 | (Soviet Union) Murmansk | Relay 3x5 km | Czechoslovakia Anna Pasiarová; Gabriela Svobodová; Květoslava Jeriová | Norway Inger Helene Nybråten; Anne Jahren; Anette Bøe | Soviet Union Lyubov Zimyatova; Raisa Smetanina; Tamara Markaschanskaya | |

- NOTE: Races marked with * counts officially for both as "FIS World Cup" / "Olympic Games" wins statistic

== Overall standings ==
=== Men's standings ===
| Place | Skier | Country | Points |
|---|---|---|---|
| 1. | Gunde Svan | (Sweden) | 145 |
| 2. | Thomas Wassberg | (Sweden) | 96 |
| 3. | Harri Kirvesniemi | (Finland) | 93 |
| 4. | Tor Håkon Holte | (Norway) | 86 |
| 5. | Vladimir Sakhnov | (Soviet Union) | 85 |
| 6. | Nikolay Zimyatov | (Soviet Union) | 84 |
| 7. | Andi Grünenfelder | (Switzerland) | 73 |
| 8. | Lars-Erik Eriksen | (Norway) | 70 |
| 9. | Jan Ottosson | (Sweden) | 65 |
| 10. | Jan Lindvall | (Norway) | 60 |

=== Women's standings ===
| Place | Skier | Country | Points |
|---|---|---|---|
| 1. | Marja-Liisa Hämäläinen | (Finland) | 134 |
| 2. | Raisa Smetanina | (Soviet Union) | 114 |
| 3. | Anne Jahren | (Norway) | 104 |
| 4. | Inger Helene Nybråten | (Norway) | 102 |
| 4. | Květa Jeriová | (Czechoslovakia) | 102 |
| 6. | Marie Risby | (Sweden) | 95 |
| 7. | Berit Aunli | (Norway) | 89 |
| 8. | Brit Pettersen | (Norway) | 87 |
| 9. | Tamara Markaschanskaya | (Soviet Union) | 82 |
| 10. | Anette Bøe | (Norway) | 78 |

== Medal table ==
| Rank | Nation | Gold | Silver | Bronze | Total |
|---|---|---|---|---|---|
| 1 | Sweden (SWE) | 6 | 4 | 5 | 15 |
| 2 | Norway (NOR) | 6 | 3 | 7 | 16 |
| 3 | Finland (FIN) | 4 | 3 | 5 | 12 |
| 4 | Soviet Union (SUN) | 4 | 0 | 0 | 4 |
| 5 | Czechoslovakia (CSK) | 2 | 0 | 0 | 2 |
| 6 | Soviet Union (URS) | 0 | 8 | 3 | 11 |
| 7 | Czechoslovakia (TCH) | 0 | 3 | 1 | 4 |
| 8 | Switzerland (SUI) | 0 | 1 | 0 | 1 |
| 9 | West Germany (FRG) | 0 | 0 | 1 | 1 |
| Totals (9 entries) | | 22 | 22 | 22 | 66 |

== Achievements ==
First World Cup career victory

Men

- (Soviet Union) Nikolay Zimyatov, 28, in his 3rd season - the WC 1 (15 km) in Reit im Winkl; also first podium
- (Norway) Lars Erik Eriksen, 29, in his 3rd season - the WC 7 (15 km) in Lahti; first podium was 1981–82 WC 4 (30 km) in Oslo
- (Norway) Tor Håkon Holte, 25, in his 3rd season - the WC 8 (50 km) in Oslo; first podium was 1981–82 WC 1 (15 km) in Reit im Winkl
- (Soviet Union) Mikhail Devyatyarov, 25, in his 2nd season - the WC 10 (15 km) in Murmansk; first podium was 1982–83 WC 3 (15 km) in Sarajevo

Women

- (Norway) Inger Helene Nybråten, 23, in her 3rd season – the WC 10 (15 km) in Murmansk; first podium was 1981–82 WC 7 (10 km) in Lahti

Victories in this World Cup (all-time number of victories as of 1983/84 season in parentheses)

Men

- Gunde Svan (SWE), 4 (6) first places
- Nikolay Zimyatov (URS), 2 (2) first places
- Thomas Wassberg (SWE), 1 (2) first place
- Tor Håkon Holte (NOR), 1 (1) first place
- Lars Erik Eriksen (NOR), 1 (1) first places
- Mikhail Devyatyarov (URS), 1 (1) first place

Women

- Marja-Liisa Hämäläinen (FIN), 4 (7) first places
- Květa Jeriová (TCH), 2 (8) first places
- Berit Aunli (NOR), 1 (3) first place
- Anette Bøe (NOR), 1 (2) first place
- Raisa Smetanina (URS), 1 (2) first place
- Inger Helene Nybråten (NOR), 1 (1) first place
