= Cross-country skiing at the 1984 Winter Olympics =

Cross-country skiing at the XIV Olympic Winter Games
- Pictogram for cross country skiing
- Venue: Igman
- Dates: February 9—19
- No. of events: 8
- Competitors: 179 (114 men, 65 women) from 32 nations

At the 1984 Winter Olympics eight cross-country skiing events – four each for men and women – were contested. The competitions were held from Thursday, 9 February, to Sunday, 19 February 1984. The women's 20 km debuted at these games.

== Medal summary ==
=== Medal table ===
Rank	Nation	Gold	Silver	Bronze	Total
1	Finland	3	1	4	8
2	Sweden	3	1	1	5
3	Soviet Union	1	4	0	5
4	Norway	1	1	2	4
5	Czechoslovakia	0	1	1	2
Totals (5 entries)		8	8	8	24

=== Participating NOCs ===
Thirty two nations sent cross-country skiers to compete in the events in Sarajevo.

- Argentina
- Australia
- Austria
- Bulgaria
- Canada
- China
- Chinese Taipei
- Costa Rica
- Czechoslovakia
- East Germany
- Finland
- France
- Great Britain
- Greece
- Iceland
- Italy
- Japan
- Liechtenstein
- Mongolia
- Norway
- Poland
- Romania
- San Marino
- South Korea
- Soviet Union
- Spain
- Sweden
- Switzerland
- Turkey
- United States
- West Germany
- Yugoslavia

=== Men's events ===
Event	Gold		Silver		Bronze	
15 km	Gunde Svan; Sweden	41:25.6	Aki Karvonen; Finland	41:34.9	Harri Kirvesniemi; Finland	41:45.6
30 km	Nikolay Zimyatov; Soviet Union	1:28:56.3	Aleksandr Zavyalov; Soviet Union	1:29:23.3	Gunde Svan; Sweden	1:29:35.7
50 km	Thomas Wassberg; Sweden	2:15:55.8	Gunde Svan; Sweden	2:16:00.7	Aki Karvonen; Finland	2:17:04.7
4 × 10 km relay	Sweden; Thomas Wassberg; Benny Kohlberg; Jan Ottosson; Gunde Svan	1:55:06.3	Soviet Union; Aleksandr Batyuk; Aleksandr Zavyalov; Vladimir Nikitin; Nikolay Zimyatov	1:55:16.5	Finland; Kari Ristanen; Juha Mieto; Harri Kirvesniemi; Aki Karvonen	1:56:31.4

=== Women's events ===
Event	Gold		Silver		Bronze	
5 km	Marja-Liisa Hämäläinen; Finland	17:04.0	Berit Aunli; Norway	17:14.1	Květa Jeriová; Czechoslovakia	17:18.3
10 km	Marja-Liisa Hämäläinen; Finland	31:44.2	Raisa Smetanina; Soviet Union	32:02.9	Brit Pettersen; Norway	32:12.7
20 km	Marja-Liisa Hämäläinen; Finland	1:01:45.0	Raisa Smetanina; Soviet Union	1:02:26.7	Anne Jahren; Norway	1:03:13.6
4 × 5 km relay	Norway; Inger Helene Nybråten; Anne Jahren; Brit Pettersen; Berit Aunli	1:06:49.7	Czechoslovakia; Dagmar Švubová; Blanka Paulů; Gabriela Svobodová; Květa Jeriová	1:07:34.7	Finland; Pirkko Määttä; Eija Hyytiäinen; Marjo Matikainen; Marja-Liisa Hämäläinen	1:07:36.7

== See also ==
- Cross-country skiing at the 1984 Winter Paralympics
