= List of FIS Nordic World Ski Championships medalists in women's cross-country skiing =

This is a list of medalists from the FIS Nordic World Ski Championships in women's cross-country skiing. Numbers in brackets denotes number of victories in corresponding disciplines. Boldface denotes record number of victories.

== 10 km ==
Debuted: 1954. Not held: 1993–1999. Resumed: 2001.
Classic style: 1954–1987, 1989, 2001, 2003, 2009, 2011, 2017, 2019, 2025. Free style: 1989, 1991, 2005, 2007, 2013, 2015, 2021, 2023.
Interval start: 1954–1991, 2001–2025.

Championships	Gold	Silver	Bronze
1954 Falun	Lyubov Kozyreva (URS)	Siiri Rantanen (FIN)	Mirja Hietamies (FIN)
1958 Lahti	Alevtina Kolchina (URS)	Lyubov Kozyreva (URS)	Siiri Rantanen (FIN)
1962 Zakopane	Alevtina Kolchina (URS) (2)	Maria Gusakova (URS)	Radya Yeroshina (URS)
1966 Oslo	Klavdiya Boyarskikh (URS)	Alevtina Kolchina (URS)	Toini Gustafsson (SWE)
1970 Vysoké Tatry	Alevtina Olyunina (URS)	Marjatta Kajosmaa (FIN)	Galina Kulakova (URS)
1974 Falun	Galina Kulakova (URS)	Barbara Petzold (GDR)	Helena Takalo (FIN)
1978 Lahti	Zinaida Amosova (URS)	Raisa Smetanina (URS)	Hilkka Riihivuori (FIN)
1982 Oslo	Berit Aunli (NOR)	Hilkka Riihivuori (FIN)	Květa Jeriová (TCH)
1985 Seefeld	Anette Bøe (NOR)	Marja-Liisa Kirvesniemi (FIN)	Grete Ingeborg Nykkelmo (NOR)
1987 Oberstdorf	Anne Jahren (NOR)	Marjo Matikainen (FIN)	Brit Pettersen (NOR)
1989 Lahti (classical)	Marja-Liisa Kirvesniemi (FIN)	Pirkko Määttä (FIN)	Marjo Matikainen (FIN)
1989 Lahti (freestyle)	Yelena Välbe (URS)	Marjo Matikainen (FIN)	Tamara Tikhonova (URS)
1991 Val di Fiemme	Yelena Välbe (URS) (2)	Marie-Helene Westin (SWE)	Tamara Tikhonova (URS)
1993–1999	Not included in the World Championships program		
2001 Lahti	Bente Skari (NOR)	Olga Danilova (RUS)	Larisa Lazutina (RUS)
2003 Val di Fiemme	Bente Skari (NOR) (2)	Kristina Šmigun (EST)	Hilde Gjermundshaug Pedersen (NOR)
2005 Oberstdorf	Kateřina Neumannová (CZE)	Yuliya Chepalova (RUS)	Marit Bjørgen (NOR)
2007 Sapporo	Kateřina Neumannová (CZE) (2)	Olga Zavyalova (RUS)	Arianna Follis (ITA)
2009 Liberec	Aino-Kaisa Saarinen (FIN)	Marianna Longa (ITA)	Justyna Kowalczyk (POL)
2011 Oslo	Marit Bjørgen (NOR)	Justyna Kowalczyk (POL)	Aino-Kaisa Saarinen (FIN)
2013 Val di Fiemme	Therese Johaug (NOR)	Marit Bjørgen (NOR)	Yuliya Chekalyova (RUS)
2015 Falun	Charlotte Kalla (SWE)	Jessie Diggins (USA)	Caitlin Compton Gregg (USA)
2017 Lahti	Marit Bjørgen (NOR) (2)	Charlotte Kalla (SWE)	Astrid Uhrenholdt Jacobsen (NOR)
2019 Seefeld	Therese Johaug (NOR)	Frida Karlsson (SWE)	Ingvild Flugstad Østberg (NOR)
2021 Oberstdorf	Therese Johaug (NOR) **(3)**	Frida Karlsson (SWE)	Ebba Andersson (SWE)
2023 Planica	Jessie Diggins (USA)	Frida Karlsson (SWE)	Ebba Andersson (SWE)
2025 Trondheim	Ebba Andersson (SWE)	Therese Johaug (NOR)	Frida Karlsson (SWE)

Medal table

Rank	Nation	Gold	Silver	Bronze	Total
1	Norway	10	2	6	18
2	Soviet Union	9	4	4	17
3	Finland	2	7	6	15
4	Sweden	2	5	4	11
5	Czech Republic	2	0	0	2
6	United States	1	1	1	3
7	Russia	0	3	2	5
8	Italy	0	1	1	2
8	Poland	0	1	1	2
10	East Germany	0	1	0	1
10	Estonia	0	1	0	1
12	Czechoslovakia	0	0	1	1
Totals (12 entries)		**26**	**26**	**26**	**78**

== 3/4 × 5/7.5 km relay ==
Debuted: 1954.
3×5 km classic style: 1954–1970. 4×5 km classic style: 1974–1985. 4×5 km free style: 1987. 2×5 km classic style + 2×5 km free style: 1989–2023.
2×7.5 km classic style + 2×7.5 km free style: 2025.

Championships	Gold	Silver	Bronze
**3 × 5 km relay**
1954 Falun	Lyubov Kozyreva; Margarita Maslennikova; Valentina Tsaryova; Soviet Union	Sirkka Polkunen; Mirja Hietamies; Siiri Rantanen; Finland	Anna-Lisa Eriksson; Märta Norberg; Sonja Edström; Sweden
1958 Lahti	Radya Yeroshina; Alevtina Kolchina; Lyubov Kozyreva; Soviet Union	Toini Mikkola-Pöysti; Pirkko Korkee; Siiri Rantanen; Finland	Märta Norberg; Irma Johansson; Sonja Edström; Sweden
1962 Zakopane	Lyubov Baranova (3); Maria Gusakova; Alevtina Kolchina; Soviet Union	Barbro Martinsson; Britt Strandberg; Toini Gustafsson; Sweden	Siiri Rantanen; Eeva Ruoppa; Mirja Lehtonen; Finland
1966 Oslo	Klavdiya Boyarskikh; Rita Achkina; Alevtina Kolchina (3); Soviet Union	Ingrid Wigernæs; Inger Aufles; Berit Mørdre; Norway	Barbro Martinsson; Britt Strandberg; Toini Gustafsson; Sweden
1970 Vysoké Tatry	Nina Fyodorova; Galina Kulakova; Alevtina Olyunina; Soviet Union	Gabriele Haupt; Renata Fischer; Anna Unger; East Germany	Senja Pusula; Helena Takalo; Marjatta Kajosmaa; Finland
**4 × 5 km relay**
1974 Falun	Nina Fyodorova (2); Nina Selyunina; Raisa Smetanina; Galina Kulakova (2); Soviet Union	Sigrun Krause; Petra Hinze; Barbara Petzold; Veronika Schmidt; East Germany	Alena Bartošová; Gabriela Sekajová; Miroslava Jaškovská; Blanka Paulů; Czechoslovakia
1978 Lahti	Taina Impiö; Marja-Liisa Hämäläinen; Hilkka Riihivuori; Helena Takalo; Finland	Marlies Rostock; Birgit Schreiber; Barbara Petzold; Christel Meinel; East Germany	Nina Rocheva; Zinaida Amosova; Raisa Smetanina; Galina Kulakova; Soviet Union
1982 Oslo	Anette Bøe; Inger Helene Nybråten; Berit Aunli; Brit Pettersen; Norway	Lyubov Lyadova; Lyubov Zabolotskaya; Raisa Smetanina; Galina Kulakova; Soviet Union	Petra Sölter; Carola Anding; Barbara Petzold; Veronika Hesse; East Germany
1985 Seefeld	Tamara Tikhonova; Raisa Smetanina; Liliya Vasilchenko; Anfisa Romanova; Soviet Union	Anette Bøe; Anne Jahren; Grete Ingeborg Nykkelmo; Berit Aunli; Norway	Manuela Drescher; Gaby Nestler; Antje Misersky; Ute Noack; East Germany
1987 Oberstdorf	Antonina Ordina; Nina Gavrylyuk; Larisa Ptitsyna; Anfisa Reztsova; Soviet Union	Marianne Dahlmo; Nina Skeime; Anne Jahren; Anette Bøe; Norway	Magdalena Wallin; Karin Lamberg-Skog; Annika Dahlman; Marie-Helene Westin; Sweden
1989 Lahti	Pirkko Määttä; Marja-Liisa Kirvesniemi (2); Jaana Savolainen; Marjo Matikainen; Finland	Yuliya Shamshurina; Raisa Smetanina; Tamara Tikhonova; Yelena Välbe; Soviet Union	Inger Helene Nybråten; Anne Jahren; Nina Skeime; Marianne Dahlmo; Norway
1991 Val di Fiemme	Lyubov Yegorova; Raisa Smetanina (3); Tamara Tikhonova (2); Yelena Välbe; Soviet Union	Bice Vanzetta; Manuela Di Centa; Gabriella Paruzzi; Stefania Belmondo; Italy	Solveig Pedersen; Inger Helene Nybråten; Elin Nilsen; Trude Dybendahl; Norway
1993 Falun	Yelena Välbe; Larisa Lazutina; Nina Gavrylyuk; Lyubov Yegorova (2); Russia	Gabriella Paruzzi; Bice Vanzetta; Manuela Di Centa; Stefania Belmondo; Italy	Trude Dybendahl; Inger Helene Nybråten; Anita Moen; Elin Nilsen; Norway
1995 Thunder Bay	Olga Danilova; Yelena Välbe; Larisa Lazutina; Nina Gavrylyuk; Russia	Marit Mikkelsplass; Inger Helene Nybråten; Elin Nilsen; Anita Moen-Guidon; Norway	Anna Frithioff; Marie-Helene Westin; Antonina Ordina; Anette Fanqvist; Sweden
1997 Trondheim	Olga Danilova; Larisa Lazutina; Nina Gavrylyuk; Yelena Välbe (4); Russia	Bente Martinsen; Marit Mikkelsplass; Elin Nilsen; Trude Dybendahl Hartz; Norway	Riikka Sirviö; Tuulikki Pyykkönen; Kati Pulkkinen; Satu Salonen; Finland
1999 Ramsau	Olga Danilova; Larisa Lazutina; Anfisa Reztsova (3); Nina Gavrylyuk; Russia	Sabina Valbusa; Gabriella Paruzzi; Antonella Confortola; Stefania Belmondo; Italy	Viola Bauer; Ramona Roth; Evi Sachenbacher; Sigrid Wille; Germany
2001 Lahti	Olga Danilova (4); Larisa Lazutina **(6)**; Yuliya Chepalova; Nina Gavrylyuk **(6)**; Russia	Anita Moen; Bente Skari; Elin Nilsen; Hilde Gjermundshaug Pedersen; Norway	Gabriella Paruzzi; Sabina Valbusa; Stefania Belmondo; Cristina Paluselli; Italy
2003 Val di Fiemme	Manuela Henkel; Viola Bauer; Claudia Künzel; Evi Sachenbacher; Germany	Anita Moen; Marit Bjørgen; Hilde Gjermundshaug Pedersen; Vibeke Skofterud; Norway	Natalya Korostelyova; Olga Zavyalova; Yelena Burukhina; Nina Gavrylyuk; Russia
2005 Oberstdorf	Vibeke Skofterud; Hilde Gjermundshaug Pedersen; Kristin Størmer Steira; Marit Bjørgen; Norway	Larisa Kurkina; Natalya Baranova-Masalkina; Yevgeniya Medvedeva-Arbuzova; Yuliya Chepalova; Russia	Gabriella Paruzzi; Antonella Confortola; Sabina Valbusa; Arianna Follis; Italy
2007 Sapporo	Virpi Kuitunen; Aino-Kaisa Saarinen; Riitta-Liisa Roponen; Pirjo Manninen; Finland	Stefanie Böhler; Viola Bauer; Claudia Künzel-Nystad; Evi Sachenbacher-Stehle; Germany	Vibeke Skofterud; Marit Bjørgen; Kristin Størmer Steira; Astrid Uhrenholdt Jacobsen; Norway
2009 Liberec	Pirjo Muranen (2); Virpi Kuitunen (2); Riitta-Liisa Roponen (2); Aino-Kaisa Saarinen (2); Finland	Katrin Zeller; Evi Sachenbacher-Stehle; Miriam Gössner; Claudia Künzel-Nystad; Germany	Lina Andersson; Britta Norgren; Anna Haag; Charlotte Kalla; Sweden
2011 Oslo	Vibeke Skofterud (2); Therese Johaug; Kristin Størmer Steira; Marit Bjørgen; Norway	Ida Ingemarsdotter; Anna Haag; Britta Johansson Norgren; Charlotte Kalla; Sweden	Pirjo Muranen; Aino-Kaisa Saarinen; Riitta-Liisa Roponen; Krista Lähteenmäki; Finland
2013 Val di Fiemme	Heidi Weng; Therese Johaug; Kristin Størmer Steira (3); Marit Bjørgen; Norway	Ida Ingemarsdotter; Emma Wikén; Anna Haag; Charlotte Kalla; Sweden	Yuliya Ivanova; Alia Iksanova; Mariya Guschina; Yuliya Chekalyova; Russia
2015 Falun	Heidi Weng; Therese Johaug; Astrid Uhrenholdt Jacobsen; Marit Bjørgen; Norway	Sofia Bleckur; Charlotte Kalla; Maria Rydqvist; Stina Nilsson; Sweden	Aino-Kaisa Saarinen; Kerttu Niskanen; Riitta-Liisa Roponen; Krista Pärmäkoski; Finland
2017 Lahti	Maiken Caspersen Falla; Heidi Weng; Astrid Uhrenholdt Jacobsen (2); Marit Bjørgen (5); Norway	Anna Haag; Charlotte Kalla; Ebba Andersson; Stina Nilsson; Sweden	Aino-Kaisa Saarinen; Kerttu Niskanen; Laura Mononen; Krista Pärmäkoski; Finland
2019 Seefeld	Ebba Andersson; Frida Karlsson; Charlotte Kalla; Stina Nilsson; Sweden	Heidi Weng; Ingvild Flugstad Østberg; Astrid Uhrenholdt Jacobsen; Therese Johaug; Norway	Yuliya Belorukova; Anastasia Sedova; Anna Nechaevskaya; Natalya Nepryayeva; Russia
2021 Oberstdorf	Tiril Udnes Weng; Heidi Weng (4); Therese Johaug (4); Helene Marie Fossesholm; Norway	Yana Kirpichenko; Yuliya Stupak; Tatiana Sorina; Natalya Nepryayeva (Russia) Russian Ski Federation	Jasmi Joensuu; Johanna Matintalo; Riitta-Liisa Roponen; Krista Pärmäkoski; Finland
2023 Planica	Tiril Udnes Weng (2); Astrid Øyre Slind; Ingvild Flugstad Østberg; Anne Kjersti Kalvå; Norway	Laura Gimmler; Katharina Hennig; Pia Fink; Victoria Carl; Germany	Emma Ribom; Ebba Andersson; Frida Karlsson; Maja Dahlqvist; Sweden
**4 × 7.5 km relay**
2025 Trondheim	Emma Ribom; Frida Karlsson (2); Ebba Andersson (2); Jonna Sundling; Sweden	Heidi Weng; Astrid Øyre Slind; Therese Johaug; Kristin Austgulen Fosnæs; Norway	Pia Fink; Katharina Hennig; Helen Hoffmann; Victoria Carl; Germany

Medal table

Rank	Nation	Gold	Silver	Bronze	Total
1	Soviet Union	9	2	1	12
2	Norway	8	9	4	21
3	Russia	5	1	3	9
4	Finland	4	2	7	13
5	Sweden	2	5	7	14
6	Germany	1	3	2	6
7	East Germany	0	3	2	5
7	Italy	0	3	2	5
9	(Russia) Russian Ski Federation	0	1	0	1
10	Czechoslovakia	0	0	1	1
Totals (10 entries)		**29**	**29**	**29**	**87**

== 5 km (discontinued) ==
Debuted: 1962. Not held: 1989. Resumed: 1991. Discontinued: 1999.
Classic style: 1962–1987, 1991–1999.
Interval start: 1962–1987, 1991–1999.

Championships	Gold	Silver	Bronze
1962 Zakopane	Alevtina Kolchina (URS)	Lyubov Baranova (URS)	Maria Gusakova (URS)
1966 Oslo	Alevtina Kolchina (URS) **(2)**	Klavdiya Boyarskikh (URS)	Rita Achkina (URS)
1970 Vysoké Tatry	Galina Kulakova (URS)	Galina Pilyushenko (URS)	Nina Fyodorova (URS)
1974 Falun	Galina Kulakova (URS) **(2)**	Blanka Paulů (TCH)	Raisa Smetanina (URS)
1978 Lahti	Helena Takalo (FIN)	Hilkka Riihivuori (FIN)	Raisa Smetanina (URS)
1982 Oslo	Berit Aunli (NOR)	Hilkka Riihivuori (FIN)	Brit Pettersen (NOR)
1985 Seefeld	Anette Bøe (NOR)	Marja-Liisa Kirvesniemi (FIN)	Grete Ingeborg Nykkelmo (NOR)
1987 Oberstdorf	Marjo Matikainen (FIN)	Anfisa Reztsova (URS)	Evi Kratzer (SUI)
1989	Not included in the World Championships program		
1991 Val di Fiemme	Trude Dybendahl (NOR)	Marja-Liisa Kirvesniemi (FIN)	Manuela Di Centa (ITA)
1993 Falun	Larisa Lazutina (RUS)	Lyubov Yegorova (RUS)	Trude Dybendahl (NOR)
1995 Thunder Bay	Larisa Lazutina (RUS) **(2)**	Nina Gavrylyuk (RUS)	Manuela Di Centa (ITA)
1997 Trondheim	Yelena Välbe (RUS)	Stefania Belmondo (ITA)	Olga Danilova (RUS)
1999 Ramsau	Bente Martinsen (NOR)	Olga Danilova (RUS)	Kateřina Neumannová (CZE)

Medal table

Rank	Nation	Gold	Silver	Bronze	Total
1	Soviet Union	4	4	5	13
2	Norway	4	0	3	7
3	Russia	3	3	1	7
4	Finland	2	4	0	6
5	Italy	0	1	2	3
6	Czechoslovakia	0	1	0	1
7	Czech Republic	0	0	1	1
7	Switzerland	0	0	1	1
Totals (8 entries)		**13**	**13**	**13**	**39**

== 20 km, 30 km and 50 km ==
Debuted: 1978. Cancelled due to weather conditions: 2001.
Classic style: 1978–1985, 1997, 1999, 2005, 2007, 2013, 2015, 2021, 2023. Free style: 1987–1995, 2003, 2009, 2011, 2017, 2019, 2025.
Interval start: 1978–1999, 2003. Mass start: 2005–2025.

Championships	Gold	Silver	Bronze
**20 km**
1978 Lahti	Zinaida Amosova (URS)	Galina Kulakova (URS)	Helena Takalo (FIN)
1980 Falun	Veronika Hesse (GDR)	Galina Kulakova (URS)	Raisa Smetanina (URS)
1982 Oslo	Raisa Smetanina (URS)	Berit Aunli (NOR)	Hilkka Riihivuori (FIN)
1985 Seefeld	Grete Ingeborg Nykkelmo (NOR)	Brit Pettersen (NOR)	Anette Bøe (NOR)
1987 Oberstdorf	Marie-Helene Westin (SWE)	Anfisa Reztsova (URS)	Larisa Ptitsyna (URS)
**30 km**
1989 Lahti	Yelena Välbe (URS)	Larisa Lazutina (URS)	Marjo Matikainen (FIN)
1991 Val di Fiemme	Lyubov Yegorova (URS)	Yelena Välbe (URS)	Manuela Di Centa (ITA)
1993 Falun	Stefania Belmondo (ITA)	Manuela Di Centa (ITA)	Lyubov Yegorova (RUS)
1995 Thunder Bay	Yelena Välbe (RUS)	Manuela Di Centa (ITA)	Antonina Ordina (SWE)
1997 Trondheim	Yelena Välbe (RUS) (3)	Stefania Belmondo (ITA)	Marit Mikkelsplass (NOR)
1999 Ramsau	Larisa Lazutina (RUS)	Olga Danilova (RUS)	Kristina Šmigun (EST)
2001 Lahti	Cancelled due to extremely cold weather		
2003 Val di Fiemme	Olga Zavyalova (RUS)	Yelena Burukhina (RUS)	Kristina Šmigun (EST)
2005 Oberstdorf	Marit Bjørgen (NOR)	Virpi Kuitunen (FIN)	Natalya Baranova-Masalkina (RUS)
2007 Sapporo	Virpi Kuitunen (FIN)	Kristin Størmer Steira (NOR)	Therese Johaug (NOR)
2009 Liberec	Justyna Kowalczyk (POL)	Yevgeniya Medvedeva-Arbuzova (RUS)	Valentyna Shevchenko (UKR)
2011 Oslo	Therese Johaug (NOR)	Marit Bjørgen (NOR)	Justyna Kowalczyk (POL)
2013 Val di Fiemme	Marit Bjørgen (NOR)	Justyna Kowalczyk (POL)	Therese Johaug (NOR)
2015 Falun	Therese Johaug (NOR)	Marit Bjørgen (NOR)	Charlotte Kalla (SWE)
2017 Lahti	Marit Bjørgen (NOR) (3)	Heidi Weng (NOR)	Astrid Uhrenholdt Jacobsen (NOR)
2019 Seefeld	Therese Johaug (NOR)	Ingvild Flugstad Østberg (NOR)	Frida Karlsson (SWE)
2021 Oberstdorf	Therese Johaug (NOR) **(4)**	Heidi Weng (NOR)	Frida Karlsson (SWE)
2023 Planica	Ebba Andersson (SWE)	Anne Kjersti Kalvå (NOR)	Frida Karlsson (SWE)
**50 km**
2025 Trondheim	Frida Karlsson (SWE)	Heidi Weng (NOR)	Therese Johaug (NOR)

Medal table

Rank	Nation	Gold	Silver	Bronze	Total
1	Norway	8	10	6	24
2	Soviet Union	4	5	2	11
3	Russia	4	3	2	9
4	Sweden	3	0	5	8
5	Italy	1	3	1	5
6	Finland	1	1	3	5
7	Poland	1	1	1	3
8	East Germany	1	0	0	1
9	Estonia	0	0	2	2
10	Ukraine	0	0	1	1
Totals (10 entries)		**23**	**23**	**23**	**69**

== 15 km (discontinued) ==
Debuted: 1989. Discontinued: 2003.
Classic style: 1989–1995, 2001, 2003. Free style: 1997, 1999.
Interval start: 1989–2001. Mass start: 2003.

Championships	Gold	Silver	Bronze
1989 Lahti	Marjo Matikainen (FIN)	Marja-Liisa Kirvesniemi (FIN)	Pirkko Määttä (FIN)
1991 Val di Fiemme	Yelena Välbe (URS)	Trude Dybendahl (NOR)	Stefania Belmondo (ITA)
1993 Falun	Yelena Välbe (RUS)	Marja-Liisa Kirvesniemi (FIN)	Marjut Rolig (FIN)
1995 Thunder Bay	Larisa Lazutina (RUS)	Yelena Välbe (RUS)	Inger Helene Nybråten (NOR)
1997 Trondheim	Yelena Välbe (RUS) **(3)**	Stefania Belmondo (ITA)	Kateřina Neumannová (CZE)
1999 Ramsau	Stefania Belmondo (ITA)	Kristina Šmigun (EST)	Maria Theurl (AUT)
2001 Lahti	Bente Skari (NOR)	Olga Danilova (RUS)	Kaisa Varis (FIN)
2003 Val di Fiemme	Bente Skari (NOR) (2)	Kristina Šmigun (EST)	Olga Zavyalova (RUS)

Medal table

Rank	Nation	Gold	Silver	Bronze	Total
1	Russia	3	2	1	6
2	Norway	2	1	1	4
3	Finland	1	2	3	6
4	Italy	1	1	1	3
5	Soviet Union	1	0	0	1
6	Estonia	0	2	0	2
7	Austria	0	0	1	1
7	Czech Republic	0	0	1	1
Totals (8 entries)		**8**	**8**	**8**	**24**

== Combined/double pursuit/Skiathlon ==
Debuted: 1993.

Championships	Gold	Silver	Bronze
**5 km classical interval start + 10 km freestyle pursuit. Separate days.**
1993 Falun	Stefania Belmondo (ITA)	Larisa Lazutina (RUS)	Lyubov Yegorova (RUS)
1995 Thunder Bay	Larisa Lazutina (RUS)	Nina Gavrylyuk (RUS)	Olga Danilova (RUS)
1997 Trondheim	Yelena Välbe (RUS)	Stefania Belmondo (ITA)	Nina Gavrylyuk (RUS)
1999 Ramsau	Stefania Belmondo (ITA) (2)	Nina Gavrylyuk (RUS)	Iryna Taranenko-Terelya (UKR)
**5 km classical interval start + 5 km freestyle pursuit. Same day**
2001 Lahti	Virpi Kuitunen (FIN)	Larisa Lazutina (RUS)	Olga Danilova (RUS)
**5 km classical mass start; then 5 km freestyle pursuit**
2003 Val di Fiemme	Kristina Šmigun (EST)	Evi Sachenbacher (GER)	Olga Zavyalova (RUS)
**7.5 km classical mass start; then 7.5 km freestyle pursuit**
2005 Oberstdorf	Yuliya Chepalova (RUS)	Marit Bjørgen (NOR)	Kristin Størmer Steira (NOR)
2007 Sapporo	Olga Zavyalova (RUS)	Kateřina Neumannová (CZE)	Kristin Størmer Steira (NOR)
2009 Liberec	Justyna Kowalczyk (POL)	Kristin Størmer Steira (NOR)	Aino-Kaisa Saarinen (FIN)
2011 Oslo	Marit Bjørgen (NOR)	Justyna Kowalczyk (POL)	Therese Johaug (NOR)
2013 Val di Flemme	Marit Bjørgen (NOR)	Therese Johaug (NOR)	Heidi Weng (NOR)
2015 Falun	Therese Johaug (NOR)	Astrid Uhrenholdt Jacobsen (NOR)	Charlotte Kalla (SWE)
2017 Lahti	Marit Bjørgen (NOR) **(3)**	Krista Pärmäkoski (FIN)	Charlotte Kalla (SWE)
2019 Seefeld	Therese Johaug (NOR)	Ingvild Flugstad Østberg (NOR)	Natalya Nepryayeva (RUS)
2021 Oberstdorf	Therese Johaug (NOR) **(3)**	Frida Karlsson (SWE)	Ebba Andersson (SWE)
2023 Planica	Ebba Andersson (SWE)	Frida Karlsson (SWE)	Astrid Øyre Slind (NOR)
**10 km classic mass start; then 10 km freestyle pursuit**
2025 Trondheim	Ebba Andersson (SWE) (2)	Therese Johaug (NOR)	Jonna Sundling (SWE)

Medal table

Rank	Nation	Gold	Silver	Bronze	Total
1	Norway	6	6	5	17
2	Russia	4	4	6	14
3	Sweden	2	2	4	8
4	Italy	2	1	0	3
5	Finland	1	1	1	3
6	Poland	1	1	0	2
7	Estonia	1	0	0	1
8	Czech Republic	0	1	0	1
8	Germany	0	1	0	1
10	Ukraine	0	0	1	1
Totals (10 entries)		**17**	**17**	**17**	**51**

== Individual sprint ==
Debuted: 2001.
Classic style: 2005, 2007, 2013, 2015, 2021, 2023. Free style: 2001, 2003, 2009, 2011, 2017, 2019, 2025.

Championships	Gold	Silver	Bronze
2001 Lahti	Pirjo Manninen (FIN)	Kati Sundqvist (FIN)	Yuliya Chepalova (RUS)
2003 Val di Fiemme	Marit Bjørgen (NOR)	Claudia Künzel (GER)	Hilde Gjermundshaug Pedersen (NOR)
2005 Oberstdorf	Emelie Öhrstig (SWE)	Lina Andersson (SWE)	Sara Renner (CAN)
2007 Sapporo	Astrid Uhrenholdt Jacobsen (NOR)	Petra Majdič (SLO)	Virpi Kuitunen (FIN)
2009 Liberec	Arianna Follis (ITA)	Kikkan Randall (USA)	Pirjo Muranen (FIN)
2011 Oslo	Marit Bjørgen (NOR)	Arianna Follis (ITA)	Petra Majdič (SLO)
2013 Val di Fiemme	Marit Bjørgen (NOR)	Ida Ingemarsdotter (SWE)	Maiken Caspersen Falla (NOR)
2015 Falun	Marit Bjørgen (NOR) **(4)**	Stina Nilsson (SWE)	Maiken Caspersen Falla (NOR)
2017 Lahti	Maiken Caspersen Falla (NOR)	Jessie Diggins (USA)	Kikkan Randall (USA)
2019 Seefeld	Maiken Caspersen Falla (NOR) (2)	Stina Nilsson (SWE)	Mari Eide (NOR)
2021 Oberstdorf	Jonna Sundling (SWE)	Maiken Caspersen Falla (NOR)	Anamarija Lampič (SLO)
2023 Planica	Jonna Sundling (SWE)	Emma Ribom (SWE)	Maja Dahlqvist (SWE)
2025 Trondheim	Jonna Sundling (SWE) (3)	Kristine Stavås Skistad (NOR)	Nadine Fähndrich (SUI)

Medal table

Rank	Nation	Gold	Silver	Bronze	Total
1	Norway	7	2	4	13
2	Sweden	4	5	1	10
3	Finland	1	1	2	4
4	Italy	1	1	0	2
5	United States	0	2	1	3
6	Slovenia	0	1	2	3
7	Germany	0	1	0	1
8	Canada	0	0	1	1
8	Russia	0	0	1	1
8	Switzerland	0	0	1	1
Totals (10 entries)		**13**	**13**	**13**	**39**

== Team sprint ==
Debuted: 2005.
Classic style: 2009, 2011, 2017, 2019, 2025. Free style: 2005, 2007, 2013, 2015, 2021, 2023.

Championships	Gold	Silver	Bronze
2005 Oberstdorf	Hilde Gjermundshaug Pedersen; Marit Bjørgen; Norway	Riitta-Liisa Lassila; Pirjo Manninen; Finland	Yuliya Chepalova; Alyona Sidko; Russia
2007 Sapporo	Riitta-Liisa Roponen; Virpi Kuitunen; Finland	Evi Sachenbacher-Stehle; Claudia Künzel-Nystad; Germany	Astrid Uhrenholdt Jacobsen; Marit Bjørgen; Norway
2009 Liberec	Aino-Kaisa Saarinen; Virpi Kuitunen (2); Finland	Anna Olsson; Lina Andersson; Sweden	Marianna Longa; Arianna Follis; Italy
2011 Oslo	Ida Ingemarsdotter; Charlotte Kalla; Sweden	Aino-Kaisa Saarinen; Krista Lähteenmäki; Finland	Maiken Caspersen Falla; Astrid Uhrenholdt Jacobsen; Norway
2013 Val di Flemme	Jessie Diggins; Kikkan Randall; United States	Charlotte Kalla; Ida Ingemarsdotter; Sweden	Riikka Sarasoja-Lilja; Krista Lähteenmäki; Finland
2015 Falun	Ingvild Flugstad Østberg; Maiken Caspersen Falla; Norway	Ida Ingemarsdotter; Stina Nilsson; Sweden	Justyna Kowalczyk; Sylwia Jaśkowiec; Poland
2017 Lahti	Heidi Weng; Maiken Caspersen Falla (2); Norway	Yuliya Belorukova; Natalya Matveyeva; Russia	Sadie Bjornsen; Jessie Diggins; United States
2019 Seefeld	Stina Nilsson; Maja Dahlqvist; Sweden	Katja Višnar; Anamarija Lampič; Slovenia	Ingvild Flugstad Østberg; Maiken Caspersen Falla; Norway
2021 Oberstdorf	Maja Dahlqvist; Jonna Sundling; Sweden	Laurien van der Graaff; Nadine Fähndrich; Switzerland	Eva Urevc; Anamarija Lampič; Slovenia
2023 Planica	Emma Ribom; Jonna Sundling; Sweden	Anne Kjersti Kalvå; Tiril Udnes Weng; Norway	Jessie Diggins; Julia Kern; United States
2025 Trondheim	Maja Dahlqvist **(3)**; Jonna Sundling **(3)**; Sweden	Jessie Diggins; Julia Kern; United States	Anja Weber; Nadine Fähndrich; Switzerland

Medal table

Rank	Nation	Gold	Silver	Bronze	Total
1	Sweden	5	3	0	8
2	Norway	3	1	3	7
3	Finland	2	2	1	5
4	United States	1	1	2	4
5	Russia	0	1	1	2
5	Slovenia	0	1	1	2
5	Switzerland	0	1	1	2
8	Germany	0	1	0	1
9	Italy	0	0	1	1
9	Poland	0	0	1	1
Totals (10 entries)		**11**	**11**	**11**	**33**

== Medal table ==
Table updated after the 2025 Championships.

Rank	Nation	Gold	Silver	Bronze	Total
1	Norway	48	31	32	111
2	Soviet Union	27	15	12	54
3	Russia	19	17	17	53
4	Sweden	18	20	21	59
5	Finland	14	20	23	57
6	Italy	5	11	8	24
7	United States	2	4	4	10
8	Poland	2	3	3	8
9	Czech Republic	2	1	2	5
10	Germany	1	6	2	9
11	East Germany	1	4	2	7
12	Estonia	1	3	2	6
13	Slovenia	0	2	3	5
14	Switzerland	0	1	3	4
15	Czechoslovakia	0	1	2	3
16	(Russia) Russian Ski Federation	0	1	0	1
17	Ukraine	0	0	2	2
18	Austria	0	0	1	1
18	Canada	0	0	1	1
Totals (19 entries)		**140**	**140**	**140**	**420**

== Multiple medalists ==
Boldface denotes active cross-country skiers and highest medal count among all cross-country skiers (including these who not included in these tables) per type.

=== All events ===
Rank	Cross-country skier	Country	From	To	Gold	Silver	Bronze	Total
1	Marit Bjørgen	Norway	2003	2017	**18**	5	3	**26**
2	Therese Johaug	Norway	2007	2025	14	5	4	23
3	Yelena Välbe	Soviet Union; Russia	1989	1997	14	3	–	17
4	Larisa Lazutina (Ptitsyna)	Soviet Union; Russia	1987	2001	11	3	2	16
5	Alevtina Kolchina	Soviet Union	1958	1966	7	1	–	8
6	**Jonna Sundling**	Sweden	2021	2025	7	–	1	8
7	Nina Gavrylyuk	Soviet Union; Russia	1987	2003	6	3	2	11
8	**Ebba Andersson**	Sweden	2017	2025	6	1	4	11
9	Virpi Kuitunen	Finland	2001	2009	6	1	1	8
10	**Heidi Weng**	Norway	2013	2025	5	5	1	11

=== Individual events ===
Rank	Cross-country skier	Country	From	To	Gold	Silver	Bronze	Total
1	Marit Bjørgen	Norway	2003	2017	**12**	4	1	**17**
2	Therese Johaug	Norway	2007	2025	10	3	4	**17**
3	Yelena Välbe	Soviet Union; Russia	1989	1997	10	2	–	12
4	Larisa Lazutina (Ptitsyna)	Soviet Union; Russia	1987	2001	5	3	2	10
5	Bente Skari (Martinsen)	Norway	1999	2003	5	–	–	5
6	Stefania Belmondo	Italy	1991	1999	4	4	1	9
7	Alevtina Kolchina	Soviet Union	1958	1966	4	1	–	5
8	**Ebba Andersson**	Sweden	2021	2025	4	–	3	7
9	Galina Kulakova	Soviet Union	1970	1980	3	1	1	5
10	**Jonna Sundling**	Sweden	2021	2025	3	–	1	4

== Best performers by country ==
Here are listed most successful cross-country skiers in the history of each medal-winning national team – according to the gold-first ranking system and by total number of World Championships medals (one skier if he holds national records in both categories or few skiers if these national records belongs to different persons). If the total number of medals is identical, the gold, silver and bronze medals are used as tie-breakers (in that order). If all numbers are the same, the skiers get the same placement and are sorted by the alphabetic order.

Country	Cross-country skier	From	To	Gold	Silver	Bronze	Total
Norway	Marit Bjørgen	2003	2017	**18**	5	3	**26**
Soviet Union; Russia	Yelena Välbe	1989	1997	14	3	–	17
Russia (as such only)	Larisa Lazutina	1993	2001	10	2	1	13
Soviet Union (as such only)	Alevtina Kolchina (by the gold first ranking system)	1958	1966	7	1	–	8
Soviet Union (as such only)	Raisa Smetanina (by total number of medals)	1974	1991	4	4	4	12
Sweden	**Jonna Sundling** (by the gold first ranking system)	2021	2025	7	–	1	8
Sweden	Charlotte Kalla (by total number of medals)	2009	2019	3	6	4	13
Finland	Virpi Kuitunen (by the gold first ranking system)	2001	2009	6	1	1	8
Finland	Aino-Kaisa Saarinen (by total number of medals)	2007	2017	4	1	**5**	10
Italy	Stefania Belmondo	1991	2001	4	**7**	2	13
Poland	Justyna Kowalczyk	2009	2015	2	3	3	8
United States	Jessie Diggins	2013	2025	2	3	2	7
Czech Republic	Kateřina Neumannová*	1997	2007	2	1	2	5
Germany	Evi Sachenbacher-Stehle	1999	2009	1	4	1	6
Estonia	Kristina Šmigun*	1999	2003	1	3	2	6
East Germany	Veronika Hesse (Schmidt) (by the gold first ranking system)	1974	1982	1	1	1	3
East Germany	Barbara Petzold (by total number of medals)	1974	1982	–	3	1	4
Slovenia	Anamarija Lampič	2019	2021	–	1	2	3
Switzerland	Nadine Fähndrich	2021	2025	–	1	2	3
Czechoslovakia	Blanka Paulů	1974	1974	–	1	1	2
(Russia) Russian Ski Federation (as such only)	Yana Kirpichenko	2021	2021	–	1	–	1
(Russia) Russian Ski Federation (as such only)	**Natalya Nepryayeva**	2021	2021	–	1	–	1
(Russia) Russian Ski Federation (as such only)	**Tatiana Sorina**	2021	2021	–	1	–	1
(Russia) Russian Ski Federation (as such only)	**Yuliya Stupak**	2021	2021	–	1	–	1
Austria	Maria Theurl*	1999	1999	–	–	1	1
Canada	Sara Renner*	2005	2005	–	–	1	1
Ukraine	Valentyna Shevchenko	2009	2009	–	–	1	1
Ukraine	Iryna Taranenko-Terelya	1999	1999	–	–	1	1

An asterisk (*) marks athletes who are the only representatives of their respective countries to win a medal.

== Multiple medals at one championship ==
- 5 medals:
  - out of 5 possible:
    - 1997 Yelena Välbe (Russia)
    - 1989 Marjo Matikainen (Finland)
  - out of 6 possible:
    - 2011 Marit Bjørgen (Norway)
    - 2013 Marit Bjørgen (Norway)
    - 2005 Marit Bjørgen (Norway)
    - 2019 Ingvild Flugstad Østberg (Norway)
- 4 medals:
  - out of 4 possible:
    - 1982 Berit Aunli (Norway)
    - 1985 Anette Bøe (Norway)
    - 1985 Grete Ingeborg Nykkelmo (Norway)
    - 1978 Raisa Smetanina (Soviet Union)
  - out of 5 possible:
    - 1995 Larisa Lazutina (Russia)
    - 1991 Yelena Välbe (Soviet Union)
    - 2001 Olga Danilova (Russia)
    - 1993 Lyubov Yegorova (Russia)
    - 1997 Stefania Belmondo (Italy)
  - out of 6 possible:
    - 2017 Marit Bjørgen (Norway)
    - 2021 Therese Johaug (Norway)
    - 2019 Therese Johaug (Norway)
    - 2007 Virpi Kuitunen (Finland)
    - 2009 Aino-Kaisa Saarinen (Finland)
    - 2025 Jonna Sundling (Sweden)
    - 2013 Therese Johaug (Norway)
    - 2023 Ebba Andersson (Sweden)
    - 2003 Kristina Šmigun (Estonia) (all four individual)
    - 2005 Yuliya Chepalova (Russia)
    - 2015 Charlotte Kalla (Sweden)
    - 2003 Olga Zavyalova (Russia)
    - 2025 Therese Johaug (Norway)
    - 2023 Frida Karlsson (Sweden)
- 3 medals:
  - out of 3 possible:
    - 1962 Alevtina Kolchina (Soviet Union)
    - 1974 Galina Kulakova (Soviet Union)
    - 1966 Klavdiya Boyarskikh (Soviet Union)
    - 1966 Alevtina Kolchina (Soviet Union)
    - 1970 Galina Kulakova (Soviet Union)
    - 1962 Maria Gusakova (Soviet Union)
  - out of 4 possible:
    - 1978 Helena Takalo (Finland)
    - 1978 Zinaida Amosova (Soviet Union)
    - 1987 Anfisa Reztsova (Soviet Union)
    - 1978 Hilkka Riihivuori (Finland)
    - 1982 Hilkka Riihivuori (Finland)
- 2 medals out of 2 possible:
    - 1954 Lyubov Kozyreva (Soviet Union)
    - 1958 Alevtina Kolchina (Soviet Union)
    - 1958 Lyubov Kozyreva (Soviet Union)
    - 1954 Siiri Rantanen (Finland)
    - 1954 Mirja Hietamies (Finland)
    - 1958 Siiri Rantanen (Finland)

== See also ==
- Cross-country skiing at the Winter Olympics
- List of Olympic medalists in cross-country skiing (men)
- List of Olympic medalists in cross-country skiing (women)

== External links and references ==
- https://web.archive.org/web/20050305075135/http://www.sports123.com/cco/index.html
