= List of FIS Cross-Country World Cup women's race winners =

This is a list of individual female winners in FIS Cross-Country World Cup from 1982 season to present.

== Statistics ==
As of 22 March 2026

	Total	World Cup			Stage World Cup	
	Total	Distance	Sprint	Stage Event Overall	Distance	Sprint
Winners	982	500	218	42	161	61
Tie winners	4	3	1	–	–	–
Total winners	986	503	219	42	161	61

- Distance: Competitions of distances longer than 1.8 km
- Sprint: Competitions of distances shorter than 1.8 km
- Stage Event Overall: Overall winners of Stage World Cup events (Ruka Triple, Lillehammer Triple, Tour de Ski, World Cup Final and other Tours)

== Winners ==
As of 24 June 2026

Athletes with “Active” status on their official FIS biography who have competed in World Cup competitions during the current season.
Athletes with “Active” status on their official FIS biography who have not competed in World Cup competitions during the current season.
Athletes with “Active” status on their official FIS biography who are also listed as “Injured”.
Athletes with “Active” status on their official FIS biography who are also listed as “Not Allowed - doping offence”.

Rk.	Name	Bio	Nation	World Cup Seasons	Victories	World Cup			Stage World Cup	
Rk.	Name	Bio	Nation	World Cup Seasons	Victories	Distance	Sprint	Stage Event Overall	Distance	Sprint
1	Marit Bjørgen		Norway	2000–2018	114	41	31	12	21	9
2	Therese Johaug		Norway	2007–2025	89	39	–	11	38	1
3	Justyna Kowalczyk-Tekieli		Poland	2002–2018	50	19	7	5	16	3
4	Yelena Välbe		Russia	1987–1998	45	44	1	–	–	–
5	Bente Skari		Norway	1992–2003	42	25	17	–	–	–
6	Jessie Diggins		United States	2011–2026	31	14	1	3	11	2
7	Virpi Sarasvuo		Finland	1997–2010	27	11	7	2	6	1
8	Petra Majdič		Slovenia	1999–2011	24	1	15	–	3	5
9	Stefania Belmondo		Italy	1989–2002	23	23	–	–	–	–
9	Stina Nilsson		Sweden	2012–2020	23	–	11	1	4	7
11	Maiken Caspersen Falla		Norway	2009–2022	22	–	16	–	–	6
12	Larisa Lazutina		Russia	1984–2002	21	21	–	–	–	–
13	Linn Svahn		Sweden	2019–2026	20	2	11	–	2	5
14	Kateřina Neumannová		Czech Republic	1991–2007	19	16	2	–	1	–
15	Yuliya Chepalova		Russia	1996–2009	18	17	1	–	–	–
15	Jonna Sundling		Sweden	2015–2026	18	3	14	–	–	1
17	Ingvild Flugstad Østberg		Norway	2008–2023	17	2	2	1	11	1
18	Frida Karlsson		Sweden	2019–2026	16	13	–	1	2	–
18	Kristina Šmigun-Vähi		Estonia	1994–2010	16	14	2	–	–	–
20	Manuela Di Centa		Italy	1982–1998	15	15	–	–	–	–
21	Heidi Weng		Norway	2010–2026	14	3	–	3	7	1
22	Kikkan Randall		United States	2001–2018	13	–	11	–	1	1
22	Kristine Stavås Skistad		Norway	2018–2026	13	–	12	–	–	1
22	Lyubov Yegorova		Russia	1984–2003	13	13	–	–	–	–
25	Charlotte Kalla		Sweden	2006–2022	12	5	–	2	4	1
26	Marja-Liisa Kirvesniemi		Finland	1982–1994	11	11	–	–	–	–
27	Brit Pettersen		Norway	1982–1988	10	10	–	–	–	–
28	Ebba Andersson		Sweden	2015–2026	9	8	–	–	1	–
28	Anette Bøe		Norway	1982–1988	9	9	–	–	–	–
30	Arianna Follis		Italy	1996–2011	8	–	3	–	2	3
30	Květa Jeriová		Czechoslovakia	1982–1984	8	8	–	–	–	–
30	Marjo Matikainen-Kallström		Finland	1985–1989	8	8	–	–	–	–
30	Kerttu Niskanen		Finland	2008–2026	8	4	–	–	4	–
34	Trude Dybendahl		Norway	1986–1998	7	6	1	–	–	–
35	Maja Dahlqvist		Sweden	2015–2026	6	–	6	–	–	–
35	Nadine Fähndrich		Switzerland	2016–2026	6	–	4	–	–	2
35	Astrid Uhrenholdt Jacobsen		Norway	2005–2020	6	4	–	–	2	–
35	Krista Pärmäkoski		Finland	2009–2026	6	3	–	–	3	–
35	Kristin Størmer Steira		Norway	2002–2015	6	3	–	–	3	–
35	Natalya Terentyeva		Russia	2014–2022	6	–	1	1	3	1
41	Nina Gavrylyuk		Russia	1987–2003	5	4	1	–	–	–
41	Pirjo Muranen		Finland	1998–2011	5	–	5	–	–	–
41	Valentyna Shevchenko		Ukraine	1995–2017	5	4	–	–	1	–
41	Astrid Øyre Slind		Norway	2008–2026	5	2	–	–	3	–
45	Berit Aunli		Norway	1982–1987	4	4	–	–	–	–
45	Marianne Dahlmo		Norway	1985–1994	4	4	–	–	–	–
45	Olga Danilova		Russia	1991–2002	4	4	–	–	–	–
45	Hanna Falk		Sweden	2007–2021	4	–	3	–	–	1
45	Inger Helene Nybråten		Norway	1982–1995	4	4	–	–	–	–
45	Claudia Nystad		Germany	1998–2015	4	2	–	–	2	–
45	Gabriella Paruzzi		Italy	1991–2006	4	3	1	–	–	–
45	Emma Ribom		Sweden	2019–2026	4	–	4	–	–	–
45	Aino-Kaisa Saarinen		Finland	1998–2018	4	3	–	–	1	–
45	Beckie Scott		Canada	1994–2006	4	3	1	–	–	–
55	Moa Ilar		Sweden	2019–2026	3	3	–	–	–	–
55	Anamarija Lampič		Slovenia	2014–2022	3	–	1	–	–	2
55	Anita Moen		Norway	1987–2003	3	1	2	–	–	–
55	Evi Sachenbacher-Stehle		Germany	1999–2014	3	2	1	–	–	–
55	Raisa Smetanina		Soviet Union	1982–1992	3	3	–	–	–	–
55	Yuliya Stupak		Russia	2014–2022	3	1	1	–	1	–
61	Lina Andersson		Sweden	1999–2011	2	–	2	–	–	–
61	Rosie Brennan		United States	2009–2026	2	1	1	–	–	–
61	Sophie Caldwell Hamilton		United States	2013–2021	2	–	1	–	–	1
61	Chandra Crawford		Canada	2005–2014	2	–	2	–	–	–
61	Vesna Fabjan		Slovenia	2005–2020	2	–	2	–	–	–
61	Ragnhild Gløersen Haga		Norway	2010–2023	2	1	–	–	1	–
61	Johanna Hagström		Sweden	2017–2026	2	–	2	–	–	–
61	Alžbeta Havrančíková		Slovakia	1984–2000	2	2	–	–	–	–
61	Ida Ingemarsdotter		Sweden	2004–2019	2	–	2	–	–	–
61	Anne Jahren		Norway	1982–1990	2	2	–	–	–	–
61	Natalya Matveyeva		Russia	2006–2020	2	–	2	–	–	–
61	Marit Mikkelsplass		Norway	1985–1998	2	2	–	–	–	–
61	Grete Ingeborg Nykkelmo		Norway	1982–1991	2	2	–	–	–	–
61	Anna Olsson		Sweden	1997–2010	2	–	1	–	–	1
61	Marie-Helene Östlund		Sweden	1986–1995	2	2	–	–	–	–
61	Blanka Paulů		Czechoslovakia	1982–1985	2	2	–	–	–	–
61	Riitta-Liisa Roponen		Finland	1999–2024	2	1	–	–	1	–
61	Jaana Savolainen		Finland	1984–1993	2	2	–	–	–	–
61	Karoline Simpson-Larsen		Norway	2019–2026	2	1	–	–	1	–
61	Tamara Tikhonova		Soviet Union	1984–1992	2	2	–	–	–	–
61	Laurien van der Graaff		Switzerland	2008–2022	2	–	1	–	–	1
61	Kaisa Varis		Finland	1996–2006	2	2	–	–	–	–
83	Ella Gjømle Berg		Norway	2000–2011	1	–	1	–	–	–
83	Victoria Carl		Germany	2013–2025	1	1	–	–	–	–
83	Delphine Claudel		France	2017–2026	1	–	–	–	1	–
83	Hanna Erikson		Sweden	2009–2014	1	–	–	–	–	1
83	Simone Greiner-Petter-Memm		East Germany	1987–1988	1	1	–	–	–	–
83	Martine Ek Hagen		Norway	2011–2018	1	1	–	–	–	–
83	Katharina Hennig Dotzler		Germany	2017–2026	1	–	–	–	1	–
83	Jasmi Joensuu		Finland	2014–2026	1	–	–	–	–	1
83	Anna Jönsson Haag		Sweden	2007–2018	1	–	–	–	1	–
83	Anne Kjersti Kalvå		Norway	2013–2026	1	1	–	–	–	–
83	Irina Khazova		Russia	2004–2014	1	1	–	–	–	–
83	Natalya Korostelyova		Russia	2003–2015	1	–	–	–	–	1
83	Evi Kratzer		Switzerland	1982–1989	1	1	–	–	–	–
83	Sophia Laukli		United States	2021–2026	1	–	–	–	1	–
83	Marianna Longa		Italy	2000–2011	1	1	–	–	–	–
83	Johanna Matintalo		Finland	2015–2026	1	1	–	–	–	–
83	Yevgeniya Medvedeva		Russia	1997–2010	1	1	–	–	–	–
83	Svetlana Nageykina		Russia	1986–2007	1	1	–	–	–	–
83	Gaby Nestler		East Germany	1984–1987	1	1	–	–	–	–
83	Mona-Liisa Nousiainen		Finland	2002–2018	1	–	1	–	–	–
83	Jennie Öberg		Sweden	2011–2020	1	–	1	–	–	–
83	Simone Opitz		Germany	1985–1992	1	1	–	–	–	–
83	Hilde Gjermundshaug Pedersen		Norway	1984–2008	1	1	–	–	–	–
83	Alena Procházková		Slovakia	2005–2022	1	–	1	–	–	–
83	Marie Risby		Sweden	1983–1985	1	1	–	–	–	–
83	Marjut Rolig		Finland	1991–1994	1	1	–	–	–	–
83	Coletta Rydzek		Germany	2019–2026	1	–	1	–	–	–
83	Yuliya Shamshurina		Soviet Union	1982–1989	1	1	–	–	–	–
83	Yevgeniya Shapovalova		Russia	2007–2020	1	–	1	–	–	–
83	Alyona Sidko		Russia	2000–2010	1	–	1	–	–	–
83	Sabina Valbusa		Italy	1993–2010	1	1	–	–	–	–
83	Vida Vencienė		Lithuania	1986–1994	1	1	–	–	–	–
83	Lotta Udnes Weng		Norway	2015–2026	1	–	–	–	–	1
83	Tiril Udnes Weng		Norway	2015–2026	1	–	–	–	1	–
83	Olga Zavyalova		Russia	1993–2011	1	1	–	–	–	–
