= Kristen Kvello =

Norwegian cross-country skier

Personal information
- Full name: Kristen Kvello
- Born: 19 October 1931 Nesn Municipalitya, Norway
- Died: 8 September 1998 (aged 66) Selbu Municipality, Norway

Sport
- Sport: Skiing
- Club: Malvik IL, Selbu IL and Mebondens IL

Kristen Kvello (19 October 1931 – 8 September 1998) was a Norwegian cross-country skier and coach, sports official and magazine editor. He was the father of Berit Aunli.

Born in Nesna Municipality on 19 October 1931, Kvello competed for the clubs Malvik IL, Selbu IL and Mebondens IL. He was Norwegian champion in 50 km in 1957, and two times in the relay (1952 and 1953). In 1956 he became world champion in military patrol.

He was head coach for the Norwegian national cross-country team from 1958 to 1964. He was the first person to be appointed all-year-round in this position, and his team gatherings established a pattern also for later generations.

He published the book Ski, stjerner og ungdom in 1965, and was editor of the Norwegian Ski Federation's magazine Skiidrett.

== Cross-country skiing results ==
All results are sourced from the International Ski Federation (FIS).

=== World Championships ===
Year	Age	15 km	30 km	50 km	4 × 10 km relay
1958	26	—	—	DNF	—
