= Brit Pettersen =

Norwegian cross-country skier

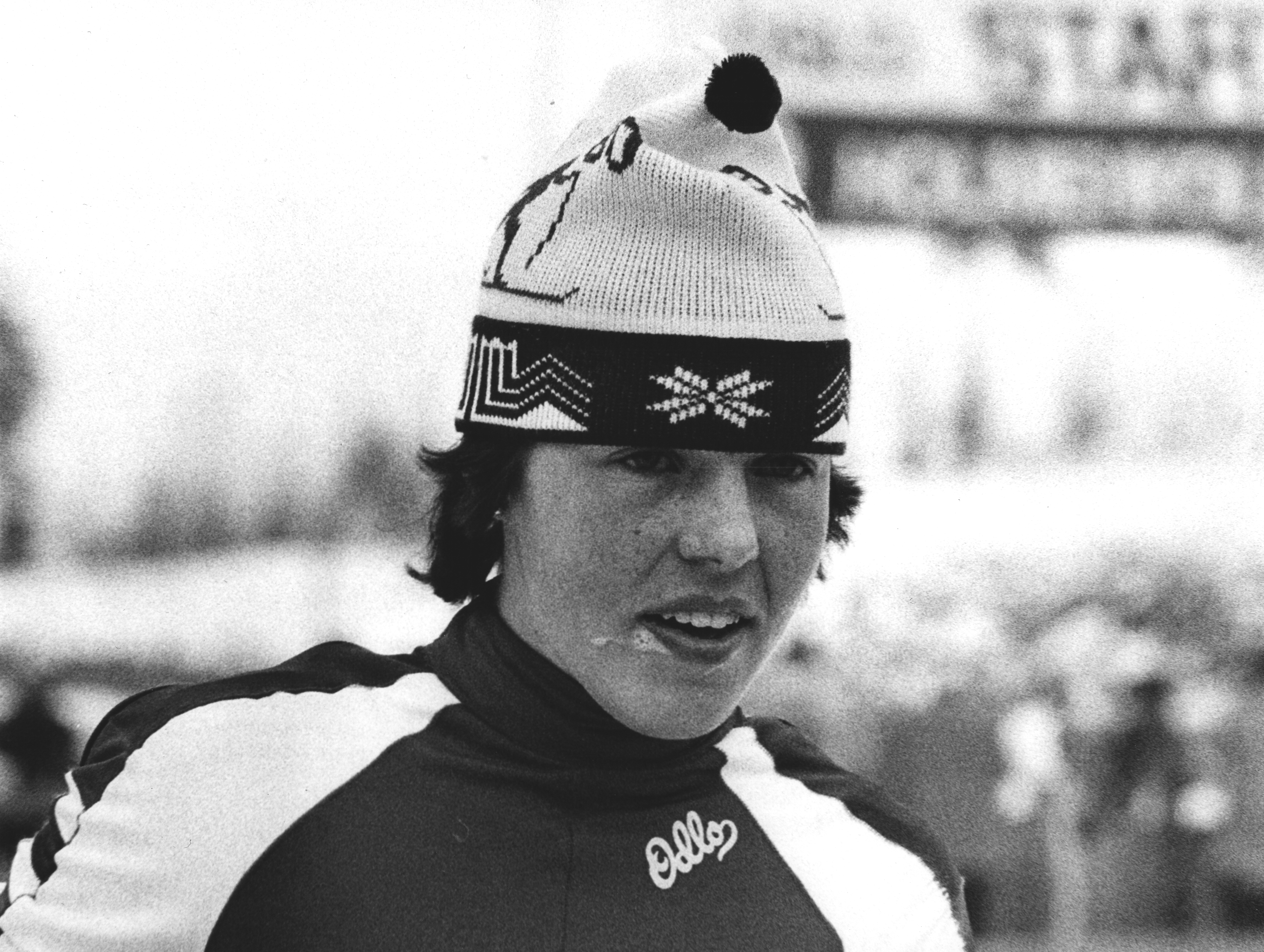
- Brit Pettersen in March, 1980

Personal information
- Nationality: Norway
- Born: 24 November 1961 (age 64) Lillehammer, Norway

Sport
- Sport: Skiing
- Club: Søre Ål IL

World Cup career
- Seasons: 7 – (1982–1988)
- Indiv. starts: 51
- Indiv. podiums: 23
- Indiv. wins: 10
- Team starts: 6
- Team podiums: 6
- Team wins: 5
- Overall titles: 0 – (2nd in 1982, 1983)
Medal record
Women's cross-country skiing
Representing Norway
Olympic Games
Gold medal – first place	1984 Sarajevo	4 × 5 km relay
Bronze medal – third place	1980 Lake Placid	4 × 5 km relay
Bronze medal – third place	1984 Sarajevo	10 km
World Championships
Gold medal – first place	1982 Oslo	4 × 5 km relay
Silver medal – second place	1985 Seefeld	20 km
Bronze medal – third place	1982 Oslo	5 km
Bronze medal – third place	1987 Oberstdorf	10 km classical
Junior World Championships
Gold medal – first place	1980 Örnsköldsvik	4 × 5 km relay

Brit Pettersen Tofte (born 24 November 1961) is a Norwegian former cross-country skier who competed during the 1980s.

Pettersen earned one gold and two bronzes at two Winter Olympic Games. At the FIS Nordic World Ski Championships, she won one gold (4 × 5 km relay - 1982), one silver (20 km - 1985), and two bronzes (5 km - 1982, 10 km - 1987). She also won the 20 km competition at the Holmenkollen ski festival twice (1983 and 1987). In the FIS Cross-Country World Cup, she finished second twice (1981–82, 1982–83) and third twice (1984–85, 1985–86).

She won the Holmenkollen medal in 1986.

In 1986 she won the silver medal at the Norwegian championships in 10 km cross-country running, representing Lillehammer IF.

== Cross-country skiing results ==
All results are sourced from the International Ski Federation (FIS).

=== Olympic Games ===
- 3 medals – (1 gold, 2 bronze)

Year	Age	5 km	10 km	20 km	4 × 5 km relay
1980	18	21	—	—N/a	Bronze
1984	22	5	Bronze	6	Gold
1988	26	11	14	—	—

=== World Championships ===
- 4 medals – (1 gold, 1 silver, 2 bronze)

Year	Age	5 km	10 km	20 km	4 × 5 km relay
1982	20	Bronze	4	11	Gold
1985	23	7	13	Silver	—
1987	25	6	Bronze	—	—

=== World Cup ===
==== Season standings ====
Season	Age	Overall
1982	21	2nd place, silver medalist(s)
1983	22	2nd place, silver medalist(s)
1984	23	8
1985	24	3rd place, bronze medalist(s)
1986	25	3rd place, bronze medalist(s)
1987	26	5
1988	27	41

==== Individual podiums ====
- 10 victories
- 23 podiums

No.	Season	Date	Location	Race	Level	Place
1	1981–82	9 January 1982	Klingenthal, East Germany	10 km Individual	World Cup	2nd
2	1981–82	22 February 1982	Oslo, Norway	5 km Individual	World Championships^{[1]}	3rd
3	1981–82	12 March 1982	Falun, Sweden	20 km Individual	World Cup	1st
4	1981–82	13 March 1982	Falun, Sweden	5 km Individual	World Cup	1st
5	1982–83	8 January 1983	Klingenthal, East Germany	10 km Individual	World Cup	1st
6	1982–83	14 January 1983	Stachy, Czechoslovakia	10 km Individual	World Cup	1st
7	1982–83	19 February 1983	Kavgolovo, Soviet Union	20 km Individual	World Cup	2nd
8	1982–83	25 February 1983	Falun, Sweden	10 km Individual	World Cup	3rd
9	1982–83	5 March 1983	Lahti, Finland	5 km Individual	World Cup	3rd
10	1982–83	12 March 1983	Oslo, Norway	20 km Individual	World Cup	1st
11	1982–83	20 March 1983	Anchorage, United States	10 km Individual	World Cup	2nd
12	1982–83	27 March 1983	Labrador City, Canada	10 km Individual	World Cup	3rd
13	1983–84	9 February 1984	(Socialist Federal Republic of Yugoslavia) Sarajevo, Yugoslavia	10 km Individual	Olympic Games^{[1]}	3rd
14	1984–85	13 December 1984	Val di Sole, Italy	5 km Individual	World Cup	1st
15	1984–85	19 January 1985	Seefeld, Austria	20 km Individual	World Championships^{[1]}	2nd
16	1984–85	2 March 1985	Lahti, Finland	5 km Individual	World Cup	2nd
17	1984–85	16 March 1985	Oslo, Norway	20 km Individual	World Cup	3rd
18	1985–86	13 December 1985	Biwabik, United States	10 km Individual C	World Cup	1st
19	1985–86	15 February 1986	Oberstdorf, West Germany	20 km Individual C	World Cup	2nd
20	1985–86	8 March 1986	Falun, Sweden	30 km Individual C	World Cup	1st
21	1986–87	13 December 1986	Val di Sole, Italy	5 km Individual C	World Cup	1st
22	1986–87	13 February 1987	Oberstdorf, West Germany	10 km Individual C	World Championships^{[1]}	3rd
23	1986–87	21 March 1987	Oslo, Norway	20 km Individual C	World Cup	1st

==== Team podiums ====
- 5 victories
- 6 podiums

No.	Season	Date	Location	Race	Level	Place	Teammates
1	1981–82	24 February 1982	Oslo, Norway	4 × 5 km Relay	World Championships^{[1]}	1st	Bøe / Nybråten / Aunli
2	1983–84	15 February 1984	(Socialist Federal Republic of Yugoslavia) Sarajevo, Yugoslavia	4 × 5 km Relay	Olympic Games^{[1]}	1st	Nybråten / Jahren / Aunli
3	1983–84	26 February 1984	Falun, Sweden	4 × 5 km Relay	World Cup	1st	Bøe / Nybråten / Jahren
4	1985–86	1 March 1986	Lahti, Finland	4 × 5 km Relay C	World Cup	1st	Aunli / Pedersen / Jahren
5	1986–87	1 March 1987	Lahti, Finland	4 × 5 km Relay C	World Cup	2nd	Jahren / Skeime / Dahlmo
6	1986–87	19 March 1987	Oslo, Norway	4 × 5 km Relay C	World Cup	1st	Dybendahl-Hartz / Nybråten / Nykkelmo

Note: ^{1} Until the 1999 World Championships and the 1994 Olympics, World Championship and Olympic races were included in the World Cup scoring system.
