= Nina Skeime =

Norwegian cross-country skier

Personal information
- Nationality: Norway
- Born: 21 May 1962 (age 64)

Sport
- Sport: Skiing
- Club: Kjelsås IL

World Cup career
- Seasons: 9 – (1982–1983, 1985–1991)
- Indiv. starts: 29
- Indiv. podiums: 0
- Team starts: 7
- Team podiums: 7
- Team wins: 0
- Overall titles: 0 – (16th in 1987)
Medal record
Women's cross-country skiing
Representing Norway
World Championships
| Silver medal – second place | 1987 Oberstdorf | 4 × 5 km relay |
| Bronze medal – third place | 1989 Lahti | 4 × 5 km relay |
Junior World Championships
| Gold medal – first place | 1981 Schonach | 3 × 5 km relay |

Nina Skeime Kostøl (born 21 May 1962) is a Norwegian former cross-country skier who competed from 1982 to 1991. She won two medals in the 4 × 5 km relay FIS Nordic World Ski Championships (silver: 1987, bronze: 1989).

Skeime's best individual career finish was sixth in the 10 km event at the 1987 FIS Nordic World Ski Championships in Oberstdorf.

== Cross-country skiing results ==
All results are sourced from the International Ski Federation (FIS).

=== World Championships ===
- 2 medals – (1 silver, 1 bronze)

| Year | Age | 5 km | 10 km classical | 10 km freestyle | 15 km | 20 km | 30 km | 4 × 5 km relay |
|---|---|---|---|---|---|---|---|---|
| 1987 | 24 | 14 | 6 | —N/a | —N/a | 11 | —N/a | Silver |
| 1989 | 26 | —N/a | — | 18 | — | —N/a | 14 | Bronze |
| 1991 | 28 | — | —N/a | 28 | — | —N/a | — | — |

=== World Cup ===
==== Season standings ====
| Season | Age | Overall |
|---|---|---|
| 1982 | 19 | 37 |
| 1983 | 20 | 19 |
| 1985 | 22 | 41 |
| 1986 | 23 | 21 |
| 1987 | 24 | 16 |
| 1988 | 25 | 45 |
| 1989 | 26 | 34 |
| 1990 | 27 | 21 |
| 1991 | 28 | 25 |

==== Team podiums ====
- 7 podiums

| No. | Season | Date | Location | Race | Level | Place | Teammates |
|---|---|---|---|---|---|---|---|
| 1 | 1985–86 | 1 March 1986 | Lahti, Finland | 4 × 5 km Relay C | World Cup | 2nd | Myklebust / Østvold / Dybendahl-Hartz |
| 2 | 1985–86 | 13 March 1986 | Oslo, Norway | 4 × 5 km Relay F | World Cup | 2nd | Dahlmo / Aunli / Jahren |
| 3 | 1986–87 | 17 February 1987 | Oberstdorf, West Germany | 4 × 5 km Relay F | World Championships^{[1]} | 2nd | Dahlmo / Jahren / Bøe |
| 4 | 1986–87 | 1 March 1987 | Lahti, Finland | 4 × 5 km Relay C/F | World Cup | 2nd | Pettersen / Jahren / Dahlmo |
| 5 | 1986–87 | 19 March 1987 | Oslo, Norway | 4 × 5 km Relay C | World Cup | 3rd | Dahlmo / Bøe / Jahren |
| 6 | 1988–89 | 23 February 1989 | Lahti, Finland | 4 × 5 km Relay C/F | World Championships^{[1]} | 3rd | Nybråten / Jahren / Dahlmo |
| 7 | 1990–91 | 15 March 1991 | Oslo, Norway | 4 × 5 km Relay C/F | World Cup | 3rd | Elveos / Wold / Hegge |

Note: ^{1} Until the 1999 World Championships, World Championship races were included in the World Cup scoring system.
