= Anne Jahren =

Norwegian cross-country skier

Personal information
- Nationality: Norway
- Born: 20 June 1963 (age 63) Bærum, Norway

Sport
- Sport: Skiing
- Club: Bærums Skiklub

World Cup career
- Seasons: 9 – (1982–1990)
- Indiv. starts: 57
- Indiv. podiums: 14
- Indiv. wins: 2
- Team starts: 14
- Team podiums: 14
- Team wins: 7
- Overall titles: 0 – (3rd in 1984)
Medal record
Women's cross-country skiing
Representing Norway
Olympic Games
Gold medal – first place	1984 Sarajevo	4 × 5 km relay
Silver medal – second place	1988 Calgary	4 × 5 km relay
Bronze medal – third place	1984 Sarajevo	20 km
World Championships
Gold medal – first place	1987 Oberstdorf	10 km classical
Silver medal – second place	1985 Seefeld	4 × 5 km relay
Silver medal – second place	1987 Oberstdorf	4 × 5 km relay
Bronze medal – third place	1989 Lahti	4 × 5 km relay
Junior World Championships
Gold medal – first place	1981 Schonach	5 km
Gold medal – first place	1981 Schonach	3 × 5 km relay
Gold medal – first place	1982 Murau	3 × 5 km relay

Anne Jahren (born 20 June 1963) is a Norwegian former cross-country skier who competed from 1982 to 1990. She won a complete set of medals at the Winter Olympics with a gold in the 4 × 5 km relay (1984), a silver in the 4 × 5 km relay (1988), and a bronze in the 20 km (1984).

Jahren also won four medals at the FIS Nordic World Ski Championships, including one gold (10 km: 1987), two silvers (4 × 5 km relay: 1985, 1987), and one bronze (4 × 5 km relay: 1989). She also finished 13th in the women's Adelskalender in the Norwegian skiing Championships. Representing Bærums Skiklub, Jahren also won two World Cup events in her career (1986, 1987).

In 1984 she won the silver medal at the Norwegian championships in 10 km cross-country running, representing IL Tyrving.

She has her education from the Norwegian School of Sport Sciences.

== Cross-country skiing results ==
All results are sourced from the International Ski Federation (FIS).

=== Olympic Games ===
- 3 medals – (1 gold, 1 silver, 1 bronze)

Year	Age	5 km	10 km	20 km	4 × 5 km relay
1984	20	7	5	Bronze	Gold
1988	24	4	16	—	Silver

=== World Championships ===
- 4 medals – (1 gold, 2 silver, 1 bronze)

Year	Age	5 km	10 km classical	10 km freestyle	15 km	20 km	30 km	4 × 5 km relay
1985	21	5	5	—N/a	—N/a	—	—N/a	Silver
1987	23	8	Gold	—N/a	—N/a	8	—N/a	Silver
1989	25	—N/a	16	—	5	—N/a	—	Bronze

=== World Cup ===
==== Season standings ====
Season	Age	Overall
1982	19	34
1983	20	5
1984	21	3rd place, bronze medalist(s)
1985	22	11
1986	23	4
1987	24	8
1988	25	17
1989	26	10
1990	27	15

==== Individual podiums ====
- 2 victories
- 14 podiums

No.	Season	Date	Location	Race	Level	Place
1	1982–83	14 January 1983	Stachy, Czechoslovakia	10 km Individual	World Cup	2nd
2	1982–83	10 February 1983	(Socialist Federal Republic of Yugoslavia) Igman, Yugoslavia	5 km Individual	World Cup	2nd
3	1982–83	19 February 1983	Kavgolovo, Soviet Union	20 km Individual	World Cup	3rd
4	1982–83	20 March 1983	Anchorage, United States	10 km Individual	World Cup	3rd
5	1983–84	17 December 1983	Autrans, France	10 km Individual	World Cup	3rd
6	1983–84	18 February 1984	(Socialist Federal Republic of Yugoslavia) Sarajevo, Yugoslavia	20 km Individual	Olympic Games ^{[1]}	3rd
7	1983–84	24 March 1984	Murmansk, Soviet Union	10 km Individual	World Cup	3rd
8	1985–86	22 February 1986	Kavgolovo, Soviet Union	10 km Individual C	World Cup	1st
9	1985–86	2 March 1986	Lahti, Finland	5 km Individual C	World Cup	2nd
10	1985–86	15 March 1986	Oslo, Norway	10 km Individual F	World Cup	3rd
11	1986–87	13 February 1987	Oberstdorf, West Germany	10 km Individual C	World Championships^{[1]}	1st
12	1986–87	21 March 1987	Oslo, Norway	20 km Individual C	World Cup	3rd
13	1988–89	13 January 1989	Klingenthal, East Germany	10 km Individual C	World Cup	3rd
14	1988–89	4 March 1989	Oslo, Norway	10 km + 10 km Pursuit C/F	World Cup	3rd

==== Team podiums ====
- 7 victories
- 14 podiums

No.	Season	Date	Location	Race	Level	Place	Teammates
1	1983–84	15 February 1984	(Socialist Federal Republic of Yugoslavia) Sarajevo, Yugoslavia	4 × 5 km Relay	Olympic Games^{[1]}	1st	Nybråten / Pettersen / Aunli
2	1983–84	26 February 1984	Falun, Sweden	4 × 5 km Relay	World Cup	1st	Bøe / Nybråten / Pettersen
3	1984–85	22 January 1985	Seefeld, Austria	4 × 5 km Relay	World Championships^{[1]}	2nd	Bøe / Nykkelmo / Aunli
4	1984–85	17 March 1985	Oslo, Norway	4 × 5 km Relay	World Cup	1st	Nykkelmo / Aunli / Bøe
5	1985–86	1 March 1986	Lahti, Finland	4 × 5 km Relay C	World Cup	1st	Aunli / Pettersen / Pedersen
6	1985–86	13 March 1986	Oslo, Norway	4 × 5 km Relay F	World Cup	2nd	Dahlmo / Skeime / Aunli
7	1986–87	17 February 1987	Oberstdorf, West Germany	4 × 5 km Relay F	World Championships^{[1]}	2nd	Dahlmo / Skeime / Bøe
8	1986–87	1 March 1987	Lahti, Finland	4 × 5 km Relay C/F	World Cup	2nd	Pettersen / Skeime / Dahlmo
9	1986–87	19 March 1987	Oslo, Norway	4 × 5 km Relay C	World Cup	3rd	Dahlmo / Bøe / Skeime
10	1987–88	21 February 1988	Calgary, Canada	4 × 5 km Relay F	Olympic Games^{[1]}	2nd	Dybendahl-Hartz / Wold / Dahlmo
11	1987–88	13 March 1988	Falun, Sweden	4 × 5 km Relay C	World Cup	1st	Dybendahl-Hartz / Nybråten / Dahlmo
12	1988–89	23 February 1989	Lahti, Finland	4 × 5 km Relay C/F	World Championships^{[1]}	3rd	Nybråten / Skeime / Dahlmo
13	1988–89	12 March 1989	Falun, Sweden	4 × 5 km Relay C	World Cup	1st	Dahlmo / Nybråten / Dybendahl-Hartz
14	1989–90	4 March 1990	Lahti, Finland	4 × 5 km Relay F	World Cup	1st	Pedersen / Nybråten / Dybendahl-Hartz

Note: ^{1} Until the 1999 World Championships and the 1994 Olympics, World Championship and Olympic races were included in the World Cup scoring system.
