= Berit Aunli =

Norwegian cross-country skier

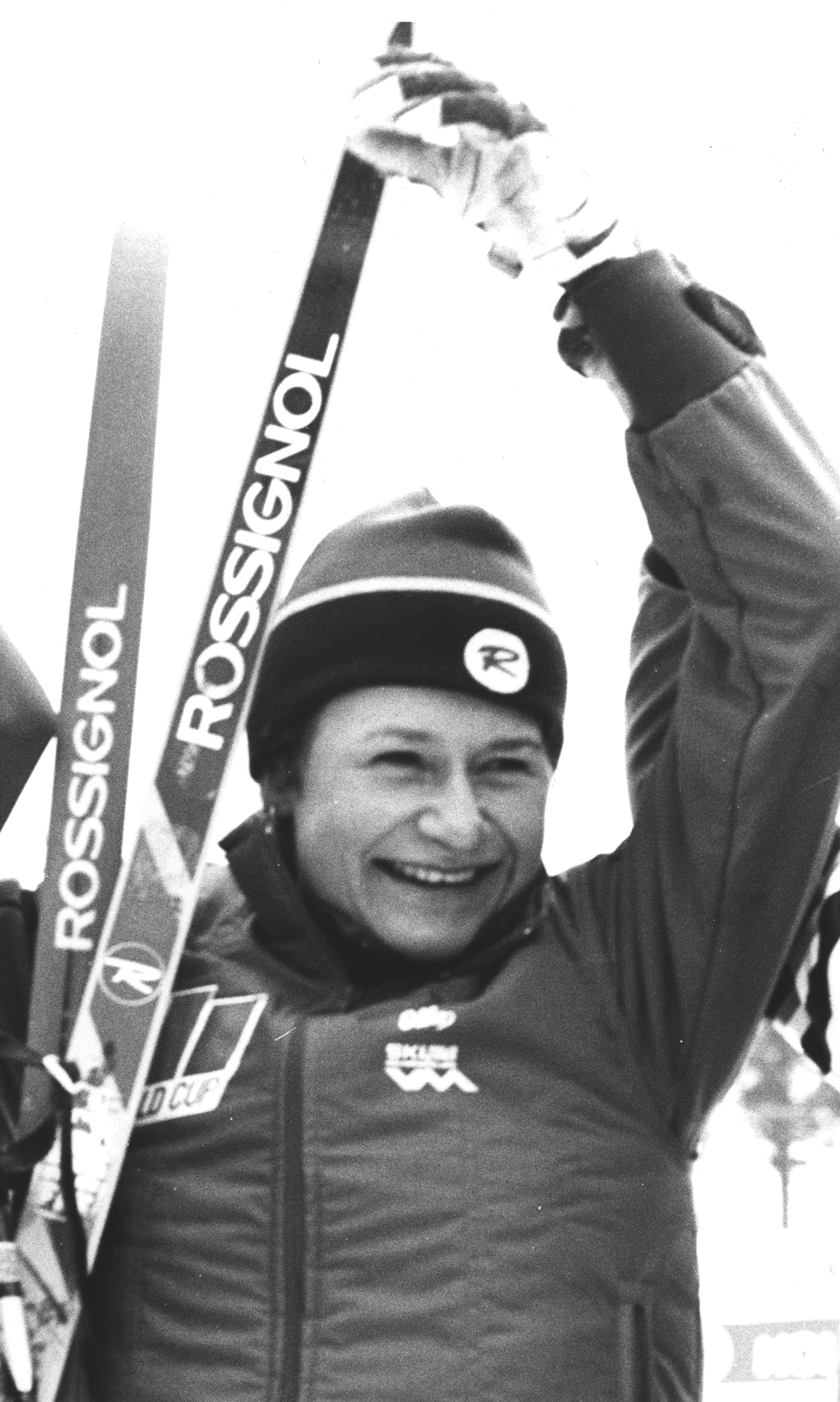
- Berit Aunli in March, 1981

Personal information
- Nationality: Norway
- Born: 9 June 1956 (age 70) Stjørdal Municipality, Norway
- Spouse: Ove Aunli (m. 1979)

Sport
- Sport: Skiing
- Club: Strindheim IL

World Cup career
- Seasons: 5 – (1982, 1984–1987)
- Indiv. starts: 26
- Indiv. podiums: 10
- Indiv. wins: 4
- Team starts: 6
- Team podiums: 6
- Team wins: 4
- Overall titles: 1 – (1982)
Medal record
Women's cross-country skiing
Representing Norway
International nordic ski competitions
Event	1st	2nd	3rd
Olympic Games	1	1	1
World Championships	3	2	0
Total	4	3	1
Olympic Games
Gold medal – first place	1984 Sarajevo	4 × 5 km relay
Silver medal – second place	1984 Sarajevo	5 km
Bronze medal – third place	1980 Lake Placid	4 × 5 km relay
World Championships
Gold medal – first place	1982 Oslo	5 km
Gold medal – first place	1982 Oslo	10 km
Gold medal – first place	1982 Oslo	4 × 5 km relay
Silver medal – second place	1982 Oslo	20 km
Silver medal – second place	1985 Seefeld	4 × 5 km relay
- Updated on 5 January 2019

Berit Kristine Aunli (née Kvello; born 9 June 1956) is a Norwegian former cross-country skier. She is a World (1982) and Olympic (1984) champion and won a total of 15 Norwegian titles (1977—1982).

== Personal life ==
Aunli has five siblings. Her father, Kristen Kvello, was a Norwegian cross-country skiing champion and a former national coach.

She was inspired by fellow cross-country skier Berit Mørdre and marathon runner Grete Waitz. She met her future husband, Ove Aunli, while skiing when she was 15. They married in 1979 and have a son, Odd. A statue of the two of them was erected in Kyrksæterøra in June 2023.

== Career ==
Aunli began training seriously in 1975 and competed in her first senior season in 1976, when she was 18. At the 1976 Winter Olympics, she placed 17th in the women's 5 km and 18th in the women's 10 km.

At the 1978 World Championships, she placed 6th in both the 10 km and 20 km events, the best result of the Norwegian women. She became pregnant that year, and her husband received death threats as he was viewed as "ruining" her promising career. Aunli's pregnancy ended in a miscarriage, which she found mentally difficult.

She won her first international championship medal as a member of the Norwegian team that won the bronze medal at the 4 × 5 km relay at the 1980 Winter Olympics. However, she performed much more poorly in her individual events (13th and 18th place) due to illness, and she was criticized for this in Norwegian newspapers.

Aunli had originally intended to retire after the 1980 Olympics, but she continued to compete after being disappointed in her performance there. Her real international breakthrough came at the 1982 FIS Nordic World Ski Championships, where her father was an announcer. She won three gold medals in the 5 km, 10 km and 4 × 5 km relay races, in addition to a silver medal in the 20 km classic, where she was beaten by Raisa Smetanina by 3.4 seconds. She also became the first winner of an official Cross-Country World Cup after her overall victory in the 1981–82 FIS Cross-Country World Cup.

She took the 1983 season off as she wanted a break from competing and to have a child. Six weeks after giving birth to her son, she began skiing again. That year, she was awarded the Holmenkollen medal (shared with Tom Sandberg).

At the 1984 Winter Olympics in Sarajevo, she won two medals: gold in the 4 × 5 km relay and silver in 5 km.

She won a silver in the 4 × 5 km relay at the 1985 World Championships. In her individual events, she finished twice in 4th place and once in 6th. That year, she was awarded Morgenbladet's gold medal.

Over her career, she won a total of 15 Norwegian Championships titles, 11 individual and 4 relays. She represented the club Strindheim IL.

Aunli was critical of media coverage of skiers during her career. She felt the press criticism of the older Norwegian women who competed with her at the 1976 Olympics, who did not have as good of results as the Soviet and Finnish skiers, was unduly harsh. She also thought that Norwegians did not take women's cross-country skiing seriously until the early 1980s, when they were highly successful at the World Championships. In a 1986 interview, she recalled examples of a race being advertised as starting when the men's event began, after all the women had competed, as well as letters to the editor in Adresseavisen in 1980 debating whether women should compete at all. Aunli also said that girls had received less support from the Norwegian Ski Federation than boys, though she added, "Today we are treated equally".

== Cross-country skiing results ==
All results are sourced from the International Ski Federation (FIS).

=== Olympic Games ===
- 3 medals – (1 gold, 1 silver, 1 bronze)

Year	Age	5 km	10 km	20 km	4 × 5 km relay
1976	19	17	18	—N/a	5
1980	23	14	13	—N/a	Bronze
1984	27	Silver	4	—	Gold

=== World Championships ===
- 5 medals – (3 gold, 2 silver)

Year	Age	5 km	10 km	20 km	4 × 5 km relay
1978	21	7	6	6	5
1980	23	—N/a	—N/a	7	—N/a
1982	25	Gold	Gold	Silver	Gold
1985	28	4	6	4	Silver

=== World Cup ===
==== Season standings ====
Season	Age	Overall
1982	26	1st place, gold medalist(s)
1984	28	7
1985	29	14
1986	30	15
1987	31	41

==== Individual podiums ====
- 4 victories
- 10 podiums

No.	Season	Date	Location	Race	Level	Place
1	1981–82	15 January 1982	La Bresse, France	5 km Individual	World Cup	2nd
2	1981–82	19 February 1982	Oslo, Norway	10 km Individual	World Championships^{[1]}	1st
3	1981–82	22 February 1982	Oslo, Norway	5 km Individual	World Championships^{[1]}	1st
4	1981–82	26 February 1982	Oslo, Norway	5 km Individual	World Championships^{[1]}	2nd
5	1981–82	6 March 1982	Lahti, Finland	10 km Individual	World Cup	2nd
6	1981–82	28 March 1982	Štrbské Pleso, Czechoslovakia	10 km Individual	World Cup	2nd
7	1981–82	13 April 1982	Kiruna, Sweden	5 km Individual	World Cup	2nd
8	1983–84	12 February 1984	(Socialist Federal Republic of Yugoslavia) Sarajevo, Yugoslavia	5 km Individual	Olympic Games^{[1]}	2nd
9	1983–84	3 March 1984	Lahti, Finland	5 km Individual	World Cup	1st
10	1984–85	18 December 1984	Davos, Switzerland	10 km Individual	World Cup	1st

==== Team podiums ====
- 4 victories
- 6 podiums

No.	Season	Date	Location	Race	Level	Place	Teammates
1	1981–82	24 February 1982	Oslo, Norway	4 × 5 km Relay	World Championships^{[1]}	1st	Bøe / Nybråten / Pettersen
2	1983–84	15 February 1984	(Socialist Federal Republic of Yugoslavia) Sarajevo, Yugoslavia	4 × 5 km Relay	Olympic Games^{[1]}	1st	Nybråten / Jahren / Pettersen
3	1984–85	22 February 1985	Seefeld, Austria	4 × 5 km Relay	World Championships^{[1]}	2nd	Bøe / Jahren / Nykkelmo
4	1984–85	17 March 1985	Oslo, Norway	4 × 5 km Relay	World Cup	1st	Nykkelmo / Jahren / Bøe
5	1985–86	1 March 1986	Lahti, Finland	4 × 5 km Relay C	World Cup	1st	Pettersen / Pedersen / Jahren
6	1985–86	13 March 1986	Oslo, Norway	4 × 5 km Relay F	World Cup	2nd	Dahlmo / Skeime / Jahren

Note: ^{1} Until the 1999 World Championships and the 1994 Winter Olympics, World Championship and Olympic races were included in the World Cup scoring system.

Preceded by Tom Lund	Norwegian Sportsperson of the Year; 1982	Succeeded by Grete Waitz
