= Anette Bøe =

Norwegian cross-country skier

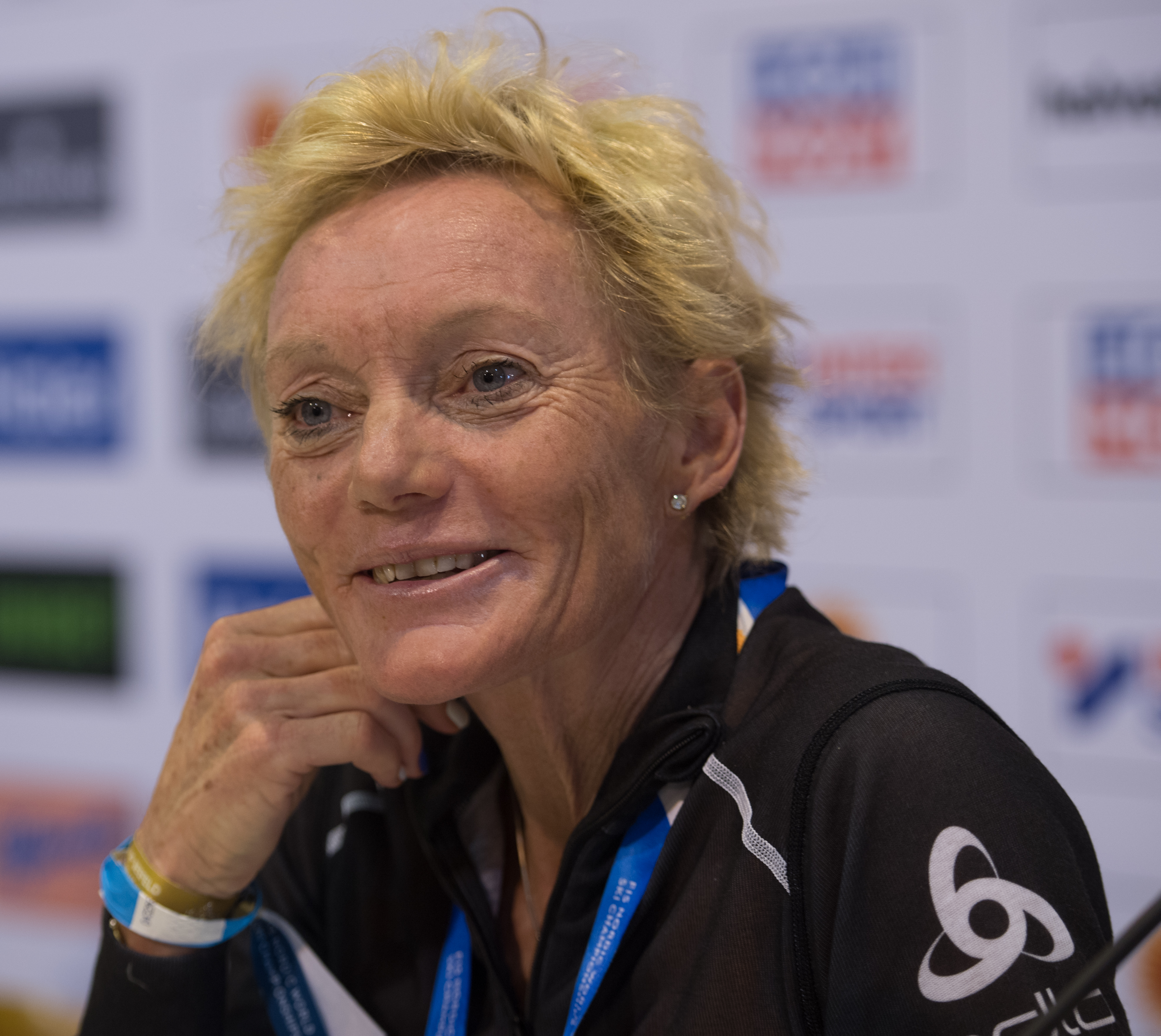
- Anette Bøe in Seefeld, February 2019

Personal information
- Nationality: Norway
- Born: 5 November 1957 (age 68) Larvik, Norway

Sport
- Sport: Skiing
- Club: Bjerke IL

World Cup career
- Seasons: 7 – (1982–1988)
- Indiv. starts: 40
- Indiv. podiums: 12
- Indiv. wins: 9
- Team starts: 8
- Team podiums: 8
- Team wins: 4
- Overall titles: 1 – (1985)
Medal record
Women's cross-country skiing
Representing Norway
Olympic Games
Bronze medal – third place	1980 Lake Placid	4 × 5 km relay
World Championships
Gold medal – first place	1982 Oslo	4 × 5 km relay
Gold medal – first place	1985 Seefeld	5 km
Gold medal – first place	1985 Seefeld	10 km
Silver medal – second place	1985 Seefeld	4 × 5 km relay
Silver medal – second place	1987 Oberstdorf	4 × 5 km relay
Bronze medal – third place	1985 Seefeld	20 km

Anette Bøe (born 5 November 1957) is a Norwegian former cross-country skier. Bøe won her first international medal when she took the bronze at the 1980 Winter Olympics in Lake Placid on the 4 × 5 km relay. She won the 20 km event at the Holmenkollen ski festival twice, in 1984 and 1985.

Bøe's biggest successes as a cross-country skier were at the FIS Nordic World Ski Championships, where she took gold in the 4 × 5 km relay (1982) and the 10 km (1985), silver in the 4 × 5 km relay (1985, 1987), and a bronze in the 20 km (1985). She also won the FIS Cross-Country World Cup in 1985.

Bøe was awarded the Holmenkollen medal in 1985 (shared with Per Bergerud and Gunde Svan).

In 2000, she received the Egebergs Ærespris for her achievements in cross-country skiing and ice hockey.

== Cross-country skiing results ==
All results are sourced from the International Ski Federation (FIS).

=== Olympic Games ===
- 1 medal – (1 bronze)

Year	Age	5 km	10 km	20 km	4 × 5 km relay
1980	22	24	—	—N/a	Bronze
1988	30	—	—	20	—

=== World Championships ===
- 6 medals – (3 gold, 2 silver, 1 bronze)

Year	Age	5 km	10 km	20 km	4 × 5 km relay
1980	22	—N/a	—N/a	10	—N/a
1982	24	4	5	8	Gold
1985	27	Gold	Gold	Bronze	Silver
1987	29	5	19	6	Silver

=== World Cup ===
==== Season standings ====
Season	Age	Overall
1982	25	5
1983	26	14
1984	27	10
1985	28	1st place, gold medalist(s)
1986	29	40
1987	30	6
1988	31	32

==== Individual podiums ====
- 9 victories
- 12 podiums

No.	Season	Date	Location	Race	Level	Place
1	1981–82	6 March 1982	Lahti, Finland	10 km Individual	World Cup	1st
2	1981–82	12 March 1982	Falun, Sweden	20 km Individual	World Cup	3rd
3	1983–84	8 March 1984	Oslo, Norway	20 km Individual	World Cup	1st
4	1983–84	17 March 1984	Štrbské Pleso, Czechoslovakia	5 km Individual	World Cup	2nd
5	1984–85	19 January 1985	Seefeld, Austria	10 km Individual	World Championships^{[1]}	1st
6	1984–85	21 January 1985	Seefeld, Austria	5 km Individual	World Championships^{[1]}	1st
7	1984–85	26 January 1985	Seefeld, Austria	20 km Individual	World Championships^{[1]}	3rd
8	1984–85	14 February 1985	Klingenthal, East Germany	10 km Individual	World Cup	1st
9	1984–85	18 February 1985	Nové Město, Czechoslovakia	5 km Individual	World Cup	1st
10	1984–85	9 March 1985	Falun, Sweden	10 km Individual	World Cup	1st
11	1984–85	16 March 1985	Oslo, Norway	20 km Individual	World Cup	1st
12	1986–87	7 March 1987	Falun, Sweden	30 km Individual F	World Cup	1st

==== Team podiums ====
- 4 victories
- 8 podiums

No.	Season	Date	Location	Race	Level	Place	Teammates
1	1981–82	24 February 1982	Oslo, Norway	4 × 5 km Relay	World Championships^{[1]}	1st	Nybråten / Aunli / Pettersen
2	1983–84	26 February 1984	Falun, Sweden	4 × 5 km Relay	World Cup	1st	Nybråten / Jahren / Pettersen
3	1984–85	22 January 1985	Seefeld, Austria	4 × 5 km Relay	World Championships^{[1]}	2nd	Jahren / Nykkelmo / Aunli
4	1984–85	10 March 1985	Falun, Sweden	4 × 5 km Relay	World Cup	1st	Nykkelmo / Dybendahl-Hartz / Dahlmo
5	1984–85	17 March 1985	Oslo, Norway	4 × 5 km Relay	World Cup	1st	Nykkelmo / Jahren / Aunli
6	1986–87	17 February 1987	Oberstdorf, West Germany	4 × 5 km Relay F	World Championships^{[1]}	2nd	Dahlmo / Skeime / Jahren
7	1986–87	19 March 1987	Oslo, Norway	4 × 5 km Relay C	World Cup	3rd	Dahlmo / Skeime / Jahren
8	1987–88	13 March 1988	Falun, Sweden	4 × 5 km Relay C	World Cup	3rd	Elveos / Wold / Pedersen

Note: ^{1} Until the 1999 World Championships, World Championship races were included in the World Cup scoring system.

Awards
Preceded by Anita Andreassen	Egebergs Ærespris; 2000	Succeeded by Anders Aukland
