= Grete Ingeborg Nykkelmo =

Norwegian cross-country skier and biathlete

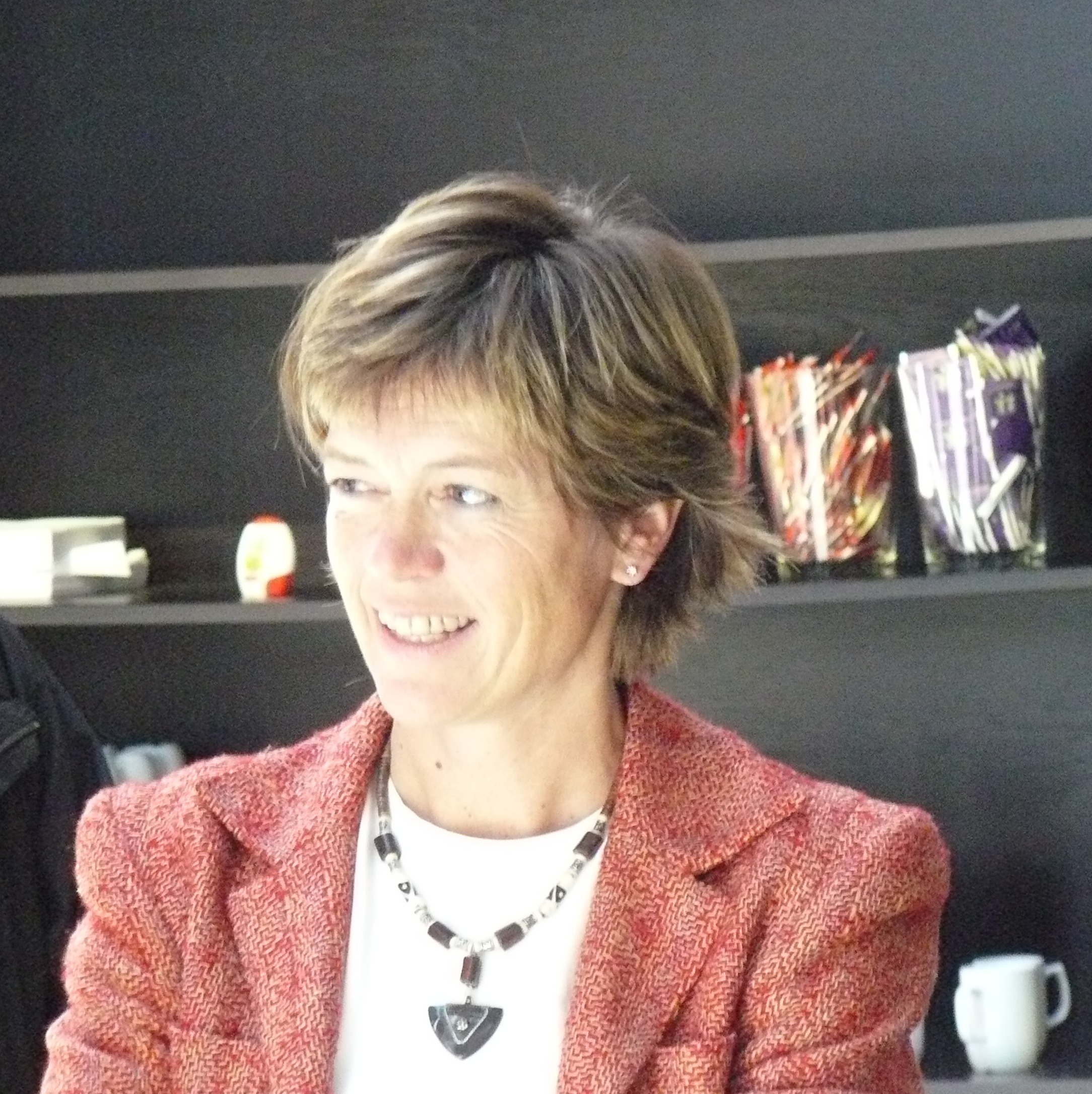

Personal information
- Nationality: Norway
- Born: 25 December 1961 (age 64) Trondheim, Norway
- Spouse: Vegard Ulvang

Sport
- Sport: Skiing
- Club: Selbu IL

World Cup career
- Seasons: 8 – (1982–1987, 1989, 1991)
- Indiv. starts: 36
- Indiv. podiums: 9
- Indiv. wins: 2
- Team starts: 5
- Team podiums: 5
- Team wins: 3
- Overall titles: 0 – (2nd in 1985)
Medal record
Representing Norway
Women's cross-country skiing
World Championships
Gold medal – first place	1985 Seefeld	20 km
Silver medal – second place	1985 Seefeld	4 × 5 km relay
Bronze medal – third place	1985 Seefeld	5 km
Junior World Championships
Gold medal – first place	1980 Örnsköldsvik	3 × 5 km relay
Women's biathlon
World Championships
Gold medal – first place	1991 Lahti	7.5 km sprint
Silver medal – second place	1990 Oslo	3 × 7.5 km relay
Silver medal – second place	1991 Lahti	15 km individual
Silver medal – second place	1991 Lahti	3 × 7.5 km relay

Grete Ingeborg Nykkelmo (born 25 December 1961) is a former biathlete and cross-country skier from Norway. She competed in both events from 1982 to 1992 and competed in biathlon at the 1992 Winter Olympics.

== Personal life ==
Nykkelmo is married to cross-country skier Vegard Ulvang, and they have two children, Nora and Runa. She grew up in Selbu, where skiing was a common method of transit in the winter.

She studied civil engineering at the Norwegian Institute of Technology. After her sports career, she worked in engineering and marketing, and since May 2017 has worked at the nonprofit Ungt Entreprenørskap.

== Sports career ==
Nykkelmo watched the 1974 Norwegian Championships, which were held in Selbu, which influenced her to train in competitive skiing. She joined the junior national team in 1978. She became good friends with other athletes on the team and credited the friendly environment as a factor in the success of Norwegian cross-country skiers.

She won four medals at the 1985 FIS Nordic World Ski Championships in Seefeld with a gold in the 20 km, a silver in the 4 × 5 km relay, and bronzes in the 5 km and 10 km. At the 1991 Biathlon World Championships in Lahti, she won a gold medal in the 7.5 km sprint and silvers in the 15 km individual and the 3 × 7.5 km relay.

In 1980, she became Norwegian champion in 10 km cross-country running, representing Selbu IL. On the same distance she won one silver medal (1981) and three bronze medals (1979, 1982, 1985).

Nykkelmo won the Egebergs Ærespris in 1990 for her achievements.

At the 1992 Winter Olympics in Albertville, she competed in the women's 7.5 km sprint, where she finished 31st, and the women's 15 km individual, where she finished 18th.

After she finished her competitive career, Nykkelmo became a board member of the Norwegian Sports Confederation from 1999 to 2003.

== Cross-country skiing results ==
All results are sourced from the International Ski Federation (FIS).

=== World Championships ===
- 4 medals – (1 gold, 1 silver, 2 bronze)

Year	Age	5 km	10 km classical	10 km freestyle	15 km	20 km	30 km	4 × 5 km relay
1985	23	Bronze	Bronze	—N/a	—N/a	Gold	—N/a	Silver
1987	25	—	—	—N/a	—N/a	19	—N/a	—
1989	27	—N/a	26	—	—	—N/a	15	—

=== World Cup ===
==== Season standings ====
Season	Age	Overall
1982	20	14
1983	21	20
1984	22	15
1985	23	2nd place, silver medalist(s)
1986	24	29
1987	25	9
1989	28	37
1991	29	33

==== Individual podiums ====
- 2 victories
- 9 podiums

No.	Season	Date	Location	Race	Level	Place
1	1984–85	18 December 1984	Davos, Switzerland	10 km Individual	World Cup	2nd
2	1984–85	19 January 1985	Seefeld, Austria	10 km Individual	World Championships^{[1]}	3rd
3	1984–85	21 January 1985	Seefeld, Austria	5 km Individual	World Championships^{[1]}	3rd
4	1984–85	26 January 1985	Seefeld, Austria	20 km Individual	World Championships^{[1]}	1st
5	1984–85	14 February 1985	Klingenthal, East Germany	10 km Individual	World Cup	2nd
6	1984–85	9 March 1985	Falun, Sweden	10 km Individual	World Cup	2nd
7	1984–85	16 March 1985	Oslol, Norway	20 km Individual	World Cup	2nd
8	1986–87	13 December 1986	Val di Sole, Italy	5 km Individual C	World Cup	3rd
9	1986–87	20 December 1986	Cogne, Italy	20 km Individual F	World Cup	1st

==== Team podiums ====
- 3 victories
- 5 podiums

No.	Season	Date	Location	Race	Level	Place	Teammates
1	1984–85	22 January 1985	Seefeld, Austria	4 × 5 km Relay	World Championships^{[1]}	2nd	Bøe / Jahren / Aunli
2	1984–85	10 March 1985	Falun, Sweden	4 × 5 km Relay	World Cup	1st	Dybendahl-Hartz / Dahlmo / Bøe
3	1984–85	17 March 1985	Oslo, Norway	4 × 5 km Relay	World Cup	1st	Jahren / Aunli / Bøe
4	1985–86	13 March 1986	Oslo, Norway	4 × 5 km Relay F	World Cup	3rd	Nybråten / Pedersen / Tangen
5	1986–87	19 March 1987	Oslo, Norway	4 × 5 km Relay C	World Cup	1st	Dybendahl-Hartz / Pettersen / Nybråten

Note: ^{1} Until the 1999 World Championships, World Championship races were included in the World Cup scoring system.

Preceded by Ragnhild Bratberg	Egebergs Ærespris; 1990	Succeeded by Birger Ruud
