= Inger Helene Nybråten =

Norwegian cross-country skier

Personal information
- Nationality: Norway
- Born: 8 December 1960 (age 65) Fagernes, Norway

Sport
- Sport: Skiing
- Club: Skrautvål IL

World Cup career
- Seasons: 12 – (1982–1984, 1986, 1988–1995)
- Indiv. starts: 84
- Indiv. podiums: 11
- Indiv. wins: 4
- Team starts: 23
- Team podiums: 23
- Team wins: 10
- Overall titles: 0 – (4th in 1984)
Medal record
Women's cross-country skiing
Representing Norway
Olympic Games
Gold medal – first place	1984 Sarajevo	4 × 5 km relay
Silver medal – second place	1992 Albertville	4 × 5 km relay
Silver medal – second place	1994 Lillehammer	4 × 5 km relay
World Championships
Gold medal – first place	1982 Oslo	4 × 5 km relay
Silver medal – second place	1995 Thunder Bay	4 × 5 km relay
Bronze medal – third place	1989 Lahti	4 × 5 km relay
Bronze medal – third place	1991 Val di Fiemme	4 × 5 km relay
Bronze medal – third place	1993 Falun	4 × 5 km relay
Bronze medal – third place	1995 Thunder Bay	15 km classical

Inger Helene Nybråten (born 8 December 1960) is a Norwegian former cross-country skier who competed in the 1980s and 1990s.

She won three relay medals at the Winter Olympics with a gold (1984) and two silvers (1992, 1994). Nybråten's biggest successes were at the FIS Nordic World Ski Championships, where she earned one gold (4 × 5 km relay: 1982), one silver (4 × 5 km relay: 1995), and four bronzes (15 km: 1995, 4 × 5 km relay: 1989, 1991, and 1993). She also won six World Cup events from 1984 to 1995.

She represented the club Skrautvål IL, in Skrautvål.

== Cross-country skiing results ==
All results are sourced from the International Ski Federation (FIS).

=== Olympic Games ===
- 3 medals – (1 gold, 2 silver, 4 bronze)

Year	Age	5 km	10 km	15 km	Pursuit	20 km	30 km	4 × 5 km relay
1984	23	5	—	—N/a	—N/a	11	—N/a	Gold
1988	27	6	6	—N/a	—N/a	—	—N/a	—
1992	31	5	—N/a	7	7	—N/a	13	Silver
1994	33	5	—N/a	—	DNS	—N/a	7	Silver

=== World Championships ===
- 6 medals – (1 gold, 1 silver, 4 bronze)

Year	Age	5 km	10 km classical	10 km freestyle	15 km	Pursuit	20 km	30 km	4 × 5 km relay
1982	21	—	9	—N/a	—N/a	—N/a	—	—N/a	Gold
1989	28	—N/a	9	—	8	—N/a	—N/a	—	Bronze
1991	30	6	—N/a	—	16	—N/a	—N/a	—	Bronze
1993	32	12	—N/a	—N/a	17	24	—N/a	—	Bronze
1995	34	6	—N/a	—N/a	Bronze	DNS	—N/a	—	Silver

=== World Cup ===
==== Season standings ====
Season	Age	Overall
1982	22	9
1983	23	7
1984	24	4
1986	26	40
1988	28	10
1989	29	15
1990	30	17
1991	31	9
1992	32	6
1993	33	12
1994	34	7
1995	35	6

==== Individual podiums ====
- 4 victories
- 11 podiums

No.	Season	Date	Location	Race	Level	Place
1	1981–82	6 March 1982	Lahti, Finland	10 km Individual	World Cup	3rd
2	1981–82	13 April 1982	Kiruna, Sweden	5 km Individual	World Cup	3rd
3	1983–84	17 March 1984	Štrbské Pleso, Czechoslovakia	5 km Individual	World Cup	3rd
4	1983–84	24 March 1984	Murmansk, Soviet Union	10 km Individual	World Cup	1st
5	1987–88	9 January 1988	Leningrad, Soviet Union	10 km Individual C	World Cup	1st
6	1990–91	5 January 1991	Minsk, Soviet Union	30 km Individual C	World Cup	3rd
7	1990–91	12 January 1991	Klingenthal, Germany	15 km Individual C	World Cup	1st
8	1991–92	1 March 1992	Lahti, Finland	30 km Individual C	World Cup	2nd
9	1993–94	19 March 1994	Thunder Bay, Canada	5 km Individual C	World Cup	2nd
10	1994–95	28 January 1995	Lahti, Finland	10 km Individual C	World Cup	1st
11	1994–95	10 March 1995	Thunder Bay, Canada	15 km Individual C	World Championships^{[1]}	3rd

==== Team podiums ====
- 10 victories
- 23 podiums

No.	Season	Date	Location	Race	Level	Place	Teammates
1	1981–82	24 February 1982	Oslo, Norway	4 × 5 km Relay	World Championships^{[1]}	1st	Bøe / Aunli / Pettersen
2	1983–84	15 February 1984	(Socialist Federal Republic of Yugoslavia) Sarajevo, Yugoslavia	4 × 5 km Relay	Olympic Games^{[1]}	1st	Jahren / Pettersen / Aunli
3	1983–84	26 February 1984	Falun, Sweden	4 × 5 km Relay	World Cup	1st	Bøe / Jahren / Pettersen
4	1985–86	13 March 1986	Oslo, Norway	4 × 5 km Relay F	World Cup	3rd	Nykkelmo / H. Pedersen / Tangen
5	1986–87	19 March 1987	Oslo, Norway	4 × 5 km Relay C	World Cup	1st	Dybendahl-Hartz / Pettersen / Nykkelmo
6	1987–88	13 March 1988	Falun, Sweden	4 × 5 km Relay C	World Cup	1st	Dybendahl-Hartz / Jahren / Dahlmo
7	1988–89	23 February 1989	Lahti, Finland	4 × 5 km Relay C/F	World Championships^{[1]}	3rd	Jahren / Skeime / Dahlmo
8	1988–89	12 March 1989	Falun, Sweden	4 × 5 km Relay C	World Cup	1st	Dahlmo / Jahren / Dybendahl-Hartz
9	1989–90	4 March 1990	Lahti, Finland	4 × 5 km Relay F	World Cup	1st	S. Pedersen / Jahren / Dybendahl-Hartz
10	1989–90	11 March 1990	Örnsköldsvik, Sweden	4 × 5 km Relay C/F	World Cup	2nd	S. Pedersen / Hegge / Nilsen
11	1990–91	15 February 1991	Val di Fiemme, Italy	4 × 5 km Relay C/F	World Championships^{[1]}	3rd	S. Pedersen / Nilsen / Dybendahl-Hartz
12	1990–91	10 March 1991	Falun, Sweden	4 × 5 km Relay C	World Cup	2nd	S. Pedersen / Nilsen / Dybendahl-Hartz
13	1990–91	15 March 1991	Oslo, Norway	4 × 5 km Relay C/F	World Cup	1st	Dybendahl-Hartz / S. Pedersen / Nilsen
14	1991–92	18 February 1992	Albertville, France	4 × 5 km Relay C/F	Olympic Games^{[1]}	2nd	S. Pedersen / Dybendahl-Hartz / Nilsen
15	1991–92	8 March 1992	Funäsdalen, Sweden	4 × 5 km Relay C	World Cup	1st	S. Pedersen / Nilsen / Dybendahl-Hartz
16	1992–93	26 February 1993	Falun, Sweden	4 × 5 km Relay C/F	World Championships^{[1]}	3rd	Dybendahl-Hartz / Moen / Nilsen
17	1993–94	22 February 1994	Lillehammer, Norway	4 × 5 km Relay C/F	Olympic Games^{[1]}	2nd	Dybendahl-Hartz / Nilsen / Moen
18	1993–94	4 March 1994	Lahti, Finland	4 × 5 km Relay C	World Cup	1st	Moen / Wold / Dybendahl-Hartz
19	1993–94	13 March 1994	Falun, Sweden	4 × 5 km Relay F	World Cup	2nd	Moen / Wold / Dybendahl-Hartz
20	1994–95	15 January 1995	Nové Město, Czech Republic	4 × 5 km Relay C	World Cup	2nd	Mikkelsplass / Uglem / Sorkmo
21	1994–95	12 February 1995	Oslo, Norway	4 × 5 km Relay C/F	World Cup	2nd	Mikkelsplass / Nilsen / Moen
22	1994–95	17 March 1995	Thunder Bay, Canada	4 × 5 km Relay C/F	World Championships^{[1]}	2nd	Mikkelsplass / Nilsen / Moen
23	1994–95	26 March 1995	Sapporo, Japan	4 × 5 km Relay C/F	World Cup	2nd	Dybendahl-Hartz / Mikkelsplass / Nilsen

Note: ^{1} Until the 1999 World Championships and the 1994 Olympics, World Championship and Olympic races were included in the World Cup scoring system.
