= Marianne Dahlmo =

Norwegian cross-country skier

Personal information
- Nationality: Norway
- Born: 5 January 1965 (age 61) Bodø, Norway

Sport
- Sport: Skiing
- Club: Bodø & Omegn IF

World Cup career
- Seasons: 9 – (1985–1991, 1993–1994)
- Indiv. starts: 52
- Indiv. podiums: 12
- Indiv. wins: 4
- Team starts: 9
- Team podiums: 9
- Team wins: 3
- Overall titles: 0 – (2nd in 1986)
Medal record
Women's cross-country skiing
Representing Norway
Olympic Games
| Silver medal – second place | 1988 Calgary | 4 × 5 km relay |
World Championships
| Silver medal – second place | 1987 Oberstdorf | 4 × 5 km relay |
| Bronze medal – third place | 1989 Lahti | 4 × 5 km relay |
Junior World Championships
| Silver medal – second place | 1985 Täsch | 5 km |

Marianne Dahlmo (born 5 January 1965) is a former Norwegian cross-country skier who competed from 1985 to 1994. She won a silver medal in the 4 × 5 km relay at the 1988 Winter Olympics in Calgary and also finished 8th in the 20 km event in those same games.

Dahlmo also won two medals in the 4 × 5 km relay FIS Nordic World Ski Championships (silver: 1987, bronze: 1989). She also finished fifth in the 10 km in 1987 and fifth again in the 5 km in 1991. She also won four World Cup Events during the late 1980s as well.

She represented the club Bodø & Omegn IF.

== Cross-country skiing results ==
All results are sourced from the International Ski Federation (FIS).

=== Olympic Games ===
- 1 medal – (1 silver)

| Year | Age | 5 km | 10 km | 20 km | 4 × 5 km relay |
|---|---|---|---|---|---|
| 1988 | 23 | 9 | — | 8 | Silver |

=== World Championships ===
- 2 medals – (1 silver, 1 bronze)

| Year | Age | 5 km | 10 km classical | 10 km freestyle | 15 km | Pursuit | 20 km | 30 km | 4 × 5 km relay |
|---|---|---|---|---|---|---|---|---|---|
| 1987 | 22 | 10 | 5 | —N/a | —N/a | —N/a | 18 | —N/a | Silver |
| 1989 | 24 | —N/a | 14 | 6 | — | —N/a | —N/a | 6 | Bronze |
| 1991 | 26 | 5 | —N/a | — | — | —N/a | —N/a | — | — |
| 1993 | 28 | 19 | —N/a | —N/a | 21 | 32 | —N/a | — | — |

=== World Cup ===
==== Season standings ====
| Season | Age | Overall |
|---|---|---|
| 1985 | 20 | 19 |
| 1986 | 21 | 2nd place, silver medalist(s) |
| 1987 | 22 | 3rd place, bronze medalist(s) |
| 1988 | 23 | 7 |
| 1989 | 24 | 7 |
| 1990 | 25 | 29 |
| 1991 | 26 | 29 |
| 1993 | 28 | 25 |
| 1994 | 29 | 57 |

==== Individual podiums ====
- 4 victories
- 12 podiums

| No. | Season | Date | Location | Race | Level | Place |
|---|---|---|---|---|---|---|
| 1 | 1984–85 | 2 March 1985 | Lahti, Finland | 5 km Individual | World Cup | 3rd |
| 2 | 1985–86 | 13 December 1985 | Biwabik, United States | 10 km Individual C | World Cup | 2nd |
| 3 | 1985–86 | 18 January 1986 | Nové Město, Czechoslovakia | 20 km Individual F | World Cup | 3rd |
| 4 | 1985–86 | 15 February 1986 | Oberstdorf, West Germany | 20 km Individual C | World Cup | 1st |
| 5 | 1985–86 | 22 February 1986 | Kavgolovo, Soviet Union | 10 km Individual C | World Cup | 2nd |
| 6 | 1985–86 | 2 March 1986 | Lahti, Finland | 5 km Individual C | World Cup | 3rd |
| 7 | 1986–87 | 10 December 1986 | Ramsau, Austria | 10 km Individual F | World Cup | 1st |
| 8 | 1986–87 | 20 December 1986 | Cogne, Italy | 20 km Individual F | World Cup | 2nd |
| 9 | 1986–87 | 7 March 1987 | Falun, Sweden | 30 km Individual F | World Cup | 3rd |
| 10 | 1987–88 | 13 December 1987 | La Clusaz, France | 5 km Individual F | World Cup | 1st |
| 11 | 1988–89 | 13 January 1989 | Klingenthal, East Germany | 10 km Individual C | World Cup | 1st |
| 12 | 1988–89 | 15 January 1989 | Klingenthal, East Germany | 30 km Individual F | World Cup | 3rd |

==== Team podiums ====
- 3 victories
- 9 podiums

| No. | Season | Date | Location | Race | Level | Place | Teammates |
|---|---|---|---|---|---|---|---|
| 1 | 1984–85 | 10 March 1985 | Falun, Sweden | 4 × 5 km Relay | World Cup | 1st | Nykkelmo / Dybendahl-Hartz / Bøe |
| 2 | 1985–86 | 13 March 1986 | Oslo, Norway | 4 × 5 km Relay F | World Cup | 2nd | Skeime / Aunli / Jahren |
| 3 | 1986–87 | 17 February 1987 | Oberstdorf, West Germany | 4 × 5 km Relay F | World Championships^{[1]} | 2nd | Skeime / Jahren / Bøe |
| 4 | 1986–87 | 1 March 1987 | Lahti, Finland | 4 × 5 km Relay C/F | World Cup | 2nd | Pettersen / Jahren / Skeime |
| 5 | 1986–87 | 19 March 1987 | Oslo, Norway | 4 × 5 km Relay C | World Cup | 3rd | Bøe / Skeime / Jahren |
| 6 | 1987–88 | 21 February 1988 | Calgary, Canada | 4 × 5 km Relay F | Olympic Games^{[1]} | 2nd | Dybendahl-Hartz / Wold / Jahren |
| 7 | 1987–88 | 13 March 1988 | Falun, Sweden | 4 × 5 km Relay C | World Cup | 1st | Dybendahl-Hartz / Nybråten / Jahren |
| 8 | 1988–89 | 23 February 1989 | Lahti, Finland | 4 × 5 km Relay C/F | World Championships^{[1]} | 3rd | Nybråten / Jahren / Skeime |
| 9 | 1988–89 | 12 March 1989 | Falun, Sweden | 4 × 5 km Relay C | World Cup | 1st | Jahren / Nybråten / Dybendahl-Hartz |

Note: ^{1} Until the 1999 World Championships and the 1994 Olympics, World Championship and Olympic races were included in the World Cup scoring system.
