= Stachy =

- Municipality
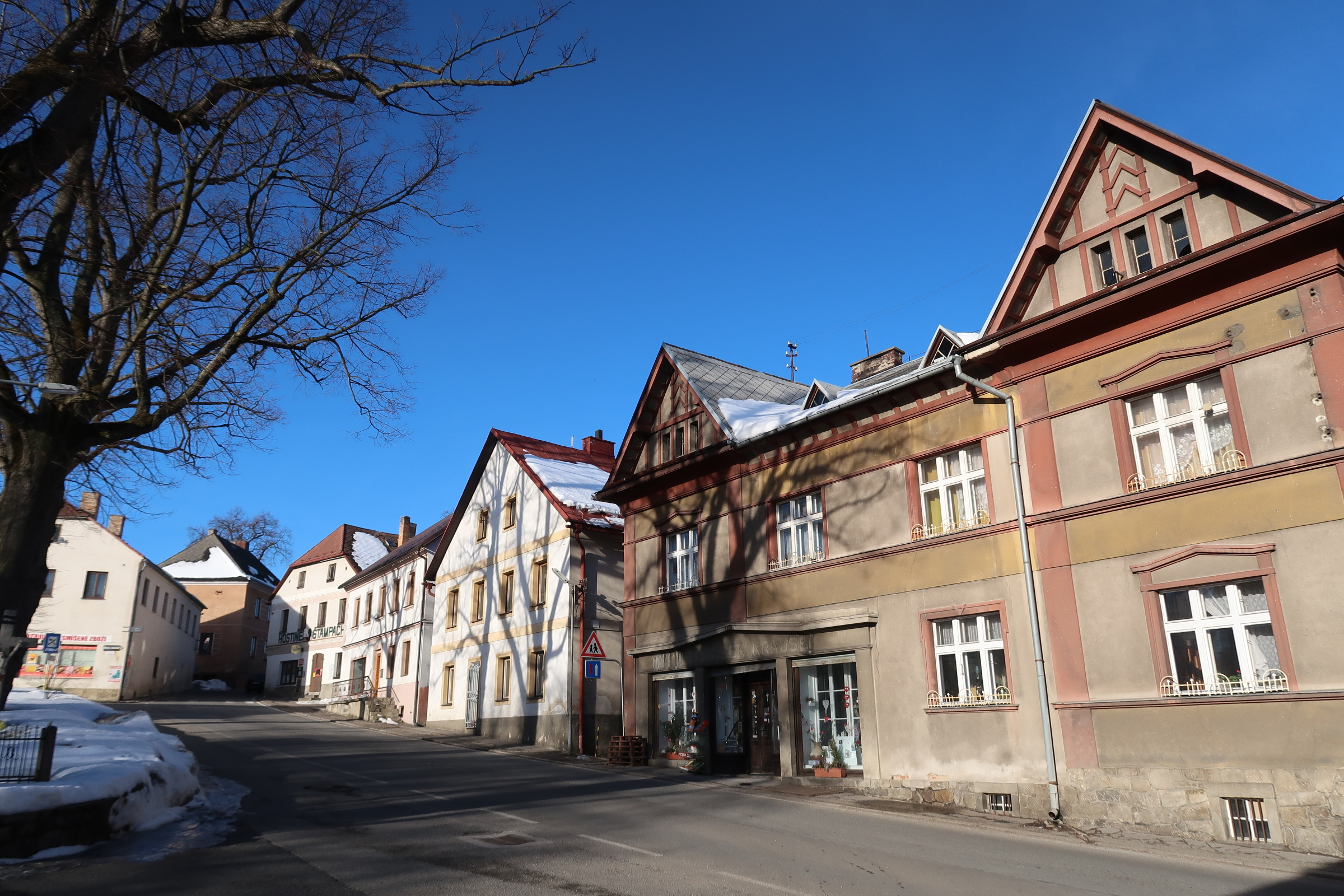
- Centre of Stachy

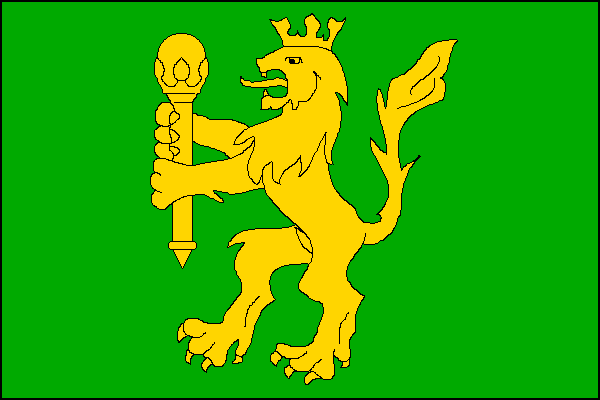
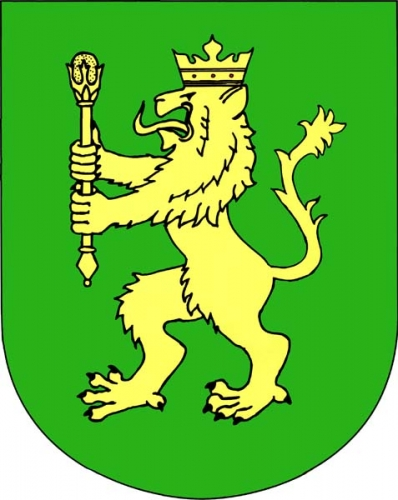
- Flag Coat of arms

- Location in the Czech Republic
- Coordinates: 49°6′7″N 13°40′0″E
- Country: Czech Republic
- Region: South Bohemian
- District: Prachatice
- First mentioned: 1578

Area
  - Total: 28.17 km^{2} (10.88 sq mi)
- Elevation: 738 m (2,421 ft)

Population (2026-01-01)
  - Total: 1,089
  - Density: 38.66/km^{2} (100.1/sq mi)
- Time zone: UTC+1 (CET)
  - Summer (DST): UTC+2 (CEST)
- Postal code: 384 73
- Website: www.stachy.net

Stachy (German: Stachau) is a municipality and village in Prachatice District in the South Bohemian Region of the Czech Republic. It has about 1,100 inhabitants. The historic part of the village is protected as a village monument reservation. The hamlet of Chalupy within the municipality is protected as a village monument zone.

== Administrative division ==
Stachy consists of three municipal parts (in brackets population according to the 2021 census):

- Stachy (973)
- Jaroškov (71)
- Úbislav (127)

== Etymology ==
The initial name of Stachy was Stachov. The name was derived from the personal name Stach, meaning "Stach's (court)". In the middle of the 19th century, the name was changed to Stachy.

== Geography ==
Stachy is located about 26 kilometres (16 mi) west of Prachatice and 60 km (37 mi) west of České Budějovice. The municipality lies mostly in the Bohemian Forest, only the area of the village of Stachy lies in the Bohemian Forest Foothills. The highest point is the mountain Churáňovský vrch at 1,120 m (3,670 ft) above sea level. The Spůlka Stream flows along the eastern municipal border.

Most of the territory lies within the Šumava Protected Landscape Area and its westernmost part lies within the Šumava National Park. In the park in the centre of Stachy there is a protected area with a rich occurrence of Boletus mushrooms.

=== Climate ===
There is a weather station at the summit of Churáňovský vrch called Churáňov. It belongs among the most famous weather stations in the country. It was established in 1952. The lowest temperature of −32.6 °C (−26.7 °F) was measured here in 1956 and the highest temperature of 34.2 °C (93.6 °F) in 1983.

Climate data for Churáňovský vrch, 1991–2020 normals, extremes 1952–present
Month	Jan	Feb	Mar	Apr	May	Jun	Jul	Aug	Sep	Oct	Nov	Dec	Year
Record high °C (°F)	16.9 (62.4)	17.5 (63.5)	19.9 (67.8)	25.6 (78.1)	27.5 (81.5)	30.1 (86.2)	34.2 (93.6)	30.8 (87.4)	30.4 (86.7)	23.9 (75.0)	21.6 (70.9)	15.2 (59.4)	34.2 (93.6)
Mean daily maximum °C (°F)	0.2 (32.4)	1.0 (33.8)	4.1 (39.4)	9.5 (49.1)	14.0 (57.2)	17.5 (63.5)	19.4 (66.9)	19.4 (66.9)	14.4 (57.9)	9.9 (49.8)	4.9 (40.8)	1.1 (34.0)	9.6 (49.3)
Daily mean °C (°F)	−3.1 (26.4)	−2.8 (27.0)	0.1 (32.2)	4.7 (40.5)	9.1 (48.4)	12.6 (54.7)	14.3 (57.7)	14.2 (57.6)	9.7 (49.5)	5.6 (42.1)	1.3 (34.3)	−2.0 (28.4)	5.3 (41.5)
Mean daily minimum °C (°F)	−5.7 (21.7)	−5.7 (21.7)	−3.1 (26.4)	0.6 (33.1)	4.8 (40.6)	8.1 (46.6)	10.0 (50.0)	10.0 (50.0)	6.3 (43.3)	2.6 (36.7)	−1.4 (29.5)	−4.5 (23.9)	1.8 (35.2)
Record low °C (°F)	−24.2 (−11.6)	−23.7 (−10.7)	−21.3 (−6.3)	−13.4 (7.9)	−7.3 (18.9)	−2.5 (27.5)	−1.5 (29.3)	−1.0 (30.2)	−1.9 (28.6)	−10.5 (13.1)	−15.6 (3.9)	−22.2 (−8.0)	−32.6 (−26.7)
Average precipitation mm (inches)	87.7 (3.45)	75.0 (2.95)	91.3 (3.59)	64.9 (2.56)	100.7 (3.96)	116.5 (4.59)	127.3 (5.01)	110.2 (4.34)	79.5 (3.13)	79.8 (3.14)	69.8 (2.75)	89.6 (3.53)	1,092.4 (43.01)
Average snowfall cm (inches)	68.8 (27.1)	61.5 (24.2)	55.0 (21.7)	21.7 (8.5)	1.3 (0.5)	0.0 (0.0)	0.0 (0.0)	0.0 (0.0)	1.0 (0.4)	9.4 (3.7)	35.1 (13.8)	58.8 (23.1)	312.7 (123.1)
Average precipitation days (≥ 1.0 mm)	13.7	11.5	14.3	10.3	12.8	12.8	13.8	10.9	10.8	10.6	10.9	13.9	146.3
Average relative humidity (%)	86.1	83.2	82.9	75.4	76.1	76.7	76.1	76.6	84.0	85.1	86.3	86.7	81.3
Mean monthly sunshine hours	69.4	90.7	126.7	168.9	186.1	193.4	213.3	211.7	152.4	125.9	79.8	64.2	1,682.4
Source 1: NOAA
Source 2: Czech Hydrometeorological Institute

== History ==
The first written mention of Stachy is from 1587. Initially named Stachov, it was probably founded at the beginning of the 16th century as a hamlet around a glass smelter. From the beginning of settlement in the area, the ethnically Czech population predominated. In addition to glassmaking, the village was known for the production of clogs and wood shingles. In the 19th century, the village expanded to the west, creating the present-day centre of the village.

== Demographics ==
Historical population

Year	Pop.	±%
1869	2,872	—
1880	3,043	+6.0%
1890	3,356	+10.3%
1900	3,397	+1.2%
1910	3,590	+5.7%

Year	Pop.	±%
1921	3,210	−10.6%
1930	2,771	−13.7%
1950	1,746	−37.0%
1961	1,573	−9.9%
1970	1,462	−7.1%

Year	Pop.	±%
1980	1,355	−7.3%
1991	1,236	−8.8%
2001	1,216	−1.6%
2011	1,251	+2.9%
2021	1,171	−6.4%

Source: Censuses

== Transport ==
There are no railways or major roads passing through the municipality.

== Sights ==
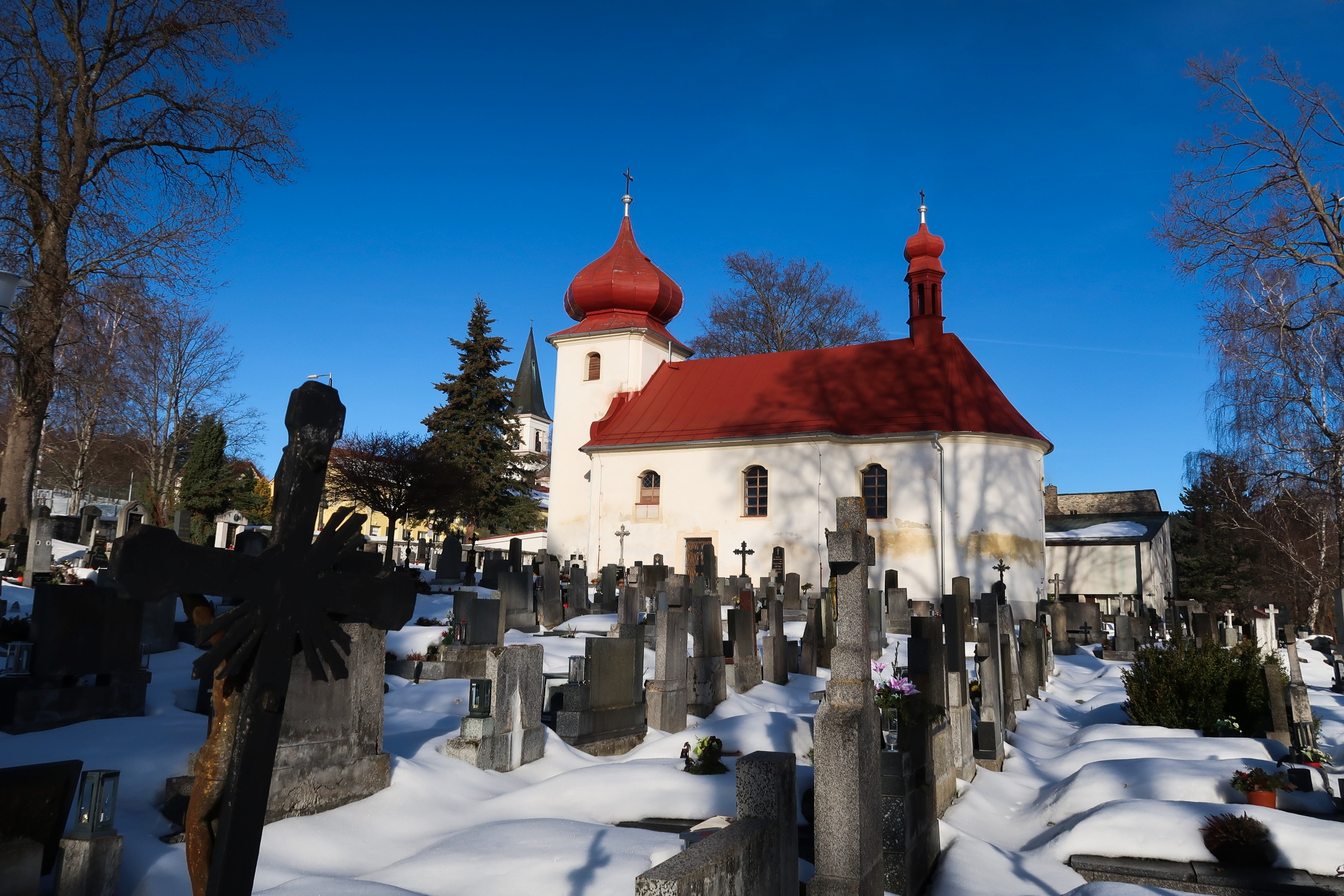
Church of Our Lady of the Sorrows

The historic part of the village of Stachy around the road to Vimperk is formed by well preserved folk-architecture timbered houses and is protected as a village monument reservation. The main landmarks of the village are the Church of Our Lady of the Sorrows from 1781 and the Church the Visitation of the Virgin Mary, which was built in the Empire style in 1842–1849.

A notable building is also the Chapel of Our Lady of the Sorrows. It was built in the Baroque style in the mid-18th century. It has an unusual mansard roof covered with wood shingles.

A locality called Chalupy is also well preserved and is protected as a village monument zone. It is a small hamlet, formed by concentrated mountain solitudes, mostly from the late 18th and early 19th centuries. The houses are a typical example of wooden Bohemian Forest folk architecture.
