= Holmenkollen National Arena =

Ski and biathlon venue in Oslo, Norway

Coordinates: 59°57′38″N 10°39′45″E

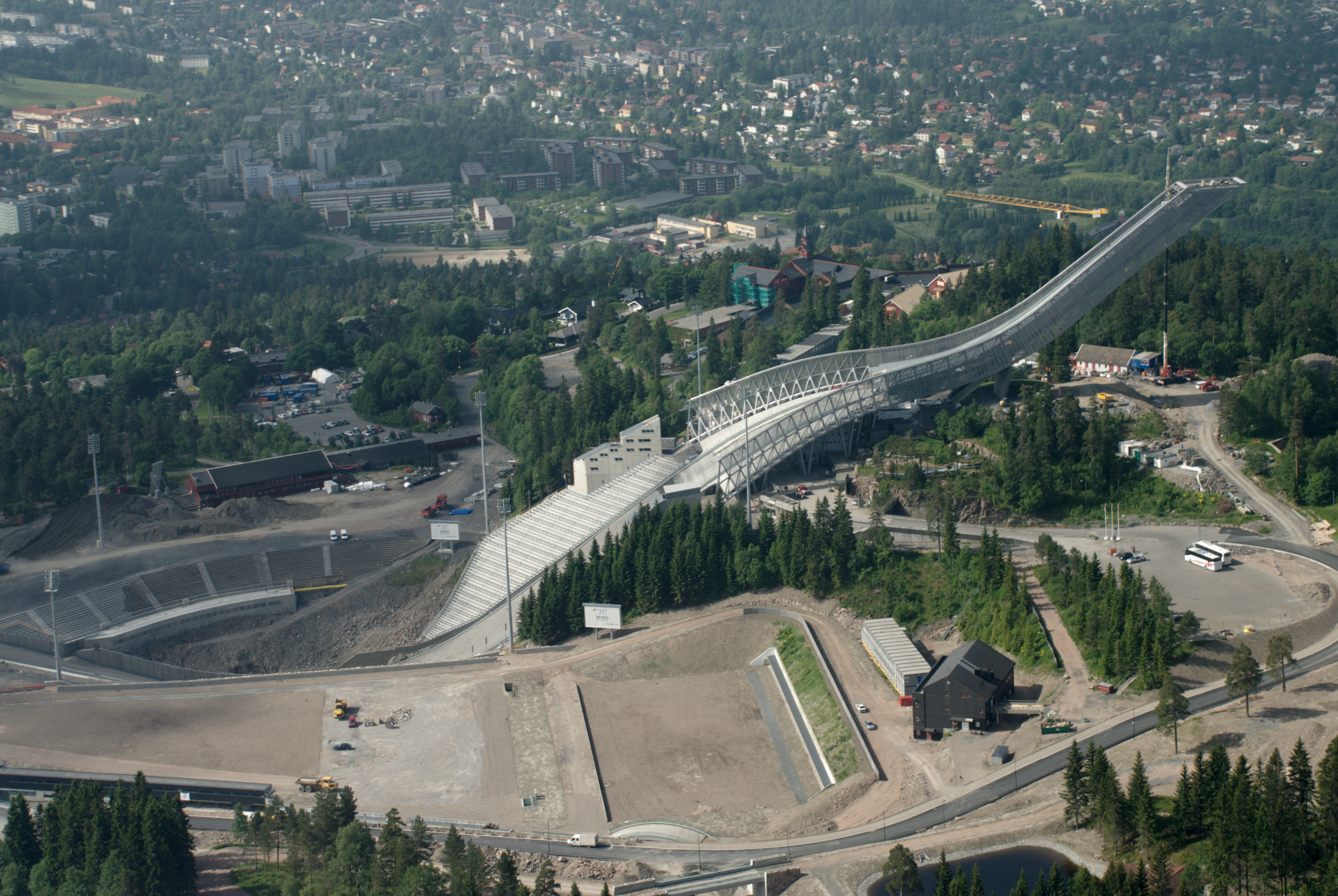
Holmenkollbakken in the background with the stadium in the foreground during construction

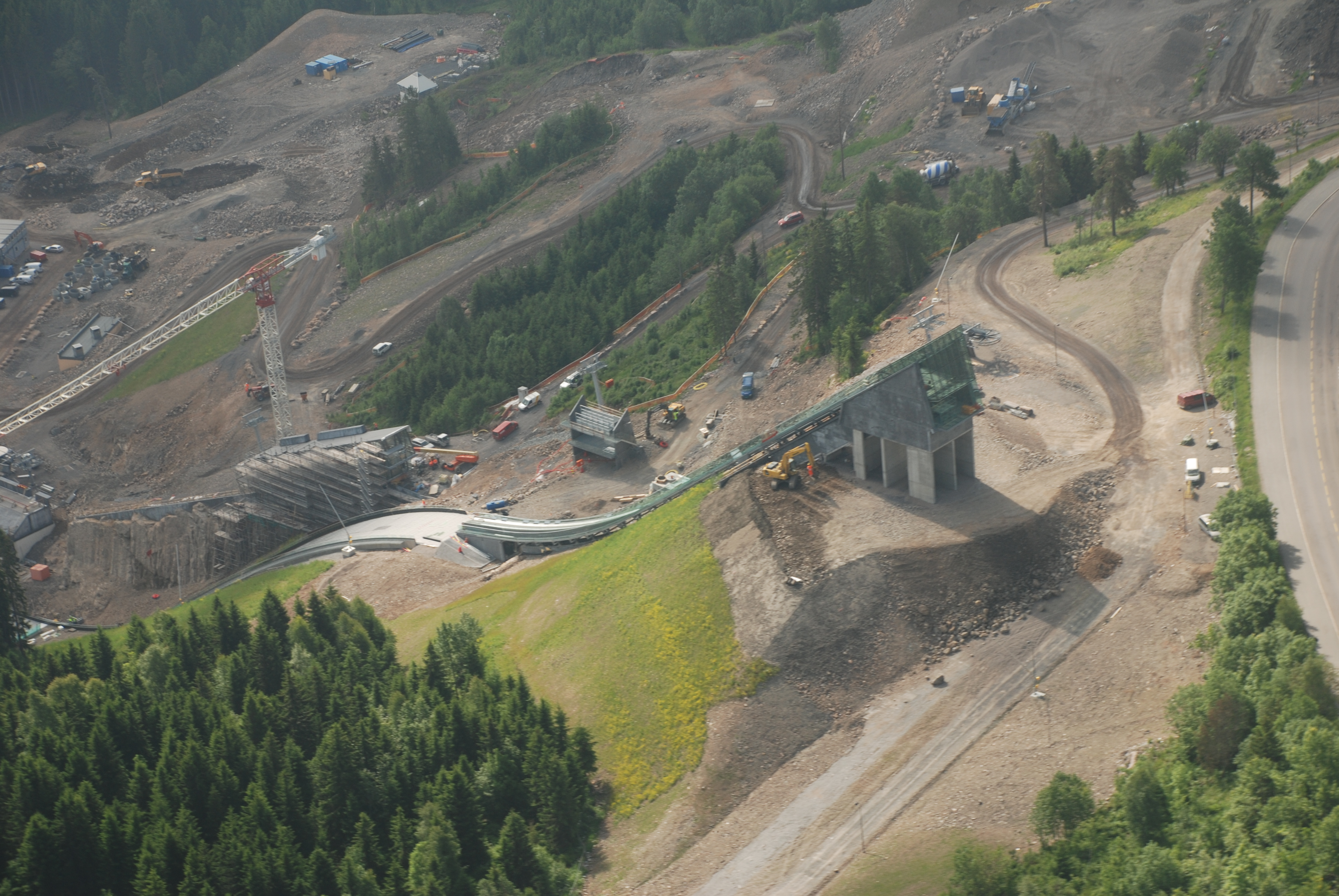
Midstubakken during construction

Holmenkollen National Arena (Norwegian: Holmenkollen nasjonalanlegg) is a Nordic skiing, ski jumping and biathlon venue located at Holmenkollen in Oslo, Norway. It consists of the large ski jumping hill Holmenkollbakken, the normal hill Midtstubakken and a stadium for cross-country skiing and a shooting range for biathlon. Since 1892, it has hosted the annual Holmenkollen Ski Festival, which is part of the world cup tournaments in ski jumping, cross-country skiing, Nordic combined, as well as annual Biathlon World Cup races. It has previously hosted the 1952 Winter Olympics, and the FIS Nordic World Ski Championships in 1930, 1966, 1982 and 2011.

== Facilities ==
=== Holmenkollbakken ===
Holmenkollbakken is a large ski jumping hill with a hill size of 134 and a construction point (K-spot) of 120. It has a spectator capacity for 70,000. The current structure dates from 2010 and consists of a 64 meters (210 ft) tall superstructure. The top of the structure is 420 meters (1,380 ft) above mean sea level. It is the first hill in the world with a permanent wind screen; it is able to restrain 45 to 50 percent of the wind.

=== Midtstubakken ===
Midtstubakken is a normal hill with a hill size of 106 and a K-point of 95. It has a capacity for 16,000 spectators and was completed in 2010.

=== Stadium ===
Next to Holmenkollbakken is a combined cross-country skiing and biathlon stadium. There are about 10 kilometers (6 mi) of tracks, which generally are 9 meters (30 ft) wide. Intersection are grade-separated, which allows for the flow of spectators without interfering with the athletes.

=== Other facilities ===
The area includes Holmenkollen Chapel, Holmenkollen Park Hotel Rica and the Holmenkollen Ski Museum. There are five smaller ski jumping hills, ranging from K-5 to K-58.

== Transport ==
Public rail transport is provided to ensure no spectators will use private cars to reach the venue. Instead, all spectators must use the Holmenkollen Line of the Oslo Metro. Holmenkollen Station is located within walking distance of the large hill and cross-country stadium, while Midtstuen Station is closest to Midtstubakken. Holmenkollen Station is the only one on the line with platforms long enough for six cars, which allows a capacity of 9,000 per hour.
