= Kent Ove Clausen =

Norwegian cross-country skier

Personal information
- Nationality: Norway
- Born: November 7, 1985 (age 40)

Sport
- Sport: Skiing
- Club: Tydal IL

World Cup career
- Seasons: 6 – (2008–2013)
- Indiv. starts: 21
- Indiv. podiums: 0
- Team starts: 0
- Overall titles: 0 – (79th in 2013)
- Discipline titles: 0

Kent Ove Clausen (born 7 November 1985) is a Norwegian cross-country skier.

He made his World Cup debut in March 2008 in Drammen, and collected his first World Cup points with a 22nd place in Trondheim in March 2009. He has only competed in sprint events.

He represents the sports club Steinkjer SK, and lives in Verdal Municipality.

== Cross-country skiing results ==
All results are sourced from the International Ski Federation (FIS).

=== World Cup ===
==== Season standings ====
| Season | Age | Discipline standings | | | Ski Tour standings | | |
| Season | Age | Overall | Distance | Sprint | Nordic Opening | Tour de Ski | World Cup Final |
|---|---|---|---|---|---|---|---|
| 2008 | 22 | NC | — | NC | —N/a | — | — |
| 2009 | 23 | 154 | — | 90 | —N/a | — | — |
| 2010 | 24 | 86 | — | 41 | —N/a | — | — |
| 2011 | 25 | 102 | — | 56 | — | — | — |
| 2012 | 26 | 105 | — | 53 | — | — | — |
| 2013 | 27 | 79 | — | 51 | — | — | — |
