= Marit Roaldseth =

Norwegian cross-country skier

Personal information
- Nationality: Norway
- Born: 21 July 1977 (age 48) Molde, Norway

Sport
- Sport: Skiing
- Club: Molde og Omegn IF

World Cup career
- Seasons: 7 – (1998–2004)
- Indiv. starts: 62
- Indiv. podiums: 0
- Team starts: 10
- Team podiums: 1
- Team wins: 0
- Discipline titles: 0
Medal record
Women's cross-country skiing
Representing Norway
Junior World Championships
| Bronze medal – third place | 1997 Canmore | 4 × 5 km relay |

Marit Roaldseth (born 27 July 1977) is a retired Norwegian cross-country skier.

She performed well at the Junior World Championships, with a fourth place in 1996 and an eighth place in 1997, both in the 5 km.

She made her World Cup debut in November 1997 in Beitostølen, placing lowly. She broke the top 30-barrier with a 24th place in November 1999 in Kiruna, Sweden. Capitalizing on the introduction of sprint events, she placed fourth in Engelberg and sixth in Kitzbühel, both in December 1999. She never made the podium. Her last World Cup start came in March 2004 in Lahti.

Competing at two World Championships, in 2001 she finished 18th in the 10 kilometres and 15th in the 15 km, and in 2001 she finished 28th in the 10 km and 31st in the 15 km.

She represented the sports club Molde og Omegn IF. She married fellow skier Håvard Bjerkeli.

== Cross-country skiing results ==
All results are sourced from the International Ski Federation (FIS).

=== World Championships ===
| Year | Age | 10 km | 15 km | Pursuit | 30 km | Sprint | 4 × 5 km relay |
|---|---|---|---|---|---|---|---|
| 2001 | 23 | 18 | 15 | — | CNX^{[a]} | — | — |
| 2003 | 25 | 28 | 31 | — | — | — | — |

a. ^{1} Cancelled due to extremely cold weather.

=== World Cup ===
==== Season standings ====
| Season | Age | | | | | |
| Season | Age | Overall | Distance | Long Distance | Middle Distance | Sprint |
|---|---|---|---|---|---|---|
| 1998 | 20 | NC | —N/a | NC | —N/a | — |
| 1999 | 21 | NC | —N/a | NC | —N/a | — |
| 2000 | 22 | 28 | —N/a | 59 | 33 | 10 |
| 2001 | 23 | 36 | —N/a | —N/a | —N/a | 21 |
| 2002 | 24 | 51 | —N/a | —N/a | —N/a | 35 |
| 2003 | 25 | 33 | —N/a | —N/a | —N/a | 31 |
| 2004 | 26 | 48 | 68 | —N/a | —N/a | 26 |

=== Team podiums ===
- 1 podium

| No. | Season | Date | Location | Race | Level | Place | Teammate(s) |
|---|---|---|---|---|---|---|---|
| 1 | 1999–00 | 19 December 1999 | Davos, Switzerland | 4 × 5 km Relay C | World Cup | 3rd | Bay / Sorkmo / Schei |
