= Arnstein Finstad =

Norwegian cross-country skier

Personal information
- Nationality: Norway
- Born: March 21, 1978 (age 48)

Sport
- Sport: Skiing
- Club: Steinkjer SK

World Cup career
- Seasons: 5 – (2002–2006)
- Indiv. starts: 7
- Indiv. podiums: 0
- Team starts: 0
- Overall titles: 0 – (116th in 2004)
- Discipline titles: 0

Arnstein Finstad (born 21 March 1978) is a Norwegian cross-country skier.

He made his World Cup debut in March 2002 in Oslo, and collected his first World Cup points with a 27th place in Stockholm in February 2004. One week later he finished 19th in Drammen. He has only competed in sprint events.

He represents the sports club Steinkjer SK, and lives in Steinkjer.

== Cross-country skiing results ==
All results are sourced from the International Ski Federation (FIS).

=== World Cup ===
==== Season standings ====
Season	Age			
Season	Age	Overall	Distance	Sprint
2002	24	NC	—N/a	NC
2003	25	NC	—N/a	NC
2004	26	116	—	59
2005	27	NC	—	NC
2006	28	NC	—	NC
