= 1999–2000 FIS Cross-Country World Cup =

Cross-country skiing competition

Discipline	Men	Women
Overall	(Spain) Johan Mühlegg	(Norway) Bente Martinsen (2nd title)
Long Distance	(Spain) Johan Mühlegg	(Russia) Larisa Lazutina
Middle Distance	(Finland) Jari Isometsä	(Estonia) Kristina Šmigun
Sprint	(Norway) Morten Brørs	(Norway) Bente Martinsen
Nations Cup	Norway	Russia
- Nations Cup Overall: Norway

Competition
Locations	17 venues	17 venues
Individual	21 events	21 events
Relay/Team	5 events	5 events

The 1999–2000 FIS Cross-Country World Cup was the 19th official World Cup season in cross-country skiing for men and women. The season began on 27 November 1999 in Kiruna, Sweden and finished on 19 March 2000 in Bormio, Italy. Johann Mühlegg of Spain won the men's cup, and Bente Skari of Norway won the women's.

The 1999–2000 World Cup season is the only season where a Middle Distance Cup has been arranged.

== Calendar ==
=== Men ===
Key: C – Classic / F – Freestyle
WC	Date	Place	Discipline	Winner	Second	Third	Ref.
1	27 November 1999	(Sweden) Kiruna	10 km C	(Norway) Odd-Bjørn Hjelmeset	(Norway) Thomas Alsgaard	(Slovakia) Ivan Bátory	
2	10 December 1999	(Italy) Sappada	15 km F	(Spain) Johann Mühlegg	(Liechtenstein) Stephan Kunz	(Austria) Christian Hoffmann	
3	11 December 1999	(Italy) Sappada	7.5 km C + 7.5 km F Double Pursuit	(Norway) Thomas Alsgaard	(Norway) Espen Bjervig	(Liechtenstein) Stephan Kunz	
4	18 December 1999	(Switzerland) Davos	30 km C	(Norway) Frode Estil	(Norway) Espen Bjervig	(Sweden) Niklas Jonsson	
5	27 December 1999	(Switzerland) Engelberg	Sprint C	(Italy) Fabio Maj	(Norway) Espen Bjervig	(Norway) Odd-Bjørn Hjelmeset	
6	28 December 1999	(Germany) Garmisch-Partenkirchen	Sprint C	(Germany) Peter Schlickenrieder	(Norway) Håvard Solbakken	(Czech Republic) Martin Koukal	
7	29 December 1999	(Austria) Kitzbühel	Sprint F	(Norway) Morten Brørs	(Norway) Håvard Solbakken	(Norway) Håvard Bjerkeli	
8	9 January 2000	(Russia) Moscow	30 km F	(Spain) Johann Mühlegg	(Norway) Thomas Alsgaard	(Liechtenstein) Stephan Kunz	
9	12 January 2000	(Czech Republic) Nové Město	15 km C	(Norway) Thomas Alsgaard	(Spain) Johann Mühlegg	(Finland) Harri Kirvesniemi	
10	2 February 2000	(Norway) Trondheim	10 km F	(Finland) Mika Myllylä	(Sweden) Per Elofsson	(Italy) Pietro Piller Cottrer	
11	5 February 2000	(Norway) Lillehammer	10 km C + 10 km F Combined Pursuit	(Finland) Jari Isometsä	(Spain) Johann Mühlegg	(Austria) Mikhail Botvinov	
12	16 February 2000	(Switzerland) Ulrichen	10 km F	(Finland) Jari Isometsä	(Sweden) Per Elofsson	(Germany) René Sommerfeldt	
13	20 February 2000	(France) Lamoura-Mouthe	72 km F Mass Start	(Spain) Johann Mühlegg	(Sweden) Per Elofsson	(Spain) Juan Jesús Gutiérrez	
14	26 February 2000	(Sweden) Falun	15 km F	(Spain) Johann Mühlegg	(Finland) Jari Isometsä	(Italy) Pietro Piller Cottrer	
15	28 February 2000	(Sweden) Stockholm	Sprint C	(Norway) Odd-Bjørn Hjelmeset	(Norway) Tore Bjonviken	(Norway) Håvard Solbakken	
16	3 March 2000	(Finland) Lahti	Sprint F	(Italy) Cristian Zorzi	(Norway) Morten Brørs	(Italy) Silvio Fauner	
17	5 March 2000	(Finland) Lahti	30 km C Mass Start	(Russia) Mikhail Ivanov	(Italy) Fabio Maj	(Russia) Vladimir Vilisov	
18	8 March 2000	(Norway) Oslo	Sprint C	(Norway) Odd-Bjørn Hjelmeset	(Norway) Jens Arne Svartedal	(Norway) Trond Iversen	
19	11 March 2000	(Norway) Oslo	50 km C	(Finland) Harri Kirvesniemi	(Russia) Mikhail Ivanov	(Austria) Mikhail Botvinov	
20	17 March 2000	(Italy) Bormio	10 km C	(Norway) Erling Jevne	(Norway) Odd-Bjørn Hjelmeset	(Norway) Frode Estil	
21	19 March 2000	(Italy) Bormio	15 km F Pursuit	(Finland) Jari Isometsä	(Spain) Johann Mühlegg	(Sweden) Per Elofsson	

=== Women ===
Key: C – Classic / F – Freestyle
WC	Date	Place	Discipline	Winner	Second	Third	Ref.
1	27 November 1999	(Sweden) Kiruna	5 km C	(Norway) Bente Martinsen	(Norway) Anita Moen	(Estonia) Kristina Šmigun	
2	10 December 1999	(Italy) Sappada	10 km F	(Estonia) Kristina Šmigun	(Russia) Larisa Lazutina	(Russia) Yuliya Chepalova	
3	12 December 1999	(Italy) Sappada	7.5 km F	(Russia) Larisa Lazutina	(Russia) Nina Gavrylyuk	(Russia) Olga Danilova	
4	18 December 1999	(Switzerland) Davos	15 km C	(Russia) Olga Danilova	(Russia) Larisa Lazutina	(Norway) Bente Martinsen	
5	27 December 1999	(Switzerland) Engelberg	Sprint C	(Russia) Nina Gavrylyuk	(Norway) Anita Moen	(Russia) Svetlana Nageykina	
6	28 December 1999	(Germany) Garmisch-Partenkirchen	Sprint F	(Estonia) Kristina Šmigun	(Norway) Bente Martinsen	(Czech Republic) Kateřina Neumannová	
7	29 December 1999	(Austria) Kitzbühel	Sprint F	(Norway) Bente Martinsen	(Norway) Maj Helen Sorkmo	(Norway) Anita Moen	
8	8 January 2000	(Russia) Moscow	15 km F	(Finland) Kaisa Varis	(Estonia) Kristina Šmigun	(Russia) Nina Gavrylyuk	
9	12 January 2000	(Czech Republic) Nové Město	10 km C	(Russia) Larisa Lazutina	(Estonia) Kristina Šmigun	(Norway) Bente Martinsen	
10	2 February 2000	(Norway) Trondheim	5 km F	(Italy) Stefania Belmondo	(Russia) Nina Gavrylyuk	(Russia) Yuliya Chepalova	
11	5 February 2000	(Norway) Lillehammer	5 km C + 5 km F Combined Pursuit	(Russia) Larisa Lazutina	(Russia) Olga Danilova	(Russia) Svetlana Nageykina	
12	16 February 2000	(Switzerland) Ulrichen	5 km F	(Estonia) Kristina Šmigun	(Italy) Stefania Belmondo	(Italy) Sabina Valbusa	
13	20 February 2000	(France) Lamoura-Mouthe	44 km F Mass Start	(Italy) Stefania Belmondo	(Estonia) Kristina Šmigun	(Russia) Larisa Lazutina	
14	26 February 2000	(Sweden) Falun	10 km F	(Russia) Yuliya Chepalova	(Italy) Stefania Belmondo	(Russia) Larisa Lazutina	
15	28 February 2000	(Sweden) Stockholm	Sprint C	(Norway) Bente Martinsen	(Finland) Pirjo Manninen	(Finland) Kati Sundqvist	
16	3 March 2000	(Finland) Lahti	Sprint F	(Estonia) Kristina Šmigun	(Norway) Bente Martinsen	(Finland) Kaisa Varis	
17	5 March 2000	(Finland) Lahti	15 km C Mass Start	(Russia) Larisa Lazutina	(Norway) Bente Martinsen	(Norway) Anita Moen	
18	8 March 2000	(Norway) Oslo	Sprint C	(Norway) Bente Martinsen	(Finland) Pirjo Manninen	(Norway) Anita Moen	
19	11 March 2000	(Norway) Oslo	30 km C	(Russia) Olga Danilova	(Russia) Larisa Lazutina	(Finland) Kaisa Varis	
20	17 March 2000	(Italy) Bormio	5 km C	(Norway) Bente Martinsen	(Russia) Olga Danilova	(Finland) Kaisa Varis	
21	18 March 2000	(Italy) Bormio	10 km F Pursuit	(Russia) Yuliya Chepalova	(Italy) Stefania Belmondo	(Finland) Kaisa Varis	

=== Men's team ===
WC	Date	Place	Discipline	Winner	Second	Third	Ref.
1	28 November 1999	(Sweden) Kiruna	4 × 10 km relay F	Italy I Fulvio Valbusa; Maurizio Pozzi; Fabio Maj; Silvio Fauner	Norway I Espen Bjervig; Kristen Skjeldal; Thomas Alsgaard; Tor Arne Hetland	Austria Alexander Marent; Mikhail Botvinov; Achim Walcher; Gerhard Urain	
2	8 December 1999	(Italy) Asiago	Team Sprint F	Germany Tobias Angerer; Peter Schlickenrieder	Norway Frode Estil; Tore Bjonviken	Italy Giorgio Di Centa; Cristian Zorzi	
3	19 December 1999	(Switzerland) Davos	4 × 10 km relay C	Norway I Odd-Bjørn Hjelmeset; Erling Jevne; Espen Bjervig; Frode Estil	Sweden Håkan Nordbäck; Niklas Jonsson; Mathias Fredriksson; Urban Lindgren	Finland Janne Immonen; Mika Myllylä; Harri Kirvesniemi; Jari Isometsä	
4	13 January 2000	(Czech Republic) Nové Město	4 × 10 km relay C/F	Norway I Odd-Bjørn Hjelmeset; Erling Jevne; Kristen Skjeldal; Thomas Alsgaard	Austria Alexander Marent; Mikhail Botvinov; Achim Walcher; Christian Hoffmann	Russia I Vitaly Denisov; Mikhail Ivanov; Vladimir Vilisov; Alexey Prokourorov	
5	27 February 2000	(Sweden) Falun	4 × 10 km relay F	Italy I Fulvio Valbusa; Fabio Maj; Pietro Piller Cottrer; Cristian Zorzi	Russia Vitaly Denisov; Nikolay Bolshakov; Mikhail Ivanov; Vladimir Vilisov	Austria Gerhard Urain; Mikhail Botvinov; Achim Walcher; Christian Hoffmann	
6	4 March 2000	(Finland) Lahti	4 × 10 km relay C/F	Austria Gerhard Urain; Mikhail Botvinov; Achim Walcher; Christian Hoffmann	Finland I Janne Immonen; Harri Kirvesniemi; Teemu Kattilakoski; Sami Repo	Russia I Vitaly Denisov; Mikhail Ivanov; Nikolay Bolshakov; Vladimir Vilisov	

=== Women's team ===
WC	Date	Place	Discipline	Winner	Second	Third	Ref.
1	28 November 1999	(Sweden) Kiruna	4 × 5 km relay F	Russia I Lyubov Yegorova; Irina Skladneva; Anfisa Reztsova; Yuliya Chepalova	Russia II Svetlana Nageykina; Olga Danilova; Larisa Lazutina; Nina Gavrylyuk	Norway Bente Martinsen; Elin Nilsen; Hilde Gjermundshaug Pedersen; Anita Moen	
2	28 November 1999	(Italy) Asiago	Team Sprint F	Norway Anita Moen; Bente Martinsen	Italy Karin Moroder; Stefania Belmondo	Russia Irina Skladneva; Yuliya Chepalova	
3	19 December 1999	(Switzerland) Davos	4 × 5 km relay C	Russia I Svetlana Nageykina; Nina Gavrylyuk; Larisa Lazutina; Olga Danilova	Norway I Anita Moen; Hilde Glomsås; Elin Nilsen; Bente Martinsen	Norway II Tina Bay; Marit Roaldseth; Maj Helen Sorkmo; Rønnaug Schei	
4	13 January 2000	(Czech Republic) Nové Město	4 × 5 km relay C/F	Russia I Olga Danilova; Svetlana Nageykina; Lyubov Yegorova; Larisa Lazutina	Russia II Olga Zavyalova; Nina Gavrylyuk; Irina Skladneva; Yuliya Chepalova	Norway I Anita Moen; Bente Martinsen; Elin Nilsen; Maj Helen Sorkmo	
5	27 February 2000	(Sweden) Falun	4 × 5 km relay F	Russia I Olga Danilova; Olga Zavyalova; Larisa Lazutina; Yuliya Chepalova	Russia II Lyubov Yegorova; Svetlana Nageykina; Irina Skladneva; Nina Gavrylyuk	Italy Gabriella Paruzzi; Sabina Valbusa; Antonella Confortola; Stefania Belmondo	
6	4 March 2000	(Finland) Lahti	4 × 5 km relay C/F	Russia I Olga Danilova; Nina Gavrylyuk; Olga Zavyalova; Yuliya Chepalova	Russia II Lyubov Yegorova; Marina Denisova; Yekaterina Stchastlivaia; Irina Skladneva	Italy Saskia Santer; Gabriella Paruzzi; Antonella Confortola; Sabina Valbusa	

== Men's standings ==
=== Overall ===
Rank	Skier	Points
1	(Spain) Johann Mühlegg	948
2	(Finland) Jari Isometsä	708
3	(Norway) Odd-Bjørn Hjelmeset	586
4	(Sweden) Per Elofsson	536
5	(Norway) Thomas Alsgaard	461
6	(Italy) Fabio Maj	401
7	(Liechtenstein) Stephan Kunz	378
8	(Norway) Espen Bjervig	371
9	(Austria) Mikhail Botvinov	362
10	(Italy) Cristian Zorzi	359

=== Long Distance ===
Rank	Skier	Points
1	(Spain) Johann Mühlegg	315
2	(Russia) Mikhail Ivanov	198
3	(Austria) Mikhail Botvinov	183
4	(Sweden) Per Elofsson	170
5	(Finland) Harri Kirvesniemi	160
6	(Norway) Frode Estil	141
7	(Italy) Fabio Maj	130
8	(Norway) Thomas Alsgaard	125
	(Russia) Vladimir Vilisov	125
10	(Sweden) Niklas Jonsson	105

=== Middle Distance ===
Rank	Skier	Points
1	(Finland) Jari Isometsä	596
2	(Spain) Johann Mühlegg	592
3	(Sweden) Per Elofsson	350
4	(Norway) Thomas Alsgaard	336
5	(Norway) Odd-Bjørn Hjelmeset	245
6	(Liechtenstein) Stephan Kunz	231
7	(Austria) Christian Hoffmann	205
8	(Italy) Cristian Zorzi	199
9	(Finland) Janne Immonen	197
10	(Norway) Erling Jevne	194

=== Sprint ===
Rank	Skier	Points
1	(Norway) Morten Brørs	349
2	(Norway) Odd-Bjørn Hjelmeset	268
3	(Norway) Håvard Solbakken	239
4	(Norway) Tor Arne Hetland	193
5	(Italy) Cristian Zorzi	160
6	(Norway) Håvard Bjerkeli	159
7	(Sweden) Mathias Fredriksson	152
8	(Italy) Silvio Fauner	140
9	(Italy) Fabio Maj	137
	(Norway) Espen Bjervig	137

== Women's standings ==
=== Overall ===
Rank	Skier	Points
1	(Norway) Bente Martinsen	1176
2	(Estonia) Kristina Šmigun	1165
3	(Russia) Larisa Lazutina	1008
4	(Russia) Olga Danilova	880
5	(Russia) Nina Gavrylyuk	857
6	(Italy) Stefania Belmondo	820
7	(Russia) Yuliya Chepalova	712
8	(Finland) Kaisa Varis	680
9	(Norway) Anita Moen	665
10	(Russia) Svetlana Nageykina	548

=== Long Distance ===
Rank	Skier	Points
1	(Russia) Larisa Lazutina	360
2	(Estonia) Kristina Šmigun	266
3	(Russia) Olga Danilova	256
4	(Finland) Kaisa Varis	241
5	(Norway) Bente Martinsen	216
6	(Russia) Nina Gavrylyuk	213
7	(Italy) Stefania Belmondo	211
8	—N/a	—N/a
9	(Russia) Olga Zavyalova	149
10	(Norway) Anita Moen	140

=== Middle Distance ===
Rank	Skier	Points
1	(Estonia) Kristina Šmigun	601
2	(Italy) Stefania Belmondo	585
3	(Russia) Larisa Lazutina	553
4	(Russia) Yuliya Chepalova	511
5	(Russia) Olga Danilova	486
6	(Norway) Bente Martinsen	455
7	(Russia) Nina Gavrylyuk	439
8	(Finland) Kaisa Varis	379
9	—N/a	—N/a
10	(Norway) Anita Moen	225

=== Sprint ===
Rank	Skier	Points
1	(Norway) Bente Martinsen	505
2	(Norway) Anita Moen	300
3	(Estonia) Kristina Šmigun	298
4	(Russia) Nina Gavrylyuk	205
5	(Norway) Maj Helen Sorkmo	192
6	(Finland) Pirjo Manninen	186
7	(Russia) Olga Danilova	138
	(Norway) Hilde G. Pedersen	138
9	(Canada) Beckie Scott	130
10	(Norway) Marit Roaldseth	123

== Achievements ==
Victories in this World Cup (all-time number of victories as of 1999/2000 season in parentheses)

Men

- Johann Mühlegg (ESP), 4 (4) first places
- Jari Isometsä (FIN), 3 (4) first places
- Odd-Bjørn Hjelmeset (NOR), 3 (3) first places
- Thomas Alsgaard (NOR), 2 (7) first places
- Mika Myllylä (FIN), 1 (9) first place
- Harri Kirvesniemi (FIN), 1 (6) first place
- Peter Schlickenrieder (GER), 1 (2) first place
- Erling Jevne (NOR), 1 (2) first place
- Frode Estil (NOR), 1 (1) first place
- Fabio Maj (ITA), 1 (1) first place
- Morten Brørs (NOR), 1 (1) first place
- Cristian Zorzi (ITA), 1 (1) first place
- Mikhail Ivanov (RUS), 1 (1) first place

Women

- Bente Martinsen (NOR), 5 (15) first places
- Larisa Lazutina (RUS), 4 (19) first places
- Kristina Šmigun (EST), 4 (5) first places
- Stefania Belmondo (ITA), 2 (21) first places
- Yuliya Chepalova (RUS), 2 (4) first places
- Olga Danilova (RUS), 2 (3) first places
- Nina Gavrylyuk (RUS), 1 (5) first place
- Kaisa Varis (FIN), 1 (1) first place
