= Steinkjer SK =

Skiing club in Steinkjer, Norway

Logo.

Steinkjer Skiklubb is a Norwegian skiing club from Steinkjer Municipality.

It was founded on 22 December 1885 under the name Indtrøndelagens SF. The name was changed to Steinkjer SK on 19 November 1892. World-level ski jumper Anders Bardal is a member of the club. Other members include ski jumper Ole Marius Ingvaldsen, and cross-country skiers Morten Brørs, Liv Miriam Nordtømme, Kent Ove Clausen, and Arnstein Finstad.

Local rival teams are Henning SL and Skogn IL.
