= Tina Bay =

Norwegian cross-country skier

Personal information
- Nationality: Norway
- Born: May 30, 1973 (age 53) Odda Municipality, Norway

Sport
- Sport: Skiing
- Club: IL Korlevoll-Odda

World Cup career
- Seasons: 10 – (1995–2004)
- Indiv. starts: 71
- Indiv. podiums: 0
- Team starts: 15
- Team podiums: 3
- Team wins: 1
- Overall titles: 0 – (26th in 1999)
- Discipline titles: 0

Tina Bay (born 30 May 1973) is a Norwegian cross-country skier, born in Odda Municipality. She represented the club Korlevoll IL. She competed in 10 km and in pursuit at the 2002 Winter Olympics in Salt Lake City, Utah.

== Cross-country skiing results ==
All results are sourced from the International Ski Federation (FIS).

=== Olympic Games ===
Year	Age	10 km	15 km	Pursuit	30 km	Sprint	4 × 5 km relay
2002	28	25	—	26	—	—	—

=== World Championships ===
Year	Age	5 km	10 km	15 km	Pursuit	30 km	Sprint	4 × 5 km relay
1999	25	—	—N/a	22	—	12	—N/a	—
2001	27	—N/a	11	—	22	CNX^{[a]}	—	—

a. ^{1} Cancelled due to extremely cold weather.

=== World Cup ===
==== Season standings ====
Season	Age					
Season	Age	Overall	Distance	Long Distance	Middle Distance	Sprint
1995	21	NC	—N/a	—N/a	—N/a	—N/a
1996	22	49	—N/a	—N/a	—N/a	—N/a
1997	23	NC	—N/a	NC	—N/a	—
1998	24	42	—N/a	35	—N/a	46
1999	25	26	—N/a	28	—N/a	34
2000	26	33	—N/a	NC	30	27
2001	27	54	—N/a	—N/a	—N/a	70
2002	28	27	—N/a	—N/a	—N/a	25
2003	29	50	—N/a	—N/a	—N/a	56
2004	30	NC	NC	—N/a	—N/a	NC

==== Team podiums ====
- 1 victory
- 3 podiums

No.	Season	Date	Location	Race	Level	Place	Teammates
1	1999–00	19 December 1999	Davos, Switzerland	4 × 5 km Relay C	World Cup	3rd	Roaldseth / Sorkmo / Schei
2	2000–01	9 December 2000	Santa Caterina, Italy	4 × 3 km Relay C/F	World Cup	2nd	Skari / Nilsen / Pedersen
3	2001–02	16 December 2001	Davos, Switzerland	4 × 5 km Relay C/F	World Cup	1st	Skari / Pedersen / Skofterud
