= Håvard Solbakken =

Norwegian cross-country skier

Personal information
- Nationality: Norway
- Born: August 9, 1973 (age 52)

Sport
- Sport: Skiing
- Club: Innstrandens IL

World Cup career
- Seasons: 9 – (1997–2004, 2006)
- Indiv. starts: 52
- Indiv. podiums: 4
- Indiv. wins: 0
- Team starts: 10
- Team podiums: 1
- Team wins: 0
- Overall titles: 0 – (22nd in 2000)
- Discipline titles: 0
Medal record
Men's cross-country skiing
Representing Norway
World Championships
| Silver medal – second place | 2001 Lahti | Individual sprint |

Håvard Solbakken (born August 9, 1973) is a retired Norwegian cross-country skier who competed in the FIS Cross-Country World Cup between 1997 and 2006. He won a bronze medal in the individual sprint at the 2001 FIS Nordic World Ski Championships in Lahti.

== Cross-country skiing results ==
All results are sourced from the International Ski Federation (FIS).

=== World Championships ===
- 1 medal – (1 bronze)

| Year | Age | 15 km | Pursuit | 30 km | 50 km | Sprint | 4 × 10 km relay |
|---|---|---|---|---|---|---|---|
| 2001 | 27 | — | 27 | — | — | Bronze | — |

=== World Cup ===
==== Season standings ====
| Season | Age | | | | | |
| Season | Age | Overall | Distance | Long Distance | Middle Distance | Sprint |
|---|---|---|---|---|---|---|
| 1998 | 24 | 82 | —N/a | NC | —N/a | 68 |
| 1999 | 25 | 28 | —N/a | NC | —N/a | 36 |
| 2000 | 26 | 22 | —N/a | NC | 55 | 3rd place, bronze medalist(s) |
| 2001 | 27 | 38 | —N/a | —N/a | —N/a | 10 |
| 2002 | 28 | 76 | —N/a | —N/a | —N/a | 36 |
| 2003 | 29 | 66 | —N/a | —N/a | —N/a | 37 |
| 2004 | 30 | 94 | 107 | —N/a | —N/a | 47 |
| 2006 | 31 | NC | — | —N/a | —N/a | NC |

==== Individual podiums ====
- 4 podiums

| No. | Season | Date | Location | Race | Level | Place |
|---|---|---|---|---|---|---|
| 1 | 1999–00 | 28 December 1999 | Garmisch-Partenkirchen, Germany | Sprint F | World Cup | 2nd |
| 2 | 1999–00 | 29 December 1999 | Kitzbühel, Austria | Sprint F | World Cup | 2nd |
| 3 | 1999–00 | 28 February 2000 | Stockholm, Sweden | 1 km Sprint C | World Cup | 3rd |
| 4 | 2000-01 | 29 December 2000 | Engelberg, Switzerland | 1 km Sprint F | World Cup | 3rd |

==== Team podiums ====
- 1 podium – (1 TS)

| No. | Season | Date | Location | Race | Level | Place | Teammate |
|---|---|---|---|---|---|---|---|
| 1 | 2003–04 | 7 December 2003 | Toblach, Italy | 6 × 1.2 km Team Sprint F | World Cup | 3rd | Dahl |
