= Johann Mühlegg =

German-born Spanish disqualified cross-country skier

Personal information
- Full name: Johann Mühlegg
- Nationality: Germany; Spain (from 1999)
- Born: 8 November 1970 (age 55) Marktoberdorf, Bavaria, West Germany

Sport
- Sport: Skiing
- Club: SC Garmisch

World Cup career
- Seasons: 10 – (1992–1998, 2000–2002)
- Indiv. starts: 97
- Indiv. podiums: 12
- Indiv. wins: 7
- Team starts: 15
- Team podiums: 0
- Team wins: 0
- Overall titles: 1 – (2000)
- Discipline titles: 1 – (1 LD: 2000)
Medal record
Men's cross-country skiing
Representing Spain
Olympic Games
Disqualified	2002 Salt Lake City	10 km + 10 km combined pursuit
Disqualified	2002 Salt Lake City	30 km freestyle
Disqualified	2002 Salt Lake City	50 km classical
World Championships
Gold medal – first place	2001 Lahti	50 km freestyle
Silver medal – second place	2001 Lahti	10 km + 10 km combined pursuit
Representing West Germany
Junior World Championships
Gold medal – first place	1989 Vang	30 km freestyle
Gold medal – first place	1990 Les Saisies	30 km freestyle
Bronze medal – third place	1990 Les Saisies	4 × 10 km relay

Johann Mühlegg (born 8 November 1970) is a former top level cross-country skier who competed in international competitions first representing Germany and then Spain, after becoming a Spanish citizen in 1999. He was excluded and disqualified from the 2002 Winter Olympics in Salt Lake City for doping.

== Early career ==
Mühlegg participated for Germany in the 1992, 1994 and 1998 Winter Olympics, even though he began having trouble with Germany's ski federation in 1993. From the beginning, Mühlegg singled himself out, at one point accusing German head coach Georg Zipfel for "damaging him spiritually" (the so-called Spiritistenaffäre). He was thrown off the team in 1995, but was reinstated later. But from that moment on, the ever eccentric Mühlegg insisted on taking a flask of holy water with him at all times, and trusting only his Portuguese cleaning woman/chaperone Justina Agostinho. In the end, Mühlegg was branded as a team cancer and was thrown out.

== Competing for Spain ==
After being ejected from the national team after the 1998 Nagano Games, his good relations with members of the Spanish cross-country skiing team, in particular Juan Jesús Gutiérrez Cuevas and Haritz Zunzunegui, opened the door for Mühlegg to obtain Spanish citizenship.

In late 1999, competing for Spain, he won a World Cup race for the first time. At the 2001 FIS Nordic World Ski Championships in Lahti, he won two medals with a silver in the 10 km + 10 km combined pursuit (stepping up when the original medalist Jari Isometsä was disqualified for hemohes use), and a gold in the 50 km freestyle race. These are the only medals ever that Spain has won at the FIS Nordic World Ski Championships.

In the 2002 Winter Olympics in Salt Lake City, Mühlegg won gold medals in the 30 km freestyle and the 10 km + 10 km pursuit races, the successes gaining him congratulations from King Juan Carlos I of Spain.

Mühlegg finished first in the 50 km classical race held on the final Saturday of the Salt Lake City Winter Olympic Games on 23 February 2002 but was disqualified from that race and was expelled from the Games the next day, after testing positive for darbepoetin (a medicine which boosts red blood cell count; the substance was not banned at the time since it had only recently been developed). (Note: Traces of darbepoetin were found in a random urine test on 21 February. Before the 50 km race on 23 February, a random test for hemoglobin levels found Mühlegg above the limit; a second test five minutes later was below the limit, and he was allowed to compete. At the end of the race he came on extremely strong (and, as was later shown, unnaturally strong) to beat Mikhail Ivanov of Russia by 14.9 seconds.)

== Doping controversy ==
Following the darbepoetin scandal, the International Olympic Committee (IOC) initially let Mühlegg keep his gold medals from the first two races; however, a December 2003 ruling by the Court of Arbitration for Sport (CAS) found that those medals should also be withdrawn. The CAS remitted this case as well as similar ones involving Olga Danilova and Larisa Lazutina (both from Russia) to the IOC Executive Board, which confirmed the rulings in February 2004.

== Cross-country skiing results ==
All results are sourced from the International Ski Federation (FIS).

=== Olympic Games ===
Year	Age	10 km	15 km	Pursuit	30 km	50 km	Sprint	4 × 10 km relay
1992	21	31	—N/a	16	—	7	—N/a	6
1994	23	17	—N/a	8	9	—	—N/a	4
1998	27	27	—N/a	17	—	7	—N/a	8
2002	31	—N/a	—	DSQ	DSQ	DSQ	—	—

=== World Championships ===
- 2 medals – (1 gold, 1 silver)

Year	Age	10 km	15 km	Pursuit	30 km	50 km	Sprint	4 × 10 km relay
1991	20	—	15	—N/a	—	22	—N/a	10
1993	22	44	—N/a	17	—	6	—N/a	5
1995	24	29	—N/a	13	—	—	—N/a	—
1997	26	24	—N/a	19	6	23	—N/a	6
2001	30	—N/a	8	Silver	—	Gold	—	—

=== World Cup ===
==== Season standings ====
Season	Age					
Season	Age	Overall	Distance	Long Distance	Middle Distance	Sprint
1992	21	17	—N/a	—N/a	—N/a	—N/a
1993	22	19	—N/a	—N/a	—N/a	—N/a
1994	23	17	—N/a	—N/a	—N/a	—N/a
1995	24	28	—N/a	—N/a	—N/a	—N/a
1996	25	9	—N/a	—N/a	—N/a	—N/a
1997	26	26	—N/a	16	—N/a	41
1998	27	24	—N/a	NC	—N/a	15
2000	29	1st place, gold medalist(s)	—N/a	1st place, gold medalist(s)	2nd place, silver medalist(s)	36
2001	30	2nd place, silver medalist(s)	—N/a	—N/a	—N/a	36
2002	31	8	—N/a	—N/a	—N/a	—

==== Individual podiums ====
- 7 victories
- 12 podiums

No.	Season	Date	Location	Race	Level	Place
1	1999–00	10 December 1999	Sappada, Italy	15 km Individual F	World Cup	1st
2	1999–00	9 January 2000	Moscow, Russia	30 km Individual F	World Cup	1st
3	1999–00	12 January 2000	Nové Město, Czech Republic	15 km Individual C	World Cup	2nd
4	1999–00	5 February 2000	Lillehammer, Norway	10 km + 10 km Skiathlon C/F	World Cup	2nd
5	1999–00	20 February 2000	Transjurassienne, France	72 km Mass Start F	World Cup	1st
6	1999–00	26 February 2000	Falun, Sweden	15 km Individual F	World Cup	1st
7	1999–00	19 March 2000	Bormio, Italy	15 km Pursuit F	World Cup	2nd
8	2000–01	16 December 2000	Brusson, Italy	10 km + 10 km Skiathlon C/F	World Cup	2nd
9	2000–01	10 January 2001	Soldier Hollow, United States	30 km Mass Start F	World Cup	1st
10	2000–01	13 January 2001	Soldier Hollow, United States	10 km Individual C	World Cup	1st
11	2000–01	14 March 2001	Borlänge, Sweden	10 km Individual F	World Cup	3rd
12	2001–02	12 December 2001	Brusson, Italy	15 km Individual F	World Cup	1st

== See also ==
- Cross-country skiing at the 2002 Winter Olympics
- List of sportspeople sanctioned for doping offences
