= Zadov =

Zadov (sometimes transliterated as Zadoff) is a Russian-language surname. It may refer to:

- Lev Zadov, Ukrainian counter-intelligence agent
- Allen Zadoff, American author of young adult fiction
- Solomon A. Zadoff, mathematician, a namesake of the Zadoff–Chu sequence
