= FIS Cross-Country World Cup =

International cross-country skiing competition

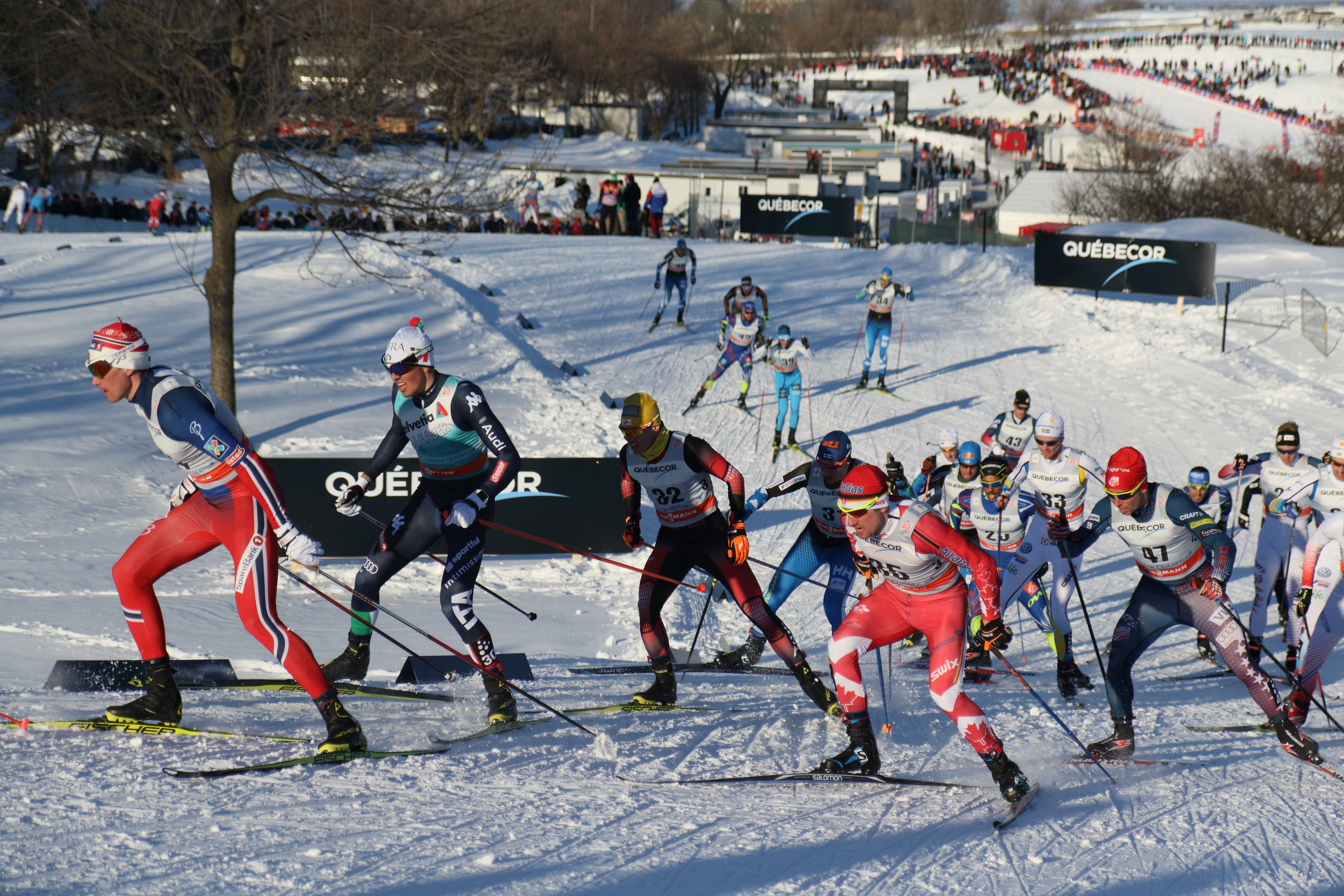
- Genre: Cross-country skiing
- Date: Northern wintertime season
- Begins: November
- Ends: March
- Locations: Europe; Canada; United States (rare); Japan (rare); China (rare); South Korea (rare)
- Inaugurated: 1973 (unofficial - men); 1978 (unofficial - women); 9 January 1982 (men & women)
- Previous event: 2024–25 FIS Cross-Country World Cup
- Next event: 2026–27 FIS Cross-Country World Cup
- Organiser: International Ski Federation
- People: Michel Lamplot (race director); Simon Caprini (asst. race director); Doris Kallen (world cup.coordinator); Synne Dyrhaug (media.coordinator); Leo Mignerey (content.coordinator)
- Sponsor: Coop Norway, Audi e-tron

The FIS Cross-Country World Cup is an annual cross-country skiing competition, arranged by the International Ski Federation (FIS) since 1981. The competition was arranged unofficially between 1973 and 1981, although it received provisional recognition on the 31st FIS Congress, 29–30 April 1977 in Bariloche, Argentina.

The first World Cup races were held on 9 January 1982 and were located in Reit im Winkl, West Germany and Klingenthal, East Germany. Bill Koch of the United States and Berit Aunli of Norway were the overall winners in the first season.

== Rules ==
Competitors attempt to achieve the most points during the season. They compete in two disciplines: Distance and Sprint. Current Distance races are mostly 10 km, 20 km, Skiathlon and 50 km for the men and women. The competitions are held with either individual start or mass start and either classic or free technique. In Sprint races, athletes are organised in heats based on their results in a prologue where the 30 fastest skiers qualify for the sprint's quarter-finals. The 12 best skiers in the quarter-finals advance to the semi-finals and the 6 best skiers in the semi-finals advance to the final. Sprint races are maximum 1.8 kilometres and are competed in either classic or free technique.

In ordinary World Cup races, 100 points are awarded to the winner, 95 for second place, 90 for third place, winding down to 1 point for 50th place. In Stage World Cup races; Tour de Ski, World Cup Final and mini-tours, 50 points are awarded to the winner, 47 for second place, 44 for third place, winding down to 1 point for 30th place. The overall winners of the Stage World Cup events are awarded 300 points for Tour de Ski victory and 200 points for an overall win in the World Cup Final or a mini-tour. The athlete with the most points at the end of the season in mid-March wins the Overall World Cup, with the trophy consisting of a 9 kilogram crystal globe. Sub-prizes are also awarded to the winners of the Sprint World Cup and the Distance World Cup, with a smaller 3.5 kg crystal globe.

Races are hosted primarily in Europe, with regular stops in the Nordic countries and Central Europe. A few races have also been held in North America and Asia. World Cup competitions have been hosted in 21 countries around the world: Austria, Bosnia and Herzegovina, Bulgaria, Canada, China, Czech Republic, Estonia, Finland, France, Germany, Italy, Japan, Norway, Poland, Russia, Slovakia, Slovenia, South Korea, Sweden, Switzerland and the United States. (Note that all World Cup races hosted in Bosnia were held when it was still part of Yugoslavia.)

The World Cup usually follows a November–March schedule, effectively ruling out hosting races in the southern hemisphere, for example in Argentina or New Zealand. Additionally, races have yet to be hosted in the Central Asia-Himalayas region.

Crystal Globe of the World Cup Winner

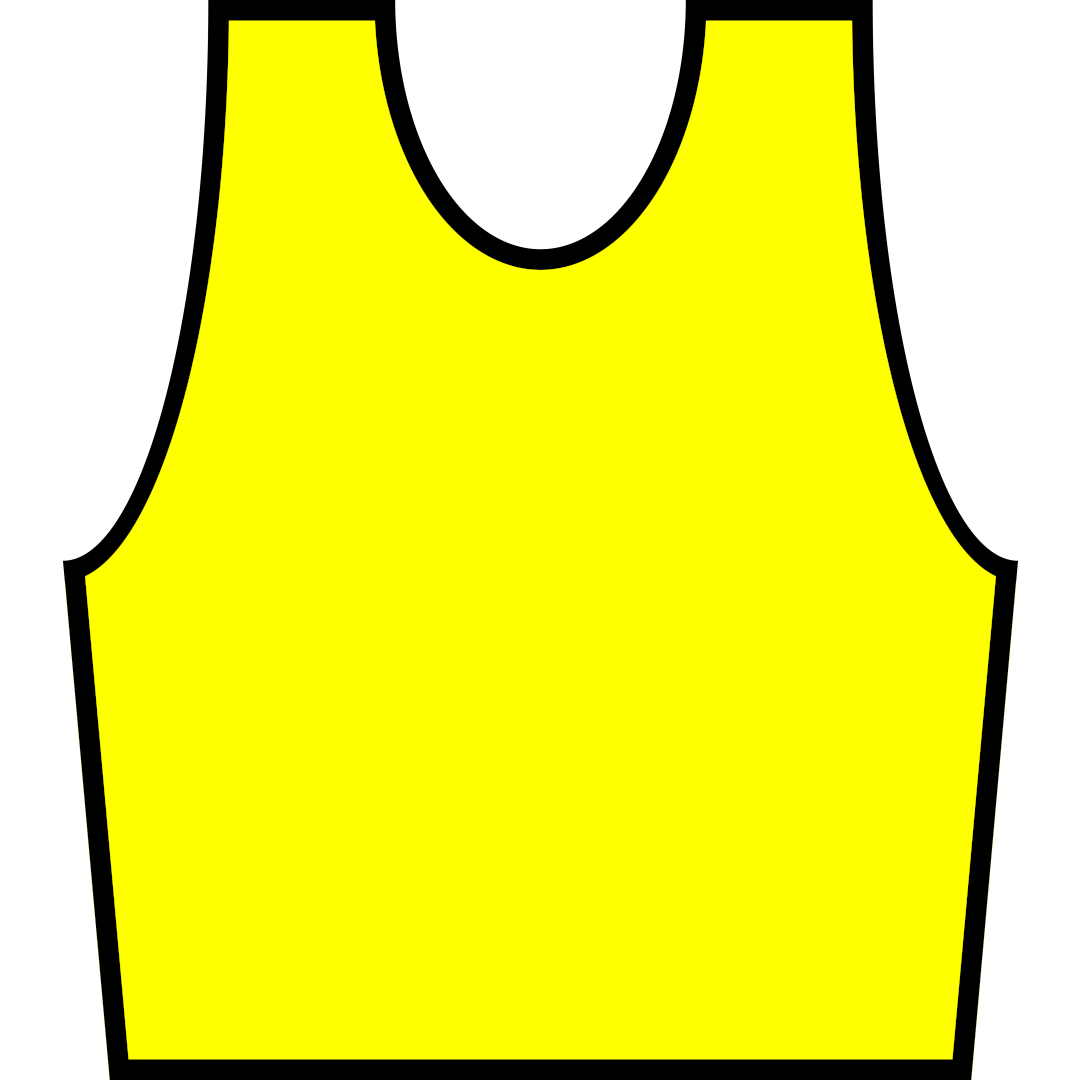
Yellow Bib of the World Cup Leader

== Overall World Cup standings ==
The table below shows the three highest ranked skiers each year.

=== Men ===
Season	Winner	Runner-up	Third
1973–74^{[a]}	(Norway) Ivar Formo	(Finland) Juha Mieto	(Switzerland) Eduard Hauser
1974–75^{[a]}	(Norway) Oddvar Brå	(Norway) Odd Martinsen	(Finland) Juha Mieto
1975–76^{[a]}	(Finland) Juha Mieto	(Finland) Arto Koivisto	(Norway) Ivar Formo
1976–77^{[a]}	(Sweden) Thomas Wassberg	(Finland) Juha Mieto (2)	(Sweden) Thomas Magnusson
1977–78^{[a]}	(Sweden) Sven-Åke Lundbäck	(Norway) Lars-Erik Eriksen	(Norway) Magne Myrmo
1978–79^{[b]}	(Norway) Oddvar Brå (2)	(Norway) Lars-Erik Eriksen (2)	(Sweden) Sven-Åke Lundbäck
1979–80^{[a]}	(Finland) Juha Mieto (2)	(Sweden) Thomas Wassberg	(Norway) Lars-Erik Eriksen
1980–81^{[b]}	(Soviet Union) Alexander Zavyalov	(Norway) Oddvar Brå	(Norway) Ove Aunli
Official World Cup
1981–82	(United States) Bill Koch	(Sweden) Thomas Wassberg	(Finland) Harri Kirvesniemi
1982–83	(Soviet Union) Alexander Zavyalov (2)	(Sweden) Gunde Svan	(United States) Bill Koch
1983–84	(Sweden) Gunde Svan	(Sweden) Thomas Wassberg	(Finland) Harri Kirvesniemi (2)
1984–85	(Sweden) Gunde Svan	(Norway) Tor Håkon Holte	(Norway) Ove Aunli (2)
1985–86	(Sweden) Gunde Svan	(Sweden) Torgny Mogren	(Soviet Union) Vladimir Smirnov
1986–87	(Sweden) Torgny Mogren	(Sweden) Thomas Wassberg (4)	(Sweden) Gunde Svan
1987–88	(Sweden) Gunde Svan	(Sweden) Torgny Mogren	(Norway) Pål Gunnar Mikkelsplass
1988–89	(Sweden) Gunde Svan (5)	(Norway) Vegard Ulvang	(Sweden) Torgny Mogren
1989–90	(Norway) Vegard Ulvang	(Sweden) Gunde Svan (2)	(Norway) Bjørn Dæhlie
1990–91	(Soviet Union) Vladimir Smirnov	(Sweden) Torgny Mogren (3)	(Norway) Bjørn Dæhlie (2)
1991–92	(Norway) Bjørn Dæhlie	(Norway) Vegard Ulvang (2)	(Commonwealth of Independent States) Vladimir Smirnov
1992–93	(Norway) Bjørn Dæhlie	(Kazakhstan) Vladimir Smirnov	(Norway) Vegard Ulvang
1993–94	(Kazakhstan) Vladimir Smirnov (2)	(Norway) Bjørn Dæhlie	(Finland) Jari Isometsä
1994–95	(Norway) Bjørn Dæhlie	(Kazakhstan) Vladimir Smirnov	(Italy) Silvio Fauner
1995–96	(Norway) Bjørn Dæhlie	(Kazakhstan) Vladimir Smirnov (3)	(Finland) Jari Isometsä (2)
1996–97	(Norway) Bjørn Dæhlie	(Finland) Mika Myllylä	(Italy) Fulvio Valbusa
1997–98	(Norway) Thomas Alsgaard	(Norway) Bjørn Dæhlie (2)	(Kazakhstan) Vladimir Smirnov (3)
1998–99	(Norway) Bjørn Dæhlie (6)	(Austria) Mikhail Botvinov	(Finland) Mika Myllylä
1999–00	(Spain) Johann Mühlegg	(Finland) Jari Isometsä	(Norway) Odd-Bjørn Hjelmeset
2000–01	(Sweden) Per Elofsson	(Spain) Johann Mühlegg	(Norway) Thomas Alsgaard
2001–02	(Sweden) Per Elofsson (2)	(Norway) Thomas Alsgaard	(Norway) Anders Aukland
2002–03	(Sweden) Mathias Fredriksson	(Germany) René Sommerfeldt	(Sweden) Jörgen Brink
2003–04	(Germany) René Sommerfeldt	(Sweden) Mathias Fredriksson	(Norway) Jens Arne Svartedal
2004–05	(Germany) Axel Teichmann	(France) Vincent Vittoz	(Norway) Tor Arne Hetland
2005–06	(Germany) Tobias Angerer	(Norway) Jens Arne Svartedal	(Norway) Tor Arne Hetland (2)
2006–07	(Germany) Tobias Angerer (2)	(Russia) Alexander Legkov	(Norway) Eldar Rønning
2007–08	(Czech Republic) Lukáš Bauer	(Germany) René Sommerfeldt (2)	(Italy) Pietro Piller Cottrer
2008–09	(Switzerland) Dario Cologna	(Norway) Petter Northug	(Norway) Ola Vigen Hattestad
2009–10	(Norway) Petter Northug	(Czech Republic) Lukáš Bauer	(Sweden) Marcus Hellner
2010–11	(Switzerland) Dario Cologna	(Norway) Petter Northug	(Sweden) Daniel Rickardsson
2011–12	(Switzerland) Dario Cologna	(Canada) Devon Kershaw	(Norway) Petter Northug
2012–13	(Norway) Petter Northug (2)	(Russia) Alexander Legkov	(Switzerland) Dario Cologna
2013–14	(Norway) Martin Johnsrud Sundby	(Russia) Alexander Legkov (3)	(Canada) Alex Harvey
2014–15	(Switzerland) Dario Cologna (4)	(Norway) Petter Northug	(Sweden) Calle Halfvarsson
2015–16	(Norway) Martin Johnsrud Sundby	(Norway) Petter Northug (4)	(Norway) Finn Hågen Krogh
2016–17	(Norway) Martin Johnsrud Sundby (3)	(Russia) Sergey Ustiugov	(Canada) Alex Harvey (2)
2017–18	(Norway) Johannes Høsflot Klæbo	(Switzerland) Dario Cologna	(Norway) Martin Johnsrud Sundby
2018–19	(Norway) Johannes Høsflot Klæbo	(Russia) Alexander Bolshunov	(Norway) Sjur Røthe
2019–20	(Russia) Alexander Bolshunov	(Norway) Johannes Høsflot Klæbo	(Norway) Pål Golberg
2020–21	(Russia) Alexander Bolshunov (2)	(Russia) Ivan Yakimushkin	(Norway) Johannes Høsflot Klæbo
2021–22	(Norway) Johannes Høsflot Klæbo	(Russia) Alexander Bolshunov (2)	(Finland) Iivo Niskanen
2022–23	(Norway) Johannes Høsflot Klæbo	(Norway) Pål Golberg	(Italy) Federico Pellegrino
2023–24	(Norway) Harald Østberg Amundsen	(Norway) Johannes Høsflot Klæbo (2)	(Norway) Erik Valnes
2024–25	(Norway) Johannes Høsflot Klæbo	(Sweden) Edvin Anger	(Norway) Erik Valnes (2)
2025–26	(Norway) Johannes Høsflot Klæbo (6)	(Norway) Harald Østberg Amundsen	(Italy) Federico Pellegrino (2)

a. ^{1} ^{2} ^{3} ^{4} ^{5} ^{6} Unofficial World Cup
b. ^{1} ^{2} Trial World Cup

=== Women ===
Season	Winner	Runner-up	Third
1973–74	—N/a		
1974–75	—N/a		
1975–76	—N/a		
1976–77	—N/a		
1977–78	—N/a		
1978–79^{[a]}	(Soviet Union) Galina Kulakova	(Soviet Union) Raisa Smetanina	(Soviet Union) Zinaida Amosova
1979–80	—N/a		
1980–81^{[a]}	(Soviet Union) Raisa Smetanina	(Norway) Berit Aunli	(Czechoslovakia) Květoslava Jeriová-Pecková
Official World Cup
1981–82	(Norway) Berit Aunli	(Norway) Britt Pettersen	(Czechoslovakia) Květoslava Jeriová-Pecková
1982–83	(Finland) Marja-Liisa Hämäläinen (Note: Marja-Liisa Hämäläinen married with Harri Kirvesniemi in 1984 and have used her married name since then.)	(Norway) Britt Pettersen (2)	(Czechoslovakia) Květoslava Jeriová-Pecková (3)
1983–84	(Finland) Marja-Liisa Hämäläinen (2)	(Soviet Union) Raisa Smetanina (2)	(Norway) Anne Jahren
1984–85	(Norway) Anette Bøe	(Norway) Grete Ingeborg Nykkelmo	(Norway) Britt Pettersen
1985–86	(Finland) Marjo Matikainen	(Norway) Marianne Dahlmo	(Norway) Britt Pettersen (2)
1986–87	(Finland) Marjo Matikainen	(Soviet Union) Anfisa Reztsova	(Norway) Marianne Dahlmo
1987–88	(Finland) Marjo Matikainen (3)	(Sweden) Marie-Helene Westin	(Finland) Marja-Liisa Kirvesniemi
1988–89	(Soviet Union) Yelena Välbe	(Czechoslovakia) Alžběta Havrančíková	(Soviet Union) Tamara Tikhonova
1989–90	(Soviet Union) Larisa Lazutina	(Soviet Union) Yelena Välbe	(Norway) Trude Dybendahl
1990–91	(Soviet Union) Yelena Välbe	(Italy) Stefania Belmondo	(Soviet Union) Lyubov Yegorova
1991–92	(Commonwealth of Independent States) Yelena Välbe	(Italy) Stefania Belmondo	(Commonwealth of Independent States) Lyubov Yegorova (2)
1992–93	(Russia) Lyubov Yegorova	(Russia) Yelena Välbe	(Italy) Stefania Belmondo
1993–94	(Italy) Manuela Di Centa	(Russia) Lyubov Yegorova	(Russia) Yelena Välbe
1994–95	(Russia) Yelena Välbe	(Russia) Nina Gavrylyuk	(Russia) Larisa Lazutina
1995–96	(Italy) Manuela Di Centa (2)	(Russia) Yelena Välbe (3)	(Russia) Larisa Lazutina
1996–97	(Russia) Yelena Välbe (5)	(Italy) Stefania Belmondo	(Czech Republic) Kateřina Neumannová
1997–98	(Russia) Larisa Lazutina (2)	(Norway) Bente Martinsen (Note: Bente Martinsen married with Geir Skari in 1999 and have used her married name since then.)	(Italy) Stefania Belmondo
1998–99	(Norway) Bente Martinsen	(Italy) Stefania Belmondo (4)	(Russia) Nina Gavrylyuk
1999–00	(Norway) Bente Martinsen	(Estonia) Kristina Šmigun	(Russia) Larisa Lazutina
2000–01	(Russia) Yuliya Chepalova	(Norway) Bente Skari (2)	(Russia) Larisa Lazutina (4)
2001–02	(Norway) Bente Skari	(Czech Republic) Kateřina Neumannová	(Italy) Stefania Belmondo (3)
2002–03	(Norway) Bente Skari (4)	(Estonia) Kristina Šmigun (2)	(Italy) Gabriella Paruzzi
2003–04	(Italy) Gabriella Paruzzi	(Norway) Marit Bjørgen	(Ukraine) Valentyna Shevchenko
2004–05	(Norway) Marit Bjørgen	(Czech Republic) Kateřina Neumannová (2)	(Finland) Virpi Kuitunen
2005–06	(Norway) Marit Bjørgen	(Canada) Beckie Scott	(Russia) Yuliya Chepalova
2006–07	(Finland) Virpi Kuitunen	(Norway) Marit Bjørgen	(Czech Republic) Kateřina Neumannová (2)
2007–08	(Finland) Virpi Kuitunen (2)	(Norway) Astrid Jacobsen	(Poland) Justyna Kowalczyk
2008–09	(Poland) Justyna Kowalczyk	(Slovenia) Petra Majdič	(Finland) Aino-Kaisa Saarinen
2009–10	(Poland) Justyna Kowalczyk	(Norway) Marit Bjørgen	(Slovenia) Petra Majdič
2010–11	(Poland) Justyna Kowalczyk	(Norway) Marit Bjørgen	(Italy) Arianna Follis
2011–12	(Norway) Marit Bjørgen	(Poland) Justyna Kowalczyk	(Norway) Therese Johaug
2012–13	(Poland) Justyna Kowalczyk (4)	(Norway) Therese Johaug	(United States) Kikkan Randall
2013–14	(Norway) Therese Johaug	(Norway) Marit Bjørgen (5)	(Norway) Astrid Uhrenholdt Jacobsen
2014–15	(Norway) Marit Bjørgen (4)	(Norway) Therese Johaug (2)	(Norway) Heidi Weng
2015–16	(Norway) Therese Johaug	(Norway) Ingvild Flugstad Østberg	(Norway) Heidi Weng (2)
2016–17	(Norway) Heidi Weng	(Finland) Krista Pärmäkoski	(Norway) Ingvild Flugstad Østberg
2017–18	(Norway) Heidi Weng (2)	(United States) Jessie Diggins	(Norway) Ingvild Flugstad Østberg (2)
2018–19	(Norway) Ingvild Flugstad Østberg	(Russia) Natalya Nepryayeva	(Norway) Therese Johaug (2)
2019–20	(Norway) Therese Johaug (3)	(Norway) Heidi Weng	(Russia) Natalya Nepryayeva
2020–21	(United States) Jessie Diggins	(Russia) Yuliya Stupak	(Sweden) Ebba Andersson
2021–22	(Russia) Natalya Nepryayeva	(United States) Jessie Diggins	(Sweden) Ebba Andersson (2)
2022–23	(Norway) Tiril Udnes Weng	(United States) Jessie Diggins (3)	(Finland) Kerttu Niskanen
2023–24	(United States) Jessie Diggins	(Sweden) Linn Svahn	(Sweden) Frida Karlsson
2024–25	(United States) Jessie Diggins	(Germany) Victoria Carl	(Finland) Kerttu Niskanen (2)
2025–26	(United States) Jessie Diggins (4)	(Sweden) Moa Ilar	(Sweden) Maja Dahlqvist

a. ^{1} ^{2} Trial World Cup

Rank	Nation	Gold	Silver	Bronze	Total
1	Norway	39	35	37	111
2	Sweden	11	14	12	37
3	Finland	9	6	12	27
4	Russia	8	13	8	29
5	Soviet Union	8	4	4	16
6	United States	5	3	2	10
7	Germany	4	3		7
8	Switzerland	4	1	2	7
9	Poland	4	1	1	6
10	Italy	3	4	10	17
11	Czech Republic	1	3	2	6
12	Kazakhstan	1	3	1	5
13	Spain	1	1		2
14	CIS	1		2	3
15	Canada		2	2	4
16	Estonia		2		2
17	Czechoslovakia		1	3	4
18	Slovenia		1	1	2
19	Austria		1		1
19	France		1		1
21	Ukraine			1	1

- With six overall World Cup titles each Bjørn Dæhlie and Johannes Høsflot Klæbo are record-holders among both men and women.

== Sprint World Cup standings ==
=== Men ===
Season	Winner	Runner-up	Third
1996–97	(Norway) Bjørn Dæhlie	(Italy) Fulvio Valbusa	(Italy) Silvio Fauner
1997–98	(Norway) Thomas Alsgaard	(Norway) Bjørn Dæhlie	(Kazakhstan) Vladimir Smirnov
1998–99	(Norway) Bjørn Dæhlie (2)	(Norway) Odd-Bjørn Hjelmeset	(Sweden) Mathias Fredriksson
1999–00	(Norway) Morten Brørs	(Norway) Odd-Bjørn Hjelmeset (2)	(Norway) Håvard Solbakken
2000–01	(Norway) Jan Jacob Verdenius	(Italy) Cristian Zorzi	(Norway) Tor Arne Hetland
2001–02	(Norway) Trond Iversen	(Norway) Jens Arne Svartedal	(Italy) Cristian Zorzi
2002–03	(Sweden) Thobias Fredriksson	(Norway) Tor Arne Hetland	(Finland) Lauri Pyykönen
2003–04	(Sweden) Thobias Fredriksson (2)	(Norway) Jens Arne Svartedal (2)	(Norway) Håvard Bjerkeli
2004–05	(Norway) Tor Arne Hetland	(Norway) Eldar Rønning	(Norway) Trond Iversen
2005–06	(Sweden) Björn Lind	(Sweden) Thobias Fredriksson	(Norway) Tor Arne Hetland
2006–07	(Norway) Jens Arne Svartedal	(Norway) Trond Iversen	(Sweden) Emil Jönsson
2007–08	(Norway) Ola Vigen Hattestad	(Sweden) Emil Jönsson	(Norway) John Kristian Dahl
2008–09	(Norway) Ola Vigen Hattestad	(Italy) Renato Pasini	(Norway) Tor Arne Hetland (3)
2009–10	(Sweden) Emil Jönsson	(Norway) Petter Northug	(Russia) Alexey Petukhov
2010–11	(Sweden) Emil Jönsson	(Norway) Ola Vigen Hattestad	(Sweden) Jesper Modin
2011–12	(Sweden) Teodor Peterson	(Russia) Nikolay Morilov	(Norway) Eirik Brandsdal
2012–13	(Sweden) Emil Jönsson (3)	(Norway) Petter Northug	(Russia) Nikita Kryukov
2013–14	(Norway) Ola Vigen Hattestad (3)	(Norway) Eirik Brandsdal	(Germany) Josef Wenzl
2014–15	(Norway) Finn Hågen Krogh	(Norway) Eirik Brandsdal (2)	(Italy) Federico Pellegrino
2015–16	(Italy) Federico Pellegrino	(Norway) Petter Northug (3)	(Norway) Finn Hågen Krogh
2016–17	(Norway) Johannes Høsflot Klæbo	(Italy) Federico Pellegrino	(Norway) Sindre Bjørnestad Skar
2017–18	(Norway) Johannes Høsflot Klæbo	(Italy) Federico Pellegrino	(France) Lucas Chanavat
2018–19	(Norway) Johannes Høsflot Klæbo	(Italy) Federico Pellegrino (3)	(Norway) Eirik Brandsdal (2)
2019–20	(Norway) Johannes Høsflot Klæbo	(Norway) Erik Valnes	(Norway) Pål Golberg
2020–21	(Italy) Federico Pellegrino (2)	(Russia) Gleb Retivykh	(Russia) Alexander Bolshunov
2021–22	(France) Richard Jouve	(Norway) Johannes Høsflot Klæbo	(France) Lucas Chanavat
2022–23	(Norway) Johannes Høsflot Klæbo	(France) Lucas Chanavat	(Norway) Even Northug
2023–24	(Norway) Johannes Høsflot Klæbo	(Norway) Erik Valnes	(France) Lucas Chanavat (3)
2024–25	(Norway) Johannes Høsflot Klæbo	(Norway) Erik Valnes (3)	(Sweden) Edvin Anger
2025–26	(Norway) Johannes Høsflot Klæbo (8)	(Norway) Lars Heggen	(Italy) Federico Pellegrino (2)

=== Women ===
Season	Winner	Runner-up	Third
1996–97	(Italy) Stefania Belmondo	(Russia) Yelena Välbe	(Czech Republic) Kateřina Neumannová
1997–98	(Norway) Bente Martinsen	(Russia) Larisa Lazutina	(Italy) Stefania Belmondo
1998–99	(Norway) Bente Martinsen	(Czech Republic) Kateřina Neumannová	(Estonia) Kristina Šmigun
1999–00	(Norway) Bente Martinsen	(Norway) Anita Moen	(Estonia) Kristina Šmigun (2)
2000–01	(Norway) Bente Skari	(Finland) Pirjo Manninen	(Germany) Manuela Henkel
2001–02	(Norway) Bente Skari (5)	(Norway) Anita Moen (2)	(Czech Republic) Kateřina Neumannová (2)
2002–03	(Norway) Marit Bjørgen	(Norway) Bente Skari^{[a]}	(Finland) Pirjo Manninen
2003–04	(Norway) Marit Bjørgen	(Italy) Gabriella Paruzzi	(Sweden) Anna Dahlberg
2004–05	(Norway) Marit Bjørgen	(Finland) Virpi Kuitunen	(Sweden) Anna Dahlberg (2)
2005–06	(Norway) Marit Bjørgen	(Norway) Ella Gjømle	(Canada) Beckie Scott
2006–07	(Finland) Virpi Kuitunen	(Slovenia) Petra Majdič	(Russia) Natalya Matveyeva
2007–08	(Slovenia) Petra Majdič	(Norway) Astrid Jacobsen	(Finland) Virpi Kuitunen
2008–09	(Slovenia) Petra Majdič	(Italy) Arianna Follis	(Finland) Pirjo Muranen (2)
2009–10	(Poland) Justyna Kowalczyk	(Norway) Marit Bjørgen	(Slovenia) Petra Majdič
2010–11	(Slovenia) Petra Majdič (3)	(Italy) Arianna Follis (2)	(United States) Kikkan Randall
2011–12	(United States) Kikkan Randall	(Norway) Maiken Caspersen Falla	(Norway) Marit Bjørgen
2012–13	(United States) Kikkan Randall	(Poland) Justyna Kowalczyk	(Norway) Ingvild Flugstad Østberg
2013–14	(United States) Kikkan Randall (3)	(Germany) Denise Herrmann	(Norway) Marit Bjørgen (2)
2014–15	(Norway) Marit Bjørgen (5)	(Norway) Ingvild Flugstad Østberg	(Norway) Maiken Caspersen Falla
2015–16	(Norway) Maiken Caspersen Falla	(Norway) Ingvild Flugstad Østberg (2)	(Sweden) Stina Nilsson
2016–17	(Norway) Maiken Caspersen Falla	(Sweden) Stina Nilsson	(Sweden) Hanna Falk
2017–18	(Norway) Maiken Caspersen Falla (3)	(Sweden) Stina Nilsson (2)	(United States) Sophie Caldwell
2018–19	(Sweden) Stina Nilsson	(Norway) Maiken Caspersen Falla (2)	(Sweden) Maja Dahlqvist
2019–20	(Sweden) Linn Svahn	(Sweden) Jonna Sundling	(Slovenia) Anamarija Lampič
2020–21	(Slovenia) Anamarija Lampič	(Switzerland) Nadine Fähndrich	(Sweden) Linn Svahn
2021–22	(Sweden) Maja Dahlqvist	(Slovenia) Anamarija Lampič	(Sweden) Jonna Sundling
2022–23	(Sweden) Maja Dahlqvist	(Switzerland) Nadine Fähndrich	(Norway) Tiril Udnes Weng
2023–24	(Sweden) Linn Svahn (2)	(Norway) Kristine Stavås Skistad	(Sweden) Jonna Sundling (2)
2024–25	(Finland) Jasmi Joensuu	(Switzerland) Nadine Fähndrich (3)	(Sweden) Maja Dahlqvist (2)
2025–26	(Sweden) Maja Dahlqvist (3)	(Sweden) Johanna Hagström	(Switzerland) Nadine Fähndrich

Rank	Nation	Gold	Silver	Bronze	Total
1	Norway	33	30	18	81
2	Sweden	13	6	13	32
3	Slovenia	4	2	2	8
4	Italy	3	9	5	17
5	Finland	3	2	4	9
6	United States	3		2	5
7	France	1	1	3	5
8	Poland	1	1		2
9	Russia		4	3	7
10	Switzerland		3	1	4
11	Germany		1	2	3
12	Czech Republic		1	1	2
13	Estonia			2	2
14	Canada			1	1
15	Kazakhstan			1	1

== Distance World Cup standings ==
=== Men ===
Season		Winner	Runner-up	Third
1996–97^{[a]}		(Finland) Mika Myllylä	(Norway) Bjørn Dæhlie	(Kazakhstan) Vladimir Smirnov
1997–98^{[a]}		(Norway) Thomas Alsgaard	(Norway) Bjørn Dæhlie	(Finland) Mika Myllylä
1998–99^{[a]}		(Austria) Mikhail Botvinov	(Norway) Bjørn Dæhlie (3)	(Finland) Mika Myllylä (2)
1999–00	LD	(Spain) Johann Mühlegg	(Russia) Mikhail Ivanov	(Austria) Mikhail Botvinov
1999–00	MD	(Finland) Jari Isometsä	(Spain) Johann Mühlegg	(Sweden) Per Elofsson
2000–01		—N/a		
2001–02		—N/a		
2002–03		—N/a		
2003–04		(Germany) René Sommerfeldt	(Sweden) Mathias Fredriksson	(Norway) Frode Estil
2004–05		(Germany) Axel Teichmann	(France) Vincent Vittoz	(Germany) Tobias Angerer
2005–06		(Germany) Tobias Angerer	(France) Vincent Vittoz	(Sweden) Anders Södergren
2006–07		(Germany) Tobias Angerer (2)	(France) Vincent Vittoz (3)	(Norway) Odd-Bjørn Hjelmeset
2007–08		(Czech Republic) Lukáš Bauer	(Italy) Pietro Piller Cottrer	(Germany) René Sommerfeldt
2008–09		(Italy) Pietro Piller Cottrer	(Switzerland) Dario Cologna	(Norway) Petter Northug
2009–10		(Norway) Petter Northug	(Czech Republic) Lukáš Bauer	(Sweden) Marcus Hellner
2010–11		(Switzerland) Dario Cologna	(Sweden) Daniel Rickardsson	(Czech Republic) Lukáš Bauer
2011–12		(Switzerland) Dario Cologna	(Canada) Devon Kershaw	(Russia) Alexander Legkov
2012–13		(Russia) Alexander Legkov	(Switzerland) Dario Cologna (2)	(Norway) Petter Northug (2)
2013–14		(Norway) Martin Johnsrud Sundby	(Russia) Alexander Legkov	(Sweden) Daniel Rickardsson
2014–15		(Switzerland) Dario Cologna	(Norway) Martin Johnsrud Sundby	(Russia) Evgeniy Belov
2015–16		(Norway) Martin Johnsrud Sundby	(France) Maurice Manificat	(Norway) Niklas Dyrhaug
2016–17		(Norway) Martin Johnsrud Sundby (3)	(Canada) Alex Harvey	(Finland) Matti Heikkinen
2017–18		(Switzerland) Dario Cologna (4)	(Norway) Martin Johnsrud Sundby (2)	(Norway) Hans Christer Holund
2018–19		(Russia) Alexander Bolshunov	(Norway) Sjur Røthe	(Norway) Martin Johnsrud Sundby
2019–20		(Russia) Alexander Bolshunov	(Norway) Sjur Røthe (2)	(Finland) Iivo Niskanen
2020–21		(Russia) Alexander Bolshunov (3)	(Russia) Ivan Yakimushkin	(Norway) Simen Hegstad Krüger
2021–22		(Finland) Iivo Niskanen	(Russia) Alexander Bolshunov	(Norway) Johannes Høsflot Klæbo
2022–23		(Norway) Pål Golberg	(Norway) Johannes Høsflot Klæbo	(Norway) Didrik Tønseth
2023–24		(Norway) Harald Østberg Amundsen	(Norway) Johannes Høsflot Klæbo (2)	(Norway) Pål Golberg
2024–25		(Norway) Simen Hegstad Krüger	(Norway) Martin Løwstrøm Nyenget	(France) Hugo Lapalus
2025–26		(Norway) Johannes Høsflot Klæbo	(Norway) Harald Østberg Amundsen	(Norway) Andreas Fjorden Ree

a. ^{1} ^{2} ^{3} Arranged under the name of "Long Distance World Cup".

=== Women ===
Season		Winner	Runner-up	Third
1996–97^{[a]}		(Russia) Yelena Välbe	(Italy) Stefania Belmondo	(Russia) Nina Gavrylyuk
1997–98^{[a]}		(Russia) Larisa Lazutina	(Italy) Stefania Belmondo	(Russia) Olga Danilova
1998–99^{[a]}		(Estonia) Kristina Šmigun	(Italy) Stefania Belmondo	(Russia) Larisa Lazutina
1999–00	LD	(Russia) Larisa Lazutina (2)	(Estonia) Kristina Šmigun	(Russia) Olga Danilova (2)
1999–00	MD	(Estonia) Kristina Šmigun (2)	(Italy) Stefania Belmondo (4)	(Russia) Larisa Lazutina (2)
2000–01		—N/a		
2001–02		—N/a		
2002–03		—N/a		
2003–04		(Ukraine) Valentyna Shevchenko	(Italy) Gabriella Paruzzi	(Estonia) Kristina Šmigun
2004–05		(Norway) Marit Bjørgen	(Czech Republic) Kateřina Neumannová	(Estonia) Kristina Šmigun (2)
2005–06		(Russia) Yuliya Chepalova	(Czech Republic) Kateřina Neumannová	(Canada) Beckie Scott
2006–07		(Finland) Virpi Kuitunen	(Czech Republic) Kateřina Neumannová (3)	(Finland) Aino-Kaisa Saarinen
2007–08		(Finland) Virpi Kuitunen (2)	(Ukraine) Valentyna Shevchenko	(Poland) Justyna Kowalczyk
2008–09		(Poland) Justyna Kowalczyk	(Finland) Aino-Kaisa Saarinen	(Italy) Marianna Longa
2009–10		(Poland) Justyna Kowalczyk	(Norway) Marit Bjørgen	(Norway) Kristin Størmer Steira
2010–11		(Poland) Justyna Kowalczyk	(Norway) Marit Bjørgen	(Norway) Therese Johaug
2011–12		(Norway) Marit Bjørgen	(Poland) Justyna Kowalczyk	(Norway) Therese Johaug (2)
2012–13		(Poland) Justyna Kowalczyk (4)	(Norway) Therese Johaug	(Norway) Kristin Størmer Steira (2)
2013–14		(Norway) Therese Johaug	(Norway) Marit Bjørgen	(Finland) Kerttu Niskanen
2014–15		(Norway) Marit Bjørgen (3)	(Norway) Therese Johaug (2)	(Norway) Heidi Weng
2015–16		(Norway) Therese Johaug	(Norway) Heidi Weng	(Norway) Ingvild Flugstad Østberg
2016–17		(Norway) Heidi Weng	(Norway) Marit Bjørgen (4)	(Finland) Krista Pärmäkoski
2017–18		(Norway) Heidi Weng (2)	(Norway) Ingvild Flugstad Østberg	(United States) Jessie Diggins
2018–19		(Norway) Therese Johaug	(Norway) Ingvild Flugstad Østberg (2)	(Russia) Natalya Nepryayeva
2019–20		(Norway) Therese Johaug	(Norway) Heidi Weng (2)	(Sweden) Ebba Andersson
2020–21		(United States) Jessie Diggins	(Sweden) Ebba Andersson	(Russia) Yuliya Stupak
2021–22		(Norway) Therese Johaug (5)	(Sweden) Frida Karlsson	(Finland) Krista Pärmäkoski (2)
2022–23		(Finland) Kerttu Niskanen	(United States) Jessie Diggins	(Norway) Tiril Udnes Weng
2023–24		(United States) Jessie Diggins	(Germany) Victoria Carl	(Sweden) Ebba Andersson (2)
2024–25		(United States) Jessie Diggins	(Norway) Astrid Øyre Slind	(Germany) Victoria Carl
2025–26		(United States) Jessie Diggins (4)	(Sweden) Moa Ilar	(Norway) Heidi Weng (2)

a. ^{1} ^{2} ^{3} Arranged under the name of "Long Distance World Cup".

Rank	Nation	Gold	Silver	Bronze	Total
1	Norway	18	21	18	57
2	Finland	5	1	8	15
3	Russia	4	4	9	17
4	Switzerland	4	2		6
5	Germany	4	1	3	8
6	Poland	4	1	1	6
7	United States	4	1	1	6
8	Estonia	2	1	2	5
9	Italy	1	6	1	8
10	Czech Republic	1	4	1	6
11	Spain	1	1		2
12	Ukraine	1	1		2
13	Austria	1		1	2
14	Sweden		5	2	7
15	Canada		2	1	3
16	France		1	1	2
17	Kazakhstan			1	1

== U23 World Cup standings ==
=== Men ===
Season	Winner	Runner-up	Third
2014–15	(Italy) Francesco De Fabiani	(Russia) Sergey Ustiugov	(Norway) Sondre Turvoll Fossli
2015–16	(Italy) Francesco De Fabiani (2)	(Norway) Sondre Turvoll Fossli	(France) Richard Jouve
2016–17	(Norway) Johannes Høsflot Klæbo	(Sweden) Jens Burman	(France) Lucas Chanavat
2017–18	(Norway) Johannes Høsflot Klæbo	(Russia) Alexander Bolshunov	(Russia) Aleksey Chervotkin
2018–19	(Norway) Johannes Høsflot Klæbo (3)	(Russia) Alexander Bolshunov (2)	(Russia) Denis Spitsov
2019–20	(France) Hugo Lapalus	(Russia) Alexander Terentyev	(Finland) Verneri Suhonen
2020–21	(France) Hugo Lapalus (2)	(United States) Gus Schumacher	(Russia) Alexander Terentyev
2021–22	(Russia) Alexander Terentyev	(Germany) Friedrich Moch	(Sweden) William Poromaa
2022–23	(United States) Ben Ogden	(Sweden) William Poromaa	(Sweden) Edvin Anger
2023–24	(Sweden) Edvin Anger	(Italy) Elia Barp	(United States) Zanden McMullen
2024–25	(Sweden) Edvin Anger (2)	(France) Mathis Desloges	(Norway) Oskar Opstad Vike
2025–26	(Norway) Lars Heggen	(Individual Neutral Athletes) Savelii Korostelev	(Italy) Martino Carollo

=== Women ===
Season	Winner	Runner-up	Third
2014–15	(Sweden) Stina Nilsson	(Austria) Teresa Stadlober	(Switzerland) Nathalie von Siebenthal
2015–16	(Sweden) Stina Nilsson (2)	(Switzerland) Nathalie von Siebenthal	(Austria) Teresa Stadlober
2016–17	(Slovenia) Anamarija Lampič	(Russia) Yuliya Belorukova	(Switzerland) Nadine Fähndrich
2017–18	(Russia) Natalya Nepryayeva	(Russia) Anastasia Sedova	(Sweden) Ebba Andersson
2018–19	(Sweden) Ebba Andersson	(Norway) Tiril Udnes Weng	(Russia) Mariya Istomina
2019–20	(Sweden) Ebba Andersson (2)	(Sweden) Linn Svahn	(Sweden) Frida Karlsson
2020–21	(Sweden) Linn Svahn	(Norway) Helene Marie Fossesholm	(Sweden) Frida Karlsson (2)
2021–22	(Sweden) Frida Karlsson	(Norway) Helene Marie Fossesholm (2)	(Norway) Kristine Stavås Skistad
2022–23	(Latvia) Patrīcija Eiduka	(Norway) Margrethe Bergane	(Norway) Maria Hartz Melling
2023–24	(Norway) Margrethe Bergane	(Switzerland) Nadja Kälin	(Switzerland) Anja Weber
2024–25	(Germany) Helen Hoffmann	(Canada) Liliane Gagnon	(Sweden) Märta Rosenberg
2025–26	(Canada) Alison Mackie	(Italy) Iris De Martin Pinter	(Andorra) Gina Del Rio

Rank	Nation	Gold	Silver	Bronze	Total
1	Sweden	8	3	6	17
2	Norway	5	5	4	14
3	Russia	2	6	4	12
4	Italy	2	2	1	5
5	France	2	1	2	5
6	United States	1	1	1	3
7	Germany	1	1		2
8	Canada	1	1		2
9	Slovenia	1			1
10	Latvia	1			1
11	Switzerland		2	3	5
12	Austria		1	1	2
13	Individual Neutral Athletes		1		1
14	Finland			1	1
15	Andorra			1	1

== Nations Cup ==
All results of female and male athletes of a nation are counted for the Nations Cup.

Season	Winner	Runner-up	Third	Men's winner	Women's winner
1981–82	Norway	Czechoslovakia	Sweden	Norway	Norway
1982–83	Norway	Soviet Union	Finland	Norway	Norway
1983–84	Norway	Soviet Union	Sweden	Norway	Norway
1984–85	Norway	Sweden	Soviet Union	Norway	Norway
1985–86	Norway	Sweden	Soviet Union	Sweden	Norway
1986–87	Sweden	Norway	Soviet Union (3)	Sweden	Norway
1987–88	Sweden (2)	Soviet Union (3)	Norway	Sweden	Soviet Union
1988–89	Soviet Union	Sweden	Norway (2)	Sweden	Soviet Union
1989–90	Soviet Union	Norway	Sweden	Norway	Soviet Union
1990–91	Soviet Union (3)	Norway	Sweden	Norway	Soviet Union (4)
1991–92	Norway	CIS	Italy	Norway	CIS
1992–93	Norway	Russia	Italy	Norway	Russia
1993–94	Norway	Russia	Italy	Norway	Russia
1994–95	Russia	Norway	Italy	Norway	Russia
1995–96	Russia	Norway	Italy	Norway	Russia
1996–97	Norway	Russia	Italy	Norway	Russia
1997–98	Norway	Russia	Italy	Norway	Russia
1998–99	Norway	Russia	Sweden	Norway	Russia
1999–00	Norway	Russia	Italy	Norway	Russia
2000–01	Norway	Russia	Italy	Norway	Russia (9)
2001–02	Norway	Russia	Italy	Norway	Norway
2002–03	Norway	Germany	Sweden	Sweden (5)	Norway
2003–04	Norway	Germany	Italy	Norway	Norway
2004–05	Norway	Germany	Russia	Norway	Norway
2005–06	Norway	Sweden	Germany	Norway	Norway
2006–07	Norway	Germany (4)	Finland	Norway	Finland
2007–08	Norway	Finland	Germany (2)	Norway	Norway
2008–09	Norway	Finland (2)	Italy (12)	Norway	Finland (2)
2009–10	Norway	Russia	Sweden	Norway	Norway
2010–11	Norway	Sweden	Russia	Norway	Norway
2011–12	Norway	Russia	Sweden	Russia	Norway
2012–13	Norway	Russia	Sweden	Russia	Norway
2013–14	Norway	Russia	Sweden	Norway	Norway
2014–15	Norway	Russia	Sweden	Norway	Norway
2015–16	Norway	Russia	Finland	Norway	Norway
2016–17	Norway	Sweden	Finland	Norway	Norway
2017–18	Norway	Sweden	Russia	Norway	Norway
2018–19	Norway	Russia	Sweden	Norway	Norway
2019–20	Norway	Russia (16)	Sweden	Norway	Norway
2020–21	Russia (3)	Norway (6)	Sweden (14)	Russia (3)	Sweden
2021–22	Norway	Sweden	Russia (4)	Norway	Sweden
2022–23	Norway	Sweden	Finland	Norway	Norway
2023–24	Norway	Sweden	Finland	Norway	Sweden
2024–25	Norway	Sweden	Finland	Norway	Norway (25)
2025–26	Norway (37)	Sweden (12)	Finland (8)	Norway (37)	Sweden (4)

Rank	Nation	Gold	Silver	Bronze	Men's winner	Women's winner
1	Norway	37	6	2	37	25
2	Russia	3	16	4	3	9
3	Soviet Union	3	3	3		4
4	Sweden	2	12	14	5	4
5	Germany		4	2		
6	Finland		2	8		2
7	Czech Republic		1			
8	Italy			12		

== World Cup title winners ==
=== Overall titles ===
==== Men ====
Skier	Titles	Runner-up	Third	Winning Years
(Norway) Bjørn Dæhlie	6	2	2	1992, 1993, 1995, 1996, 1997, 1999
(Norway) Johannes Høsflot Klæbo	6	2	1	2018, 2019, 2022, 2023, 2025, 2026
(Sweden) Gunde Svan	5	2	1	1984, 1985, 1986, 1988, 1989
(Switzerland) Dario Cologna	4	1	1	2009, 2011, 2012, 2015
(Norway) Martin Johnsrud Sundby	3	0	1	2014, 2016, 2017
(Norway) Petter Northug	2	4	1	2010, 2013
(Soviet Union) (Kazakhstan) Vladimir Smirnov	2	3	3	1991, 1994
(Russia) Alexander Bolshunov	2	2	0	2020, 2021
(Sweden) Per Elofsson	2	0	0	2001, 2002
(Germany) Tobias Angerer	2	0	0	2006, 2007
(Sweden) Torgny Mogren	1	3	1	1987
(Norway) Vegard Ulvang	1	2	1	1990
(Germany) René Sommerfeldt	1	2	0	2004
(Norway) Thomas Alsgaard	1	1	1	1998
(Spain) Johann Mühlegg	1	1	0	2000
(Sweden) Mathias Fredriksson	1	1	0	2003
(Czech Republic) Lukáš Bauer	1	1	0	2008
(Norway) Harald Østberg Amundsen	1	1	0	2024
(United States) Bill Koch	1	0	1	1982
(Soviet Union) Alexander Zavyalov	1	0	0	1983
(Germany) Axel Teichmann	1	0	0	2005

==== Women ====
Skier	Titles	Runner-up	Third	Winning Years
(Soviet Union) (Russia) Yelena Välbe	5	3	1	1989, 1991, 1992, 1995, 1997
(Norway) Marit Bjørgen	4	5	0	2005, 2006, 2012, 2015
(United States) Jessie Diggins	4	3	0	2021, 2024, 2025, 2026
(Norway) Bente Skari	4	2	0	1999, 2000, 2002, 2003
(Poland) Justyna Kowalczyk	4	1	1	2009, 2010, 2011, 2013
(Norway) Therese Johaug	3	2	2	2014, 2016, 2020
(Finland) Marjo Matikainen	3	0	0	1986, 1987, 1988
(Norway) Heidi Weng	2	1	2	2017, 2018
(Soviet Union) (Russia) Larisa Lazutina	2	0	4	1990, 1998
(Finland) Marja-Liisa Kirvesniemi	2	0	1	1983, 1984
(Finland) Virpi Kuitunen	2	0	1	2007, 2008
(Italy) Manuela Di Centa	2	0	0	1994, 1996
(Soviet Union) Lyubov Yegorova	1	1	2	1993
(Norway) Ingvild Flugstad Østberg	1	1	2	2019
(Russia) Natalya Nepryayeva	1	1	1	2022
(Russia) Yuliya Chepalova	1	0	1	2001
(Italy) Gabriella Paruzzi	1	0	1	2004
(Norway) Berit Aunli	1	0	0	1982
(Norway) Anette Bøe	1	0	0	1985
(Norway) Tiril Udnes Weng	1	0	0	2023

=== Sprint titles ===
==== Men ====
Skier	Titles	Runner-up	Third	Winning Years
(Norway) Johannes Høsflot Klæbo	8	1	0	2017, 2018, 2019, 2020, 2023, 2024, 2025, 2026
(Sweden) Emil Jönsson	3	1	1	2010, 2011, 2013
(Norway) Ola Vigen Hattestad	3	1	0	2008, 2009, 2014
(Italy) Federico Pellegrino	2	3	2	2016, 2021
(Norway) Bjørn Dæhlie	2	1	0	1997, 1999
(Sweden) Thobias Fredriksson	2	1	0	2003, 2004
(Norway) Jens Arne Svartedal	1	2	0	2007
(Norway) Tor Arne Hetland	1	1	3	2005
(Norway) Trond Iversen	1	1	1	2002
(Norway) Finn Hågen Krogh	1	0	1	2015
(Norway) Thomas Alsgaard	1	0	0	1998
(Norway) Morten Brørs	1	0	0	2000
(Norway) Jan Jacob Verdenius	1	0	0	2001
(Sweden) Björn Lind	1	0	0	2006
(Sweden) Teodor Peterson	1	0	0	2012
(France) Richard Jouve	1	0	0	2022

==== Women ====
Skier	Titles	Runner-up	Third	Winning Years
(Norway) Marit Bjørgen	5	1	2	2003, 2004, 2005, 2006, 2015
(Norway) Bente Skari	5	1	0	1998, 1999, 2000, 2001, 2002
(Norway) Maiken Caspersen Falla	3	2	1	2016, 2017, 2018
(Slovenia) Petra Majdič	3	1	1	2008, 2009, 2011
(Sweden) Maja Dahlqvist	3	0	2	2022, 2023, 2026
(United States) Kikkan Randall	3	0	1	2012, 2013, 2014
(Sweden) Linn Svahn	2	0	1	2020, 2024
(Sweden) Stina Nilsson	1	2	1	2019
(Finland) Virpi Kuitunen	1	1	1	2007
(Slovenia) Anamarija Lampič	1	1	1	2021
(Poland) Justyna Kowalczyk	1	1	0	2010
(Italy) Stefania Belmondo	1	0	1	1997
(Finland) Jasmi Joensuu	1	0	0	2025

=== Distance titles ===
==== Men ====
Skier	Titles	Runner-up	Third	Winning Years
(Switzerland) Dario Cologna	4	2	0	2011, 2012, 2015, 2018
(Norway) Martin Johnsrud Sundby	3	2	1	2014, 2016, 2017
(Russia) Alexander Bolshunov	3	1	0	2019, 2020, 2021
(Germany) Tobias Angerer	2	0	1	2006, 2007
(Norway) Johannes Høsflot Klæbo	1	2	1	2026
(Czech Republic) Lukáš Bauer	1	1	1	2008
(Russia) Alexander Legkov	1	1	1	2013
(Spain) Johann Mühlegg	1	1	0	2000^{[a]}
(Italy) Pietro Piller Cottrer	1	1	0	2009
(Norway) Harald Østberg Amundsen	1	1	0	2024
(Finland) Mika Myllylä	1	0	2	1997^{[a]}
(Norway) Petter Northug	1	0	2	2010
(Austria) Mikhail Botvinov	1	0	1	1999^{[a]}
(Germany) René Sommerfeldt	1	0	1	2004
(Finland) Iivo Niskanen	1	0	1	2022
(Norway) Pål Golberg	1	0	1	2023
(Norway) Simen Hegstad Krueger	1	0	1	2025
(Norway) Thomas Alsgaard	1	0	0	1998^{[a]}
(Finland) Jari Isometsä	1	0	0	2000^{[b]}
(Germany) Axel Teichmann	1	0	0	2005

a. ^{1} ^{2} ^{3} ^{4} Long Distance World Cup
b. ^{1} Middle Distance World Cup

==== Women ====
Skier	Titles	Runner-up	Third	Winning Years
(Norway) Therese Johaug	5	2	2	2014, 2016, 2019, 2020, 2022
(Poland) Justyna Kowalczyk	4	1	1	2009, 2010, 2011, 2013
(United States) Jessie Diggins	4	1	1	2021, 2024, 2025, 2026
(Norway) Marit Bjørgen	3	4	0	2005, 2012, 2015
(Norway) Heidi Weng	2	2	2	2017, 2018
(Estonia) Kristina Šmigun	2	1	2	1999^{[a]}, 2000^{[b]}
(Russia) Larisa Lazutina	2	0	2	1998^{[a]}, 2000^{[a]}
(Finland) Virpi Kuitunen	2	0	0	2007, 2008
(Ukraine) Valentyna Shevchenko	1	1	0	2004
(Finland) Kerttu Niskanen	1	0	1	2023
(Russia) Yelena Välbe	1	0	0	1997^{[a]}
(Russia) Yuliya Chepalova	1	0	0	2006

a. ^{1} ^{2} ^{3} ^{4} Long Distance World Cup
b. ^{1} Middle Distance World Cup

== Most World Cup wins ==
As of 26 March 2026

Active athletes
Active athletes who haven't competed in the current season's World Cup competitions

=== Most successful race winners ===
==== Men ====
Rank	Skier	World Cup Seasons	World Cup				Stage World Cup (Nordic Opening, Tour de Ski, Ski Tour 2020, WC Final, Ski Tour Canada)			Total wins
Rank	Skier	World Cup Seasons	Wins	Distance	Sprint	Stage events	Wins	Distance	Sprint	Total wins
1	(Norway) Johannes Høsflot Klæbo	2016–active	79	22	47	10	34	16	18	113
2	(Norway) Bjørn Dæhlie	1989–1999	46	45	1	–	–	–	–	46
3	(Norway) Petter Northug	2005–2017	20	8	6	6	18	15	3	38
4	(Sweden) Gunde Svan	1982–1991	30	30	–	–	–	–	–	30
	(Soviet Union) (Kazakhstan) Vladimir Smirnov	1983–1998	30	30	–	–	–	–	–	30
	(Norway) Martin Johnsrud Sundby	2005–2020	19	11	–	8	11	11	–	30
7	(Russia) Alexander Bolshunov	2017–active	20	16	1	3	8	8	–	28
8	(Switzerland) Dario Cologna	2007–2022	15	7	2	6	11	11	–	26
9	(Czech Republic) Lukáš Bauer	1997–2016	11	9	–	2	7	7	–	18
	(Italy) Federico Pellegrino	2010–2026	13	–	13	–	5	–	5	18
11	(Sweden) Emil Jönsson	2004–2018	13	–	13	–	3	–	3	16
12	(Russia) Sergey Ustiugov	2013–active	4	1	2	1	11	8	3	15
13	(Sweden) Torgny Mogren	1984–1998	13	13	–	–	–	–	–	13
	(Norway) Thomas Alsgaard	1993–2003	13	11	2	–	–	–	–	13
	(Norway) Ola Vigen Hattestad	2003–2017	13	–	13	–	–	–	–	13
	(Norway) Tor Arne Hetland	1995–2009	11	2	9	–	2	–	2	13
	(Germany) Axel Teichmann	1999–2014	8	8	–	–	5	5	–	13
	(Norway) Pål Golberg	2010–2025	11	7	3	1	2	1	1	13
19	(Norway) Jens Arne Svartedal	1998–2010	12	1	11	–	–	–	–	12
	(Norway) Harald Østberg Amundsen	2018–active	8	7	–	1	4	4	–	12

==== Women ====
Rank	Skier	World Cup Seasons	World Cup				Stage World Cup (Nordic Opening, Tour de Ski, Ski Tour 2020, WC Final, Ski Tour Canada)			Total wins
Rank	Skier	World Cup Seasons	Wins	Distance	Sprint	Stage events	Wins	Distance	Sprint	Total wins
1	(Norway) Marit Bjørgen	2000–2015, 2017–2018	84	41	31	12	30	21	9	114
2	(Norway) Therese Johaug	2007–2016, 2019–2022, 2025	50	38	–	11	39	38	1	89
3	(Poland) Justyna Kowalczyk	2002–2018	31	19	7	5	19	14	5	50
4	(Soviet Union) (Russia) Yelena Välbe	1987–1998	45	44	1	–	–	–	–	45
5	(Norway) Bente Skari	1992–2003	42	25	17	–	–	–	–	42
6	(United States) Jessie Diggins	2011–2026	18	14	1	3	13	11	2	31
7	(Finland) Virpi Kuitunen	1995–2010	20	11	7	2	7	5	2	27
8	(Slovenia) Petra Majdič	1999–2011	16	1	15	–	8	2	6	24
9	(Italy) Stefania Belmondo	1989–2002	23	23	–	–	–	–	–	23
	(Sweden) Stina Nilsson	2012–2020	12	–	11	1	11	4	7	23
11	(Norway) Maiken Caspersen Falla	2009–2022	16	–	16	–	6	–	6	22
12	(Soviet Union) (Russia) Larisa Lazutina	1984–2002	21	21	–	–	–	–	–	21
13	(Sweden) Linn Svahn	2019–active	13	2	11	–	7	2	5	20
14	(Czech Republic) Kateřina Neumannová	1991–2007	18	16	2	–	1	1	–	19
15	(Russia) Yuliya Chepalova	1996–2009	18	17	1	–	–	–	–	18
	(Sweden) Jonna Sundling	2015–active	17	3	14	–	1	–	1	18
17	(Norway) Ingvild Flugstad Østberg	2008–2020, 2022–2023	5	2	2	1	12	11	1	17
18	(Estonia) Kristina Šmigun	1993–2010	16	14	2	–	–	–	–	16
	(Sweden) Frida Karlsson	2019–active	14	13	–	1	2	2	–	16
20	(Italy) Manuela Di Centa	1982–1998	15	15	–	–	–	–	–	15

- With 84 victories in World Cup and total 114 including Stage World Cup wins Marit Bjørgen is record-holder among both men and women.

=== World Cup wins by nation ===
The table below lists those nations which have won at least one individual World Cup race. (Note: Team events (relays and team sprints) are not included in the table due to lack of appropriate sources for many relay races prior to 1995/96 World Cup season.)

As of 22 March 2026

Countries no longer exist

Rank	Nation	Total wins			Wins by disciplines					
Rank	Nation	Total wins			Men			Women		
Rank	Nation	Men	Women	All	DI	SP	SE	DI	SP	SE
1	Norway	466	385	851	269	170	27	256	102	27
2	Sweden	134	132	266	95	39	–	53	75	4
3	Russia	94	100	194	68	20	6	88	11	1
4	Finland	39	79	118	38	1	–	62	15	2
5	Italy	46	52	98	19	27	–	45	7	–
6	United States	9	49	58	8	1	–	28	18	3
7	Poland	1	50	51	–	1	–	35	10	5
8	Soviet Union (6 RUS / 1 KAZ / 1 LTU)	17	31	48	17	–	–	31	–	–
9	Germany	36	10	46	32	3	1	8	2	–
10	Czech Republic	18	19	37	16	–	2	17	2	–
10	Switzerland	28	9	37	19	3	6	1	8	–
12	Kazakhstan	34	–	34	33	1	–	–	–	–
13	France	31	1	32	21	10	–	1	–	–
14	Slovenia	–	29	29	–	–	–	4	25	–
15	Estonia	6	16	22	6	–	–	14	2	–
16	Canada	15	6	21	11	4	–	3	3	–
17	Czechoslovakia (2 CZE / 1 SVK)	–	10	10	–	–	–	10	–	–
18	Spain	7	–	7	7	–	–	–	–	–
19	Ukraine	–	5	5	–	–	–	5	–	–
20	Austria	4	–	4	4	–	–	–	–	–
	Slovakia	1	3	4	1	–	–	2	1	–
22	East Germany	–	3	3	–	–	–	3	–	–
23	Belarus	1	–	1	1	–	–	–	–	–
Total		984	986	1970	663	279	42	664	280	42

== Most World Cup podiums, top 10 results and individual starts ==
As of 22 March 2026

Active athletes
Active athletes who haven't competed in the current season's World Cup competitions

=== Men's career podiums ===
No.	Skier	1st	2nd	3rd	Total
1	(Norway) Johannes Høsflot Klæbo	113	21	8	142
2	(Norway) Petter Northug	38	29	17	84
3	(Norway) Bjørn Dæhlie	46	23	12	81
4	(Norway) Martin Johnsrud Sundby	30	26	18	74
5	(Switzerland) Dario Cologna	26	28	19	73
6	(Kazakhstan) Vladimir Smirnov	30	21	15	66
7	(Russia) Alexander Bolshunov	28	12	19	59
8	(Italy) Federico Pellegrino	18	22	10	50
9	(Sweden) Gunde Svan	30	11	5	46
9	(Russia) Sergey Ustiugov	15	19	12	46

=== Men's career top 10s ===
No.	Skier	Top 10
1	(Norway) Johannes Høsflot Klæbo	174
2	(Switzerland) Dario Cologna	164
3	(Norway) Petter Northug	145
4	(Norway) Martin Johnsrud Sundby	131
5	(Italy) Federico Pellegrino	123
6	(Canada) Alex Harvey	112
7	(Norway) Pål Golberg	108
8	(Norway) Bjørn Dæhlie	105
9	(Norway) Sjur Røthe	99
9	(Czech Republic) Lukáš Bauer	99

=== Men's individual starts ===
No.	Skier	Race	Tour	Starts
1	(Italy) Federico Pellegrino	311	32	343
2	(Italy) Giorgio Di Centa	322	20	342
3	(France) Jean-Marc Gaillard	300	34	334
4	(United Kingdom) Andrew Musgrave	293	28	321
5	(Canada) Devon Kershaw	290	29	319
6	(Switzerland) Dario Cologna	285	33	318
7	(France) Maurice Manificat	258	31	289
8	(Canada) Alex Harvey	258	29	287
9	(Germany) Tobias Angerer	260	17	277
10	(Sweden) Calle Halfvarsson	245	27	272

=== Women's career podiums ===
No.	Skier	1st	2nd	3rd	Total
1	(Norway) Marit Bjørgen	114	43	27	184
2	(Norway) Therese Johaug	89	38	33	160
3	(Norway) Heidi Weng	14	56	58	128
4	(Poland) Justyna Kowalczyk	50	33	21	104
5	(Russia) Yelena Välbe	45	20	16	81
6	(United States) Jessie Diggins	31	16	32	79
7	(Norway) Ingvild Flugstad Østberg	17	25	31	73
8	(Italy) Stefania Belmondo	23	26	17	66
9	(Russia) Larisa Lazutina	21	19	22	62
10	(Norway) Bente Skari	42	13	5	60

=== Women's career top 10s ===
No.	Skier	Top 10
1	(Norway) Marit Bjørgen	249
2	(Norway) Heidi Weng	242
3	(United States) Jessie Diggins	211
4	(Norway) Therese Johaug	209
5	(Poland) Justyna Kowalczyk	199
6	(Finland) Krista Pärmäkoski	197
7	(Sweden) Charlotte Kalla	175
8	(Norway) Ingvild Flugstad Østberg	171
9	(Norway) Astrid Uhrenholdt Jacobsen	153
10	(Finland) Kerttu Niskanen	147

=== Women's individual starts ===
No.	Skier	Race	Tour	Starts
1	(United States) Jessie Diggins	365	31	396
2	(Finland) Aino-Kaisa Saarinen	356	24	380
3	(Finland) Anne Kyllönen	341	32	373
3	(Finland) Kerttu Niskanen	339	34	373
5	(Germany) Stefanie Böhler	343	27	370
5	(Finland) Krista Pärmäkoski	335	35	370
7	(Norway) Heidi Weng	327	33	360
8	(Poland) Justyna Kowalczyk	319	23	342
9	(Norway) Marit Bjørgen	303	21	324
10	(Norway) Ingvild Flugstad Østberg	275	30	305

== Season records ==
As of 22 March 2026

=== Men ===
==== Victories per season ====
No.	Skier	Season	Wins
1	(Norway) Johannes Høsflot Klæbo	2023	20
2	(Norway) Johannes Høsflot Klæbo	2024	16
3	(Norway) Johannes Høsflot Klæbo	2026	15
4	(Norway) Martin Johnsrud Sundby	2016	14
	(Norway) Johannes Høsflot Klæbo	2025	14
6	(Norway) Johannes Høsflot Klæbo	2019	13
7	(Norway) Johannes Høsflot Klæbo	2018	11
8	(Norway) Johannes Høsflot Klæbo	2020	10
	(Russia) Alexander Bolshunov	2021	10
10	(Norway) Petter Northug	2010	9
	(Norway) Petter Northug	2013	9
	(Russia) Alexander Bolshunov	2020	9

==== Podiums per season ====
No.	Skier	Season	Top 3
1	(Norway) Johannes Høsflot Klæbo	2023	23
2	(Switzerland) Dario Cologna	2012	20
3	(Norway) Martin Johnsrud Sundby	2016	19
4	(Norway) Johannes Høsflot Klæbo	2024	18
5	(Russia) Alexander Bolshunov	2020	17
	(Norway) Johannes Høsflot Klæbo	2025	17
	(Norway) Johannes Høsflot Klæbo	2026	17
8	(Norway) Petter Northug	2010	16
	(Russia) Alexander Bolshunov	2021	16
10	(Norway) Johannes Høsflot Klæbo	2020	15

==== Most points per season ====
No.	Skier	Season	Points
1	(Norway) Johannes Høsflot Klæbo	2023	2715
2	(Norway) Harald Østberg Amundsen	2024	2654
3	(Norway) Martin Johnsrud Sundby	2016	2634
4	(Norway) Johannes Høsflot Klæbo	2024	2600
5	(Norway) Johannes Høsflot Klæbo	2026	2301
6	(Norway) Pål Golberg	2023	2243
7	(Russia) Alexander Bolshunov	2020	2221
8	(Switzerland) Dario Cologna	2012	2216
9	(Norway) Johannes Høsflot Klæbo	2025	2200
10	(Norway) Erik Valnes	2024	2106

==== Highest overall advantage ====
No.	Skier	Season	Points
1	(Norway) Martin Johnsrud Sundby	2016	1032
2	(Russia) Alexander Bolshunov	2021	965
3	(Switzerland) Dario Cologna	2012	750
4	(Czech Republic) Lukáš Bauer	2008	633
5	(Norway) Petter Northug	2010	600
6	(Germany) Tobias Angerer	2007	551
7	(Norway) Martin Johnsrud Sundby	2014	530
8	(Norway) Johannes Høsflot Klæbo	2022	497
9	(Russia) Alexander Bolshunov	2020	495
10	(Norway) Johannes Høsflot Klæbo	2023	472

=== Women ===
==== Victories per season ====
No.	Skier	Season	Wins
1	(Norway) Therese Johaug	2020	20
2	(Norway) Marit Bjørgen	2012	17
	(Norway) Therese Johaug	2016	17
4	(Norway) Marit Bjørgen	2015	15
5	(Norway) Bente Skari	2003	14
6	(Norway) Marit Bjørgen	2011	13
7	(Poland) Justyna Kowalczyk	2012	11
	(Poland) Justyna Kowalczyk	2013	11
	(Norway) Therese Johaug	2019	11
10	(Norway) Marit Bjørgen	2005	10
	(Finland) Virpi Kuitunen	2007	10

==== Podiums per season ====
No.	Skier	Season	Top 3
1	(Norway) Marit Bjørgen	2012	29
2	(Norway) Marit Bjørgen	2015	23
3	(Norway) Therese Johaug	2016	22
	(Norway) Therese Johaug	2020	22
5	(Poland) Justyna Kowalczyk	2012	21
	(Norway) Ingvild Flugstad Østberg	2016	21
	(Norway) Heidi Weng	2016	21
	(Norway) Heidi Weng	2017	21
9	(Poland) Justyna Kowalczyk	2011	19
10	(Poland) Justyna Kowalczyk	2010	18

==== Most points per season ====
No.	Skier	Season	Points
1	(United States) Jessie Diggins	2024	2746
2	(Norway) Marit Bjørgen	2012	2689
3	(Norway) Therese Johaug	2016	2681
4	(Sweden) Linn Svahn	2024	2571
5	(Norway) Therese Johaug	2020	2508
6	(Poland) Justyna Kowalczyk	2012	2419
7	(Sweden) Frida Karlsson	2024	2309
8	(United States) Jessie Diggins	2026	2303
9	(Norway) Ingvild Flugstad Østberg	2016	2302
10	(United States) Jessie Diggins	2025	2197

==== Highest overall advantage ====
No.	Skier	Season	Points
1	(Norway) Therese Johaug	2020	811
2	(Norway) Marit Bjørgen	2015	784
3	(Poland) Justyna Kowalczyk	2010	744
4	(Norway) Marit Bjørgen	2005	569
	(Finland) Virpi Kuitunen	2007	569
6	(Norway) Bente Skari	2003	558
7	(Poland) Justyna Kowalczyk	2013	514
8	(Poland) Justyna Kowalczyk	2011	495
9	(Norway) Heidi Weng	2017	414
10	(United States) Jessie Diggins	2026	381

== Consecutive victories and podiums ==
As of 8 March 2026

=== Men ===
==== Consecutive victories ====
No.	Skier	Season(s)	Wins
1	(Norway) Johannes Høsflot Klæbo	2024	7
2	(Norway) Johannes Høsflot Klæbo	2023	6
	(Norway) Johannes Høsflot Klæbo	2023	6
	(Norway) Johannes Høsflot Klæbo	2026	6
5	(Norway) Bjørn Dæhlie	1996	5
	(Russia) Sergey Ustiugov	2017	5
	(Russia) Alexander Bolshunov	2021	5
8	(Kazakhstan) Vladimir Smirnov	1994	4
	(Kazakhstan) Vladimir Smirnov	1995	4
	(Norway) Petter Northug	2009	4
	(Czech Republic) Lukáš Bauer	2010	4
	(Norway) Johannes Høsflot Klæbo	2018	4

==== Consecutive podiums ====
No.	Skier	Season(s)	Top 3
1	(Kazakhstan) Vladimir Smirnov	1995–1996	10
2	(Sweden) Gunde Svan	1985–1986	9
	(Norway) Bjørn Dæhlie	1995–1996	9
	(Russia) Alexander Bolshunov	2021	9
5	(Sweden) Gunde Svan	1984	8
	(Norway) Bjørn Dæhlie	1997–1998	8
	(Norway) Thomas Alsgaard	1998	8
8	(Norway) Johannes Høsflot Klæbo	2023–2024	7
	(Norway) Johannes Høsflot Klæbo	2024	7
10	(Norway) Bjørn Dæhlie	1994	6
	(Kazakhstan) Vladimir Smirnov	1996	6
	(Norway) Petter Northug	2009	6
	(Switzerland) Dario Cologna	2011	6
	(Russia) Sergey Ustiugov	2017	6
	(Russia) Alexander Bolshunov	2020	6
	(Norway) Johannes Høsflot Klæbo	2023	6
	(Norway) Johannes Høsflot Klæbo	2026	6

=== Women ===
==== Consecutive victories ====
No.	Skier	Season(s)	Wins
1	(Norway) Marit Bjørgen	2015	7
2	(Russia) Yelena Välbe	1995	6
	(Norway) Marit Bjørgen	2005–2006	6
	(Norway) Marit Bjørgen	2012–2013	6
5	(Italy) Manuela Di Centa	1996	5
	(Russia) Yelena Välbe	1997	5
	(Norway) Bente Martinsen	1999	5
	(Norway) Marit Bjørgen	2012	5
	(Norway) Therese Johaug	2016	5
	(Norway) Ingvild Flugstad Østberg	2019	5
	(Norway) Therese Johaug	2020	5
12	(Finland) Marja-Liisa Hämäläinen	1984	4
	(Soviet Union) (Commonwealth of Independent States) Yelena Välbe	1991–1992	4
	(Russia) Larisa Lazutina	1995	4
	(Norway) Bente Skari	2003	4
	(Norway) Marit Bjørgen	2010	4
	(Norway) Marit Bjørgen	2010–2011	4
	(Norway) Marit Bjørgen	2011–2012	4
	(Norway) Therese Johaug	2019	4
	(Norway) Therese Johaug	2020	4

==== Consecutive podiums ====
No.	Skier	Season(s)	Top 3
1	(Norway) Marit Bjørgen	2014–2015	14
2	(Russia) Yelena Välbe	1997	11
	(Norway) Ingvild Flugstad Østberg	2016	11
4	(Poland) Justyna Kowalczyk	2012	10
	(Norway) Marit Bjørgen	2015	10
6	(Soviet Union) (Commonwealth of Independent States) Yelena Välbe	1991–1992	8
	(Russia) Lyubov Yegorova	1993–1994	8
	(Russia) Larisa Lazutina	1995	8
	(Italy) Stefania Belmondo	1997	8
	(Norway) Heidi Weng	2015	8
	(Norway) Heidi Weng	2016–2017	8

== Youngest and oldest race winners ==
=== Men's youngest winners ===
No.	Skier	Born	Date	Location	Race	Level	Age
1	(Norway) Petter Northug	06.01.1986	08.03.2006	Falun, Sweden	10 km + 10 km C/F Pursuit	World Cup	20 years 61 days
2	(Norway) Johannes Høsflot Klæbo	22.10.1996	18.02.2017	Otepää, Estonia	1.4 km Sprint F	World Cup	20 years 119 days
3	(Norway) Lars Heggen	17.07.2005	17.01.2026	Oberhof, Germany	1.3 km F Sprint	World Cup	20 years 184 days
4	(Norway) Finn Hågen Krogh	06.09.1990	20.03.2011	Falun, Sweden	15 km Pursuit F	Stage World Cup	20 years 195 days
5	(Norway) Pål Gunnar Mikkelsplass	29.04.1961	09.01.1982	Reit im Winkl, West Germany	15 km Individual	World Cup	20 years 255 days
6	(Russia) Alexander Bolshunov	31.12.1996	04.03.2018	Lahti, Finland	15 km C Individual	World Cup	21 years 63 days
7	(Sweden) Gunde Svan	12.01.1962	19.03.1983	Anchorage, United States	15 km Individual	World Cup	21 years 66 days
8	(Russia) Mikhail Devyatyarov Jr.	11.11.1985	21.03.2007	Stockholm, Sweden	1.0 km Sprint C	World Cup	21 years 130 days
9	(Russia) Nikolay Morilov	11.08.1986	30.12.2007	Prague, Czech Republic	1.0 km Sprint F	Stage World Cup	21 years 141 days
10	(Germany) Janosch Brugger	06.06.1997	02.12.2018	Lillehammer, Norway	15 km C Pursuit	Stage World Cup	21 years 179 days

=== Women's youngest winners ===
No.	Skier	Born	Date	Location	Race	Level	Age
1	(East Germany) Gaby Nestler	16.02.1967	11.01.1986	Les Saisies, France	10 km F Individual	World Cup	18 years 329 days
2	(Finland) Pirjo Manninen	08.03.1981	17.12.2000	Brusson, Italy	1.4 km Sprint F	World Cup	19 years 284 days
3	(Czech Republic) Kateřina Neumannová	15.02.1973	12.12.1992	Ramsau, Austria	5 km Individual C	World Cup	19 years 300 days
4	(Sweden) Linn Svahn	09.12.1999	14.12.2019	Davos, Switzerland	1.5 km Sprint F	World Cup	20 years 5 days
5	(Norway) Brit Pettersen	24.11.1961	12.03.1982	Falun, Sweden	20 km Individual	World Cup	20 years 108 days
6	(East Germany) Simone Greiner-Petter	15.09.1967	15.01.1988	Toblach, Italy	20 km F Individual	World Cup	20 years 122 days
7	(Sweden) Hanna Falk	05.07.1989	05.12.2009	Düsseldorf, Germany	0.8 km Sprint F	World Cup	20 years 153 days
8	(Sweden) Charlotte Kalla	22.07.1987	06.01.2008	Nové Město, Czech Republic	10 km F Pursuit	Stage World Cup	20 years 168 days
9	(Norway) Therese Johaug	25.06.1988	04.01.2009	Val di Fiemme, Italy	9 km F Pursuit	Stage World Cup	20 years 193 days
10	(Sweden) Frida Karlsson	10.08.1999	07.03.2020	Oslo, Norway	30 km C Mass Start	World Cup	20 years 210 days

=== Men's oldest winners ===
No.	Skier	Born	Date	Location	Race	Level	Age
1	(Finland) Harri Kirvesniemi	10.05.1958	11.03.2000	Oslo, Norway	50 km C Individual	World Cup	41 years 306 days
2	(Italy) Giorgio Di Centa	07.10.1972	05.02.2010	Canmore, Canada	15 km F Individual	World Cup	37 years 121 days
3	(Italy) Maurilio De Zolt	25.09.1950	21.02.1987	Oberstdorf, West Germany	50 km C Individual	World Championships (Note: Until 1999 World Championships and 1994 Olympics, World Championship and Olympic races were included in the World Cup scoring system.)	36 years 149 days
4	(Czech Republic) Lukáš Bauer	18.08.1977	30.11.2013	Kuusamo, Finland	10 km C Individual	Stage World Cup	36 years 104 days
5	(Norway) Odd-Bjørn Hjelmeset	06.12.1971	05.01.2008	Val di Fiemme, Italy	20 km C Mass Start	Stage World Cup	36 years 30 days
6	(Norway) Erling Jevne	24.03.1966	15.12.2001	Davos, Switzerland	15 km C Individual	World Cup	35 years 266 days
7	(Italy) Federico Pellegrino	01.09.1990	21.03.2026	Lake Placid, United States	1.5 km Sprint F	World Cup	35 years 201 days
8	(Italy) Fulvio Valbusa	15.02.1969	06.02.2004	La Clusaz, France	15 km F Individual	World Cup	34 years 354 days
9	(Norway) Tor Arne Hetland	12.01.1974	29.12.2008	Prague, Czech Republic	1.3 km Sprint F	Stage World Cup	34 years 352 days
10	(Norway) Pål Golberg	16.07.1990	16.02.2025	Falun, Sweden	20 km F Mass Start	World Cup	34 years 212 days

=== Women's oldest winners ===
No.	Skier	Born	Date	Location	Race	Level	Age
1	(Norway) Hilde Gjermundshaug Pedersen	08.11.1964	07.01.2006	Otepää, Estonia	10 km C Individual	World Cup	41 years 60 days
2	(Norway) Marit Bjørgen	21.03.1980	18.03.2018	Falun, Sweden	World Cup Final Overall	World Cup	37 years 362 days
3	(Norway) Astrid Øyre Slind	09.02.1988	29.12.2025	Toblach, Italy	10 km C Individual	Stage World Cup	37 years 323 days
4	(Norway) Therese Johaug	25.06.1988	23.03.2025	Lahti, Finland	50 km C Mass Start	World Cup	36 years 271 days
5	(Finland) Marja-Liisa Kirvesniemi	10.09.1955	07.03.1992	Funäsdalen, Sweden	5 km C Individual	World Cup	36 years 179 days
6	(Russia) Larisa Lazutina	01.06.1965	18.03.2001	Falun, Sweden	10 km C Individual	World Cup	35 years 290 days
7	(Finland) Kerttu Niskanen	13.06.1988	16.03.2024	Falun, Sweden	10 km C Individual	World Cup	35 years 277 days
8	(Russia) Nina Gavrylyuk	13.04.1965	27.12.1999	Engelberg, Switzerland	Sprint C	World Cup	34 years 259 days
9	(Norway) Heidi Weng	20.07.1991	01.03.2026	Falun, Sweden	10 km + 10 km Skiathlon C/F	World Cup	34 years 224 days
10	(Italy) Gabriella Paruzzi	21.06.1969	25.01.2004	Val di Fiemme, Italy	70 km C Mass Start	World Cup	34 years 218 days

== Multi winners ==
=== Men's double winners ===
No.	Date	Location	Race	Level	Winners	
1	25.02.1982	Oslo, Norway	4 × 10 km Relay	World Championships	Norway Lars Erik Eriksen; Ove Aunli; Pål Gunnar Mikkelsplass; Oddvar Brå	Soviet Union Vladimir Nikitin; Oleksandr Batyuk; Yuriy Burlakov; Alexander Zavyalov
2	03.02.2007	Davos, Switzerland	15 km C Individual	World Cup	(France) Vincent Vittoz	(Switzerland) Toni Livers

=== Women's double winners ===
No.	Date	Location	Race	Level	Winners	
1	20.12.1994	Sappada, Italy	5 km F Individual	World Cup	(Russia) Nina Gavrylyuk	(Russia) Yelena Välbe
2	23.11.2002	Kiruna, Sweden	5 km F Individual	World Cup	(Estonia) Kristina Šmigun	(Germany) Evi Sachenbacher
3	12.02.2005	Reit im Winkl, Germany	10 km F Individual	World Cup	(Russia) Yevgeniya Medvedeva-Arbuzova	(Russia) Olga Zavyalova
4	27.01.2018	Seefeld, Austria	1.1 km Sprint F	World Cup	(United States) Sophie Caldwell	(Switzerland) Laurien van der Graaff

== World Cup all-time records ==
=== Men ===
Category	Season(s)		Record
Prize money in CHF (single season)	2016	(Norway) Martin Johnsrud Sundby	407,200
Overall points	2023	(Norway) Johannes Høsflot Klæbo	2715
Margin of victory	2016	(Norway) Martin Johnsrud Sundby	1032
Overall titles	1992–1999; 2018–2026	(Norway) Bjørn Dæhlie (Norway) Johannes Høsflot Klæbo	6
Consecutive overall titles	1984–1986; 1995–1997	(Sweden) Gunde Svan (Norway) Bjørn Dæhlie	3
Sprint titles	2017–2026	(Norway) Johannes Høsflot Klæbo	8
Distance titles	2011–2018	(Switzerland) Dario Cologna	4
All titles (excluding U23)	2017–2026	(Norway) Johannes Høsflot Klæbo	15
Victories (single season)	2023	(Norway) Johannes Høsflot Klæbo	20
Sprint victories (single season)	2023	(Norway) Johannes Høsflot Klæbo	10
Distance victories (single season)	2016	(Norway) Martin Johnsrud Sundby	11
Stage event victories (single season)	2014 & 2016	(Norway) Martin Johnsrud Sundby	3
Victories (within one calendar year)	2023	(Norway) Johannes Høsflot Klæbo	19
Sprint victories (within one calendar year)	2024	(Norway) Johannes Høsflot Klæbo	11
Distance victories (within one calendar year)	2023	(Norway) Johannes Høsflot Klæbo	9
Podiums (single season)	2023	(Norway) Johannes Høsflot Klæbo	23
Podiums (within one calendar year)	2023	(Norway) Johannes Høsflot Klæbo	22
Total victories	2017–2026	(Norway) Johannes Høsflot Klæbo	113
Sprint victories	2017–2026	(Norway) Johannes Høsflot Klæbo	65
Distance victories	1990–1999	(Norway) Bjørn Dæhlie	45
Tour de Ski victories	2019–2026	(Norway) Johannes Høsflot Klæbo	5
Stage event victories	2017–2026	(Norway) Johannes Høsflot Klæbo	10
Victories at one venue	2017–2025	(Norway) Johannes Høsflot Klæbo (Ruka/Kuusamo)	12
Sprint victories at one venue	2018–2026	(Norway) Johannes Høsflot Klæbo (Falun)	7
Distance victories at one venue	1989–1998	(Kazakhstan) Vladimir Smirnov (Lahti)	6
Total podiums	2016–2026	(Norway) Johannes Høsflot Klæbo	142
Sprint podiums	2017–2026	(Norway) Johannes Høsflot Klæbo	76
Distance podiums	1990–1999	(Norway) Bjørn Dæhlie	80
Stage event podiums	2009–2016; 2009–2018	(Norway) Petter Northug (Switzerland) Dario Cologna	13
Top 10 results	2016–2026	(Norway) Johannes Høsflot Klæbo	174
World Cup starts	1994–2017	(Italy) Giorgio Di Centa	322
Youngest race winner	2006	(Norway) Petter Northug	20 y, 61 d
Oldest race winner	2000	(Finland) Harri Kirvesniemi	41 y, 306 d
Time between the first and the last victory	1982–2000	(Finland) Harri Kirvesniemi	17 y, 358 d
Consecutive wins (all / participated races)	2024	(Norway) Johannes Høsflot Klæbo	7
Consecutive wins (sprint)	2024–2025	(Norway) Johannes Høsflot Klæbo	12
Consecutive wins (distance & stage events)	2021	(Russia) Alexander Bolshunov	6
Consecutive podiums (all races)	1995–1996	(Kazakhstan) Vladimir Smirnov	10

=== Women ===
Category	Season(s)		Record
Prize money in CHF (single season)	2016	(Norway) Therese Johaug	430,700
Overall points	2024	(United States) Jessie Diggins	2746
Margin of victory	2020	(Norway) Therese Johaug	811
Overall titles	1989–1997	(Russia) Yelena Välbe	5
Consecutive overall titles	1986–1988; 2009–2011	(Finland) Marjo Matikainen (Poland) Justyna Kowalczyk	3
Sprint titles	1998–2002; 2003–2015	(Norway) Bente Skari (consecutive) (Norway) Marit Bjørgen	5
Distance titles	2014–2022	(Norway) Therese Johaug	5
All titles (excluding U23)	2003–2015	(Norway) Marit Bjørgen	12
Victories (single season)	2020	(Norway) Therese Johaug	20
Sprint victories (single season)	2009; 2016	(Slovenia) Petra Majdič (Norway) Maiken Caspersen Falla	8
Distance victories (single season)	2020	(Norway) Therese Johaug	16
Stage event victories (single season)	2016 & 2020	(Norway) Therese Johaug	3
Victories (within one calendar year)	2012	(Norway) Marit Bjørgen	17
Sprint victories (within one calendar year)	2004	(Norway) Marit Bjørgen	9
Distance victories (within one calendar year)	2020	(Norway) Therese Johaug	12
Podiums (single season)	2012	(Norway) Marit Bjørgen	29
Podiums (within one calendar year)	2016	(Norway) Heidi Weng	28
Total victories	2003–2018	(Norway) Marit Bjørgen	114
Sprint victories	2003–2015	(Norway) Marit Bjørgen	40
Distance victories	2009–2025	(Norway) Therese Johaug	76
Tour de Ski victories	2010–2013; 2014–2025	(Poland) Justyna Kowalczyk (consecutive) (Norway) Therese Johaug	4
Stage event victories	2014–2017	(Norway) Marit Bjørgen	12
Victories at one venue	2006–2018	(Norway) Marit Bjørgen (Ruka/Kuusamo)	16
Sprint victories at one venue	2014–2022	(Norway) Maiken Caspersen Falla (Drammen)	6
Distance victories at one venue	2009–2025	(Norway) Therese Johaug (Val di Fiemme)	12
Total podiums	2003–2018	(Norway) Marit Bjørgen	184
Sprint podiums	2003–2018	(Norway) Marit Bjørgen	60
Distance podiums	2007–2025	(Norway) Therese Johaug	136
Stage event podiums	2009–2025	(Norway) Therese Johaug	22
Top 10 results	2003–2018	(Norway) Marit Bjørgen	249
World Cup starts	2011–2026	(United States) Jessie Diggins	365
Youngest race winner	1986	(East Germany) Gaby Nestler	18 y, 329 d
Oldest race winner	2006	(Norway) Hilde Gjermundshaug Pedersen	41 y, 60 d
Time between the first and the last victory	2009–2025	(Norway) Therese Johaug	16 y, 70 d
Consecutive wins (all races)	2015	(Norway) Marit Bjørgen	7
Consecutive wins (participated races)	2003	(Norway) Bente Skari	10
Consecutive wins (sprint)	2004–2005	(Norway) Marit Bjørgen	11
Consecutive wins (distance & stage events)	2020	(Norway) Therese Johaug	12
Consecutive podiums (all races)	2014–2015	(Norway) Marit Bjørgen	14

== World Cup scoring system ==
=== 1981/82 season to 2005/06 season ===
Seasons	Races	Place																													
Seasons	Races	1	2	3	4	5	6	7	8	9	10	11	12	13	14	15	16	17	18	19	20	21	22	23	24	25	26	27	28	29	30
1981/82–1984/85	Individual	26	22	19	17	16	15	14	13	12	11	10	9	8	7	6	5	4	3	2	1	points were not awarded									
1981/82–1984/85	Relay																					points were not awarded									
1985/86–1991/92	Individual	25	20	15	12	11	10	9	8	7	6	5	4	3	2	1	points were not awarded														
1985/86–1991/92	Relay																points were not awarded														
1992/93–2005/06	Individual	100	80	60	50	45	40	36	32	29	26	24	22	20	18	16	15	14	13	12	11	10	9	8	7	6	5	4	3	2	1
1992/93–2005/06	Team Sprint^{[a]}	100	80	60	50	45	40	36	32	29	26	24	22	20	18	16	15	14	13	12	11	10	9	8	7	6	5	4	3	2	1
1992/93–2005/06	Relay	200	160	120	100	90	80	72	64	58	52	48	44	40	36	32	30	28	26	24	22	20	18	16	14	12	10	8	6	4	2

a. ^{1} Team sprint discipline was first introduced in 1995/96 season.

=== 2006/07 season to 2021/22 ===
Races	Place																															
Races	1	2	3	4	5	6	7	8	9	10	11	12	13	14	15	16	17	18	19	20	21	22	23	24	25	26	27	28	29	30	31 - 40	>40
Individual	100	80	60	50	45	40	36	32	29	26	24	22	20	18	16	15	14	13	12	11	10	9	8	7	6	5	4	3	2	1		
Nordic Opening^{[a]}	200	160	120	100	90	80	72	64	58	52	48	44	40	36	32	30	28	26	24	22	20	18	16	14	12	10	8	6	4	2		
World Cup Final^{[b]}	200	160	120	100	90	80	72	64	58	52	48	44	40	36	32	30	28	26	24	22	20	18	16	14	12	10	8	6	4	2		
Relay (Nations Cup)	200	160	120	100	90	80	72	64	58	52	48	44	40	36	32	30	28	26	24	22	20	18	16	14	12	10	8	6	4	2		
Team Sprint (Nations Cup)	200	160	120	100	90	80	72	64	58	52	48	44	40	36	32	30	28	26	24	22	20	18	16	14	12	10	8	6	4	2		
Ski Tour 2020^{[c]}	300	240	180	150	135	120	108	96	87	78	72	66	60	54	48	45	42	39	36	33	30	27	24	21	18	15	12	9	6	3		
Tour de Ski^{[d]}	400	320	240	200	180	160	144	128	116	104	96	88	80	72	64	60	56	52	48	44	40	36	32	28	24	20	20	20	20	20	10	5
Ski Tour Canada^{[e]}	400	320	240	200	180	160	144	128	116	104	96	88	80	72	64	60	56	52	48	44	40	36	32	28	24	20	16	12	8	4		
Stage Nordic Opening^{[a]}	50	46	43	40	37	34	32	30	28	26	24	22	20	18	16	15	14	13	12	11	10	9	8	7	6	5	4	3	2	1		
Stage World Cup Final^{[b]}	50	46	43	40	37	34	32	30	28	26	24	22	20	18	16	15	14	13	12	11	10	9	8	7	6	5	4	3	2	1		
Stage Ski Tour 2020^{[c]}	50	46	43	40	37	34	32	30	28	26	24	22	20	18	16	15	14	13	12	11	10	9	8	7	6	5	4	3	2	1		
Stage Tour de Ski^{[d]}	50	46	43	40	37	34	32	30	28	26	24	22	20	18	16	15	14	13	12	11	10	9	8	7	6	5	4	3	2	1		
Stage Ski Tour Canada^{[e]}	50	46	43	40	37	34	32	30	28	26	24	22	20	18	16	15	14	13	12	11	10	9	8	7	6	5	4	3	2	1		
Relay (Individual)^{[f]}	25	20	15	12	11	10	9	8	7	6	5	4	3	2	1	points were not awarded																
Team Sprint (Individual)	25	20	15	12	11	10	9	8	7	6	5	4	3	2	1	points were not awarded																
Bonus points	15	12	10	8	6	5	4	3	2	1	points were not awarded																					

=== since 2022/2023 season ===
Place	1	2	3	4	5	6	7	8	9	10	11	12	13	14	15	16	17	18	19	20	21	22	23	24	25	26	27	28	29	30	31	32	33	34	35	36	37	38	39	40	41	42	43	44	45	46	47	48	49	50
Individual	100	95	90	85	80	75	72	69	66	63	60	58	56	54	52	50	48	46	44	42	40	38	36	34	32	30	28	26	24	22	20	19	18	17	16	15	14	13	12	11	10	9	8	7	6	5	4	3	2	1
Relay (Nations Cup)	200	160	120	100	90	80	72	64	58	52	48	44	40	36	32	30	28	26	24	22	20	18	16	14	12	10	8	6	4	2	points were not awarded
Team Sprint (Nations Cup)	200	160	120	100	90	80	72	64	58	52	48	44	40	36	32	30	28	26	24	22	20	18	16	14	12	10	8	6	4	2	points were not awarded
Tour de Ski	300	285	270	255	240	225	216	207	198	189	180	174	168	162	156	150	144	138	132	126	120	114	108	102	96	90	84	78	72	66	60	57	54	51	48	45	42	39	36	33	30	27	24	21	18	15	12	9	6	3
Stage Tour de Ski	50	47	44	41	38	35	32	30	28	26	24	22	20	18	16	15	14	13	12	11	10	9	8	7	6	5	4	3	2	1	points were not awarded
Bonus points (Mass Start checkpoints)	15	12	10	8	6	5	4	3	2	1	points were not awarded
Sprint Qualifications	15	12	10	8	6	5	4	3	2	1	points were not awarded

a. ^{1} ^{2} Nordic Opening is held annually since 2010/11 season.
b. ^{1} ^{2} World Cup Final is held since 2007/08 season, except 2014/15, 2015/16 and 2019/20 seasons. The stages of its first edition were not counted as a Stage World Cup race, hence no World Cup points were awarded.
c. ^{1} ^{2} Ski Tour 2020 was held only in 2019/20 season.
d. ^{1} ^{2} Tour de Ski is held annually since 2006/07 season. World Cup points were not awarded for the stage races in its first edition.
e. ^{1} ^{2} Ski Tour Canada was held only in 2015/16 season.
f. ^{1} Individual World Cup points for places in Relays and Team Sprints were given only in 2020/21 season.

== Timeline calendar ==
Season	Men				Men's Team			Women				Women's Team			Mixed Team		
Season	DI	SP	ST	Total	RL	TS	Total	DI	SP	ST	Total	RL	TS	Total	MR	MTS	Total
1981–82	10	–	–	10	1	–	1	10	–	–	10	1	–	1	–	–	–
1982–83	10	–	–	10	–	–	–	10	–	–	10	–	–	–	–	–	–
1983–84	10	–	–	10	4	–	4	10	–	–	10	4	–	4	–	–	–
1984–85	10	–	–	10	5	–	5	11	–	–	11	5	–	5	–	–	–
1985–86	9	–	–	9	5	–	5	9	–	–	9	5	–	5	–	–	–
1986–87	11	–	–	11	6	–	6	11	–	–	11	6	–	6	–	–	–
1987–88	11	–	–	11	6	–	6	10	–	–	10	6	–	6	–	–	–
1988–89	12	–	–	12	5	–	5	12	–	–	12	5	–	5	–	–	–
1989–90	11	–	–	11	5	–	5	11	–	–	11	6	–	6	–	–	–
1990–91	12	–	–	12	5	–	5	12	–	–	12	5	–	5	–	–	–
1991–92	12	–	–	12	5	–	5	12	–	–	12	5	–	5	–	–	–
1992–93	13	–	–	13	6	–	6	12	–	–	12	6	–	6	–	–	–
1993–94	13	–	–	13	6	–	6	13	–	–	13	6	–	6	–	–	–
1994–95	15	–	–	15	6	–	6	15	–	–	15	6	–	6	–	–	–
1995–96	15	1	–	16	5	1	6	15	1	–	16	4	1	5	–	–	–
1996–97	14	1	–	15	5	1	6	14	1	–	15	6	1	7	–	–	–
1997–98	11	1	–	12	3	1	4	11	1	–	12	3	1	4	–	–	–
1998–99	15	4	–	19	6	1	7	15	4	–	19	6	1	7	–	–	–
1999–00	15	6	–	21	5	1	6	15	6	–	21	5	1	6	–	–	–
2000–01	13	7	–	20	3	1	4	13	7	–	20	3	1	4	–	–	–
2001–02	13	7	–	20	3	2	5	13	7	–	20	3	2	5	–	–	–
2002–03	13	8	–	21	4	2	6	13	8	–	21	4	2	6	1	–	1
2003–04	17	8	–	25	5	4	9	17	8	–	25	5	4	9	–	–	–
2004–05	12	8	–	20	3	4	7	12	8	–	20	3	4	7	–	–	–
2005–06	15	9	–	24	2	3	5	15	9	–	24	2	3	5	–	–	–
2006–07	15	10	1	26	4	1	5	15	10	1	26	4	1	5	–	–	–
2007–08	20	11	1	32	3	2	5	20	11	1	32	3	2	5	–	–	–
2008–09	18	12	2	32	2	2	4	18	12	2	32	2	2	4	–	–	–
2009–10	18	12	2	32	2	2	4	18	12	2	32	2	2	4	–	–	–
2010–11	18	11	3	32	3	2	5	18	11	3	32	3	2	5	–	–	–
2011–12	22	13	3	38	2	2	4	22	13	3	38	2	2	4	–	–	–
2012–13	19	10	3	32	2	3	5	19	10	3	32	2	3	5	–	–	–
2013–14	15	11	3	29	1	2	3	15	11	3	29	1	2	3	–	–	–
2014–15	16	10	2	28	–	1	1	16	10	2	28	–	1	1	–	–	–
2015–16	21	12	3	36	2	1	3	21	12	3	36	2	1	3	–	–	–
2016–17	18	10	3	31	2	2	4	18	10	3	31	2	2	4	–	–	–
2017–18	17	10	3	30	–	1	1	17	10	3	30	–	1	1	–	–	–
2018–19	17	12	3	32	2	2	4	17	12	3	32	2	2	4	–	–	–
2019–20	19	11	3	33	2	2	4	19	11	3	33	2	2	4	–	–	–
2020–21	14	7	2	23	1	2	3	14	7	2	23	1	2	3	–	–	–
2021–22	11	9	1	21	1	1	2	11	9	1	21	1	1	2	1	1	2
2022–23	17	13	1	31	1	2	3	17	13	1	31	1	2	3	2	–	2
2023–24	20	13	1	34	2	1	3	20	13	1	34	2	1	3	1	–	1
2024–25	19	11	1	31	–	3	3	19	11	1	31	–	3	3	1	–	1
2025–26	16	11	1	28	–	2	2	16	11	1	28	–	2	2	–	–	–
Total events	662	279	42	983	141	57	198	661	279	42	982	142	57	199	6	1	7
Double wins	1	–	–	1	1	–	1	3	1	–	4	–	–	–	–	–	–
Total winners	663	279	42	984	142	57	199	664	280	42	986	142	57	199	6	1	7

== World Cup hosts ==
Country	Place	Seasons																																													
Country	Place	'82	'83	'84	'85	'86	'87	'88	'89	'90	'91	'92	'93	'94	'95	'96	'97	'98	'99	'00	'01	'02	'03	'04	'05	'06	'07	'08	'09	'10	'11	'12	'13	'14	'15	'16	'17	'18	'19	'20	'21	'22	'23	'24	'25	'26	'27
Austria	Kitzbühel																		•																												
Austria	Linz																						•																								
Austria	Ramsau			•			•		•				•					•	•			•	•	•	•																						
Austria	Salzburg																					•																									
Austria	Seefeld				•											•			•																			•									
Austria	Tauplitzalm										•				•																																
Bulgaria	Vitosha				•																																										
Canada	Calgary						•	•		•																																					
Canada	Canmore																									•		•		•			•			•								•			
Canada	Gatineau																																			•											
Canada	Labrador City		•			•																																									
Canada	Montreal																																			•											
Canada	Quebec City																																•			•	•		•								
Canada	Silver Star											•																																			
Canada	Thunder Bay									•		•		•	•																																
Canada	Vernon																									•																					
Canada	Whistler																												•																		
China	Changchun																									•	•																				
China	Beijing																																														
Czech Republic^{[a]}	Liberec																											•			•		•														
Czech Republic^{[a]}	Nové Město				•	•			•						•	•			•	•	•	•	•	•	•	•		•	•			•		•		•				•							
Czech Republic^{[a]}	Prague																								•			•	•	•																	
Czechoslovakia	Stachy, Zadov		•																																												
Estonia	Otepää																		•		•		•	•	•	•	•	•	•	•	•	•			•		•		•								
Estonia	Tallinn																																										•		•		
Finland	Kuopio																				•	•																									
Finland	Kuusamo/Ruka																						•	•	•	•	•	•	•	•	•	•	•	•	•	•	•	•	•	•	•	•	•	•	•	•	•
Finland	Lahti	•	•	•	•	•	•		•	•	•	•	•	•	•	•	•	•	•	•		•	•	•	•		•	•	•	•	•	•	•	•	•	•		•	•	•	•	•	•	•	•	•	•
Finland	Muonio																		•																												
Finland	Rovaniemi							•																																							
Finland	Vantaa																		•																												
Finland	Vuokatti															•																															
France	Albertville											•																																			
France	Autrans			•																																											
France	La Bresse	•				•																																									
France	La Clusaz							•																•			•		•		•		•				•										
France	La Forclaz								•																																						
France	Lamoura-Mouthe																			•																											
France	Les Rousses																																										•		•		•
France	Les Saisies					•					•																																				
Germany	Dresden																																					•	•	•	•	•					
Germany	Düsseldorf																						•	•	•	•	•	•	•	•	•	•															
Germany	Furtwangen	•																																													
Germany	Garmisch-Partenkirchen																		•	•		•																									
Germany	Klingenthal	•	•		•	•			•		•																																				
Germany	Munich																										•																				
Germany	Oberhof																						•						•	•	•	•	•	•										•		•	
Germany	Oberstdorf					•	•										•							•		•	•				•	•			•	•	•	•	•	•		•	•				•
Germany	Reit im Winkl	•	•	•				•		•						•							•		•																						
Italy	Asiago																			•	•	•	•		•		•	•						•													
Italy	Bormio																			•								•																			
Italy	Brusson	•														•	•				•	•																									
Italy	Clusone																				•		•																								
Italy	Cogne/Val d'Aosta				•		•					•	•									•	•				•												•						•		
Italy	Cortina d'Ampezzo																													•	•	•	•	•	•												
Italy	Kastelruth	•						•																																							
Italy	Livigno																																										•				
Italy	Milan																	•	•													•															
Italy	Pragelato																							•	•																						
Italy	Santa Caterina													•		•					•																										
Italy	Sappada														•					•																											
Italy	Toblach							•						•					•					•						•	•	•	•	•	•	•	•	•	•	•	•		•	•	•	•	•
Italy	Val di Fiemme									•	•			•				•				•		•	•	•	•	•	•	•	•	•	•	•	•	•	•	•	•	•	•	•	•	•	•	•	•
Italy	Val di Sole				•		•		•																																						
Italy	Valdidentro																												•																		
Japan	Sapporo														•											•																					
Japan	Hakuba																•																														
Norway	Beitostølen																	•			•			•		•		•		•									•				•				
Norway	Drammen																						•	•	•	•	•	•		•		•	•	•	•	•	•	•	•			•	•	•		•	•
Norway	Konnerud																														•									•							
Norway	Lillehammer												•	•						•		•												•	•	•	•	•	•	•		•	•		•		
Norway	Meråker																																							•							
Norway	Oslo	•	•	•	•	•	•	•	•	•	•		•	•	•	•	•	•	•	•	•	•	•	•	•	•	•	•		•		•	•	•	•	•	•	•	•	•		•	•	•	•	•	•
Norway	Sjusjøen																															•															
Norway	Trondheim									•						•	•			•				•					•											•				•		•	•
Norway	Vang									•		•																																			
Poland	Szklarska Poręba																															•		•													
Russia^{[b]}	Kavgolovo		•	•		•	•	•	•			•	•	•		•	•	•			•		•																								
Russia^{[b]}	Moscow									•										•												•															
Russia^{[b]}	Rybinsk																										•	•	•	•	•	•				•											
Russia^{[b]}	Sochi																																•														
Russia^{[b]}	Tyumen																																														
Slovakia^{[a]}	Štrbské Pleso	•		•				•			•		•			•																															
Slovenia^{[c]}	Bohinj					•		•	•	•			•																																		
Slovenia^{[c]}	Planica																																			•		•		•							
Slovenia^{[c]}	Rogla																													•		•															
South Korea	Pyeongchang																																				•										
Soviet Union	Minsk										•																																				
Soviet Union	Murmansk			•																																											
Soviet Union	Saint Petersburg^{[d]}							•																																							
Soviet Union	Syktyvkar				•																																										
Sweden	Borlänge																				•		•			•																					
Sweden	Falun	•	•	•	•	•	•	•	•		•		•	•	•	•	•	•	•	•	•	•	•	•	•	•	•	•	•	•	•	•	•	•		•	•	•	•	•	•	•	•	•	•	•	
Sweden	Funäsdalen											•																																			
Sweden	Gothenburg																								•																						
Sweden	Gällivare															•									•		•		•		•		•											•			
Sweden	Kiruna	•													•		•			•			•																								
Sweden	Mora																									•																					
Sweden	Sollefteå									•																																					
Sweden	Stockholm																			•		•		•			•	•	•	•	•	•	•			•											
Sweden	Sunne																•																														
Sweden	Ulricehamn																																				•		•		•						•
Sweden	Umeå																							•																							
Sweden	Åre																																							•							
Sweden	Örnsköldsvik									•																																					
Sweden	Östersund														•																				•					•				•			
Switzerland	Bern																								•																						
Switzerland	Campra								•	•																																					
Switzerland	Davos		•		•		•	•	•		•			•		•	•	•	•	•	•	•	•	•		•	•	•	•	•	•	•	•	•	•	•	•	•	•	•	•	•	•	•	•	•	•
Switzerland	Engadin																																								•				•		•
Switzerland	Engelberg																		•	•	•																										
Switzerland	Goms																																											•		•	
Switzerland	Lenzerheide																																	•		•		•		•		•					
Switzerland	Le Brassus	•																																													
Switzerland	Pontresina									•																																					
Switzerland	Ulrichen												•							•																											
Switzerland	Val Müstair																																•		•		•		•		•		•				
United States	Anchorage		•																																												
United States	Biwabik					•																																									
United States	Fairbanks			•																																											
United States	Lake Placid																																													•	
United States	Minneapolis																																											•			
United States	Salt Lake City									•																																					
United States	Soldier Hollow																				•																										
Yugoslavia	Sarajevo		•	•																																											

a. ^{1} ^{2} As Czechoslovakia until 1992.
b. ^{1} As Soviet Union until 1991.
c. ^{1} As Yugoslavia until 1991.
d. ^{1} As Leningrad until 1991.

=== World Cup Finals ===
- 2007–08 – Bormio, Italy
- 2008–09 – Stockholm / Falun, Sweden
- 2009–10 – Stockholm / Falun, Sweden
- 2010–11 – Stockholm / Falun, Sweden
- 2011–12 – Stockholm / Falun, Sweden
- 2012–13 – Stockholm / Falun, Sweden
- 2013–14 – Falun, Sweden
- 2014–15 – not held
- 2015–16 – 2016 Ski Tour Canada
- 2016–17 – Quebec City, Canada
- 2017–18 – Falun, Sweden
- 2018–19 – Quebec City, Canada
- not held since 2019–20

== See also ==
- Tour de Ski
- FIS Nordic World Ski Championships
