= Morten Brørs =

Norwegian cross-country skier

Personal information
- Nationality: Norway
- Born: 28 July 1973 (age 52) Beitstad, Norway

Sport
- Sport: Skiing
- Club: Steinkjer SK

World Cup career
- Seasons: 8 – (1997–2004)
- Indiv. starts: 43
- Indiv. podiums: 3
- Indiv. wins: 2
- Team starts: 6
- Team podiums: 0
- Overall titles: 0 – (11th in 2000)
- Discipline titles: 1 – (1 SP: 2000)

Morten Brørs (born 28 July 1973 in Beitstad) is a Norwegian cross-country skier who competed from 1995 to 2004. He earned two World Cup victories, both in sprint events (1999, 2001). His club was Steinkjer SK.

== Cross-country skiing results ==
All results are sourced from the International Ski Federation (FIS).

=== World Cup ===
==== Season titles ====
- 1 title – (1 sprint)

Season
Season	Discipline
2000	Sprint

==== Season standings ====
Season	Age					
Season	Age	Overall	Distance	Long Distance	Middle Distance	Sprint
1997	23	NC	—N/a	NC	—N/a	—
1998	24	NC	—N/a	NC	—N/a	—
1999	25	89	—N/a	NC	—N/a	32
2000	26	11	—N/a	71	NC	1st place, gold medalist(s)
2001	27	21	—N/a	—N/a	—N/a	4
2002	28	39	—N/a	—N/a	—N/a	12
2003	29	105	—N/a	—N/a	—N/a	52
2004	30	NC	NC	—N/a	—N/a	—

==== Individual podiums ====
- 2 victories
- 3 podiums

No.	Season	Date	Location	Race	Level	Place
1	1999–00	29 December 1999	Kitzbühel, Austria	1.0 km Sprint F	World Cup	1st
2	1999–00	3 March 2000	Lahti, Finland	1.0 km Sprint F	World Cup	2nd
3	2000–01	4 February 2001	Nové Město, Czech Republic	1.0 km Sprint F	World Cup	1st
