= 1994–95 FIS Cross-Country World Cup =

Cross-country skiing competition

Discipline	Men	Women
Overall	(Norway) Bjørn Dæhlie (3rd title)	(Russia) Yelena Välbe (4th title)
Nations Cup	Norway	Russia
- Nations Cup Overall: Russia

Competition
Locations	10 venues	10 venues
Individual	15 events	15 events
Relay/Team	events	events

The 1994–95 FIS Cross-Country World Cup was a multi-race tournament over a season for cross-country skiers. It was the 14th official World Cup season in cross-country skiing for men and women. The World Cup was organised by the International Ski Federation who also run world cups and championships in ski jumping, snowboarding and alpine skiing amongst others.

Bjørn Dæhlie reclaimed the crystal World Cup globe which Vladimir Smirnov had won in the 1993–94 season, thus taking his third overall men's World Cup title in four seasons. Smirnov won more races, with six wins including three during the 1995 World Championships, but Dæhlie was usually the runner-up. Also, one of Smirnov's World Championship wins didn't count towards the overall standings. Silvio Fauner, Harri Kirvesniemi, Torgny Mogren and Alexey Prokurorov also registered World Cup wins during the season.

In the women's Cup, Yelena Välbe won the six first events, and eventually won nine of the 15 races including one gold at the World Championships. Russians occupied the top five spots in the women's World Cup, with multiple races having three or more Russians on top of the standings. Only the Lahti 10 km was not won by a Russian skier, and in 11 of the 15 races did Russians occupy the top two spots in the standings. According to the Norwegian publication Sportsboken, the Russian women had not been this dominant since the 1970s.

== Calendar ==
=== Men ===
C – Classic / F – Freestyle
WC	Date	Place	Discipline	Winner	Second	Third	Ref.
1	27 November 1994	(Sweden) Kiruna	10 km C	(Norway) Bjørn Dæhlie	(Kazakhstan) Vladimir Smirnov	(Norway) Kristen Skjeldal	
2	14 December 1994	(Austria) Tauplitzalm	15 km C	(Russia) Alexey Prokourorov	(Norway) Bjørn Dæhlie	(Sweden) Niklas Jonsson	
3	17 December 1994	(Italy) Sappada	15 km F	(Norway) Bjørn Dæhlie	(Italy) Silvio Fauner	(Finland) Jari Isometsä	
4	20 December 1994	(Italy) Sappada	10 km F	(Sweden) Torgny Mogren	(Sweden) Henrik Forsberg	(Kazakhstan) Vladimir Smirnov	
5	8 January 1995	(Sweden) Östersund	30 km F	(Norway) Bjørn Dæhlie	(Russia) Alexey Prokourorov	(Norway) Thomas Alsgaard	
6	14 January 1995	(Czech Republic) Nové Město	15 km C	(Finland) Harri Kirvesniemi	(Finland) Jari Isometsä	(Italy) Silvio Fauner	
7	27 January 1995	(Finland) Lahti	15 km F	(Kazakhstan) Vladimir Smirnov	(Norway) Bjørn Dæhlie	(Finland) Jari Isometsä	
8	29 January 1995	(Finland) Lahti	15 km C	(Kazakhstan) Vladimir Smirnov	(Finland) Jari Isometsä	(Norway) Bjørn Dæhlie	
9	4 February 1995	(Sweden) Falun	30 km C	(Norway) Bjørn Dæhlie	(Italy) Silvio Fauner	(Kazakhstan) Vladimir Smirnov	
10	11 February 1995	(Norway) Oslo	50 km C	(Kazakhstan) Vladimir Smirnov	(Russia) Alexey Prokourorov	(Russia) Mikhail Botvinov	
FIS Nordic World Ski Championships 1995 (Note: Until FIS Nordic World Ski Championships 1999, World Championship races are part of the World Cup. Hence results from those races are included in the World Cup overall.) (9–19 March)
11	9 March 1995	(Canada) Thunder Bay	30 km C	(Kazakhstan) Vladimir Smirnov	(Norway) Bjørn Dæhlie	(Russia) Alexey Prokourorov	
12	11 March 1995	(Canada) Thunder Bay	10 km F	(Kazakhstan) Vladimir Smirnov	(Norway) Bjørn Dæhlie	(Finland) Mika Myllylä	
13	13 March 1995	(Canada) Thunder Bay	15 km F Pursuit	(Kazakhstan) Vladimir Smirnov	(Italy) Silvio Fauner	(Finland) Jari Isometsä	
14	19 March 1995	(Canada) Thunder Bay	50 km F	(Italy) Silvio Fauner	(Norway) Bjørn Dæhlie	(Kazakhstan) Vladimir Smirnov	
15	25 March 1995	(Japan) Sapporo	15 km F	(Norway) Bjørn Dæhlie	(Kazakhstan) Vladimir Smirnov	(Norway) Thomas Alsgaard	

=== Women ===
WC	Date	Place	Discipline	Winner	Second	Third	Ref.
1	27 November 1994	Kiruna, Sweden	5 km C	Yelena Välbe (RUS)	Nina Gavrylyuk (RUS)	Trude Dybendahl (NOR)	
Välbe won the 15-minute race with a 15-second margin, while Dybendahl took the only other podium place – it was to be the only podium place for Norway until Lahti.
2	14 December 1994	Tauplitz, Austria	10 km C	Yelena Välbe (RUS)	Nina Gavrylyuk (RUS)	Olga Danilova (RUS)	
After a two-week break, the skiers resumed with a Wednesday race in Tauplitz, for the first World Cup race in the Austrian resort in five years. Välbe doubled her advantage to Gavrylyuk, while Danilova took third place in Dybendahl's absence, improving from 12th place in Kiruna. Larisa Lazutina placed fourth to complete the row of Russians.
3	17 December 1994	Sappada, Italy	15 km F	Yelena Välbe (RUS)	Olga Korneyeva (RUS)	Nina Gavrylyuk (RUS)	
The Russians went one better than in Tauplitz, occupying the first five spots. Välbe won by 41 seconds, while Korneeva overtook both Gavrylyuk and Danilova in the longer distance, and earned the right to a relay stage for the first team the following day.
4	20 December 1994	Sappada, Italy	5 km F	Yelena Välbe (RUS); Nina Gavrylyuk (RUS)		Olga Korneyeva (RUS)	
In the final race before Christmas, someone managed to come close to Välbe. It was the same podium as the 15 km three days earlier, but Korneyeva was distanced by 11 seconds. Seven Russians placed on top of the standings.
5	7 January 1995	Östersund, Sweden	30 km F	Yelena Välbe (RUS)	Stefania Belmondo (ITA)	Nina Gavrylyuk (RUS)	
Välbe won again, but Belmondo showed form by becoming the second non-Russian to make a podium place, more than 45 seconds ahead of third-placed Gavrylyuk in the longest freestyle World Cup race of the season.
6	14 January 1995	Nové Město, Czech Republic	15 km C	Yelena Välbe (RUS)	Larisa Lazutina (RUS)	Nina Gavrylyuk (RUS)	
Välbe's sixth successive victory, in the first classical race in exactly one month. Once again four Russians placed in the top four.
7	28 January 1995	Lahti, Finland	10 km C	Inger Helene Nybråten (NOR)	Marit Mikkelsplass (NOR)	Larisa Lazutina (RUS)	
The Russians struggled with worse skis, allowing Norway to take the two top spots and get five women among the top eight. World Cup leader Välbe, unbeaten thus far in the season, finished 15th. Third-placed Lazutina was 3.9 seconds behind Nybråten, the smallest margin thus far in the season.
8	4 February 1995	Falun, Sweden	10 km C	Nina Gavrylyuk (RUS)	Yelena Välbe (RUS)	Larisa Lazutina (RUS)	
Once more four Russians occupied the four top spots, in a closer race than in Lahti; Lazutina was only 3.2 seconds behind the gold medallist. Gavrylyuk finally won a race outright, after having placed among the top four in every race up to this.
9	5 February 1995	Falun, Sweden	10 km F Pursuit	Yelena Välbe (RUS)	Nina Gavrylyuk (RUS)	Larisa Lazutina (RUS)	
The four Russians started with an advantage from the classical race, and remained in the lead. In the dash for the finish, Välbe was well ahead of her Russian compatriots.
10	11 February 1995	Oslo, Norway	30 km C	Larisa Lazutina (RUS)	Anita Moen Guidon (NOR)	Olga Danilova (RUS)	
The traditional Holmenkollen race ended without Välbe on the podium; Moen Guidon finished strongly, but finished 19 seconds behind Lazutina. Moen caught Danilova, who started half a minute ahead, and the pair got second and third, Danilova beating World Cup leader Välbe by a couple of seconds.
FIS Nordic World Ski Championships 1995 (9–19 March)
11	10 March 1995	Thunder Bay, Canada	15 km C	Larisa Lazutina (RUS)	Yelena Välbe (RUS)	Inger Helene Nybråten (NOR)	
A month's break followed, as the skiers acclimatised to conditions in Canada. Välbe had not recovered to her pre-January form, admitting before the Championships that Lazutina was going to win everything. Indeed, Lazutina won by over a minute, the largest margin of victory per kilometre in the World Cup season. Nybråten took her second podium place of the season and what was to be her only individual international medal.
12	12 March 1995	Thunder Bay, Canada	5 km C	Larisa Lazutina (RUS)	Nina Gavrylyuk (RUS)	Manuela Di Centa (ITA)	
Välbe without a medal again, finishing fourth, but still clinching the World Cup overall standings. Lazutina won by 23 seconds, while the Norwegians complained of poor skis in the heat (15 °C), and Di Centa, two-time gold medallist at Lillehammer in 1994, got her first podium place of the season after recovering from surgery to the intestines.
13	14 March 1995	Thunder Bay, Canada	10 km F Pursuit	Larisa Lazutina (RUS)	Nina Gavrylyuk (RUS)	Olga Danilova (RUS)	
Danilova rallied from 15th place in the 5 km to record the best time of the race, but after trailing by a minute after the classical race, it was only enough for bronze. Lazutina had the second-best time and Gavrylyuk the third, while Välbe finished 12th.
14	18 March 1995	Thunder Bay, Canada	30 km F	Yelena Välbe (RUS)	Manuela Di Centa (ITA)	Antonina Ordina (SWE)	
Välbe took her sixth individual World Championship gold, and her eighth win of the season, as classical-specialist Lazutina fell to fifth place. The margin of victory was more than a minute. Di Centa got her second podium place, and her 140 points from the World Championships made up 85% of her total World Cup score. Russian-born Ordina took Sweden's only individual podium place of the season.
15	25 March 1995	Sapporo, Japan	15 km F	Yelena Välbe (RUS)	Larisa Lazutina (RUS)	Nina Gavrylyuk (RUS)	
Of the long-distance free style medallists in Thunder Bay, Di Centa didn't turn up, Ordina finished fourth, while Välbe won by half a minute in her last race of the season. It was an all-Russian podium for the seventh time this season.

=== Men's team ===
C – Classic / F – Freestyle
WC	Date	Place	Discipline	Winner	Second	Third	Ref.
1	18 December 1994	(Italy) Sappada	4 × 10 km relay F	Norway I Egil Kristiansen; Kristen Skjeldal; Bjørn Dæhlie; Thomas Alsgaard	Finland Sami Repo; Jukka Hartonen; Jari Isometsä; Mika Myllylä	Sweden Morgan Göransson; Torgny Mogren; Christer Majbäck; Henrik Forsberg	
2	15 January 1995	(Norway) Nové Město	4 × 10 km relay C	Finland Karri Hietamäki; Jari Isometsä; Harri Kirvesniemi; Mika Myllylä	Sweden Mathias Fredriksson; Niklas Jonsson; Christer Majbäck; Henrik Forsberg	Italy Fabio Maj; Silvio Fauner; Gaudenzio Godioz; Marco Albarello	
3	5 February 1995	(Sweden) Falun	4 × 10 km relay C	Norway Sture Sivertsen; Terje Langli; Bjørn Dæhlie; Thomas Alsgaard	Finland Jari Räsänen; Jukka Hartonen; Jari Isometsä; Mika Myllylä	Sweden I Mathias Fredriksson; Anders Bergström; Lars Håland; Henrik Forsberg	
N/A (Note: Unofficial World Cup race inside the Olympic speed skating arena of Vikingskipet.)	5 February 1995	(Norway) Hamar	4 × 5.5 km relay F	Italy Maurizio Pozzi; Gaudenzio Godioz; Fabio Maj; Silvio Fauner	Finland Jari Isometsä; Mika Myllylä; Jukka Hartonen; Jari Räsänen	Germany Peter Schlickenrieder; Jochen Behle; Torald Rein; Andreas Schlütter	
4	12 February 1995	(Norway) Oslo	4 × 5 km relay C/F	Finland Karri Hietamäki; Harri Kirvesniemi; Mika Kuusisto; Sami Repo	Sweden Mathias Fredriksson; Niklas Jonsson; Torgny Mogren; Henrik Forsberg	Norway I Sture Sivertsen; Erling Jevne; Egil Kristiansen; Thomas Alsgaard	
5	17 March 1995	(Canada) Thunder Bay	4 × 10 km relay C/F	Norway Sture Sivertsen; Erling Jevne; Bjørn Dæhlie; Thomas Alsgaard	Finland Karri Hietamäki; Harri Kirvesniemi; Jari Räsänen; Jari Isometsä	Italy Fulvio Valbusa; Marco Albarello; Fabio Maj; Silvio Fauner	
6	26 March 1995	(Japan) Sapporo	4 × 10 km relay C/F	Norway Vegard Ulvang; Bjørn Dæhlie; Kristen Skjeldal; Thomas Alsgaard	Italy Marco Albarello; Silvio Fauner; Gaudenzio Godioz; Fabio Maj	Finland Mika Kuusisto; Harri Kirvesniemi; Sami Repo; Jari Isometsä	

=== Women's team ===
WC	Date	Place	Discipline	Winner	Second	Third	Ref.
1	18 December 1994	Sappada, Italy	4 × 5 km relay C	Russia I Olga Danilova; Nina Gavrylyuk; Olga Korneyeva; Yelena Välbe	Russia II Olga Pyleva; Yelena Shalina; Larisa Lazutina; Natalya Martynova	Norway I Anita Moen; Elin Nilsen; Marit Mikkelsplass; Trude Dybendahl	
Russia showed their dominance of female free-style cross-country skiing with two teams ahead of the competition; Russia I won by nearly a minute, while Norway in third place were a further 20 seconds behind.
2	15 January 1995	Nové Město, Czech Republic	4 × 5 km relay C	Russia I Olga Danilova; Nina Gavrylyuk; Larisa Lazutina; Yelena Välbe	Norway Inger Helene Nybråten; Marit Mikkelsplass; Kari Uglem; Maj Helen Sorkmo	Russia II Olga Pyleva; Yelena Shalina; Natalya Baranova; Olga Korneyeva	
With the relay being in classical style, Norway managed to beat the second Russian team; however, Russia's first team, made up of the top four in the previous day's race, won by a minute. The race time was slow, with Russia recording a total time of 65 minutes, nearly 20 minutes slower than in Sappada.
3	27 January 1995	Lahti, Finland	4 × 5 km relay F	Russia I Olga Korneyeva; Nina Gavrylyuk; Larisa Lazutina; Yelena Välbe	Russia II Olga Pyleva; Yelena Shalina; Natalya Martynova; Olga Danilova	Norway Anita Moen; Elin Nilsen; Trude Dybendahl; Bente Martinsen	
The second double Russian triumph in a free-style relay this season, though the distance between Russia's first team and second team was almost four times as great as that between Russia's second and Norway.
N/A	7 February 1995	Hamar, Norway	4 × 3 km relay F	Russia Olga Danilova; Nina Gavrylyuk; Larisa Lazutina; Yelena Välbe	Norway Anita Moen; Elin Nilsen; Bente Martinsen; Trude Dybendahl	Italy Sabina Valbusa; Guidina Dal Sasso; Cristina Paluselli; Stefania Belmondo	
In a Tuesday show race inside the Olympic speed skating arena of Vikingskipet, Norway came closer to Russia than they had ever been, but still finished 12 seconds behind.
4	12 February 1995	Oslo, Norway	4 × 5 km relay C/F	Russia I Olga Danilova; Larisa Lazutina; Nina Gavrylyuk; Yelena Välbe	Norway I Marit Mikkelsplass; Inger Helene Nybråten; Elin Nilsen; Anita Moen	Russia II Natalya Baranova; Yelena Shalina; Olga Korneyeva; Natalya Martynova	
Russia won by 30 seconds, the closest win margin in a relay thus far in the season, while the Russian second team and the Norwegian second team followed.
5	17 March 1995	Thunder Bay, Canada	4 × 5 km relay C/F	Russia Olga Danilova; Larisa Lazutina; Yelena Välbe; Nina Gavrylyuk	Norway Marit Mikkelsplass; Inger Helene Nybråten; Elin Nilsen; Anita Moen	Sweden Anna Frithioff; Marie-Helene Östlund; Antonina Ordina; Anette Fanqvist	
Russia were dominant, winning by more than a minute and a half. Danilova went straight to the lead on the first stage, outside the classical tracks, and Norwegian leaders commented that they could have protested but did not want to. Except for Välbe, all the Russian skiers had the best stage time. Ordina pulled away from Nilsen on the third stage, winning half a minute, but Moen Guidon caught Fanqvist in the final sprint and beat her to the finish line, winning silver by one tenth of a second.
6	26 March 1995	Sapporo, Japan	4 × 5 km relay C/F	Russia Nina Gavrylyuk; Larisa Lazutina; Natalya Martynova; Yelena Välbe	Norway Trude Dybendahl; Inger Helene Nybråten; Marit Mikkelsplass; Elin Nilsen	Sweden Anna Frithioff; Marie-Helene Östlund; Antonina Ordina; Anette Fanqvist	

== Overall results ==
Below are tables showing the number of points won in the 1994–95 FIS Cross-Country World Cup for men and women.

11 races counted towards the total; the 9 best of the 11 races outside the World Championships, as well as the two best World Championship races.

Place	Points
1st	100
2nd	80
3rd	60
4th	50
5th	45
6th	40
7th	36
8th	32
9th	29
10th	26
11th	24
12th	22
13th	20
14th	18
15th	16
16th	15
17th	14
18th	13
19th	12
20th	11
21st	10
22nd	9
23rd	8
24th	7
25th	6
26th	5
27th	4
28th	3
29th	2
30th	1

=== Men ===
Pos	Skier	Points
1	(Norway) Bjørn Dæhlie	930
2	(Kazakhstan) Vladimir Smirnov	866
3	(Italy) Silvio Fauner	591
4	(Russia) Alexey Prokurorov	572
5	(Finland) Jari Isometsä	525
6	(Norway) Thomas Alsgaard	429
7	(Finland) Harri Kirvesniemi	363
8	(Finland) Mika Myllylä	340
9	(Sweden) Torgny Mogren	330
10	(Russia) Mikhail Botvinov	269
11	(Norway) Kristen Skjeldal	268
12	(Sweden) Henrik Forsberg	256
13	(Norway) Erling Jevne	236
14	(Austria) Alois Stadlober	217
15	(Italy) Gaudenzio Godioz	213
16	(Norway) Vegard Ulvang	208
17	(Austria) Markus Gandler	194
18	(Sweden) Niklas Jonsson	182
19	(Norway) Egil Kristiansen	158
20	(Italy) Marco Albarello	152
21	(Sweden) Mathias Fredriksson	136
22	(Germany) Jochen Behle	129
22	(Italy) Fulvio Valbusa	129
24	(Sweden) Anders Bergström	127
25	(Finland) Jukka Hartonen	112
26	(Italy) Fabio Maj	111
27	(Norway) Sture Sivertsen	110
28	(Germany) Johan Mühlegg	104
29	(Sweden) Christer Majbäck	96
29	(Liechtenstein) Markus Hasler	96
31	(Spain) Juan Jesús Gutiérrez	93
32	(Sweden) Morgan Göransson	77
32	(Germany) Uwe Bellmann	77
34	(Norway) Terje Langli	74
35	(Finland) Karri Hietamäki	68
36	(Finland) Sami Repo	62
37	(France) Hervé Balland	58
38	(Germany) Andreas Schlütter	56
39	(Norway) Anders Eide	54
40	(Czech Republic) Luboš Buchta	51
41	(Italy) Giorgio Vanzetta	50
42	(Finland) Kimmo Kuusisto	49
43	(Russia) Vladimir Legotine	42
44	(Sweden) Sven-Erik Danielsson	40
44	(Finland) Jari Räsänen	40
44	(Italy) Maurizio Pozzi	40
47	(Germany) Peter Schlickenrieder	33
47	(Italy) Silvano Barco	33
49	(Russia) Sergey Chepikov	32
49	(Norway) Sigurd Brørs	32
51	(Italy) Pietro Piller Cottrer	31
52	(Kazakhstan) Pavel Riabinine	28
53	(Sweden) Håkan Nordbäck	27
53	(Japan) Hiroyuki Imai	27
55	(Norway) Krister Sørgård	24
55	(Switzerland) Jeremias Wigger	24
57	(Russia) Grigoriy Gutnikov	22
57	(Russia) Gennady Lazutin	22
57	(France) Philippe Sanchez	22
60	(Sweden) Peter Göransson	20

=== Women ===
Pos	Skier	Points
1	(Russia) Yelena Välbe	1060
2	(Russia) Nina Gavrylyuk	840
3	(Russia) Larisa Lazutina	785
4	(Russia) Olga Danilova	547
5	(Russia) Olga Korneyeva	395
6	(Norway) Inger Helene Nybråten	386
7	(Italy) Stefania Belmondo	377
8	(Norway) Marit Mikkelsplass	361
9	(Norway) Anita Moen	295
10	(Norway) Trude Dybendahl	290
11	(Norway) Elin Nilsen	283
12	(Sweden) Antonina Ordina	279
13	(Sweden) Marie-Helene Östlund	268
14	(Czech Republic) Kateřina Neumannová	229
15	(Switzerland) Sylvia Honegger	200
16	(Russia) Natalya Martynova	195
17	(Italy) Guidina Dal Sasso	172
18	(Finland) Pirkko Määttä	170
19	(Finland) Tuulikki Pyykkönen	167
20	(Italy) Manuela Di Centa	163
21	(Russia) Yelena Schalina	152
21	(Russia) Olga Pyleva	152
23	(Finland) Merja Kuusisto	146
24	(Germany) Sigrid Wille	141
25	(Norway) Bente Martinsen	123
26	(Ukraine) Iryna Terelia	110
27	(Italy) Gabriella Paruzzi	108
28	(Slovakia) Alžbeta Havrančíková	100
29	(Estonia) Kristina Šmigun	93
30	(Germany) Anke Schulze	86
31	(Russia) Natalya Baranova	83
32	(Sweden) Anna Frithioff	78
33	(Germany) Ina Kümmel	69
34	(Japan) Fumiko Aoki	66
35	(Italy) Sabina Valbusa	65
36	(France) Sophie Villeneuve	55
37	(Germany) Constanze Blum	54
38	(Sweden) Anette Fanqvist	49
39	(Germany) Manuela Henkel	46
40	(Norway) Maj Helen Sorkmo	41
40	(Poland) Małgorzata Ruchała	41
42	(Norway) Kari Uglem	38
43	(Italy) Cristina Paluselli	37
44	(Switzerland) Brigitte Albrecht	34
45	(Norway) Inger Lise Hegge	32
46	(United States) Leslie Thompson	31
47	(Poland) Dorota Kwaśna	29
47	(Sweden) Annika Evaldsson	29
49	(Slovakia) Jaroslava Bukvajová	28
49	(United States) Nina Kemppel	28
51	(Slovenia) Nataša Lačen	27
52	(Czech Republic) Iveta Fortová	25
53	(Finland) Virpi Niemi	24
54	(Estonia) Cristel Vahtra	22
55	(Japan) Sumiko Yokoyama	15
55	(Italy) Natalie Santer	15
57	(Slovakia) Tatiana Kutlíková	11
58	(Austria) Gerhild Pfügler	10
58	(Finland) Kati Pulkkinen	10
60	(Austria) Maria Theurl	9

== Achievements ==
Victories in this World Cup (all-time number of victories as of 1994/95 season in parentheses)

Men

- Vladimir Smirnov (KAZ), 6 (22) first places
- Bjørn Dæhlie (NOR), 5 (24) first places
- Torgny Mogren (SWE), 1 (13) first place
- Alexey Prokourorov (RUS), 1 (6) first place
- Harri Kirvesniemi (FIN), 1 (5) first place
- Silvio Fauner (ITA), 1 (1) first place

Women

- Yelena Välbe (RUS), 9 (33) first places
- Larisa Lazutina (RUS), 4 (7) first places
- Nina Gavrilyuk (RUS), 2 (2) first places
- Inger Helene Nybråten (NOR), 1 (4) first place
