= Olga Danilova =

Russian cross-country skier (born 1970)

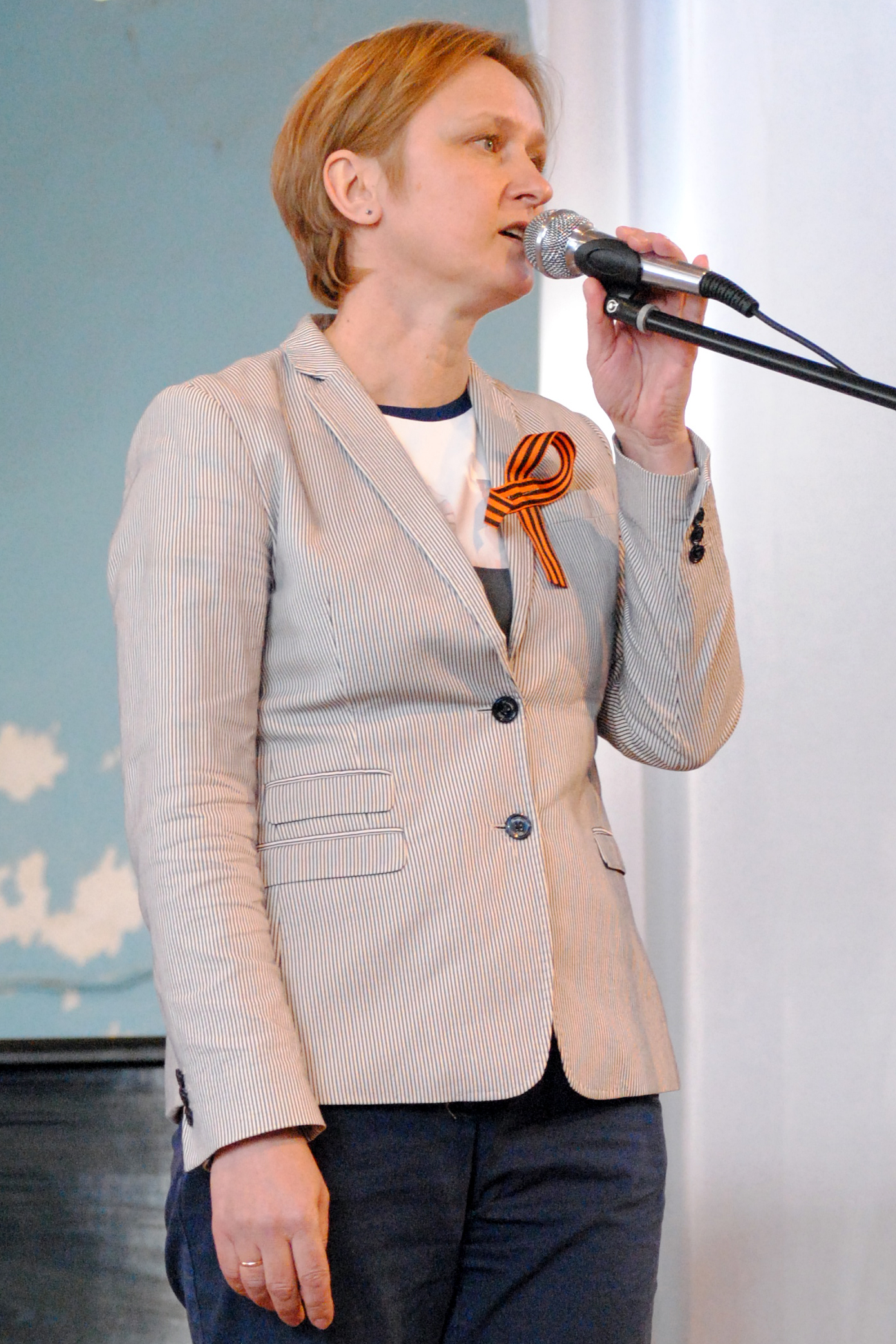

Personal information
- Full name: Olga Valeryevna Danilova
- Nationality: Russia
- Born: 10 June 1970 (age 56) Bugulma, Russian SFSR, Soviet Union

Sport
- Sport: Skiing

World Cup career
- Seasons: 11 – (1991–1995, 1997–2002)
- Indiv. starts: 114
- Indiv. podiums: 18
- Indiv. wins: 4
- Team starts: 30
- Team podiums: 26
- Team wins: 20
- Overall titles: 0 – (4th in 1995, 2000)
- Discipline titles: 0
Medal record
Women's cross-country skiing
Representing Russia
Olympic Games
Gold medal – first place	1998 Nagano	15 km classical
Gold medal – first place	1998 Nagano	4 × 5 km relay
Silver medal – second place	1998 Nagano	5 km + 10 km combined pursuit
Disqualified	2002 Salt Lake City	5 km + 5 km combined pursuit
Disqualified	2002 Salt Lake City	10 km classical
World Championships
Gold medal – first place	1995 Thunder Bay	4 × 5 km relay
Gold medal – first place	1997 Trondheim	4 × 5 km relay
Gold medal – first place	1999 Ramsau	4 × 5 km relay
Gold medal – first place	2001 Lahti	4 × 5 km relay
Silver medal – second place	1999 Ramsau	5 km classical
Silver medal – second place	1999 Ramsau	30 km classical
Silver medal – second place	2001 Lahti	10 km classical
Silver medal – second place	2001 Lahti	15 km classical
Bronze medal – third place	1995 Thunder Bay	5 km + 10 km combined pursuit
Bronze medal – third place	1997 Trondheim	5 km classical
Bronze medal – third place	2001 Lahti	5 km + 5 km combined pursuit
Junior World Championships
Representing Soviet Union
Gold medal – first place	1989 Vang	4 × 5 km relay
Gold medal – first place	1990 Les Saisies	5 km classical
Gold medal – first place	1990 Les Saisies	4 × 5 km relay
Bronze medal – third place	1989 Vang	5 km classical
Bronze medal – third place	1990 Les Saisies	15 km freestyle

Olga Valeryevna Danilova (Russian: Ольга Валерьевна Данилова; born 10 June 1970 in Bugulma, Tatar ASSR, Russian SFSR) is a Russian cross-country skier who competed from 1991 until she was banned for using performance-enhancing drugs in 2002.

== Career ==
Her statistics are listed as height: 168 cm (5 ft 6 in), weight: 56 kg (123 lb).

Danilova won a total of eleven medals at the FIS Nordic World Ski Championships, including four golds (4 × 5 km relay: 1995, 1997, 1999, 2001), four silvers (5 km: 1999, 10 km: 2001, 15 km: 2001, 30 km: 1999), and three bronzes (5 km + 10 km combined pursuit: 1995, 5 km: 1997, 5 km + 5 km combined pursuit: 2001). She also won the 30 km event at the Holmenkollen ski festival in 2000.

In 1992, Danilova made her Olympic debut. She won three medals at the 1998 Winter Olympics in Nagano, with a gold in the 15 km classical and the 4 × 5 km relay, and a silver in the 5 km + 10 km combined pursuit.

In 2002, she again participated in the cross-country skiing events at the 2002 Winter Olympics. Danilova won two medals with a gold in the 5 km + 5 km combined pursuit and a silver in the 10 km classical. However, she was one of three cross-country skiers (together with Johann Mühlegg and Larisa Lazutina) who were disqualified after blood tests indicated the use of darbepoetin, a drug intended to boost red blood cell production.

In February 2004, the International Olympic Committee stripped Danilova's 2002 Olympic medals following a Court of Arbitration for Sport ruling in December 2003. The results were amended accordingly. As a result of the use of the banned substance, Olga Danilova received a two-year ban by the International Ski Federation in 2002.

== Cross-country skiing results ==
All results are sourced from the International Ski Federation (FIS).

=== Olympic Games ===
- 3 medals – (2 gold, 1 silver)

Year	Age	5 km	10 km	15 km	Pursuit	30 km	Sprint	4 × 5 km relay
1992	21	6	—N/a	—	11	20	—N/a	—
1998	27	5	—N/a	Gold	Silver	13	—N/a	Gold
2002	31	—N/a	DSQ	—	DSQ	DSQ	—	DNS

=== World Championships ===
- 11 medals – (4 gold, 4 silver, 3 bronze)

Year	Age	5 km	10 km	15 km	Pursuit	30 km	Sprint	4 × 5 km relay
1993	22	—	—N/a	8	—	—	—N/a	—
1995	24	15	—N/a	5	Bronze	4	—N/a	Gold
1997	26	Bronze	—N/a	4	5	6	—N/a	Gold
1999	28	Silver	—N/a	6	5	Silver	—N/a	Gold
2001	30	—N/a	Silver	Silver	Bronze	CNX^{[a]}	—	Gold

a. ^{1} Cancelled due to extremely cold weather.

=== World Cup ===
==== Season standings ====
Season	Age				
Season	Age	Overall	Long Distance	Middle Distance	Sprint
1991	20	21	—N/a	—N/a	—N/a
1992	21	22	—N/a	—N/a	—N/a
1993	22	20	—N/a	—N/a	—N/a
1994	23	15	—N/a	—N/a	—N/a
1995	24	4	—N/a	—N/a	—N/a
1997	26	5	5	—N/a	8
1998	27	7	4	—N/a	10
1999	28	8	5	—N/a	11
2000	29	4	3rd place, bronze medalist(s)	5	7
2001	30	7	—N/a	—N/a	49
2002	31	7	—N/a	—N/a	—

==== Individual podiums ====
- 4 victories
- 18 podiums

No.	Season	Date	Location	Race	Level	Place
1	1994–95	14 December 1994	Tauplitzalm, Austria	10 km Individual C	World Cup	3rd
2	1994–95	11 February 1995	Oslo, Norway	30 km Individual C	World Cup	3rd
3	1994–95	14 March 1995	Thunder Bay, Canada	10 km Pursuit F	World Championships^{[1]}	3rd
4	1996–97	23 February 1997	Trondheim, Norway	5 km Individual C	World Championships^{[1]}	3rd
5	1998–99	19 December 1998	Davos, Switzerland	15 km Individual C	World Cup	1st
6	1998–99	22 February 1999	Ramsau, Austria	5 km Individual C	World Championships^{[1]}	2nd
7	1998–99	27 February 1999	Ramsau, Austria	30 km Individual C	World Championships^{[1]}	2nd
8	1999–00	12 December 1999	Sappada, Italy	5 km + 7.5 km Skiathlon C/F	World Cup	3rd
9	1999–00	18 December 1999	Davos, Switzerland	15 km Individual C	World Cup	1st
10	1999–00	5 February 2000	Lillehammer, Norway	5 km + 5 km Skiathlon C/F	World Cup	2nd
11	1999–00	11 March 2000	Oslo, Norway	30 km Individual C	World Cup	1st
12	1999–00	17 March 2000	Bormio, Italy	5 km Individual C	World Cup	2nd
13	2000–01	16 December 2000	Brusson, Italy	10 km Individual C	World Cup	2nd
14	2000–01	10 February 2001	Otepää, Estonia	5 km Individual C	World Cup	3rd
15	2001–02	24 November 2001	Kuopio, Finland	10 km Individual C	World Cup	2nd
16	2001–02	8 December 2001	Cogne, Italy	5 km Individual C	World Cup	2nd
17	2001–02	5 January 2002	Val di Fiemme, Italy	5 km + 5 km Skiathlon C/F	World Cup	1st
18	2001–02	8 January 2002	Val di Fiemme, Italy	15 km Mass Start C	World Cup	2nd

==== Team podiums ====
- 20 victories – (20 RL)
- 26 podiums – (25 RL, 1 TS)

No.	Season	Date	Location	Race	Level	Place	Teammate(s)
1	1994–95	15 January 1995	Nové Město, Czech Republic	4 × 5 km Relay C	World Cup	1st	Gavrylyuk / Lazutina / Välbe
2	1994–95	29 January 1995	Lahti, Finland	4 × 5 km Relay F	World Cup	2nd	Zamorozova / Martynova / Shalina
3	1994–95	7 February 1995	Hamar, Norway	4 × 3 km Relay F	World Cup	1st	Gavrylyuk / Lazutina / Välbe
4	1994–95	12 February 1995	Oslo, Norway	4 × 5 km Relay C/F	World Cup	1st	Lazutina / Gavrylyuk / Välbe
5	1994–95	17 March 1995	Thunder Bay, Canada	4 × 5 km Relay C/F	World Championships^{[1]}	1st	Lazutina / Välbe / Gavrylyuk
6	1996–97	24 November 1996	Kiruna, Sweden	4 × 5 km Relay C	World Cup	2nd	Nageykina / Zavyalova / Chepalova
7	1996–97	8 December 1996	Davos, Switzerland	4 × 5 km Relay C	World Cup	3rd	Baranova-Masalkina / Nageykina / Chepalova
8	1996–97	15 December 1996	Brusson, Italy	4 × 5 km Relay F	World Cup	1st	Gavrylyuk / Yegorova / Välbe
9	1996–97	28 February 1997	Trondheim, Norway	4 × 5 km Relay C/F	World Championships^{[1]}	1st	Lazutina / Gavrylyuk / Välbe
10	1996–97	9 March 1997	Falun, Sweden	4 × 5 km Relay C/F	World Cup	1st	Lazutina / Gavrylyuk / Välbe
11	1996–97	16 March 1997	Oslo, Norway	4 × 5 km Relay F	World Cup	1st	Gavrylyuk / Nageykina / Välbe
12	1997–98	23 November 1997	Beitostølen, Norway	4 × 5 km Relay C	World Cup	1st	Baranova-Masalkina / Gavrylyuk / Lazutina
13	1997–98	7 December 1997	Santa Caterina, Italy	4 × 5 km Relay F	World Cup	1st	Välbe / Chepalova / Lazutina
14	1997–98	14 December 1997	Val di Fiemme, Italy	4 × 5 km Relay F	World Cup	1st	Nageykina / Välbe / Lazutina
15	1997–98	6 March 1998	Lahti, Finland	4 × 5 km Relay C/F	World Cup	1st	Lazutina / Gavrylyuk / Chepalova
16	1997–98	10 March 1998	Falun, Sweden	6 × 1.6 km Team Sprint F	World Cup	3rd	Skladneva
17	1998–99	29 November 1998	Muonio, Finland	4 × 5 km Relay F	World Cup	1st	Reztsova / Lazutina / Gavrylyuk
18	1998–99	20 December 1998	Davos, Switzerland	4 × 5 km Relay C/F	World Cup	1st	Nageykina / Lazutina / Gavrylyuk
19	1998–99	26 February 1999	Ramsau, Austria	4 × 5 km Relay C/F	World Championships^{[1]}	1st	Lazutina / Reztsova / Gavrylyuk
20	1999–00	28 November 1999	Kiruna, Sweden	4 × 5 km Relay F	World Cup	2nd	Nageykina / Lazutina / Gavrylyuk
21	1999–00	19 December 1999	Davos, Switzerland	4 × 5 km Relay C	World Cup	1st	Nageykina / Lazutina / Gavrylyuk
22	1999–00	13 January 2000	Nové Město, Czech Republic	4 × 5 km Relay C/F	World Cup	1st	Nageykina / Yegorova / Gavrylyuk
23	1999–00	27 February 2000	Falun, Sweden	4 × 5 km Relay F	World Cup	1st	Zavyalova / Lazutina / Chepalova
24	1999–00	4 March 2000	Lahti, Finland	4 × 5 km Relay C/F	World Cup	1st	Gavrylyuk / Zavyalova / Chepalova
25	2000–01	26 November 2000	Beitostølen, Norway	4 × 5 km Relay C/F	World Cup	2nd	Yegorova / Lazutina / Chepalova
26	2001–02	27 November 2001	Kuopio, Finland	4 × 5 km Relay C/F	World Cup	1st	Baranova-Masalkina / Gavrylyuk / Chepalova

Note: ^{1} Until the 1999 World Championships, World Championship races were included in the World Cup scoring system.

== See also ==
- List of sportspeople sanctioned for doping offences
