= Larisa Lazutina =

Russian former cross-country skier (born 1965)

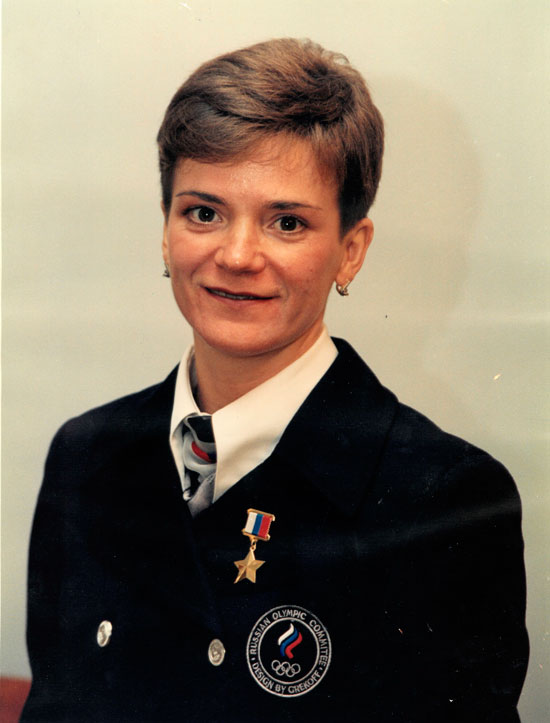
- Lazutina in 1998

Personal information
- Native name: Лариса Лазутина
- Full name: Larisa Yevgenyevna Lazutina
- Nationality: Russia
- Born: Larisa Yevgenyevna Ptitsyna; 1 June 1965 (age 61) Kondopoga, Russian SFSR, Soviet Union
- Height: 1.67 m (5 ft 6 in)

Sport
- Sport: Skiing

World Cup career
- Seasons: 17 – (1984–1987, 1989–1990, 1992–2002)
- Indiv. starts: 165
- Indiv. podiums: 62
- Indiv. wins: 21
- Team starts: 44
- Team podiums: 41
- Team wins: 33
- Overall titles: 2 – (1990, 1998)
- Discipline titles: 2 – (2 LD)
Medal record
Women's cross-country skiing
Representing Russia
Olympic Games
Gold medal – first place	1992 Albertville	4 × 5 km relay
Gold medal – first place	1994 Lillehammer	4 × 5 km relay
Gold medal – first place	1998 Nagano	4 × 5 km relay
Gold medal – first place	1998 Nagano	5 km classical
Gold medal – first place	1998 Nagano	5 km + 10 km combined pursuit
Silver medal – second place	1998 Nagano	15 km classical
Bronze medal – third place	1998 Nagano	30 km freestyle
Disqualified	2002 Salt Lake City	15 km freestyle
Disqualified	2002 Salt Lake City	5 km + 5 km combined pursuit
World Championships
Gold medal – first place	1993 Falun	5 km classical
Gold medal – first place	1993 Falun	4 × 5 km relay
Gold medal – first place	1995 Thunder Bay	5 km classical
Gold medal – first place	1995 Thunder Bay	5 km + 10 km combined pursuit
Gold medal – first place	1995 Thunder Bay	15 km classical
Gold medal – first place	1995 Thunder Bay	4 × 5 km relay
Gold medal – first place	1997 Trondheim	4 × 5 km relay
Gold medal – first place	1999 Ramsau	30 km classical
Gold medal – first place	1999 Ramsau	4 × 5 km relay
Gold medal – first place	2001 Lahti	4 × 5 km relay
Silver medal – second place	1993 Falun	5 km + 10 km combined pursuit
Silver medal – second place	2001 Lahti	5 km + 5 km combined pursuit
Bronze medal – third place	2001 Lahti	10 km classical
Representing Unified Team
Olympic Games
Gold medal – first place	1992 Albertville	4 × 5 km relay
Representing Soviet Union
World Championships
Gold medal – first place	1987 Oberstdorf	4 × 5 km relay
Silver medal – second place	1989 Lahti	30 km freestyle
Bronze medal – third place	1987 Oberstdorf	20 km freestyle
Junior World Championships
Gold medal – first place	1985 Täsch	3 × 5 km relay

Larisa Yevgenyevna Lazutina (Russian: Лариса Евгеньевна Лазутина; née Ptitsyna; born 1 June 1965) is a Russian former professional cross-country skier.

== Career ==
Lazutina was awarded the Holmenkollen medal in 1998 (shared with Fred Børre Lundberg, Alexey Prokurorov and Harri Kirvesniemi). She made her Olympic debut in 1988. Lazutina won her first Olympic medal in 1992, winning a team gold that year. At the 1994 Winter Olympics, Lazutina won a further relay gold. At the 1998 Winter Olympics in Nagano, Japan, she won five medals: three gold, one silver and one bronze. She was the most successful athlete at the 1998 Winter Games. After the Olympics, Boris Yeltsin awarded her the title Hero of the Russian Federation.

Lazutina earned numerous medals at the FIS Nordic World Ski Championships. She won a total of sixteen medals, including eleven gold, three silver and two bronze medals. She was also the first three-time winner of the women's 30 km event at the Holmenkollen ski festival (1995, 1998 and 2001).

In 2002, at her fifth Olympics, she again participated in the cross-country skiing events at the 2002 Winter Olympics. Lazutina won two medals with a gold in the 5 km + 5 km combined pursuit and a silver in the 10 km classical. However, she was one of three cross-country skiers (together with Johann Mühlegg and Olga Danilova) who were disqualified after blood tests indicated the use of darbepoetin, a drug intended to boost red blood cell production.

In February 2004, the International Olympic Committee stripped Lazutina's 2002 Olympic medals following a Court of Arbitration for Sport ruling in December 2003. The results were amended accordingly. As a result of the use of the banned substance, Larisa Lazutina received a two-year ban by the International Ski Federation in 2002.

In 2015, a sports park named after Lazutina opened in Odintsovo, Moscow region. Its full name is Sports and recreational park of Hero of Russia Larisa Lazutina.

== Cross-country skiing results ==
All results are sourced from the International Ski Federation (FIS).

=== Olympic Games ===
- 7 medals – (5 gold, 1 silver, 1 bronze)

Year	Age	5 km	10 km	15 km	Pursuit	30 km	Sprint	4 × 5 km relay
1992	26	7	—N/a	—	8	5	—N/a	Gold
1994	28	6	—N/a	5	4	—	—N/a	Gold
1998	32	Gold	—N/a	Silver	Gold	Bronze	—N/a	Gold
2002	36	—N/a	DSQ	DSQ	DSQ	DSQ	—	DNS

=== World Championships ===
- 16 medals – (11 gold, 3 silver, 2 bronze)

Year	Age	5 km	10 km classical	10 km freestyle	15 km	Pursuit	20 km	30 km	Sprint	4 × 5 km relay
1987	21	—	7	—N/a	—N/a	—N/a	Bronze	—N/a	—N/a	Gold
1989	23	—N/a	—	8	9	—N/a	—N/a	Silver	—N/a	Silver
1993	27	Gold	—N/a	—N/a	4	Silver	—N/a	4	—N/a	Gold
1995	29	Gold	—N/a	—N/a	Gold	Gold	—N/a	5	—N/a	Gold
1997	31	4	—N/a	—N/a	10	6	—N/a	4	—N/a	Gold
1999	33	—	—N/a	—N/a	8	—	—N/a	Gold	—N/a	Gold
2001	35	—N/a	Bronze	—N/a	7	Silver	—N/a	CNX^{[a]}	—	Gold

a. ^{1} Cancelled due to extremely cold weather.

=== World Cup ===
==== Season titles ====
- 4 titles – (2 overall, 2 long distance)

Season
Season	Discipline
1990	Overall
1998	Overall
1998	Long Distance
2000	Long Distance

==== Season standings ====
Season	Age				
Season	Age	Overall	Long Distance	Middle Distance	Sprint
1984	18	49	—N/a	—N/a	—N/a
1986	20	25	—N/a	—N/a	—N/a
1987	21	13	—N/a	—N/a	—N/a
1989	23	5	—N/a	—N/a	—N/a
1990	24	1st place, gold medalist(s)	—N/a	—N/a	—N/a
1992	26	11	—N/a	—N/a	—N/a
1993	27	4	—N/a	—N/a	—N/a
1994	28	5	—N/a	—N/a	—N/a
1995	29	3rd place, bronze medalist(s)	—N/a	—N/a	—N/a
1996	30	3rd place, bronze medalist(s)	—N/a	—N/a	—N/a
1997	31	8	6	—N/a	10
1998	32	1st place, gold medalist(s)	1st place, gold medalist(s)	—N/a	2nd place, silver medalist(s)
1999	33	5	3rd place, bronze medalist(s)	—N/a	6
2000	34	3rd place, bronze medalist(s)	1st place, gold medalist(s)	3	15
2001	35	3rd place, bronze medalist(s)	—N/a	—N/a	15
2002	36	54	—N/a	—N/a	NC

==== Individual podiums ====
- 21 victories
- 62 podiums

No.	Season	Date	Location	Race	Level	Place
1	1986–87	20 February 1987	Oberstdorf, West Germany	20 km Individual F	World Championships^{[1]}	3rd
2	1988–89	14 December 1988	Campra, Switzerland	15 km Individual F	World Cup	3rd
3	1988–89	25 February 1989	Lahti, Finland	30 km Individual F	World Championships^{[1]}	2nd
4	1989–90	14 December 1988	Soldier Hollow, United States	15 km Individual F	World Cup	2nd
5	1989–90	15 December 1989	Thunder Bay, Canada	15 km Individual C	World Cup	1st
6	1989–90	14 January 1990	Moscow, Soviet Union	7.5 km Individual C	World Cup	3rd
7	1989–90	18 February 1990	Pontresina, Switzerland	15 km Individual F	World Cup	3rd
8	1989–90	2 March 1990	Lahti, Finland	5 km Individual F	World Cup	3rd
9	1989–90	10 March 1990	Örnsköldsvik, Sweden	10 km Individual C	World Cup	3rd
10	1989–90	17 March 1990	Vang, Norway	10 km + 10 km Pursuit C/F	World Cup	2nd
11	1992–93	12 December 1992	Ramsau, Austria	5 km Individual C	World Cup	3rd
12	1992–93	18 December 1992	Val di Fiemme, Italy	15 km Individual F	World Cup	2nd
13	1992–93	21 February 1993	Falun, Sweden	5 km Individual C	World Championships^{[1]}	1st
14	1992–93	23 February 1993	Falun, Sweden	10 km Pursuit F	World Championships^{[1]}	2nd
15	1993–94	19 March 1994	Thunder Bay, Canada	5 km Individual C	World Cup	1st
16	1993–94	20 March 1994	Thunder Bay, Canada	10 km Pursuit F	World Cup	2nd
17	1994-95	14 January 1995	Nové Město, Czech Republic	15 km Individual C	World Cup	2nd
18	1994-95	28 January 1995	Lahti, Finland	10 km Individual C	World Cup	3rd
19	1994-95	4 February 1995	Falun, Sweden	10 km Individual C	World Cup	3rd
20	1994-95	5 February 1995	Falun, Sweden	10 km Pursuit F	World Cup	3rd
21	1994-95	11 February 1995	Oslo, Norway	30 km Individual C	World Cup	1st
22	1994-95	10 March 1995	Thunder Bay, Canada	15 km Individual C	World Championships^{[1]}	1st
23	1994-95	12 March 1995	Thunder Bay, Canada	5 km Individual C	World Championships^{[1]}	1st
24	1994-95	14 March 1995	Thunder Bay, Canada	10 km Pursuit F	World Championships^{[1]}	1st
25	1994-95	25 March 1995	Sapporo, Japan	15 km Individual F	World Cup	2nd
26	1995–96	10 December 1995	Davos, Switzerland	10 km Individual C	World Cup	3rd
27	1995–96	17 December 1995	Santa Caterina, Italy	10 km Individual C	World Cup	1st
28	1995–96	13 January 1996	Nové Město, Czech Republic	10 km Individual C	World Cup	3rd
29	1995–96	11 February 1996	Kavgolovo, Russia	10 km Individual C	World Cup	2nd
30	1995–96	24 February 1996	Trondheim, Norway	5 km Individual C	World Cup	3rd
31	1995–96	16 March 1996	Oslo, Norway	30 km Individual C	World Cup	2nd
32	1996–97	5 January 1997	Kavgolovo, Russia	15 km Individual F	World Cup	2nd
33	1997–98	22 November 1997	Beitostølen, Norway	5 km Individual C	World Cup	1st
34	1997–98	13 December 1997	Val di Fiemme, Italy	5 km Individual C	World Cup	3rd
35	1997–98	16 December 1997	Val di Fiemme, Italy	15 km Individual F	World Cup	1st
36	1997–98	4 January 1998	Kavgolovo, Russia	10 km Individual F	World Cup	3rd
37	1997–98	9 January 1998	Ramsau, Austria	5 km Individual C	World Cup	2nd
38	1997–98	11 January 1998	Ramsau, Austria	10 km Pursuit F	World Cup	2nd
39	1997–98	7 March 1998	Lahti, Finland	15 km Individual F	World Cup	2nd
40	1997–98	11 March 1998	Falun, Sweden	5 km Individual F	World Cup	1st
41	1997–98	14 March 1998	Oslo, Norway	30 km Individual C	World Cup	1st
42	1998–99	19 December 1998	Davos, Switzerland	15 km Individual C	World Cup	3rd
43	1998–99	27 February 1999	Ramsau, Austria	30 km Individual C	World Championships^{[1]}	1st
44	1998–99	7 March 1999	Lahti, Finland	10 km Individual C	World Cup	1st
45	1998–99	13 March 1999	Falun, Sweden	15 km Individual C	World Cup	1st
46	1999–00	10 December 1999	Sappada, Italy	10 km Individual F	World Cup	2nd
47	1999–00	12 December 1999	Sappada, Italy	5 km + 7.5 km Skiathlon C/F	World Cup	1st
48	1999–00	18 December 1999	Davos, Switzerland	15 km Individual C	World Cup	2nd
49	1999–00	12 January 2000	Nové Město, Czech Republic	10 km Individual C	World Cup	1st
50	1999–00	2 February 2000	Lillehammer, Norway	5 km + 5 km Skiathlon C/F	World Cup	1st
51	1999–00	20 February 2000	Transjurassienne, France	44 km Mass Start F	World Cup	3rd
52	1999–00	26 February 2000	Falun, Sweden	10 km Individual F	World Cup	3rd
53	1999–00	5 March 2000	Lahti, Finland	15 km Mass Start C	World Cup	1st
54	1999–00	11 March 2000	Oslo, Norway	30 km Individual C	World Cup	2nd
55	2000–01	8 December 2000	Santa Caterina, Italy	10 km Individual F	World Cup	3rd
56	2000–01	16 December 2000	Brusson, Italy	10 km Individual F	World Cup	3rd
57	2000–01	4 March 2001	Kavgolovo, Russia	15 km Individual F	World Cup	2nd
58	2000–01	10 March 2001	Oslo, Norway	30 km Individual C	World Cup	1st
59	2000–01	14 March 2001	Borlänge, Sweden	5 km Individual F	World Cup	3rd
60	2000–01	17 March 2001	Falun, Sweden	10 km Individual F	World Cup	2nd
61	2000–01	18 March 2001	Falun, Sweden	10 km Individual C	World Cup	1st
62	2000–01	24 March 2001	Kuopio, Finland	40 km Mass Start F	World Cup	3rd

==== Team podiums ====
- 33 victories
- 41 podiums

No.	Season	Date	Location	Race	Level	Place	Teammates
1	1986–87	20 February 1987	Oberstdorf, West Germany	4 × 5 km Relay F	World Championships^{[1]}	1st	Ordina / Gavrylyuk / Reztsova
2	1986–87	1 March 1987	Lahti, Finland	4 × 5 km Relay C/F	World Cup	1st	Ordina / Välbe / Reztsova
3	1988–89	12 March 1989	Falun, Sweden	4 × 5 km Relay C	World Cup	2nd	Smetanina / Tikhonova / Välbe
4	1989–90	4 March 1990	Lahti, Finland	4 × 5 km Relay F	World Cup	2nd	Nageykina / Smetanina / Yegorova
5	1989–90	11 March 1990	Örnsköldsvik, Sweden	4 × 5 km Relay C/F	World Cup	1st	Yegorova / Tikhonova / Välbe
6	1991–92	18 February 1992	Albertville, France	4 × 5 km Relay C/F	Olympic Games^{[1]}	1st	Välbe / Smetanina / Yegorova
7	1991–92	8 March 1992	Funäsdalen, Sweden	4 × 5 km Relay C	World Cup	2nd	Välbe / Nageykina / Yegorova
8	1992–93	26 February 1993	Falun, Sweden	4 × 5 km Relay C/F	World Championships^{[1]}	1st	Välbe / Gavrylyuk / Yegorova
9	1993–94	22 February 1994	Lillehammer, Norway	4 × 5 km Relay C/F	Olympic Games^{[1]}	1st	Välbe / Gavrylyuk / Yegorova
10	1993–94	4 March 1994	Lahti, Finland	4 × 5 km Relay C	World Cup	2nd	Nageykina / Gavrylyuk / Välbe
11	1993–94	13 March 1994	Falun, Sweden	4 × 5 km Relay F	World Cup	1st	Nageykina / Gavrylyuk / Välbe
12	1994–95	15 January 1995	Nové Město, Czech Republic	4 × 5 km Relay C	World Cup	1st	Danilova / Gavrylyuk / Välbe
13	1994–95	29 January 1995	Lahti, Finland	4 × 5 km Relay F	World Cup	1st	Zavyalova / Gavrylyuk / Välbe
14	1994–95	7 February 1995	Hamar, Norway	4 × 3 km Relay F	World Cup	1st	Danilova / Gavrylyuk / Välbe
15	1994–95	12 February 1995	Oslo, Norway	4 × 5 km Relay C/F	World Cup	1st	Danilova / Gavrylyuk / Välbe
16	1994–95	17 March 1995	Thunder Bay, Canada	4 × 5 km Relay C/F	World Championships^{[1]}	1st	Danilova / Välbe / Gavrylyuk
17	1994–95	26 March 1995	Sapporo, Japan	4 × 5 km Relay C/F	World Cup	1st	Gavrylyuk / Martynova / Välbe
18	1995–96	17 December 1995	Santa Caterina, Italy	4 × 5 km Relay C	World Cup	1st	Gavrylyuk / Yegorova / Välbe
19	1995–96	14 January 1996	Nové Město, Czech Republic	4 × 5 km Relay C	World Cup	1st	Nageykina / Gavrylyuk / Välbe
20	1995–96	10 March 1996	Falun, Sweden	4 × 5 km Relay C/F	World Cup	1st	Gavrylyuk / Yegorova / Välbe
21	1995–96	17 March 1996	Oslo, Norway	4 × 5 km Relay C/F	World Cup	1st	Nageykina / Zavyalova / Gavrylyuk
22	1996–97	24 November 1996	Kiruna, Sweden	4 × 5 km Relay C	World Cup	1st	Gavrylyuk / Yegorova / Välbe
23	1996–97	8 December 1996	Davos, Switzerland	4 × 5 km Relay C	World Cup	2nd	Gavrylyuk / Yegorova / Välbe
24	1996–97	15 December 1996	Brusson, Italy	4 × 5 km Relay F	World Cup	2nd	Zavyalova / Nageykina / Chepalova
25	1996–97	28 February 1997	Trondheim, Norway	4 × 5 km Relay C/F	World Championships^{[1]}	1st	Danilova / Gavrylyuk / Välbe
26	1996–97	9 March 1997	Falun, Sweden	4 × 5 km Relay C/F	World Cup	1st	Danilova / Gavrylyuk / Välbe
27	1997–98	23 November 1997	Beitostølen, Norway	4 × 5 km Relay C	World Cup	1st	Baranova-Masalkina / Danilova / Gavrylyuk
28	1997–98	7 December 1997	Santa Caterina, Italy	4 × 5 km Relay F	World Cup	1st	Välbe / Chepalova / Danilova
29	1997–98	14 December 1997	Val di Fiemme, Italy	4 × 5 km Relay F	World Cup	1st	Nageykina / Välbe / Danilova
30	1997–98	6 March 1998	Lahti, Finland	4 × 5 km Relay C/F	World Cup	1st	Danilova / Gavrylyuk / Chepalova
31	1998–99	29 November 1998	Muonio, Finland	4 × 5 km Relay F	World Cup	1st	Danilova / Reztsova / Gavrylyuk
32	1998–99	20 December 1998	Davos, Switzerland	4 × 5 km Relay C/F	World Cup	1st	Danilova / Nageykina / Gavrylyuk
33	1998–99	26 February 1999	Ramsau, Austria	4 × 5 km Relay C/F	World Championships^{[1]}	1st	Danilova / Reztsova / Gavrylyuk
34	1998–99	14 March 1999	Falun, Sweden	4 × 5 km Relay C/F	World Cup	1st	Nageykina / Baranova-Masalkina / Chepalova
35	1998–99	21 March 1999	Oslo, Norway	4 × 5 km Relay C	World Cup	1st	Nageykina / Gavrylyuk / Chepalova
36	1999–00	28 November 1999	Kiruna, Sweden	4 × 5 km Relay F	World Cup	2nd	Nageykina / Danilova / Gavrylyuk
37	1999–00	19 December 1999	Davos, Switzerland	4 × 5 km Relay C	World Cup	1st	Nageykina / Gavrylyuk / Danilova
38	1999–00	13 January 2000	Nové Město, Czech Republic	4 × 5 km Relay C/F	World Cup	1st	Danilova / Nageykina / Yegorova
39	1999–00	27 February 2000	Falun, Sweden	4 × 5 km Relay F	World Cup	1st	Danilova / Zavyalova / Chepalova
40	2000–01	26 November 2000	Beitostølen, Norway	4 × 5 km Relay C/F	World Cup	2nd	Danilova / Yegorova / Chepalova
41	2000–01	9 December 2000	Santa Caterina, Italy	4 × 3 km Relay CF	World Cup	1st	Gavrylyuk / Zavyalova / Chepalova

Note: ^{1} Until the 1999 World Championships and the 1994 Olympics, World Championship and Olympic races were included in the World Cup scoring system.

== Personal life ==
She is married to cross-country skier Gennady Lazutin.

== See also ==
- List of female Heroes of the Russian Federation
- List of sportspeople sanctioned for doping offences
- List of multiple Olympic gold medalists
- List of multiple Olympic gold medalists in one event
