= Nina Gavrylyuk =

Russian cross-country skier (born 1965)

Personal information
- Full name: Nina Vasilyevna Gavrylyuk
- Nationality: Russia
- Born: 13 April 1965 (age 61) Leningrad, Soviet Union

Sport
- Sport: Skiing
- Club: Dynamo Saint Petersburg

World Cup career
- Seasons: 14 – (1987–1989, 1993–2003)
- Indiv. starts: 172
- Indiv. podiums: 35
- Indiv. wins: 5
- Team starts: 46
- Team podiums: 42
- Team wins: 31
- Overall titles: 0 – (2nd in 1995)
- Discipline titles: 0
Medal record
Women's cross-country skiing
Olympic Games
Representing Soviet Union
Gold medal – first place	1988 Calgary	4 × 5 km relay
Representing Russia
Gold medal – first place	1994 Lillehammer	4 × 5 km relay
Gold medal – first place	1998 Nagano	4 × 5 km relay
Bronze medal – third place	1994 Lillehammer	15 km freestyle
World Championships
Representing Soviet Union
Gold medal – first place	1987 Oberstdorf	4 × 5 km relay
Representing Russia
Gold medal – first place	1993 Falun	4 × 5 km relay
Gold medal – first place	1995 Thunder Bay	4 × 5 km relay
Gold medal – first place	1997 Trondheim	4 × 5 km relay
Gold medal – first place	1999 Ramsau	4 × 5 km relay
Gold medal – first place	2001 Lahti	4 × 5 km relay
Silver medal – second place	1995 Thunder Bay	5 km classical
Silver medal – second place	1995 Thunder Bay	5 km + 10 km combined pursuit
Silver medal – second place	1999 Ramsau	5 km + 10 km combined pursuit
Bronze medal – third place	1997 Trondheim	5 km + 10 km combined pursuit
Bronze medal – third place	2003 Val di Fiemme	4 × 5 km relay

Nina Vasilyevna Gavrylyuk (Russian: Ни́на Васи́льевна Гаврылю́к; born 13 April 1965) is a former Soviet (until 1991) and Russian cross-country skier who competed from 1987 to 2003. Born in Leningrad, she won four medals at the Winter Olympics with three golds (4 × 5 km relay: 1988, 1994, 1998) and one bronze (15 km: 1994).

In Soviet time she trained at VSS Trud in Leningrad. Gavrylyuk's biggest success was at the FIS Nordic World Ski Championships, where she earned eleven medals. This included six golds (4 × 5 km relay: 1987, 1993, 1995, 1997, 1999, 2001), three silvers (5 km: 1995, 5 km + 10 km combined pursuit: 1995, 1999), and two bronzes (5 km + 10 km combined pursuit: 1997, 4 × 5 km relay: 2003.

She also won the 30 km event at the Holmenkollen Ski Festival in 1996.

== Cross-country skiing results ==
All results are sourced from the International Ski Federation (FIS).

=== Olympic Games ===
- 4 medals – (4 gold, 1 bronze)

Year	Age	5 km	10 km	15 km	Pursuit	20 km	30 km	Sprint	4 × 5 km relay
1988	22	—	—	—N/a	—N/a	DSQ	—N/a	—N/a	Gold
1994	28	11	—N/a	Bronze	5	—N/a	—	—N/a	Gold
1998	32	4	—N/a	—	7	—N/a	—	—N/a	Gold
2002	36	—N/a	—	—	5	—N/a	—	20	DNS

=== World Championships ===
- 11 medals – (6 gold, 3 silver, 2 bronze)

Year	Age	5 km	10 km classical	10 km freestyle	15 km	Pursuit	20 km	30 km	Sprint	4 × 5 km relay
1987	21	—	—	—N/a	—N/a	—N/a	—	—N/a	—N/a	Gold
1989	23	—N/a	—	5	—	—N/a	—N/a	—	—N/a	—
1993	27	15	—N/a	—N/a	—	7	—N/a	8	—N/a	Gold
1995	29	Silver	—N/a	—N/a	6	Silver	—N/a	6	—N/a	Gold
1997	31	4	—N/a	—N/a	5	Bronze	—N/a	13	—N/a	Gold
1999	33	5	—N/a	—N/a	7	Silver	—N/a	—	—N/a	Gold
2001	35	—N/a	—	—N/a	—	8	—N/a	CNX^{[a]}	5	Gold
2003	37	—N/a	—	—N/a	—	12	—N/a	8	—	Bronze

a. ^{1} Cancelled due to extremely cold weather.

=== World Cup ===
==== Season standings ====
Season	Age				
Season	Age	Overall	Long Distance	Middle Distance	Sprint
1987	21	28	—N/a	—N/a	—N/a
1988	22	36	—N/a	—N/a	—N/a
1989	23	18	—N/a	—N/a	—N/a
1993	27	11	—N/a	—N/a	—N/a
1994	28	8	—N/a	—N/a	—N/a
1995	29	2nd place, silver medalist(s)	—N/a	—N/a	—N/a
1996	30	4	—N/a	—N/a	—N/a
1997	31	4	3rd place, bronze medalist(s)	—N/a	6
1998	32	11	14	—N/a	8
1999	33	3rd place, bronze medalist(s)	6	—N/a	4
2000	34	5	6	7	4
2001	35	8	—N/a	—N/a	11
2002	36	13	—N/a	—N/a	37
2003	37	18	—N/a	—N/a	NC

==== Individual podiums ====
- 5 victories
- 35 podiums

No.	Season	Date	Location	Race	Level	Place
1	1993–94	22 February 1994	Lillehammer, Norway	15 km Individual F	Olympic Games^{[1]}	3rd
2	1994–95	27 November 1994	Kiruna, Sweden	5 km Individual C	World Cup	2nd
3	1994–95	14 December 1994	Tauplitzalm, Austria	10 km Individual C	World Cup	3rd
4	1994–95	17 December 1994	Sappada, Italy	15 km Individual F	World Cup	3rd
5	1994–95	20 December 1994	Sappada, Italy	5 km Individual F	World Cup	1st
6	1994–95	7 January 1995	Östersund, Sweden	30 km Individual F	World Cup	3rd
7	1994–95	14 January 1995	Nové Město, Czech Republic	15 km Individual C	World Cup	3rd
8	1994–95	4 February 1995	Falun, Sweden	10 km Individual C	World Cup	1st
9	1994–95	5 February 1995	Falun, Sweden	10 km Pursuit F	World Cup	2nd
10	1994–95	12 March 1995	Thunder Bay, Canada	5 km Individual C	World Championships^{[1]}	2nd
11	1994–95	14 March 1995	Thunder Bay, Canada	10 km Pursuit F	World Championships^{[1]}	2nd
12	1994–95	25 March 1995	Sapporo, Japan	15 km Individual F	World Cup	3rd
13	1995–96	13 December 1995	Brusson, Italy	10 km Individual F	World Cup	3rd
14	1995–96	17 December 1995	Santa Caterina, Italy	10 km Individual C	World Cup	3rd
15	1995–96	25 February 1996	Trondheim, Norway	10 km Pursuit F	World Cup	3rd
16	1995–96	2 March 1996	Lahti, Finland	10 km Individual F	World Cup	3rd
17	1995–96	9 March 1996	Falun, Sweden	10 km Individual F	World Cup	3rd
18	1995–96	16 March 1996	Oslo, Norway	30 km Individual C	World Cup	1st
19	1996–97	23 November 1996	Kiruna, Sweden	5 km Individual F	World Cup	3rd
20	1996–97	7 December 1996	Davos, Switzerland	10 km Individual C	World Cup	3rd
21	1996–97	14 December 1996	Brusson, Italy	15 km Individual F	World Cup	3rd
22	1996–97	24 February 1997	Trondheim, Norway	10 km Pursuit F	World Championships^{[1]}	3rd
23	1998–99	22 November 1998	Muonio, Finland	5 km Individual F	World Cup	3rd
24	1998–99	12 December 1998	Toblach, Italy	5 km Individual F	World Cup	3rd
25	1998–99	13 December 1998	Toblach, Italy	10 km Individual C	World Cup	2nd
26	1998–99	12 January 1999	Nové Město, Czech Republic	15 km Individual F	World Cup	3rd
27	1998–99	14 February 1999	Seefeld, Austria	5 km Individual F	World Cup	1st
28	1998–99	23 February 1999	Ramsau, Austria	10 km Pursuit F	World Championships^{[1]}	2nd
29	1999–00	12 December 1999	Sappada, Italy	7.5 km Individual F	World Cup	2nd
30	1999–00	27 December 1999	Engelberg, Switzerland	1.0 km Sprint C	World Cup	1st
31	1999–00	8 January 2000	Moscow, Russia	15 km Individual F	World Cup	3rd
32	1999–00	2 February 2000	Trondheim, Norway	5 km Individual F	World Cup	2nd
33	2000–01	28 December 2000	Engelberg, Switzerland	1.0 km Sprint C	World Cup	3rd
34	2001–02	2 March 2002	Lahti, Finland	10 km Individual F	World Cup	3rd
35	2001–02	9 March 2002	Falun, Sweden	5 km + 5 km Pursuit C/F	World Cup	2nd

==== Team podiums ====
- 31 victories – (31 RL)
- 42 podiums – (40 RL, 2 TS)

No.	Season	Date	Location	Race	Level	Place	Teammate(s)
1	1986–87	17 February 1987	Oberstdorf, West Germany	4 × 5 km Relay F	World Championships^{[1]}	1st	Ordina / Lazutina / Reztsova
2	1987–88	21 February 1988	Calgary, Canada	4 × 5 km Relay F	Olympic Games^{[1]}	1st	Nageykina / Tikhonova / Reztsova
3	1992–93	26 February 1993	Falun, Sweden	4 × 5 km Relay C/F	World Championships^{[1]}	1st	Välbe / Lazutina / Yegorova
4	1993–94	22 February 1994	Lillehammer, Norway	4 × 5 km Relay C/F	Olympic Games^{[1]}	1st	Välbe / Lazutina / Yegorova
5	1993–94	4 March 1994	Lahti, Finland	4 × 5 km Relay C	World Cup	2nd	Nageykina / Lazutina / Välbe
6	1993–94	13 March 1994	Falun, Sweden	4 × 5 km Relay F	World Cup	1st	Nageykina / Lazutina / Välbe
7	1994–95	15 January 1995	Nové Město, Czech Republic	4 × 5 km Relay C	World Cup	1st	Danilova / Lazutina / Välbe
8	1994–95	29 January 1995	Lahti, Finland	4 × 5 km Relay F	World Cup	1st	Zavyalova / Lazutina / Välbe
9	1994–95	7 February 1995	Hamar, Norway	4 × 3 km Relay F	World Cup	1st	Danilova / Lazutina / Välbe
10	1994–95	12 February 1995	Oslo, Norway	4 × 5 km Relay C/F	World Cup	1st	Danilova / Lazutina / Välbe
11	1994–95	17 March 1995	Thunder Bay, Canada	4 × 5 km Relay C/F	World Championships^{[1]}	1st	Danilova / Lazutina / Välbe
12	1994–95	26 March 1995	Sapporo, Japan	4 × 5 km Relay C/F	World Cup	1st	Lazutina / Martynova / Välbe
13	1995–96	17 December 1995	Santa Caterina, Italy	4 × 5 km Relay C	World Cup	1st	Lazutina / Yegorova / Välbe
14	1995–96	14 January 1996	Nové Město, Czech Republic	4 × 5 km Relay C	World Cup	1st	Nageykina / Lazutina / Välbe
15	1995–96	10 March 1996	Falun, Sweden	4 × 5 km Relay C/F	World Cup	1st	Lazutina / Yegorova / Välbe
16	1995–96	17 March 1996	Oslo, Norway	4 × 5 km Relay C/F	World Cup	1st	Nageykina / Lazutina / Zavyalova
17	1996–97	24 November 1996	Kiruna, Sweden	4 × 5 km Relay C	World Cup	1st	Lazutina / Yegorova / Välbe
18	1996–97	8 December 1996	Davos, Switzerland	4 × 5 km Relay C	World Cup	2nd	Lazutina / Yegorova / Välbe
19	1996–97	15 December 1996	Brusson, Italy	4 × 5 km Relay F	World Cup	1st	Danilova / Yegorova / Välbe
20	1996–97	19 January 1997	Lahti, Finland	8 × 1.5 km Team Sprint F	World Cup	2nd	Välbe
21	1996–97	28 February 1997	Trondheim, Norway	4 × 5 km Relay C/F	World Championships^{[1]}	1st	Danilova / Lazutina / Välbe
22	1996–97	9 March 1997	Falun, Sweden	4 × 5 km Relay C/F	World Cup	1st	Danilova / Lazutina / Välbe
23	1996–97	16 March 1997	Oslo, Norway	4 × 5 km Relay F	World Cup	1st	Danilova / Nageykina / Välbe
24	1997–98	23 November 1997	Beitostølen, Norway	4 × 5 km Relay C	World Cup	1st	Baranova-Masalkina / Danilova / Lazutina
25	1997–98	7 December 1997	Santa Caterina, Italy	4 × 5 km Relay F	World Cup	2nd	Baranova-Masalkina / Zavyalova / Nageykina
26	1997–98	14 December 1997	Val di Fiemme, Italy	4 × 5 km Relay F	World Cup	3rd	Baranova-Masalkina / Zavyalova / Chepalova
27	1997–98	6 March 1998	Lahti, Finland	4 × 5 km Relay C/F	World Cup	1st	Danilova / Lazutina / Chepalova
28	1998–99	29 November 1998	Muonio, Finland	4 × 5 km Relay F	World Cup	1st	Danilova / Reztsova / Lazutina
29	1998–99	20 December 1998	Davos, Switzerland	4 × 5 km Relay C/F	World Cup	1st	Danilova / Nageykina / Lazutina
30	1998–99	10 January 1999	Nové Město, Czech Republic	4 × 5 km Relay C/F	World Cup	1st	Nageykina / Reztsova / Chepalova
31	1998–99	26 February 1999	Ramsau, Austria	4 × 5 km Relay C/F	World Championships^{[1]}	1st	Danilova / Lazutina / Reztsova
32	1998–99	14 March 1999	Falun, Sweden	4 × 5 km Relay C/F	World Cup	2nd	Yegorova / Reztsova / Skladneva
33	1998–99	21 March 1999	Oslo, Norway	4 × 5 km Relay C	World Cup	1st	Nageykina / Chepalova / Lazutina
34	1999–00	28 November 1999	Kiruna, Sweden	4 × 5 km Relay F	World Cup	2nd	Nageykina / Danilova / Lazutina
35	1999–00	19 December 1999	Davos, Switzerland	4 × 5 km Relay C	World Cup	1st	Nageykina / Lazutina / Danilova
36	1999–00	13 January 2000	Nové Město, Czech Republic	4 × 5 km Relay C/F	World Cup	2nd	Zavyalova / Skladneva / Chepalova
37	1999–00	27 February 2000	Falun, Sweden	4 × 5 km Relay F	World Cup	2nd	Yegorova / Nageykina / Skladneva
38	1999–00	4 March 2000	Lahti, Finland	4 × 5 km Relay C/F	World Cup	1st	Danilova / Zavyalova / Chepalova
39	2000–01	9 December 2000	Santa Caterina, Italy	4 × 3 km Relay C/F	World Cup	1st	Zavyalova / Lazutina / Chepalova
40	2001–02	27 November 2001	Kuopio, Finland	4 × 5 km Relay C/F	World Cup	1st	Danilova / Baranova-Masalkina / Chepalova
41	2001–02	2 March 2002	Lahti, Finland	4 × 1.5 km Team Sprint F	World Cup	2nd	Zavyalova
42	2002–03	8 December 2002	Davos, Switzerland	4 × 5 km Relay C/F	World Cup	2nd	Zavyalova / Vasilyeva / Medvedeva-Arbuzova

Note: ^{1} Until the 1999 World Championships and the 1994 Olympics, World Championship and Olympic races were included in the World Cup scoring system.
