= Yuliya Chepalova =

Russian cross-country skier

Yulia Chepalova
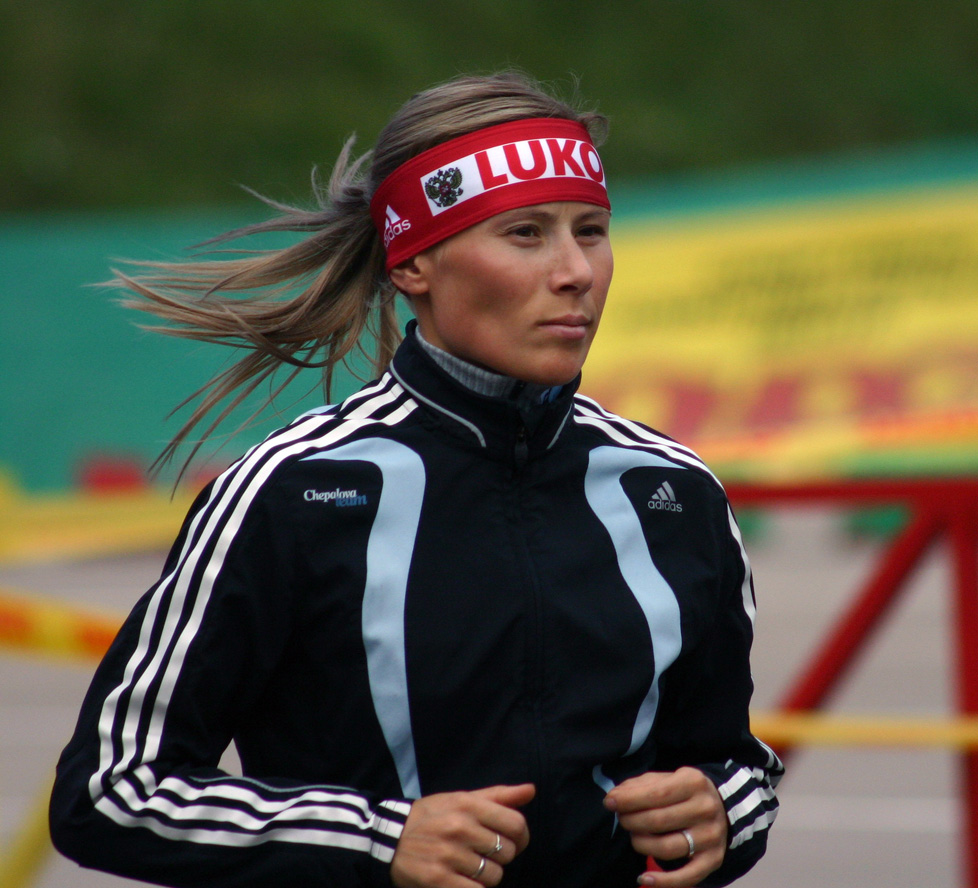
- Chepalova in September 2005

Personal information
- Full name: Yulia Anatolyevna; Chepalova
- Nationality: Russia
- Born: 23 December 1976 (age 49) Komsomolsk-on-Amur, Russian SFSR, Soviet Union
- Height: 1.64 m (5 ft 5 in)

Sport
- Sport: Skiing
- Club: Dynamo Moscow

World Cup career
- Seasons: 12 – (1996–2002, 2004–2006, 2008–2009)
- Indiv. starts: 174
- Indiv. podiums: 33
- Indiv. wins: 18
- Team starts: 48
- Team podiums: 25
- Team wins: 13
- Overall titles: 1 – (2001)
- Discipline titles: 1 – (DI: 2006)
Medal record
Women's cross-country skiing
Representing Russia
International nordic ski competitions
Event	1st	2nd	3rd
Olympic Games	3	2	1
World Championships	2	2	2
Total	5	4	3
Olympic Games
Gold medal – first place	1998 Nagano	30 km freestyle
Gold medal – first place	2002 Salt Lake City	Individual sprint
Gold medal – first place	2006 Turin	4 × 5 km relay
Silver medal – second place	2002 Salt Lake City	10 km classical
Silver medal – second place	2006 Turin	30 km freestyle
Bronze medal – third place	2002 Salt Lake City	15 km freestyle
World Championships
Gold medal – first place	2001 Lahti	4 × 5 km relay
Gold medal – first place	2005 Oberstdorf	15 km double pursuit
Silver medal – second place	2005 Oberstdorf	10 km freestyle
Silver medal – second place	2005 Oberstdorf	4 × 5 km relay
Bronze medal – third place	2001 Lahti	Individual sprint
Bronze medal – third place	2005 Oberstdorf	Team sprint
Junior World Championships
Gold medal – first place	1993 Harrachov	4 × 5 km relay
Gold medal – first place	1994 Breitenwang	15 km freestyle
Gold medal – first place	1995 Gällivare	15 km freestyle
Gold medal – first place	1995 Gällivare	4 × 5 km relay
Gold medal – first place	1996 Asiago	15 km freestyle
Gold medal – first place	1996 Asiago	4 × 5 km relay
Silver medal – second place	1993 Harrachov	15 km freestyle
Bronze medal – third place	1996 Asiago	5 km classical
European Youth Olympic Festival
Gold medal – first place	1993 Aosta	7.5 km freestyle
Silver medal – second place	1993 Aosta	5 km classical

Yulia Anatolyevna Chepalova (Russian: Ю́лия Анато́льевна Чепа́лова; born 23 December 1976 in Komsomolsk-on-Amur, Russian SFSR) is a former Russian cross-country skier.

== Early and current personal life ==
Daughter of a cross-country skiing coach, Chepalova started to ski as soon as she began to walk. Coached by her father, Anatoly Chepalov, Yulia made her debut in 1986 and continued to move upward through the old Soviet system (and later Russian, following the collapse of the Soviet Union in late 1991). Chepalov, a coach of the Russian junior national team, reportedly sold off all of his assets to help finance his daughter's career. Chepalova is currently affiliated with Dynamo Moscow, lives in Syktyvkar with her second husband, Vasily Rochev, and her daughter Olesya, and their daughter Vaselina who was born in February 2007; works as a sports instructor, and speaks, besides her native Russian, also some German.

== Skiing career ==
Debuting on the FIS cross-country circuit in the 1995–1996 season, Chepalova has continually ranked in the Top 15 throughout her career (the lone exception is the 2002–2003 season, where she took maternity leave to have her daughter Olesya), finishing #1 overall in 2000–2001 (#3 in 2005–2006 with #1 in the distance category (greater than 5 km)). This includes success at the FIS Nordic World Ski Championships, with golds in the 4 × 5 km relay (2001) and 7.5 km + 7.5 km double pursuit (2005), silvers in the 4 × 5 km relay and 10 km freestyle (both 2005), and bronzes in the Individual sprint (2001) and Team sprint (2005). Additionally, Chepalova has won the women's 30 km at the Holmenkollen ski festival three times (1999, 2004, and 2006), joining fellow Russian cross-country skier Larisa Lazutina as the only three-time winners of the event. She earned the Holmenkollen medal in 2004.

At the 1998 Winter Olympics, Chepalova won the women's 30 km freestyle event in her Olympic debut, becoming the youngest winner of that event (and in women's cross-country skiing). Four years later at the 2002 Winter Olympics, Chepalova won a complete set of medals with gold in the individual sprint, silver in the 10 km classical, and bronze in the 15 km freestyle. At the Winter Olympics in Turin, Chepalova would win two more medals with a gold in the 4 × 5 km relay and a silver in the 30 km freestyle mass start.

Chepalova was absent from the cross-country skiing World Cup for the 2006–2007 season due to her pregnancy.

She tested positive for Erythropoietin (EPO) during an in-competition doping control on 3 January 2009 in Val di Fiemme, Italy. She was banned from competition for two years after this.

Immediately after the EPO test results went public her father and coach Anatoly Chepalov officially announced her retirement. On 29 November 2009, Chepalova addressed IOC President Jacques Rogge where she came down hard on the World Anti-Doping Agency, accusing the organisation of being biased and unscrupulous in general, of unlawful ruling of her case in particular, and of "severing the career" of many good athletes but all the efforts to restore her good name were of no avail. Following this, in December 2009, Chepalova ostracised Russian Olympic Committee President Leonid Tyagachyov and Ski Federation of Russia President Vladimir Loginov for "their inaction in matters of defending the sportsmen whose guilt is not yet proven".

== Cross-country skiing results ==
All results are sourced from the International Ski Federation (FIS).

=== Olympic Games ===
- 6 medals – (3 gold, 2 silver, 1 bronze)

Year	Age	5 km individual	10 km individual	15 km	Pursuit	30 km	Sprint	4 × 5 km relay	Team sprint
1998	21	13	—N/a	—	6	Gold	—N/a	—	—N/a
2002	25	—N/a	Silver	Bronze	4	9	Gold	DNS^{[a]}	—N/a
2006	29	—N/a	26	—N/a	9	Silver	27	Gold	—

a. ^{1} Larisa Lazutina and Olga Danilova tested positive in the drug test which was taken an hour before the relay race, after their names were submitted for the race. Russia couldn't replace them because according to the rules, replacement must have been done at least two hours before the starting time.

=== World Championships ===
- 6 medals – (2 gold, 2 silver, 2 bronze)

Year	Age	10 km individual	15 km individual	Pursuit	30 km	Sprint	4 × 5 km relay	Team sprint
2001	24	—	10	7	CNX^{[a]}	Bronze	Gold	—N/a
2005	28	Silver	—N/a	Gold	10	—	Silver	Bronze
2009	32	—	—N/a	DSQ	DSQ	—	DSQ	—

a. ^{1} Cancelled due to extremely cold weather.

=== World Cup ===
==== Season titles ====
- 2 titles – (1 overall, 1 distance)

Season
Season	Discipline
2001	Overall
2006	Distance

==== Season standings ====
Season	Age	Discipline standings					Ski Tour standings	
Season	Age	Overall	Distance	Long Distance	Middle Distance	Sprint	Tour de Ski	World Cup Final
1996	19	14	—N/a	—N/a	—N/a	—N/a	—N/a	—N/a
1997	20	17	—N/a	13	—N/a	16	—N/a	—N/a
1998	21	10	—N/a	8	—N/a	11	—N/a	—N/a
1999	22	11	—N/a	7	—N/a	16	—N/a	—N/a
2000	23	7	—N/a	12	4	17	—N/a	—N/a
2001	24	1st place, gold medalist(s)	—N/a	—N/a	—N/a	4	—N/a	—N/a
2002	25	5	—N/a	—N/a	—N/a	20	—N/a	—N/a
2004	27	12	10	—N/a	—N/a	NC	—N/a	—N/a
2005	28	7	4	—N/a	—N/a	62	—N/a	—N/a
2006	29	3rd place, bronze medalist(s)	1st place, gold medalist(s)	—N/a	—N/a	40	—N/a	—N/a
2008	31	83	55	—N/a	—N/a	NC	—	54
2009	32	76	9	—N/a	—N/a	NC	DSQ	DSQ

==== Individual podiums ====
- 18 victories
- 33 podiums

No.	Season	Date	Location	Race	Level	Place
1	1997–98	4 January 1998	Kavgolovo, Russia	10 km F Individual	World Cup	1st
2	1997–98	11 March 1998	Falun, Sweden	5 km F Individual	World Cup	3rd
3	1998–99	20 March 1999	Oslo, Norway	30 km C Individual	World Cup	1st
4	1999–2000	10 December 1999	Sappada, Italy	10 km F Individual	World Cup	3rd
5	1999–2000	2 February 2000	Trondheim, Norway	30 km F Individual	World Cup	3rd
6	1999–2000	26 February 2000	Falun, Sweden	10 km F Individual	World Cup	1st
7	1999–2000	18 March 2000	Bormio, Italy	10 km F Pursuit	World Cup	1st
8	2000–01	8 December 2000	Santa Caterina, Italy	10 km F Individual	World Cup	1st
9	2000–01	20 December 2000	Davos, Switzerland	15 km C Individual	World Cup	1st
10	2000–01	29 December 2000	Engelberg, Switzerland	1 km Sprint F	World Cup	2nd
11	2000–01	4 February 2001	Nové Město, Czech Republic	1 km Sprint F	World Cup	1st
12	2000–01	4 March 2001	Kavgolovo, Russia	15 km F Individual	World Cup	1st
13	2000–01	14 March 2001	Borlänge, Sweden	5 km F Individual	World Cup	1st
14	2000–01	17 March 2001	Falun, Sweden	10 km F Individual	World Cup	1st
15	2000–01	18 March 2001	Falun, Sweden	10 km C Individual	World Cup	3rd
16	2000–01	24 March 2001	Kuopio, Finland	40 km F Individual	World Cup	1st
17	2001–02	25 November 2001	Kuopio, Finland	5 km F Individual	World Cup	2nd
18	2001–02	12 December 2001	Brusson, Italy	10 km F Individual	World Cup	1st
19	2001–02	12 January 2002	Nové Město, Czech Republic	5 km F Individual	World Cup	1st
20	2003–04	6 February 2004	La Clusaz, France	15 km F Individual	World Cup	2nd
21	2003–04	14 February 2004	Oberstdorf, Germany	7.5 km + 7.5 km C/F Pursuit	World Cup	1st
22	2003–04	28 February 2004	Oslo, Norway	30 km F Individual	World Cup	1st
23	2003–04	6 February 2004	Pragelato, Italy	15 km F Individual	World Cup	2nd
24	2004–05	15 January 2005	Nové Město, Czech Republic	10 km F Individual	World Cup	3rd
25	2004–05	12 February 2005	Reit im Winkl, Germany	10 km F Individual	World Cup	3rd
26	2004–05	6 March 2005	Lahti, Finland	10 km F Individual	World Cup	1st
27	2004–05	19 March 2005	Falun, Sweden	7.5 km + 7.5 km C/F Pursuit	World Cup	3rd
28	2005–06	27 November 2005	Rukatunturi, Finland	10 km F Individual	World Cup	2nd
29	2005–06	15 December 2005	Canmore, Canada	10 km F Individual	World Cup	1st
30	2005–06	17 December 2005	Canmore, Canada	15 km C Mass Start	World Cup	2nd
31	2005–06	31 December 2005	Nové Město, Czech Republic	10 km F Individual	World Cup	2nd
32	2005–06	14 January 2006	Val di Fiemme, Italy	15 km F Mass Start	World Cup	2nd
33	2005–06	11 March 2006	Oslo, Norway	30 km F Individual	World Cup	1st

==== Team podiums ====
- 13 victories – (11 RL, 2 TS)
- 25 podiums – (22 RL, 3 TS)

No.	Season	Date	Location	Race	Level	Place	Teammate(s)
1	1995–96	17 December 1995	Santa Caterina, Italy	4 × 5 km C Relay	World Cup	3rd	Nageykina / Baranova-Masalkina / Zavyalova
2	1996–97	24 November 1996	Kiruna, Sweden	4 × 5 km C Relay	World Cup	3rd	Nageykina / Zavyalova / Danilova
3	1996–97	8 December 1996	Davos, Switzerland	4 × 5 km C Relay	World Cup	3rd	Baranova-Masalkina / Nageykina / Danilova
4	1996–97	15 December 1996	Brusson, Italy	4 × 5 km F Relay	World Cup	2nd	Zavyalova / Nageykina / Lazutina
5	1997–98	7 December 1997	Santa Caterina, Italy	4 × 5 km F Relay	World Cup	1st	Välbe / Lazutina / Danilova
6	1997–98	14 December 1997	Val di Fieme, Italy	4 × 5 km F Relay	World Cup	3rd	Baranova-Masalkina / Zavyalova / Gavrylyuk
7	1997–98	6 March 1998	Lahti, Finland	4 × 5 km C/F Relay	World Cup	1st	Danilova / Lazutina / Gavrylyuk
8	1998–99	20 December 1998	Davos, Switzerland	4 × 5 km C/F Relay	World Cup	3rd	Denisova / Baranova-Masalkina / Reztsova
9	1998–99	10 January 1999	Nové Město, Czech Republic	4 × 5 km C/F Relay	World Cup	1st	Nageykina / Gavrylyuk / Reztsova
10	1998–99	14 March 1999	Falun, Sweden	4 × 5 km C/F Relay	World Cup	1st	Nageykina / Baranova-Masalkina / Lazutina
11	1998–99	21 March 1999	Oslo, Norway	4 × 5 km C Relay	World Cup	1st	Nageykina / Gavrylyuk / Lazutina
12	1999–2000	28 November 1999	Kiruna, Sweden	4 × 5 km F Relay	World Cup	1st	Yegorova / Skladneva / Reztsova
13	1999–2000	8 December 1999	Asiago, Italy	Team Sprint F	World Cup	3rd	Skladneva
14	1999–2000	13 January 2000	Nové Město, Czech Republic	4 × 5 km C/F Relay	World Cup	2nd	Zavyalova / Gavrylyuk / Skladneva
15	1999–2000	27 February 2000	Falun, Sweden	4 × 5 km F Relay	World Cup	1st	Danilova / Zavyalova / Lazutina
16	1999–2000	4 March 2000	Lahti, Finland	4 × 5 km C/F Relay	World Cup	1st	Danilova / Gavrylyuk / Zavyalova
17	2000–01	26 November 2000	Beitostølen, Norway	4 × 5 km C/F Relay	World Cup	2nd	Danilova / Yegorova / Lazutina
18	2000–01	9 December 2000	Santa Caterina, Italy	4 × 3 km C/F Relay	World Cup	1st	Gavrylyuk / Zavyalova / Lazutina
19	2000–01	13 December 2000	Clusone, Italy	6 × 1.5 km Team Sprint F	World Cup	1st	Zavyalova
20	2001–02	27 November 2001	Kuopio, Finland	4 × 5 km C/F Relay	World Cup	1st	Danilova / Baranova-Masalkina / Gavrylyuk
21	2001–02	13 January 2002	Nové Město, Czech Republic	4 × 1.5 km Team Sprint F	World Cup	1st	Medvedeva-Arbuzova
22	2003–04	22 February 2004	Umeå, Sweden	4 × 5 km C/F Relay	World Cup	2nd	Kurkina / Zavyalova / Vorontsova
23	2004–05	12 December 2004	Val di Fiemme, Italy	4 × 5 km C/F Relay	World Cup	1st	Kurkina / Baranova-Masalkina / Medvedeva-Arbuzova
24	2004–05	20 March 2005	Falun, Sweden	4 × 5 km C/F Relay	World Cup	3rd	Kurkina / Baranova-Masalkina / Medvedeva-Arbuzova
25	2005–06	15 January 2006	Val di Fiemme, Italy	4 × 5 km C/F Relay	World Cup	2nd	Rocheva / Baranova-Masalkina / Medvedeva-Arbuzova

==== Overall record ====
Result	Distance Races^{[a]}						Sprint	Ski Tours	Individual Events	Team Events		All Events
Result	≤ 5 km^{[b]}	≤ 10 km^{[b]}	≤ 15 km^{[b]}	≤ 30 km^{[b]}	≥ 30 km^{[b]}	Pursuit^{[c]}	Sprint	Ski Tours	Individual Events	Team Sprint	Relay	All Events
1st place	2	7	2	3	1	2	1	–	18	2	11	31
2nd place	1	3	3	–	–	–	1	–	8	–	5	13
3rd place	2	4	–	–	–	1	–	–	7	1	6	14
Podiums	5	14	5	3	1	3	2	–	33	3	22	58
Top 10	13	28	15	6	2	10	7	–	81	11	32	124
Points	19	45	22	10	2	14	13	–	125	14	33	172
Others	5	7	1	–	–	3	19	–	35	–	–	35
DSQ	1	5	–	1	–	1	1	2	11	–	1	12
Starts	25	57	23	11	2	18	33	2	171	14	34	219

a. ^{1} Classification is made according to FIS classification.
b. ^{1} ^{2} ^{3} ^{4} ^{5} Includes individual and mass start races.
c. ^{1} Includes pursuit and double pursuit races.

== See also ==
- Cross-country skiing at the 1998 Winter Olympics
- Cross-country skiing at the 2002 Winter Olympics
- Cross-country skiing at the 2006 Winter Olympics
