= Olga Zavyalova =

Russian cross-country skier

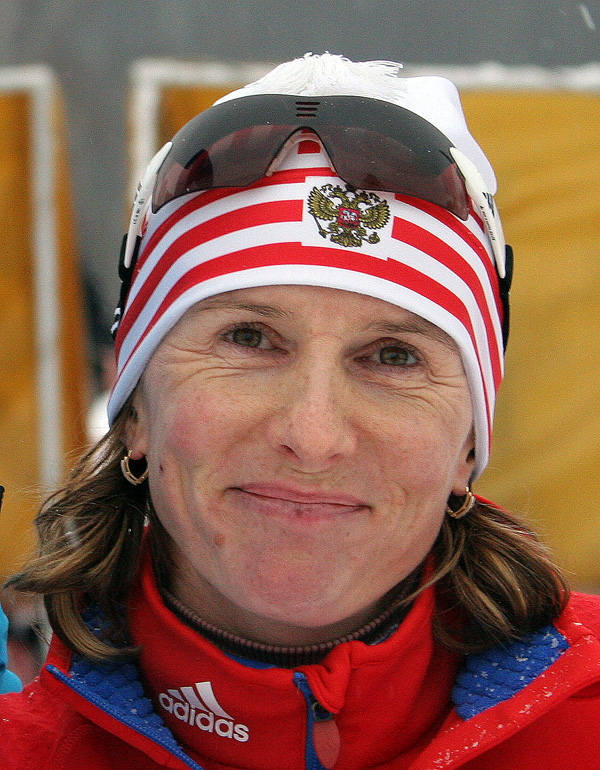
- Zavyalova in 2008

Personal information
- Full name: Olga Viktorovna Zavyalova
- Nationality: Russia
- Born: 24 August 1972 (age 54) Leningrad, Soviet Union

Sport
- Sport: Skiing

World Cup career
- Seasons: 17 – (1993–1998, 2000–2007, 2009–2011)
- Indiv. starts: 203
- Indiv. podiums: 15
- Indiv. wins: 1
- Team starts: 41
- Team podiums: 23
- Team wins: 7
- Overall titles: 0 – (5th in 1995, 2001)
- Discipline titles: 0
Medal record
Women's cross-country skiing
Representing Russia
World Championships
Gold medal – first place	2003 Val di Fiemme	30 km freestyle
Gold medal – first place	2007 Sapporo	7.5 km + 7.5 km double pursuit
Silver medal – second place	2007 Sapporo	10 km freestyle
Bronze medal – third place	2003 Val di Fiemme	5 km + 5 km double pursuit
Bronze medal – third place	2003 Val di Fiemme	15 km classical
Bronze medal – third place	2003 Val di Fiemme	4 × 5 km relay
Junior World Championships
Representing Russia
Gold medal – first place	1992 Vuokatti	15 km freestyle
Representing Soviet Union
Silver medal – second place	1991 Reit im Winkl	4 × 5 km relay

Olga Viktorovna Zavyalova (Russian: О́льга Викторовна Завья́лова), née Korneyeva (born 24 August 1972 in Leningrad) is a Russian cross-country skier who competed from 1993 to 2010. She won six medals at the FIS Nordic World Ski Championships with two gold (30 km: 2003, 7.5 km + 7.5 km double pursuit: 2007), one silver (10 km: 2007), and three bronzes (5 km + 5 km double pursuit, 15 km, and 4 × 5 km relay: all in 2003).

Zavyalova's best individual finish at the Winter Olympics was seventh in the 7.5 km + 7.5 km double pursuit in Turin in 2006. She has twelve additional individual victories at distances up to 30 km from 1996 to 2006.

Zayalova took the 2007-08 season off due to pregnancy, but returned for the 2008-09 season.

Since her retirement after the 2010 Winter Olympics, Zayalova has been acting as a sports ambassador for the 2014 Winter Olympics in Sochi.

== Cross-country skiing results ==
All results are sourced from the International Ski Federation (FIS).

=== Olympic Games ===
Year	Age	10 km	15 km	Pursuit	30 km	Sprint	4 × 5 km relay	Team sprint
2002	29	—	11	—	19	—	—	—N/a
2006	33	24	—N/a	7	9	—	—	—
2010	37	12	—N/a	12	22	—	7	—

=== World Championships ===
- 6 medals – (2 gold, 1 silver, 3 bronze)

Year	Age	5 km	10 km	15 km	Pursuit	30 km	Sprint	4 × 5 km relay	Team sprint
1993	20	18	—N/a	—	16	—	—N/a	—	—N/a
1995	22	27	—N/a	—	9	—	—N/a	—	—N/a
2001	28	—N/a	10	—	—	CNX^{[a]}	—	—	—N/a
2003	30	—N/a	5	Bronze	Bronze	Gold	—	Bronze	—N/a
2005	32	—N/a	6	—N/a	17	9	32	—	—
2007	34	—N/a	Silver	—N/a	Gold	8	—	7	—
2009	36	—N/a	—	—N/a	33	13	—	—	—

a. ^{1} Cancelled due to extremely cold weather.

=== World Cup ===
==== Season standings ====
Season	Age	Discipline standings					Ski Tour standings		
Season	Age	Overall	Distance	Long Distance	Middle Distance	Sprint	Nordic Opening	Tour de Ski	World Cup Final
1993	20	23	—N/a	—N/a	—N/a	—N/a	—N/a	—N/a	—N/a
1994	21	24	—N/a	—N/a	—N/a	—N/a	—N/a	—N/a	—N/a
1995	22	5	—N/a	—N/a	—N/a	—N/a	—N/a	—N/a	—N/a
1996	23	11	—N/a	—N/a	—N/a	—N/a	—N/a	—N/a	—N/a
1997	24	23	—N/a	16	—N/a	18	—N/a	—N/a	—N/a
1998	25	25	—N/a	21	—N/a	24	—N/a	—N/a	—N/a
2000	27	11	—N/a	9	13	13	—N/a	—N/a	—N/a
2001	28	5	—N/a	—N/a	—N/a	28	—N/a	—N/a	—N/a
2002	29	12	—N/a	—N/a	—N/a	44	—N/a	—N/a	—N/a
2003	30	11	—N/a	—N/a	—N/a	45	—N/a	—N/a	—N/a
2004	31	8	5	—N/a	—N/a	36	—N/a	—N/a	—N/a
2005	32	30	20	—N/a	—N/a	51	—N/a	—N/a	—N/a
2006	33	38	25	—N/a	—N/a	—	—N/a	—N/a	—N/a
2007	34	12	7	—N/a	—N/a	NC	—N/a	14	—N/a
2009	35	35	26	—N/a	—N/a	87	—N/a	21	22
2010	36	11	15	—N/a	—N/a	64	—N/a	7	11
2011	37	76	52	—N/a	—N/a	—	—	—	—

==== Individual podiums ====
- 1 victory – (1 WC)
- 15 podiums – (14 WC, 1 SWC)

No.	Season	Date	Location	Race	Level	Place
1	1994–95	17 December 1994	Sappada, Italy	15 km Individual F	World Cup	2nd
2	1994–95	20 December 1994	Sappada, Italy	5 km Individual F	World Cup	3rd
3	2000–01	10 March 2001	Oslo, Norway	30 km Individual C	World Cup	3rd
4	2000–01	17 March 2001	Falun, Sweden	10 km Individual F	World Cup	3rd
5	2000–01	24 March 2001	Kuopio, Finland	40 km Mass Start F	World Cup	2nd
6	2002–03	15 February 2003	Asiago, Italy	5 km Individual C	World Cup	3rd
7	2002–03	16 March 2003	Lahti, Finland	10 km Individual F	World Cup	2nd
8	2002–03	22 March 2003	Falun, Sweden	5 km + 5 km Skiathlon C/F	World Cup	3rd
9	2003–04	29 November 2003	Rukatunturi, Finland	7.5 km + 7.5 km Skiathlon C/F	World Cup	2nd
10	2003–04	14 February 2004	Oberstdorf, Germany	7.5 km + 7.5 km Skiathlon C/F	World Cup	3rd
11	2003–04	7 March 2004	Lahti, Finland	10 km Individual C	World Cup	3rd
12	2004–05	12 February 2005	Reit im Winkl, Germany	10 km Individual F	World Cup	1st
13	2006–07	2 January 2007	Oberstdorf, Germany	5 km + 5 km Skiathlon C/F	Stage World Cup	3rd
14	2006–07	3 February 2007	Davos, Switzerland	10 km Individual F	World Cup	2nd
15	2006–07	11 March 2007	Lahti, Finland	10 km Individual C	World Cup	2nd

==== Team podiums ====
- 7 victories – (6 RL, 1 TS)
- 23 podiums – (19 RL, 4 TS)

No.	Season	Date	Location	Race	Level	Place	Teammate(s)
1	1994–95	29 January 1995	Lahti, Finland	4 × 5 km Relay F	World Cup	1st	Gavrylyuk / Lazutina / Välbe
2	1994–95	12 February 1995	Oslo, Norway	4 × 5 km Relay C/F	World Cup	3rd	Baranova-Masalkina / Shalina / Martynova
3	1995–96	17 December 1995	Santa Caterina, Italy	4 × 5 km Relay C	World Cup	3rd	Nageykina / Chepalova / Baranova-Masalkina
4	1995–96	3 February 1996	Seefeld, Austria	6 × 1.5 km Team Sprint F	World Cup	3rd	Välbe
5	1995–96	17 March 1996	Oslo, Norway	4 × 5 km Relay C/F	World Cup	1st	Nageykina / Lazutina / Gavrylyuk
6	1996–97	24 November 1996	Kiruna, Sweden	4 × 5 km Relay C	World Cup	3rd	Nageykina / Chepalova / Danilova
7	1996–97	15 December 1996	Brusson, Italy	4 × 5 km Relay F	World Cup	2nd	Nageykina / Lazutina / Chepalova
8	1997–98	7 December 1997	Santa Caterina, Italy	4 × 5 km Relay F	World Cup	2nd	Baranova-Masalkina / Nageykina / Gavrylyuk
9	1997–98	14 December 1997	Val di Fiemme, Italy	4 × 5 km Relay F	World Cup	3rd	Baranova-Masalkina / Chepalova / Gavrylyuk
10	1997–98	6 March 1998	Lahti, Finland	4 × 5 km Relay C/F	World Cup	3rd	Nageykina / Baranova-Masalkina / Skladneva
11	1999–00	13 January 2000	Nové Město, Czech Republic	4 × 5 km Relay C/F	World Cup	2nd	Gavrylyuk / Skladneva / Chepalova
12	1999–00	27 February 2000	Falun, Sweden	4 × 5 km Relay F	World Cup	1st	Danilova / Lazutina / Chepalova
13	1999–00	4 March 2000	Lahti, Finland	4 × 5 km Relay C/F	World Cup	1st	Danilova / Gavrylyuk / Chepalova
14	2000–01	9 December 2000	Santa Caterina, Italy	4 × 3 km Relay C/F	World Cup	1st	Gavrylyuk / Lazutina / Chepalova
15	2000–01	13 December 2000	Clusone, Italy	6 × 1.5 km Team Sprint F	World Cup	1st	Chepalova
16	2001–02	27 November 2001	Kuopio, Finland	4 × 5 km Relay C/F	World Cup	2nd	Sidko / Yegorova / Burukhina
17	2001–02	3 March 2002	Lahti, Finland	4 × 1.5 km Team Sprint F	World Cup	2nd	Gavrylyuk
18	2002–03	8 December 2002	Davos, Switzerland	4 × 5 km Relay C/F	World Cup	2nd	Vasilyeva / Medvedeva-Arbuzova / Gavrylyuk
19	2003–04	23 November 2003	Beitostølen, Norway	4 × 5 km Relay C/F	World Cup	3rd	Hahina / Sidko / Vorontsova
20	2003–04	14 December 2003	Davos, Switzerland	4 × 5 km Relay C/F	World Cup	2nd	Kurkina / Vasilyeva / Vorontsova
21	2003–04	7 February 2004	La Clusaz, France	4 × 5 km Relay C/F	World Cup	1st	Kurkina / Vasilyeva / Vorontsova
22	2003–04	22 February 2004	Umeå, Sweden	4 × 5 km Relay C/F	World Cup	2nd	Kurkina / Vorontsova / Chepalova
23	2003–04	6 March 2004	Lahti, Finland	6 × 1.0 km Team Sprint C	World Cup	3rd	Kurkina
