= Yelena Shalina =

Russian cross-country skier

Personal information
- Nationality: Russia
- Born: 22 September 1969 (age 56) Barnaul, Soviet Union

Sport
- Sport: Skiing

World Cup career
- Seasons: 5 – (1992–1996)
- Indiv. starts: 17
- Indiv. podiums: 0
- Team starts: 2
- Team podiums: 2
- Team wins: 0
- Overall titles: 0 – (21st in 1995)
- Discipline titles: 0

Yelena Alekseyevna Shalina (Russian: Елена Алексеевна Шалина; born 22 September 1969 in Barnaul, Soviet Union), is a former Russian cross-country skier who competed from 1992 to 1996. Her best World Cup finish was seventh on three occasions (30 km in Russia: 1993, 5 km and 15 km in Italy: both in 1994).

== Cross-country skiing results ==
All results are sourced from the International Ski Federation (FIS).

=== World Cup ===
==== Season standings ====
Season	Age	Overall
1992	22	45
1993	23	31
1994	24	37
1995	25	21
1996	26	NC

==== Team podiums ====
- 2 podiums

No.	Season	Date	Location	Race	Level	Place	Teammates
1	1994–95	29 January 1995	Lahti, Finland	4 × 5 km Relay F	World Cup	2nd	Zamorozova / Martynova / Danilova
2	1994–95	12 February 1995	Oslo, Norway	4 × 5 km Relay C/F	World Cup	3rd	Baranova-Masalkina / Zavyalova / Martynova
