= Virpi Niemi =

Finnish cross-country skier

Personal information
- Nationality: Finland
- Born: 8 April 1966 (age 60)

Sport
- Sport: Skiing
- Club: Jämin Jänne

World Cup career
- Seasons: 3 – (1987, 1993, 1995)
- Indiv. starts: 9
- Indiv. podiums: 0
- Team starts: 2
- Team podiums: 0
- Overall titles: 0 – (53rd in 1995)

Virpi Niemi (née Ranne, born April 8, 1966) is a Finnish cross-country skier who competed in 1995. Her best World Cup finish was 26th in a 15 km event in Japan that same year.

At the 1995 FIS Nordic World Ski Championships in Thunder Bay, Niemi finished 19th in the 5 km, 24th in the 30 km, 26th in the 15 km, and 31st in the 5 km + 10 km combined pursuit events.

== Cross-country skiing results ==
All results are sourced from the International Ski Federation (FIS).

=== World Championships ===
Year	Age	5 km	15 km	Pursuit	30 km	4 × 5 km relay
1995	28	19	—	31	24	—

=== World Cup ===
==== Season standings ====
Season	Age	Overall
1987	20	NC
1993	26	NC
1995	28	53
