= Natalya Martynova =

Russian cross-country skier

Personal information
- Nationality: Russia
- Born: 19 November 1970 (age 55) Irkutsk, Soviet Union

Sport
- Sport: Skiing

World Cup career
- Seasons: 6 – (1992–1996, 1998)
- Indiv. starts: 20
- Indiv. podiums: 1
- Indiv. wins: 0
- Team starts: 3
- Team podiums: 3
- Team wins: 1
- Overall titles: 0 – (16th in 1995)
- Discipline titles: 0

Natalya Martynova (born 19 November 1970, in Irkutsk) is a Russian cross-country skier who competed from 1994 to 1998. Her best World Cup finish was third in a 15 km event in Norway in 1994. She also competed at the 1992 Winter Olympics and the 1994 Winter Olympics.

At the 1994 Winter Olympics in Lillehammer, Martynova finished 23rd in the 30 km event. She finished 28th in the 15 km event at the FIS Nordic World Ski Championships 1995 in Thunder Bay, Ontario.

== Cross-country skiing results ==
All results are sourced from the International Ski Federation (FIS).

=== Olympic Games ===
Year	Age	5 km	15 km	Pursuit	30 km	4 × 5 km relay
1992	21	—	12	—	—	—
1994	23	—	—	—	23	—

=== World Championships ===
Year	Age	5 km	15 km	Pursuit	30 km	4 × 5 km relay
1995	24	—	28	—	—	—

=== World Cup ===
==== Season standings ====
Season	Age			
Season	Age	Overall	Long Distance	Sprint
1992	21	40	—N/a	—N/a
1993	22	53	—N/a	—N/a
1994	23	18	—N/a	—N/a
1995	24	16	—N/a	—N/a
1996	25	51	—N/a	—N/a
1998	27	48	—	38

==== Individual podiums ====
- 1 podium

No.	Season	Date	Location	Race	Level	Place
1	1993–94	15 January 1994	Oslo, Norway	15 km Individual F	World Cup	3rd

==== Team podiums ====
- 1 victory
- 3 podiums

No.	Season	Date	Location	Race	Level	Place	Teammates
1	1994–95	29 January 1995	Lahti, Finland	4 × 5 km Relay F	World Cup	2nd	Zamorozova / Shalina / Danilova
2	1994–95	12 February 1995	Oslo, Norway	4 × 5 km Relay C/F	World Cup	3rd	Baranova-Masalkina / Shalina / Zavyalova
3	1994–95	26 March 1995	Sapporo, Japan	4 × 5 km Relay C/F	World Cup	1st	Gavrylyuk / Lazutina / Välbe
