= Natalya Baranova-Masalkina =

Russian cross-country skier

Personal information
- Nationality: Russia
- Born: 25 February 1975 (age 51) Krivosheino, Tomsk Oblast

Sport
- Sport: Skiing

World Cup career
- Seasons: 8 – (1995–1999, 2002, 2005–2006)
- Indiv. starts: 85
- Indiv. podiums: 3
- Indiv. wins: 0
- Team starts: 25
- Team podiums: 14
- Team wins: 4
- Overall titles: 0 – (9th in 2005)
- Discipline titles: 0
Medal record
Women's cross-country skiing
Representing Russia
Olympic Games
Gold medal – first place	2006 Turin	4 × 5 km relay
World Championships
Silver medal – second place	2005 Oberstdorf	4 × 5 km relay
Bronze medal – third place	2005 Oberstdorf	30 km classical
Junior World Championships
Gold medal – first place	1993 Harrachov	4 × 5 km relay
Gold medal – first place	1995 Gällivare	5 km classical
Gold medal – first place	1995 Gällivare	4 × 5 km relay
Bronze medal – third place	1995 Gällivare	15 km freestyle

Natalya Ivanovna Baranova-Masalkina (Russian: Наталья Ивановна Баранова-Масалкина); born 25 February 1975 in Krivosheino, Tomsk Oblast) is a former Russian cross-country skier who has competed from 1994 to 2006. She won a gold medal in the 4 × 5 km relay at the 2006 Winter Olympics in Turin.

Baranova-Masalkina won two medals at the 2005 FIS Nordic World Ski Championships with a silver in the 4 × 5 km relay and a bronze in the 30 km. She also has three individual victories at various levels from 1995 to 2004.

== Doping case ==
Baranova-Masalkina tested positive for EPO in a WADA pre-Games control for the 2002 Winter Olympics. She was ejected from the Olympic village after the positive was announced, and was subsequently handed a two-year ban from sports by the International Ski Federation.

== Cross-country skiing results ==
All results are sourced from the International Ski Federation (FIS).

=== Olympic Games ===
- 1 medal – (1 gold)

Year	Age	10 km individual	15 km skiathlon	30 km mass start	Sprint	4 × 5 km relay	Team sprint
2006	31	16	—	—	—	Gold	—

=== World Championships ===
- 2 medals – (1 silver, 1 bronze)

Year	Age	5 km	10 km	15 km	Pursuit	30 km	Sprint	4 × 5 km relay	Team sprint
1999	24	—	—N/a	—	—	8	—N/a	—	—N/a
2005	30	—N/a	5	—N/a	6	Bronze	—	Silver	—

=== World Cup ===
==== Season standings ====
Season	Age				
Season	Age	Overall	Distance	Long Distance	Sprint
1995	20	31	—N/a	—N/a	—N/a
1996	21	16	—N/a	—N/a	—N/a
1997	22	28	—N/a	NC	32
1998	23	18	—N/a	26	17
1999	24	13	—N/a	12	18
2002	27	20	—N/a	—N/a	57
2005	30	9	5	—N/a	36
2006	31	26	18	—N/a	80

==== Individual podiums ====
- 3 podiums

No.	Season	Date	Location	Race	Level	Place
1	1998–99	13 March 1999	Falun, Sweden	15 km Individual C	World Cup	3rd
2	2004–05	26 November 2004	Rukatunturi, Finland	10 km Individual F	World Cup	3rd
3	2005–06	19 November 2005	Beitostølen, Norway	10 km Individual C	World Cup	3rd

==== Team podiums ====
- 4 victories
- 14 podiums

No.	Season	Date	Location	Race	Level	Place	Teammates
1	1994–95	12 February 1995	Oslo, Norway	4 × 5 km Relay C/F	World Cup	3rd	Shalina / Zavyalova / Martynova
2	1995–96	17 December 1995	Santa Caterina, Italy	4 × 5 km Relay C	World Cup	3rd	Nageykina / Chepalova / Zavyalova
3	1996–97	8 December 1996	Davos, Switzerland	4 × 5 km Relay C	World Cup	3rd	Nageykina / Chepalova / Danilova
4	1997–98	23 November 1997	Beitostølen, Norway	4 × 5 km Relay C	World Cup	1st	Danilova / Gavrylyuk / Lazutina
5	1997–98	7 December 1997	Santa Caterina, Italy	4 × 5 km Relay F	World Cup	2nd	Zavyalova / Nageykina / Gavrylyuk
6	1997–98	14 December 1997	Val di Fiemme, Italy	4 × 5 km Relay F	World Cup	3rd	Zavyalova / Chepalova / Gavrylyuk
7	1997–98	6 March 1998	Lahti, Finland	4 × 5 km Relay C/F	World Cup	3rd	Nageykina / Zavyalova / Skladneva
8	1998–99	20 December 1998	Davos, Switzerland	4 × 5 km Relay C/F	World Cup	3rd	Denisova / Chepalova / Reztsova
9	1998–99	14 March 1999	Falun, Sweden	4 × 5 km Relay C/F	World Cup	1st	Nageykina / Chepalova / Lazutina
10	1998–99	21 March 1999	Oslo, Norway	4 × 5 km Relay C	World Cup	2nd	Yegorova / Reztsova / Skladneva
11	2001–02	27 November 2001	Kuopio, Finland	4 × 5 km Relay C/F	World Cup	1st	Danilova / Gavrylyuk / Chepalova
12	2004–05	12 December 2004	Val di Fiemme, Italy	4 × 5 km Relay C/F	World Cup	1st	Kurkina / Medvedeva-Arbuzova / Chepalova
13	2004–05	20 March 2005	Falun, Sweden	4 × 5 km Relay C/F	World Cup	3rd	Kurkina / Medvedeva-Arbuzova / Chepalova
14	2005–06	15 January 2006	Val di Fiemme, Italy	4 × 5 km Relay C/F	World Cup	2nd	Rocheva / Medvedeva-Arbuzova / Chepalova
