= Kari Uglem =

Norwegian cross-country skier

Personal information
- Nationality: Norway
- Born: May 16, 1970 (age 56)

Sport
- Sport: Skiing
- Club: Strindheim IL

World Cup career
- Seasons: 4 – (1993–1996)
- Indiv. starts: 16
- Indiv. podiums: 0
- Team starts: 2
- Team podiums: 1
- Team wins: 0
- Overall titles: 0 – (42nd in 1995)

Kari Uglem (born 16 May 1970) is a retired Norwegian cross-country skier.

In the World Cup she finished once among the top 10, with a tenth place from Lahti in January 1995. She made her debut in January 1993 and competed in her last World Cup race in January 1996.

She also competed on national level in middle distance running, winning the Norwegian championships in 800 metres in 1992 and 1996. Her personal best time was 2:04.36 minutes, achieved in August 1992 in Mosjøen.

As a cross-country skier she represented Strindheim IL. As a runner she represented Strindheim IL and later Oppdal FIK.

== Cross-country skiing results ==
All results are sourced from the International Ski Federation (FIS).

=== World Cup ===
==== Season standings ====
Season	Age	Overall
1993	22	NC
1994	23	52
1995	24	42
1996	25	66

==== Team podiums ====
- 1 podium

No.	Season	Date	Location	Race	Level	Place	Teammates
1	1994–95	15 January 1995	Nové Město, Czech Republic	4 × 5 km Relay C	World Cup	2nd	Nybråten / Wold / Sorkmo
