= Lyubov Yegorova (cross-country skier) =

Russian cross-country skier (born 1966)

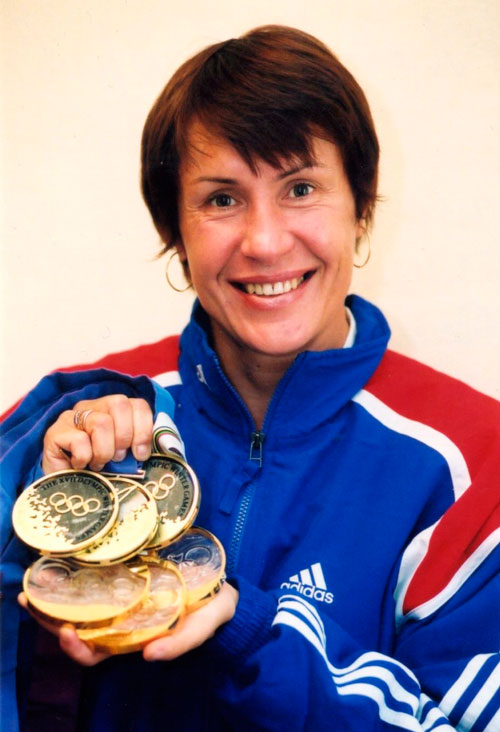
- Lyubov Yegorova

Personal information
- Full name: Lyubov Ivanovna Yegorova
- Nationality: Russia
- Born: 5 May 1966 (age 60) Seversk, Russian SFSR, Soviet Union

Sport
- Sport: Skiing

World Cup career
- Seasons: 15 – (1984, 1988–1994, 1996–1997, 1999–2003)
- Indiv. starts: 119
- Indiv. podiums: 41
- Indiv. wins: 13
- Team starts: 26
- Team podiums: 21
- Team wins: 12
- Overall titles: 1 – (1993)
- Discipline titles: 0
Medal record
Women's cross-country skiing
Olympic Games
Representing Unified Team
Gold medal – first place	1992 Albertville	10 km pursuit
Gold medal – first place	1992 Albertville	15 km classical
Gold medal – first place	1992 Albertville	4 × 5 km relay
Silver medal – second place	1992 Albertville	5 km classical
Silver medal – second place	1992 Albertville	30 km freestyle
Representing Russia
Gold medal – first place	1994 Lillehammer	5 km classical
Gold medal – first place	1994 Lillehammer	10 km pursuit
Gold medal – first place	1994 Lillehammer	4 × 5 km relay
Silver medal – second place	1994 Lillehammer	15 km freestyle
World Championships
Representing Soviet Union
Gold medal – first place	1991 Val di Fiemme	30 km freestyle
Gold medal – first place	1991 Val di Fiemme	4 × 5 km relay
Representing Russia
Gold medal – first place	1993 Falun	4 × 5 km relay
Silver medal – second place	1993 Falun	5 km classical
Bronze medal – third place	1993 Falun	10 km pursuit
Bronze medal – third place	1993 Falun	30 km freestyle
Disqualified	1997 Trondheim	5 km classical
Junior World Championships
Representing Soviet Union
Gold medal – first place	1985 Täsch	3 × 5 km relay
Gold medal – first place	1986 Lake Placid	5 km
Silver medal – second place	1986 Lake Placid	15 km
Silver medal – second place	1986 Lake Placid	3 × 5 km relay

Lyubov Ivanovna Yegorova (Russian: Любо́вь Ива́новна Его́рова; born 5 May 1966), name also spelled Ljubov Jegorova, is a Russian former cross-country Olympic ski champion, multiple world champion (first time in 1991), winner of the World Cup (1993) and Hero of Russia. Lyubov Yegorova is an honorary citizen of Seversk (1992), Saint Petersburg (1994), and Tomsk Oblast (2005).

== Career ==
Yegorova won several medals at the FIS Nordic World Ski Championships with three golds (4 × 5 km relay: 1991, 1993; 30 km: 1991), one silver (5 km: 1993), and two bronzes (5 km + 10 km combined pursuit, 30 km: 1993).

She also won the women's 15 km event at the Holmenkollen ski festival in 1994.

Additionally, Yegorova won a total of nine medals at the Winter Olympics, earning six golds and three silver.

She was the most successful athlete at both the 1992 and 1994 Winter Olympics. She won the Holmenkollen medal in 1994 (shared with Vladimir Smirnov and Espen Bredesen).

=== Doping case ===
Yegorova decided to retire after the 1997 FIS Nordic World Ski Championships in Trondheim when she was disqualified for doping on bromantan, a stimulant drug. She was disqualified on 26 February 1997, three days after winning gold in the women's 5 km event, and stripped of that medal.

=== Return ===
She returned after the suspension to compete at the 2002 Winter Olympics but did not win a medal there.

== Cross-country skiing results ==
All results are sourced from the International Ski Federation (FIS).

=== Olympic Games ===
- 9 medals – (6 gold, 3 silver)

Year	Age	5 km	10 km	15 km	Pursuit	30 km	Sprint	4 × 5 km relay
1992	25	Silver	—N/a	Gold	Gold	Silver	—N/a	Gold
1994	27	Gold	—N/a	Silver	Gold	5	—N/a	Gold
2002	35	—N/a	5	—	—	—	11	—

=== World Championships ===
- 6 medals – (3 gold, 1 silver, 2 bronze)

Year	Age	5 km	10 km	15 km	Pursuit	30 km	4 × 5 km relay
1991	24	4	8	11	—N/a	Gold	Gold
1993	26	Silver	—N/a	15	Bronze	Bronze	Gold
1997	30	DSQ	—N/a	6	DNS	—	—

=== World Cup ===
==== Season titles ====
- 1 titles – (1 overall)

Season
Season	Discipline
1993	Overall

==== Season standings ====
Season	Age				
Season	Age	Overall	Long Distance	Middle Distance	Sprint
1984	17	45	—N/a	—N/a	—N/a
1988	21	29	—N/a	—N/a	—N/a
1989	22	42	—N/a	—N/a	—N/a
1990	23	6	—N/a	—N/a	—N/a
1991	24	3rd place, bronze medalist(s)	—N/a	—N/a	—N/a
1992	25	3rd place, bronze medalist(s)	—N/a	—N/a	—N/a
1993	26	1st place, gold medalist(s)	—N/a	—N/a	—N/a
1994	27	2nd place, silver medalist(s)	—N/a	—N/a	—N/a
1996	29	5	—N/a	—N/a	—N/a
1997	30	10	9	—N/a	9
1999	32	41	36	—N/a	54
2000	33	14	14	11	39
2001	34	22	—N/a	—N/a	26
2002	35	17	—N/a	—N/a	21
2003	36	34	—N/a	—N/a	44

==== Individual podiums ====
- 13 victories
- 41 podiums

No.	Season	Date	Location	Race	Level	Place
1	1989–90	20 February 1990	Val di Fiemme, Italy	10 km Individual F	World Cup	2nd
2	1989–90	25 February 1990	(Socialist Federal Republic of Yugoslavia) Bohinj, Yugoslavia	10 km Individual C	World Cup	2nd
3	1989–90	17 March 1990	Vang, Norway	10 km + 10 km Pursuit C/F	World Cup	3rd
4	1990–91	15 December 1990	Davos, Switzerland	10 km Individual C	World Cup	2nd
5	1990–91	20 December 1990	Les Saisies, France	5 km + 10 km Pursuit C/F	World Cup	3rd
6	1990–91	16 February 1991	Val di Fiemme, Italy	30 km Individual F	World Championships^{[1]}	1st
7	1990–91	2 March 1991	Lahti, Finland	15 km Individual F	World Cup	3rd
8	1990–91	9 March 1991	Falun, Sweden	15 km Individual F	World Cup	3rd
9	1991–92	8 December 1991	Silver Star, Canada	15 km Individual C	World Cup	3rd
10	1991–92	14 December 1991	Thunder Bay, Canada	5 km Individual F	World Cup	2nd
11	1991–92	9 February 1992	Albertville, France	15 km Individual C	Olympic Games^{[1]}	1st
12	1991–92	13 February 1992	Albertville, France	5 km Individual C	Olympic Games^{[1]}	2nd
13	1991–92	15 February 1992	Albertville, France	10 km Pursuit F	Olympic Games^{[1]}	1st
14	1991–92	21 February 1992	Albertville, France	30 km Individual F	Olympic Games^{[1]}	2nd
15	1991–92	7 March 1992	Funäsdalen, Sweden	5 km Individual C	World Cup	3rd
16	1991–92	14 March 1992	Vang, Norway	15 km Individual F	World Cup	2nd
17	1992–93	18 December 1992	Val di Fiemme, Italy	15 km Individual F	World Cup	1st
18	1992–93	3 January 1993	Kavgolovo, Russia	30 km individual C	World Cup	1st
19	1992–93	16 January 1993	Cogne, Italy	10 km Individual F	World Cup	3rd
20	1992–93	21 February 1993	Falun, Sweden	5 km Individual C	World Championships^{[1]}	2nd
21	1992–93	23 February 1993	Falun, Sweden	10 km Pursuit F	World Championships^{[1]}	3rd
22	1992–93	27 February 1993	Falun, Sweden	30 km Individual F	World Championships^{[1]}	3rd
23	1992–93	6 March 1993	Lahti, Finland	5 km Individual F	World Cup	1st
24	1992–93	9 March 1993	Lillehammer, Norway	5 km Individual C	World Cup	2nd
25	1992–93	10 March 1993	Lillehammer, Norway	10 km Pursuit F	World Cup	1st
26	1992–93	19 March 1993	Štrbské Pleso, Slovakia	10 km Individual C	World Cup	2nd
27	1993–94	11 December 1993	Santa Caterina, Italy	5 km Individual C	World Cup	2nd
28	1993–94	21 December 1993	Toblach, Italy	15 km Individual C	World Cup	2nd
29	1993–94	8 January 1994	Kavgolovo, Russia	10 km Individual C	World Cup	1st
30	1993–94	15 January 1994	Oslo, Norway	15 km Individual F	World Cup	1st
31	1993–94	13 February 1994	Lillehammer, Norway	15 km Individual F	Olympic Games^{[1]}	2nd
32	1993–94	15 February 1994	Lillehammer, Norway	5 km Individual C	Olympic Games^{[1]}	1st
33	1993–94	17 February 1994	Lillehammer, Norway	10 km Pursuit F	Olympic Games^{[1]}	1st
34	1993–94	6 March 1994	Lahti, Finland	30 km Individual F	World Cup	2nd
35	1993–94	20 March 1994	Thunder Bay, Canada	10 km Pursuit F	World Cup	3rd
36	1995–96	25 November 1995	Vuokatti, Finland	5 km Individual C	World Cup	1st
37	1995–96	29 November 1995	Gällivare, Sweden	10 km Individual F	World Cup	2nd
38	1995–96	10 December 1995	Davos, Switzerland	10 km Pursuit C	World Cup	1st
39	1995–96	13 December 1995	Brusson, Italy	10 km Individual F	World Cup	2nd
40	1995–96	16 December 1995	Santa Caterina, Italy	10 km Individual C	World Cup	2nd
41	1996–97	5 January 1997	Kavgolovo, Russia	15 km Individual F	World Cup	3rd

==== Team podiums ====
- 12 victories
- 21 podiums

No.	Season	Date	Location	Race	Level	Place	Teammates
1	1989–90	4 March 1990	Lahti, Finland	4 × 5 km Relay F	World Cup	2nd	Nageykina / Smetanina / Lazutina
2	1989–90	11 March 1990	Örnsköldsvik, Sweden	4 × 5 km Relay C/F	World Cup	1st	Lazutina / Tikhonova / Välbe
3	1990–91	15 February 1991	Val di Fiemme, Italy	4 × 5 km Relay C/F	World Championships^{[1]}	1st	Smetanina / Tikhonova / Välbe
4	1990–91	10 March 1991	Falun, Sweden	4 × 5 km Relay C	World Cup	1st	Nageykina / Tikhonova / Välbe
5	1991–92	18 February 1992	Albertville, France	4 × 5 km Relay C/F	Olympic Games^{[1]}	1st	Välbe / Smetanina / Lazutina
6	1991–92	8 March 1992	Funäsdalen, Sweden	4 × 5 km Relay C	World Cup	2nd	Välbe / Lazutina / Nageykina
7	1992–93	26 February 1993	Falun, Sweden	4 × 5 km Relay C/F	World Championships^{[1]}	1st	Välbe / Lazutina / Gavrylyuk
8	1993–94	22 February 1994	Lillehammer, Norway	4 × 5 km Relay C/F	Olympic Games^{[1]}	1st	Välbe / Lazutina / Gavrylyuk
9	1995–96	17 December 1995	Santa Caterina, Italy	4 × 5 km Relay C	World Cup	1st	Lazutina / Gavrylyuk / Välbe
10	1995–96	10 March 1996	Falun, Sweden	4 × 5 km Relay C/F	World Cup	1st	Gavrylyuk / Lazutina / Välbe
11	1996–97	24 November 1996	Kiruna, Sweden	4 × 5 km Relay C	World Cup	1st	Gavrylyuk / Lazutina / Välbe
12	1996–97	8 December 1996	Davos, Switzerland	4 × 5 km Relay C	World Cup	2nd	Gavrylyuk / Lazutina / Välbe
13	1996–97	15 December 1996	Brusson, Italy	4 × 5 km Relay F	World Cup	1st	Gavrylyuk / Danilova / Välbe
14	1998–99	14 March 1999	Falun, Sweden	4 × 5 km Relay C/F	World Cup	2nd	Gavrylyuk / Reztsova / Skladneva
15	1998–99	21 March 1999	Oslo, Norway	4 × 5 km Relay C	World Cup	2nd	Baranova-Masalkina / Reztsova / Skladneva
16	1999–00	28 November 1999	Kiruna, Sweden	4 × 5 km Relay F	World Cup	1st	Skladneva / Reztsova / Chepalova
17	1999–00	13 January 2000	Nové Město, Czech Republic	4 × 5 km Relay C/F	World Cup	1st	Danilova / Nageykina / Lazutina
18	1999–00	27 February 2000	Falun, Sweden	4 × 5 km Relay F	World Cup	2nd	Nageykina / Skladneva / Gavrylyuk
19	1999–00	4 March 2000	Lahti, Finland	4 × 5 km Relay C/F	World Cup	2nd	Denisova / Stchastlivaia / Skladneva
20	2000–01	26 November 2000	Beitostølen, Norway	4 × 5 km Relay C/F	World Cup	2nd	Danilova / Lazutina / Chepalova
21	2001–02	27 November 2001	Kuopio, Finland	4 × 5 km Relay C/F	World Cup	2nd	Sidko / Burukhina / Zavyalova

Note: ^{1} Until the 1999 World Championships and the 1994 Olympics, World Championship and Olympic races were included in the World Cup scoring system.

== Personal life ==
She is the mother of Viktor Sysoyev.

== See also ==
- List of female Heroes of the Russian Federation
- List of multiple Olympic gold medalists
- List of multiple Winter Olympic medalists
