= Grigoriy Gutnikov =

Russian cross-country skier (born 1974)

Grigoriy Gutnikov (Russian: Григорий Гутников; born 5 February 1974) is a Russian cross-country skier who competed internationally from 1994 to 2003. His best World Cup finish was 12th in a 10 km event in Italy in 1994.

At the FIS Nordic World Ski Championships 1997 in Trondheim, Gutnikov finished 26th in the 10 km + 15 km combined pursuit and 31st in the 10 km events.
