= Sappada =

Sappada Plodn (Bavarian)
- Comune
- Comune di Sappada
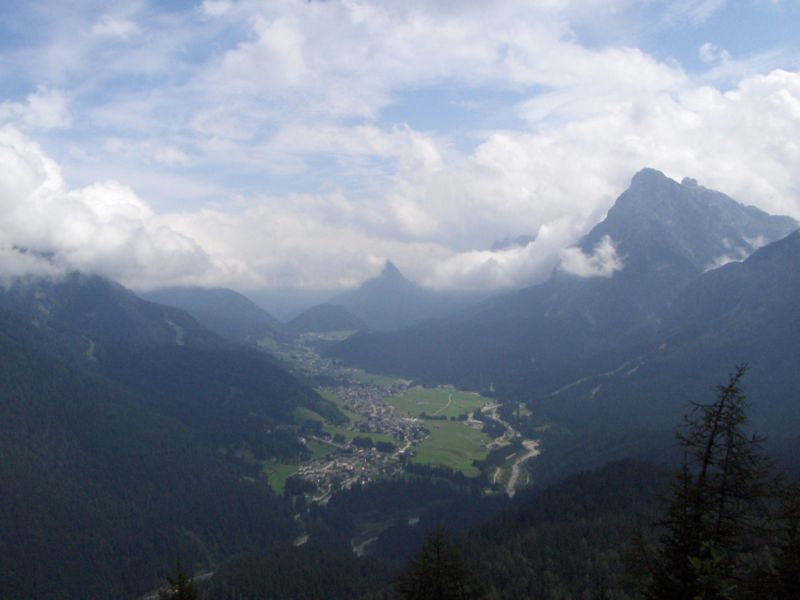

- Location within Italy Location within Friuli-Venezia Giulia
- Coordinates: 46°34′N 12°41′E
- Country: Italy
- Region: Friuli-Venezia Giulia
- Province: Udine (UD)

Government
  - Mayor: Manuel Piller Hoffer

Area
  - Total: 62.6 km^{2} (24.2 sq mi)
- Elevation: 1,250 m (4,100 ft)

Population (30 November 2011)
  - Total: 1,300
  - Density: 21/km^{2} (54/sq mi)
- Demonym: Sappadini
- Time zone: UTC+1 (CET)
  - Summer (DST): UTC+2 (CEST)
- Postal code: 33012
- Dialing code: 0435
- Patron saint: St. Margaret
- Saint day: July 20
- Website: Official website

Sappada (German: Pladen or Bladen; local Southern Bavarian: Plodn; Friulian: Sapade; Ladin: Sapada) is a comune (municipality) in the Regional decentralization entity of Udine, in the Italian region of Friuli-Venezia Giulia. It is one of I Borghi più belli d'Italia ("The most beautiful villages of Italy").

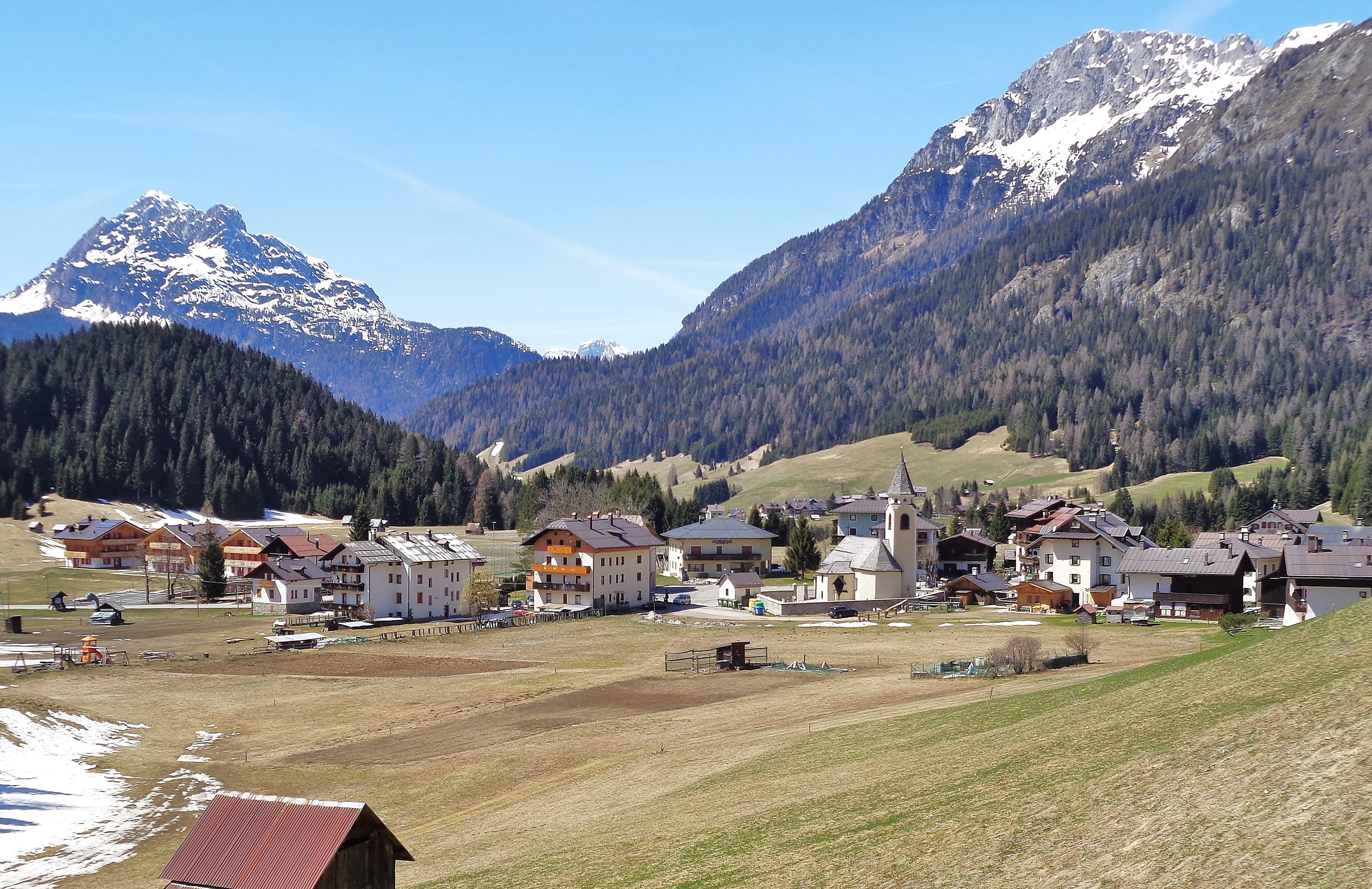
Cima Sappada

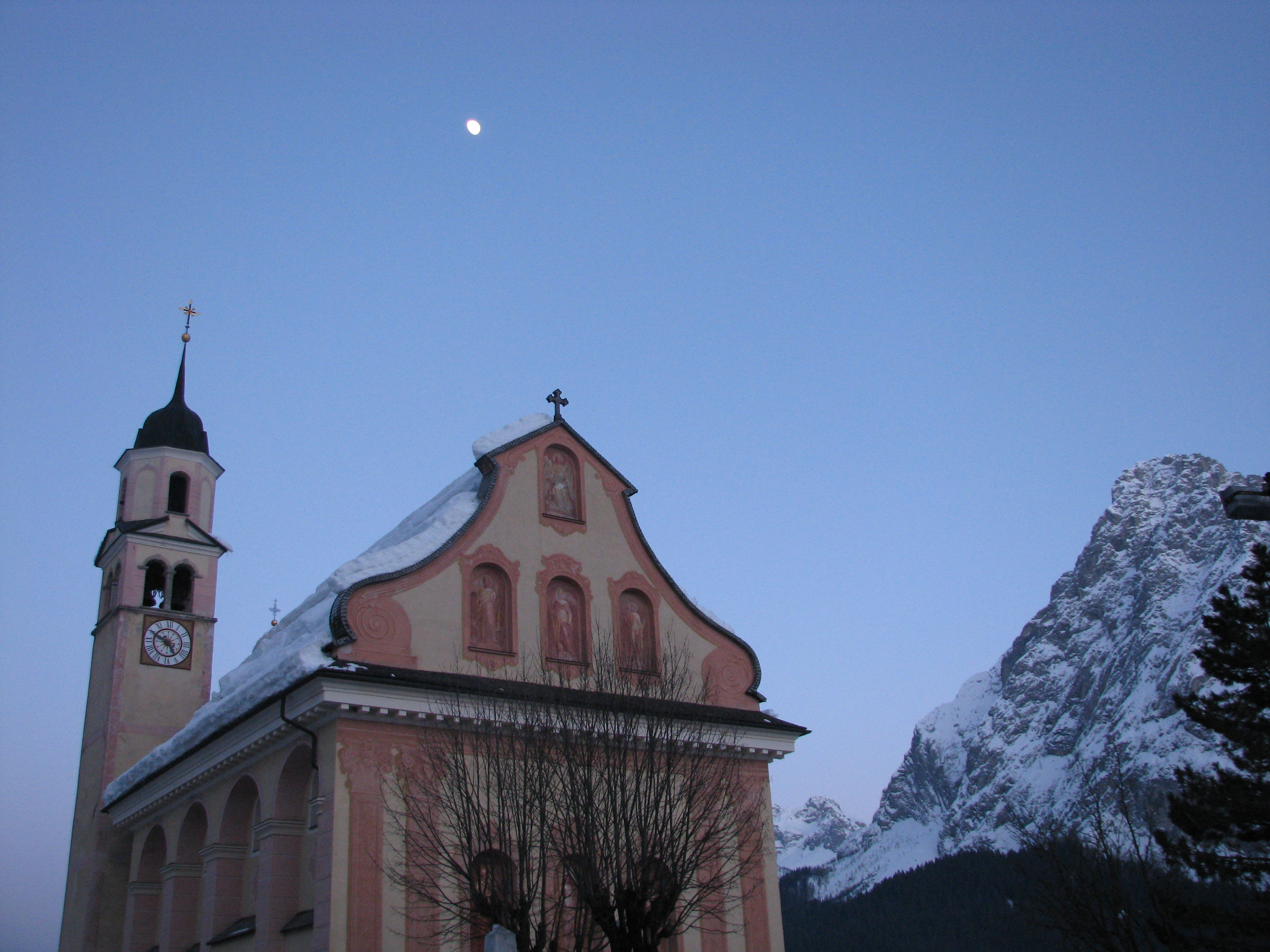
Parish church

== Geography ==
The settlement is situated on the southern slopes of the Peralba mountain, part of the Carnic Alps range, close to the border with Austria. Sappada is located about 130 kilometres (81 mi) north of Venice and about 60 kilometres (37 mi) northeast of Belluno.

Sappada borders the following municipalities: Forni Avoltri, Prato Carnico, Santo Stefano di Cadore, Vigo di Cadore.

== Language ==
Sappada is a German language island in Italy. The local vernacular, Plodarisch or Plodar schproche (sappadino in Italian), is a variety of Puster Valley Tyrolean Bavarian that is closely related to the speech of nearby Sauris (Zahre) in Friuli. It is however not closely related to the Germanic Cimbrian language spoken in other language islands in Trentino and Veneto. The German name of the settlement refers to the Piave (Ploden) river which runs through the valley.

== History ==
The area of Sappada was initially part of the historic Cadore region, which Emperor Otto II ceded to the Bavarian Bishops of Freising in 973. The bishops already held nearby Innichen Abbey in the Puster Valley. At the time, German-speaking settlers, mainly from the Villgraten valley (in present-day East Tyrol), entered the region. King Henry IV, after his Walk to Canossa in January 1077, gave Sappada to the Patriarchs of Aquileia in 1077.

Pladen itself, then part of a larger mining area together with neighbouring Forni Avoltri, was first mentioned in a 1269 deed. With the Friulian lands of Aquileia, it was conquered by Venice and incorporated into the Domini di Terraferma by 1420. Part of the Province of Belluno since 1852, it fell to the Kingdom of Italy in 1866.

Although Sappada was part of the Italian region of Veneto for many years, it was historically part of the Carnia region in Friuli. In 2008, the municipality formally asked to become part of Friuli-Venezia Giulia. According to the Italian constitution, municipalities bordering other regions or provinces have the right to ask for incorporation into the neighboring entities. The municipal council of Sappada took advantage of this possibility and asked the Autonomous Region of Friuli-Venezia Giulia to join it. In September 2010, the Regional council of the latter accepted the municipality's demand. Italian parliament approved the incorporation to Friuli-Venezia Giulia on 22 November 2017.
