= Italy at the 2002 Winter Olympics =

- IOC code: ITA
- NOC: Italian National Olympic Committee
- Website: www.coni.it (in Italian)

in Salt Lake City
- Competitors: 112 (65 men, 47 women) in 12 sports
- Flag bearer: Isolde Kostner (alpine skiing)
- Medals Ranked 7th: Gold 4 Silver 4 Bronze 5 Total 13

Winter Olympics appearances (overview)
- 1924; 1928; 1932; 1936; 1948; 1952; 1956; 1960; 1964; 1968; 1972; 1976; 1980; 1984; 1988; 1992; 1994; 1998; 2002; 2006; 2010; 2014; 2018; 2022; 2026

Italy competed at the 2002 Winter Olympics in Salt Lake City, United States.

With Turin being the host of the 2006 Winter Olympics, an Italian segment featuring singers Irene Grandi and Elisa was presented at the closing ceremony.

== Medalists ==
| Medal | Name | Sport | Event |
|---|---|---|---|
| Gold | Daniela Ceccarelli | Alpine skiing | Women's super-G |
| Gold | Stefania Belmondo | Cross country skiing | Women's 15 km (freestyle, mass start) |
| Gold | Gabriella Paruzzi | Cross country skiing | Women's 30 km (classical style) |
| Gold | Armin Zöggeler | Luge | Men's individual |
| Silver | Isolde Kostner | Alpine skiing | Women's downhill |
| Silver | Giorgio Di Centa; Fabio Maj; Pietro Piller Cottrer; Cristian Zorzi | Cross country skiing | Men's 4 × 10 km relay |
| Silver | Stefania Belmondo | Cross country skiing | Women's 30 km (classical style) |
| Silver | Michele Antonioli; Maurizio Carnino; Fabio Carta; Nicola Franceschina; Nicola Rodigari | Short track speed skating | Men's 5000 m relay |
| Bronze | Karen Putzer | Alpine skiing | Women's super-G |
| Bronze | Cristian Zorzi | Cross country skiing | Men's sprint |
| Bronze | Stefania Belmondo | Cross country skiing | Women's 10 km (classical style) |
| Bronze | Barbara Fusar-Poli; Maurizio Margaglio | Figure skating | Ice dancing |
| Bronze | Lidia Trettel | Snowboarding | Women's parallel giant slalom |

== Alpine skiing ==
Men

| Athlete | Event | Race 1 | Race 2 | Total | |
| Athlete | Event | Time | Time | Time | Rank |
|---|---|---|---|---|---|
| Kristian Ghedina | Downhill | | | 1:42.54 | 35 |
| Kurt Sulzenbacher | Downhill | | | 1:41.56 | 22 |
| Alessandro Fattori | Downhill | | | 1:41.24 | 19 |
| Roland Fischnaller | Downhill | | | 1:40.85 | 17 |
| Alessandro Fattori | Super-G | | | DNF | – |
| Kurt Sulzenbacher | Super-G | | | 1:26.44 | 26 |
| Patrick Staudacher | Super-G | | | 1:23.95 | 18 |
| Roland Fischnaller | Super-G | | | 1:23.87 | 17 |
| Giorgio Rocca | Giant Slalom | 1:14.91 | 1:12.94 | 2:27.85 | 26 |
| Alessandro Roberto | Giant Slalom | 1:14.65 | 1:12.88 | 2:27.53 | 22 |
| Alexander Ploner | Giant Slalom | 1:12.86 | DNF | DNF | – |
| Massimiliano Blardone | Giant Slalom | 1:12.72 | 1:12.15 | 2:24.87 | 8 |
| Alan Perathoner | Slalom | DNF | – | DNF | – |
| Giancarlo Bergamelli | Slalom | DNF | – | DNF | – |
| Edoardo Zardini | Slalom | DNF | – | DNF | – |
| Giorgio Rocca | Slalom | DNF | – | DNF | – |

Men's combined

| Athlete | Downhill | Slalom | | Total | |
| Athlete | Time | Time 1 | Time 2 | Total time | Rank |
|---|---|---|---|---|---|
| Kurt Sulzenbacher | 1:41.49 | DNF | – | DNF | – |
| Alessandro Fattori | 1:40.15 | 50.30 | 55.12 | 3:25.57 | 13 |
| Patrick Staudacher | 1:39.23 | 49.51 | 53.73 | 3:22.47 | 7 |

Women

| Athlete | Event | Race 1 | Race 2 | Total | |
| Athlete | Event | Time | Time | Time | Rank |
|---|---|---|---|---|---|
| Lucia Recchia | Downhill | | | 1:42.80 | 24 |
| Daniela Ceccarelli | Downhill | | | 1:42.03 | 20 |
| Patrizia Bassis | Downhill | | | 1:41.56 | 17 |
| Isolde Kostner | Downhill | | | 1:40.01 | 2nd place, silver medalist(s) |
| Patrizia Bassis | Super-G | | | DNF | – |
| Isolde Kostner | Super-G | | | 1:14.99 | 13 |
| Karen Putzer | Super-G | | | 1:13.86 | 3rd place, bronze medalist(s) |
| Daniela Ceccarelli | Super-G | | | 1:13.59 | 1st place, gold medalist(s) |
| Nicole Gius | Giant Slalom | 1:18.58 | 1:16.96 | 2:35.54 | 19 |
| Silke Bachmann | Giant Slalom | 1:17.92 | 1:16.02 | 2:33.94 | 16 |
| Denise Karbon | Giant Slalom | 1:17.75 | 1:15.81 | 2:33.56 | 14 |
| Karen Putzer | Giant Slalom | 1:17.43 | 1:15.51 | 2:32.94 | 10 |
| Sonia Vierin | Slalom | DNF | – | DNF | – |
| Denise Karbon | Slalom | DNF | – | DNF | – |
| Silke Bachmann | Slalom | 55.69 | 57.25 | 1:52.94 | 18 |
| Nicole Gius | Slalom | 55.57 | 55.44 | 1:51.01 | 10 |

Women's combined

| Athlete | Downhill | Slalom | | Total | |
| Athlete | Time | Time 1 | Time 2 | Total time | Rank |
|---|---|---|---|---|---|
| Patrizia Bassis | 1:16.72 | 52.16 | 49.20 | 2:58.08 | 21 |
| Elena Tagliabue | 1:17.66 | 49.03 | 47.27 | 2:53.96 | 19 |
| Lucia Recchia | 1:17.28 | 48.88 | 46.94 | 2:53.10 | 18 |
| Daniela Ceccarelli | 1:16.75 | 48.35 | 46.71 | 2:51.81 | 15 |

== Biathlon ==
Men

| Event | Athlete | Misses ^{1} | Time | Rank |
|---|---|---|---|---|
| 10 km sprint | Devis Da Canal | 2 | 28:25.9 | 68 |
| 10 km sprint | Wilfried Pallhuber | 1 | 27:35.7 | 50 |
| 10 km sprint | Paolo Longo | 0 | 27:31.9 | 49 |
| 10 km sprint | René Cattarinussi | 1 | 26:37.3 | 22 |
| 12.5 km pursuit ^{2} | Paolo Longo | 1 | 36:38.8 | 37 |
| 12.5 km pursuit ^{2} | Wilfried Pallhuber | 2 | 36:19.7 | 33 |
| 12.5 km pursuit ^{2} | René Cattarinussi | 1 | 35:00.9 | 20 |

| Event | Athlete | Time | Misses | Adjusted time ^{3} | Rank |
|---|---|---|---|---|---|
| 20 km | Rene Laurent Vuillermoz | 54:00.7 | 6 | 1'00:00.7 | 72 |
| 20 km | Wilfried Pallhuber | 52:33.2 | 5 | 57:33.2 | 50 |
| 20 km | Paolo Longo | 55:11.9 | 1 | 56:11.9 | 33 |
| 20 km | René Cattarinussi | 52:57.2 | 2 | 54:57.2 | 21 |

Men's 4 × 7.5 km relay

| Athletes | Race | | |
| Athletes | Misses ^{1} | Time | Rank |
|---|---|---|---|
| Paolo Longo; René Cattarinussi; Devis Da Canal; Wilfried Pallhuber | 5 | 1'30:56.3 | 16 |

Women

| Event | Athlete | Misses ^{1} | Time | Rank |
|---|---|---|---|---|
| 7.5 km sprint | Siegrid Pallhuber | 4 | 26:20.9 | 68 |
| 7.5 km sprint | Michela Ponza | 2 | 23:36.9 | 46 |
| 7.5 km sprint | Nathalie Santer | 3 | 23:14.7 | 40 |
| 7.5 km sprint | Saskia Santer | 2 | 23:11.2 | 36 |
| 10 km pursuit ^{4} | Saskia Santer | 7 | 36:41.8 | 42 |
| 10 km pursuit ^{4} | Michela Ponza | 4 | 35:54.7 | 38 |

| Event | Athlete | Time | Misses | Adjusted time ^{3} | Rank |
|---|---|---|---|---|---|
| 15 km | Nathalie Santer | DNF | – | DNF | – |
| 15 km | Saskia Santer | 47:14.7 | 7 | 54:14.7 | 49 |
| 15 km | Katja Haller | 51:44.0 | 2 | 53:44.0 | 47 |
| 15 km | Michela Ponza | 50:13.6 | 2 | 52:13.6 | 36 |

Women's 4 × 7.5 km relay

| Athletes | Race | | |
| Athletes | Misses ^{1} | Time | Rank |
|---|---|---|---|
| Michela Ponza; Nathalie Santer; Katja Haller; Saskia Santer | 2 | 1'34:03.7 | 11 |

^{1} A penalty loop of 150 metres had to be skied per missed target.
^{2} Starting delay based on 10 km sprint results.
^{3} One minute added per missed target.
^{4} Starting delay based on 7.5 km sprint results.

== Bobsleigh ==
Men

| Sled | Athletes | Event | Run 1 | | Run 2 | | Run 3 | | Run 4 | | Total | |
| Sled | Athletes | Event | Time | Rank | Time | Rank | Time | Rank | Time | Rank | Time | Rank |
|---|---|---|---|---|---|---|---|---|---|---|---|---|
| ITA-1 | Günther Huber; Antonio Tartaglia | Two-man | 47.84 | 7 | 47.88 | 8 | 47.92 | 8 | 48.00 | 9 | 3:11.64 | 8 |
| ITA-2 | Cristian La Grassa; Fabrizio Tosini | Two-man | 48.04 | 10 | 48.16 | 13 | 48.03 | 9 | 48.37 | 20 | 3:12.60 | 11 |

| Sled | Athletes | Event | Run 1 | | Run 2 | | Run 3 | | Run 4 | | Total | |
| Sled | Athletes | Event | Time | Rank | Time | Rank | Time | Rank | Time | Rank | Time | Rank |
|---|---|---|---|---|---|---|---|---|---|---|---|---|
| ITA-1 | Fabrizio Tosini; Andrea Pais de Libera; Massimiliano Rota; Giona Cividino | Four-man | 47.48 | 21 | 47.40 | 20 | 48.11 | 21 | 47.97 | 15 | 3:10.96 | 19 |

Women

| Sled | Athletes | Event | Run 1 | | Run 2 | | Total | |
| Sled | Athletes | Event | Time | Rank | Time | Rank | Time | Rank |
|---|---|---|---|---|---|---|---|---|
| ITA-1 | Gerda Weissensteiner; Antonella Bellutti | Two-woman | 49.66 | 8 | 49.55 | 7 | 1:39.21 | 7 |

== Cross-country skiing ==
Men

Sprint

| Athlete | Qualifying round | | Quarter finals | | Semi finals | | Finals | |
| Athlete | Time | Rank | Time | Rank | Time | Rank | Time | Final rank |
|---|---|---|---|---|---|---|---|---|
| Fulvio Valbusa | 2:57.60 | 28 | did not advance | | | | | |
| Freddy Schwienbacher | 2:53.03 | 11 Q | 2:57.7 | 2 Q | 3:00.2 | 3 QB | 2:56.1 | 5 |
| Silvio Fauner | 2:51.51 | 7 Q | 2:53.9 | 4 | did not advance | | | |
| Cristian Zorzi | 2:50.34 | 2 Q | 2:52.1 | 2 Q | 2:59.9 | 1 QF | 2:57.2 | 3rd place, bronze medalist(s) |

Pursuit

| Athlete | 10 km C | | 10 km F pursuit^{1} | |
| Athlete | Time | Rank | Time | Final rank |
|---|---|---|---|---|
| Fulvio Valbusa | 27:30.6 | 30 Q | 24:42.7 | 18 |
| Fabio Maj | 27:16.4 | 26 Q | 24:43.8 | 20 |
| Pietro Piller Cottrer | 27:06.2 | 22 Q | 23:54.2 | 6 |
| Giorgio Di Centa | 26:30.9 | 3 Q | 23:46.8 | 4 |

| Event | Athlete | Race | |
| Event | Athlete | Time | Rank |
|---|---|---|---|
| 15 km C | Giorgio Di Centa | 40:22.6 | 35 |
| 15 km C | Fulvio Valbusa | 39:50.6 | 31 |
| 15 km C | Cristian Saracco | 39:48.4 | 28 |
| 15 km C | Freddy Schwienbacher | 39:44.9 | 26 |
| 30 km F | Silvio Fauner | 1'19:43.9 | 51 |
| 30 km F | Fabio Maj | 1'13:43.5 | 13 |
| 30 km F | Cristian Zorzi | 1'13:10.0 | 9 |
| 30 km F | Pietro Piller Cottrer | 1'11:42.8 | 4 |
| 50 km C | Fabio Santus | 2'17:41.4 | 26 |
| 50 km C | Fabio Maj | 2'14:32.4 | 14 |
| 50 km C | Giorgio Di Centa | 2'12:59.6 | 11 |

^{1} Starting delay based on 10 km C. results.
C = Classical style, F = Freestyle

4 × 10 km relay

| Athletes | Race | |
| Athletes | Time | Rank |
|---|---|---|
| Fabio Maj; Giorgio Di Centa; Pietro Piller Cottrer; Cristian Zorzi | 1'32:45.8 | 2nd place, silver medalist(s) |

Women

Sprint

| Athlete | Qualifying round | | Quarter finals | | Semi finals | | Finals | |
| Athlete | Time | Rank | Time | Rank | Time | Rank | Time | Final rank |
|---|---|---|---|---|---|---|---|---|
| Karin Moroder | 3:21.92 | 26 | did not advance | | | | | |
| Magda Genuin | 3:20.28 | 22 | did not advance | | | | | |
| Sabina Valbusa | 3:19.22 | 17 | did not advance | | | | | |
| Gabriella Paruzzi | 3:16.11 | 8 Q | 3:16.2 | 2 Q | 3:25.3 | 3 QB | 3:26.1 | 8 |

Pursuit

| Athlete | 5 km C | | 5 km F pursuit^{2} | |
| Athlete | Time | Rank | Time | Final rank |
|---|---|---|---|---|
| Cristina Paluselli | 14:36.5 | 53 | did not advance | |
| Stefania Belmondo | 13:50.4 | 17 Q | 12:37.1 | 11 |
| Sabina Valbusa | 13:41.9 | 10 Q | 12:23.9 | 9 |
| Gabriella Paruzzi | 13:33.9 | 8 Q | 12:20.4 | 8 |

| Event | Athlete | Race | |
| Event | Athlete | Time | Rank |
|---|---|---|---|
| 10 km C | Cristina Paluselli | 30:59.4 | 39 |
| 10 km C | Antonella Confortola | 30:42.2 | 34 |
| 10 km C | Marianna Longa | 30:04.0 | 20 |
| 10 km C | Stefania Belmondo | 28:45.8 | 3rd place, bronze medalist(s) |
| 15 km F | Antonella Confortola | 41:57.8 | 16 |
| 15 km F | Sabina Valbusa | 40:48.3 | 10 |
| 15 km F | Gabriella Paruzzi | 40:25.7 | 6 |
| 15 km F | Stefania Belmondo | 39:54.4 | 1st place, gold medalist(s) |
| 30 km C | Marianna Longa | 1'44:02.5 | 33 |
| 30 km C | Antonella Confortola | 1'37:47.4 | 19 |
| 30 km C | Stefania Belmondo | 1'31:01.6 | 2nd place, silver medalist(s) |
| 30 km C | Gabriella Paruzzi | 1'30:57.1 | 1st place, gold medalist(s) |

^{2} Starting delay based on 5 km C. results.
C = Classical style, F = Freestyle

4 × 5 km relay

| Athletes | Race | |
| Athletes | Time | Rank |
|---|---|---|
| Marianna Longa; Gabriella Paruzzi; Sabina Valbusa; Stefania Belmondo | 50:38.6 | 6 |

== Figure skating ==
Men

| Athlete | Points | SP | FS | Rank |
|---|---|---|---|---|
| Angelo Dolfini | DNF | 26 | DNF | – |

Women

| Athlete | Points | SP | FS | Rank |
|---|---|---|---|---|
| Vanessa Giunchi | 30.5 | 21 | 20 | 20 |
| Silvia Fontana | 17.5 | 11 | 12 | 10 |

Pairs

| Athletes | Points | SP | FS | Rank |
|---|---|---|---|---|
| Michela Cobisi; Ruben De Pra | 28.5 | 19 | 19 | 19 |

Ice Dancing

| Athletes | Points | CD1 | CD2 | OD | FD | Rank |
|---|---|---|---|---|---|---|
| Federica Faiella; Massimo Scali | 35.4 | 18 | 18 | 17 | 18 | 18 |
| Barbara Fusar-Poli; Maurizio Margaglio | 6.0 | 3 | 3 | 3 | 3 | 3rd place, bronze medalist(s) |

== Freestyle skiing ==
Men

| Athlete | Event | Qualification | | | Final | | |
| Athlete | Event | Time | Points | Rank | Time | Points | Rank |
|---|---|---|---|---|---|---|---|
| Simone Galli | Moguls | 34.93 | 21.01 | 25 | did not advance | | |

== Luge ==
Men

| Athlete | Run 1 | | Run 2 | | Run 3 | | Run 4 | | Total | |
| Athlete | Time | Rank | Time | Rank | Time | Rank | Time | Rank | Time | Rank |
|---|---|---|---|---|---|---|---|---|---|---|
| Reinhold Rainer | 44.927 | 11 | 44.801 | 7 | 44.814 | 19 | 45.212 | 20 | 2:59.754 | 12 |
| Wilfried Huber | 44.851 | 9 | 44.814 | 8 | 44.611 | 10 | 45.043 | 12 | 2:59.319 | 9 |
| Armin Zöggeler | 44.546 | 1 | 44.521 | 2 | 44.296 | 2 | 44.578 | 1 | 2:57.941 | 1st place, gold medalist(s) |

(Men's) Doubles

| Athletes | Run 1 | | Run 2 | | Total | |
| Athletes | Time | Rank | Time | Rank | Time | Rank |
|---|---|---|---|---|---|---|
| Christian Oberstolz; Patrick Gruber | 45.882 | 18 | 43.421 | 9 | 1:29.303 | 17 |
| Gerhard Plankensteiner; Oswald Haselrieder | 43.278 | 7 | 43.338 | 7 | 1:26.616 | 7 |

Women

| Athlete | Run 1 | | Run 2 | | Run 3 | | Run 4 | | Total | |
| Athlete | Time | Rank | Time | Rank | Time | Rank | Time | Rank | Time | Rank |
|---|---|---|---|---|---|---|---|---|---|---|
| Natalie Obkircher | 44.632 | 25 | 43.657 | 9 | 43.905 | 16 | 43.533 | 7 | 2:55.727 | 17 |
| Waltraud Schiefer | 44.209 | 20 | 43.798 | 15 | 43.879 | 15 | 43.830 | 16 | 2:55.716 | 16 |
| Maria Feichter | 44.042 | 17 | 43.999 | 20 | 44.050 | 22 | 44.359 | 25 | 2:56.450 | 22 |

== Short track speed skating ==
Men

| Athlete | Event | Round one | | Quarter finals | | Semi finals | | Finals | |
| Athlete | Event | Time | Rank | Time | Rank | Time | Rank | Time | Final rank |
|---|---|---|---|---|---|---|---|---|---|
| Fabio Carta | 500 m | 43.787 | 1 Q | 43.113 | 3 | did not advance | | | |
| Nicola Franceschina | 500 m | 42.876 | 1 Q | DSQ | – | did not advance | | | |
| Nicola Rodigari | 1000 m | 1:30.991 | 2 Q | 1:27.578 | 3 | did not advance | | | |
| Fabio Carta | 1000 m | 1:28.520 | 1 Q | 1:28.186 | 1 Q | 1:27.492 | 3 QB | 1:35.589 | 6 |
| Fabio Carta | 1500 m | 2:26.644 | 1 Q | | | 2:25.072 | 1 Q | 2:18.947 | 4 |
| Nicola Rodigari | 1500 m | 2:19.067 | 2 Q | | | 2:53.907 | 5 | did not advance | |
| Nicola Franceschina; Nicola Rodigari; Fabio Carta; Maurizio Carnino; Michele Antonioli | 5000 m relay | | | | | 7:10.787 | 2 Q | 6:56.327 | 2nd place, silver medalist(s) |

Women

| Athlete | Event | Round one | | Quarter finals | | Semi finals | | Finals | |
| Athlete | Event | Time | Rank | Time | Rank | Time | Rank | Time | Final rank |
|---|---|---|---|---|---|---|---|---|---|
| Marta Capurso | 500 m | 46.313 | 1 Q | 45.137 | 3 | did not advance | | | |
| Mara Zini | 500 m | 45.556 | 2 Q | 44.876 | 2 Q | 44.307 | 4 QB | 45.494 | 8 |
| Katia Zini | 1000 m | DSQ | – | did not advance | | | | | |
| Mara Zini | 1000 m | 1:33.697 | 2 Q | 1:33.880 | 3 | did not advance | | | |
| Mara Zini | 1500 m | 2:27.553 | 2 Q | | | 2:32.899 | 4 QB | 2:32.513 | 9 |
| Katia Zini | 1500 m | 3:19.248 | 6 | did not advance | | | | | |
| Marta Capurso; Mara Zini; Evelina Rodigari; Marinella Canclini; Katia Zini | 3000 m relay | | | | | 4:18.131 | 3 QB | 4:20.014 | 5 |

== Skeleton ==
Men

| Athlete | Run 1 | | Run 2 | | Total | |
| Athlete | Time | Rank | Time | Rank | Time | Rank |
|---|---|---|---|---|---|---|
| Christian Steger | 52.25 | 20 | 52.15 | 19 | 1:44.40 | 19 |

Women

| Athlete | Run 1 | | Run 2 | | Total | |
| Athlete | Time | Rank | Time | Rank | Time | Rank |
|---|---|---|---|---|---|---|
| Dany Locati | 53.19 | 9 | 53.46 | 9 | 1:46.65 | 9 |

== Ski jumping ==
| Athlete | Event | Qualifying jump | | | Final jump 1 | | | Final jump 2 | | Total | |
| Athlete | Event | Distance | Points | Rank | Distance | Points | Rank | Distance | Points | Points | Rank |
|---|---|---|---|---|---|---|---|---|---|---|---|
| Roberto Cecon | Normal hill | Pre-qualified | | | 91.0 | 117.0 | 18 Q | 91.5 | 116.0 | 233.0 | 19 |
| Roberto Cecon | Large hill | Pre-qualified | | | 120.0 | 113.0 | 23 Q | 119.5 | 112.6 | 225.6 | 19 |

== Snowboarding ==
Men's parallel giant slalom

| Athlete | Qualifying | | Round one | Quarter final | Semi final | Final | Rank |
| Athlete | Time | Rank | Round one | Quarter final | Semi final | Final | Rank |
|---|---|---|---|---|---|---|---|
| Simone Salvati | DSQ | – | did not advance | | | | |
| Kurt Niederstätter | 38.22 | 22 | did not advance | | | | |
| Roland Fischnaller | 37.70 | 19 | did not advance | | | | |
| Walter Feichter | 37.33 | 14 Q | (Sweden) Daniel Biveson W | (United States) Chris Klug L | did not advance | | 8 |

Men's halfpipe

| Athlete | Qualifying round 1 | | Qualifying round 2 | | Final | |
| Athlete | Points | Rank | Points | Rank | Points | Rank |
|---|---|---|---|---|---|---|
| Giacomo Kratter | 39.8 | 4 QF | | | 42.0 | 4 |

Women's parallel giant slalom

| Athlete | Qualifying | | Round one | Quarter final | Semi final | Final | Rank |
| Athlete | Time | Rank | Round one | Quarter final | Semi final | Final | Rank |
|---|---|---|---|---|---|---|---|
| Marion Posch | 42.59 | 12 Q | (France) Julie Pomagalski L | did not advance | | | |
| Dagi Mair unter der Eggen | 42.32 | 8 Q | (Poland) Jagna Marczułajtis L | did not advance | | | |
| Isabella Dal Balcon | 42.26 | 6 Q | (Germany) Katharina Himmler W | (Italy) Lidia Trettel L | did not advance | | 7 |
| Lidia Trettel | 41.94 | 3 Q | (Slovakia) Jana Šedová W | (Italy) Isabella Dal Balcon W | (France) Karine Ruby L | (Poland) Jagna Marczułajtis W | 3rd place, bronze medalist(s) |

Women's halfpipe

| Athlete | Qualifying round 1 | | Qualifying round 2 | | Final | |
| Athlete | Points | Rank | Points | Rank | Points | Rank |
|---|---|---|---|---|---|---|
| Alessandra Pescosta | 16.7 | 20 | 27.4 | 10 | did not advance | |

== Speed skating ==
Men

| Event | Athlete | Race 1 | | Race 2 | | Total | |
| Event | Athlete | Time | Rank | Time | Rank | Time | Rank |
|---|---|---|---|---|---|---|---|
| 500 m | Dino Gillarduzzi | 36.42 | 30 | 36.27 | 33 | 72.69 | 30 |
| 500 m | Ermanno Ioriatti | 36.30 | 28 | DNF | – | DNF | – |
| 500 m | Davide Carta | 35.70 | 22 | 35.69 | 29 | 71.39 | 23 |
| 1000 m | Dino Gillarduzzi | | | | | 1:10.96 | 36 |
| 1000 m | Davide Carta | | | | | 1:09.81 | 26 |
| 1500 m | Roberto Sighel | | | | | 1:48.40 | 31 |
| 1500 m | Enrico Fabris | | | | | 1:47.83 | 26 |
| 1500 m | Stefano Donagrandi | | | | | 1:47.72 | 24 |
| 5000 m | Stefano Donagrandi | | | | | 6:32.37 | 20 |
| 5000 m | Enrico Fabris | | | | | 6:30.19 | 16 |
| 5000 m | Roberto Sighel | | | | | 6:25.11 | 7 |
| 10,000 m | Roberto Sighel | | | | | 13:26.19 | 7 |

Women

| Event | Athlete | Race 1 | | Race 2 | | Total | |
| Event | Athlete | Time | Rank | Time | Rank | Time | Rank |
|---|---|---|---|---|---|---|---|
| 500 m | Chiara Simionato | 38.45 | 18 | 38.47 | 15 | 76.92 | 16 |
| 1000 m | Chiara Simionato | | | | | 1:14.86 | 10 |
| 1500 m | Nicola Mayr | | | | | 2:00.73 | 27 |
| 1500 m | Chiara Simionato | | | | | 1:58.52 | 16 |
| 3000 m | Nicola Mayr | | | | | 4:15.79 | 22 |
