= Sabina Valbusa =

Italian cross-country skier

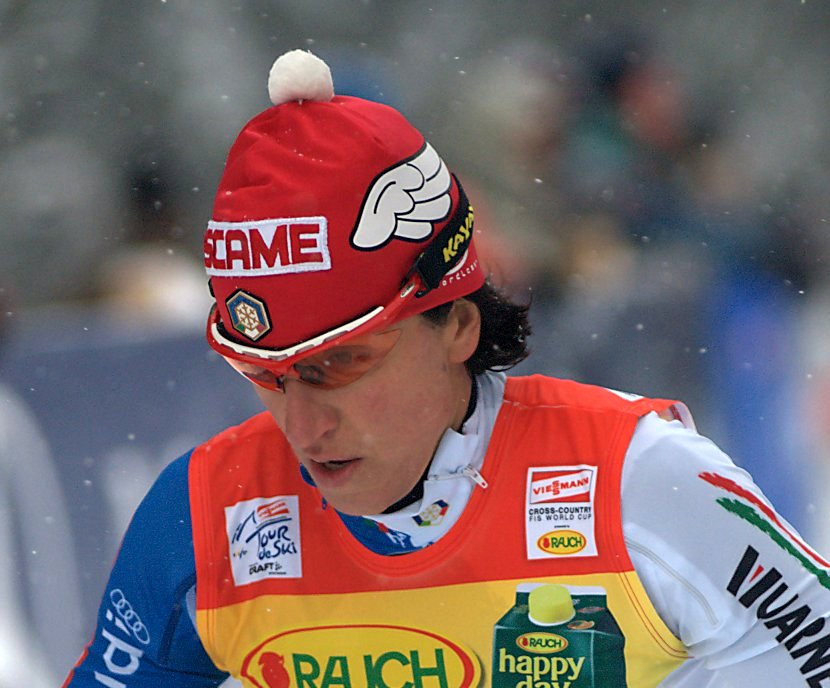
- Valbusa in 2010

Personal information
- Nationality: Italy
- Born: 21 January 1972 (age 54) Verona, Italy

Sport
- Sport: Skiing
- Club: G.S. Forestale

World Cup career
- Seasons: 18 – (1993–2010)
- Indiv. starts: 251
- Indiv. podiums: 10
- Indiv. wins: 1
- Team starts: 68
- Team podiums: 24
- Team wins: 4
- Overall titles: 0 – (8th in 2003)
- Discipline titles: 0
Medal record
Women's cross-country skiing
Representing Italy
Olympic Games
Bronze medal – third place	2006 Turin	4 × 5 km relay
World Championships
Silver medal – second place	1999 Ramsau	4 × 5 km relay
Bronze medal – third place	2001 Lahti	4 × 5 km relay
Bronze medal – third place	2005 Oberstdorf	4 × 5 km relay

Sabina Valbusa (born 21 January 1972 in Verona) is an Italian cross-country skier who competed from 1993 to 2010.

== Biography ==
Competing in five Winter Olympics, she earned a bronze medal in the 4 × 5 km relay at the 2006 Winter Olympics in Turin. Her best individual finish was a ninth in the 5 km + 5 km combined pursuit at the 2002 Winter Olympics in Salt Lake City.

Valbusa earned three medals in the 4 × 5 km relay at the FIS Nordic World Ski Championships (silver: 1999, bronze :2001, 2005). Her best individual finish was a fourth in the individual sprint in 2001. Her only individual victory came at Pragelato, Italy in a 15 km event in 2004.

She is the younger sister of cross-country skier Fulvio Valbusa.

== Cross-country skiing results ==
All results are sourced from the International Ski Federation (FIS).

=== Olympic Games ===
- 1 medal – (1 bronze)

Year	Age	5 km	10 km	15 km	Pursuit	30 km	Sprint	4 × 5 km relay	Team sprint
1994	22	—	—N/a	26	—	—	—N/a	—	—N/a
1998	26	29	—N/a	—	17	—	—N/a	—	—N/a
2002	30	—N/a	—	10	9	—	17	6	—N/a
2006	34	—N/a	—	—N/a	17	10	—	Bronze	—
2010	38	—N/a	17	—N/a	18	DNS	—	4	—

=== World Championships ===
- 3 medals – (1 silver, 2 bronze)

Year	Age	5 km	10 km	15 km	Pursuit	30 km	Sprint	4 × 5 km relay	Team sprint
1995	23	55	—N/a	—	28	14	—N/a	—	—N/a
1997	25	39	—N/a	16	22	20	—N/a	4	—N/a
1999	27	15	—N/a	15	13	32	—N/a	Silver	—N/a
2001	29	—N/a	—	18	10	CNX^{[a]}	4	Bronze	—N/a
2003	31	—N/a	—	DNF	—	5	25	—	—N/a
2005	33	—N/a	8	—N/a	16	18	—	Bronze	5
2007	35	—N/a	13	—N/a	33	—	—	6	8
2009	37	—N/a	—	—N/a	28	19	—	5	—

a. ^{1} Cancelled due to extremely cold weather.

=== World Cup ===
==== Season standings ====
Season	Age	Discipline standings					Ski Tour standings	
Season	Age	Overall	Distance	Long Distance	Middle Distance	Sprint	Tour de Ski	World Cup Final
1993	21	58	—N/a	—N/a	—N/a	—N/a	—N/a	—N/a
1994	22	57	—N/a	—N/a	—N/a	—N/a	—N/a	—N/a
1995	23	35	—N/a	—N/a	—N/a	—N/a	—N/a	—N/a
1996	24	NC	—N/a	—N/a	—N/a	—N/a	—N/a	—N/a
1997	25	21	—N/a	13	—N/a	26	—N/a	—N/a
1998	26	22	—N/a	11	—N/a	39	—N/a	—N/a
1999	27	21	—N/a	20	—N/a	29	—N/a	—N/a
2000	28	20	—N/a	16	15	49	—N/a	—N/a
2001	29	13	—N/a	—N/a	—N/a	18	—N/a	—N/a
2002	30	10	—N/a	—N/a	—N/a	8	—N/a	—N/a
2003	31	8	—N/a	—N/a	—N/a	16	—N/a	—N/a
2004	32	10	9	—N/a	—N/a	42	—N/a	—N/a
2005	33	22	16	—N/a	—N/a	NC	—N/a	—N/a
2006	34	24	16	—N/a	—N/a	NC	—N/a	—N/a
2007	35	31	24	—N/a	—N/a	66	18	—N/a
2008	36	22	18	—N/a	—N/a	48	19	14
2009	37	42	27	—N/a	—N/a	NC	—	46
2010	38	40	26	—N/a	—N/a	NC	17	25

==== Individual podiums ====
- 1 victory – (1 WC)
- 10 podiums – (9 WC, 1 SWC)

No.	Season	Date	Location	Race	Level	Place
1	1997–98	16 December 1997	Val di Fiemme, Italy	15 km Individual F	World Cup	2nd
2	1999–00	16 February 2000	Ulrichen, Switzerland	5 km Individual F	World Cup	3rd
3	2001–02	27 December 2001	Garmisch-Partenkirchen, Germany	0.7 km Sprint F	World Cup	2nd
4	2001–02	6 January 2002	Val di Fiemme, Italy	1.5 km Sprint F	World Cup	3rd
5	2002–03	4 January 2003	Kavgolovo, Russia	5 km Individual F	World Cup	2nd
6	2002–03	12 February 2003	Reit im Winkl, Germany	1.5 km Sprint F	World Cup	3rd
7	2003–04	6 February 2004	La Clusaz, France	10 km Individual F	World Cup	3rd
8	2003–04	28 February 2004	Oslo, Norway	30 km Individual F	World Cup	2nd
9	2003–04	13 March 2004	Pragelato, Italy	15 km Individual F	World Cup	1st
10	2007–08	29 December 2007	Nové Město, Czech Republic	10 km Pursuit F	Stage World Cup	2nd

==== Team podiums ====
- 4 victories – (2 RL, 2 TS)
- 24 podiums – (20 RL, 4 TS)

No.	Season	Date	Location	Race	Level	Place	Teammate(s)
1	1994–95	7 February 1995	Hamar, Norway	4 × 3 km Relay F	World Cup	3rd	Dal Sasso / Paluselli / Belmondo
2	1996–97	15 December 1996	Brusson, Italy	4 × 5 km Relay F	World Cup	3rd	Paruzzi / Dal Sasso / Belmondo
3	1996–97	19 January 1997	Lahti, Finland	8 × 1.5 km Team Sprint F	World Cup	1st	Belmondo
4	1996–97	16 March 1997	Oslo, Norway	4 × 5 km Relay F	World Cup	3rd	Paruzzi / Peyrot / Belmondo
5	1997–98	23 November 1997	Beitostølen, Norway	4 × 5 km Relay C	World Cup	3rd	Moroder / Belmondo / Paruzzi
6	1997–98	7 December 1997	Santa Caterina, Italy	4 × 5 km Relay F	World Cup	3rd	Paruzzi / Moroder / Belmondo
7	1997–98	14 December 1997	Val di Fiemme, Italy	4 × 5 km Relay F	World Cup	2nd	Paruzzi / Di Centa / Belmondo
8	1998–99	29 November 1998	Muonio, Finland	4 × 5 km Relay F	World Cup	2nd	Moroder / Paruzzi / Belmondo
9	1998–99	20 December 1998	Davos, Switzerland	4 × 5 km Relay C/F	World Cup	2nd	Paruzzi / Confortola / Belmondo
10	1998–99	10 January 1999	Nové Město, Czech Republic	4 × 5 km Relay C/F	World Cup	3rd	Paruzzi / Confortola / Belmondo
11	1998–99	26 February 1999	Ramsau, Austria	4 × 5 km Relay C/F	World Championships^{[1]}	2nd	Paruzzi / Confortola / Belmondo
12	1998–99	14 March 1999	Falun, Sweden	4 × 5 km Relay C/F	World Cup	3rd	Paruzzi / Confortola / Belmondo
13	1999–00	27 February 2000	Falun, Sweden	4 × 5 km Relay F	World Cup	3rd	Paruzzi / Confortola / Belmondo
14	1999–00	4 March 2000	Lahti, Finland	4 × 5 km Relay C/F	World Cup	3rd	Santer / Paruzzi / Confortola
15	2000–01	13 December 2000	Clusone, Italy	6 × 1.5 km Team Sprint F	World Cup	2nd	Belmondo
16	2000–01	13 January 2001	Soldier Hollow, United States	4 × 5 km Relay C/F	World Cup	1st	Paruzzi / Paluselli / Belmondo
17	2001–02	13 January 2002	Nové Město, Czech Republic	4 × 1.5 km Team Sprint F	World Cup	2nd	Paruzzi
18	2001–02	3 March 2002	Lahti, Finland	4 × 1.5 km Team Sprint F	World Cup	1st	Paruzzi
19	2001–02	10 March 2002	Falun, Sweden	4 × 5 km Relay C/F	World Cup	1st	Paruzzi / Paluselli / Belmondo
20	2002–03	24 November 2002	Kiruna, Sweden	4 × 5 km Relay C/F	World Cup	3rd	Genuin / Paruzzi / Follis
21	2002–03	1 December 2002	Rukatunturi, Finland	2 × 5 km / 2 × 10 km Relay C/F	World Cup	3rd	Paruzzi / F. Valbusa / Piller Cottrer
22	2002–03	23 March 2003	Falun, Sweden	4 × 5 km Relay C/F	World Cup	3rd	Paruzzi / Confortola / Follis
23	2003–04	7 February 2004	La Clusaz, France	4 × 5 km Relay C/F	World Cup	3rd	Longa / Paruzzi / Confortola
24	2009–10	7 March 2010	Lahti, Finland	4 × 5 km Relay C/F	World Cup	3rd	Longa / Confortola / Follis

Note: ^{1} Until the 1999 World Championships, World Championship races were included in the World Cup scoring system.

=== Italian Championships ===
- 1993: 3rd, Italian women's championships of cross-country skiing, 30 km
- 1994:
  - 3rd, Italian women's championships of cross-country skiing, 15 km
  - 3rd, Italian women's championships of cross-country skiing, 10 km
- 1995:
  - 2nd, Italian women's championships of cross-country skiing, 5 km
  - 3rd, Italian women's championships of cross-country skiing, 10 km
- 1997:
  - 1st, Italian women's championships of cross-country skiing, 30 km
  - 2nd, Italian women's championships of cross-country skiing, 15 km
  - 2nd, Italian women's championships of cross-country skiing, 10 km
  - 3rd, Italian women's championships of cross-country skiing, 5 km
- 1998:
  - 2nd, Italian women's championships of cross-country skiing, 30 km
  - 2nd, Italian women's championships of cross-country skiing, 10 km
  - 3rd, Italian women's championships of cross-country skiing, 5 km
- 1999:
  - 2nd, Italian women's championships of cross-country skiing, 10 km
  - 2nd, Italian women's championships of cross-country skiing, 5 km
- 2000:
  - 2nd, Italian women's championships of cross-country skiing, 30 km
  - 2nd, Italian women's championships of cross-country skiing, 5 km
  - 3rd, Italian women's championships of cross-country skiing, 15 km
  - 3rd, Italian women's championships of cross-country skiing, 10 km
- 2001:
  - 1st, Italian women's championships of cross-country skiing, sprint
  - 3rd, Italian women's championships of cross-country skiing, 15 km
  - 3rd, Italian women's championships of cross-country skiing, 5 km pursuit
- 2002: 2nd, Italian women's championships of cross-country skiing, sprint
- 2003:
  - 1st, Italian women's championships of cross-country skiing, 10 km duathlon
  - 1st, Italian women's championships of cross-country skiing, 5 km pursuit
  - 2nd, Italian women's championships of cross-country skiing, 15 km
  - 3rd, Italian women's championships of cross-country skiing, sprint
- 2004:
  - 1st, Italian women's championships of cross-country skiing, 10 km
  - 1st, Italian women's championships of cross-country skiing, 7.5 km free & classic
  - 1st, Italian women's championships of cross-country skiing, 5 km pursuit
  - 3rd, Italian women's championships of cross-country skiing, 30 km
- 2005:
  - 1st, Italian women's championships of cross-country skiing, 10 km
  - 2nd, Italian women's championships of cross-country skiing, 2 x 7.5 km pursuit
- 2006: 2nd, Italian women's championships of cross-country skiing, 30 km
- 2007:
  - 1st, Italian women's championships of cross-country skiing, 10 km
  - 2nd, Italian women's championships of cross-country skiing, 2 x 7.5 km pursuit
- 2008:
  - 1st, Italian women's championships of cross-country skiing, 2 x 7.5 km pursuit
  - 1st, Italian women's championships of cross-country skiing, 10 km
- 2010: 1st, Italian women's championships of cross-country skiing, 10 km
