= Gabriella Paruzzi =

Italian cross-country skier (born 1969)

Personal information
- Nationality: Italy
- Born: 21 June 1969 (age 57) Udine, Friuli-Venezia Giulia, Italy
- Height: 173 cm (5 ft 8 in)

Sport
- Sport: Skiing
- Club: G.S. Forestale

World Cup career
- Seasons: 17 – (1990–2006)
- Indiv. starts: 229
- Indiv. podiums: 18
- Indiv. wins: 4
- Team starts: 59
- Team podiums: 21
- Team wins: 7
- Overall titles: 1 – (2004)
- Discipline titles: 0
Medal record
Women's cross-country skiing
Representing Italy
Olympic Games
Gold medal – first place	2002 Salt Lake City	30 km classical
Bronze medal – third place	1992 Albertville	4 × 5 km relay
Bronze medal – third place	1994 Lillehammer	4 × 5 km relay
Bronze medal – third place	1998 Nagano	4 × 5 km relay
Bronze medal – third place	2006 Turin	4 × 5 km relay
World Championships
Silver medal – second place	1991 Val di Fiemme	4 × 5 km relay
Silver medal – second place	1993 Falun	4 × 5 km relay
Silver medal – second place	1999 Ramsau	4 × 5 km relay
Bronze medal – third place	2001 Lahti	4 × 5 km relay
Bronze medal – third place	2005 Oberstdorf	4 × 5 km relay

Gabriella Paruzzi (born 21 June 1969) is a retired Italian cross-country skier who competed from 1991 to 2006 and formerly skied with the G.S. Forestale. She skied in World Cup events, and won the Women's Overall World Cup in 2004.

== Equipment ==
She was sponsored by Rossignol, and skied with Rossignol X-IUM skis for both skate and classic disciplines. Her boots were also named Rossignol X-IUM's, and the bindings were Rottefella R3's. Her boots and bindings were of the New Nordic Norm (NNN) system.

== 2002 Winter Olympics ==
At the 2002 Olympics, she was in the women's 30 km classical event, when one of her poles broke. Luckily, her coach was nearby, and she took his pole, which was too long. She kept on racing and near the end the coach came back to give her the right size pole. She caught the pack of skiers and ended up winning gold by 4.5 seconds in that race.

== Cross-country skiing results ==
All results are sourced from the International Ski Federation (FIS).

=== Olympic Games ===
- 5 medals – (1 gold, 4 bronze)

Year	Age	5 km	10 km	15 km	Pursuit	30 km	Sprint	4 × 5 km relay	Team sprint
1992	22	23	—N/a	9	16	12	—N/a	Bronze	—N/a
1994	24	24	—N/a	12	18	30	—N/a	Bronze	—N/a
1998	28	9	—N/a	14	12	10	—N/a	Bronze	—N/a
2002	32	—N/a	—	6	8	Gold	8	6	—N/a
2006	36	—N/a	13	—N/a	5	5	—	Bronze	7

=== World Championships ===
- 5 medals – (3 silver, 2 bronze)

Year	Age	5 km	10 km	15 km	Pursuit	30 km	Sprint	4 × 5 km relay	Team sprint
1991	21	26	19	—	—N/a	8	—N/a	Silver	—N/a
1993	23	26	—N/a	18	14	6	—N/a	Silver	—N/a
1995	25	19	—N/a	—	8	12	—N/a	4	—N/a
1997	27	20	—N/a	—	15	9	—N/a	4	—N/a
1999	29	19	—N/a	17	12	10	—N/a	Silver	—N/a
2001	31	—N/a	16	—	13	CNX^{[a]}	17	Bronze	—N/a
2003	33	—N/a	4	—	5	4	—	—	—N/a
2005	35	—N/a	11	—N/a	5	16	—	Bronze	—

a. ^{1} Cancelled due to extremely cold weather.

=== World Cup ===
==== Season standings ====
Season	Age					
Season	Age	Overall	Distance	Long Distance	Middle Distance	Sprint
1990	20	NC	—N/a	—N/a	—N/a	—N/a
1991	21	25	—N/a	—N/a	—N/a	—N/a
1992	22	22	—N/a	—N/a	—N/a	—N/a
1993	23	15	—N/a	—N/a	—N/a	—N/a
1994	24	27	—N/a	—N/a	—N/a	—N/a
1995	25	27	—N/a	—N/a	—N/a	—N/a
1996	26	20	—N/a	—N/a	—N/a	—N/a
1997	27	24	—N/a	23	—N/a	23
1998	28	26	—N/a	22	—N/a	26
1999	29	16	—N/a	10	—N/a	26
2000	30	21	—N/a	18	17	30
2001	31	6	—N/a	—N/a	—N/a	6
2002	32	8	—N/a	—N/a	—N/a	16
2003	33	3rd place, bronze medalist(s)	—N/a	—N/a	—N/a	14
2004	34	1st place, gold medalist(s)	2nd place, silver medalist(s)	—N/a	—N/a	2nd place, silver medalist(s)
2005	35	10	10	—N/a	—N/a	22
2006	36	36	24	—N/a	—N/a	NC

==== Individual podiums ====
- 4 victories
- 18 podiums

No.	Season	Date	Location	Race	Level	Place
1	2000–01	10 January 2001	Soldier Hollow, United States	5 km + 5 km Pursuit C/F	World Cup	2nd
2	2001–02	9 March 2002	Falun, Sweden	5 km + 5 km Pursuit C/F	World Cup	3rd
3	2001–02	16 March 2002	Oslo, Norway	30 km Individual F	World Cup	3rd
4	2002–03	26 October 2002	Düsseldorf, Germany	1.5 km Sprint F	World Cup	2nd
5	2002–03	7 December 2002	Davos, Switzerland	10 km Individual F	World Cup	3rd
6	2002–03	4 January 2003	Kavgolovo, Russia	5 km Individual F	World Cup	3rd
7	2002–03	18 January 2003	Nové Město, Czech Republic	10 km Individual F	World Cup	2nd
8	2002–03	16 March 2003	Lahti, Finland	10 km Individual F	World Cup	1st
9	2003–04	25 October 2003	Düsseldorf, Germany	0.8 km Sprint F	World Cup	1st
10	2003–04	13 December 2003	Davos, Switzerland	10 km Individual C	World Cup	3rd
11	2003–04	20 December 2003	Ramsau, Austria	10 km Individual F	World Cup	3rd
12	2003–04	6 January 2004	Falun, Sweden	7.5 km + 7.5 km Pursuit C/F	World Cup	2nd
13	2003–04	17 January 2004	Nové Město, Czech Republic	10 km Individual C	World Cup	1st
14	2003–04	25 January 2004	Marcialonga, Italy	70 km Mass Start C	World Cup	1st
15	2003–04	5 March 2004	Lahti, Finland	1.0 km Sprint F	World Cup	2nd
16	2003–04	7 March 2004	Lahti, Finland	10 km Individual C	World Cup	2nd
17	2003–04	23 October 2003	Düsseldorf, Germany	0.8 km Sprint F	World Cup	3rd
18	2004–05	23 October 2003	Lago di Tesero, Italy	7.5 km + 7.5 km Pursuit C/F	World Cup	3rd

==== Team podiums ====
- 3 victories – (2 RL, 1 TS)
- 29 podiums – (25 RL, 4 TS)

No.	Season	Date	Location	Race	Level	Place	Teammate(s)
1	1990–91	15 February 1991	Val di Fiemme, Italy	4 × 5 km Relay C/F	World Championships^{[1]}	2nd	Vanzetta / Di Centa / Belmondo
2	1991–92	18 February 1992	Albertville, France	4 × 5 km Relay C/F	Olympic Games^{[1]}	3rd	Vanzetta / Di Centa / Belmondo
3	1992–93	26 February 1993	Falun, Sweden	4 × 5 km Relay C/F	World Championships^{[1]}	2nd	Vanzetta / Di Centa / Belmondo
4	1993–94	22 February 1994	Lillehammer, Norway	4 × 5 km Relay C/F	Olympic Games^{[1]}	3rd	Vanzetta / Di Centa / Belmondo
5	1995–96	17 December 1995	Santa Caterina, Italy	4 × 5 km Relay C	World Cup	2nd	Paluselli / Belmondo / Di Centa
6	1995–96	14 January 1996	Nové Město, Czech Republic	4 × 5 km Relay C	World Cup	3rd	Paluselli / Belmondo / Di Centa
7	1996–97	15 December 1996	Brusson, Italy	4 × 5 km Relay F	World Cup	3rd	S. Valbusa / Dal Sasso / Belmondo
8	1996–97	16 March 1997	Oslo, Norway	4 × 5 km Relay F	World Cup	3rd	Peyrot / S. Valbusa / Belmondo
9	1997–98	23 November 1997	Beitostølen, Norway	4 × 5 km Relay C	World Cup	3rd	Moroder / S. Valbusa / Belmondo
10	1997–98	7 December 1997	Santa Caterina, Italy	4 × 5 km Relay F	World Cup	3rd	Moroder / S. Valbusa / Belmondo
11	1997–98	14 December 1997	Val di Fiemme, Italy	4 × 5 km Relay F	World Cup	2nd	Di Centa / S. Valbusa / Belmondo
12	1998–99	29 November 1998	Muonio, Finland	4 × 5 km Relay F	World Cup	2nd	Moroder / S. Valbusa / Belmondo
13	1998–99	20 December 1998	Davos, Switzerland	4 × 5 km Relay C/F	World Cup	2nd	Confortola / Belmondo / S. Valbusa
14	1998–99	10 January 1999	Nové Město, Czech Republic	4 × 5 km Relay C/F	World Cup	3rd	Confortola / Belmondo / S. Valbusa
15	1998–99	26 February 1999	Ramsau, Austria	4 × 5 km Relay C/F	World Championships^{[1]}	2nd	S. Valbusa / Confortola / Belmondo
16	1998–99	14 March 1999	Falun, Sweden	4 × 5 km Relay C/F	World Cup	3rd	S. Valbusa / Confortola / Belmondo
17	1999–00	27 February 2000	Falun, Sweden	4 × 5 km Relay F	World Cup	3rd	S. Valbusa / Confortola / Belmondo
18	1999–00	4 March 2000	Lahti, Finland	4 × 5 km Relay C/F	World Cup	3rd	Santer / Confortola / S. Valbusa
19	2000–01	13 January 2001	Soldier Hollow, United States	4 × 5 km Relay C/F	World Cup	1st	S. Valbusa / Paluselli / Belmondo
20	2001–02	16 December 2001	Davos, Switzerland	4 × 5 km Relay C/F	World Cup	3rd	Paluselli / Follis / Belmondo
21	2001–02	13 January 2002	Nové Město, Czech Republic	4 × 1.5 km Team Sprint F	World Cup	2nd	S. Valbusa
22	2001–02	3 March 2002	Lahti, Finland	4 × 1.5 km Team Sprint F	World Cup	1st	S. Valbusa
23	2001–02	10 March 2002	Falun, Sweden	4 × 5 km Relay C/F	World Cup	1st	S. Valbusa / Paluselli / Belmondo
24	2002–03	24 November 2002	Kiruna, Sweden	4 × 5 km Relay C/F	World Cup	3rd	Genuin / Follis / S. Valbusa
25	2002–03	1 December 2002	Rukatunturi, Finland	2 × 5 km / 2 × 10 km Relay C/F	World Cup	3rd	F. Valbusa / S. Valbusa / Piller Cottrer
26	2002–03	23 March 2003	Falun, Sweden	4 × 5 km Relay C/F	World Cup	3rd	S. Valbusa / Confortola / Follis
27	2003–04	7 February 2004	La Clusaz, France	4 × 5 km Relay C/F	World Cup	3rd	Longa / Confortola / S. Valbusa
28	2004–05	24 November 2004	Düsseldorf, Germany	6 × 0.8 km Team Sprint F	World Cup	3rd	Follis
29	2004–05	5 December 2004	Bern, Switzerland	6 × 1.1 km Team Sprint F	World Cup	3rd	Follis

Note: ^{1} Until the 1999 World Championships and the 1994 Olympics, World Championship and Olympic races were included in the World Cup scoring system.

== Trivia ==
- The ski stadium in Tarvisio is named in her honor.
