= Luge at the 2002 Winter Olympics – Women's singles =

Women's singles at the XIX Olympic Winter Games
- Pictogram for luge
- Venue: Utah Olympic Park
- Dates: 12–13 February 2002
- Competitors: 29 from 15 nations

Medalists
1st place, gold medalist(s)		Sylke Otto	Germany
2nd place, silver medalist(s)		Barbara Niedernhuber	Germany
3rd place, bronze medalist(s)		Silke Kraushaar	Germany

The women's luge at the 2002 Winter Olympics began on 12 February, and was completed on 13 February at Cesana Pariol.

== Results ==
Runs 1 and 2 were held on 12 February, and runs 3 and 4 on 13 February. The German women sweep the podium in the sport for the fifth time in history.

Place	Athlete	Country	Run 1	Run 2	Run 3	Run 4	Total	Behind
Gold medal	Sylke Otto	Germany	43.356	43.076	42.940	43.092	2:52.464	—
Silver medal	Barbara Niedernhuber	Germany	44.614	43.134	43.215	43.090	2:52.785	+0.321
Bronze medal	Silke Kraushaar	Germany	43.294	43.224	43.195	43.152	2:52.865	+0.401
4	Angelika Neuner	Austria	43.683	43.440	43.601	43.438	2:54.162	+1.698
5	Becky Wilczak	United States	43.509	43.481	43.420	43.844	2:54.254	+1.790
6	Liliya Ludan	Ukraine	43.800	43.623	43.565	43.511	2:54.499	+2.035
7	Sonja Manzenreiter	Austria	43.864	43.540	43.585	43.548	2:54.537	+2.073
8	Ashley Hayden	United States	43.765	43.645	43.428	43.820	2:54.658	+2.194
9	Anna Orlova	Latvia	43.795	43.658	43.642	43.644	2:54.739	+2.275
10	Iluta Gaile	Latvia	43.779	43.791	43.656	43.847	2:55.073	+2.609
11	Simone Eder	Austria	43.880	43.760	43.824	43.638	2:55.102	+2.638
12	Regan Lauscher	Canada	44.001	43.681	43.615	43.821	2:55.118	+2.654
13	Courtney Zablocki	United States	43.934	44.103	43.734	43.383	2:55.154	+2.690
14	Margarita Klimenko	Russia	43.889	43.951	43.920	43.800	2:55.560	+3.096
15	Anastasia Antonova	Russia	44.034	43.840	43.967	43.828	2:55.669	+3.205
16	Waltraud Schiefer	Italy	44.209	43.798	43.879	43.830	2:55.716	+3.252
17	Natalie Obkircher	Italy	44.632	43.657	43.905	43.533	2:55.727	+3.263
18	Maija Tīruma	Latvia	44.050	43.954	43.971	43.956	2:55.931	+3.467
19	Markéta Jeriová	Czech Republic	44.710	43.764	43.845	43.811	2:56.130	+3.666
20	Oryslava Tscuclib	Ukraine	44.274	43.942	44.060	44.005	2:56.281	+3.817
21	Veronika Sabolová	Slovakia	44.021	44.113	43.947	44.231	2:56.312	+3.848
22	Maria Feichter	Italy	44.042	43.999	44.050	44.359	2:56.450	+3.986
23	Angela Paul	New Zealand	44.407	44.256	43.943	43.869	2:56.475	+4.011
24	Melanie Ougier	France	44.228	44.055	44.161	44.043	2:56.487	+4.023
25	Yumie Kobayashi	Japan	44.192	44.107	44.149	44.215	2:56.663	+4.199
26	Anne Abernathy	Virgin Islands	44.491	44.740	44.619	44.579	2:58.429	+5.965
27	Anastasiya Skulkina	Russia	44.657	44.464	44.934	44.800	2:58.855	+6.391
28	Dinah Browne	Virgin Islands	45.603	44.585	44.857	44.700	2:59.745	+7.281
	Iginia Boccalandro	Venezuela	DNF					
