= Manuela Di Centa =

Italian cross-country skier (born 1963)

Manuela Di Centa OLY
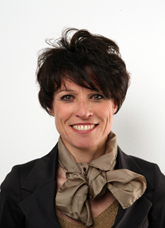
- Di Centa in 2008

Personal information
- Nationality: Italy
- Born: 31 January 1963 (age 63) Paluzza, Friuli-Venezia Giulia, Italy
- Height: 164 cm (5 ft 5 in)

Sport
- Sport: Skiing
- Club: G.S. Forestale

World Cup career
- Seasons: 14 – (1982, 1984, 1987–1998)
- Indiv. starts: 106
- Indiv. podiums: 35
- Indiv. wins: 15
- Team starts: 15
- Team podiums: 9
- Team wins: 1
- Overall titles: 2 – (1994, 1996)
- Discipline titles: 0
Medal record
Women's cross-country skiing
Representing Italy
Olympic Games
Gold medal – first place	1994 Lillehammer	15 km freestyle
Gold medal – first place	1994 Lillehammer	30 km classical
Silver medal – second place	1994 Lillehammer	5 km classical
Silver medal – second place	1994 Lillehammer	5 km + 10 km combined pursuit
Bronze medal – third place	1992 Albertville	4 × 5 km relay
Bronze medal – third place	1994 Lillehammer	4 × 5 km relay
Bronze medal – third place	1998 Nagano	4 × 5 km relay
World Championships
Silver medal – second place	1991 Val di Fiemme	4 × 5 km relay
Silver medal – second place	1993 Falun	30 km freestyle
Silver medal – second place	1993 Falun	4 × 5 km relay
Silver medal – second place	1995 Thunder Bay	30 km freestyle
Bronze medal – third place	1991 Val di Fiemme	5 km classical
Bronze medal – third place	1991 Val di Fiemme	30 km freestyle
Bronze medal – third place	1995 Thunder Bay	5 km classical
Junior World Championships
Silver medal – second place	1982 Murau	5 km

Manuela Di Centa (born 31 January 1963) is an Italian former cross-country skier and Olympic athlete. She is the sister of former cross-country skier Giorgio Di Centa and cousin of former track and field athlete Venanzio Ortis.

== Career ==
Di Centa, born in Paluzza, province of Udine, to a family of Nordic skiers, made her debut on the Italian national team in 1980 at the age of 17, skied with the G.S. Forestale. Two years later, she competed at the FIS Nordic World Ski Championships in Oslo, finishing in eighth place. After a quarrel with the president of the Italian Skiing Federation, Di Centa left the national team, not returning until 1986.

At the 1988 Winter Olympics in Calgary, she finished sixth in the 20 km freestyle. She won her first medals in international competition at the 1991 World Championships in Val di Fiemme: a silver (4 × 5 km relay) and two bronzes (5 km, 30 km). An Olympic medal followed in 1992, a bronze in the 4 × 5 km relay. In 1993, at the Falun World Championships, she won two more silvers (30 km, 4 × 5 km relay). At the 1995 FIS Nordic World Ski Championships, she won another silver (30 km) and a bronze (5 km).

Di Centa also became Italian national champion in fell running in 1985, 1989 and 1991.

Di Centa seemed confined to the role of the eternal second, but this changed abruptly at the 1994 Winter Olympics in Lillehammer, where she medaled in all five cross-country events: two gold, two silver and one bronze medal. The same year she also won her first aggregate Cross-Country Skiing World Cup, a feat she repeated in 1996.

In 1996 she was the first Italian cross-country skier to receive the Holmenkollen Medal. Her last title was a bronze at the 1998 Winter Olympics in the 4 × 5 km relay.

After retiring, Di Centa worked for Italian television (RAI), and became a member of the Italian and International Olympic Committees.

Di Centa became the first Italian woman to climb Mount Everest (with supplementary oxygen) in 2003.

Di Centa is the first Italian woman (and the 19th Italian) to compete at five Olympics, which she did from 1984 to 1998.

Her younger brother Giorgio is currently a member of the Italian national cross-country ski team and was the winner of two gold medals at the 2006 Winter Olympics.

At the 2018 Winter Olympics, di Centa was inducted into the Olympians for Life project.

Her niece, Martina, competed for 2022 and 2026 Winter Olympics in Cross-country skiing.

Di Centa is a vegan.

== 2006 Winter Olympics ==
As a member of the International Olympic Committee and the Italian National Olympic Committee (CONI) and as one of Italy's most accomplished Winter Olympic athletes, Di Centa played a prominent public role in the 2006 Winter Olympics in Turin. She was one of the eight flag bearers during the Opening Ceremonies. At the Closing Ceremonies, she participated in the awarding of medals to the winners of the men's 50 km cross-country race. Coincidentally, the gold medal winner was her younger brother Giorgio.

== Cross-country skiing results ==
All results are sourced from the International Ski Federation (FIS).

=== Olympic Games ===
- 7 medals – (2 gold, 2 silver, 3 bronze)

Year	Age	5 km	10 km	15 km	Pursuit	20 km	30 km	4 × 5 km relay
1984	21	24	28	—N/a	—N/a	26	—N/a	9
1988	25	18	20	—N/a	—N/a	6	—N/a	—
1992	29	12	—N/a	—	10	—N/a	6	Bronze
1994	31	Silver	—N/a	Gold	Silver	—N/a	Gold	Bronze
1998	35	21	—N/a	—	23	—N/a	—	Bronze

=== World Championships ===
- 7 medals – (4 silver, 3 bronze)

Year	Age	5 km	10 km classical	10 km freestyle	15 km	Pursuit	20 km	30 km	4 × 5 km relay
1982	18	8	17	—N/a	—N/a	—N/a	—	—N/a	—
1989	25	—N/a	8	7	—	—N/a	—N/a	5	6
1991	27	Bronze	—N/a	4	—	—N/a	—N/a	Bronze	Silver
1993	29	10	—N/a	—N/a	5	4	—N/a	Silver	Silver
1995	31	Bronze	—N/a	—N/a	—	4	—N/a	Silver	4
1997	33	34	—N/a	—N/a	12	DNF	—N/a	—	4

=== World Cup ===
==== Season standings ====
Season	Age	Overall	Long Distance	Sprint
1982	18	22	—N/a	—N/a
1984	20	49	—N/a	—N/a
1987	23	49	—N/a	—N/a
1988	24	27	—N/a	—N/a
1989	25	4	—N/a	—N/a
1990	26	5	—N/a	—N/a
1991	27	5	—N/a	—N/a
1992	28	9	—N/a	—N/a
1993	29	5	—N/a	—N/a
1994	30	1st place, gold medalist(s)	—N/a	—N/a
1995	31	20	—N/a	—N/a
1996	32	1st place, gold medalist(s)	—N/a	—N/a
1997	33	41	27	—
1998	34	20	20	21

==== Individual podiums ====
- 15 victories
- 35 podiums

No.	Season	Date	Location	Race	Level	Place
1	1988–89	13 January 1989	Klingenthal, East Germany	10 km Individual C	World Cup	2nd
2	1988–89	11 March 1989	Falun, Sweden	15 km Individual F	World Cup	3rd
3	1989–90	18 February 1990	Pontresina, Switzerland	15 km Individual F	World Cup	1st
4	1989–90	7 March 1990	Sollefteå, Sweden	30 km Individual F	World Cup	1st
5	1989–90	10 March 1990	Örnsköldsvik, Sweden	10 km Individual C	World Cup	2nd
6	1990–91	12 February 1991	Val di Fiemme, Italy	5 km Individual C	World Championships^{[1]}	3rd
7	1990–91	16 February 1991	Val di Fiemme, Italy	30 km Individual F	World Championships^{[1]}	3rd
8	1990–91	10 March 1991	Örnsköldsvik, Sweden	15 km Individual F	World Cup	2nd
9	1990–91	16 March 1991	Oslo, Norway	5 km Individual F	World Cup	2nd
10	1992–93	27 February 1993	Falun, Sweden	30 km Individual F	World Championships^{[1]}	2nd
11	1992–93	6 March 1993	Lahti, Finland	5 km Individual F	World Cup	2nd
12	1992–93	9 March 1993	Lillehammer, Norway	5 km Individual C	World Cup	3rd
13	1992–93	10 March 1993	Lillehammer, Norway	10 km Pursuit F	World Cup	2nd
14	1992–93	10 March 1993	Štrbské Pleso, Slovakia	10 km Individual C	World Cup	3rd
15	1993–94	18 December 1993	Davos, Switzerland	10 km Individual F	World Cup	3rd
16	1993–94	21 December 1993	Toblach, Italy	15 km Individual C	World Cup	1st
17	1993–94	15 January 1994	Oslo, Norway	15 km Individual F	World Cup	2nd
18	1993–94	13 February 1994	Lillehammer, Norway	15 km Individual F	Olympic Games^{[1]}	1st
19	1993–94	15 February 1994	Lillehammer, Norway	5 km Individual C	Olympic Games^{[1]}	2nd
20	1993–94	17 February 1994	Lillehammer, Norway	10 km Pursuit F	Olympic Games^{[1]}	2nd
21	1993–94	24 February 1994	Lillehammer, Norway	30 km Individual CF	Olympic Games^{[1]}	1st
22	1993–94	6 March 1994	Lahti, Finland	30 km Individual F	World Cup	1st
23	1993–94	12 March 1994	Falun, Sweden	10 km Individual F	World Cup	1st
24	1993–94	20 March 1994	Thunder Bay, Canada	10 km Pursuit F	World Cup	1st
25	1994–95	12 March 1995	Thunder Bay, Canada	5 km Individual C	World Championships^{[1]}	3rd
26	1994–95	18 March 1995	Thunder Bay, Canada	30 km Individual F	World Championships^{[1]}	2nd
27	1995–96	9 December 1995	Davos, Switzerland	5 km Individual F	World Cup	3rd
28	1995–96	9 January 1996	Štrbské Pleso, Slovakia	30 km Individual F	World Cup	1st
29	1995–96	18 March 1995	Nové Město, Czech Republic	10 km Individual C	World Cup	2nd
30	1995–96	2 February 1996	Seefeld, Austria	5 km Individual F	World Cup	1st
31	1995–96	11 February 1996	Kavgolovo, Russia	10 km Individual C	World Cup	1st
32	1995–96	24 February 1996	Trondheim, Norway	5 km Individual C	World Cup	1st
33	1995–96	25 February 1996	Trondheim, Norway	10 km Pursuit F	World Cup	1st
34	1995–96	2 March 1996	Lahti, Finland	10 km Individual F	World Cup	1st
35	1995–96	9 March 1996	Falun, Sweden	15 km Individual F	World Cup	1st

==== Team podiums ====
- 1 victory – (1 TS)
- 9 podiums – (8 RL, 1 TS)

No.	Season	Date	Location	Race	Level	Place	Teammate(s)
1	1990–91	15 February 1991	Val di Fiemme, Italy	4 × 5 km Relay C/F	World Championships^{[1]}	2nd	Vanzetta / Paruzzi / Belmondo
2	1991–92	18 February 1992	Albertville, France	4 × 5 km Relay C/F	Olympic Games^{[1]}	3rd	Vanzetta / Paruzzi / Belmondo
3	1992–93	26 February 1993	Falun, Sweden	4 × 5 km Relay C/F	World Championships^{[1]}	2nd	Vanzetta / Paruzzi / Belmondo
4	1993–94	22 February 1994	Lillehammer, Norway	4 × 5 km Relay C/F	Olympic Games^{[1]}	3rd	Vanzetta / Paruzzi / Belmondo
5	1995–96	17 December 1995	Santa Caterina, Italy	4 × 5 km Relay C	World Cup	2nd	Paluselli / Belmondo / Paruzzi
6	1995–96	14 January 1996	Nové Město, Czech Republic	4 × 5 km Relay C	World Cup	3rd	Paluselli / Belmondo / Paruzzi
7	1995–96	3 February 1996	Seefeld, Austria	6 × 1.5 km Team Sprint F	World Cup	1st	Belmondo
8	1995–96	10 March 1996	Falun, Sweden	4 × 5 km Relay C/F	World Cup	3rd	Giacomuzzi / Dal Sasso / Belmondo
9	1997–98	14 December 1997	Val di Fiemme, Italy	4 × 5 km Relay F	World Cup	2nd	Paruzzi / Valbusa / Belmondo

Note: ^{1} Until the 1999 World Championships and the 1994 Olympics, World Championship and Olympic races were included in the World Cup scoring system.

== National titles ==
- Italian Mountain Running Championships
  - Mountain running: 1985, 1989, 1991 (3)

== Politics ==
Manuela Di Centa, who has been vice-president of the National Council of the Italian National Olympic Committee (CONI) until 2006, is also involved in politics and was a member of the Chamber of Deputies for Forza Italia, between 2006 and 2013. She became a member of the International Olympic Committee in 1999 and remained there until 2010. She currently serves as the head of the Olympic organizing committee for the 2028 Winter Youth Olympics.

== Doping allegations ==
The Swedish investigative television programme Uppdrag granskning claimed that Di Centa had an exceptionally high haemoglobin level prior to a World Cup in Lahti in 1997. Di Centa's haemoglobin value was measured in an official pre-competition test as high as 17.3 g/dL. The allowed limit to start in an official FIS competition is 16.5 g/dL.

== See also ==
- List of athletes with the most appearances at Olympic Games
- Italian sportswomen multiple medalists at Olympics and World Championships
