= Antonella Confortola =

Italian competitive cross-country skier

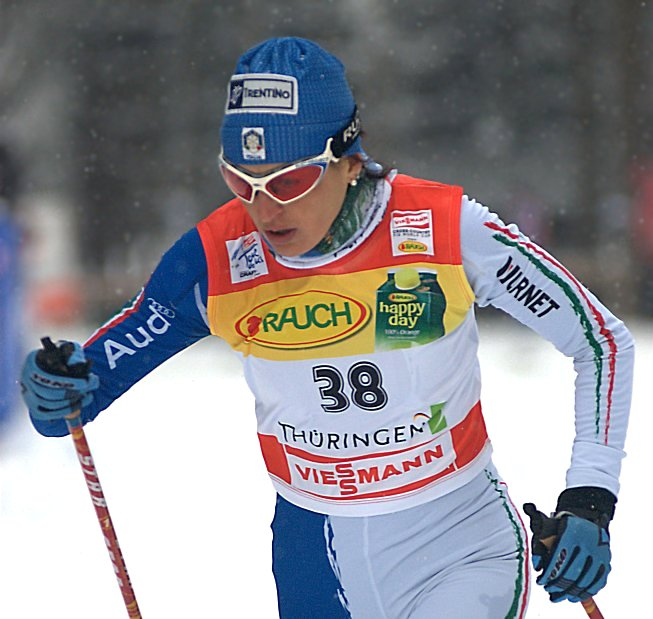
- Antonella Confortola in 2010

Personal information
- Nationality: Italy
- Born: 16 October 1975 (age 50) Cavalese, Italy

Sport
- Sport: Skiing
- Club: G.S. Forestale

World Cup career
- Seasons: 19 – (1994–2012)
- Indiv. starts: 191
- Indiv. podiums: 0
- Team starts: 42
- Team podiums: 9
- Team wins: 0
- Overall titles: 0 – (26th in 2004)
- Discipline titles: 0
Medal record
Women's cross-country skiing
Representing Italy
Olympic Games
Bronze medal – third place	2006 Turin	4 × 5 km relay
World Championships
Silver medal – second place	1999 Ramsau	4 × 5 km relay
Bronze medal – third place	2005 Oberstdorf	4 × 5 km relay
Mountain running
World Championships
Silver medal – second place	2002 Innsbruck	Individual
World Long Distance Championships
Gold medal – first place	2013 Szklarska	Team
Gold medal – first place	2013 Szklarska	Individual
Gold medal – first place	2016 Podbrdo	Team
Gold medal – first place	2017 Premana	Team
Silver medal – second place	2014 Manitou Springs	Team
Silver medal – second place	2016 Podbrdo	Individual
Skyrunning
World Championships
Silver medal – second place	2010 Canazei	Vertical Km
European Championships
Gold medal – first place	2009 Canazei	SkyRace
Gold medal – first place	2009 Canazei	Vertical Kilometer
Gold medal – first place	2013 Canazei	Vertical Kilometer

Antonella Confortola Wyatt (born 16 October 1975) is an Italian former cross-country skier and mountain runner.

== Biography ==
Confortola was born in Cavalese. She is the granddaughter of Italian cross-country skier and Olympian Silvio Confortola.

== Cross-country skiing ==
Confortola competed at the Olympics four times between 1998 and 2010. She earned a bronze medal in the 4 × 5 km relay at the 2006 Winter Olympics in Turin. Her best individual finish was 16th in the 15 km event at the 2002 Winter Olympics in Salt Lake City.

Confortola earned two medals in the 4 × 5 km relay at the FIS Nordic World Ski Championships (silver: 1999, bronze: 2005). Her best individual finish was a 15th in the 30 km in 2003. She won two individual races (5 km, 10 km) at the Continental Cup in 2004 in Italy.

== Mountain running ==
Confortola has also competed in mountain running. She took fourth place at the 2010 European Mountain Running Championships in Bulgaria and the silver medal at the 2011 European Mountain Running Championships in Turkey.

== Personal life ==
Confortola is married to New Zealand runner Jonathan Wyatt. They live in northern Italy with their daughter.

== Cross-country skiing results ==
All results are sourced from the International Ski Federation (FIS).

=== Olympic Games ===
- 1 medal – (1 bronze)

Year	Age	5 km	10 km	15 km	Pursuit	30 km	Sprint	4 × 5 km relay	Team sprint
1998	22	—	—N/a	27	—	20	—N/a	—	—N/a
2002	26	—N/a	34	16	—	19	—	—	—N/a
2006	30	—N/a	34	—N/a	22	DNF	—	3rd	—
2010	34	—N/a	—	—N/a	—	16	—	—	—

=== World Championships ===
- 2 medals – (1 silver, 1 bronze)

Year	Age	5 km	10 km	15 km	Pursuit	30 km	Sprint	4 × 5 km relay	Team sprint
1999	23	—	—N/a	27	—	39	—N/a	2nd	—N/a
2003	27	—N/a	—	22	—	15	—	7	—N/a
2005	29	—N/a	21	—N/a	18	20	—	3rd	—
2007	32	—N/a	23	—N/a	35	14	—	—	—
2009	34	—N/a	—	—N/a	16	15	—	5	—
2011	36	—N/a	—	—N/a	—	9	—	4	—

=== World Cup ===
Season	Age	Discipline standings					Ski Tour standings		
Season	Age	Overall	Distance	Long Distance	Middle Distance	Sprint	Nordic Opening	Tour de Ski	World Cup Final
1994	18	NC	—N/a	—N/a	—N/a	—N/a	—N/a	—N/a	—N/a
1995	19	NC	—N/a	—N/a	—N/a	—N/a	—N/a	—N/a	—N/a
1996	20	NC	—N/a	—N/a	—N/a	—N/a	—N/a	—N/a	—N/a
1997	21	NC	—N/a	NC	—N/a	—	—N/a	—N/a	—N/a
1998	22	53	—N/a	37	—N/a	66	—N/a	—N/a	—N/a
1999	23	37	—N/a	27	—N/a	56	—N/a	—N/a	—N/a
2000	24	42	—N/a	24	44	NC	—N/a	—N/a	—N/a
2001	25	74	—N/a	—N/a	—N/a	DNF	—N/a	—N/a	—N/a
2002	26	56	—N/a	—N/a	—N/a	—	—N/a	—N/a	—N/a
2003	27	38	—N/a	—N/a	—N/a	—	—N/a	—N/a	—N/a
2004	28	26	19	—N/a	—N/a	—	—N/a	—N/a	—N/a
2005	29	78	50	—N/a	—N/a	—	—N/a	—N/a	—N/a
2006	30	57	41	—N/a	—N/a	—	—N/a	—N/a	—N/a
2007	31	51	32	—N/a	—N/a	NC	—N/a	DNF	—N/a
2008	32	28	24	—N/a	—N/a	49	—N/a	21	16
2009	33	43	30	—N/a	—N/a	NC	—N/a	28	DNF
2010	34	58	34	—N/a	—N/a	NC	—N/a	DNF	—
2011	35	89	62	—N/a	—N/a	NC	36	—	—
2012	36	NC	NC	—N/a	—N/a	—	—	—	—

==== Team Podiums ====
- 9 podiums – (9 RL)

No.	Season	Date	Location	Race	Level	Place	Teammates
1	1998–99	20 December 1998	Davos, Switzerland	4 × 5 km Relay C/F	World Cup	2nd	Paruzzi / Belmondo / Valbusa
2	1998–99	10 January 1999	Nové Město, Czech Republic	4 × 5 km Relay C/F	World Cup	3rd	Paruzzi / Belmondo / Valbusa
3	1998–99	26 February 1999	Ramsau, Austria	4 × 5 km Relay C/F	World Championships (Note: Until the 1999 World Championships, World Championship races were included in the World Cup scoring system.)	2nd	Valbusa / Paruzzi / Belmondo
4	1998–99	14 March 1999	Falun, Sweden	4 × 5 km Relay C/F	World Cup	3rd	Valbusa / Paruzzi / Belmondo
5	1999–00	27 February 2000	Falun, Sweden	4 × 5 km Relay F	World Cup	3rd	Paruzzi / Valbusa / Belmondo
6	1999–00	4 March 2000	Lahti, Finland	4 × 5 km Relay C/F	World Cup	3rd	Santer / Paruzzi / Valbusa
7	2002–03	23 March 2003	Falun, Sweden	4 × 5 km Relay C/F	World Cup	3rd	Valbusa / Paruzzi / Follis
8	2003–04	7 February 2004	La Clusaz, France	4 × 5 km Relay C/F	World Cup	3rd	Longa / Paruzzi / Valbusa
9	2009–10	7 March 2010	Lahti, Finland	4 × 5 km Relay C/F	World Cup	3rd	Longa / Valbusa / Follis

=== Italian Championships ===
- 1998: 2nd, Italian women's championships of cross-country skiing, 15 km
- 1999:
  - 3rd, Italian women's championships of cross-country skiing, 15 km
  - 3rd, Italian women's championships of cross-country skiing, 10 km
- 2002:
  - 3rd, Italian women's championships of cross-country skiing, 30 km
  - 3rd, Italian women's championships of cross-country skiing, 5 km pursuit
- 2003:
  - 2nd, Italian women's championships of cross-country skiing, 30 km
  - 2nd, Italian women's championships of cross-country skiing, 10 km free & duathlon
  - 2nd, Italian women's championships of cross-country skiing, 5 km pursuit
- 2004:
  - 3rd, Italian women's championships of cross-country skiing, 15 km
  - 3rd, Italian women's championships of cross-country skiing, 10 km
- 2005: 3rd, Italian women's championships of cross-country skiing, 10 km
- 2007: 2nd, Italian women's championships of cross-country skiing, 30 km
- 2008:
  - 2nd, Italian women's championships of cross-country skiing, 2 x 7.5 km pursuit
  - 2nd, Italian women's championships of cross-country skiing, 10 km
  - 3rd, Italian women's championships of cross-country skiing, 30 km
- 2009:
  - 2nd, Italian women's championships of cross-country skiing, 2 x 7.5 km pursuit
  - 2nd, Italian women's championships of cross-country skiing, 10 km
- 2010: 2nd, Italian women's championships of cross-country skiing, 30 km

== Mountain running ==
=== Team results ===
- World Mountain Running Championships
  - (gold) 2002, 2004, 2010, 2011, 2013, 2014, 2016 (7)

=== National titles ===
- Italian Mountain Running Championships
  - Mountain running: 2003, 2011, 2012 (3)
- Italian Vertical Kilometer Championships
  - Vertical kilometer: 2014

== Other results ==
Nuten Opp

- (gold) 2008, 2009, 2010

== See also ==
- List of multi-sport athletes - Skyrunning
