= Valbusa =

Valbusa is a surname. Notable people with the surname include:

- Fulvio Valbusa (born 1969), Italian cross-country skier
- Sabina Valbusa (born 1972), Italian cross-country skier
