= Cristina Paluselli =

Italian cross-country skier

Personal information
- Nationality: Italy
- Born: 23 October 1973 (age 52) Trento, Italy

Sport
- Sport: Skiing
- Club: G.S. Forestale

World Cup career
- Seasons: 13 – (1994–2006)
- Indiv. starts: 106
- Indiv. podiums: 0
- Team starts: 23
- Team podiums: 6
- Team wins: 2
- Overall titles: 0 – (30th in 2001)
- Discipline titles: 0
Medal record
Women's cross-country skiing
Representing Italy
World Championships
| Bronze medal – third place | 2001 Lahti | 4 × 5 km relay |

Cristina Paluselli (born 23 October 1973) is a former professional Italian cross-country skier.

== Biography ==
Paluselli won ten FIS Worldloppet Cup races, and was ranked first for two consecutive years, during the 2004 and 2005.

As member of the Italian National Team, she won a bronze medal in the 4 × 5 km relay at the 2001 FIS Nordic World Ski Championships in Lahti and had her best individual finish of 16th in the 15 km at the 2003 FIS Nordic World Ski Championships.

Paluselli's best individual finish at the Winter Olympics was 39th in the 10 km both in 2002 and 2006. She has eleven individual victories at various distances, mainly at the FIS Marathon Cup, from 2002 to 2006. She was the winner in the most prestigious ski marathons such as Jizerska Padesatka, Bedřichov, Oberammergau, Marcialonga, Livigno, Rena - Lillehammer, and Vasaloppet. Her Vasaloppet victory came in 2005.

== Cross-country skiing results ==
All results are sourced from the International Ski Federation (FIS).

=== Olympic Games ===
| Year | Age | 10 km | 15 km | Pursuit | 30 km | Sprint | 4 × 5 km relay | Team sprint |
|---|---|---|---|---|---|---|---|---|
| 2002 | 28 | 39 | — | 53 | — | — | — | —N/a |
| 2006 | 32 | 39 | —N/a | — | — | — | — | — |

=== World Championships ===
- 1 medal – (1 bronze)

| Year | Age | 5 km | 10 km | 15 km | Pursuit | 30 km | Sprint | 4 × 5 km relay |
|---|---|---|---|---|---|---|---|---|
| 1995 | 21 | — | —N/a | 34 | — | — | —N/a | — |
| 2001 | 27 | —N/a | 40 | 19 | 25 | CNX^{[a]} | — | Bronze |
| 2003 | 29 | —N/a | — | 16 | — | — | — | 7 |

a. ^{1} Cancelled due to extremely cold weather.

=== World Cup ===
==== Season standings ====
| Season | Age | | | | | |
| Season | Age | Overall | Distance | Long Distance | Middle Distance | Sprint |
|---|---|---|---|---|---|---|
| 1994 | 20 | NC | —N/a | —N/a | —N/a | —N/a |
| 1995 | 21 | 43 | —N/a | —N/a | —N/a | —N/a |
| 1996 | 22 | 43 | —N/a | —N/a | —N/a | —N/a |
| 1997 | 23 | 58 | —N/a | NC | —N/a | 45 |
| 1998 | 24 | 60 | —N/a | 39 | —N/a | — |
| 1999 | 25 | NC | —N/a | NC | —N/a | — |
| 2000 | 26 | 59 | —N/a | 36 | 48 | — |
| 2001 | 27 | 30 | —N/a | —N/a | —N/a | 47 |
| 2002 | 28 | 58 | —N/a | —N/a | —N/a | NC |
| 2003 | 29 | 59 | —N/a | —N/a | —N/a | NC |
| 2004 | 30 | 62 | 43 | —N/a | —N/a | — |
| 2005 | 31 | NC | — | —N/a | —N/a | NC |
| 2006 | 32 | 126 | 94 | —N/a | —N/a | — |

==== Team podiums ====
- 2 victories – (2 RL)
- 6 podiums – (6 RL)

| No. | Season | Date | Location | Race | Level | Place | Teammates |
|---|---|---|---|---|---|---|---|
| 1 | 1994–95 | 7 February 1995 | Hamar, Norway | 4 × 5 km Relay C/F | World Cup | 3rd | Valbusa / Dal Sasso / Belmondo |
| 2 | 1995–96 | 17 December 1995 | Santa Caterina, Italy | 4 × 5 km Relay C | World Cup | 2nd | Belmondo / Paruzzi / Di Centa |
| 3 | 1995–96 | 14 January 1996 | Nové Město, Czech Republic | 4 × 5 km Relay C | World Cup | 3rd | Belmondo / Paruzzi / Di Centa |
| 4 | 2000–01 | 13 January 2001 | Soldier Hollow, United States | 4 × 5 km Relay C/F | World Cup | 1st | Valbusa / Paruzzi / Belmondo |
| 5 | 2001–02 | 16 December 2001 | Davos, Switzerland | 4 × 5 km Relay C/F | World Cup | 3rd | Paruzzi / Follis / Belmondo |
| 6 | 2001–02 | 10 March 2002 | Falun, Sweden | 4 × 5 km Relay C/F | World Cup | 1st | Valbusa / Paruzzi / Belmondo |
