= Stefania Belmondo =

Italian cross-country skier (born 1969)

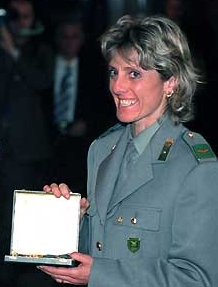

Personal information
- Nationality: Italy
- Born: 13 January 1969 (age 57) Vinadio, Cuneo, Italy
- Height: 158 cm (5 ft 2 in)

Sport
- Sport: Skiing
- Club: G.S. Forestale

World Cup career
- Seasons: 14 – (1989–2002)
- Indiv. starts: 162
- Indiv. podiums: 66
- Indiv. wins: 23
- Team starts: 47
- Team podiums: 27
- Team wins: 4
- Overall titles: 0 – (2nd in 1991, 1992, 1997 & 1999)
- Discipline titles: 1 – (1 SP: 1997)
Medal record
Women's cross-country skiing
Representing Italy
Olympic Games
Gold medal – first place	1992 Albertville	30 km freestyle
Gold medal – first place	2002 Salt Lake City	15 km freestyle
Silver medal – second place	1992 Albertville	5 km + 10 km combined pursuit
Silver medal – second place	1998 Nagano	30 km freestyle
Silver medal – second place	2002 Salt Lake City	30 km classical
Bronze medal – third place	1992 Albertville	4 × 5 km relay
Bronze medal – third place	1994 Lillehammer	5 km + 10 km combined pursuit
Bronze medal – third place	1994 Lillehammer	4 × 5 km relay
Bronze medal – third place	1998 Nagano	4 × 5 km relay
Bronze medal – third place	2002 Salt Lake City	10 km classical
World Championships
Gold medal – first place	1993 Falun	5 km + 10 km combined pursuit
Gold medal – first place	1993 Falun	30 km freestyle
Gold medal – first place	1999 Ramsau	5 km + 10 km combined pursuit
Gold medal – first place	1999 Ramsau	15 km freestyle
Silver medal – second place	1991 Val di Fiemme	4 × 5 km relay
Silver medal – second place	1993 Falun	4 5 km relay
Silver medal – second place	1997 Trondheim	5 km classical
Silver medal – second place	1997 Trondheim	15 km freestyle
Silver medal – second place	1997 Trondheim	30 km classical
Silver medal – second place	1997 Trondheim	5 km + 10 km combined pursuit
Silver medal – second place	1999 Ramsau	4 × 5 km relay
Bronze medal – third place	1991 Val di Fiemme	15 km classical
Bronze medal – third place	2001 Lahti	4 × 5 km relay
Junior World Championships
Gold medal – first place	1989 Vang	5 km classical
Gold medal – first place	1989 Vang	15 km freestyle
Bronze medal – third place	1988 Saalfelden	5 km classical
Bronze medal – third place	1988 Saalfelden	3 × 5 km relay

Stefania Belmondo (affectionately known as the Tiny Tornado, born 13 January 1969) is an Italian former cross-country skier, a two-time Olympic champion and four-time world champion.

== Biography ==
=== Debut ===
Belmondo was born in Vinadio, in the province of Cuneo (Piedmont), the daughter of a housewife and an electric company employee. In her career she skied with the G.S. Forestale.

She started to ski at the age of three in the Piedmontese mountains of her native city. She made her debut at the FIS Nordic World Ski Championships in 1987. The next season she joined the main national team of Italy, and then participated in the 1988 Winter Olympics, held in Calgary, Alberta, Canada. In 1989, she won a World Cup event for the first time, in Salt Lake City, and ended that season second overall.

=== Early success, injury, return ===
At the 1991 FIS Nordic World Ski Championships, she won a bronze medal in the 15 km trial, and a silver in the 4 × 5 km relay. The 1992 Winter Olympics in Albertville brought the first gold medal for Belmondo, in the 30 km specialty. At the 1993 FIS Nordic World Ski Championships, she won golds in the 5 km + 10 km combined pursuit and the 30 km, and a silver in the 4 × 5 km relay, before an injury to her right hallux required surgery, and caused a 4-month absence from competition.

After a second operation, Belmondo participated in the 1994 Winter Olympics in Lillehammer, gaining just two bronze medals; after this disappointing performance she decided to continue skiing, against the advice of her physician. The 1996–97 season was one of her best since the surgeries, when she won four silver medals (5 km, 15 km, 30 km), all were behind Russian Yelena Välbe though she tied with Välbe in the 5 km + 10 km combined pursuit event. In the 1998 Winter Olympics in Nagano, Japan, she won a third place with the 4 × 5 km relay, and an individual silver in the 30 km. The bronze medal in the relay was remarkable because the Italian team was ninth as Belmondo started the last leg. The 1999 FIS Nordic World Ski Championships saw Stefania Belmondo win two gold medals (5 km + 10 km combined pursuit, 15 km) and a silver (4 × 5 km relay).

In her final year of competition, 2002, she won a gold medal, as well as a silver and a bronze, in the Winter Olympics. She concluded that year's World Cup in third place.

=== Other career successes ===
- Belmondo also found success at the Holmenkollen ski festival, winning the 30 km women's event twice (1997, 2002).
- She is the one of only two women to ever win the 30 km Olympic, World Championship, and Holmenkollen events (Norway's Marit Bjørgen is the other).
- Belmondo earned the Holmenkollen medal in 1997 (shared with Bjarte Engen Vik and Bjørn Dæhlie).

=== 1997 World Championships ===
In the 15 km (9 mi) pursuit event at the 1997 World Championships in Trondheim the organizers had to resort to Photo finish to determine who between Belmondo and Yelena Välbe had won the race. Eventually the gold medal is awarded to the Russian and the Italian Silver for just 2 cm (0.8 in), both athletes are still credited the same time.

=== 2006 Winter Olympics ===
At the 2006 Winter Olympics in Turin, in her native region of Piedmont, she lit the Olympic Flame at the opening ceremony. During the 2006 Winter Olympics, Belmondo had a series of webpages on the 2006 Turin Winter Olympic Games website regarding her reaction and emotions during the games.

== Personal life ==
Belmondo is a mother and has kids.

== Cross-country skiing results ==
All results are sourced from the International Ski Federation (FIS).

=== Olympic Games ===
- 10 medals – (2 gold, 3 silver, 5 bronze)

Year	Age	5 km	10 km	15 km	Pursuit	20 km	30 km	Sprint	4 × 5 km relay
1988	19	—	19	—N/a	—N/a	29	—N/a	—N/a	10
1992	23	4	—N/a	5	Silver	—N/a	Gold	—N/a	Bronze
1994	25	13	—N/a	4	Bronze	—N/a	—	—N/a	Bronze
1998	29	12	—N/a	8	5	—N/a	Silver	—N/a	Bronze
2002	33	—N/a	Bronze	Gold	11	—N/a	Silver	—	6

=== World Championships ===
- 13 medals – (4 gold, 7 silver, 2 bronze)

Year	Age	5 km	10 km classical	10 km freestyle	15 km	Pursuit	30 km	Sprint	4 × 5 km relay
1989	20	—N/a	11	10	—	—N/a	—	—N/a	6
1991	22	10	—N/a	7	Bronze	—N/a	4	—N/a	Silver
1993	24	5	—N/a	—N/a	6	Gold	Gold	—N/a	Silver
1995	26	8	—N/a	—N/a	12	5	—	—N/a	4
1997	28	Silver	—N/a	—N/a	Silver	Silver	Silver	—N/a	4
1999	30	8	—N/a	—N/a	Gold	Gold	13	—N/a	Silver
2001	32	—N/a	4	—N/a	4	8	CNX^{[a]}	—	Bronze

a. ^{1} Cancelled due to extremely cold weather.

=== World Cup ===
==== Season titles ====
- 1 title – (1 sprint)

Season
Season	Discipline
1997	Sprint

==== Season standings ====
Season	Age				
Season	Age	Overall	Long Distance	Middle Distance	Sprint
1989	20	13	—N/a	—N/a	—N/a
1990	21	8	—N/a	—N/a	—N/a
1991	22	2nd place, silver medalist(s)	—N/a	—N/a	—N/a
1992	23	2nd place, silver medalist(s)	—N/a	—N/a	—N/a
1993	24	3rd place, bronze medalist(s)	—N/a	—N/a	—N/a
1994	25	4	—N/a	—N/a	—N/a
1995	26	7	—N/a	—N/a	—N/a
1996	27	6	—N/a	—N/a	—N/a
1997	28	2nd place, silver medalist(s)	2nd place, silver medalist(s)	—N/a	1st place, gold medalist(s)
1998	29	3rd place, bronze medalist(s)	3rd place, bronze medalist(s)	—N/a	3rd place, bronze medalist(s)
1999	30	2nd place, silver medalist(s)	2nd place, silver medalist(s)	—N/a	5
2000	31	6	7	2nd place, silver medalist(s)	37
2001	32	4	—N/a	—N/a	7
2002	33	3rd place, bronze medalist(s)	—N/a	—N/a	NC

==== Individual podiums ====
- 23 victories
- 66 podiums

No.	Season	Date	Location	Race	Level	Place
1	1989–90	10 December 1989	Soldier Hollow, United States	15 km Individual F	World Cup	1st
2	1990–91	8 December 1990	Tauplitzalm, Austria	10 km + 15 km Pursuit C/F	World Cup	1st
3	1990–91	20 December 1990	Les Saisies, France	5 km + 10 km Pursuit C/F	World Cup	2nd
4	1990–91	8 February 1991	Val di Fiemme, Italy	15 km Individual C	World Championships^{[1]}	3rd
5	1991–92	7 December 1991	Silver Star, Canada	5 km Individual C	World Cup	2nd
6	1991–92	8 December 1991	Silver Star, Canada	10 km Pursuit C	World Cup	1st
7	1991–92	8 December 1991	Cogne, Italy	30 km Individual F	World Cup	1st
8	1991–92	15 February 1992	Albertville, France	10 km Pursuit F	Olympic Games^{[1]}	2nd
9	1991–92	21 February 1992	Albertville, France	30 km Individual F	Olympic Games^{[1]}	1st
10	1991–92	1 March 1992	Lahti, Finland	30 km Individual C	World Cup	1st
11	1991–92	14 March 1992	Vang, Norway	15 km Individual F	World Cup	3rd
12	1992–93	9 January 1993	Ulrichen, Switzerland	10 km Individual C	World Cup	3rd
13	1992–93	16 January 1993	Cogne, Italy	10 km Individual F	World Cup	1st
14	1992–93	23 February 1993	Falun, Sweden	10 km Pursuit F	World Championships^{[1]}	1st
15	1992–93	27 February 1993	Falun, Sweden	30 km Individual F	World Championships^{[1]}	1st
16	1992–93	6 March 1993	Lahti, Finland	5 km Individual F	World Cup	3rd
17	1993–94	11 December 1993	Santa Caterina, Italy	5 km Individual C	World Cup	3rd
18	1993–94	18 December 1993	Davos, Switzerland	10 km Individual F	World Cup	2nd
19	1993–94	17 February 1994	Lillehammer, Norway	10 km Pursuit F	Olympic Games^{[1]}	3rd
20	1993–94	6 March 1994	Lahti, Finland	30 km Individual F	World Cup	3rd
21	1994–95	7 January 1995	Östersund, Sweden	30 km Individual F	World Cup	2nd
22	1995–96	29 November 1995	Gällivare, Sweden	10 km Individual F	World Cup	1st
23	1995–96	9 January 1996	Štrbské Pleso, Slovakia	30 km Individual F	World Cup	3rd
24	1995–96	2 February 1996	Seefeld, Austria	5 km Individual F	World Cup	2nd
25	1995–96	2 March 1996	Lahti, Finland	10 km Individual F	World Cup	2nd
26	1996–97	23 November 1996	Kiruna, Sweden	5 km Individual F	World Cup	2nd
27	1996–97	7 December 1996	Davos, Switzerland	10 km Individual C	World Cup	1st
28	1996–97	14 December 1996	Brusson, Italy	15 km Individual F	World Cup	1st
29	1996–97	11 January 1997	Hakuba, Japan	5 km Individual C	World Cup	1st
30	1996–97	12 January 1997	Hakuba, Japan	10 km Pursuit F	World Cup	1st
31	1996–97	18 January 1997	Lahti, Finland	15 km Individual C	World Cup	3rd
32	1996–97	21 February 1997	Trondheim, Norway	15 km Individual F	World Championships^{[1]}	2nd
33	1996–97	23 February 1997	Trondheim, Norway	5 km Individual C	World Championships^{[1]}	2nd
34	1996–97	24 February 1997	Trondheim, Norway	10 km Pursuit F	World Championships^{[1]}	2nd
35	1996–97	1 March 1997	Trondheim, Norway	30 km Individual C	World Championships^{[1]}	2nd
36	1996–97	8 March 1997	Falun, Sweden	5 km Individual F	World Cup	2nd
37	1996–97	15 March 1997	Oslo, Norway	30 km Individual F	World Cup	1st
38	1997–98	16 December 1997	Val di Fiemme, Italy	15 km Individual F	World Cup	3rd
39	1997–98	4 January 1998	Kavgolovo, Russia	10 km Individual F	World Cup	2nd
40	1997–98	11 January 1998	Ramsau, Austria	10 km Pursuit F	World Cup	1st
41	1997–98	7 March 1998	Lahti, Finland	15 km Individual F	World Cup	1st
42	1997–98	11 March 1998	Falun, Sweden	5 km Individual F	World Cup	2nd
43	1998–99	28 November 1998	Muonio, Finland	5 km Individual F	World Cup	2nd
44	1998–99	12 January 1999	Nové Město, Czech Republic	15 km Individual F	World Cup	2nd
45	1998–99	14 February 1999	Seefeld, Austria	5 km Individual F	World Cup	3rd
46	1998–99	19 February 1999	Ramsau, Austria	15 km Individual F	World Championships^{[1]}	1st
47	1998–99	23 February 1999	Ramsau, Austria	10 km Pursuit F	World Championships^{[1]}	1st
48	1998–99	20 March 1999	Oslo, Norway	30 km Individual C	World Cup	3rd
49	1999–00	2 February 2000	Trondheim, Norway	5 km Individual F	World Cup	1st
50	1999–00	16 February 2000	Ulrichen, Switzerland	5 km Individual F	World Cup	2nd
51	1999–00	20 February 2000	Transjurassienne, France	44 km Mass Start F	World Cup	1st
52	1999–00	26 February 2000	Falun, Sweden	10 km Individual F	World Cup	2nd
53	1999–00	18 March 2000	Bormio, Italy	10 km Pursuit F	World Cup	2nd
54	2000–01	25 November 2000	Beitostølen, Norway	10 km Individual C	World Cup	3rd
55	2000–01	29 November 2000	Beitostølen, Norway	5 km Individual F	World Cup	2nd
56	2000–01	8 December 2000	Santa Caterina, Italy	10 km Individual F	World Cup	2nd
57	2000–01	29 December 2000	Engelberg, Switzerland	1.0 km Sprint F	World Cup	3rd
58	2000–01	10 January 2001	Soldier Hollow, United States	5 km + 5 km Pursuit	World Cup	3rd
59	2000–01	4 March 2001	Kavgolovo, Russia	15 km Individual F	World Cup	3rd
60	2001–02	12 December 2001	Brusson, Italy	10 km Individual F	World Cup	2nd
61	2001–02	15 December 2001	Davos, Switzerland	10 km Individual C	World Cup	3rd
62	2001–02	22 December 2001	Ramsau, Austria	15 km Mass Start F	World Cup	2nd
63	2001–02	12 January 2002	Nové Město, Czech Republic	5 km Individual F	World Cup	3rd
64	2001–02	2 March 2002	Lahti, Finland	10 km Individual F	World Cup	2nd
65	2001–02	9 March 2002	Falun, Sweden	5 km + 5 km Pursuit C/F	World Cup	1st
66	2001–02	16 March 2002	Oslo, Norway	30 km Individual F	World Cup	1st

==== Team podiums ====
- 4 victories – (22 RL, 5 TS)
- 27 podiums – (24 RL, 4 TS)

No.	Season	Date	Location	Race	Level	Place	Teammate(s)
1	1990–91	15 February 1991	Val di Fiemme, Italy	4 × 5 km Relay C/F	World Championships^{[1]}	2nd	Vanzetta / Di Centa / Paruzzi
2	1991–92	18 February 1992	Albertville, France	4 × 5 km Relay C/F	Olympic Games^{[1]}	3rd	Vanzetta / Di Centa / Paruzzi
3	1992–93	26 February 1993	Falun, Sweden	4 × 5 km Relay C/F	World Championships^{[1]}	2nd	Vanzetta / Di Centa / Paruzzi
4	1993–94	22 February 1994	Lillehammer, Norway	4 × 5 km Relay C/F	Olympic Games^{[1]}	3rd	Vanzetta / Di Centa / Paruzzi
5	1994–95	7 February 1995	Hamar, Norway	4 × 3 km Relay F	World Cup	3rd	Valbusa / Dal Sasso / Paluselli
6	1995–96	17 December 1995	Santa Caterina, Italy	4 × 5 km Relay C	World Cup	2nd	Paluselli / Paruzzi / Di Centa
7	1995–96	14 January 1996	Nové Město, Czech Republic	4 × 5 km Relay C	World Cup	3rd	Paluselli / Paruzzi / Di Centa
8	1995–96	3 February 1996	Seefeld, Austria	6 × 1.5 km Team Sprint F	World Cup	1st	Di Centa
9	1995–96	10 March 1996	Falun, Sweden	4 × 5 km Relay C/F	World Cup	3rd	Giacomuzzi / Di Centa / Dal Sasso
10	1996–97	15 December 1996	Brusson, Italy	4 × 5 km Relay F	World Cup	3rd	Paruzzi / Valbusa / Dal Sasso
11	1996–97	19 January 1997	Lahti, Finland	8 × 1.5 km Team Sprint F	World Cup	1st	Valbusa
12	1996–97	16 March 1997	Oslo, Norway	4 × 5 km Relay F	World Cup	3rd	Paruzzi / Peyrot / Valbusa
13	1997–98	23 November 1997	Beitostølen, Norway	4 × 5 km Relay C	World Cup	3rd	Moroder / Valbusa / Paruzzi
14	1997–98	7 December 1997	Santa Caterina, Italy	4 × 5 km Relay F	World Cup	3rd	Paruzzi / Moroder / Valbusa
15	1997–98	14 December 1997	Val di Fiemme, Italy	4 × 5 km Relay F	World Cup	2nd	Paruzzi / Di Centa / Valbusa
16	1998–99	29 November 1998	Muonio, Finland	4 × 5 km Relay F	World Cup	2nd	Moroder / Paruzzi / Valbusa
17	1998–99	20 December 1998	Davos, Switzerland	4 × 5 km Relay C/F	World Cup	2nd	Paruzzi / Confortola / Valbusa
18	1998–99	10 January 1999	Nové Město, Czech Republic	4 × 5 km Relay C/F	World Cup	3rd	Paruzzi / Confortola / Valbusa
19	1998–99	26 February 1999	Ramsau, Austria	4 × 5 km Relay C/F	World Championships^{[1]}	2nd	Valbusa / Paruzzi / Confortola
20	1998–99	14 March 1999	Falun, Sweden	4 × 5 km Relay C/F	World Cup	3rd	Valbusa / Paruzzi / Confortola
21	1999–00	8 December 1999	Asiago, Italy	Team Sprint F	World Cup	2nd	Moroder
22	1999–00	27 February 2000	Falun, Sweden	4 × 5 km Relay F	World Cup	3rd	Paruzzi / Valbusa / Confortola
23	2000–01	13 December 2000	Clusone, Italy	6 × 1.5 km Team Sprint F	World Cup	2nd	Valbusa
24	2000–01	13 January 2001	Soldier Hollow, United States	4 × 5 km Relay C/F	World Cup	1st	Valbusa / Paruzzi / Paluselli
25	2001–02	16 December 2001	Davos, Switzerland	4 × 5 km Relay C/F	World Cup	3rd	Paluselli / Paruzzi / Follis
26	2001–02	2 March 2002	Lahti, Finland	4 × 1.5 km Team Sprint F	World Cup	3rd	Philippot
27	2001–02	10 March 2002	Falun, Sweden	4 × 5 km Relay C/F	World Cup	1st	Valbusa / Paruzzi / Paluselli

Note: ^{1} Until the 1999 World Championships and the 1994 Olympics, World Championship and Olympic races were included in the World Cup scoring system.

== See also ==
- List of multiple Winter Olympic medalists
- Italian sportswomen multiple medalists at Olympics and World Championships

Awards
Preceded by Giovanna Trillini; Deborah Compagnoni; Valentina Vezzali	Italian Sportswoman of the Year; 1993; 1999; 2002	Succeeded by Manuela Di Centa; Valentina Vezzali; Valentina Vezzali
Olympic Games
Preceded by Nikolaos Kaklamanakis	Final Olympic torchbearer Torino 2006	Succeeded by Li Ning
Preceded by 1980 USA men's ice hockey team	Final Winter Olympic torchbearer Torino 2006	Succeeded by Catriona Le May Doan, Steve Nash, Nancy Greene and Wayne Gretzky
