= Steger =

Steger can refer to:

== People ==
- Aleš Šteger (born 1973), Slovene poet, writer, editor and literary critic
- Bastian Steger (born 1981), German table tennis player
- Charles W. Steger (1947–2018), American academic, president of Virginia Polytechnic Institute and State University
- Christian Steger (born 1967), Italian skeleton racer
- Harry Peyton Steger (1883–1913), American writer and editor
- Herb Steger (1902–1968), American football player, coach and official
- Jason Steger (born 1956), British-Australian journalist
- Joseph A. Steger (1937–2013), president of the University of Cincinnati, Ohio
- Manfred Steger (born 1961), Austrian-American political scientist, professor at University of Hawaii
- Maurice Steger (born 1971), Swiss recorder player and conductor
- Meritt H. Steger (1906–1998), American lawyer, General Counsel of the Navy
- Michael Steger (born 1980), American actor
- Norbert Steger (born 1944), Austrian lawyer and politician
- Petra Steger (born 1987), Austrian politician
- Will Steger (born 1944), American polar explorer and environmentalist
- William Steger (1920–2006), American judge and politician

== Places ==
- Steger, Illinois

== See also ==
- Steeger, a surname
