= Steeger =

Steeger is a surname. Notable people with the surname include:

- Harry Steeger (1903–1990), co-founder of Popular Publications, one of the major publishers of pulp magazines
- Ingrid Steeger (1947–2023), German actress and comedian

== See also ==
- Steger (disambiguation)
