= Barbara Giacomuzzi =

Italian cross-country skier

Personal information
- Nationality: Italy
- Born: 3 September 1974 (age 51) Cortina d'Ampezzo, Italy

Sport
- Sport: Skiing

World Cup career
- Seasons: 3 – (1994–1996)
- Indiv. starts: 10
- Indiv. podiums: 0
- Team starts: 3
- Team podiums: 1
- Team wins: 0
- Overall titles: 0 – (38th in 1996)
Medal record
Women's cross-country skiing
Representing Italy
Junior World Championships
Bronze medal – third place	1994 Breitenwang	4 × 5 km relay

Barbara Giacomuzzi (born 3 September 1974) from Cortina d'Ampezzo is an Italian cross-country skier.

== Anti-doping rule violation ==
In July 2014, the Italian National Olympic Committee handed her a 3-month ban from sports for an anti-doping rule violation, after she had tested positive for betamethasone.

== Cross-country skiing results ==
All results are sourced from the International Ski Federation (FIS).

=== World Cup ===
==== Season standings ====
Season	Age	Overall
1994	19	NC
1995	20	NC
1996	21	38

==== Team podiums ====
- 1 podium

No.	Season	Date	Location	Race	Level	Place	Teammates
1	1995–96	10 March 1996	Falun, Sweden	4 × 5 km Relay C/F	World Cup	3rd	Di Centa / Dal Sasso / Belmondo

=== Other results ===
- 1995:
  - 1st, Cross-Country Skiing Continental Cup, 10 km classic, in Brusson
  - 1st, Continental Cup, 5 km classic, in Brusson
  - 2nd, Continental Cup, 5 km free, in Brusson
  - 2nd, Continental Cup, 10 km classic, in Seefeld
  - 3rd, FIS race, 5 km classic, in Kandersteg
  - 3rd, FIS race, 5 km free, in Rogla
- 1996:
  - 1st, Continental Cup, 10 km classic, in Campra
  - 1st, Continental Cup, 5 km classic, in Furtwangen
  - 2nd, Continental Cup, 10 km free, in Campra
  - 3rd, Italian women's championships of cross-country skiing, 30 km
