= Lara Peyrot =

Italian cross-country skier

Personal information
- Nationality: Italy
- Born: 2 May 1975 (age 51) Pinerolo, Italy

Sport
- Sport: Skiing
- Club: G.S. Fiamme Oro

World Cup career
- Seasons: 13 – (1994–2004, 2006–2007)
- Indiv. starts: 43
- Indiv. podiums: 0
- Team starts: 4
- Team podiums: 1
- Team wins: 0
- Overall titles: 0 – (74th in 2004)
- Discipline titles: 0
Medal record
Women's cross-country skiing
Representing Italy
Junior World Championships
Bronze medal – third place	1994 Breitenwang	4 × 5 km relay

Lara Peyrot (born 2 May 1975) is an Italian cross-country skier who competed in the 1990s and 2000s.

Peyrot was born in Pinerolo and lives in Prali-Ghigo.

== Cross-country skiing results ==
All results are sourced from the International Ski Federation (FIS).

=== World Cup ===
==== Season standings ====
Season	Age	Discipline standings					Ski Tour standings
Season	Age	Overall	Distance	Long Distance	Middle Distance	Sprint	Tour de Ski
1994	18	NC	—N/a	—N/a	—N/a	—N/a	—N/a
1995	19	NC	—N/a	—N/a	—N/a	—N/a	—N/a
1996	20	NC	—N/a	—N/a	—N/a	—N/a	—N/a
1997	21	NC	—N/a	NC	—N/a	—	—N/a
1998	22	75	—N/a	48	—N/a	—	—N/a
1999	23	NC	—N/a	NC	—N/a	—	—N/a
2000	24	NC	—N/a	—	NC	—	—N/a
2001	25	105	—N/a	—N/a	—N/a	77	—N/a
2002	26	NC	—N/a	—N/a	—N/a	—	—N/a
2003	27	NC	—N/a	—N/a	—N/a	—	—N/a
2004	28	74	54	—N/a	—N/a	—	—N/a
2006	30	NC	NC	—N/a	—N/a	—	—N/a
2007	31	NC	NC	—N/a	—N/a	—	—

==== Team podiums ====
- 1 podium

No.	Season	Date	Location	Race	Level	Place	Teammates
1	1996–97	16 March 1997	Oslo, Norway	4 × 5 km Relay F	World Cup	3rd	Paruzzi / Valbusa / Belmondo
