= Guidina Dal Sasso =

Italian cross-country skier

Personal information
- Nationality: Italy
- Born: 16 January 1958 (age 68) Asiago, Italy

Sport
- Sport: Skiing

World Cup career
- Seasons: 14 – (1982–1989, 1991, 1994–1998)
- Indiv. starts: 80
- Indiv. podiums: 0
- Team starts: 17
- Team podiums: 3
- Team wins: 0
- Overall titles: 0 – (11th in 1986)

Guidina Dal Sasso (born 16 January 1958) is an Italian cross-country skier and mountain runner who competed from 1982 to 2002. Her best World Cup finish was fourth twice, earning one each in 1985 and 1986. In 1985 she came third in the World Mountain Running Championships, and was a member of the winning team.

== Biography ==
Dal Sasso, born in Asiago, also competed in three Winter Olympics, earning her best finish of tenth in the 10 km event at Calgary in 1988. Her best finish at the FIS Nordic World Ski Championships was seventh in the 20 km event at Oberstdorf in 1987. She won five times the Marcialonga.

Dal Sasso has two children with Ferdinando Longo Borghini: Paolo and Elisa, both are professional cyclists.

== Achievements ==
Year	Competition	Venue	Sport	Result	Event	Time	Notes
1985	World championships	(Italy) San Vigilio di Marebbe	Mountain running	3rd	Individual race	26:24	
1985	World championships	(Italy) San Vigilio di Marebbe	Mountain running	1st	Team	9 points	
1985	Winter Universiade	(Italy) Belluno	Cross-country skiing	2nd	5 km	Unknown	
1985	Winter Universiade	(Italy) Belluno	Cross-country skiing	2nd	10 km	Unknown	

== Cross-country skiing results ==
All results are sourced from the International Ski Federation (FIS).

=== Olympic Games ===
Year	Age	5 km	10 km	15 km	Pursuit	20 km	30 km	4 × 5 km relay
1984	26	24	16	—N/a	—N/a	10	—N/a	9
1988	30	27	11	—N/a	—N/a	7	—N/a	10
1994	36	—	—N/a	—	—	—N/a	17	—

=== World Championships ===
Year	Age	5 km	10 km classical	10 km freestyle	15 km	Pursuit	20 km	30 km	4 × 5 km relay
1985	27	—	8	—N/a	—N/a	—N/a	14	—N/a	—
1987	29	—	15	—N/a	—N/a	—N/a	7	—N/a	5
1989	31	—N/a	30	31	—	—N/a	—N/a	—	—
1991	33	—	—N/a	—	15	—N/a	—N/a	—	—
1995	37	13	—N/a	—N/a	15	15	—N/a	8	4
1997	39	—	—N/a	—N/a	49	—	—N/a	—	—

=== World Cup ===
Season	Age	Overall	Long Distance	Sprint
1982	24	43	—N/a	—N/a
1983	25	28	—N/a	—N/a
1984	26	27	—N/a	—N/a
1985	27	28	—N/a	—N/a
1986	28	11	—N/a	—N/a
1987	29	20	—N/a	—N/a
1988	30	21	—N/a	—N/a
1989	31	29	—N/a	—N/a
1991	33	46	—N/a	—N/a
1994	36	28	—N/a	—N/a
1995	37	17	—N/a	—N/a
1996	38	30	—N/a	—N/a
1997	39	44	NC	31
1998	40	NC	NC	—

==== Team podiums ====
- 3 podiums – (3 RL)

No.	Season	Date	Location	Race	Level	Place	Teammates
1	1994–95	7 February 1995	Hamar, Norway	4 × 3 km Relay F	World Cup	3rd	Valbusa / Paluselli / Belmondo
2	1995–96	10 March 1996	Falun, Sweden	4 × 5 km Relay C/F	World Cup	3rd	Giacomuzzi / Di Centa / Belmondo
3	1996–97	15 December 1996	Brusson, Italy	4 × 5 km Relay F	World Cup	3rd	Paruzzi / Valbusa / Belmondo
