= Bice Vanzetta =

Italian cross-country skier (born 1961)

Personal information
- Nationality: Italy
- Born: 7 March 1961 (age 65) Cavalese, Italy

Sport
- Sport: Skiing
- Club: U.S. Cornacci

World Cup career
- Seasons: 8 – (1986–1988, 1990–1994)
- Indiv. starts: 36
- Indiv. podiums: 0
- Team starts: 8
- Team podiums: 4
- Team wins: 0
- Overall titles: 0 – (24th in 1993)
Medal record
Women's cross-country skiing
Representing Italy
Olympic Games
Bronze medal – third place	1992 Albertville	4 × 5 km relay
Bronze medal – third place	1994 Lillehammer	4 × 5 km relay
World Championships
Silver medal – second place	1991 Val di Fiemme	4 × 5 km relay
Silver medal – second place	1993 Falun	4 × 5 km relay

Bice Vanzetta (born 7 March 1961) is an Italian cross-country skier who competed from 1986 to 1994.

== Biography ==
She won two bronze medals at the Winter Olympics in the 4 × 5 km relay (1992, 1994). Vanzetta's best finish at the Winter Olympics was 19th in the 5 km event in 1994.

She also won two silver medals in the 4 × 5 km relay at the FIS Nordic World Ski Championships (1991, 1993). Vanzetta's best individual finish at the World Championships was 12th in the 5 km event in 1991.

Vanzetta's best career individual finish was third in an FIS race in 1992 in Italy.

She is the younger sister of four time Olympic medalist Giorgio Vanzetta.

== Cross-country skiing results ==
All results are sourced from the International Ski Federation (FIS).

=== Olympic Games ===
- 2 medals – (2 bronze)

Year	Age	5 km	10 km	15 km	Pursuit	20 km	30 km	4 × 5 km relay
1988	27	—	17	—N/a	—N/a	—	—N/a	—
1992	31	28	—N/a	DNF	20	—N/a	—	Bronze
1994	33	19	—N/a	—	34	—N/a	—	Bronze

=== World Championships ===
- 2 medals – (2 silver)

Year	Age	5 km	10 km	15 km	Pursuit	20 km	30 km	4 × 5 km relay
1987	26	13	24	—N/a	—N/a	13	—N/a	5
1991	30	12	—	23	—N/a	—N/a	—	Silver
1993	32	22	—N/a	26	29	—N/a	33	Silver

=== World Cup ===
==== Season standings ====
Season	Age	Overall
1986	25	48
1987	26	37
1988	27	NC
1990	28	NC
1991	29	42
1992	30	43
1993	31	24
1994	32	43

==== Team podiums ====
- 4 podiums

No.	Season	Date	Location	Race	Level	Place	Teammates
1	1990–91	15 February 1991	Val di Fiemme, Italy	4 × 5 km Relay C/F	World Championships^{[1]}	2nd	Di Centa / Paruzzi / Belmondo
2	1991–92	18 February 1992	Albertville, France	4 × 5 km Relay C/F	Olympic Games^{[1]}	3rd	Di Centa / Paruzzi / Belmondo
3	1992–93	26 February 1993	Falun, Sweden	4 × 5 km Relay C/F	World Championships^{[1]}	2nd	Di Centa / Paruzzi / Belmondo
4	1993–94	22 February 1994	Lillehammer, Norway	4 × 5 km Relay C/F	Olympic Games^{[1]}	3rd	Di Centa / Paruzzi / Belmondo

Note: ^{1} Until the 1999 World Championships and the 1994 Olympics, World Championship and Olympic races were included in the World Cup scoring system.
