= Simone Eder =

Austrian luger

Personal information
- Nationality: Austrian
- Born: 21 April 1974 (age 50); Innsbruck, Austria

Sport
- Sport: Luge

Simone Eder (born 21 April 1974) is an Austrian luger. She competed in the women's singles event at the 2002 Winter Olympics.
