= Oryslava Chukhlib =

Ukrainian luger (born 1974)

Personal information
- Nationality: Ukrainian
- Born: 2 August 1974 (age 50); Lviv, Ukraine

Sport
- Sport: Luge

Oryslava Chukhlib (born 2 August 1974) is a Ukrainian luger. She competed in the women's singles event at the 2002 Winter Olympics.
