= Mélanie Ougier =

French luger (born 1984)

Personal information
- Nationality: French
- Born: 11 May 1984 (age 40); Bourg-Saint-Maurice, France

Sport
- Sport: Luge

Mélanie Ougier (born 11 May 1984) is a French former luger. She competed in the women's singles event at the 2002 Winter Olympics.
