= Gruppo Sportivo Forestale =

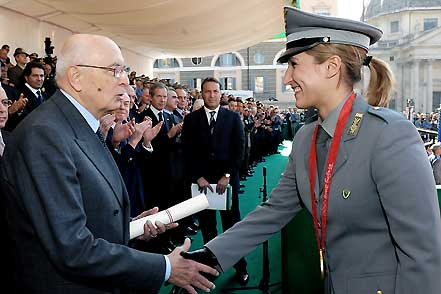
- Sport: All disciplines
- Jurisdiction: Italy
- Abbreviation: G.S. Forestale
- Founded: 1955
- Affiliation: CONI
- Headquarters: Rome
- President: Cesare Patrone
- Closure date: 2017

The Gruppo Sportivo Forestale was the former sport section of the Italian forestry, fishery and environment police force, State Forestry Corps.

== History ==
Founded in 1955, it has now been integrated since 1 January 2017 into the Sports Group of the Carabinieri (Centro Sportivo Carabinieri).

== Famous athletes ==
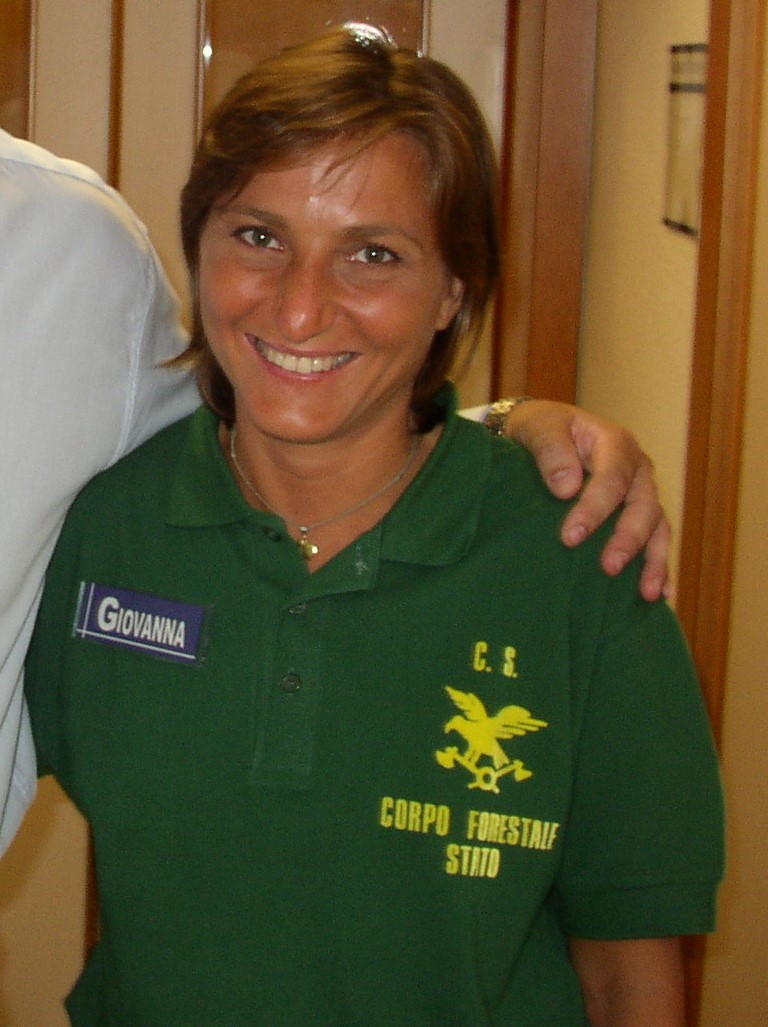
The Olympic Champion Giovanna Trillini with the Forestale green jersey.

=== Alpine skiing ===
- Deborah Compagnoni

=== Cross-country skiing ===
- Stefania Belmondo
- Antonella Confortola
- Manuela Di Centa
- Arianna Follis
- Cristina Paluselli
- Gabriella Paruzzi
- Fulvio Valbusa
- Sabina Valbusa

=== Luge ===
- Gerda Weissensteiner

=== Athletics ===
- Angelo Carosi
- Maria Guida
- Elisabetta Perrone

=== Fencing ===
- Giovanna Trillini

=== Rowing ===
- Marcello Miani

=== Shooting ===
- Chiara Cainero
- Ennio Falco
- Maura Genovesi

=== Whitewater slalom ===
- Daniele Molmenti

== Medal table ==
Many medals have been won by athletes of the Gruppo Sportivo Forestale.

Event	Gold medal	Silver medal	Bronze medal
Olympic Games	15	17	20
World Championships	123	110	129
European Championships	110	80	74

== See also ==
- State Forestry Corps
- Italian military sports bodies
