= Maria Feichter =

Italian luger

Personal information
- Nationality: Italian
- Born: 29 August 1982 (age 42); Bruneck, Italy

Sport
- Sport: Luge

Maria Feichter (born 29 August 1982) is an Italian luger. She competed in the women's singles event at the 2002 Winter Olympics.
