= Dino Gillarduzzi =

Italian speed skater (born 1975)

Personal information
- Nationality: Italian
- Born: 15 October 1975 (age 50) Cortina d'Ampezzo, Italy

Sport
- Sport: Speed skating

Dino Gillarduzzi (born 15 October 1975) is an Italian speed skater. He competed in two events at the 2002 Winter Olympics.
