= Waltraud Schiefer =

Italian luger

Personal information
- Nationality: Italian
- Born: 11 July 1979 (age 45); Merano, Italy

Sport
- Sport: Luge

Waltraud Schiefer (born 11 July 1979) is an Italian luger. She competed in the women's singles event at the 2002 Winter Olympics.
