= Patrizia Bassis =

Italian alpine skier (born 1973)

Patrizia Bassis (born 18 March 1973 in Alzano Lombardo) is an Italian retired alpine skier who competed in the 2002 Winter Olympics.
