= Karin Moroder =

Italian cross-country skier

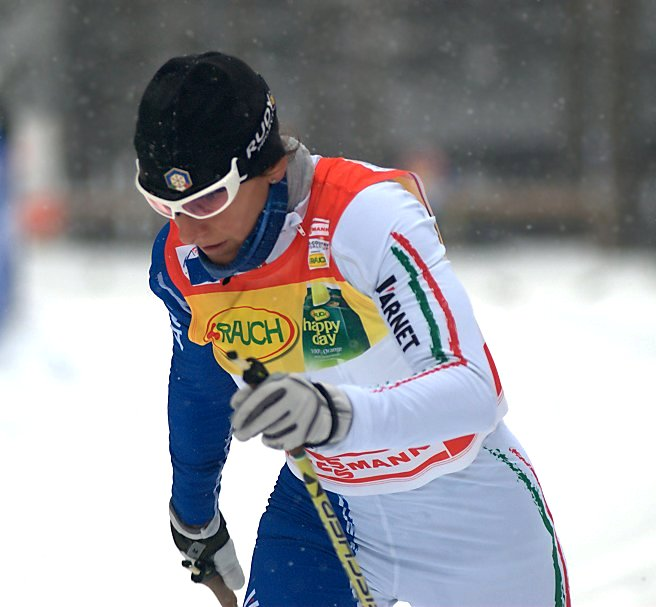

Personal information
- Nationality: Italy
- Born: 30 November 1974 (age 51) Bolzano, Italy

Sport
- Sport: Skiing
- Club: G.S. Forestale

World Cup career
- Seasons: 16 – (1995–2010)
- Indiv. starts: 169
- Indiv. podiums: 1
- Indiv. wins: 0
- Team starts: 39
- Team podiums: 2
- Team wins: 0
- Overall titles: 0 – (28th in 2001)
- Discipline titles: 0
Medal record
Women's cross-country skiing
Representing Italy
Olympic Games
| Bronze medal – third place | 1998 Nagano | 4 × 5 km relay |

Karin Moroder (born 30 November 1974) is an Italian cross-country skier who has competed since 1994. Competing in three Winter Olympics, she won a bronze medal in the 4 × 5 km relay at Nagano in 1998.

Moroder's best finish at the FIS Nordic World Ski Championships was a 24th-place finish in the individual sprint at Lahti in 2001.

Her best World Cup finish was third on three occasions, all in team sprint events from 1998 to 2003.

== Cross-country skiing results ==
All results are sourced from the International Ski Federation (FIS).

=== Olympic Games ===
- 1 medal – (1 bronze)

| Year | Age | 5 km | 10 km | 15 km | Pursuit | 30 km | Sprint | 4 × 5 km relay | Team sprint |
|---|---|---|---|---|---|---|---|---|---|
| 1998 | 23 | — | —N/a | 30 | — | DNF | —N/a | Bronze | —N/a |
| 2002 | 27 | —N/a | — | — | — | — | 26 | — | —N/a |
| 2010 | 35 | —N/a | — | —N/a | — | — | 39 | — | — |

=== World Championships ===
| Year | Age | 5 km | 10 km | 15 km | Pursuit | 30 km | Sprint | 4 × 5 km relay | Team sprint |
|---|---|---|---|---|---|---|---|---|---|
| 1999 | 24 | 51 | —N/a | — | 34 | — | —N/a | — | —N/a |
| 2001 | 26 | —N/a | — | DNF | — | CNX^{[a]} | 24 | — | —N/a |
| 2003 | 28 | —N/a | — | — | — | — | 26 | — | —N/a |
| 2007 | 32 | —N/a | — | —N/a | — | 35 | 50 | — | — |
| 2009 | 34 | —N/a | 27 | —N/a | — | — | 48 | — | — |

a. ^{1} Cancelled due to extremely cold weather.

=== World Cup ===
==== Season standings ====
| Season | Age | Discipline standings | | | | | Ski Tour standings | |
| Season | Age | Overall | Distance | Long Distance | Middle Distance | Sprint | Tour de Ski | World Cup Final |
|---|---|---|---|---|---|---|---|---|
| 1995 | 20 | NC | —N/a | —N/a | —N/a | —N/a | —N/a | —N/a |
| 1996 | 21 | NC | —N/a | —N/a | —N/a | —N/a | —N/a | —N/a |
| 1997 | 22 | NC | —N/a | NC | —N/a | — | —N/a | —N/a |
| 1998 | 23 | 32 | —N/a | NC | —N/a | 25 | —N/a | —N/a |
| 1999 | 24 | 33 | —N/a | 58 | —N/a | 14 | —N/a | —N/a |
| 2000 | 25 | 44 | —N/a | NC | NC | 29 | —N/a | —N/a |
| 2001 | 26 | 28 | —N/a | —N/a | —N/a | 8 | —N/a | —N/a |
| 2002 | 27 | 41 | —N/a | —N/a | —N/a | 19 | —N/a | —N/a |
| 2003 | 28 | 47 | —N/a | —N/a | —N/a | 30 | —N/a | —N/a |
| 2004 | 29 | 56 | NC | —N/a | —N/a | 30 | —N/a | —N/a |
| 2005 | 30 | 54 | NC | —N/a | —N/a | 28 | —N/a | —N/a |
| 2006 | 31 | 95 | NC | —N/a | —N/a | 56 | —N/a | —N/a |
| 2007 | 32 | 71 | 81 | —N/a | —N/a | 84 | 38 | —N/a |
| 2008 | 33 | 99 | NC | —N/a | —N/a | 76 | 37 | — |
| 2009 | 34 | 47 | 66 | —N/a | —N/a | 32 | 32 | — |
| 2010 | 35 | 68 | 85 | —N/a | —N/a | 37 | DNF | — |

==== Individual podiums ====
- 1 podium

| No. | Season | Date | Location | Race | Level | Place |
|---|---|---|---|---|---|---|
| 1 | 1998–99 | 28 December 1998 | Engelberg, Switzerland | 1.0 km Sprint F | World Cup | 3rd |

==== Team podiums ====
- 2 podiums – (2 TS)

| No. | Season | Date | Location | Race | Level | Place | Teammate |
|---|---|---|---|---|---|---|---|
| 1 | 2002–03 | 14 February 2003 | Asiago, Italy | 6 × 1.4 km Team Sprint F | World Cup | 3rd | Follis |
| 2 | 2003–04 | 7 December 2003 | Toblach, Italy | 6 × 1.2 km Team Sprint F | World Cup | 3rd | Kelder |
