= Christian Steger =

Italian skeleton racer

Christian Steger (born 15 August 1967 in Bruneck) is an Italian skeleton racer who competed from the late 1990s to 2002. He finished 19th in the men's skeleton event at the 2002 Winter Olympics in Salt Lake City.

Steger's best finish at the FIBT World Championships was 21st at Calgary in 2001. He retired after the 2002 games.
