= Cross-country skiing at the 2002 Winter Olympics =

Cross-country skiing at the XIX Olympic Winter Games
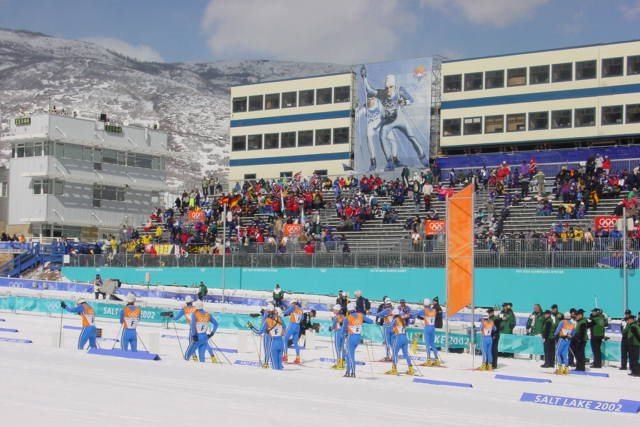
- Olympic Cross-country skiing athletes compete at Soldier Hollow.
- Venue: Soldier Hollow
- Date: February 9 – February 23
- No. of events: 12
- Competitors: 260 (153 men and 107 women) from 44 nations

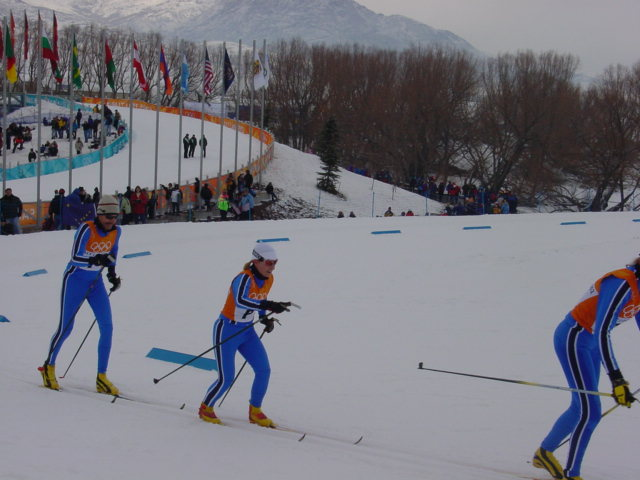
Athletes compete at Soldier Hollow on February 14, 2002.

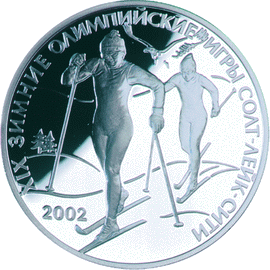
A Russian commemorative coin depicting Cross-country skiing at the 2002 Winter Olympics

The cross-country skiing events at the 2002 Winter Olympics were marred by drug problems. The winners of three races were disqualified after blood tests showed that three skiers had overly high red blood cell counts indicating the use of darbepoetin, a drug used to treat anemia. At the time, the drug was not specifically listed in the International Olympic Committee's (IOC) list of banned substances, but the Olympic rules generally prohibit doping of any kind, in accordance with its charter. After two years and several lawsuits in Olympic and Swiss courts, the skiers in question (Johann Mühlegg of Spain, and Larissa Lazutina and Olga Danilova of Russia) were stripped of all their medals from the 2002 Games.

See the external links below for the official IOC press releases containing detailed information of the doping cases and their resolution, including initial, intermediate, and final amended results. This article gives the final medalists as decided on by the IOC in early 2004.

== Medal summary ==
=== Medal table ===
Rank	Nation	Gold	Silver	Bronze	Total
1	Norway	5	2	4	11
2	Italy	2	2	2	6
3	Russia	2	1	1	4
4	Germany	1	2	2	5
5	Estonia	1	1	1	3
6	Austria	1	1	0	2
7	Canada	1	0	0	1
8	Czech Republic	0	2	0	2
9	Sweden	0	0	1	1
9	Switzerland	0	0	1	1
Totals (10 entries)		13	11	12	36

=== Men's events ===
Event	Gold		Silver		Bronze	
2 × 10 km pursuit	Frode Estil; Norway; Thomas Alsgaard; Norway	49:48.9	Not awarded		Per Elofsson; Sweden	49:52.9
15 km classical	Andrus Veerpalu; Estonia	37:07.4	Frode Estil; Norway	37:43.4	Jaak Mae; Estonia	37:50.8
30 km freestyle mass start	Christian Hoffmann; Austria	1:11:31.0	Mikhail Botvinov; Austria	1:11:32.3	Kristen Skjeldal; Norway	1:11:42.7
50 km classical	Mikhail Ivanov; Russia	2:06:20.8	Andrus Veerpalu; Estonia	2:06:44.5	Odd-Bjørn Hjelmeset; Norway	2:08:41.5
4 × 10 km relay	Norway; Anders Aukland; Frode Estil; Kristen Skjeldal; Thomas Alsgaard	1:32.45.4	Italy; Fabio Maj; Giorgio Di Centa; Pietro Piller Cottrer; Cristian Zorzi	1:32:45.8	Germany; Jens Filbrich; Andreas Schlütter; Tobias Angerer; René Sommerfeldt	1:33:34.5
Sprint	Tor Arne Hetland; Norway	2:56.9	Peter Schlickenrieder; Germany	2:57.0	Cristian Zorzi; Italy	2:57.2

=== Women's events ===
Event	Gold		Silver		Bronze	
2 × 5 km pursuit	Beckie Scott; Canada	25:09.9	Kateřina Neumannová; Czech Republic	25:10.0	Viola Bauer; Germany	25:11.1
10 km classical	Bente Skari; Norway	28:05.6	Yuliya Chepalova; Russia	28:09.9	Stefania Belmondo; Italy	28:45.8
15 km freestyle mass start	Stefania Belmondo; Italy	39:54.4	Kateřina Neumannová; Czech Republic	40:01.3	Yuliya Chepalova; Russia	40:02.7
30 km classical	Gabriella Paruzzi; Italy	1:30:57.1	Stefania Belmondo; Italy	1:31:01.6	Bente Skari; Norway	1:31:36.3
4 × 5 km relay	Germany; Manuela Henkel; Viola Bauer; Claudia Künzel; Evi Sachenbacher	49:30.6	Norway; Marit Bjørgen; Bente Skari; Hilde G. Pedersen; Anita Moen	49:31.9	Switzerland; Andrea Huber; Laurence Rochat; Brigitte Albrecht-Loretan; Natascia Leonardi Cortesi	50:03.6
Sprint	Yuliya Chepalova; Russia	3:10.6	Evi Sachenbacher; Germany	3:12.2	Anita Moen; Norway	3:12.7

=== Participating NOCs ===
Forty-four nations competed in the cross-country skiing events at Salt Lake City.

- Armenia
- Austria
- Belarus
- Brazil
- Bulgaria
- Cameroon
- Canada
- China
- Costa Rica
- Croatia
- Czech Republic
- Estonia
- Finland
- France
- Germany
- Greece
- Hungary
- Iran
- Ireland
- Italy
- Japan
- Kazakhstan
- Kenya
- Latvia
- Liechtenstein
- Lithuania
- Macedonia
- Moldova
- Mongolia
- Nepal
- Norway
- Poland
- Romania
- Russia
- Slovakia
- Slovenia
- South Korea
- Spain
- Sweden
- Switzerland
- Thailand
- Turkey
- Ukraine
- United States

== See also ==
- Cross-country skiing at the 2002 Winter Paralympics
