= Saskia Santer =

Italian biathlete (born 1977)

Personal information
- Nationality: Italian
- Born: 5 December 1977 (age 48)

Sport
- Sport: Biathlon
Medal record
Representing Italy
Women's cross-country skiing
Junior World Championships
Gold medal – first place	1997 Canmore	4 × 5 km relay

Saskia Santer (born 5 December 1977) is an Italian biathlete. She competed at the 2002 Winter Olympics and the 2006 Winter Olympics.

== Cross-country skiing results ==
All results are sourced from the International Ski Federation (FIS).

=== World Cup ===
==== Season standings ====
Season	Age				
Season	Age	Overall	Long Distance	Middle Distance	Sprint
1995	17	NC	—N/a	—N/a	—N/a
1996	18	NC	—N/a	—N/a	—N/a
1998	20	NC	NC	—N/a	—
1999	21	NC	NC	—N/a	—
2000	22	80	61	56	NC
