= Santa Caterina di Valfurva =

Ski resort in Italy

Coordinates: 46.414°N 10.492°E

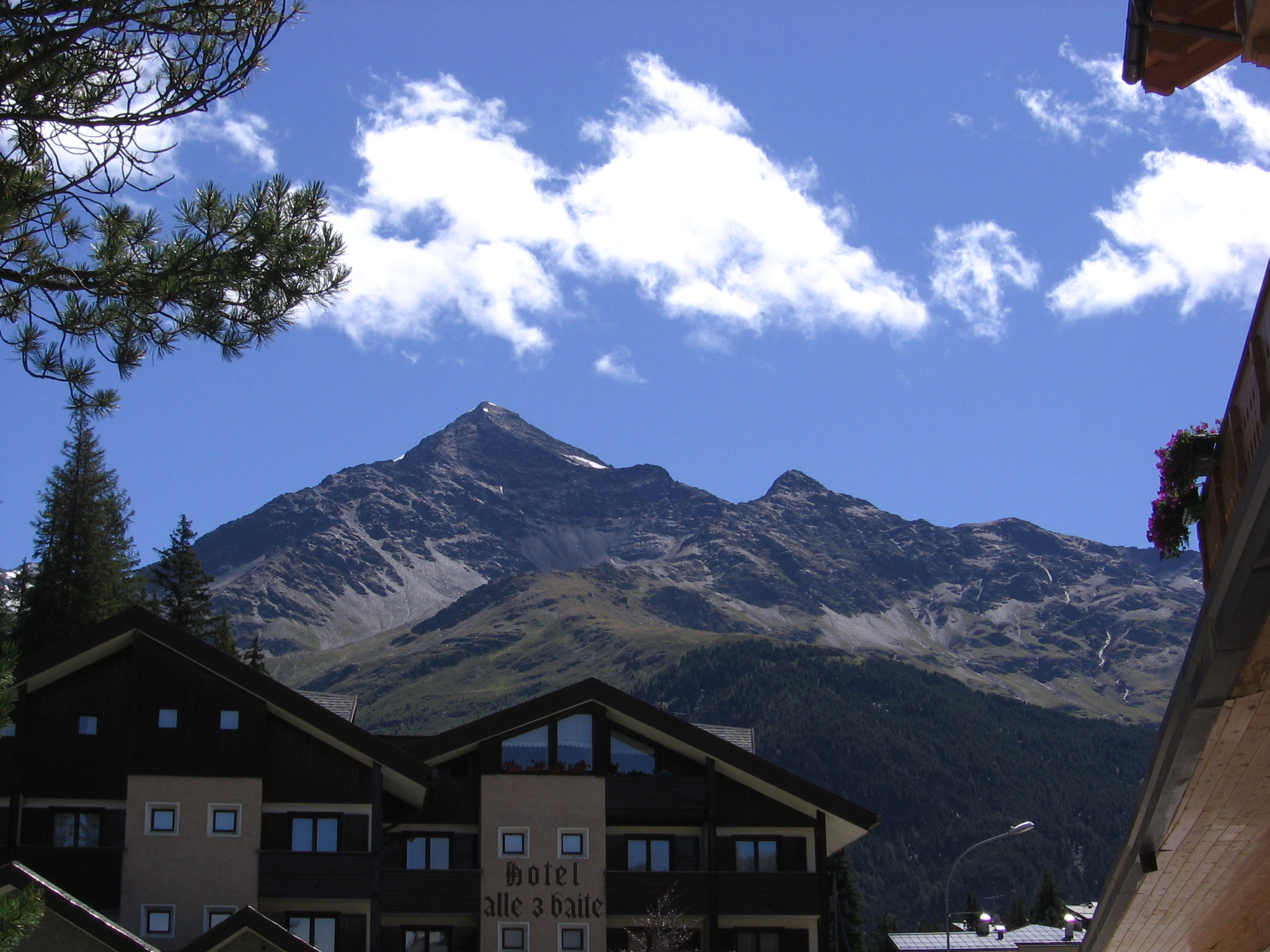
Santa Caterina di Valfurva

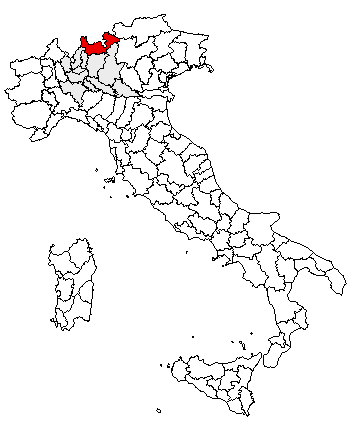
Location of the province of Sondrio

Santa Caterina di Valfurva is a frazione of the comune of Valfurva, in the northern Italian province of Sondrio. It is home to a popular ski resort, which has held numerous FIS World Cup alpine races; Santa Caterina co-hosted the World Championships with Bormio in 1985 and 2005. The highest point of the resort is on the Monte Sobretta.

== Geography ==
The village is in the Parco Nazionale di Stelvio, and is twelve kilometres (7 mi) from Bormio, 78 km (50 mi) from Sondrio, and 202 km (125 mi) from Milan. It is only accessible by road, via Bormio year round, and in the summer by the Passo Gavia, which connects to the Passo Valcamonica.

== Climate ==
Lying at the base of an alpine valley, it has a typical alpine climate. Winter temperatures can fall to −30 °C (−22 °F), while summer temperatures can rise to 27 °C (81 °F).

== Notable people ==
- Achille Compagnoni, first man to reach the summit of K2.
- Deborah Compagnoni, triple Olympic gold medalist.
