= Demino =

Demino may refer to several localities in Russia:

- Demino, Kursk Oblast
- Demino, Perm Krai
- Demino, Kichmengsko-Gorodetsky District, Vologda Oblast
- Demino, Nikolsky District, Vologda Oblast
- Demino, Sheksninsky District, Vologda Oblast
- Demino, Nesvoysky Selsoviet, Vologodsky District, Vologda Oblast
- Demino, Vysokovsky Selsoviet, Vologodsky District, Vologda Oblast

== See also ==
- Demino Ski Marathon
- Dyomino (disambiguation)
