= Dyomino =

Dyomino may refer to several places in Russia:

- Dyomino, Perm Krai
- Dyomino, Altai Krai
- Dyomino, Gus-Khrustalny District, Vladimir Oblast
- Dyomino, Kovrovsky District, Vladimir Oblast

== See also ==
- Demino (disambiguation)
