= Racing =

Speed competition

Horse racing at Arlington Park

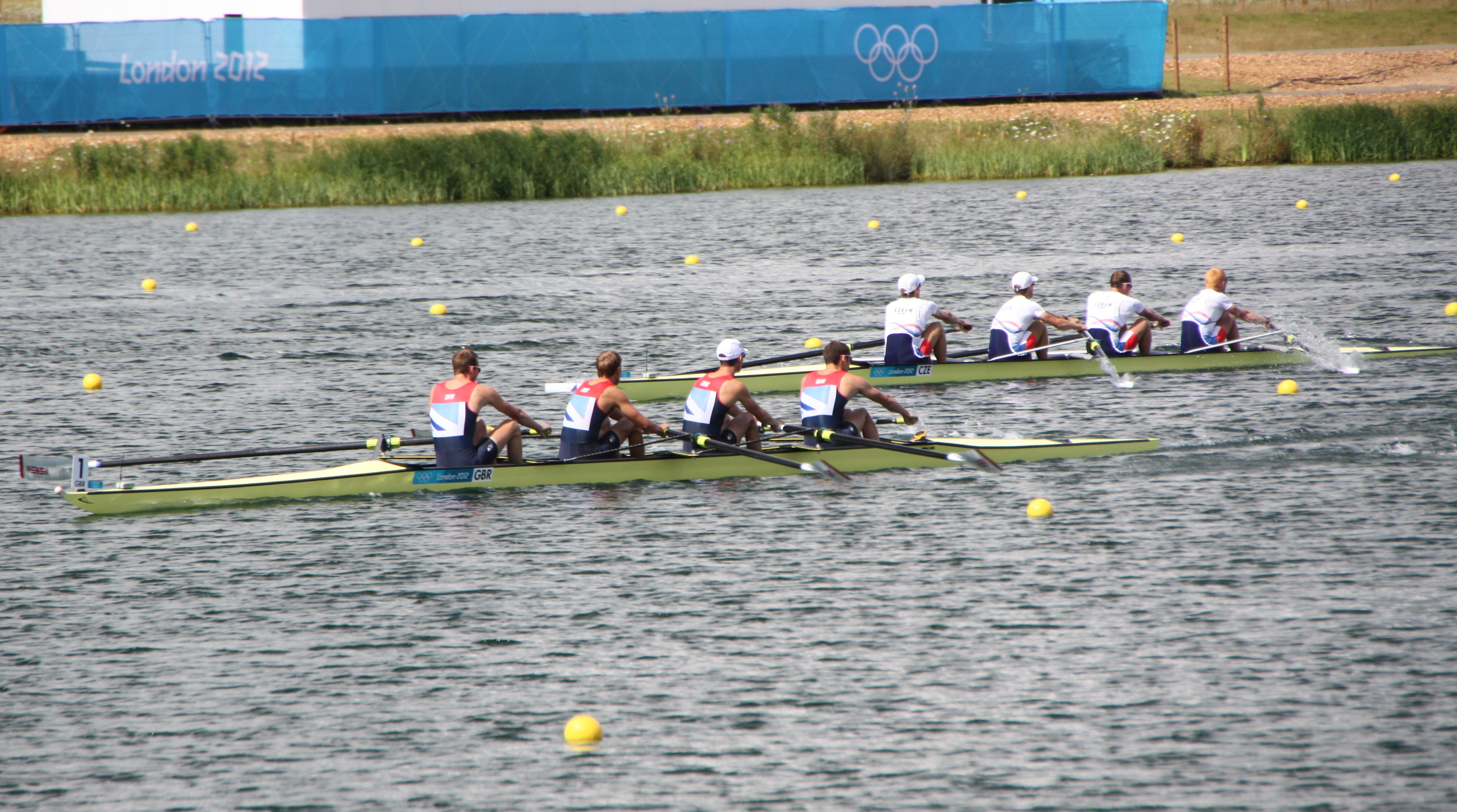
The Men's lightweight coxless four rowing race at the 2012 Summer Olympics in London

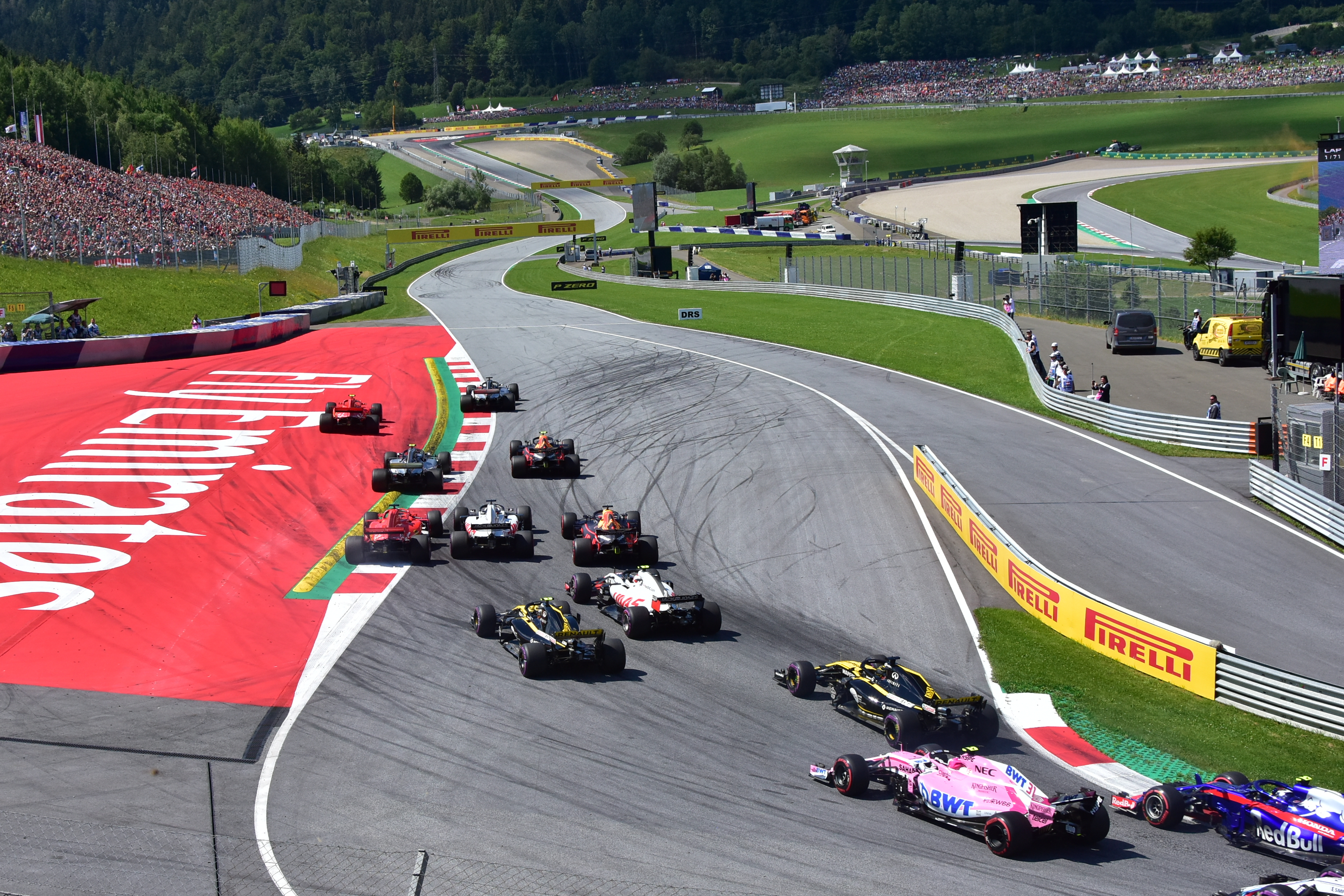
The start of the 2018 Austrian Grand Prix auto race

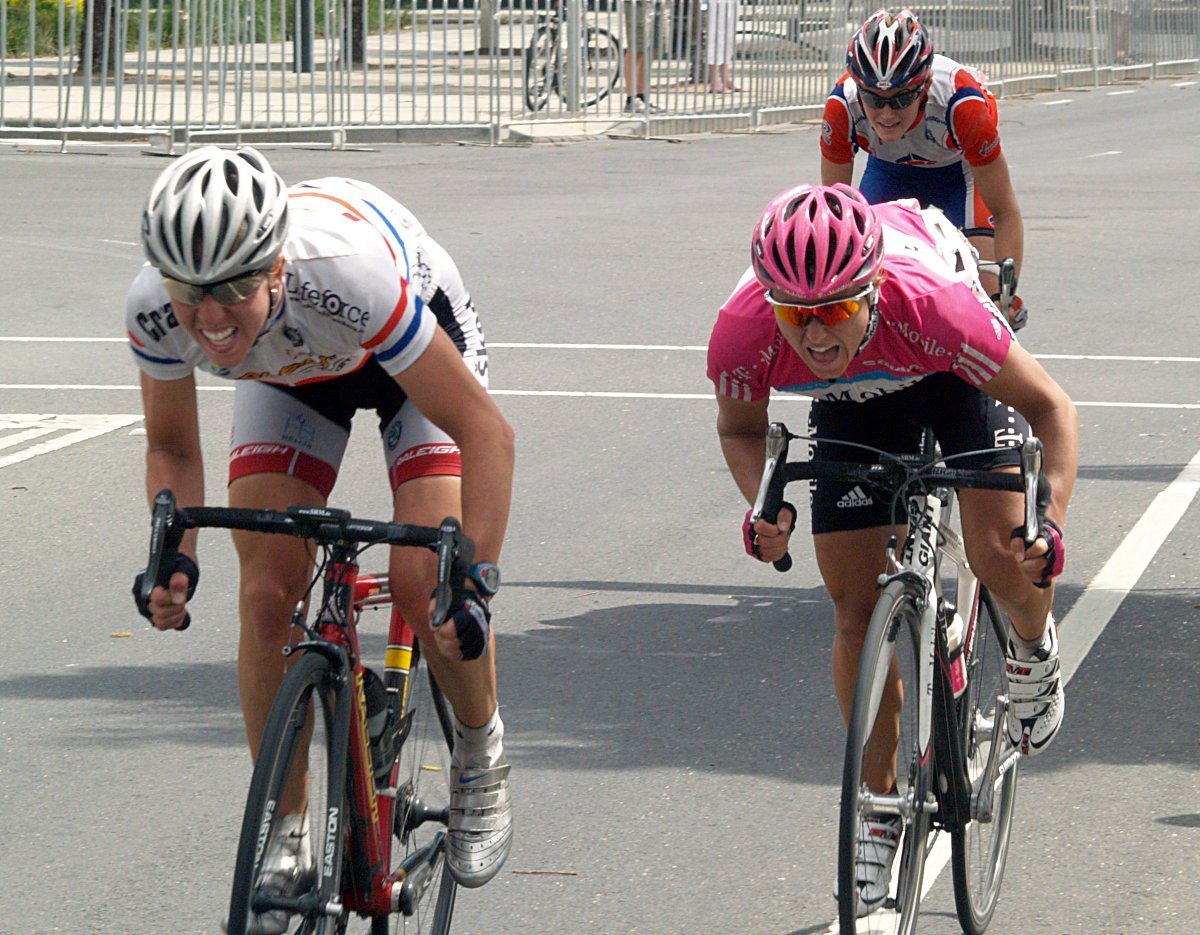
Two women in a tight sprint finish at the end of the Australia World Cup cycling race

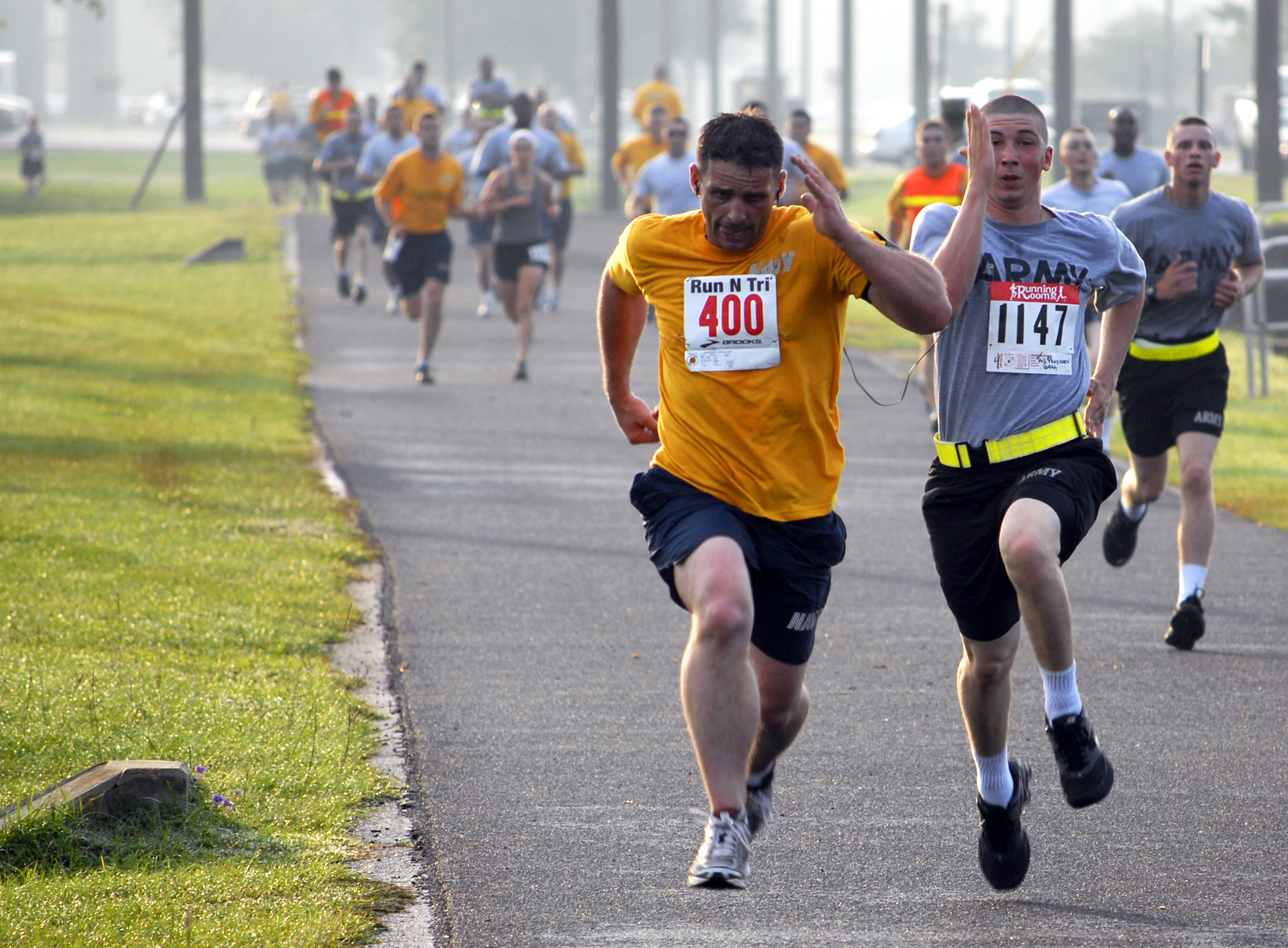
Two men engaging in a sprint finish at the end of a 5-kilometre road running competition

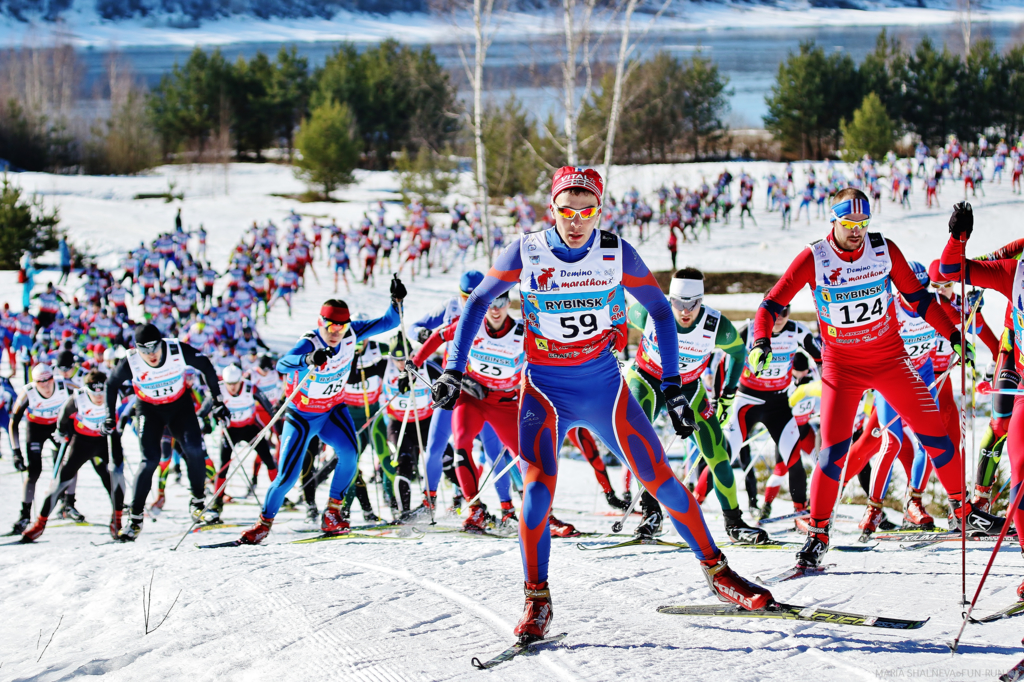
Cross-country skiers racing at the Demino Ski Marathon, March 2015

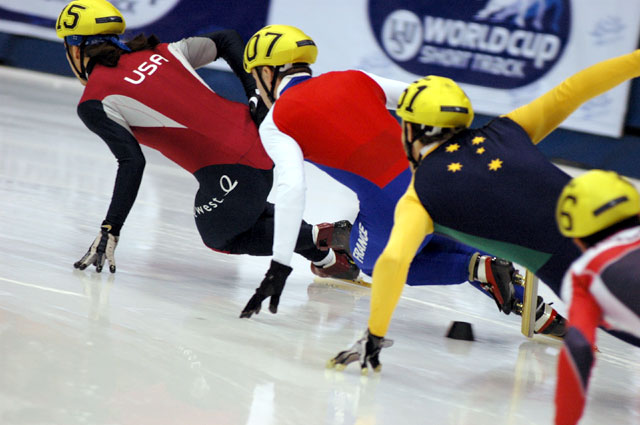
Short-track speed skaters racing through a curve

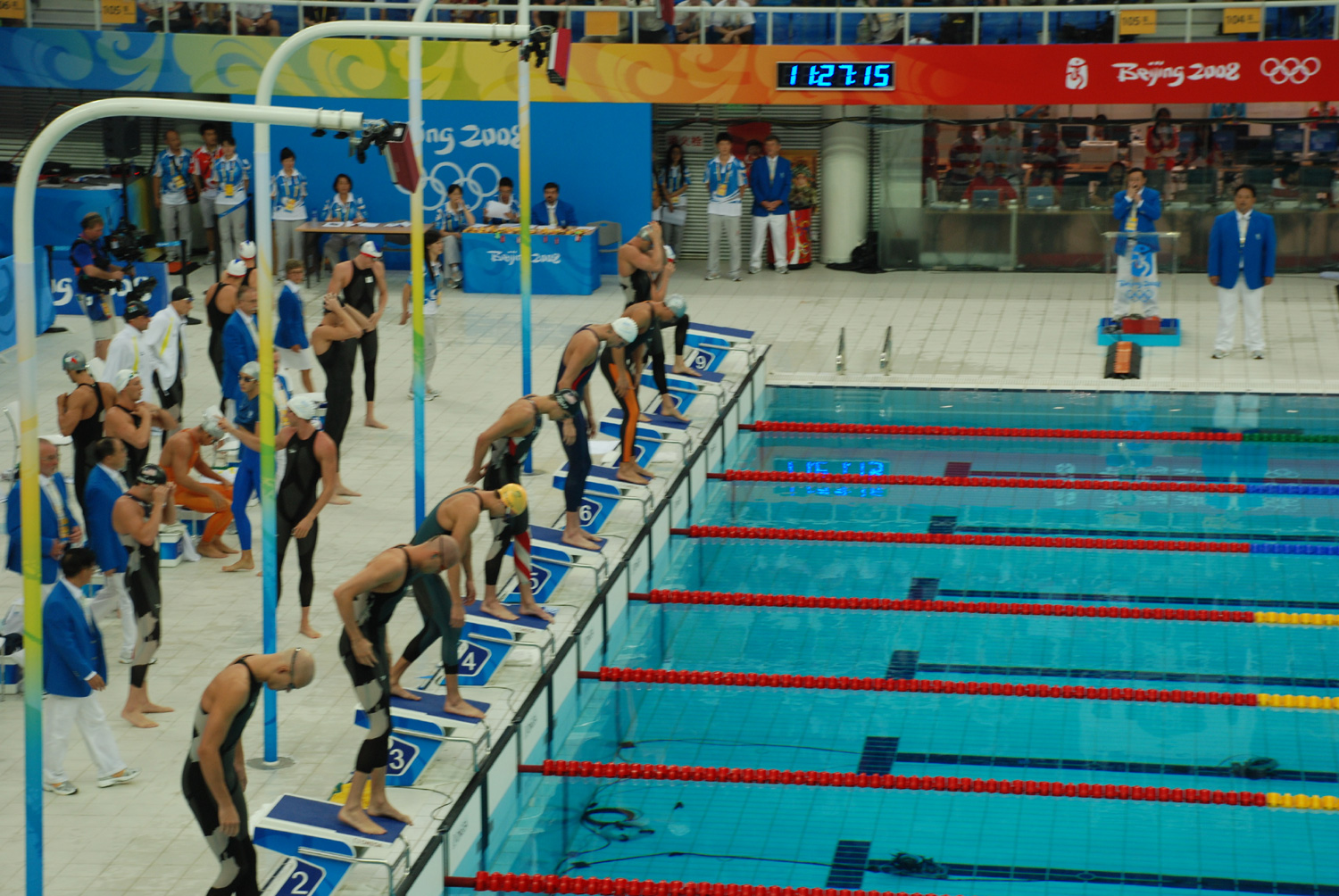
Start of the 4 × 100 meters relay swimming race during the 2008 Summer Olympics in Beijing

In sports, racing is a competition of speed, in which competitors try to complete a given task in the shortest amount of time. Typically this involves traversing some distance, but it can be any other task involving speed to reach a specific goal.

A race may be run continuously to finish or may be made up of several segments called heats, stages or legs. A heat is usually run over the same course at different times. A stage is a shorter section of a much longer course or a time trial.

Early records of races are evident on pottery from ancient Greece, which depicted running men vying for first place. A chariot race is described in Homer's Iliad.

== Etymology ==
The word race comes from a Norse word. This Norse word arrived in France during the invading of Normandy and gave the word raz which means "swift water" in Brittany, as in a mill race; it can be found in "Pointe du Raz" (the most western point of France, in Brittany), and "raz-de-marée" (tsunami). The word race to mean a "contest of speed" was first recorded in the 1510s.

A race and its name are often associated with the place of origin, the means of transport and the distance of the race. As a couple of examples, see the Dakar Rally or the Athens Marathon.

== Forms ==
Running a distance is the most basic form of racing, but races may also be done by climbing, swimming, walking, or other types of human locomotion. Races may be conducted with animals such as camels, dogs, horses, pigeons, pigs, snails, or turtles. They also may be done in vehicles such as aircraft, bicycles, boats, cars, or motorcycles; or with another means of transport such as skates, skateboards, skis, sleds, snowboards, or wheelchair. In a relay race members of a team take turns in racing parts of a circuit or performing a certain racing form.

Orienteering races add an additional task of using a map and compass to navigate from point to point in diverse and usually unfamiliar terrain.

A race can also involve any other type of goal like eating. A common speed eating challenge is a hot dog eating race, where contestants try to eat more hot dogs than the other racers.

Racing board games and racing video games are also competitions of speed.

Racing can also be done in more humorous and entertaining ways such as the Sausage Race, the Red Bull Trolley Grand Prix and wok racing.

== Sprint finishes ==
A sprint finish is a racing tactic used in many forms of racing where a competitor accelerates towards top speed in the final stages of a race. This tactic is mostly associated with long-distance forms of running and cycling, which often feature large groups of competitors racing at a slower pace for much of the race – this slower aerobic racing allows for the subsequent anaerobic activity required for sprinting. The tactic relies upon keeping greater energy reserves than your opponent until the last part of the race in order to be able to reach the finish point first. It is the opposing tactic to keeping a steady optimal pace throughout a race to maximise your energy efficiency (see running economy).

In track and field, distances from 1500 metres upwards often feature sprint finishes. They can also be found in cross country and road running events, even up to the marathon distance. A runner's ability to sprint at the end of a race is also known as their finishing kick. Multisport races, such as the triathlon, often have running as the final section and sprint finish tactics are applied as they are in running-only events.

In cycling, sprint finishes are an integral part of the sport and are used in both track cycling and road cycling. Cycling sprints are often highly tactical, particularly on the track, with cyclists occasionally coming to a near halt at points before reaching a high speed finish. The longer track races such as scratch races often feature sprint finishes, as maintaining a steady pace within the peloton allows opponents to conserve energy through drafting. Road races are similar in this respect, in both short criterium races and long-distance races. Sprint tactics also form a major part of points classifications in road events, where cycling sprinters specialise in reaching an intermediate point first, thus gaining extra points and resulting prizes.

Sprint finish tactics are also used in speedskating, cross-country skiing, long-distance swimming, horse racing and other animal racing sports. The finishes of races which are outright sprinting events in themselves, such as the 100 metres track race, are not normally referred to as sprint finishes, as all competitors are already sprinting by default (thus it is not a racing tactic).

== See also ==
- List of films about bicycles and cycling
- List of films about horse racing
- Sport
- Gambling
- Totalisator
- Pacemaker
- Nuclear arms race
- Space Race
