= Worldloppet Ski Federation =

Cross-country skiing association

- Formation: 10 June 1978
- Founded at: Uppsala, Sweden
- Type: sports governing body
- Headquarters: Tartu
- Location: Estonia
- Official language: English, Swedish
- Website: https://www.worldloppet.com/

The Worldloppet Ski Federation is an international federation of long distance cross-country skiing events whose aim is to promote cross-country skiing through ski races. The federation was founded on 10 June 1978 in Uppsala, Sweden.

== Locations ==
Membership in Wordloppet is limited to one race per country, with an emphasis being placed on prestige. As of 2015, there are 20 official Worldloppet races. While primarily concentrated in Europe, there also races in North America, Asia, and Australasia.

Event	Distance Classic Style	Distance Free Style	Location
(Australia) Kangaroo Hoppet		42 / 21 km	Falls Creek, Victoria, Australia
(Czech Republic) Jizerská Padesátka 50	50 / 25 km	30 km	Bedřichov, Czech Republic
(Austria) Dolomitenlauf	42 / 21 km	60 km	Obertilliach / Lienz, Austria
(Italy) Marcialonga	70 / 45 km		Moena – Cavalese, Italy
(Germany) König Ludwig Lauf	50 / 23 km	50 / 23 km	Oberammergau, Germany
(France) Transjurassienne	50 / 25 km	76 / 54 km	Les Rousses / Lamoura – Mouthe, France
(Japan) Sapporo International Ski Marathon		50 / 25 km	Sapporo, Japan
(Estonia) Tartu Maraton	63 / 31 km		Otepää – Elva, Estonia
(Canada) Gatineau Loppet	53 / 29 km	53 / 29 km	Gatineau, Quebec, Canada
(United States) American Birkebeiner	53 / 29 km	50 / 29 km	Cable – Hayward, Wisconsin, United States
(Finland) Finlandia-hiihto	62 / 32 km	50 km	Lahti, Finland
(Sweden) Vasaloppet	90 / 45 / 30 km		Sälen – Mora, Sweden
(Switzerland) Engadin Skimarathon		42 / 21 / 17 km	Maloja – S-chanf, Switzerland
(Norway) Birkebeinerrennet	54 km		Rena – Lillehammer, Norway
(Russia) Demino Ski Marathon	25 km	50 km	Rybinsk, Russia
(Poland) Bieg Piastów	50 / 26 km	30 km	Szklarska Poręba, Poland
(Iceland) Fossavatnsgangan	50 / 25 km	25 km	Ísafjörður, Iceland
Vasaloppet China	50 km		Changchun, China
(New Zealand) Merino Muster		42 / 21 km	Wānaka, New Zealand
(Argentina) Ushuaia Loppet		42 km	Ushuaia, Argentina

== Racing distances ==
Actual racing distances may vary from year to year according to the local snow conditions, but usually, there are different categories: full distance (at least 42 km, the length of a non-skiing marathon (26 miles)) and shorter ones for children and less experienced skiers. For Vasaloppet, the oldest of the races, the full distance is about 90 km (56 mi). Some races are freestyle (both skating and classic are allowed), but others only permit classic style.

== Worldloppet Master ==
Those who complete Worldloppet races in 10 countries, at least one of which is from a continent other than Europe, qualify as a Worldloppet Master. They qualify for Worldloppet Gold Master if they have completed 10 main races, or a Silver Master if they have competed 10 races where some or all of them are short races. As of October 2019, more than 5,000 master titles have been issued.
