= Sapporo International Ski Marathon =

Cross-country skiing marathon in Japan

- Status: active
- Genre: sporting event
- Date: February
- Frequency: annual
- Location: Sapporo
- Country: Japan
- Inaugurated: 1981

The Sapporo International Ski Marathon is a cross-country skiing marathon in Japan. It has been held since 1981 and is part of Worldloppet since 1985.
