= Vasaloppet China =

Annual cross-country skiing competition in China

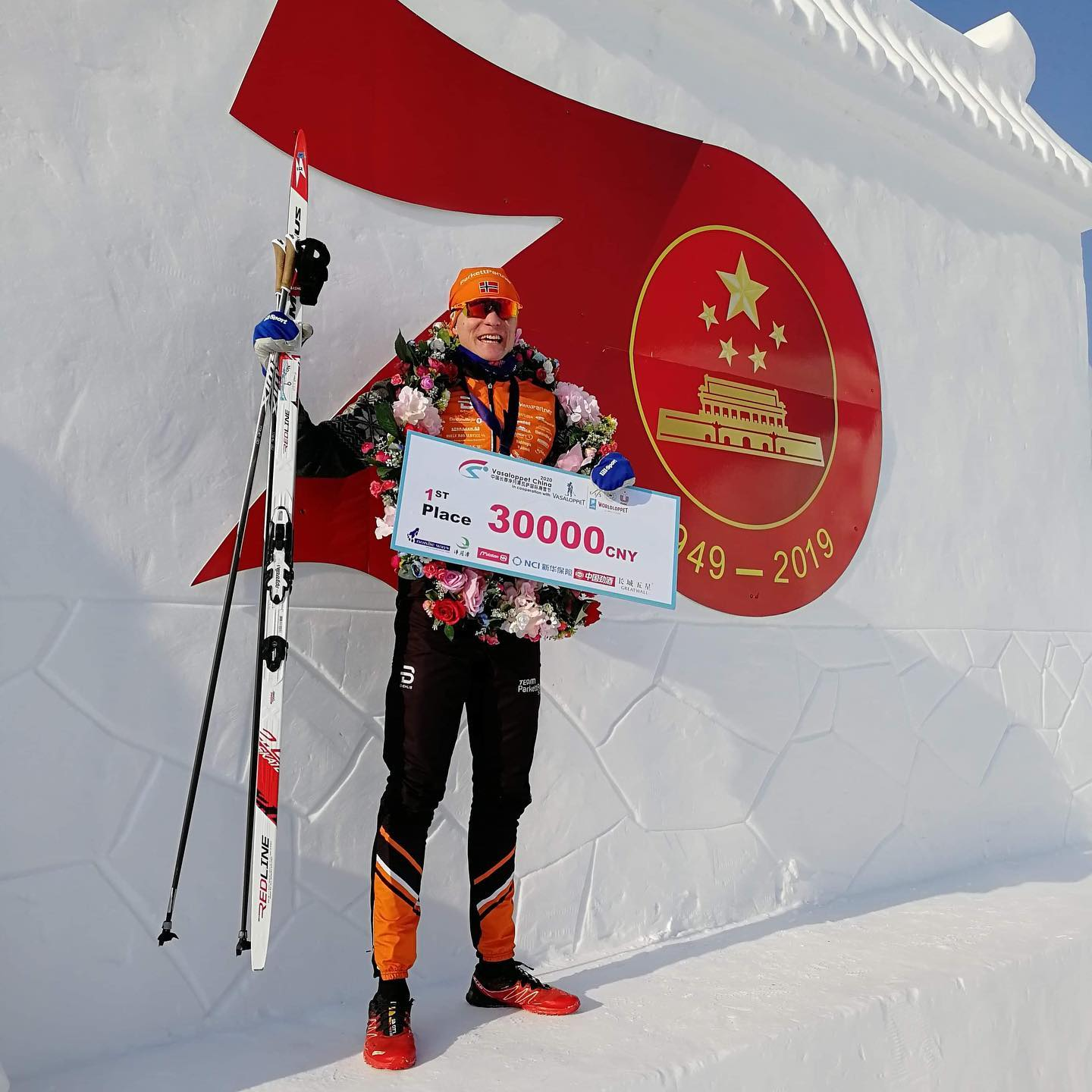
- Vinjar Skogsholm of Norway celebrates his victory in the 2020 men's edition
- Status: active
- Genre: sporting event
- Date: January
- Frequency: annual
- Country: People's Republic of China
- Inaugurated: 2003
- Website: www.vasaloppetchina.com

Vasaloppet China (Swedish: Kinavasan) is a cross-country skiing competition held in the beginning of every year in Changchun, China. Originally held in 2003, it has been a part of Worldloppet since 2014. The competition is named after Vasaloppet in Sweden. The event takes place in Jingyuetan National Forest Park.

== Background ==
The initiative to the race was taken by Swedish orienteer Jörgen Mårtensson during his travels in China at the time of the turn of the millennium.
