= Bieg Piastów =

Annual cross-country skiing competition in Poland

- Status: active
- Genre: sporting event
- Date: February–March
- Frequency: annual
- Location: Szklarska Poręba
- Country: Poland
- Inaugurated: 1976

The Bieg Piastów (literally the Piast Race) is a cross-country skiing marathon in Poland. It has been held since 1976. and is part of Worldloppet since 2008.
