= Tartu Maraton =

Annual cross-country skiing competition in Estonia

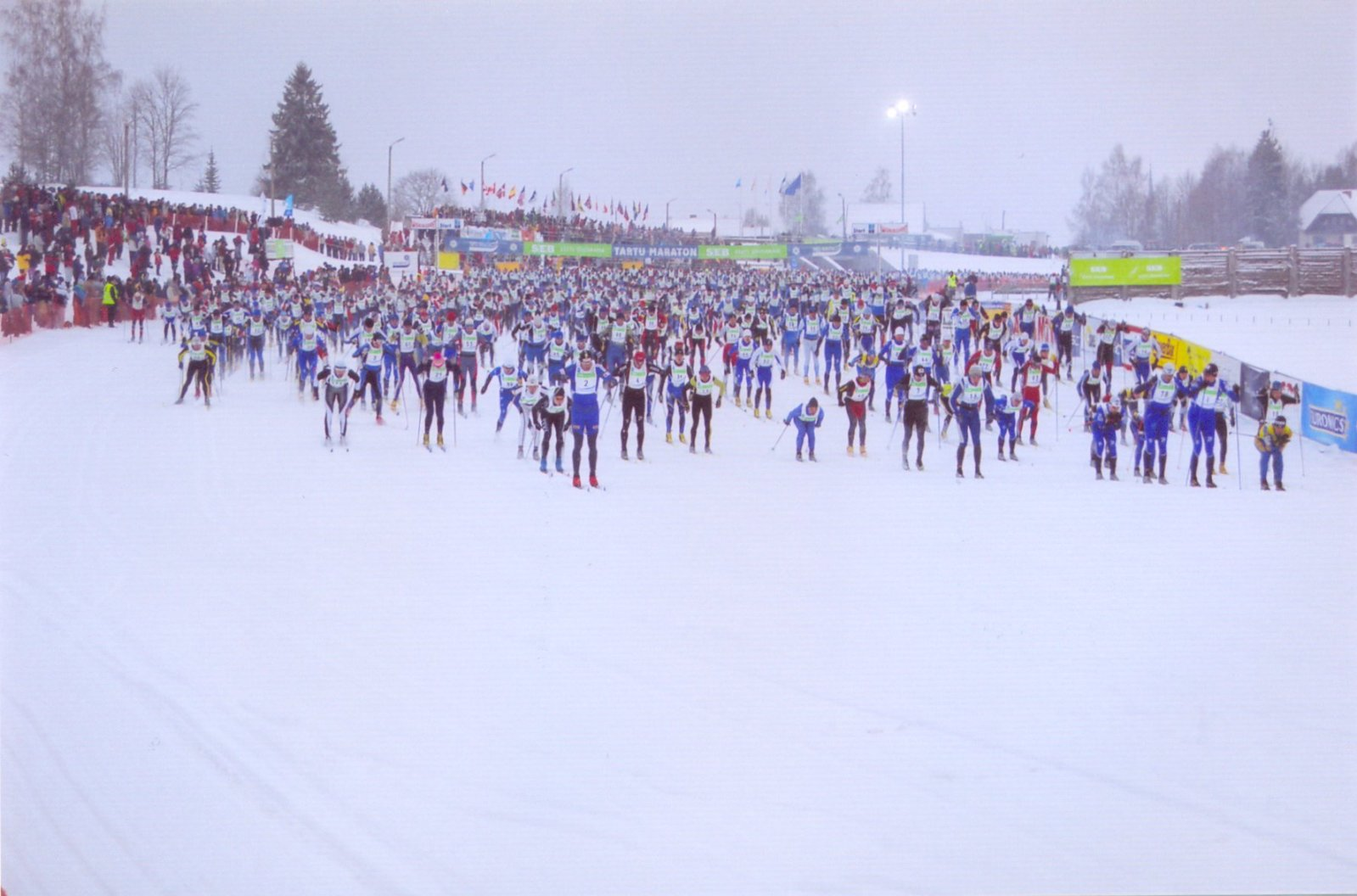
- The start of Tartu Marathon in 2006.
- Status: active
- Genre: sporting event
- Date: February
- Frequency: annual
- Country: Estonia
- Inaugurated: 1960 (men); 1967 (women)

The Tartu Ski Marathon (Estonian: Tartu maraton) is a long-distance cross-country skiing competition, held annually in Estonia, on the third Sunday of February. It debuted in 1960 and has been a part of Worldloppet since 1994.

Initially, the track stretched from Tartu to Kääriku, partially on the Emajõgi river ice. For years the marathon's start was given in Matu (in Aakre) with the finish in Elva. Nowadays, the full 63 km marathon track stretches from Otepää to Elva.

The event is part of the Worldloppet events, and places itself among the biggest ski races in the world with nearly 12,000 participants in its peak years.
