= Jingyuetan National Forest Park =

Tourist attraction in Jilin, China

Coordinates: 43°46′58″N 125°27′30″E

Jingyuetan National Forest Park is a forest park and tourist attraction in Changchun, Jilin. 18km southeast of the city, the park covers over 100 square kilometers. The park was created in 1934, approved as a forest park in 1989 and the lake was listed as a key national scenic area in 1998. According to the government of Changchun, the park is the largest man-made forest in Asia. The man-made forest had an area of 1,000 hectares in the 1930s, but by 2015 the area was around 10,000 hectares.

The forest park is one of the AAAAA Tourist Attractions of China. There are more than 100 high points within the park.

== Jingyuetan Lake ==
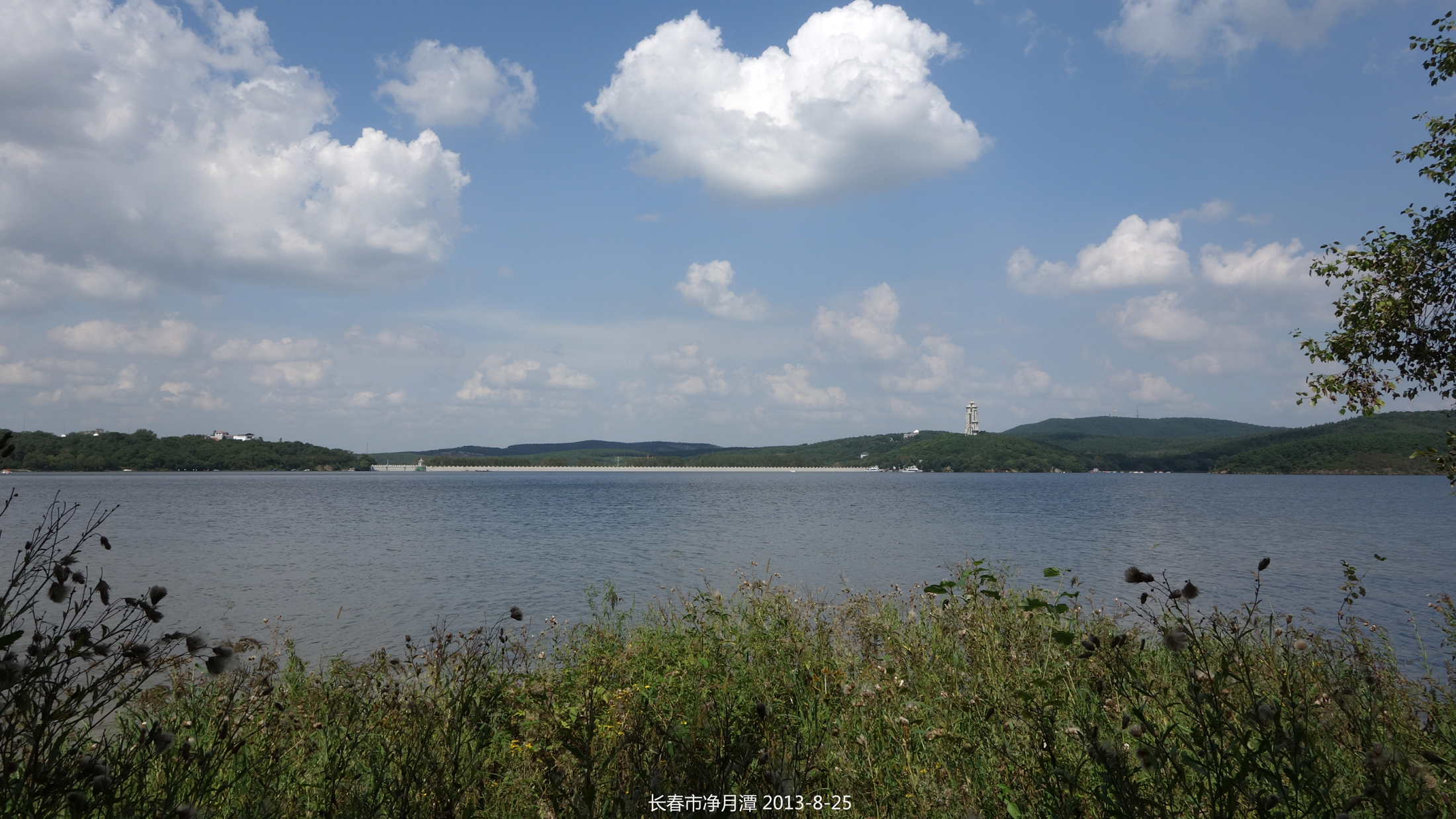
Jingyuetan Lake

The forest park is named for the lake in the center of the park, translated as "Clean Moon Lake". The lake was named for its shape, and has a surface area of 4.3 square kilometers.

== Changchun Vasaloppet International Skiing Festival ==
The park has hosted the Changchun Vasaloppet International Skiing Festival and Vasaloppet China annually since 2003.
