= Dolomitenlauf =

- Status: active
- Genre: sporting event
- Date: January
- Frequency: annual
- Location: East Tyrol
- Country: Austria
- Inaugurated: 1970

The Dolomitenlauf is a cross-country skiing marathon in Austria. It has been held since 1970 and has been part of Worldloppet as long as Worldloppet has been around.
