= Merino Muster =

New Zealand cross-country skiing marathon

- Status: active
- Genre: sporting event
- Date: August
- Frequency: annual
- Location: Wānaka
- Country: New Zealand
- Inaugurated: 1995

The Merino Muster is a cross-country ski race held annually at the Snow Farm in Wānaka, New Zealand. The event offers four different length races of 42 km, 21 km, 14 km, and 7 km. The race was founded in 1995, and it has been a member of the Worldloppet Ski Federation since 2014.

== History ==
The Merino Muster was predated by two races held in the area. The first was held in the 1980's at the Cardrona Ski Area, and the second was held in 1990 at the site of the future Merino Muster. In 1995, the first official Merino Muster Race was held at the Snow Farm in Wānaka, New Zealand. The race was originally sponsored by the CSL Ltd Animal Health Division. CSL manager John Burridge helped create the race to support farmers and veterinarians. In 2014, the 42 km race became an official member of the Worldloppet Ski Federation. The highest number of participants in the race occurred in 2015, with 112 people completing the 42 km race.

=== Name ===
The name "Merino Muster" originated from the regional tradition of mustering Merino sheep. Mustering is the process of guiding merino sheep from the high country to the lower pastures as winter approaches (March–May). This tradition has been carried out for over 150 years in New Zealand, and is the namesake for the ski race.

== Course ==
The even consists of four races, each one differing in length: 42 km, 21 km, 14 km, and 7 km.

The 7 km race is called the "Straggle Muster." Participants of this race typically include novice skiers and families. Average times to complete this race range from 30–60 minutes.

The 14 km race is called the "Double Fleece." This race is held within the main bowl of the Snow Farm. To achieve the 14 km, participants ski two laps around the 7 km bowl.

The 21 km race is known as the "Snow Rake." Time to complete this race ranges from 1–3 hours. The course consists of two laps, the first being the same as the Double Fleece, and a second that traverses through the Meg River Valley and passes by the Meadow Hut, an aid station.

The 42 km race is called the "Merino Muster." This race is an official WorldLopped Series event. The course entails completing three laps: the first being that of the Double Fleece, the second being the Snow Rake, and the third being a final lap above the Meg river, back near the Meadow Hut, and finally to the Finish Stadium. Over the course of the race, skiers gain a total elecation of 361 m. The course descends for 38% of the race, ascends for 38% and is flat for 24%.

At the conclusion of all races, skiers receive a medal with a "jewel" in the color that corresponds to their race distance.

== Previous winners of the 42km race ==
Men	Winner	Time
2018	Simeon Hamilton	
2019	Tomoki Sato	1:47:16
2020 (distance shortened to 28 km)	Campbell Wright	
2021 (cancelled due to Covid-19 restrictions)		
2022	Campbell Wright	1:59:25
2023	Fabian Stocek	1:17:25
2024	Akito Watabe	1:51:29
2025 (shortened to 22.4 km due to snow)	Campbell Wright	0:51:44

Women	Winner	Time
2018	Jessie Diggins	
2019	Jessie Diggins	1:50:23
2020 (distance shortened to 28 km)	Rachel Knott	
2021 (cancelled due to Covid-19 restrictions)		
2022	Nicole David	2:41:11
2023	Jessie Diggins	1:18:11
2024	Jessie Diggins	1:52:49
2025 (shortened to 22.4 km due to snow)	Julia Kern	0:57:19

== Notable participants ==
Helen Clark

Jessie Diggins

Campbell Wright
