= Gatineau Loppet =

- Status: active
- Genre: sporting event
- Date: February
- Frequency: annual
- Location: Quebec
- Country: Canada
- Inaugurated: 1979
- Participants: 2,500
- Area: Gatineau Park
- Major events: cross-country ski, snowshoe, fatbike
- Website: https://www.gatineauloppet.com/?lang=en

The Gatineau Loppet, earlier known as Rivière Rouge, Gatineau 55 and Keskinada Loppet, is an international cross-country ski competition where close to 2,500 skiers of all ages and levels come together on the trails of Gatineau Park, in Gatineau, Quebec, Canada. A member of the Worldloppet league, it is part of a circuit of the 20 biggest cross-country ski races around the world, including the Vasaloppet in Sweden, and La Tranjurassienne in France. The Gatineau Loppet takes place over a weekend in February, with 8 cross-country ski races, 3 snowshoe races and 3 fat bike races. It has been held since 1979, and has been part of Worldloppet since then.
