= Demino, Nesvoysky Selsoviet, Vologodsky District, Vologda Oblast =

Demino Демино
- Village
- Location within Vologda Oblast Location within Russia
- Coordinates: 59°22′N 39°31′E
- Country: Russia
- Region: Vologda Oblast
- District: Vologodsky District
- Time zone: UTC+3:00

Demino (Russian: Демино) is a rural locality (a village) in Kubenskoye Rural Settlement, Vologodsky District, Vologda Oblast, Russia. The population was 11 as of 2002.

== Geography ==
The distance to Vologda is 41 km, to Kubenskoye is 11 km. Nesvoyskoye, GES, Pogost Rozhdestvo, Pautovo, Putyatino, Tatarovo, Pavlovo, Ostakhovo are the nearest rural localities.
