= Ushuaia Loppet =

Ski marathon in Argentina

- Status: active
- Genre: sporting event
- Date: August
- Frequency: annual
- Location: Ushuaia
- Country: Argentina
- Inaugurated: 1986

The Ushuaia Loppet is a cross-country skiing marathon in Argentina. It has been held since 1986.

== See also ==
- Marchablanca
