= Finlandia-hiihto =

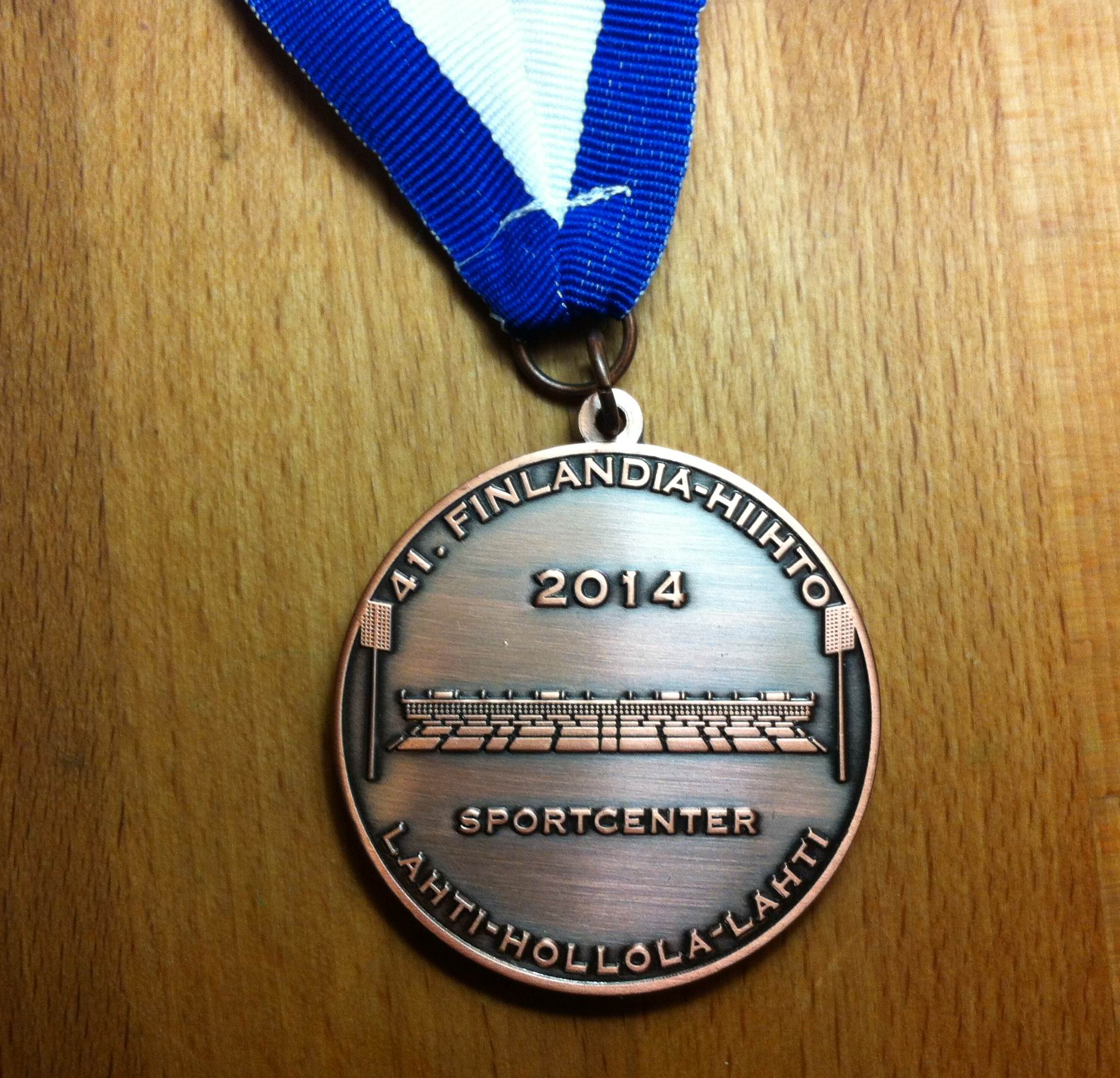
- Finlandia Hiihto Medal 2014
- Status: active
- Genre: sporting event
- Date: February
- Frequency: annual
- Country: Finland
- Inaugurated: 1974

Finlandia-hiihto (Swedish: Finlandialoppet, English: Finlandia Ski Marathon) is a long-distance cross-country skiing competition, held in Finland each February. Initially, the track stretched from Hämeenlinna to Lahti via Lammi. Since the original course went across several lakes and the ice quality varied from winter to winter, the race was later moved to a location near Lahti.

The first ever Finlandia-hiihto was to have taken place on a course leading from Hämeenlinna to Hyvinkää. However, due to a lack of snow, the race had to be cancelled. The debut event took place the following year, 1974, with a 75-kilometre course from Hämeenlinna to Lahti. In 1976, the race already attracted 3,500 participants from 14 countries. Finlandia-hiihto has been a part of the Worldloppet series since it was founded for the 1978-1979 season.

In 1982, Prince Tomohito of Mikasa from Japan took part in Finlandia-hiihto. That year also saw the number of participants exceed 10,000 for the first time. Two years later, with more than 13,000 participants, Finlandia-hiihto broke the Guinness World Record for the biggest mass skiing event in the world. In 1986, the use of the skating technique was allowed for the first time, but the ban was reintroduced in 1988. In 1990, a separate freestyle race was held on the day before the classic technique competition. The separate freestyle race was soon discontinued, but re-established in 2007.

Due to poor snow conditions in the 1990s, the event had to be moved five times from Hämeenlinna to Lahti. Consequently, a decision was made to change the location permanently, and from 2001 onwards the Finlandia-hiihto has been raced on a course that takes the competitors from Lahti to Hollola and back.

In 2011 Finlandia-hiihto became a part of the FIS Marathon Cup series, which boosted the prestige and visibility of the event.

Over 7,000 skiers took part in the 40th anniversary event of Finlandia-hiihto in 2013. In the same year, the Finlandia Ski Team was founded. The team takes part in cross-country ski races and mass skiing events in Finland and other countries.

The 2020 race had to be cancelled, for the 1st time in the event's history, due to lack of snow on account of the exceptionally mild winter in Finland.
