= Demino, Kichmengsko-Gorodetsky District, Vologda Oblast =

Demino Демино
- Village
- Location within Vologda Oblast Location within Russia
- Coordinates: 59°46′N 45°29′E
- Country: Russia
- Region: Vologda Oblast
- District: Kichmengsko-Gorodetsky District
- Time zone: UTC+3:00

Demino (Russian: Демино) is a rural locality (a village) in Kichmengskoye Rural Settlement, Kichmengsko-Gorodetsky District, Vologda Oblast, Russia. The population was 31 as of 2002.

== Geography ==
Demino is located 34 km southwest of Kichmengsky Gorodok (the district's administrative centre) by road. Plostiyevo is the nearest rural locality.
