= Dyomino, Altai Krai =

Dyomino Дёмино
- Selo
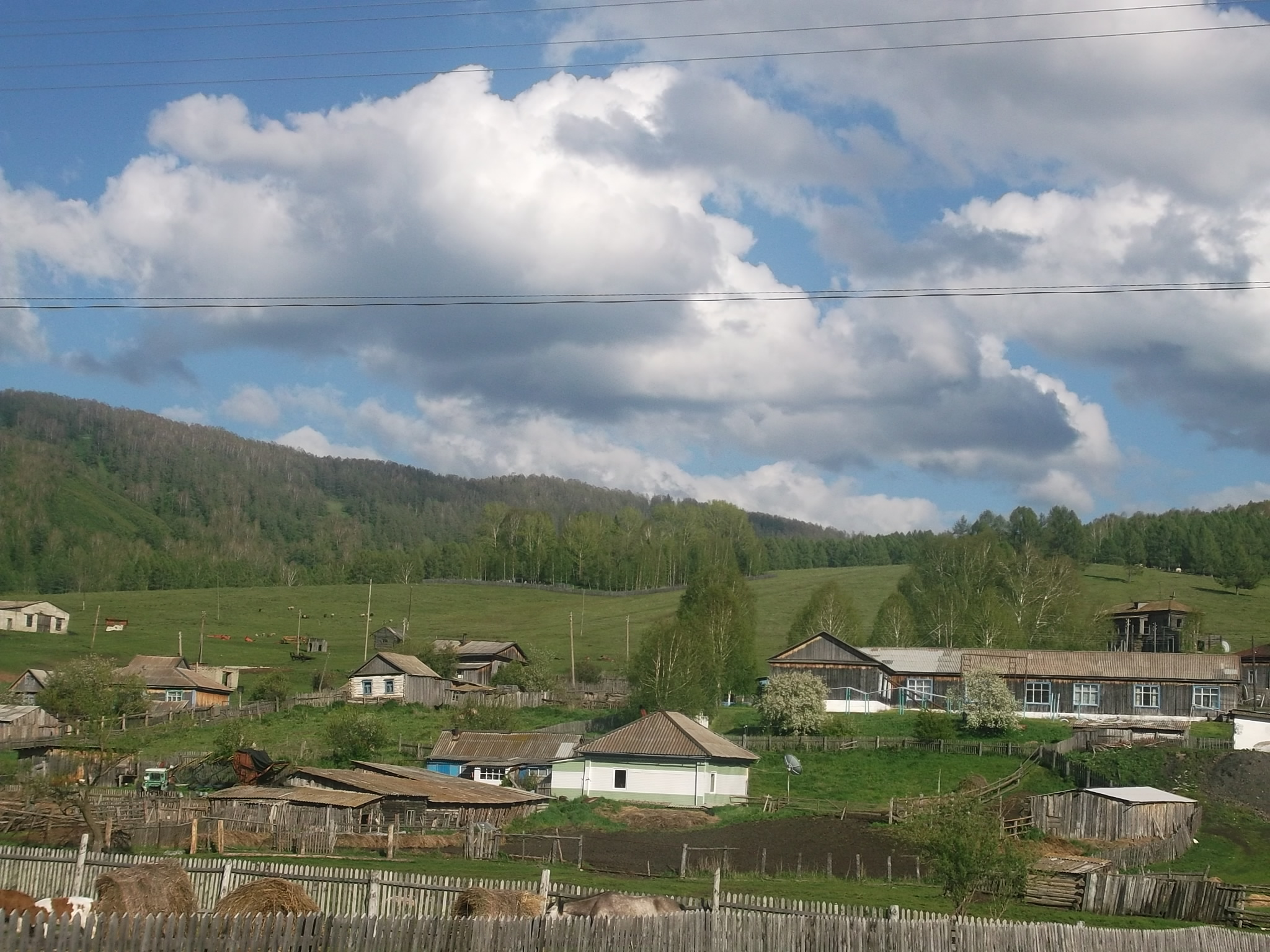

- Location within Altai Krai Location within Russia
- Coordinates: 51°33′N 84°44′E
- Country: Russia
- Region: Altai Krai
- District: Soloneshensky District
- Time zone: UTC+7:00

Dyomino (Russian: Дёмино) is a rural locality (a selo) Stepnoy Selsoviet, Soloneshensky District, Altai Krai, Russia. The population was 210 as of 2013. There are 3 streets.

== Geography ==
Dyomino is located 49 km southeast of Soloneshnoye (the district's administrative centre) by road.
