= Demino, Perm Krai =

Demino Демино
- Village
- Location within Perm Krai Location within Russia
- Coordinates: 58°49′N 54°13′E
- Country: Russia
- Region: Perm Krai
- District: Kudymkarsky District
- Time zone: UTC+5:00

Demino (Russian: Демино) is a rural locality (a village) in Verkh-Invenskoye Rural Settlement, Kudymkarsky District, Perm Krai, Russia. The population was 324 as of 2010. There are 7 streets.

== Geography ==
Demino is located 37 km southwest of Kudymkar (the district's administrative centre) by road. Senina is the nearest rural locality.
