= Demino, Sheksninsky District, Vologda Oblast =

Demino Демино
- Village
- Location within Vologda Oblast Location within Russia
- Coordinates: 59°20′N 38°39′E
- Country: Russia
- Region: Vologda Oblast
- District: Sheksninsky District
- Time zone: UTC+3:00

Demino (Russian: Демино) is a rural locality (a village) in Sizemskoye Rural Settlement, Sheksninsky District, Vologda Oblast, Russia. The population was 10 as of 2002.

== Geography ==
Demino is located 55 km northeast of Sheksna (the district's administrative centre) by road. Gushchino is the nearest rural locality.
