= Demino, Vysokovsky Selsoviet, Vologodsky District, Vologda Oblast =

Demino Демино
- Village
- Location within Vologda Oblast Location within Russia
- Coordinates: 59°26′N 39°10′E
- Country: Russia
- Region: Vologda Oblast
- District: Vologodsky District
- Time zone: UTC+3:00

Demino (Russian: Демино) is a rural locality (a village) in Kubenskoye Rural Settlement, Vologodsky District, Vologda Oblast, Russia. The population was 9 as of 2002.

== Geography ==
The distance to Vologda is 75 km, to Kubenskoye is 28 km. Dulovo, Yefimovo, Krivoye, Babik, Dolmatovo, Lavrentyevo, Krinki are the nearest rural localities.
