= Dyomino, Gus-Khrustalny District, Vladimir Oblast =

Dyomino Дёмино
- Village
- Location within Vladimir Oblast Location within Russia
- Coordinates: 55°35′N 40°31′E
- Country: Russia
- Region: Vladimir Oblast
- District: Gus-Khrustalny District
- Time zone: UTC+3:00

Dyomino (Russian: Дёмино) is a rural locality (a village) in Posyolok Urshelsky, Gus-Khrustalny District, Vladimir Oblast, Russia. The population was 17 as of 2010.

== Geography ==
Dyomino is located 13 km southwest of Gus-Khrustalny (the district's administrative centre) by road. Narmuch is the nearest rural locality.
