= Dyomino, Perm Krai =

Dyomino Дёмино
- Village
- Location within Perm Krai Location within Russia
- Coordinates: 59°37′N 54°19′E
- Country: Russia
- Region: Perm Krai
- District: Kochyovsky District
- Time zone: UTC+5:00

Dyomino (Russian: Дёмино) is a rural locality (a village) in Kochyovskoye Rural Settlement, Kochyovsky District, Perm Krai, Russia. The population was 94 as of 2010. There are 11 streets.

== Geography ==
Dyomino is located 4 km north of Kochyovo (the district's administrative centre) by road. Kochyovo is the nearest rural locality.
