= Dyomino, Kovrovsky District, Vladimir Oblast =

Dyomino Дёмино
- Village
- Location within Vladimir Oblast Location within Russia
- Coordinates: 56°06′N 41°16′E
- Country: Russia
- Region: Vladimir Oblast
- District: Kovrovsky District
- Time zone: UTC+3:00

Dyomino (Russian: Дёмино) is a rural locality (a village) in Novoselskoye Rural Settlement, Kovrovsky District, Vladimir Oblast, Russia. The population was 11 as of 2010.

== Geography ==
Dyomino is located 32 km southwest of Kovrov (the district's administrative centre) by road. Marinino is the nearest rural locality.
