= Demino Ski Marathon =

Cross-country skiing marathon in Russia

Demino Ski Marathon Дёминский лыжный марафон
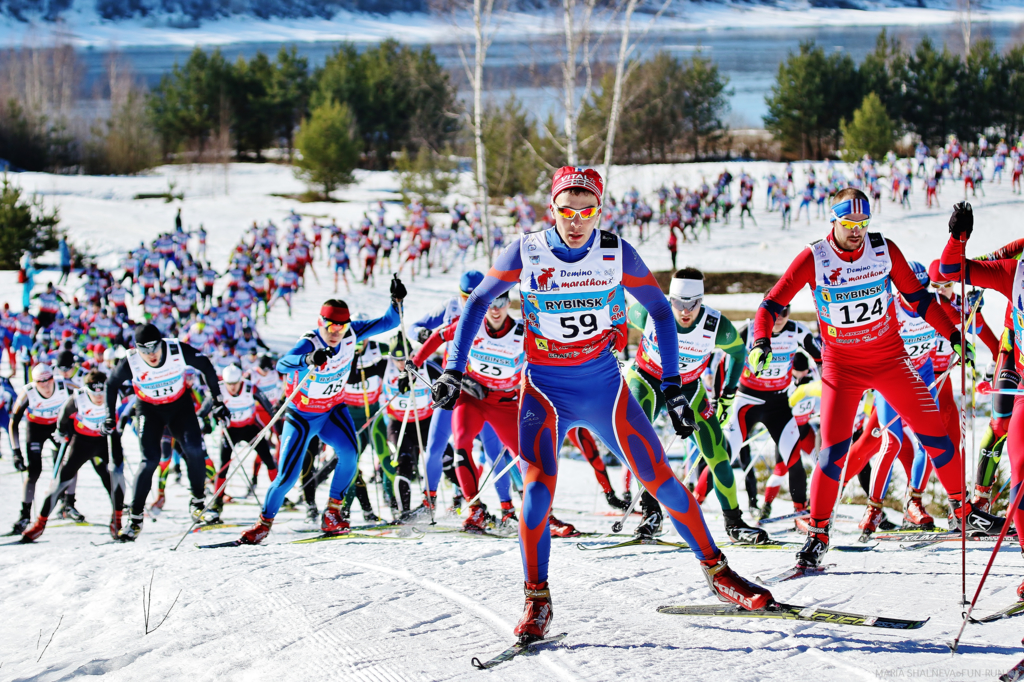
- Demino Ski Marathon, 2015
- Status: active
- Genre: sporting event
- Date: March
- Frequency: annual
- Location: Rybinsk
- Country: Russia
- Inaugurated: 2007
- Participants: 1402
- Website: https://marathon.demino.com/ski

The Demino Ski Marathon (Russian: Дёминский лыжный марафон) is a cross-country skiing marathon in Russia. It has been held since 2007 and was appointed as a Worldloppet event in June 2012. It is the most popular ski race in Russia (1402 participants in 2015).

The Demino Ski Marathon has been a member of the Russialoppet since 2008.

The main distance is 50 km free style, in one or two laps. The race is held on Ski Center Demino, near Rybinsk city. The ski marathon is a part of the Demino Cup, which includes also a cross-country cycling marathon and running half-marathon.

The only time the marathon has been cancelled was in 2014 due to lack of snow.

Winners

Year	Number of finishers	Men	Time	Ladies	Time
2007	86	Russia Alexander Abramov	2:40:55 (52 km)	Russia Irina Semerikova	1:39:56 (30 km)
2008	399	Norway Anders Aukland	2:07:36	Russia Ludmila Tsypulina	1:23:39 (30 km)
2009	1357	Belarus Aliaksei Ivanou	2:11:04	Russia Olga Rocheva	2:19:09
2010	1020	Belarus Aliaksei Ivanou	2:11:41	Russia Natalya Zernova	2:20:00
2011	1192	Russia Sergey Shiryayev	2:03:03,2	Russia Natalya Zernova	2:17:26,10
2012	1291	Russia Vadim Nesterov	2:03:49,0	Belarus Ekaterina Rudakova	2:17:27,2
2013	1645	Italia Florian Kostner	2:28:18	Russia Olga Mikhaylova	2:43:11
2014	cancelled				
2015	1402	Russia Sergey Turyshev	01:48:49.6	Belarus Ekaterina Rudakova	01:55:36.4
2016	1585	Russia Yevgeny Dementyev	01:45:01.5	Russia Olga Rocheva	01:54:39.8
