= Jari Laukkanen (cross-country skier) =

Finnish cross-country skier (1962–2019)

Personal information
- Full name: Jari Johannes Laukkanen
- Nationality: Finland
- Born: 8 June 1962 Viitasaari, Finland
- Died: 7 October 2019 (aged 57) Viitasaari, Finland

Sport
- Sport: Skiing
- Club: Viitasaaren Viesti

World Cup career
- Seasons: 6 – (1983–1984, 1986–1989)
- Indiv. starts: 11
- Indiv. podiums: 0
- Team starts: 3
- Team podiums: 1
- Team wins: 0
- Overall titles: 0 – (21st in 1987)

Jari Johannes Laukkanen (8 June 1962 – 7 October 2019) was a Finnish cross-country skier who competed from 1987 to 1988. He finished eighth in the 4 × 10 km relay at the 1988 Winter Olympics in Calgary. He was born in Viitasaari, Central Finland. Laukkanen died on 7 October 2019 from an unknown illness; he was known to suffer from heart issues.

Laukkanen's best finish at the FIS Nordic World Ski Championships was ninth in the 15 km event at Oberstdorf in 1987. His best World Cup finish was sixth in a 15 km event in Canada in 1987.

== Cross-country skiing results ==
All results are sourced from the International Ski Federation (FIS).

=== Olympic Games ===
Year	Age	15 km	30 km	50 km	4 × 10 km relay
1988	25	25	52	—	8

=== World Championships ===
Year	Age	15 km classical	15 km freestyle	30 km	50 km	4 × 10 km relay
1987	24	9	—N/a	12	—	6
1989	26	—	—	31	—	—

=== World Cup ===
==== Season standings ====
Season	Age	Overall
1983	20	NC
1984	21	NC
1986	23	NC
1987	24	21
1988	25	33
1989	26	NC

==== Team podiums ====
- 1 podium

No.	Season	Date	Location	Race	Level	Place	Teammates
1	1986–87	19 March 1987	Oslo, Norway	4 × 10 km Relay C	World Cup	2nd	Kirvesniemi / Ristanen / Karvonen
