= Holger Bauroth =

German cross-country skier (born 1965)

Personal information
- Nationality: Germany
- Born: 7 February 1965 (age 61) Suhl, East Germany

Sport
- Sport: Skiing
- Club: ASK Vorwärts Oberhof

World Cup career
- Seasons: 6 – (1986–1989, 1991–1992)
- Indiv. starts: 23
- Indiv. podiums: 4
- Indiv. wins: 0
- Team starts: 3
- Team podiums: 0
- Overall titles: 0 – (4th in 1988)
Medal record
Representing East Germany
Men's cross-country skiing
Junior World Championships
| Gold medal – first place | 1984 Trondheim | 15 km |
| Silver medal – second place | 1984 Trondheim | 3 × 5 km relay |
| Silver medal – second place | 1985 Täsch | 15 km |
| Bronze medal – third place | 1983 Kuopio | 3 × 5 km relay |

Holger Bauroth (born 7 February 1965) is an East German-German cross-country skier who competed from 1986 to 1995. He finished fifth in the 50 km event at the 1988 Winter Olympics in Calgary.

Bauroth finished ninth in the 15 km event at the 1989 FIS Nordic World Ski Championships in Lahti. His best World Cup finish was second three times at various distances (twice in 1988, once in 1989).

== Cross-country skiing results ==
All results are sourced from the International Ski Federation (FIS).

=== Olympic Games ===
| Year | Age | 10 km | 15 km | Pursuit | 30 km | 50 km | 4 × 10 km relay |
|---|---|---|---|---|---|---|---|
| 1988 | 23 | —N/a | 21 | —N/a | 22 | 5 | — |
| 1992 | 27 | — | —N/a | — | 28 | 26 | 6 |

=== World Championships ===
| Year | Age | 10 km | 15 km classical | 15 km freestyle | 30 km | 50 km | 4 × 10 km relay |
|---|---|---|---|---|---|---|---|
| 1985 | 20 | —N/a | —N/a | 41 | — | — | — |
| 1987 | 22 | —N/a | — | —N/a | — | — | 10 |
| 1989 | 24 | —N/a | — | 9 | 11 | 27 | 6 |
| 1991 | 26 | 35 | —N/a | 19 | 19 | 23 | 10 |

=== World Cup ===
==== Season standings ====
| Season | Age | Overall |
|---|---|---|
| 1986 | 21 | 45 |
| 1987 | 22 | 50 |
| 1988 | 23 | 4 |
| 1989 | 24 | 7 |
| 1991 | 26 | NC |
| 1992 | 27 | NC |

==== Individual podiums ====
- 4 podiums

| No. | Season | Date | Location | Race | Level | Place |
|---|---|---|---|---|---|---|
| 1 | 1987–88 | 15 January 1988 | Štrbské Pleso, Czechoslovakia | 15 km Individual F | World Cup | 2nd |
| 2 | 1987–88 | 12 March 1988 | Falun, Sweden | 15 km Individual F | World Cup | 3rd |
| 3 | 1988–89 | 15 January 1989 | Nové Město, Czechoslovakia | 30 km Individual C | World Cup | 3rd |
| 4 | 1988–89 | 4 March 1989 | Oslo, Norway | 50 km Individual C | World Cup | 2nd |
