= Simone Opitz =

East German-German cross-country skier

Personal information
- Nationality: Germany
- Born: 3 July 1963 (age 63) Sonneberg, Bezirk Suhl, East Germany

Sport
- Sport: Skiing

World Cup career
- Seasons: 6 – (1985–1988, 1991–1992)
- Indiv. starts: 27
- Indiv. podiums: 3
- Indiv. wins: 1
- Team starts: 6
- Team podiums: 1
- Team wins: 0
- Overall titles: 0 – (5th in 1986)

Simone Opitz (born 3 July 1963 in Sonneberg, Bezirk Suhl) is an East German-German cross-country skier who competed from 1985 to 1993. Competing in two Winter Olympics, she earned best finish of fifth twice at the 1988 Winter Olympics in Calgary (20 km, 4 × 5 km relay).

Opitz's best finish at the FIS Nordic World Ski Championships was fifth in the 10 km event at Val di Fiemme in 1991. Her only World Cup victory was in a 20 km event in Czechoslovakia in 1986.

== Cross-country skiing results ==
All results are sourced from the International Ski Federation (FIS).

=== Olympic Games ===
Year	Age	5 km	10 km	15 km	Pursuit	20 km	30 km	4 × 5 km relay
1988	24	13	10	—N/a	—N/a	5	—N/a	5
1992	28	27	—N/a	—	12	—N/a	8	8

=== World Championships ===
Year	Age	5 km	10 km	15 km	20 km	30 km	4 × 5 km relay
1987	23	—	—	—N/a	21	—N/a	4
1991	27	37	5	—	—N/a	7	5

=== World Cup ===
==== Season standings ====
Season	Age	Overall
1985	21	17
1986	22	5
1987	23	39
1988	24	17
1991	27	14
1992	28	19

==== Individual podiums ====
- 1 victory
- 3 podiums

No.	Season	Date	Location	Race	Level	Place
1	1985–86	11 January 1986	Les Saisies, France	10 km Individual F	World Cup	3rd
2	1985–86	18 January 1986	Nové Město, Czechoslovakia	20 km Individual F	World Cup	1st
3	1985–86	15 March 1986	Oslo, Norway	10 km Individual F	World Cup	2nd

==== Team podiums ====
- 1 podium

No.	Season	Date	Location	Race	Level	Place	Teammates
1	1984–85	17 March 1985	Oslo, Norway	4 × 5 km Relay	World Cup	3rd	Misersky / Nestler / Noack
