= Jan Ottosson =

Swedish cross-country skier

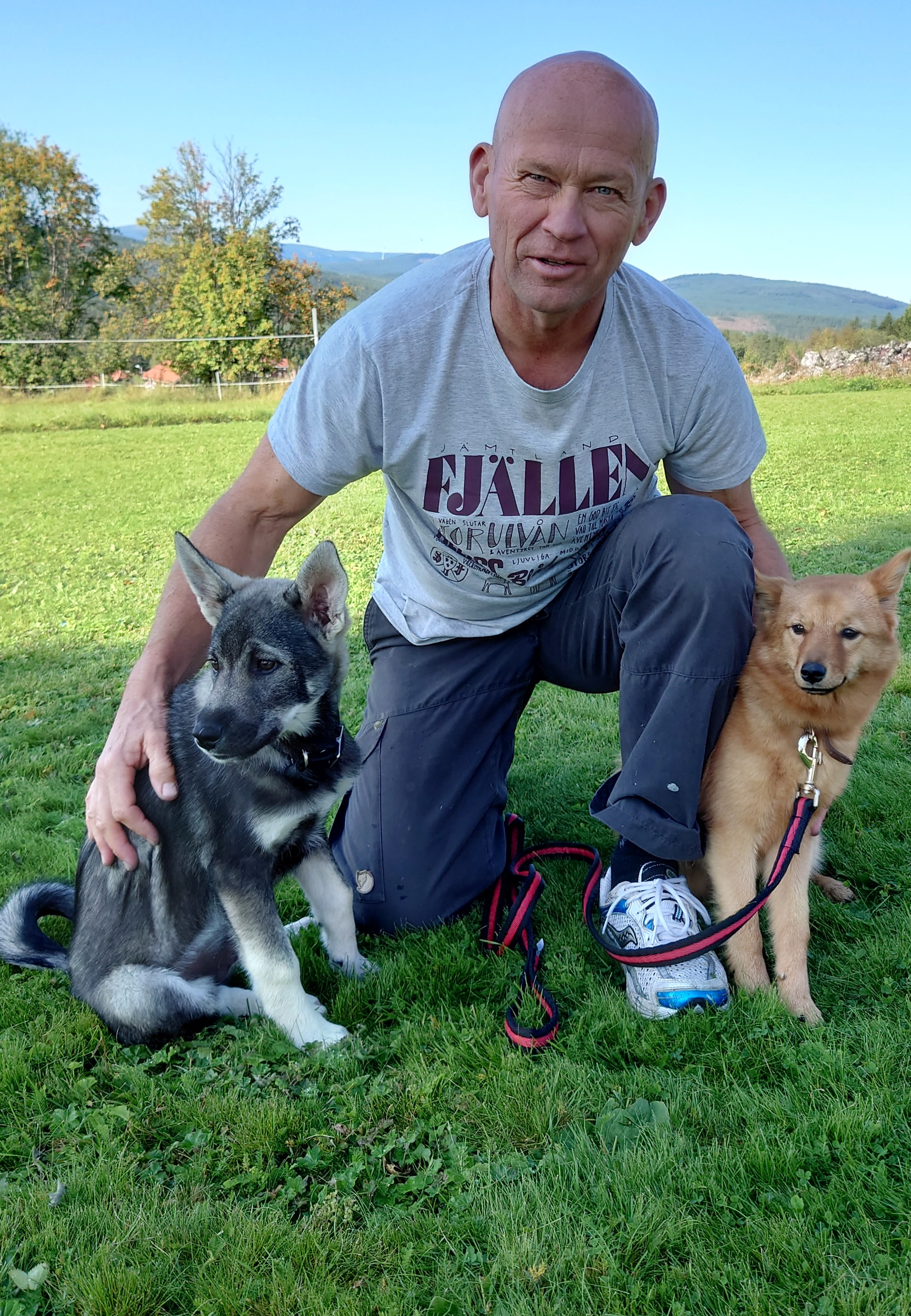

Personal information
- Full name: Jan Bo Ottosson
- Nationality: Sweden
- Born: 10 March 1960 (age 66) Högsäter, Sweden

Sport
- Sport: Skiing
- Club: Åsarna IK

World Cup career
- Seasons: 13 – (1982–1994)
- Indiv. starts: 75
- Indiv. podiums: 5
- Indiv. wins: 1
- Team starts: 13
- Team podiums: 9
- Team wins: 6
- Overall titles: 0 – (7th in 1982)
Medal record
Men's cross-country skiing
Representing Sweden
| Event | 1st | 2nd | 3rd |
|---|---|---|---|
| Olympic Games | 2 | 0 | 0 |
| Total | 2 | 0 | 0 |
Olympic Games
| Gold medal – first place | 1984 Sarajevo | 4 × 10 km relay |
| Gold medal – first place | 1988 Calgary | 4 × 10 km relay |
Junior World Championships
| Silver medal – second place | 1979 Mont Sainte-Anne | 3 × 5 km relay |
| Silver medal – second place | 1980 Örnsköldsvik | 3 × 5 km relay |

Jan Ottosson (born 10 March 1960 in Högsäter, Dalsland) is a former Swedish cross-country skier. A national team skier, he also represented Åsarna IK during the 1980s and early 1990s. He won two gold medals in the 4 × 10 km relay at the Winter Olympics (1984 and 1988), providing some of the most iconic and impressive legs of Swedish Olympic history. Additionally, he finished sixth in the 50 km event at the 1988 Winter Olympics, sixth in the 15 km event at the 1991 Nordic skiing World Championships, won eight individual Swedish championships, and won ten Swedish championship gold medals in the relays. Ottosson in best known is for winning the Vasaloppet four times in (1989, 1991, 1992, 1994). After his active career with the Åsarnas squad, Ottosson now works as an official on the Bergs ski center. Currently, Ottosson runs his own Vasaloppet training program, where the former champion helps others prepare for the race. Ottosson also owns a state-of-the-art ski grinding machine and a ski waxing business which the former champion uses to perfect patrons' skis for Vasaloppet race conditions.

== Cross-country skiing results ==
All results are sourced from the International Ski Federation (FIS).

=== Olympic Games ===
- 2 medals – (2 gold)

| Year | Age | 10 km | 15 km | Pursuit | 30 km | 50 km | 4 × 10 km relay |
|---|---|---|---|---|---|---|---|
| 1984 | 23 | —N/a | — | —N/a | 16 | 14 | Gold |
| 1988 | 27 | —N/a | 16 | —N/a | 16 | 6 | Gold |
| 1992 | 31 | — | —N/a | — | 11 | 44 | 4 |
| 1994 | 33 | 14 | —N/a | 15 | — | 18 | 6 |

=== World Championships ===
| Year | Age | 10 km | 15 km classical | 15 km freestyle | Pursuit | 30 km | 50 km | 4 × 10 km relay |
|---|---|---|---|---|---|---|---|---|
| 1982 | 21 | —N/a | 9 | —N/a | —N/a | — | — | 5 |
| 1985 | 24 | —N/a | — | —N/a | —N/a | 30 | — | — |
| 1987 | 26 | —N/a | — | —N/a | —N/a | — | 10 | — |
| 1989 | 28 | —N/a | — | 19 | —N/a | 12 | — | — |
| 1991 | 30 | — | —N/a | 6 | —N/a | 26 | 7 | — |
| 1993 | 32 | — | —N/a | —N/a | — | 15 | 10 | 6 |

=== World Cup ===
==== Season standings ====
| Season | Age | Overall |
|---|---|---|
| 1982 | 22 | 7 |
| 1983 | 23 | 30 |
| 1984 | 24 | 9 |
| 1985 | 25 | 28 |
| 1986 | 26 | 12 |
| 1987 | 27 | 26 |
| 1988 | 28 | 8 |
| 1989 | 29 | 17 |
| 1990 | 30 | 9 |
| 1991 | 31 | 16 |
| 1992 | 32 | 42 |
| 1993 | 33 | 13 |
| 1994 | 34 | 23 |

==== Individual podiums ====
- 1 victory
- 5 podiums

| No. | Season | Date | Location | Race | Level | Place |
|---|---|---|---|---|---|---|
| 1 | 1982–83 | 14 January 1983 | Reit im Winkl, West Germany | 15 km Individual | World Cup | 1st |
| 2 | 1983–84 | 16 December 1983 | Ramsau, Austria | 30 km Individual | World Cup | 3rd |
| 3 | 1984–85 | 3 March 1985 | Lahti, Finland | 50 km Individual | World Cup | 2nd |
| 4 | 1987–88 | 19 December 1987 | Davos, Switzerland | 15 km Individual C | World Cup | 3rd |
| 5 | 1990–91 | 9 March 1991 | Falun, Sweden | 30 km Individual F | World Cup | 3rd |

==== Team podiums ====
- 6 victories
- 9 podiums

| No. | Season | Date | Location | Race | Level | Place | Teammates |
|---|---|---|---|---|---|---|---|
| 1 | 1983–84 | 16 February 1984 | (Socialist Federal Republic of Yugoslavia) Sarajevo, Yugoslavia | 4 × 10 km Relay | Olympic Games^{[1]} | 1st | Wassberg / Kohlberg / Svan |
| 2 | 1983–84 | 26 February 1984 | Falun, Sweden | 4 × 10 km Relay | World Cup | 1st | Östlund / Wassberg / Svan |
| 3 | 1986–87 | 19 March 1987 | Oslo, Norway | 4 × 10 km Relay C | World Cup | 1st | Wassberg / Mogren / Eriksson |
| 4 | 1987–88 | 24 February 1988 | Calgary, Canada | 4 × 10 km Relay F | Olympic Games^{[1]} | 1st | Wassberg / Svan / Mogren |
| 5 | 1987–88 | 13 March 1988 | Falun, Sweden | 4 × 10 km Relay F | World Cup | 1st | Svan / Mogren / Majbäck |
| 6 | 1987–88 | 17 March 1988 | Oslo, Norway | 4 × 10 km Relay C | World Cup | 2nd | Mogren / Majbäck / Svan |
| 7 | 1989–90 | 1 March 1990 | Lahti, Finland | 4 × 10 km Relay F | World Cup | 3rd | Forsberg / Mogren / Håland |
| 8 | 1989–90 | 11 March 1990 | Örnsköldsvik, Sweden | 4 × 10 km Relay C/F | World Cup | 1st | Majbäck / Forsberg / Mogren |
| 9 | 1991–92 | 8 March 1992 | Funäsdalen, Sweden | 4 × 10 km Relay C | World Cup | 3rd | Ponsiluoma / Mogren / Forsberg |

Note: ^{1} Until the 1994 Winter Olympics, Olympic races were included in the World Cup scoring system.
