= Thomas Eriksson (skier) =

Swedish cross-country skier

Personal information
- Nationality: Sweden
- Born: 7 October 1959 (age 66) Borlänge, Sweden

Sport
- Sport: Skiing
- Club: Domnarvets GoIF

World Cup career
- Seasons: 12 – (1982–1993)
- Indiv. starts: 41
- Indiv. podiums: 5
- Indiv. wins: 2
- Team starts: 9
- Team podiums: 9
- Team wins: 5
- Overall titles: 0 – (6th in 1986)
Medal record
Men's cross-country skiing
Representing Sweden
World Championships
| Gold medal – first place | 1982 Oslo | 30 km |
| Silver medal – second place | 1991 Val di Fiemme | 4 × 10 km relay |
| Bronze medal – third place | 1985 Seefeld | 4 × 10 km relay |
Junior World Championships
| Gold medal – first place | 1979 Mont-Sainte-Anne | 15 km |
| Silver medal – second place | 1979 Mont-Sainte-Anne | 3 × 5 km relay |

Thomas Eriksson (born 7 October 1959) is a Swedish cross-country skier who competed from 1982 to 1997. He won a complete set of medals at the FIS Nordic World Ski Championships with a gold in the 30 km (1982), a silver in the 4 × 10 km relay (1991), and a bronze in the 4 × 10 km relay (1985).

== Cross-country skiing results ==
All results are sourced from the International Ski Federation (FIS).

=== Olympic Games ===
| Year | Age | 15 km | 30 km | 50 km | 4 × 10 km relay |
|---|---|---|---|---|---|
| 1980 | 20 | 11 | — | 16 | 5 |

=== World Championships ===
- 3 medals – (1 gold, 1 silver, 1 bronze)

| Year | Age | 10 km | 15 km classical | 15 km freestyle | Pursuit | 30 km | 50 km | 4 × 10 km relay |
|---|---|---|---|---|---|---|---|---|
| 1982 | 22 | —N/a | DNF | —N/a | —N/a | Gold | DNF | — |
| 1985 | 25 | —N/a | — | —N/a | —N/a | 27 | — | Bronze |
| 1987 | 27 | —N/a | — | —N/a | —N/a | 11 | 17 | — |
| 1989 | 29 | —N/a | 5 | — | —N/a | 21 | 9 | — |
| 1991 | 31 | 7 | —N/a | — | —N/a | — | — | Silver |
| 1993 | 33 | 36 | —N/a | —N/a | 27 | — | — | — |

=== World Cup ===
==== Season standings ====
| Season | Age | Overall |
|---|---|---|
| 1982 | 22 | 17 |
| 1983 | 23 | NC |
| 1984 | 24 | 54 |
| 1985 | 25 | 28 |
| 1986 | 26 | 6 |
| 1987 | 27 | 8 |
| 1988 | 28 | 23 |
| 1989 | 29 | 12 |
| 1990 | 30 | 33 |
| 1991 | 31 | 15 |
| 1992 | 32 | NC |
| 1993 | 33 | 93 |

==== Individual podiums ====
- 2 victories
- 5 podiums

| No. | Season | Date | Location | Race | Level | Place |
|---|---|---|---|---|---|---|
| 1 | 1981–82 | 20 February 1982 | Oslo, Norway | 30 km Individual | World Championships^{[1]} | 1st |
| 2 | 1985–86 | 8 March 1986 | Falun, Sweden | 30 km Individual C | World Cup | 2nd |
| 3 | 1986–87 | 20 December 1986 | Davos, Switzerland | 30 km Individual C | World Cup | 1st |
| 4 | 1986–87 | 21 March 1987 | Oslo, Norway | 50 km Individual C | World Cup | 3rd |
| 5 | 1990–91 | 15 December 1990 | Davos, Switzerland | 15 km Individual C | World Cup | 3rd |

==== Team podiums ====
- 5 victories
- 9 podiums

| No. | Season | Date | Location | Race | Level | Place | Teammates |
|---|---|---|---|---|---|---|---|
| 1 | 1984–85 | 24 January 1985 | Seefeld, Austria | 4 × 10 km Relay | World Championships^{[1]} | 3rd | Östlund / Wassberg / Svan |
| 2 | 1984–85 | 17 March 1985 | Oslo, Norway | 4 × 10 km Relay | World Cup | 1st | Danielsson / Wassberg / Svan |
| 3 | 1985–86 | 9 March 1986 | Falun, Sweden | 4 × 10 km Relay F | World Cup | 1st | Östlund / Mogren / Svan |
| 4 | 1985–86 | 13 March 1986 | Oslo, Norway | 4 × 10 km Relay F | World Cup | 1st | Östlund / Mogren / Svan |
| 5 | 1986–87 | 19 March 1987 | Oslo, Norway | 4 × 10 km Relay C | World Cup | 1st | Ottosson / Wassberg / Mogren |
| 6 | 1987–88 | 17 March 1988 | Oslo, Norway | 4 × 10 km Relay C | World Cup | 3rd | Forsberg / Håland / Kohlberg |
| 7 | 1988–89 | 5 March 1989 | Oslo, Norway | 4 × 10 km Relay F | World Cup | 1st | Majbäck / Mogren / Håland |
| 8 | 1990–91 | 15 February 1991 | Val di Fiemme, Italy | 4 × 10 km Relay C/F | World Championships^{[1]} | 2nd | Majbäck / Svan / Mogren |
| 9 | 1990–91 | 1 March 1991 | Lahti, Finland | 4 × 10 km Relay C/F | World Cup | 3rd | Svan / Mogren / Forsberg |

Note: ^{1} Until the 1999 World Championships, World Championship races were included in the World Cup scoring system.
