= Torgny Mogren =

Swedish cross-country skier

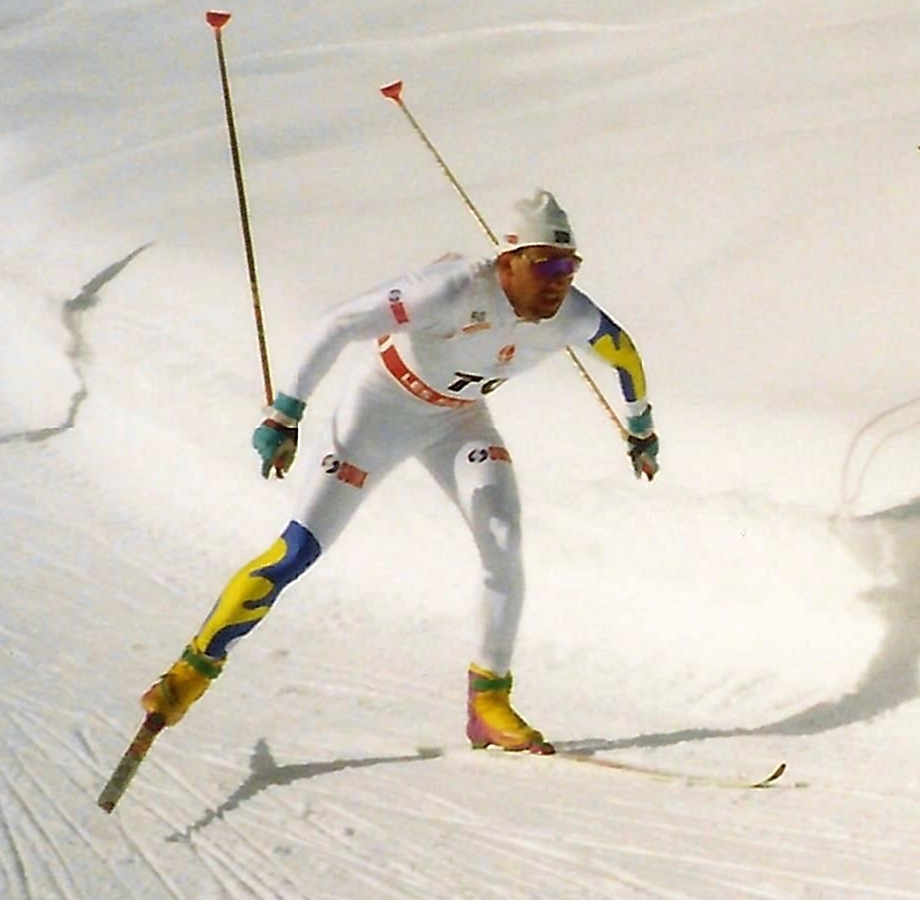
- Mogren during the 1992 Winter Olympics

Personal information
- Full name: Nils Arne Torgny Mogren
- Nationality: Sweden
- Born: 26 July 1963 (age 62) Hällefors, Sweden

Sport
- Sport: Skiing
- Club: Åsarna IK

World Cup career
- Seasons: 15 – (1984–1998)
- Indiv. starts: 137
- Indiv. podiums: 37
- Indiv. wins: 13
- Team starts: 40
- Team podiums: 29
- Team wins: 11
- Overall titles: 1 – (1987)
- Discipline titles: 0
Medal record
Men's cross-country skiing
Representing Sweden
International nordic ski competitions
Event	1st	2nd	3rd
Olympic Games	1	0	0
World Championships	4	3	2
Total	5	3	2
Olympic Games
Gold medal – first place	1988 Calgary	4 × 10 km relay
World Championships
Gold medal – first place	1987 Oberstdorf	4 × 10 km relay
Gold medal – first place	1989 Lahti	4 × 10 km relay
Gold medal – first place	1991 Val di Fiemme	50 km freestyle
Gold medal – first place	1993 Falun	50 km freestyle
Silver medal – second place	1989 Lahti	15 km freestyle
Silver medal – second place	1989 Lahti	50 km freestyle
Silver medal – second place	1991 Val di Fiemme	4 × 10 km relay
Bronze medal – third place	1987 Oberstdorf	50 km freestyle
Bronze medal – third place	1991 Val di Fiemme	10 km classical

Torgny Mogren (born 26 July 1963) is a Swedish former cross-country skier who competed from 1984 to 1998. He won the gold medal in the 4 × 10 km relay at the 1988 Winter Olympics in Calgary. His best individual finish was a fifth in the combined pursuit at the 1992 Winter Olympics in Albertville.

Mogren's biggest successes occurred at the FIS Nordic World Ski Championships where he earned nine medals. This included four golds (4 × 10 km relay: 1987, 1989; 50 km: 1991, 1993), three silvers (15 km, 30 km: both 1989; 4 × 10 km relay: 1991), and two bronzes (50 km: 1987, 10 km: 1991). He won the overall World Cup in 1986–87, and ended five times in the top three overall.

He competed for the club Åsarna IK throughout his career. Mogren received the Svenska Dagbladet Gold Medal in 1993 and the Jerring Award the same year.

He retired from cross-country skiing following the 1997–98 season. Since retiring, he has been working as a sales representative for Swedish tap manufacturer FM Mattsson, one of his sponsors during his active career. He has been Swedish Radio's main biathlon and cross-country skiing expert commentator since 2003, covering the Olympics and World Championships.

== Cross-country skiing results ==
All results are sourced from the International Ski Federation (FIS).

=== Olympic Games ===
- 1 medal – (1 gold)

Year	Age	10 km	15 km	Pursuit	30 km	50 km	4 × 10 km relay
1984	20	—N/a	22	—N/a	23	—	—
1988	24	—N/a	24	—N/a	11	28	Gold
1992	28	9	—N/a	5	—	12	4
1994	30	27	—N/a	DNS	24	—	—
1998	34	DNS	—N/a	—	—	34	—

=== World Championships ===
- 9 medals – (4 gold, 3 silver, 2 bronze)

Year	Age	10 km	15 km classical	15 km freestyle	Pursuit	30 km	50 km	4 × 10 km relay
1985	21	—N/a	20	—N/a	—N/a	11	6	—
1987	23	—N/a	17	—N/a	—N/a	18	Bronze	Gold
1989	25	—N/a	—	Silver	—N/a	9	Silver	Gold
1991	27	Bronze	—N/a	8	—N/a	—	Gold	Silver
1993	29	8	—N/a	—N/a	6	14	Gold	6
1995	31	38	—N/a	—N/a	22	—	7	4
1997	33	—	—N/a	—N/a	—	12	8	5

=== World Cup ===
==== Season titles ====
- 1 title – (1 overall)

Season
Season	Discipline
1987	Overall

==== Season standings ====
Season	Age			
Season	Age	Overall	Long Distance	Sprint
1984	20	18	—N/a	—N/a
1985	21	6	—N/a	—N/a
1986	22	2nd place, silver medalist(s)	—N/a	—N/a
1987	23	1st place, gold medalist(s)	—N/a	—N/a
1988	24	2nd place, silver medalist(s)	—N/a	—N/a
1989	25	3rd place, bronze medalist(s)	—N/a	—N/a
1990	26	6	—N/a	—N/a
1991	27	2nd place, silver medalist(s)	—N/a	—N/a
1992	28	5	—N/a	—N/a
1993	29	4	—N/a	—N/a
1994	30	8	—N/a	—N/a
1995	31	9	—N/a	—N/a
1996	32	9	—N/a	—N/a
1997	33	19	15	23
1998	34	16	16	16

==== Individual podiums ====
- 13 victories
- 37 podiums

No.	Season	Date	Location	Race	Level	Place
1	1985–86	15 January 1986	(Socialist Federal Republic of Yugoslavia) Bohinj, Yugoslavia	5 km Individual F	World Cup	1st
2	1985–86	2 March 1986	Lahti, Finland	15 km Individual F	World Cup	1st
3	1985–86	14 March 1986	Oslo, Norway	50 km Individual C	World Cup	2nd
4	1986–87	13 December 1986	Cogne, Italy	15 km Individual F	World Cup	2nd
5	1986–87	10 January 1987	Canmore, Canada	15 km Individual C	World Cup	2nd
6	1986–87	21 February 1987	Oberstdorf, West Germany	50 km Individual F	World Championships^{[1]}	3rd
7	1986–87	1 March 1987	Lahti, Finland	30 km Individual F	World Cup	2nd
8	1986–87	7 March 1987	Falun, Sweden	30 km Individual F	World Cup	3rd
9	1986–87	14 March 1987	Kavgolovo, Soviet Union	15 km Individual C	World Cup	1st
10	1987–88	12 December 1987	La Clusaz, France	15 km Individual F	World Cup	1st
11	1987–88	15 December 1987	Kastelruth, Italy	30 km Mass Start F	World Cup	1st
12	1987–88	15 January 1988	(Czechoslovak Socialist Republic) Štrbské Pleso, Czechoslovakia	15 km Individual F	World Cup	1st
13	1988–89	10 December 1988	Ramsau, Austria	5 km Individual F	World Cup	1st
14	1988–89	14 December 1988	(Socialist Federal Republic of Yugoslavia) Bohinj, Yugoslavia	30 km Individual F	World Cup	2nd
15	1988–89	17 December 1988	Val di Sole, Italy	15 km Individual F/C	World Cup	2nd
16	1988–89	20 February 1989	Lahti, Finland	15 km Individual F	World Championships^{[1]}	2nd
17	1988–89	26 February 1989	Lahti, Finland	50 km Individual F	World Championships^{[1]}	2nd
18	1988–89	4 March 1989	Oslo, Norway	50 km Individual C	World Cup	3rd
19	1988–89	11 March 1989	Falun, Sweden	30 km Individual F	World Cup	2nd
20	1989–90	13 January 1990	Moscow, Soviet Union	30 km Individual F	World Cup	3rd
21	1989–90	17 February 1990	(Switzerland) Campra, Norway	15 km Individual F	World Cup	3rd
22	1989–90	25 February 1990	Reit im Winkl, West Germany	30 km Individual F	World Cup	2nd
23	1989–90	17 March 1990	Vang, Norway	50 km Individual F	World Cup	2nd
24	1990–91	9 December 1990	Tauplitzalm, Austria	10 km + 15 km Individual C/F	World Cup	1st
25	1990–91	19 December 1990	Les Saisies, France	30 km Individual C	World Cup	2nd
26	1990–91	17 February 1991	Val di Fiemme, Italy	50 km Individual F	World Championships^{[1]}	1st
27	1990–91	9 March 1991	Falun, Sweden	30 km Individual F	World Cup	2nd
28	1991–92	11 January 1992	Cogne, Italy	15 km Individual F	World Cup	2nd
29	1991–92	7 March 1992	Funäsdalen, Sweden	30 km Individual F	World Cup	1st
30	1992–93	3 January 1993	Kavgolovo, Russia	30 km Individual C	World Cup	3rd
31	1992–93	16 January 1993	Bohinj, Slovenia	15 km Individual F	World Cup	2nd
32	1992–93	28 February 1993	Falun, Sweden	50 km Individual F	World Championships^{[1]}	1st
33	1992–93	7 March 1993	Lahti, Finland	30 km Individual F	World Cup	1st
34	1993–94	11 December 1993	Santa Caterina, Italy	30 km Individual C	World Cup	2nd
36	1993–94	18 December 1993	Davos, Switzerland	15 km Individual F	World Cup	3rd
37	1994–95	20 December 1994	Sappada, Italy	10 km Individual F	World Cup	1st

==== Team podiums ====
- 11 victories – (11 RL)
- 29 podiums – (28 RL, 1 TS)

No.	Season	Date	Location	Race	Level	Place	Teammate(s)
1	1984–85	10 March 1985	Falun, Sweden	4 × 10 km Relay	World Cup	2nd	Östlund / Wassberg / Svan
2	1985–86	9 March 1986	Falun, Sweden	4 × 10 km Relay F	World Cup	1st	Östlund / Eriksson / Svan
3	1985–86	13 March 1986	Oslo, Norway	4 × 10 km Relay F	World Cup	1st	Östlund / Eriksson / Svan
4	1986–87	8 March 1987	Oberstdorf, West Germany	4 × 10 km Relay F	World Championships^{[1]}	1st	Östlund / Svan / Wassberg
5	1986–87	8 March 1987	Falun, Sweden	4 × 10 km Relay C	World Cup	1st	Östlund / Wassberg / Majbäck
6	1986–87	19 March 1987	Oslo, Norway	4 × 10 km Relay F	World Cup	1st	Ottosson / Wassberg / Eriksson
7	1987–88	4 February 1988	Calgary, Canada	4 × 10 km Relay F	Olympic Games^{[1]}	1st	Ottosson / Wassberg / Svan
8	1987–88	13 March 1988	Falun, Sweden	4 × 10 km Relay F	World Cup	1st	Ottosson / Svan / Majbäck
9	1987–88	17 March 1988	Oslo, Norway	4 × 10 km Relay C	World Cup	2nd	Ottosson / Majbäck / Svan
10	1988–89	24 February 1989	Lahti, Finland	4 × 10 km Relay C/F	World Championships^{[1]}	1st	Majbäck / Svan / Håland
11	1988–89	5 March 1989	Oslo, Norway	4 × 10 km Relay F	World Cup	1st	Eriksson / Majbäck / Håland
12	1988–89	12 March 1989	Falun, Sweden	4 × 10 km Relay C	World Cup	2nd	Majbäck / Poromaa / Håland
13	1989–90	1 March 1990	Lahti, Finland	4 × 10 km Relay F	World Cup	3rd	Forsberg / Ottosson / Håland
14	1989–90	11 March 1990	Örnsköldsvik, Sweden	4 × 10 km Relay C/F	World Cup	1st	Ottosson / Majbäck / Forsberg
15	1989–90	16 March 1990	Vang, Norway	4 × 10 km Relay C	World Cup	2nd	Håland / Majbäck / Forsberg
16	1990–91	15 February 1991	Val di Fiemme, Italy	4 × 10 km Relay C/F	World Championships^{[1]}	2nd	Eriksson / Svan / Majbäck
17	1990–91	1 March 1991	Lahti, Finland	4 × 10 km Relay C/F	World Cup	2nd	Håland / Eriksson / Svan / Forsberg
18	1991–92	8 March 1992	Funäsdalen, Sweden	4 × 10 km Relay C	World Cup	3rd	Ponsiluoma / Ottosson / Forsberg
19	1992–93	5 March 1993	Lahti, Finland	4 × 10 km Relay C	World Cup	1st	Majbäck / Jonsson / Håland
20	1993–94	13 March 1994	Falun, Sweden	4 × 10 km Relay F	World Cup	3rd	Bergström / Håland / Forsberg
21	1994–95	18 December 1994	Sappada, Italy	4 × 10 km Relay F	World Cup	3rd	Göransson / Majbäck / Forsberg
22	1994–95	12 February 1995	Oslo, Norway	4 × 5 km Relay C/F	World Cup	2nd	Fredriksson / Jonsson / Forsberg
23	1995–96	10 December 1995	Davos, Switzerland	4 × 10 km Relay C	World Cup	3rd	Göransson / Jonsson / Bergström
24	1995–96	2 February 1996	Seefeld, Austria	12 × 1.5 km Team Sprint F	World Cup	2nd	Jonsson
25	1995–96	25 February 1996	Trondheim, Norway	4 × 10 km Relay C/F	World Cup	3rd	Fredriksson / Jonsson / Bergström
26	1996–97	15 December 1996	Brusson, Italy	4 × 10 km Relay F	World Cup	3rd	Fredriksson / Bergström / Jonsson
27	1996–97	9 March 1997	Falun, Sweden	4 × 10 km Relay C/F	World Cup	3rd	Fredriksson / Forsberg / Bergström
28	1997–98	7 December 1997	Santa Caterina, Italy	4 × 10 km Relay F	World Cup	3rd	Bergström / Elofsson / Forsberg
29	1997–98	11 January 1998	Ramsau, Austria	4 × 10 km Relay C/F	World Cup	2nd	Fredriksson / Jonsson / Elofsson

Note: ^{1} Until the 1999 World Championships and the 1994 Winter Olympics, World Championship and Olympic races were included in the World Cup scoring system.

Preceded by Jan-Ove Waldner	Svenska Dagbladet Gold Medal; 1993	Succeeded by Swedish national football team
