= Thomas Wassberg =

Swedish cross-country skier (born 1956)

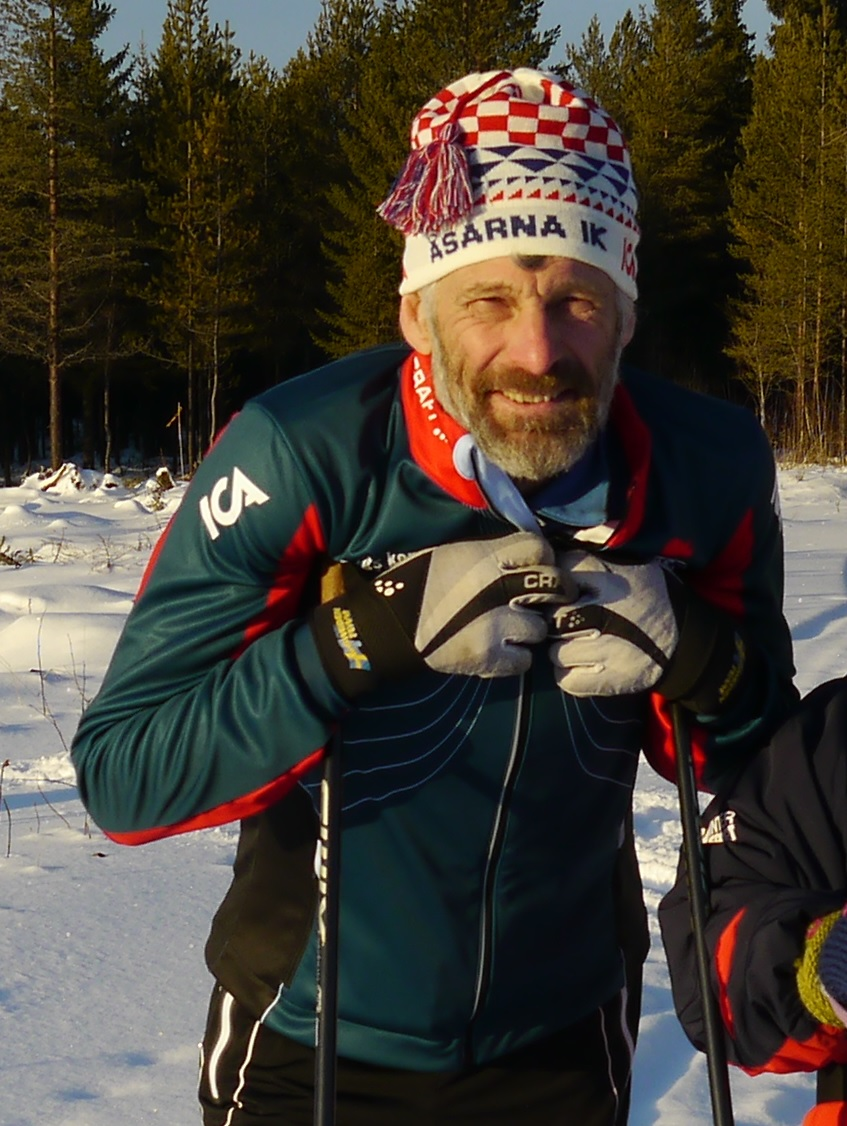
- Thomas Wassberg in December 2013

Personal information
- Full name: Lars Thomas Wassberg
- Nationality: Sweden
- Born: 27 March 1956 (age 70) Årjäng, Sweden
- Height: 185 cm (6 ft 1 in)

Sport
- Sport: Skiing
- Club: Åsarna IK

World Cup career
- Seasons: 7 – (1982–1988)
- Indiv. starts: 44
- Indiv. podiums: 18
- Indiv. wins: 6
- Team starts: 11
- Team podiums: 10
- Team wins: 7
- Overall titles: 0 – (2nd in 1982, 1984, 1987)
Medal record
Men's cross-country skiing
Representing Sweden
International nordic ski competitions
| Event | 1st | 2nd | 3rd |
|---|---|---|---|
| Olympic Games | 4 | 0 | 0 |
| World Championships | 3 | 3 | 1 |
| Total | 7 | 3 | 1 |
Olympic Games
| Gold medal – first place | 1980 Lake Placid | 15 km |
| Gold medal – first place | 1984 Sarajevo | 50 km |
| Gold medal – first place | 1984 Sarajevo | 4 × 10 km relay |
| Gold medal – first place | 1988 Calgary | 4 × 10 km relay |
World Championships
| Gold medal – first place | 1982 Oslo | 50 km |
| Gold medal – first place | 1987 Oberstdorf | 30 km classical |
| Gold medal – first place | 1987 Oberstdorf | 4 × 10 km relay |
| Silver medal – second place | 1985 Seefeld | 15 km |
| Silver medal – second place | 1987 Oberstdorf | 15 km classical |
| Silver medal – second place | 1987 Oberstdorf | 50 km freestyle |
| Bronze medal – third place | 1985 Seefeld | 4 × 10 km relay |

Lars Thomas Wassberg (born 27 March 1956) is a Swedish former cross-country skier. A fast skating style – push for every leg – is still called "Wassberg" after him in several countries. Wassberg's skiing idols when growing up were Sixten Jernberg and Oddvar Brå. He has described his mental strength and physical fitness as his greatest abilities as a skier, with his main weakness being a lack of sprinting ability.

Wassberg won four Olympic gold medals: in 15 km (1980), 50 km (1984), and the 4 × 10 km relay (1984, 1988), and served as the Olympic flag bearer for Sweden in 1988. At the FIS Nordic World Ski Championships, he earned three golds (50 km: 1982, 30 km: 1987, and 4 × 10 km relay: 1987), three silvers (15 km: 1985, 1987; 50 km (1987), and one bronze (4 × 10 km relay: 1985). Additionally, Wassberg won the 50 km at the Holmenkollen ski festival three times (1980, 1982 and 1987) and the 15 km twice (1979, 1985).

At the 1980 Winter Olympics in Lake Placid, Wassberg edged out Finland's Juha Mieto by 0.01 seconds in the 15 km, the closest cross-country ski race in Olympic history. Wassberg subsequently suggested to Mieto that the gold medal should be split between them "as one one-hundredth of a second is nothing in a 15-kilometer race". This incident led the International Ski Federation (FIS) to change their timing to the nearest one-tenth of a second. It also resulted in an apocryphal urban legend that Wassberg and Mieto's medals were cut in half and re-welded into half-gold, half-silver medals. At the 1984 Winter Olympics, Wassberg beat out fellow Swede Gunde Svan by 4.9 seconds in the 50 km, the closest margin of victory ever in that event until Giorgio Di Centa edged out Yevgeny Dementyev by 0.8 seconds at the 2006 Winter Olympics though the 2006 event was a mass start event while the 1984 event was an interval start event.

He won the World Cup in 1977, and in 1980 was awarded the Holmenkollen medal. For some reason his teammate Sven-Åke Lundbäck did not receive the Svenska Dagbladet Gold Medal in 1978. In protest to this decision Wassberg refused to accept his Svenska Dagbladet Gold Medal in 1980.

According to Bengt Erik Bengtsson, Chief of the Nordic Office of the FIS from 1984 to 2004, Wassberg was the first to suggest in 1984 the splitting of the sport of cross country skiing into classic and freestyle disciplines. This was subsequently implemented by FIS in 1986.

After retiring from competitions Wassberg worked as a sports reporter for Swedish Radio and a cross-country skiing coach for his club Åsarna IK. In 2009 he appeared on Swedish television in the show contests Mästarnas mästare, and in 2016 participated in Let's Dance 2016 which was broadcast on TV4. In the 2010s he oversaw the preparation of ski tracks for Åsarna IK, organized bird hunting events for tourists and worked as a forester.

== Cross-country skiing results ==
All results are sourced from the International Ski Federation (FIS).

=== Olympic Games ===
- 4 medals – (4 gold)

| Year | Age | 15 km | 30 km | 50 km | 4 × 10 km relay |
|---|---|---|---|---|---|
| 1976 | 19 | 15 | — | — | 4 |
| 1980 | 23 | Gold | 4 | — | 5 |
| 1984 | 27 | — | 14 | Gold | Gold |
| 1988 | 31 | — | 42 | DNF | Gold |

=== World Championships ===
- 7 medals – (3 gold, 3 silver, 1 bronze)

| Year | Age | 15 km | 30 km | 50 km | 4 × 10 km relay |
|---|---|---|---|---|---|
| 1982 | 25 | 18 | 16 | Gold | 5 |
| 1985 | 28 | Silver | 4 | 26 | Bronze |
| 1987 | 30 | Silver | Gold | Silver | Gold |

=== World Cup ===
==== Season standings ====
| Season | Age | Overall |
|---|---|---|
| 1982 | 25 | 2nd place, silver medalist(s) |
| 1983 | 26 | 5 |
| 1984 | 27 | 2nd place, silver medalist(s) |
| 1985 | 28 | 3rd place, bronze medalist(s) |
| 1986 | 29 | 15 |
| 1987 | 30 | 2nd place, silver medalist(s) |
| 1988 | 31 | 19 |

==== Individual podiums ====
- 6 victories
- 18 podiums

| No. | Season | Date | Location | Race | Level | Place |
|---|---|---|---|---|---|---|
| 1 | 1981–82 | 9 January 1982 | Reit im Winkl, West Germany | 15 km Individual | World Cup | 3rd |
| 2 | 1981–82 | 16 January 1982 | Le Brassus, Switzerland | 15 km Individual | World Cup | 2nd |
| 3 | 1981–82 | 27 February 1982 | Oslo, Norway | 50 km Individual | World Championships^{[1]} | 1st |
| 4 | 1981–82 | 12 March 1982 | Falun, Sweden | 30 km Individual | World Cup | 3rd |
| 5 | 1981–82 | 19 March 1982 | (Czechoslovak Socialist Republic) Štrbské Pleso, Czechoslovakia | 15 km Individual | World Cup | 2nd |
| 6 | 1982–83 | 26 February 1983 | Falun, Sweden | 30 km Individual | World Cup | 2nd |
| 7 | 1982–83 | 27 March 1983 | Labrador City, Canada | 30 km Individual | World Cup | 3rd |
| 8 | 1983–84 | 19 February 1984 | (Socialist Federal Republic of Yugoslavia) Sarajevo, Yugoslavia | 50 km Individual | Olympic Games^{[1]} | 1st |
| 9 | 1983–84 | 25 February 1984 | Falun, Sweden | 30 km Individual | World Cup | 2nd |
| 10 | 1983–84 | 2 March 1984 | Lahti, Finland | 15 km Individual | World Cup | 2nd |
| 11 | 1984–85 | 22 January 1985 | Seefeld, Austria | 15 km Individual | World Championships^{[1]} | 2nd |
| 12 | 1984–85 | 9 March 1985 | Falun, Sweden | 30 km Individual | World Cup | 3rd |
| 13 | 1984–85 | 14 March 1985 | Oslo, Norway | 15 km Individual | World Cup | 1st |
| 14 | 1985–86 | 8 March 1986 | Falun, Sweden | 30 km Individual C | World Cup | 1st |
| 15 | 1986–87 | 12 February 1987 | Oberstdorf, West Germany | 30 km Individual C | World Championships^{[1]} | 1st |
| 16 | 1986–87 | 15 February 1987 | Oberstdorf, West Germany | 15 km Individual C | World Championships^{[1]} | 2nd |
| 17 | 1986–87 | 21 February 1987 | Oberstdorf, West Germany | 50 km Individual F | World Championships^{[1]} | 2nd |
| 18 | 1986–87 | 21 March 1987 | Oslo, Norway | 50 km Individual C | World Cup | 1st |

==== Team podiums ====
- 7 victories
- 10 podiums

| No. | Season | Date | Location | Race | Level | Place | Teammates |
|---|---|---|---|---|---|---|---|
| 1 | 1983–84 | 16 February 1984 | (Socialist Federal Republic of Yugoslavia) Sarajevo, Yugoslavia | 4 × 10 km Relay | Olympic Games^{[1]} | 1st | Kohlberg / Ottosson / Svan |
| 2 | 1983–84 | 26 February 1984 | Falun, Sweden | 4 × 10 km Relay | World Cup | 1st | Östlund / Ottosson / Svan |
| 3 | 1984–85 | 24 January 1985 | Seefeld, Austria | 4 × 10 km Relay | World Championships^{[1]} | 3rd | Östlund / Eriksson / Svan |
| 4 | 1984–85 | 10 March 1985 | Falun, Sweden | 4 × 10 km Relay | World Cup | 2nd | Östlund / Mogren / Svan |
| 5 | 1984–85 | 17 March 1985 | Oslo, Norway | 4 × 10 km Relay | World Cup | 1st | Eriksson / Danielsson / Svan |
| 6 | 1985–86 | 13 March 1986 | Oslo, Norway | 4 × 10 km Relay F | World Cup | 3rd | Majbäck / Håland / Danielsson |
| 7 | 1986–87 | 17 February 1987 | Oberstdorf, West Germany | 4 × 10 km Relay F | World Championships^{[1]} | 1st | Östlund / Svan / Mogren |
| 8 | 1986–87 | 8 March 1987 | Falun, Sweden | 4 × 10 km Relay C | World Cup | 1st | Östlund / Mogren / Majbäck |
| 9 | 1986–87 | 19 March 1987 | Oslo, Norway | 4 × 10 km Relay C | World Cup | 1st | Ottosson / Mogren / Eriksson |
| 10 | 1987–88 | 24 February 1988 | Calgary, Canada | 4 × 10 km Relay F | Olympic Games^{[1]} | 1st | Ottosson / Svan / Mogren |

Note: ^{1} Until the 1999 World Championships and the 1994 Winter Olympics, World Championship and Olympic races were included in the World Cup scoring system.

| Preceded by Malmö FF | Svenska Dagbladet Gold Medal; 1980 | Succeeded by Annichen Kringstad |
