= Lars Håland =

Swedish cross-country skier

Personal information
- Full name: Lars Emil Håland
- Nationality: Sweden
- Born: 28 July 1962 (age 63) Stockholm, Sweden

Sport
- Sport: Skiing
- Club: Svenska Skidspelen Falun

World Cup career
- Seasons: 11 – (1986–1987, 1989–1995, 1997–1998)
- Indiv. starts: 47
- Indiv. podiums: 5
- Indiv. wins: 1
- Team starts: 15
- Team podiums: 10
- Team wins: 3
- Overall titles: 0 – (6th in 1989)
- Discipline titles: 0
Medal record
Men's cross-country skiing
Representing Sweden
International nordic ski competitions
| Event | 1st | 2nd | 3rd |
|---|---|---|---|
| Olympic Games | 0 | 0 | 0 |
| World Championships | 1 | 0 | 1 |
| Total | 1 | 0 | 1 |
World Championships
| Gold medal – first place | 1989 Lahti | 4 × 10 km relay |
| Bronze medal – third place | 1989 Lahti | 15 km freestyle |
Junior World Championships
| Gold medal – first place | 1982 Murau | 3 × 10 km relay |

Lars Håland (born 28 July 1962) is a former Swedish cross-country skier who competed from 1986 to 1999. He won two medals at the 1989 FIS Nordic World Ski Championships, with a gold in the 4 × 10 km relay, and a bronze in the 15 km freestyle. Håland also earned his only World Cup victory at Falun, Sweden in 1989.

He competed for the club Svenska Skidspelen Falun throughout his career.

== Cross-country skiing results ==
All results are sourced from the International Ski Federation (FIS).

=== Olympic Games ===
| Year | Age | 10 km | Pursuit | 30 km | 50 km | 4 × 10 km relay |
|---|---|---|---|---|---|---|
| 1998 | 35 | — | — | DNS | — | — |

=== World Championships ===
- 2 medals – (1 gold, 1 bronze)

| Year | Age | 10 km | 15 km classical | 15 km freestyle | Pursuit | 30 km | 50 km | 4 × 10 km relay |
|---|---|---|---|---|---|---|---|---|
| 1989 | 26 | —N/a | 7 | Bronze | —N/a | — | 4 | Gold |
| 1991 | 28 | —N/a | — | 16 | —N/a | 20 | — | — |
| 1993 | 30 | 16 | —N/a | —N/a | 19 | — | 13 | 6 |

=== World Cup ===
==== Season standings ====
| Season | Age | | | |
| Season | Age | Overall | Long Distance | Sprint |
|---|---|---|---|---|
| 1986 | 23 | 30 | —N/a | —N/a |
| 1987 | 24 | 35 | —N/a | —N/a |
| 1989 | 26 | 6 | —N/a | —N/a |
| 1990 | 27 | 10 | —N/a | —N/a |
| 1991 | 28 | 37 | —N/a | —N/a |
| 1992 | 29 | NC | —N/a | —N/a |
| 1993 | 30 | 31 | —N/a | —N/a |
| 1994 | 31 | 48 | —N/a | —N/a |
| 1995 | 32 | 68 | —N/a | —N/a |
| 1997 | 34 | 39 | 16 | — |
| 1998 | 35 | 36 | 40 | 33 |

==== Individual podiums ====
- 1 victory
- 3 podiums

| No. | Season | Date | Location | Race | Level | Place |
|---|---|---|---|---|---|---|
| 1 | 1988–89 | 26 February 1989 | Lahti, Finland | 15 km Individual F | World Championships^{[1]} | 3rd |
| 2 | 1988–89 | 11 March 1989 | Falun, Sweden | 30 km Individual F | World Cup | 1st |
| 3 | 1989–90 | 4 March 1990 | Lahti, Finland | 15 km + 15 km Pursuit C/F | World Cup | 3rd |

==== Team podiums ====
- 3 victories
- 10 podiums

| No. | Season | Date | Location | Race | Level | Place | Teammates |
|---|---|---|---|---|---|---|---|
| 1 | 1985–86 | 13 March 1986 | Oslo, Norway | 4 × 10 km Relay F | World Cup | 3rd | Wassberg / Majbäck / Danielsson |
| 2 | 1987–88 | 17 March 1986 | Oslo, Norway | 4 × 10 km Relay C | World Cup | 3rd | Eriksson / Forsberg / Kohlberg |
| 3 | 1988–89 | 24 February 1989 | Lahti, Finland | 4 × 10 km Relay C/F | World Championships^{[1]} | 1st | Majbäck / Svan / Mogren |
| 4 | 1988–89 | 5 March 1989 | Oslo, Norway | 4 × 10 km Relay F | World Cup | 1st | Eriksson / Majbäck / Mogren |
| 5 | 1988–89 | 12 March 1989 | Falun, Sweden | 4 × 10 km Relay C | World Cup | 2nd | Majbäck / Poromaa / Mogren |
| 6 | 1989–90 | 1 March 1990 | Lahti, Finland | 4 × 10 km Relay C/F | World Cup | 3rd | Forsberg / Ottosson / Mogren |
| 7 | 1989–90 | 16 March 1990 | Vang, Norway | 4 × 10 km Relay C | World Cup | 2nd | Mogren / Majbäck / Forsberg |
| 8 | 1992–93 | 5 March 1993 | Lahti, Finland | 4 × 10 km Relay C | World Cup | 1st | Majbäck / Jonsson / Mogren |
| 9 | 1993–94 | 13 March 1994 | Falun, Sweden | 4 × 10 km Relay F | World Cup | 3rd | Bergström / Forsberg / Mogren |
| 10 | 1994–95 | 5 February 1995 | Falun, Sweden | 4 × 10 km Relay F | World Cup | 3rd | Fredriksson / Bergström / Forsberg |

Note: ^{1} Until the 1999 World Championships, World Championship races were included in the World Cup scoring system.
