= Sven-Erik Danielsson =

Swedish cross-country skier

Personal information
- Nationality: Sweden
- Born: 10 February 1960 (age 66) Dala-Järna, Sweden

Sport
- Sport: Skiing
- Club: Dala-Järna IK

World Cup career
- Seasons: 14 – (1982–1987, 1989, 1991–1997)
- Indiv. starts: 32
- Indiv. podiums: 0
- Team starts: 4
- Team podiums: 2
- Team wins: 1
- Overall titles: 0 – (11th in 1985)
- Discipline titles: 0
Medal record
Men's cross-country skiing
Representing Sweden
Junior World Championships
Silver medal – second place	1979 Mont-Sainte-Anne	3 × 5 km relay

Sven-Erik Danielsson (born 10 February 1960) is a Swedish cross-country skier who competed from 1982 to 1998. His best World Cup finish was fourth in a 15 km event at West Germany in 1983.

Danielsson also finished 15th in the 15 kilometers event at the 1984 Winter Olympics in Sarajevo. In 1995, he won Vasaloppet.

== Cross-country skiing results ==
All results are sourced from the International Ski Federation (FIS).

=== Olympic Games ===
Year	Age	15 km	30 km	50 km	4 × 10 km relay
1980	20	18	—	—	—
1984	24	15	—	—	—

=== World Championships ===
Year	Age	15 km	30 km	50 km	4 × 10 km relay
1982	22	—	—	—	5

=== World Cup ===
==== Season standings ====
Season	Age	Overall	Long Distance	Sprint
1982	22	47	—N/a	—N/a
1983	23	21	—N/a	—N/a
1984	24	34	—N/a	—N/a
1985	25	11	—N/a	—N/a
1986	26	37	—N/a	—N/a
1987	27	35	—N/a	—N/a
1989	29	53	—N/a	—N/a
1991	31	NC	—N/a	—N/a
1992	32	NC	—N/a	—N/a
1993	33	44	—N/a	—N/a
1994	34	68	—N/a	—N/a
1995	35	44	—N/a	—N/a
1996	36	NC	—N/a	—N/a
1997	37	NC	NC	—

==== Team podiums ====
- 1 victory
- 2 podiums

No.	Season	Date	Location	Race	Level	Place	Teammates
1	1984–85	17 March 1985	Oslo, Norway	4 × 10 km Relay	World Cup	1st	Eriksson / Wassberg / Svan
2	1985–86	13 March 1986	Oslo, Norway	4 × 10 km Relay F	World Cup	3rd	Wassberg / Majbäck / Håland
