= Gunde Svan =

Swedish cross-country skier

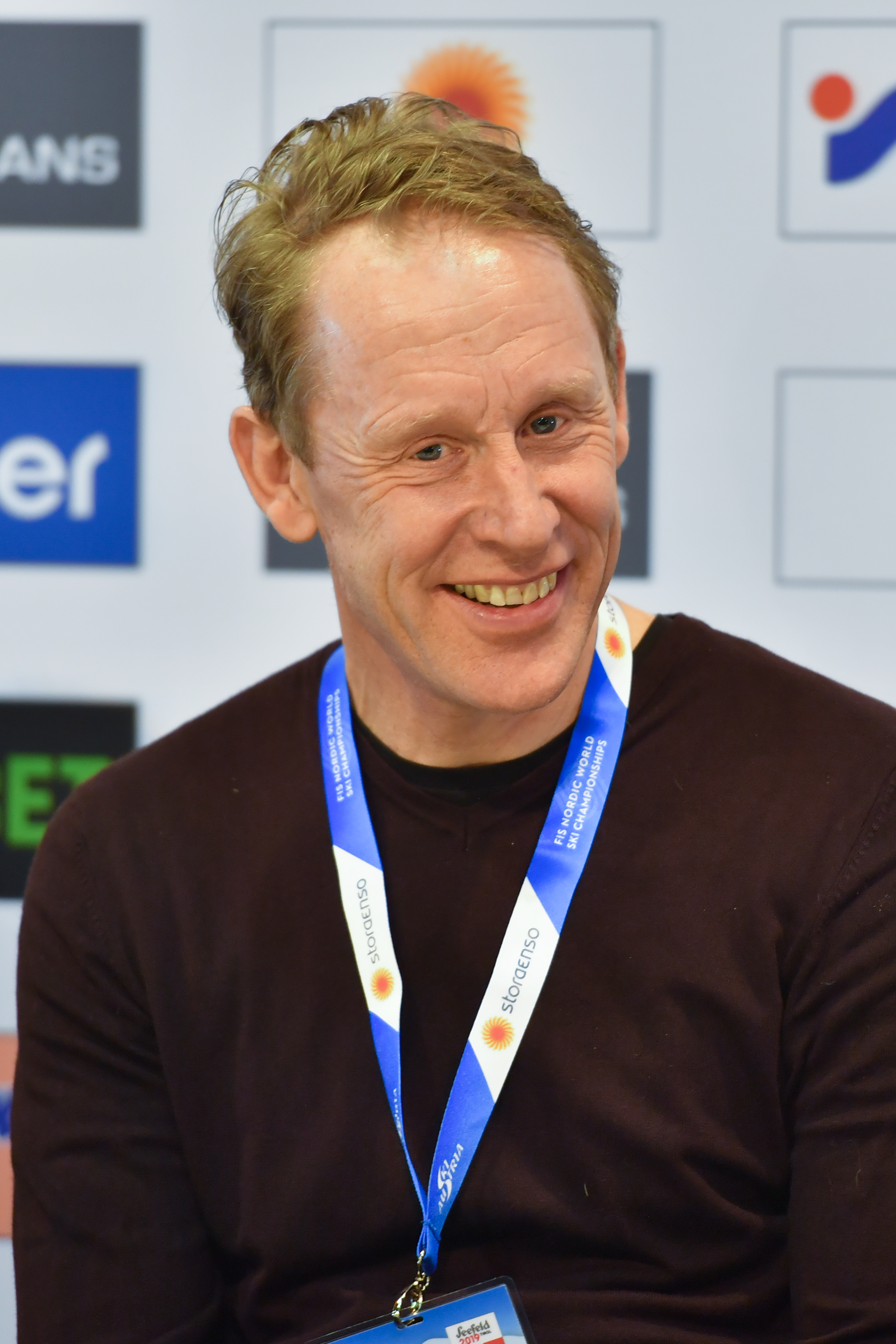
- Gunde Svan in 2019

Personal information
- Full name: Gunde Anders Svan
- Nationality: Sweden
- Born: 12 January 1962 (age 64) Dala-Järna, Sweden
- Height: 188 cm (6 ft 2 in)
- Spouse: Marie Svan

Sport
- Sport: Skiing
- Club: Dala-Järna IK

World Cup career
- Seasons: 10 – (1982–1991)
- Indiv. starts: 71
- Indiv. podiums: 46
- Indiv. wins: 30
- Team starts: 14
- Team podiums: 14
- Team wins: 9
- Overall titles: 5 – (1984–1986, 1988, 1989)
Medal record
Men's cross-country skiing
Representing Sweden
International nordic ski competitions
Event	1st	2nd	3rd
Olympic Games	4	1	1
World Championships	7	3	1
Total	11	4	2
Olympic Games
Gold medal – first place	1984 Sarajevo	15 km
Gold medal – first place	1984 Sarajevo	4 × 10 km relay
Gold medal – first place	1988 Calgary	50 km freestyle
Gold medal – first place	1988 Calgary	4 × 10 km relay
Silver medal – second place	1984 Sarajevo	50 km
Bronze medal – third place	1984 Sarajevo	30 km
World Championships
Gold medal – first place	1985 Seefeld	30 km
Gold medal – first place	1985 Seefeld	50 km
Gold medal – first place	1987 Oberstdorf	4 × 10 km relay
Gold medal – first place	1989 Lahti	15 km freestyle
Gold medal – first place	1989 Lahti	50 km freestyle
Gold medal – first place	1989 Lahti	4 × 10 km relay
Gold medal – first place	1991 Val di Fiemme	30 km classical
Silver medal – second place	1991 Val di Fiemme	15 km freestyle
Silver medal – second place	1991 Val di Fiemme	50 km freestyle
Silver medal – second place	1991 Val di Fiemme	4 × 10 km relay
Bronze medal – third place	1985 Seefeld	4 × 10 km relay
Junior World Championships
Gold medal – first place	1982 Murau	3 × 5 km relay
Silver medal – second place	1980 Örnsköldsvik	3 × 5 km relay
Silver medal – second place	1981 Schonach	3 × 5 km relay
Bronze medal – third place	1981 Schonach	15 km

Gunde Anders Svan (born 12 January 1962) is a Swedish former cross-country skier and auto racing driver. During his cross-country skiing career he won a total of four gold, one silver and one bronze medals at the Winter Olympics. Svan won a total of seven golds, three silvers, and one bronze at the FIS Nordic World Ski Championships. Svan also won the 15 km once (1983) and the 50 km twice (1986, 1990) at the Holmenkollen ski festival. In 1984, he earned the Svenska Dagbladet Gold Medal, and in 1985, he earned the Holmenkollen medal (shared with Anette Bøe and Per Bergerud). Svan won the Jerring Award in both 1984 and 1985. He is a board member of the International Ski Federation.

== Biography ==
During his skiing career he became known for his dedication and attention to detail. For instance, he used a lighter alloy on the tips of his ski poles, saving four grams (0.14 oz). He won two golds (15 km and relay), one bronze (30 km) and one silver (50 km) at the 1984 Winter Olympics in Sarajevo. At the 1988 Winter Olympics in Calgary, he won two golds for 50 km and relay. He also won the World championship gold six times and won the World cup five times.

As a competitor in rallycross he got one gold medal in the Swedish Championship and a bronze medal in the FIA European Championship for Rallycross Drivers (1995: Division 1 – Group N category; with a Toyota Celica GT-Four). One of the reasons for getting into another sport was that some people called him a natural skier while he himself maintained that it's just a matter of will and dedication, according to his famous tagline "nothing is impossible". He applied the same methods to his driving as his skiing and even built his own reaction-tester to practice for the rallycross eminently important starts. When his compatriot and teamboss, the late Christer Bohlin, was not able to fulfill his promise to upgrade his Toyota team for 1996 into the top ERC category (Division 2 by then), Svan quit and gave up rallycross.

After retiring from his athletic career he has worked as the host for some game shows such as the Swedish versions of American Gladiators and Fort Boyard along the swedish national lotery Bingolotto. He has played a seductive lady in the short movie En handelsresandes nöd, directed by rock group Svenne Rubins and starring Claes Månsson, Björn Skifs and Gert Klötzke. He has also appeared in numerous commercials including a famous commercial where he impersonated fellow skier Thomas Wassberg.

Svan resigned from his position as Chief of Cross-Country for Sweden on the week of 4 May 2009 after he was involved in its reorganization.

He participated in Let's Dance 2018 broadcast on TV4 where he finished third together with Jeanette Carlsson.

He retired to his 1,000-hectare (2,500-acre) forest farm, where he worked with his son, Ferry Svan, and now supports his children's careers.

== Cross-country skiing results ==
All results are sourced from the International Ski Federation (FIS).

=== Olympic Games ===
- 6 medals – (4 gold, 1 silver, 1 bronze)

Year	Age	15 km	30 km	50 km	4 × 10 km relay
1984	22	Gold	Bronze	Silver	Gold
1988	26	14	10	Gold	Gold

=== World Championships ===
- 11 medals – (7 gold, 3 silver, 1 bronze)

Year	Age	10 km	15 km classical	15 km freestyle	30 km	50 km	4 × 10 km relay
1982	20	—N/a	13	—N/a	—	—	—
1985	23	—N/a	5	—N/a	Gold	Gold	Bronze
1987	25	—N/a	23	—N/a	7	—	Gold
1989	27	—N/a	6	Gold	—	Gold	Gold
1991	29	17	—N/a	Silver	Gold	Silver	Silver

=== World Cup ===
==== Season titles ====
- 5 titles – (5 overall)

Season	
Season	Discipline
1984	Overall
1985	Overall
1986	Overall
1988	Overall
1989	Overall

==== Season standings ====
Season	Age	Overall
1982	20	57
1983	21	2nd place, silver medalist(s)
1984	22	1st place, gold medalist(s)
1985	23	1st place, gold medalist(s)
1986	24	1st place, gold medalist(s)
1987	25	3rd place, bronze medalist(s)
1988	26	1st place, gold medalist(s)
1989	27	1st place, gold medalist(s)
1990	28	2nd place, silver medalist(s)
1991	29	8

==== Individual podiums ====
- 30 victories
- 46 podiums

No.	Season	Date	Location	Race	Level	Place
1	1982–83	12 March 1983	Oslo, Norway	50 km Individual	World Cup	3rd
2	1982–83	19 March 1983	Anchorage, United States	15 km Individual	World Cup	1st
3	1982–83	27 March 1983	Labrador City, Canada	30 km Individual	World Cup	1st
4	1983–84	16 December 1983	Ramsau, Austria	30 km Individual	World Cup	1st
5	1983–84	10 February 1984	(Socialist Federal Republic of Yugoslavia) Sarajevo, Yugoslavia	30 km Individual	Olympic Games^{[1]}	3rd
6	1983–84	13 February 1984	(Socialist Federal Republic of Yugoslavia) Sarajevo, Yugoslavia	15 km Individual	Olympic Games^{[1]}	1st
7	1983–84	19 February 1984	(Socialist Federal Republic of Yugoslavia) Sarajevo, Yugoslavia	50 km Individual	Olympic Games^{[1]}	2nd
8	1983–84	25 February 1984	Falun, Sweden	30 km Individual	World Cup	1st
9	1983–84	2 March 1984	Lahti, Finland	15 km Individual	World Cup	3rd
10	1983–84	10 March 1984	Oslo, Norway	50 km Individual	World Cup	3rd
11	1983–84	17 March 1984	Fairbanks, United States	15 km Individual	World Cup	1st
12	1984–85	9 December 1984	Cogne, Italy	15 km Individual	World Cup	3rd
13	1984–85	18 January 1985	Seefeld, Austria	30 km Individual	World Championships^{[1]}	1st
14	1984–85	27 January 1985	Seefeld, Austria	50 km Individual	World Championships^{[1]}	1st
15	1984–85	16 February 1985	Aleko, Bulgaria	15 km Individual	World Cup	1st
16	1984–85	23 February 1985	Syktyvkar, Soviet Union	15 km Individual	World Cup	1st
17	1984–85	9 March 1985	Falun, Sweden	30 km Individual	World Cup	1st
18	1984–85	14 March 1985	Oslo, Norway	15 km Individual	World Cup	2nd
19	1985–86	8 December 1985	Labrador City, Canada	15 km Individual C	World Cup	1st
20	1985–86	14 December 1985	Biwabik, United States	30 km Individual F	World Cup	1st
21	1985–86	11 January 1986	La Bresse, France	30 km Individual C	World Cup	1st
22	1985–86	15 January 1986	(Socialist Federal Republic of Yugoslavia) Bohinj, Yugoslavia	5 km Individual F	World Cup	2nd
23	1985–86	14 February 1986	Oberstdorf, West Germany	50 km Individual F	World Cup	1st
24	1985–86	23 February 1986	Kavgolovo, Soviet Union	15 km Individual C	World Cup	2nd
25	1985–86	2 March 1986	Lahti, Finland	15 km Individual F	World Cup	2nd
26	1985–86	14 March 1986	Oslo, Norway	50 km Individual C	World Cup	1st
27	1986–87	10 December 1986	Ramsau, Austria	15 km Individual F	World Cup	1st
28	1986–87	13 December 1986	Cogne, Italy	15 km Individual F	World Cup	1st
29	1987–88	12 December 1987	La Clusaz, France	15 km Individual F	World Cup	2nd
30	1987–88	15 December 1987	Kastelruth, Italy	30 km Individual F	World Cup	2nd
31	1987–88	19 December 1987	Davos, Switzerland	15 km Individual C	World Cup	1st
32	1987–88	27 February 1988	Calgary, Canada	50 km Individual F	Olympic Games^{[1]}	1st
33	1988–89	10 December 1988	Ramsau, Austria	15 km Individual F	World Cup	2nd
34	1988–89	14 December 1988	(Socialist Federal Republic of Yugoslavia) Bohinj, Yugoslavia	30 km Individual F	World Cup	1st
35	1988–89	17 December 1988	Val di Sole, Italy	15 km Individual F	World Cup	1st
36	1988–89	13 January 1989	(Czechoslovak Socialist Republic) Nové Město, Czechoslovakia	15 km Individual F	World Cup	1st
37	1988–89	15 January 1989	(Czechoslovak Socialist Republic) Nové Město, Czechoslovakia	30 km Individual C	World Cup	1st
38	1988–89	20 February 1989	Lahti, Finland	15 km Individual F	World Championships^{[1]}	1st
39	1988–89	26 February 1989	Lahti, Finland	50 km Individual F	World Championships^{[1]}	1st
40	1989–90	13 January 1990	Moscow, Soviet Union	30 km Individual F	World Cup	1st
41	1989–90	21 February 1990	Val di Fiemme, Italy	30 km Individual C	World Cup	1st
42	1989–90	6 March 1990	Trondheim, Norway	15 km Individual C	World Cup	2nd
43	1989–90	17 March 1990	Vang, Norway	50 km Individual F	World Cup	1st
44	1990–91	7 February 1991	Val di Fiemme, Italy	30 km Individual C	World Championships^{[1]}	1st
45	1990–91	9 February 1991	Val di Fiemme, Italy	15 km Individual F	World Championships^{[1]}	2nd
46	1990–91	17 February 1991	Val di Fiemme, Italy	50 km Individual F	World Championships^{[1]}	2nd

==== Team podiums ====
- 9 victories
- 14 podiums

No.	Season	Date	Location	Race	Level	Place	Teammates
1	1983–84	16 February 1984	(Socialist Federal Republic of Yugoslavia) Sarajevo, Yugoslavia	4 × 10 km Relay	Olympic Games^{[1]}	1st	Wassberg / Kohlberg / Ottosson
2	1983–84	25 February 1984	Falun, Sweden	4 × 10 km Relay	World Cup	1st	Östlund / Wassberg / Ottosson
3	1984–85	24 January 1985	Seefeld, Austria	4 × 10 km Relay	World Championships^{[1]}	3rd	Östlund / Wassberg / Eriksson
4	1984–85	10 March 1985	Falun, Sweden	4 × 10 km Relay	World Cup	2nd	Östlund / Wassberg / Mogren
5	1984–85	17 March 1985	Oslo, Norway	4 × 10 km Relay	World Cup	1st	Eriksson / Danielsson / Wassberg
6	1985–86	9 March 1986	Falun, Sweden	4 × 10 km Relay F	World Cup	1st	Östlund / Eriksson / Mogren
7	1985–86	13 March 1986	Oslo, Norway	4 × 10 km Relay F	World Cup	1st	Östlund / Eriksson / Mogren
8	1986–87	17 February 1987	Oberstdorf, West Germany	4 × 10 km Relay F	World Championships^{[1]}	1st	Östlund / Wassberg / Mogren
9	1987–88	24 February 1988	Calgary, Canada	4 × 10 km Relay F	Olympic Games^{[1]}	1st	Ottosson / Wassberg / Mogren
10	1987–88	13 March 1988	Falun, Sweden	4 × 10 km Relay F	World Cup	1st	Ottosson / Mogren / Majbäck
11	1987–88	17 March 1988	Oslo, Norway	4 × 10 km Relay C	World Cup	2nd	Ottosson / Mogren / Majbäck
12	1988–89	24 February 1989	Lahti, Finland	4 × 10 km Relay C/F	World Championships^{[1]}	1st	Majbäck / Håland / Mogren
13	1990–91	15 February 1991	Val di Fiemme, Italy	4 × 10 km Relay C/F	World Championships^{[1]}	2nd	Eriksson / Majbäck / Mogren
14	1990–91	1 March 1991	Lahti, Finland	4 × 10 km Relay C/F	World Cup	2nd	Eriksson / Mogren / Forsberg

Note: ^{1} Until the 1999 World Championships and the 1994 Winter Olympics, World Championship and Olympic races were included in the World Cup scoring system.

== Racing record ==
Preceded by Håkan Carlqvist	Svenska Dagbladet Gold Medal; 1984	Succeeded by Patrik Sjöberg
