= Kari Ristanen =

Finnish cross-country skier

Personal information
- Nationality: Finland
- Born: 27 July 1958 (age 67) Tampere, Finland

Sport
- Sport: Skiing
- Club: Tampereen Poliisi-Urheilijat

World Cup career
- Seasons: 9 – (1982–1990)
- Indiv. starts: 38
- Indiv. podiums: 3
- Indiv. wins: 0
- Team starts: 6
- Team podiums: 4
- Team wins: 0
- Overall titles: 0 – (10th in 1987, 1988)
Medal record
Men's cross-country skiing
Representing Finland
Olympic Games
Bronze medal – third place	1984 Sarajevo	4 × 10 km relay
World Championships
Silver medal – second place	1989 Lahti	4 × 10 km relay

Kari Ristanen (born 27 July 1958) is a Finnish cross-country skier who competed during the 1980s. He won a bronze medal in the 4 × 10 km relay at the 1984 Winter Olympics in Sarajevo.

Ristanen also won a silver in the 4 × 10 km relay at the 1989 FIS Nordic World Ski Championships in Lahti.

His best individual finish was second twice in the World Cup (1985, 1986).

== Cross-country skiing results ==
All results are sourced from the International Ski Federation (FIS).

=== Olympic Games ===
- 1 medal – (1 bronze)

Year	Age	15 km	30 km	50 km	4 × 10 km relay
1984	25	—	17	15	Bronze
1988	29	—	27	7	8

=== World Championships ===
- 1 medal – (1 silver)

Year	Age	10 km	15 km classical	15 km freestyle	30 km	50 km	4 × 10 km relay
1985	26	—N/a	—N/a	—	34	—	—
1987	28	—N/a	—	—N/a	10	5	6
1989	30	—N/a	—	11	—	16	Silver
1991	32	—	—N/a	41	—	37	—

=== World Cup ===
==== Season standings ====
Season	Age	Overall
1982	23	32
1983	24	21
1984	25	24
1985	26	43
1986	27	11
1987	28	10
1988	29	10
1989	30	22
1990	31	NC

==== Individual podiums ====
- 3 podiums

No.	Season	Date	Location	Race	Level	Place
1	1985–86	14 December 1985	Biwabik, United States	30 km Individual F	World Cup	2nd
2	1986–87	10 December 1986	Ramsau, Austria	15 km Individual F	World Cup	2nd
3	1987–88	12 March 1988	Falun, Sweden	30 km Individual F	World Cup	3rd

==== Team podiums ====
- 4 podiums – (4 RL)

No.	Season	Date	Location	Race	Level	Place	Teammates
1	1983–84	16 February 1984	(Socialist Federal Republic of Yugoslavia) Sarajevo, Yugoslavia	4 × 10 km Relay	Olympic Games^{[1]}	3rd	Mieto / Kirvesniemi / Karvonen
2	1985–86	9 March 1986	Falun, Sweden	4 × 10 km Relay F	World Cup	3rd	Hynninen / Karvonen / Kirvesniemi
3	1986–87	19 March 1987	Oslo, Norway	4 × 10 km Relay C	World Cup	2nd	Laukkanen / Kirvesniemi / Karvonen
4	1988–89	24 February 1989	Lahti, Finland	4 × 10 km Relay C/F	World Championships^{[1]}	2nd	Karvonen / Kirvesniemi / Räsänen

Note: ^{1} Until the 1999 World Championships and the 1994 Olympics, World Championship and Olympic races were included in the World Cup scoring system.
