= Erik Östlund =

Swedish cross-country skier

Personal information
- Full name: Erik Agne Östlund
- Nationality: Sweden
- Born: 23 September 1962 (age 63)
- Spouse: Marie-Helene Östlund (m. 1993)

Sport
- Sport: Skiing
- Club: Dala-Järna IK

World Cup career
- Seasons: 5 – (1983–1987)
- Indiv. starts: 18
- Indiv. podiums: 1
- Indiv. wins: 0
- Team starts: 7
- Team podiums: 7
- Team wins: 5
- Overall titles: 0 – (4th in 1986)
Medal record
Men's cross-country skiing
Representing Sweden
World Championships
Gold medal – first place	1987 Oberstdorf	4 × 10 km relay
Bronze medal – third place	1985 Seefeld	4 × 10 km relay
Junior World Championships
Gold medal – first place	1982 Murau	3 × 5 km relay
Silver medal – second place	1982 Murau	15 km

Erik Agne Östlund (born 23 September 1962) is a retired Swedish cross-country skier who competed from 1983 to 1987. He won two 4 × 10 km relay medals at the FIS Nordic World Ski Championships with one gold (1987) and one bronze (1985).

Östlund's best individual finish was third in a 30 km event in La Bresse (France) on 11 January 1986.

Östlund is married to cross-country skier Marie-Helene Östlund (née Westin).

== Cross-country skiing results ==
All results are sourced from the International Ski Federation (FIS).

=== World Championships ===
- 2 medals – (1 gold, 1 bronze)

Year	Age	15 km	30 km	50 km	4 × 10 km relay
1985	22	32	—	—	Bronze
1987	24	—	—	—	Gold

=== World Cup ===
==== Season standings ====
Season	Age	Overall
1983	20	53
1984	21	30
1985	22	14
1986	23	4
1987	24	46

==== Individual podiums ====
- 1 podium

No.	Season	Date	Location	Race	Level	Place
1	1985–86	11 January 1986	La Bresse, France	30 km Individual C	World Cup	3rd

==== Team podiums ====
- 5 victories
- 7 podiums

No.	Season	Date	Location	Race	Level	Place	Teammates
1	1983–84	26 February 1984	Falun, Sweden	4 × 10 km Relay	World Cup	1st	Wassberg / Ottosson / Svan
2	1984–85	24 January 1985	Seefeld, Austria	4 × 10 km Relay	World Championships^{[1]}	3rd	Wassberg / Eriksson / Svan
3	1984–85	10 March 1985	Falun, Sweden	4 × 10 km Relay	World Cup	2nd	Wassberg / Mogren / Svan
4	1985–86	9 March 1986	Falun, Sweden	4 × 10 km Relay F	World Cup	1st	Eriksson / Mogren / Svan
5	1985–86	13 March 1986	Oslo, Norway	4 × 10 km Relay F	World Cup	1st	Eriksson / Mogren / Svan
6	1986–87	17 February 1987	Oberstdorf, West Germany	4 × 10 km Relay F	World Championships^{[1]}	1st	Svan / Wassberg / Mogren
7	1986–87	8 March 1987	Falun, Sweden	4 × 10 km Relay C	World Cup	1st	Mogren / Wassberg / Majbäck

Note: ^{1} Until the 1999 World Championships, World Championship races were included in the World Cup scoring system.
