= Antje Harvey =

German cross-country skier and biathlete

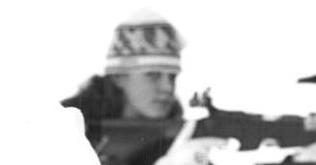
- Harvey in 1990

Medal record

Women's biathlon

Representing Germany

Olympic Games
Gold medal – first place	1992 Albertville	15 km individual
Silver medal – second place	1992 Albertville	7.5 km sprint
Silver medal – second place	1992 Albertville	3 × 7.5 km relay
Silver medal – second place	1994 Lillehammer	4 × 7.5 km relay

World Championships
Gold medal – first place	1995; Antholz-Anterselva	4 × 7.5 km relay
Bronze medal – third place	1991 Lahti	3 × 7.5 km relay

Women's cross-country skiing

Representing East Germany

World Championships
Bronze medal – third place	1985 Seefeld	4 × 5 km relay

Junior World Championships
Bronze medal – third place	1984 Trondheim	3 × 5 km relay
Bronze medal – third place	1985 Täsch	3 × 5 km relay

Antje Harvey (nee Misersky; born 10 May 1967 in Magdeburg) is a former German cross-country skier and biathlete.

She began her career as cross country skier and was a member of the East German team that won the 4 × 5 km bronze medal at the 1985 FIS Nordic World Ski Championships in Seefeld. When her father, Henner Misersky, who worked as a trainer of the East German team until 1985, refused to give steroid substances to his daughter and other team members, he was fired. Antje Misersky was then put under pressure and had to end her career in the GDR.

In 1989, she started biathlon. At the 1992 Winter Olympics in Albertville, she won the gold medal in 15 km individual and two silvers in the 7.5 km sprint and in the 3 × 7.5 km. At the 1994 Winter Olympics at Lillehammer she won another relay silver medal (4 × 7.5 km). Harvey also won two medals in the relay at the World Championships (1995: gold, 1991: bronze).

In the spring of 1993, she married American biathlete Ian Harvey whom she had met 15 months earlier at the Biathlon World Cup in Ruhpolding, Germany. In 1995, she retired from competitive sports and moved to Utah where she lives with her daughters, Hazel (*1996) and Pearl (*2001). In 2000, she became an American citizen.

For her refusal to take part in the systematic doping in the GDR, Antje Harvey received the Heidi-Krieger-Medal in 1995, in Berlin. The Heidi-Krieger-Medal is a prize of the association Doping-Opfer-Hilfe from Germany.

== Cross-country skiing results ==
All results are sourced from the International Ski Federation (FIS).

=== World Championships ===
- 1 medal – (1 bronze)

Year	Age	5 km	10 km	20 km	4 × 5 km relay
1985	17	11	26	—	Bronze

=== World Cup ===
==== Season standings ====
Season	Age	Overall
1985	18	48

==== Team podiums ====
- 2 podiums

No.	Season	Date	Location	Race	Level	Place	Teammates
1	1984–85	11 January 1985	Seefeld, Austria	4 × 5 km Relay	World Championships^{[1]}	3rd	Drescher / Nestler / Noack
2	1984–85	17 March 1985	Oslo, Norway	4 × 5 km Relay	World Cup	3rd	Nestler / Opitz / Noack

Note: ^{1} Until the 1999 World Championships, World Championship races were included in the World Cup scoring system.
