= Gaby Nestler =

East German cross-country skier (born 1967)

Personal information
- Nationality: Germany
- Born: 16 February 1967 (age 59) Annaberg-Buchholz, East Germany

Sport
- Sport: Skiing

World Cup career
- Seasons: 4 – (1984–1987)
- Indiv. starts: 13
- Indiv. podiums: 2
- Indiv. wins: 1
- Team starts: 3
- Team podiums: 2
- Team wins: 0
- Overall titles: 0 – (6th in 1986)
Medal record
Women's cross-country skiing
Representing East Germany
World Championships
Bronze medal – third place	1985 Seefeld	4 × 5 km relay
Junior World Championships
Gold medal – first place	1986 Lake Placid	15 km
Bronze medal – third place	1985 Täsch	5 km
Bronze medal – third place	1985 Täsch	3 × 5 km relay

Gaby Nestler is a former East German cross-country skier who competed during the 1980s. She won a bronze medal in the 4 × 5 km relay at the 1985 FIS Nordic World Ski Championships in Seefeld and also finished 10th in the 20 km event at the 1987 FIS Nordic World Ski Championships in Oberstdorf.

Nestler earned one victory in a 10 km event in Les Saisies, France in 1986 which made her the youngest race winner in the World Cup history.

== Cross-country skiing results ==
All results are sourced from the International Ski Federation (FIS).

=== World Championships ===
- 1 medal – (1 bronze)

Year	Age	5 km	10 km	20 km	4 × 5 km relay
1985	18	—	16	—	Bronze
1987	20	—	—	10	4

=== World Cup ===
==== Season standings ====
Season	Age	Overall
1984	17	49
1985	18	24
1986	19	6
1987	20	26

==== Individual podiums ====
- 1 victory
- 2 podiums

No.	Season	Date	Location	Race	Level	Place
1	1985–86	11 January 1986	Les Saisies, France	10 km Individual F	World Cup	1st
2	1985–86	18 January 1986	Nové Město, Czechoslovakia	20 km Individual F	World Cup	2nd

==== Team podiums ====
- 2 podiums

No.	Season	Date	Location	Race	Level	Place	Teammates
1	1984–85	11 January 1985	Seefeld, Austria	4 × 5 km Relay	World Championships^{[1]}	3rd	Drescher / Misersky / Noack
2	1984–85	17 March 1985	Oslo, Norway	4 × 5 km Relay	World Cup	3rd	Misersky / Opitz / Noack

Note: ^{1} Until the 1999 World Championships and the 1994 Olympics, World Championship and Olympic races were included in the World Cup scoring system.
