= Manuela Oschmann =

German cross-country skier (born 1965)

Personal information
- Nationality: Germany
- Born: 27 December 1961 (age 64) Zella-Mehlis, East Germany

Sport
- Sport: Skiing
- Club: SC Motor Zella-Mehlis

World Cup career
- Seasons: 1 – (1992)
- Indiv. starts: 3
- Indiv. podiums: 0
- Team starts: 1
- Team podiums: 1
- Team wins: 0
- Overall titles: 0 – (47th in 1992)
Medal record
Women's cross-country skiing
Representing East Germany
World Championships
Bronze medal – third place	1985 Seefeld	4 × 5 km relay
Junior World Championships
Bronze medal – third place	1984 Trondheim	3 × 5 km relay
Bronze medal – third place	1985 Täsch	3 × 5 km relay

Manuela Oschmann (née Drescher; born 9 June 1965) is a former German cross-country skier who competed during the 1980s. She won a bronze medal in the 4 × 5 km relay at the 1985 FIS Nordic World Ski Championships in Seefeld, Austria. She also competed in three events at the 1992 Winter Olympics.

== Cross-country skiing results ==
All results are sourced from the International Ski Federation (FIS).

=== Olympic Games ===
Year	Age	5 km	15 km	Pursuit	30 km	4 × 5 km relay
1992	30	42	15	38	—	—

=== World Championships ===
- 1 medal – (1 bronze)

Year	Age	5 km	10 km	20 km	4 × 5 km relay
1985	23	—	29	—	Bronze

=== World Cup ===
==== Season standings ====
Season	Age	Overall
1992	30	47

==== Team podiums ====
- 1 podium

No.	Season	Date	Location	Race	Level	Place	Teammates
1	1984–85	11 January 1985	Seefeld, Austria	4 × 5 km Relay	World Championships^{[1]}	3rd	Nestler / Misersky / Noack

Note: ^{1} Until the 1999 World Championships, World Championship races were included in the World Cup scoring system.
