= Mikhail Devyatyarov =

Soviet cross-country skier

Personal information
- Nationality: Russia
- Born: 25 February 1959 (age 67) Chusovoy, Soviet Union

Sport
- Sport: Skiing

World Cup career
- Seasons: 9 – (1982–1984, 1986–1990, 1992)
- Indiv. starts: 22
- Indiv. podiums: 4
- Indiv. wins: 2
- Team starts: 3
- Team podiums: 2
- Team wins: 0
- Overall titles: 0 – (13th in 1988)
Medal record
Men's cross-country skiing
Representing Soviet Union
Olympic Games
Gold medal – first place	1988 Calgary	15 km classical
Silver medal – second place	1988 Calgary	4 × 10 km relay
World Championships
Silver medal – second place	1987 Oberstdorf	4 × 10 km relay
Bronze medal – third place	1987 Oberstdorf	15 km classical

Mikhail Talgatovich Devyatyarov (Russian: Михаи́л Талга́тович Девятья́ров; born 25 February 1959 in Chusovoy) is a former Soviet/Russian cross-country skier who competed from 1982 to 1992, training at Armed Forces sports society in Perm. He took the gold medal in the 15 km classical and the silver medal in the 4 × 10 km relay at the 1988 Winter Olympics in Calgary.

Devyatyarov also won two medals at the 1987 FIS Nordic World Ski Championships with a silver in the 4 × 10 km relay and a bronze in the 15 km. He has taken two World cup victories.

Devyatyarov's son, Mikhail, Jr., is a retired cross-country skier who won his only World Cup race in the sprint event in Stockholm on 21 March 2007.

== Cross-country skiing results ==
All results are sourced from the International Ski Federation (FIS).

=== Olympic Games ===
- 2 medals – (1 gold, 1 silver)

Year	Age	15 km	30 km	50 km	4 × 10 km relay
1988	29	Gold	4	25	Silver

=== World Championships ===
- 2 medals – (1 silver, 1 bronze)

Year	Age	15 km classical	15 km freestyle	30 km	50 km	4 × 10 km relay
1987	28	Bronze	—N/a	17	—	Silver
1989	30	34	—	14	—	—

=== World Cup ===
Season standings
Season	Age	Overall
1982	23	65
1983	24	27
1984	25	17
1986	27	41
1987	28	17
1988	29	13
1989	30	53
1990	31	38
1992	33	NC

==== Individual podiums ====
- 2 victories
- 4 podiums

No.	Season	Date	Location	Race	Level	Place
1	1982–83	10 February 1983	(Socialist Federal Republic of Yugoslavia) Igman, Yugoslavia	15 km Individual	World Cup	3rd
2	1982–83	23 March 1984	Murmansk, Soviet Union	15 km Individual	World Cup	1st
3	1986–87	15 February 1987	Oberstdorf, West Germany	15 km Individual C	World Championships^{[1]}	3rd
4	1987–88	19 February 1988	Calgary, Canada	15 km Individual C	Olympic Games^{[1]}	1st

==== Team podiums ====
- 2 podiums

No.	Season	Date	Location	Race	Level	Place	Teammates
1	1986–87	17 February 1987	Oberstdorf, West Germany	4 × 10 km Relay F	World Championships (Note: Until the 1999 World Championships and the 1994 Olympics, World Championship and Olympic races were included in the World Cup scoring system.)	2nd	Batyuk / Smirnov / Sakhnov
2	1987–88	24 February 1988	Calgary, Canada	4 × 10 km Relay F	Olympic Games	2nd	Smirnov / Sakhnov / Prokurorov
