= Benny Kohlberg =

Swedish cross-country skier

Personal information
- Full name: Tord Benny Kolberg
- Nationality: Sweden
- Born: 17 April 1954 (age 72) Arvika, Sweden

Sport
- Sport: Skiing
- Club: Arvika IS

World Cup career
- Seasons: 3 – (1982, 1984, 1987)
- Indiv. starts: 8
- Indiv. podiums: 1
- Indiv. wins: 0
- Team starts: 3
- Team podiums: 2
- Team wins: 1
- Overall titles: 0 – (16th in 1982)
Medal record
Men's cross-country skiing
Representing Sweden
Olympic Games
Gold medal – first place	1984 Sarajevo	4 × 10 km relay

Benny Kohlberg (born 17 April 1954) is a retired Swedish cross-country skier who competed during the 1980s. He won a gold medal in the 4 × 10 km relay at the 1984 Winter Olympics in Sarajevo.

Kohlberg's best individual finish was third at a World Cup competition in 1982 in Switzerland.

== Cross-country skiing results ==
All results are sourced from the International Ski Federation (FIS).

=== Olympic Games ===
- 1 medal – (1 gold)

Year	Age	15 km	30 km	50 km	4 × 10 km relay
1980	25	17	13	—	5
1984	29	19	—	—	Gold

=== World Championships ===
Year	Age	15 km	30 km	50 km	4 × 10 km relay
1982	27	—	31	—	5

=== World Cup ===
==== Season standings ====
Season	Age	Overall
1982	27	16
1984	29	44
1987	32	33

==== Individual podiums ====
- 1 podium

No.	Season	Date	Location	Race	Level	Place
1	1981–82	16 January 1982	Le Brassus, Switzerland	15 km Individual	World Cup	3rd

==== Team podiums ====
- 1 victory
- 2 podiums

No.	Season	Date	Location	Race	Level	Place	Teammates
1	1983–84	16 February 1984	(Socialist Federal Republic of Yugoslavia) Sarajevo, Yugoslavia	4 × 10 km Relay	Olympic Games^{[1]}	1st	Wassberg / Ottosson / Svan
2	1987–88	17 March 1988	Oslo, Norway	4 × 10 km Relay C	World Cup	3rd	Eriksson / Forsberg / Håland

Note: ^{1} Until the 1994 Winter Olympics, Olympic races were included in the World Cup scoring system.
