= Jyrki Ponsiluoma =

Finnish-born Swedish cross-country skier

Personal information
- Full name: Jyrki Tapani Ponsiluoma
- Nationality: Sweden
- Born: 5 December 1966 (age 59) Kurikka, Finland

Sport
- Sport: Skiing

World Cup career
- Seasons: 4 – (1989, 1992–1993, 1995)
- Indiv. starts: 10
- Indiv. podiums: 0
- Team starts: 2
- Team podiums: 1
- Team wins: 0
- Overall titles: 0 – (27th in 1989)
- Updated on 4 April 2019

Jyrki Tapani Ponsiluoma (born 5 December 1966) is a Swedish cross-country skier, born in Kurikka, Finland, who competed from 1989 to 1995. He finished eighth in the 30 km event at the 1992 Winter Olympics in Albertville.

== Career ==
Ponsiluoma's best World Cup career finish was fifth in a 15 km event in the Soviet Union in 1989 which was also his best individual career finish.

== Cross-country skiing results ==
All results are sourced from the International Ski Federation (FIS).

=== Olympic Games ===
Year	Age	10 km	Pursuit	30 km	50 km	4 × 10 km relay
1992	25	—	—	8	—	—

=== World Cup ===
==== Season standings ====
Season	Age	Overall
1989	22	27
1992	25	36
1993	26	NC
1995	28	NC

==== Team podiums ====
- 1 podium

No.	Season	Date	Location	Race	Level	Place	Teammates
1	1991–92	8 March 1992	Funäsdalen, Sweden	4 × 10 km Relay C	World Cup	3rd	Ottosson / Mogren / Forsberg

== Personal life ==
He lives in Östersund with his family. His son Martin is a biathlete representing Sweden at international level.
