= Ute Noack =

East German cross-country skier (born 1961)

Personal information
- Nationality: Germany
- Born: 27 December 1961 (age 64) Annaberg-Buchholz, East Germany

Sport
- Sport: Skiing

World Cup career
- Seasons: 3 – (1983–1985)
- Indiv. starts: 19
- Indiv. podiums: 0
- Team starts: 3
- Team podiums: 2
- Team wins: 0
- Overall titles: 0 – (6th in 1985)
Medal record
Women's cross-country skiing
Representing East Germany
World Championships
Bronze medal – third place	1985 Seefeld	4 × 5 km relay

Ute Noack (born 27 December 1961) is a former East German cross-country skier who competed during the 1980s.

Noack was born in Annaberg-Buchholz, Bezirk Karl-Marx-Stadt. She won a bronze medal in the 4 × 5 km relay at the 1985 FIS Nordic World Ski Championships in Seefeld and also finished 11th in the 20 km event at those same championships.

Noack's best finish at the Winter Olympics was eight in the 5 km event at Sarajevo in 1984. Her best individual career finish was fourth twice in 1985.

== Cross-country skiing results ==
All results are sourced from the International Ski Federation (FIS).

=== Olympic Games ===
Year	Age	5 km	10 km	20 km	4 × 5 km relay
1984	22	8	15	18	8

=== World Championships ===
- 1 medal – (1 bronze)

Year	Age	5 km	10 km	20 km	4 × 5 km relay
1985	23	15	17	11	Bronze

=== World Cup ===
==== Season standings ====
Season	Age	Overall
1983	22	23
1984	23	18
1985	24	6

==== Team podiums ====
- 2 podiums

No.	Season	Date	Location	Race	Level	Place	Teammates
1	1984–85	11 January 1985	Seefeld, Austria	4 × 5 km Relay	World Championships^{[1]}	3rd	Drescher / Nestler / Misersky
2	1984–85	17 March 1985	Oslo, Norway	4 × 5 km Relay	World Cup	3rd	Misersky / Nestler / Opitz

Note: ^{1} Until the 1999 World Championships, World Championship races were included in the World Cup scoring system.
