= 1988–89 FIS Cross-Country World Cup =

Cross-country skiing competition

Discipline	Men	Women
Overall	(Sweden) Gunde Svan (5th title)	(Soviet Union) Yelena Välbe
Nations Cup	Sweden	Soviet Union
- Nations Cup Overall: Soviet Union

Competition
Locations	8 venues	8 venues
Individual	12 events	12 events
Relay/Team	5 events	5 events

The 1988–89 FIS Cross-Country World Cup was the 8th official World Cup season in cross-country skiing for men and women. The Women's World Cup started in La Clusaz, France, on 10 December 1988 and finished in Falun, Sweden, on 12 March 1989. The Men's World Cup started in Ramsau, Austria on 10 December 1988 and finished in Falun, Sweden, on 12 March 1989. Gunde Svan of Sweden won the overall men's cup, his fifth title, and Yelena Välbe of the Soviet Union won the women's cup.

== Calendar ==
=== Men ===
C – Classic / F – Freestyle
No.	Date	Venue	Event	Winner	Second	Third	Ref.
1	10 December 1988	(Austria) Ramsau	15 km F	(Sweden) Torgny Mogren	(Sweden) Gunde Svan	(East Germany) Uwe Bellmann	
2	14 December 1988	(Socialist Federal Republic of Yugoslavia) Bohinj	30 km F	(Sweden) Gunde Svan	(Sweden) Torgny Mogren	(Norway) Pål Gunnar Mikkelsplass	
3	17 December 1988	(Italy) Val di Sole	15 km F/C	(Sweden) Gunde Svan	(Sweden) Torgny Mogren	(Norway) Pål Gunnar Mikkelsplass	
4	7 January 1989	(Soviet Union) Kavgolovo	15 km C	(Norway) Vegard Ulvang	(Norway) Pål Gunnar Mikkelsplass	(Soviet Union) Vladimir Smirnov	
5	13 January 1989	(Czechoslovakia) Nové Město	15 km F	(Sweden) Gunde Svan	(Norway) Pål Gunnar Mikkelsplass	(Norway) Vegard Ulvang	
6	15 January 1989	(Czechoslovakia) Nové Město	30 km C	(Sweden) Gunde Svan	(Norway) Pål Gunnar Mikkelsplass	(Norway) Vegard Ulvang	
FIS Nordic World Ski Championships 1989
7	18 February 1989	(Finland) Lahti	30 km C *	(Soviet Union) Vladimir Smirnov	(Norway) Vegard Ulvang	(Sweden) Christer Majbäck	
8	20 February 1989	(Finland) Lahti	15 km F *	(Sweden) Gunde Svan	(Sweden) Torgny Mogren	(Sweden) Lars Håland	
9	22 February 1989	(Finland) Lahti	15 km C *	(Finland) Harri Kirvesniemi	(Norway) Pål Gunnar Mikkelsplass	(Norway) Vegard Ulvang	
10	26 February 1989	(Finland) Lahti	50 km F *	(Sweden) Gunde Svan	(Sweden) Torgny Mogren	(Soviet Union) Alexey Prokourorov	
11	4 March 1989	(Norway) Holmenkollen	50 km C	(Norway) Vegard Ulvang	(East Germany) Holger Bauroth	(Sweden) Torgny Mogren	
12	11 March 1989	(Sweden) Falun	30 km F	(Sweden) Lars Håland	(Sweden) Torgny Mogren	(Norway) Vegard Ulvang	

=== Women ===
C – Classic / F – Freestyle
No.	Date	Venue	Event	Winner	Second	Third	Ref.
1	10 December 1988	(France) La Féclaz	5 km F	(Czechoslovakia) Alžbeta Havrančíková	(Soviet Union) Tamara Tikhonova	(Soviet Union) Yelena Välbe	
2	14 December 1988	(Switzerland) Campra	15 km F	(Soviet Union) Yelena Välbe	(Czechoslovakia) Alžbeta Havrančíková	(Soviet Union) Larisa Lazutina	
3	17 December 1988	(Switzerland) Davos	10 km C	(Soviet Union) Yuliya Shamshurina	(Finland) Pirkko Määttä	(Soviet Union) Yelena Välbe	
4	7 January 1989	(Soviet Union) Kavgolovo	15 km C	(Soviet Union) Yelena Välbe	(Soviet Union) Svetlana Nageykina	(Norway) Trude Dybendahl	
5	13 January 1989	(East Germany) Klingenthal	10 km C	(Norway) Marianne Dahlmo	(Italy) Manuela Di Centa	(Norway) Anne Jahren	
6	15 January 1989	(East Germany) Klingenthal	30 km F	(Czechoslovakia) Alžbeta Havrančíková	(East Germany) Gabriele Hess	(Norway) Marianne Dahlmo	
FIS Nordic World Ski Championships 1989
7	17 February 1989	(Finland) Lahti	10 km C *	(Finland) Marja-Liisa Kirvesniemi	(Finland) Pirkko Määttä	(Finland) Marjo Matikainen	
8	19 February 1989	(Finland) Lahti	10 km F *	(Soviet Union) Yelena Välbe	(Finland) Marjo Matikainen	(Soviet Union) Tamara Tikhonova	
9	21 February 1989	(Finland) Lahti	15 km C *	(Finland) Marjo Matikainen	(Finland) Marja-Liisa Kirvesniemi	(Finland) Pirkko Määttä	
10	25 February 1989	(Finland) Lahti	30 km F *	(Soviet Union) Yelena Välbe	(Soviet Union) Larisa Lazutina	(Finland) Marjo Matikainen	
11	4 March 1989	(Norway) Holmenkollen	10 km C + 10 km F Pursuit	(Finland) Marja-Liisa Kirvesniemi	(Soviet Union) Tamara Tikhonova	(Norway) Anne Jahren	
12	11 March 1989	(Sweden) Falun	15 km F	(Soviet Union) Yelena Välbe	(Soviet Union) Tamara Tikhonova	(Italy) Manuela Di Centa	

=== Men's team events ===
C – Classic / F – Freestyle
Date	Venue	Event	Winner	Second	Third	Ref.
11 December 1988	(Austria) Ramsau	4 × 10 km relay C	Sweden Jan Ottosson; Lars Håland; Torgny Mogren; Gunde Svan	Norway Terje Langli; Torgeir Bjørn; Vegard Ulvang; Pål Gunnar Mikkelsplass	Soviet Union Andrey Sergeev; Mikhail Devyatyarov; Alexei Prokourorov; Vladimir Smirnov	
8 January 1989	(Soviet Union) Kavgolovo	4 × 10 km relay F	Norway Terje Langli; Torgeir Bjørn; Pål Gunnar Mikkelsplass; Vegard Ulvang	Soviet Union Igor Badamshin; Vladimir Sakhnov; Vladimir Smirnov; Alexei Prokourorov	Sweden Lars-Erik Ramström; Jyrki Ponsiluoma; Dennis Andersson; Anders Bergström	
24 February 1989	(Finland) Lahti	4 × 10 km relay C/F	Sweden Christer Majbäck; Gunde Svan; Lars Håland; Torgny Mogren	Finland Aki Karvonen; Harri Kirvesniemi; Kari Ristanen; Jari Räsänen	Czechoslovakia Ladislav Svanda; Martin Petrásek; Radim Nyc; Vaclav Korunka	
5 March 1989	(Norway) Holmenkollen	4 × 10 km relay F	Sweden Thomas Eriksson; Christer Majbäck; Torgny Mogren; Lars Håland	Soviet Union Igor Badamshin; Vladimir Smirnov; Vladimir Sakhnov; Alexey Prokourorov	Norway Pål Gunnar Mikkelsplass; Bjørn Dæhlie; Vegard Ulvang; Terje Langli	
12 March 1989	(Sweden) Falun	4 × 10 km relay C	Soviet Union Igor Badamshin; Vladimir Sakhnov; Alexey Prokourorov; Vladimir Smirnov	Sweden Christer Majbäck; Larry Poromaa; Lars Håland; Torgny Mogren	Norway Terje Langli; Pål Gunnar Mikkelsplass; Vegard Ulvang; Bjørn Dæhlie	

=== Women's team events ===
C – Classic / F – Freestyle
Date	Venue	Event	Winner	Second	Third	Ref.
11 December 1988	(France) La Féclaz	4 × 5 km relay C	Soviet Union Vida Vencienė; Yuliya Shamshurina; Yelena Välbe; Tamara Tikhonova	Norway Marit Elveos; Elin Nilsen; Grete Ingeborg Nykkelmo; Inger Helene Nybråten	Finland Tiina Pönkä; Marjo Matikainen; Jaana Savolainen; Erja Kuivalainen	
18 December 1988	(Switzerland) Davos	4 × 5 km relay F	Soviet Union Larisa Lazutina; Yuliya Shamshurina; Tamara Tikhonova; Yelena Välbe	Sweden Magdalena Wallin; Marie-Helene Westin; Carina Görlin; Karin Svingstedt	East Germany Kerstin Moring; Susann Kuhfittig; Silke Braun; Silke Meyer	
8 January 1989	(Soviet Union) Kavgolovo	4 × 5 km relay F	Soviet Union I Svetlana Nageykina; Larisa Lazutina; Tamara Tikhonova; Yelena Välbe	Norway Marianne Dahlmo; Marit Wold; Nina Skeime; Trude Dybendahl	Soviet Union III Natalia Chernych; Elena Kaschirskaja; Svietlana Kamotskaya; Irina Tretiakova	
24 February 1989	(Finland) Lahti	4 × 5 km relay C/F	Finland Pirkko Määttä; Marja-Liisa Kirvesniemi; Jaana Savolainen; Marjo Matikainen	Soviet Union Yuliya Shamshurina; Raisa Smetanina; Tamara Tikhonova; Yelena Välbe	Norway Inger Helene Nybråten; Anne Jahren; Nina Skeime; Marianne Dahlmo	
12 March 1989	(Sweden) Falun	4 × 5 km relay C	Norway Marianne Dahlmo; Anne Jahren; Inger Helene Nybråten; Trude Dybendahl	Soviet Union Larisa Lazutina; Raisa Smetanina; Tamara Tikhonova; Yelena Välbe	Sweden Karin Svingstedt; Magdalena Wallin; Karin Lamberg-Skog; Anna-Lena Fritzon	

== Overall standings ==
=== Men's standings ===
Place	Skier	Country	Points
1.	Gunde Svan	(Sweden)	170
2.	Vegard Ulvang	(Norway)	154
3.	Torgny Mogren	(Sweden)	140
4.	Pål Gunnar Mikkelsplass	(Norway)	134
5.	Vladimir Smirnov	(Soviet Union)	74
6.	Lars Håland	(Sweden)	67
7.	Holger Bauroth	(East Germany)	57
8.	Christer Majbäck	(Sweden)	46
9.	Uwe Bellmann	(East Germany)	45
10.	Alexey Prokurorov	(Soviet Union)	43
10.	Terje Langli	(Norway)	43

=== Women's standings ===
Place	Skier	Country	Points
1.	Yelena Välbe	(Soviet Union)	167
2.	Alžbeta Havrančíková	(Czechoslovakia)	105
3.	Tamara Tikhonova	(Soviet Union)	93
4.	Manuela Di Centa	(Italy)	91
5.	Larisa Lazutina	(Soviet Union)	89
6.	Marja-Liisa Kirvesniemi	(Finland)	87
7.	Marianne Dahlmo	(Norway)	81
8.	Yuliya Stepanova	(Soviet Union)	75
9.	Pirkko Määttä	(Finland)	62
10.	Anne Jahren	(Norway)	60

== Medal table ==
Rank	Nation	Gold	Silver	Bronze	Total
1	Sweden (SWE)	9	6	3	18
2	Soviet Union (URS)	7	6	6	19
3	Finland (FIN)	5	5	3	13
4	Norway (NOR)	3	5	10	18
5	Czechoslovakia (TCH)	2	1	1	4
6	East Germany (GDR)	0	2	2	4
7	Italy (ITA)	0	1	1	2
Totals (7 entries)		26	26	26	78

== Achievements ==
First World Cup career victory

Men

- (Norway) Vegard Ulvang, 25, in his 6th season – the WC 4 (15 km C) in Kavgolovo; first podium was 1985–86 WC 4 (5 km F) in Bohinj
- (Sweden) Lars Håland, 26, in his 4th season – the WC 12 (30 km F) in Falun; first podium was 1988–89 WC 8 (15 km F) in Lahti

Women

- (Czechoslovakia) Alžbeta Havrančíková, 25, in her 6th season – the WC 1 (5 km F) in La Féclaz; also first podium
- (Soviet Union) Yelena Välbe, 20, in her 2nd season – the WC 2 (15 km F) in Campra; first podium was 1988–89 WC 1 (5 km F) in La Féclaz
- (Soviet Union) Yuliya Shamshurina, 26, in her 4th season – the WC 3 (10 km C) in Davos; also first podium

Victories in this World Cup (all-time number of victories as of 1988–89 season in parentheses)

Men

- Gunde Svan (SWE), 6 (26) first places
- Vegard Ulvang (NOR), 2 (2) first places
- Torgny Mogren (SWE), 1 (7) first place
- Vladimir Smirnov (URS), 1 (3) first place
- Harri Kirvesniemi (FIN), 1 (3) first place
- Lars Håland (SWE), 1 (1) first place

Women

- Yelena Välbe (URS), 5 (5) first places
- Marja-Liisa Kirvesniemi (FIN), 2 (10) first places
- Alžbeta Havrančíková (TCH), 2 (2) first places
- Marjo Matikainen (FIN), 1 (8) first place
- Marianne Dahlmo (NOR), 1 (4) first place
- Yuliya Shamshurina (URS), 1 (1) first place

== See also ==
- Johann Mühlegg
