= 1987–88 FIS Cross-Country World Cup =

Cross-country skiing competition

Discipline	Men	Women
Overall	(Sweden) Gunde Svan (4th title)	(Finland) Marjo Matikainen (3rd title)
Nations Cup	Sweden	Soviet Union
- Nations Cup Overall: Sweden

Competition
Locations	9 venues	8 venues
Individual	11 events	10 events
Relay/Team	6 events	6 events

The 1987–88 FIS Cross-Country World Cup was the 7th official World Cup season in cross-country skiing for men and women. The World Cup started in La Clusaz, France, on 12 December 1987 and finished in Rovaniemi, Finland, on 27 March 1988. Gunde Svan of Sweden won the overall men's cup, and Marjo Matikainen of Finland won the women's.

The first ever mass start event in the World Cup was arranged in Kastelruth, Italy on 15 December 1987. Swede Torgny Mogren won the men's 30 km race. The first women's mass start event was won by Finnish skier Marjo Matikainen at Holmenkollen, Norway on 17 March 1988.

== Calendar ==
=== Men ===
C – Classic / F – Freestyle
No.	Date	Venue	Event	Winner	Second	Third	Ref.
1	12 December 1987	(France) La Clusaz	15 km F	(Sweden) Torgny Mogren	(Sweden) Gunde Svan	(Norway) Pål Gunnar Mikkelsplass	
2	15 December 1987	(Italy) Kastelruth	30 km F Mass Start	(Sweden) Torgny Mogren	(Sweden) Gunde Svan	(Canada) Pierre Harvey	
3	19 December 1987	(Switzerland) Davos	15 km C	(Sweden) Gunde Svan	(Norway) Pål Gunnar Mikkelsplass	(Sweden) Jan Ottosson	
4	9 January 1988	(Soviet Union) Kavgolovo	30 km C	(Soviet Union) Vladimir Smirnov	(Soviet Union) Alexey Prokourorov	(Sweden) Christer Majbäck	
5	15 January 1988	(Czechoslovakia) Strbske Pleso	15 km F	(Sweden) Torgny Mogren	(East Germany) Holger Bauroth	(Switzerland) Giachem Guidon	
1988 Winter Olympics
6	15 February 1988	(Canada) Calgary	30 km C *	(Soviet Union) Alexey Prokourorov	(Soviet Union) Vladimir Smirnov	(Norway) Vegard Ulvang	
7	19 February 1988	(Canada) Calgary	15 km C *	(Soviet Union) Mikhail Devyatyarov	(Norway) Pål Gunnar Mikkelsplass	(Soviet Union) Vladimir Smirnov	
8	27 February 1988	(Canada) Calgary	50 km F *	(Sweden) Gunde Svan	(Italy) Maurilio De Zolt	(Switzerland) Andreas Grünenfelder	
9	12 March 1988	(Sweden) Falun	30 km F	(Canada) Pierre Harvey	(East Germany) Holger Bauroth	(Finland) Kari Ristanen	
10	19 March 1988	(Norway) Holmenkollen	50 km F	(Canada) Pierre Harvey	(Italy) Silvano Barco	(Italy) Maurilio De Zolt	
11	27 March 1988	(Finland) Rovaniemi	50 km C	(Norway) Pål Gunnar Mikkelsplass	(Norway) Oddvar Brå	(Finland) Harri Kirvesniemi	

=== Women ===
C – Classic / F – Freestyle
No.	Date	Venue	Event	Winner	Second	Third	Ref.
1	13 December 1987	(France) La Clusaz	5 km F	(Norway) Marianne Dahlmo	(Finland) Jaana Savolainen	(East Germany) Simone Greiner-Petter	
2	16 December 1987	(Socialist Federal Republic of Yugoslavia) Bohinj	10 km F	(Soviet Union) Tamara Tikhonova	(Soviet Union) Anfisa Reztsova	(Soviet Union) Antonina Ordina	
3	19 December 1987	(West Germany) Reit im Winkl	5 km F	(Finland) Marja-Liisa Kirvesniemi	(Soviet Union) Raisa Smetanina	(Sweden) Marie-Helene Westin	
4	9 January 1988	(Soviet Union) Kavgolovo	10 km C	(Norway) Inger Helene Nybråten	(Soviet Union) Vida Vencienė	(Soviet Union) Antonina Ordina	
5	15 January 1988	(Italy) Toblach	20 km F	(East Germany) Simone Greiner-Petter	(Sweden) Anna-Lena Fritzon	(Sweden) Marie-Helene Westin	
1988 Winter Olympics
6	14 February 1988	(Canada) Calgary	10 km C *	(Soviet Union) Vida Vencienė	(Soviet Union) Raissa Smetanina	(Finland) Marjo Matikainen	
7	17 February 1988	(Canada) Calgary	5 km C *	(Finland) Marjo Matikainen	(Soviet Union) Tamara Tikhonova	(Soviet Union) Vida Vencienė	
8	25 February 1988	(Canada) Calgary	20 km F *	(Soviet Union) Tamara Tikhonova	(Soviet Union) Anfisa Reztsova	(Soviet Union) Raisa Smetanina	
9	17 March 1988	(Norway) Holmenkollen	30 km F Mass Start	(Finland) Marjo Matikainen	(Finland) Marja-Liisa Kirvesniemi	(Norway) Marit Mikkelsplass	
10	27 March 1988	(Finland) Rovaniemi	10 km F	(Sweden) Marie-Helene Westin	(Sweden) Magdalena Wallin	(Soviet Union) Svetlana Nageykina	

=== Men's team events ===
Date	Venue	Event	Winner	Second	Third	Ref.
10 January 1988	(Soviet Union) Kavgolovo	4 × 10 km relay F	Soviet Union	Sweden	Norway	
16 January 1988	(Czechoslovakia) Štrbské Pleso	4 × 10 km relay C	Sweden Jan Ottosson; Lars Håland; Gunde Svan; Torgny Mogren	Austria Markus Gandler; Alois Stadlober; Andre Blatter; Alois Schwarz	Czechoslovakia Ladislav Švanda; Miloš Bečvář; Radim Nyč; Václav Korunka	
22 February 1988	(Canada) Calgary	4 × 10 km relay F *	Sweden Jan Ottosson; Thomas Wassberg; Gunde Svan; Torgny Mogren	Soviet Union Vladimir Smirnov; Vladimir Sakhnov; Mikhail Devyatyarov; Alexey Prokourorov	Czechoslovakia Radim Nyč; Václav Korunka; Pavel Benc; Ladislav Švanda	
13 March 1988	(Sweden) Falun	4 × 10 km relay F	Sweden Jan Ottosson; Gunde Svan; Torgny Mogren; Christer Majbäck	Norway Bjørn Dæhlie; Torgeir Bjørn; Pål Gunnar Mikkelsplass; Vegard Ulvang	Italy Marco Albarello; Giorgio Vanzetta; Maurilio De Zolt; Silvano Barco	
17 March 1988	(Norway) Holmenkollen	4 × 10 km relay F	Norway Arild Monsen; Pål Gunnar Mikkelsplass; Torgeir Bjørn; Vegard Ulvang	Sweden I Jan Ottosson; Torgny Mogren; Christer Majbäck; Gunde Svan	Sweden II Thomas Eriksson; Henrik Forsberg; Lars Håland; Benny Kohlberg	

=== Women's team events ===
Date	Venue	Event	Winner	Second	Third	Ref.
20 December 1987	(West Germany) Reit im Winkl	4 × 5 km relay C	Norway Trude Dybendahl; Anne Jahren; Inger Helene Nybråten; Marianne Dahlmo	Finland	Soviet Union	
10 January 1988	(Soviet Union) Leningrad	4 × 5 km relay C	Soviet Union	Norway	Sweden	
16 January 1988	(Italy) Toblach	4 × 5 km relay F	Sweden Karin Svingstedt; Anna-Lena Fritzon; Magdalena Wallin; Marie-Helene Westin	East Germany	Norway	
23 February 1988	(Canada) Calgary	4 × 5 km relay F *	Soviet Union Svetlana Nageykina; Nina Gavrylyuk; Tamara Tikhonova; Anfisa Reztsova	Norway Trude Dybendahl; Marit Wold; Anne Jahren; Marianne Dahlmo	Finland Pirkko Määttä; Marja-Liisa Kirvesniemi; Marjo Matikainen; Jaana Savolainen	-
13 March 1988	(Sweden) Falun	4 × 5 km relay C	Norway I Trude Dybendahl; Inger Helene Nybråten; Anne Jahren; Marianne Dahlmo	Finland Marja-Liisa Kirvesniemi; Marjo Matikainen; Eija Hyytiäinen; Pirkko Määttä	Norway II Marit Elveos; Marit Mikkelsplass; Anette Bøe; Solveig Pedersen	
26 March 1988	(Finland) Rovaniemi	Relay 4x5 km F	Finland I Erja Kuivalainen; Pirkko Määttä; Marja-Liisa Kirvesniemi; Marjo Matikainen	Finland II	Norway	

- NOTE: Races marked with a star (*) counts officially for both as "FIS World Cup" and "Olympic Winter Games" wins statistics.

== Overall standings ==
=== Men's standings ===
Place	Skier	Country	Points
1.	Gunde Svan	(Sweden)	109
2.	Torgny Mogren	(Sweden)	100
3.	Pål Gunnar Mikkelsplass	(Norway)	99
4.	Holger Bauroth	(East Germany)	81
4.	Vladimir Smirnov	(Soviet Union)	71
6.	Pierre Harvey	(Canada)	67
7.	Vegard Ulvang	(Norway)	64
8.	Jan Ottosson	(Sweden)	58
9.	Alexey Prokurorov	(Soviet Union)	57
10.	Kari Ristanen	(Finland)	50

=== Women's standings ===
Place	Skier	Country	Points
1.	Marjo Matikainen	(Finland)	107
2.	Marie-Helene Westin	(Sweden)	92
3.	Marja-Liisa Kirvesniemi	(Finland)	82
4.	Tamara Tikhonova	(Soviet Union)	81
5.	Vida Vencienė	(Soviet Union)	78
6.	Raisa Smetanina	(Soviet Union)	65
7	Marianne Dahlmo	(Norway)	62
8.	Simone Greiner-Petter	(East Germany)	59
9.	Inger Helene Nybråten	(Norway)	54
10.	Pirkko Määttä	(Finland)	52

== Medal table ==
Rank	Nation	Gold	Silver	Bronze	Total
1	Soviet Union (URS)	7	9	6	22
2	Sweden (SWE)	7	4	4	15
3	Norway (NOR)	3	4	3	10
4	Finland (FIN)	3	2	4	9
5	Canada (CAN)	2	0	1	3
6	East Germany (GDR)	1	2	1	4
7	Italy (ITA)	0	2	1	3
8	Switzerland (SUI)	0	0	2	2
9	Czechoslovakia (TCH)	0	0	1	1
Totals (9 entries)		23	23	23	69

== Achievements ==
First World Cup career victory

Men

None

Women

- (Soviet Union) Tamara Tikhonova, 23, in her 5th season – the WC 2 (10 km F) in Bohinj; also first podium
- (East Germany) Simone Greiner-Petter, 20, in her 2nd season – the WC 5 (20 km F) in Toblach; first podium was 1987–88 WC 1 (5 km F) in La Clusaz
- (Soviet Union) Vida Vencienė, 26, in her 3rd season – the WC 6 (10 km C) in Calgary; first podium was 1987–88 WC 4 (10 km C) in Leningrad

Victories in this World Cup (all-time number of victories as of 1987/88 season in parentheses)

Men

- Torgny Mogren (SWE), 3 (6) first places
- Gunde Svan (SWE), 2 (20) first places
- Pierre Harvey (CAN), 2 (3) first places
- Pål Gunnar Mikkelsplass (NOR), 1 (3) first place
- Vladimir Smirnov (USSR), 1 (2) first place
- Alexey Prokourorov (USSR), 1 (2) first place
- Mikhail Devyatyarov (USSR), 1 (2) first place

Women

- Marjo Matikainen (FIN), 2 (7) first places
- Tamara Tikhonova (USSR), 2 (2) first places
- Marja-Liisa Kirvesniemi (FIN), 1 (8) first places
- Marianne Dahlmo (NOR), 1 (3) first place
- Inger Helene Nybråten (NOR), 1 (2) first place
- Marie-Helene Westin (SWE), 1 (2) first place
- Simone Greiner-Petter (DDR), 1 (1) first place
- Vida Vencienė (USSR), 1 (1) first place
