= 1985–86 FIS Cross-Country World Cup =

Cross-country skiing competition

Discipline	Men	Women
Overall	(Sweden) Gunde Svan (3rd title)	(Finland) Marjo Matikainen
Nations Cup	Sweden	Norway
- Nations Cup Overall: Norway

Competition
Locations	9 venues	9 venues
Individual	9 events	9 events
Relay/Team	5 events	5 events

The 1985–86 FIS Cross-Country World Cup was the 5th official World Cup season in cross-country skiing for men and women. The World Cup began in Labrador City, Canada, on 7 December 1985 and finished in Oslo, Norway, on 15 March 1986. Gunde Svan of Sweden won the overall men's cup, and Marjo Matikainen of Finland won the women's.

Before the season began, after several years of disagreements between athletes and federations concerning what styles of skiing should be allowed, it was decided that cross-country skiing should have two disciplines: classical and freestyle. The initiative to this idea was made by the Swedish skier Thomas Wassberg.

== Race calendar ==
=== Men ===
C – Classic / F – Freestyle
No.	Date	Venue	Event	Winner	Second	Third	Ref.
1	8 December 1985	(Canada) Labrador City	15 km C	(Sweden) Gunde Svan	(Norway) Pål Gunnar Mikkelsplass	(Soviet Union) Vladimir Smirnov	
2	14 December 1985	(United States) Biwabik	30 km F	(Sweden) Gunde Svan	(Finland) Kari Ristanen	(Norway) Ove Aunli	
3	11 January 1986	(France) La Bresse	30 km C	(Sweden) Gunde Svan	(Soviet Union) Vladimir Smirnov	(Sweden) Erik Östlund	
4	15 January 1986	(Socialist Federal Republic of Yugoslavia) Bohinj	15 km F	(Sweden) Torgny Mogren	(Sweden) Gunde Svan	(Norway) Vegard Ulvang	
5	14 February 1986	(West Germany) Oberstdorf	50 km F	(Sweden) Gunde Svan	(Soviet Union) Vladimir Sakhnov	(Italy) Maurilio De Zolt	
6	23 February 1986	(Soviet Union) Kavgolovo	15 km C	(Soviet Union) Vladimir Smirnov	(Sweden) Gunde Svan	(Soviet Union) Yuriy Burlakov	
7	2 March 1986	(Finland) Lahti	15 km F	(Sweden) Torgny Mogren	(Sweden) Gunde Svan	(Italy) Giorgio Vanzetta	
8	8 March 1986	(Sweden) Falun	30 km C	(Sweden) Thomas Wassberg	(Sweden) Thomas Eriksson	(Norway) Martin Hole	
9	14 March 1986	(Norway) Oslo	50 km C	(Sweden) Gunde Svan	(Sweden) Torgny Mogren	(Norway) Vegard Ulvang	

=== Women ===
C – Classic / F – Freestyle
No.	Date	Venue	Event	Winner	Second	Third	Ref.
1	7 December 1985	(Canada) Labrador City	5 km F	(Finland) Marjo Matikainen	(Soviet Union) Anfisa Reztsova	(Finland) Jaana Savolainen	
2	13 December 1985	(United States) Biwabik	10 km C	(Norway) Brit Pettersen	(Norway) Marianne Dahlmo	(Finland) Marjo Matikainen	
3	11 January 1986	(France) Les Saisies	10 km F	(East Germany) Gaby Nestler	(East Germany) Carola Jacob	(East Germany) Simone Opitz	
4	18 January 1986	(Czechoslovakia) Nové Město	20 km F	(East Germany) Simone Opitz	(East Germany) Gaby Nestler	(Norway) Marianne Dahlmo	
5	15 February 1986	(West Germany) Oberstdorf	20 km C	(Norway) Marianne Dahlmo	(Norway) Brit Pettersen	(Soviet Union) Raisa Smetanina	
6	22 February 1986	(Soviet Union) Kavgolovo	10 km C	(Norway) Anne Jahren	(Norway) Marianne Dahlmo	(Soviet Union) Raisa Smetanina	
7	2 March 1986	(Finland) Lahti	5 km C	(Finland) Marjo Matikainen	(Norway) Anne Jahren	(Norway) Marianne Dahlmo	
8	8 March 1986	(Sweden) Falun	30 km C	(Norway) Brit Pettersen	(Finland) Marjo Matikainen	(Norway) Marit Mikkelsplass	
9	15 March 1986	(Norway) Oslo	10 km F	(Finland) Jaana Savolainen	(East Germany) Simone Opitz	(Norway) Anne Jahren	

=== Men's team events ===
C – Classic / F – Freestyle
Date	Venue	Event	Winner	Second	Third	Ref.
8 December 1985	(Canada) Labrador City	4 × 10 km relay C/F	Sweden I Erik Östlund; Jan Ottosson; Torgny Mogren; Gunde Svan	Soviet Union Leonid Turtchin; Oleksandr Batyuk; Vasily Gorbachyov; Vladimir Smirnov	Norway Tor Håkon Holte; Vegard Ulvang; Ove Aunli Pål Gunnar Mikkelsplass	
15 January 1986	(Socialist Federal Republic of Yugoslavia) Bohinj	4 × 10 km relay C	Sweden Erik Östlund; Torgny Mogren; Christer Majbäck; Gunde Svan	Soviet Union Oleksandr Batyuk; Mikhail Devyatyarov; Yuriy Burlakov; Vladimir Smirnov	Norway Hans Erik Tofte; Vegard Ulvang; Per Knut Aaland; Pål Gunnar Mikkelsplass	
16 February 1986	(West Germany) Oberstdorf	4 × 10 km relay C	Sweden I Erik Östlund; Torgny Mogren; Gunde Svan; Thomas Eriksson	Norway I Pål Gunnar Mikkelsplass; Vegard Ulvang; Martin Hole; Hans Erik Tofte	Soviet Union II Andrei Sergeyev; Oleksandr Ushkalenko; Yuriy Burlakov; Alexey Burlakov	
9 March 1986	(Sweden) Falun	4 × 10 km relay F	Sweden Erik Östlund; Thomas Eriksson; Torgny Mogren; Gunde Svan	Norway I Arild Monsen; Vegard Ulvang; Pål Gunnar Mikkelsplass; Martin Hole	Finland Ari Hynninen; Kari Ristanen; Aki Karvonen; Harri Kirvesniemi	
13 March 1986	(Norway) Oslo	4 × 10 km relay F	Sweden I Erik Östlund; Thomas Eriksson; Torgny Mogren; Gunde Svan	Italy Marco Albarello; Albert Walder; Maurilio De Zolt; Giorgio Vanzetta	Sweden II Thomas Wassberg; Christer Majbäck; Lars Håland; Sven-Erik Danielsson	

=== Women's team events ===
C – Classic / F – Freestyle
Date	Venue	Event	Winner	Second	Third	Ref.
15 December 1985	(United States) Biwabik	4 × 5 km relay F	Finland Pirkko Määttä; Jaana Savolainen; Eija Hyytiäinen; Marjo Matikainen	Soviet Union Tamara Tikhonova; Antonina Ordina; Nina Koroleva; Anfisa Reztsova	Norway I Brit Pettersen; Grete Ingeborg Nykkelmo; Anne Jahren; Marianne Dahlmo	
15 January 1986	(East Germany) Klingenthal	4 × 5 km relay F	East Germany I Carola Jacob; Susann Kuhfittig; Simone Opitz; Gaby Nestler	Finland Pirkko Määttä; Jaana Savolainen; Eija Hyytiäinen; Marjo Matikainen	Sweden Marie Johansson; Anna Larsson; Anna-Lena Fritzon; Karin Lamberg-Skog	
16 February 1986	(West Germany) Oberstdorf	4 × 5 km relay C	Norway I Marianne Dahlmo; Brit Pettersen; Solveig Pedersen; Anne Jahren	Finland Pirkko Määttä; Jaana Savolainen; Eija Hyytiäinen; Marjo Matikainen	Soviet Union Nina Gavrylyuk; Tamara Tikhonova; Natalia Furlatova; Nina Koroleva	
1 March 1986	(Finland) Lahti	4 × 5 km relay C	Norway I Berit Aunli; Brit Pettersen; Solveig Pedersen; Anne Jahren	Finland I Pirkko Määttä; Eija Hyytiäinen; Jaana Savolainen; Marjo Matikainen	Norway II Marianne Myklebust; Nina Skeime; Nina Østvold; Trude Dybendahl	
13 March 1986	(Norway) Oslo	4 × 5 km relay F	Sweden Lis Frost; Carina Görlin; Karin Lamberg-Skog; Annika Dahlman	Norway I Marianne Dahlmo; Nina Skeime; Berit Aunli; Anne Jahren	Norway II Inger Helene Nybråten; Grete Ingeborg Nykkelmo; Hilde Gjermundshaug Pedersen; Siv Tangen	

== Overall standings ==
=== Men ===
Place	Skier	Country	Points
1.	Gunde Svan	(Sweden)	145
2.	Torgny Mogren	(Sweden)	101
3.	Vladimir Smirnov	(Soviet Union)	78
4.	Pål Gunnar Mikkelsplass	(Norway)	57
4.	Erik Östlund	(Sweden)	57
6.	Thomas Eriksson	(Sweden)	50
7.	Christer Majbäck	(Sweden)	47
8.	Vegard Ulvang	(Norway)	43
9.	Pierre Harvey	(Canada)	40
10.	Martin Hole	(Norway)	29

=== Women ===
Place	Skier	Country	Points
1.	Marjo Matikainen	(Finland)	107
2.	Marianne Dahlmo	(Norway)	106
3.	Brit Pettersen	(Norway)	104
4.	Anne Jahren	(Norway)	88
5.	Simone Opitz	(East Germany)	60
6.	Gaby Nestler	(East Germany)	54
6.	Evi Kratzer	(Switzerland)	54
8.	Jaana Savolainen	(Finland)	44
9.	Nina Koroleva	(Soviet Union)	42
9.	Pirkko Määttä	(Finland)	42

== Medal table ==
Rank	Nation	Gold	Silver	Bronze	Total
1	Sweden (SWE)	8	5	1	14
2	Norway (NOR)	4	4	9	17
3	Finland (FIN)	3	2	2	7
4	East Germany (GDR)	2	3	1	6
5	Soviet Union (URS)	1	4	3	8
6	Italy (ITA)	0	0	2	2
Totals (6 entries)		18	18	18	54

== Achievements ==
First World Cup career victory

Men

- (Sweden) Torgny Mogren, 22, in his 3rd season - the WC 4 (5 km F) in Bohinj; also first podium
- (Soviet Union) Vladimir Smirnov, 21, in his 4th season - the WC 6 (15 km C) in Kavgolovo; first podium was 1983–84 WC 10 (15 km) in Murmansk

Women

- (Finland) Marjo Matikainen, 20, in her 2nd season – the WC 1 (5 km F) in Labrador City; also first podium
- (East Germany) Gaby Nestler, 18, in her 3rd season – the WC 3 (10 km F) in Les Saisies; also first podium
- (East Germany) Simone Opitz, 23, in her 2nd season – the WC 4 (20 km F) in Nove Mesto; first podium was 1985–86 WC 3 (10 km F) in Les Saisies
- (Norway) Marianne Dahlmo, 21, in her 2nd season – the WC 5 (20 km C) in Oberstdorf; first podium was 1984–85 WC 9 (5 km) in Lahti
- (Norway) Anne Jahren, 22, in her 5th season – the WC 6 (10 km C) in Kavgolovo; first podium was 1982–83 WC 3 (10 km) in Stachy Zadow
- (Finland) Jaana Savolainen, 23, in her 3rd season – the WC 9 (10 km F) in Oslo; first podium was 1985–86 WC 1 (5 km F) in Labrador City

Victories in this World Cup (all-time number of victories as of 1985/86 season in parentheses)

Men

- Gunde Svan (SWE), 5 (16) first places
- Torgny Mogren (SWE), 2 (2) first places
- Vladimir Smirnov (URS), 1 (1) first place
- Thomas Wassberg (SWE), 1 (4) first place

Women

- Brit Pettersen (NOR), 2 (8) first places
- Marjo Matikainen (FIN), 2 (2) first places
- Gaby Nestler (GDR), 1 (1) first place
- Simone Opitz (GDR), 1 (1) first place
- Marianne Dahlmo (NOR), 1 (1) first place
- Anne Jahren (NOR), 1 (1) first place
- Jaana Savolainen (FIN), 1 (1) first place
