= Lugnet, Falun =

Sport complex located in Falun, Sweden

Coordinates: 60°37′15″N 15°39′30″E

Lugnet
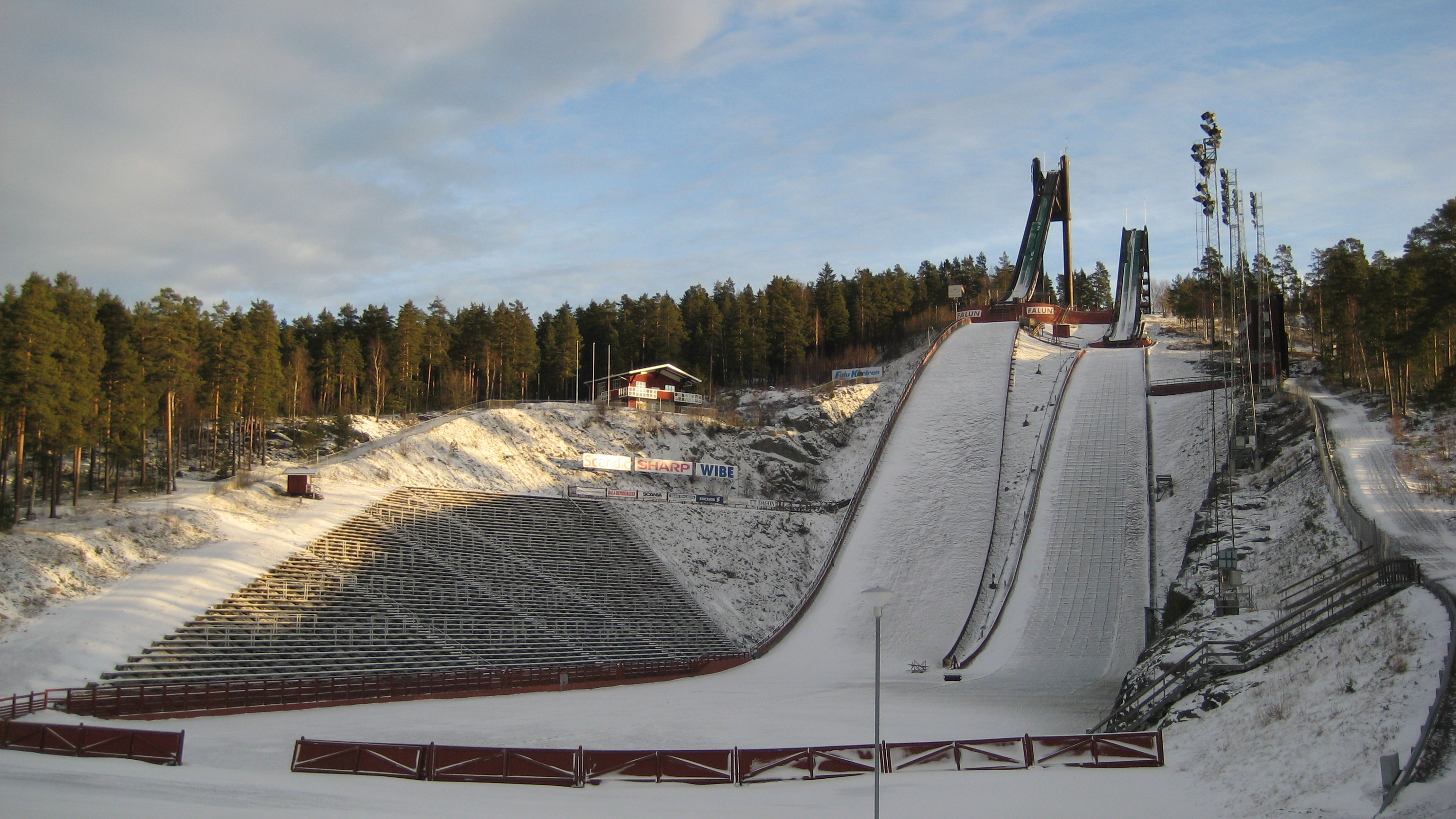
- Lugnet Hills in 2008
- Interactive map of Lugnet
- Location: Falun, Sweden
- Type: Sport complex

Construction
- Opened: 1973

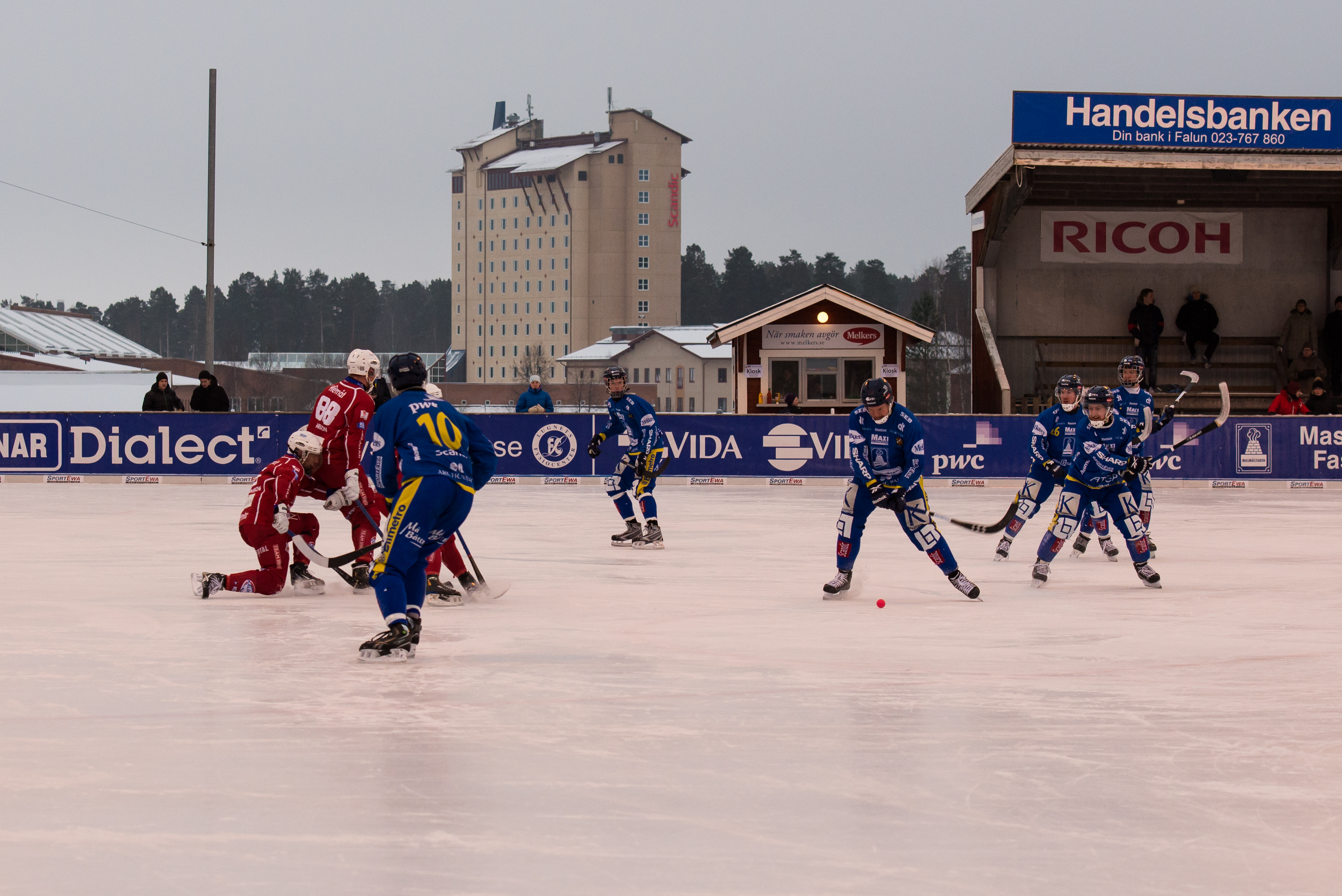
Falu BS playing bandy at Lugnet

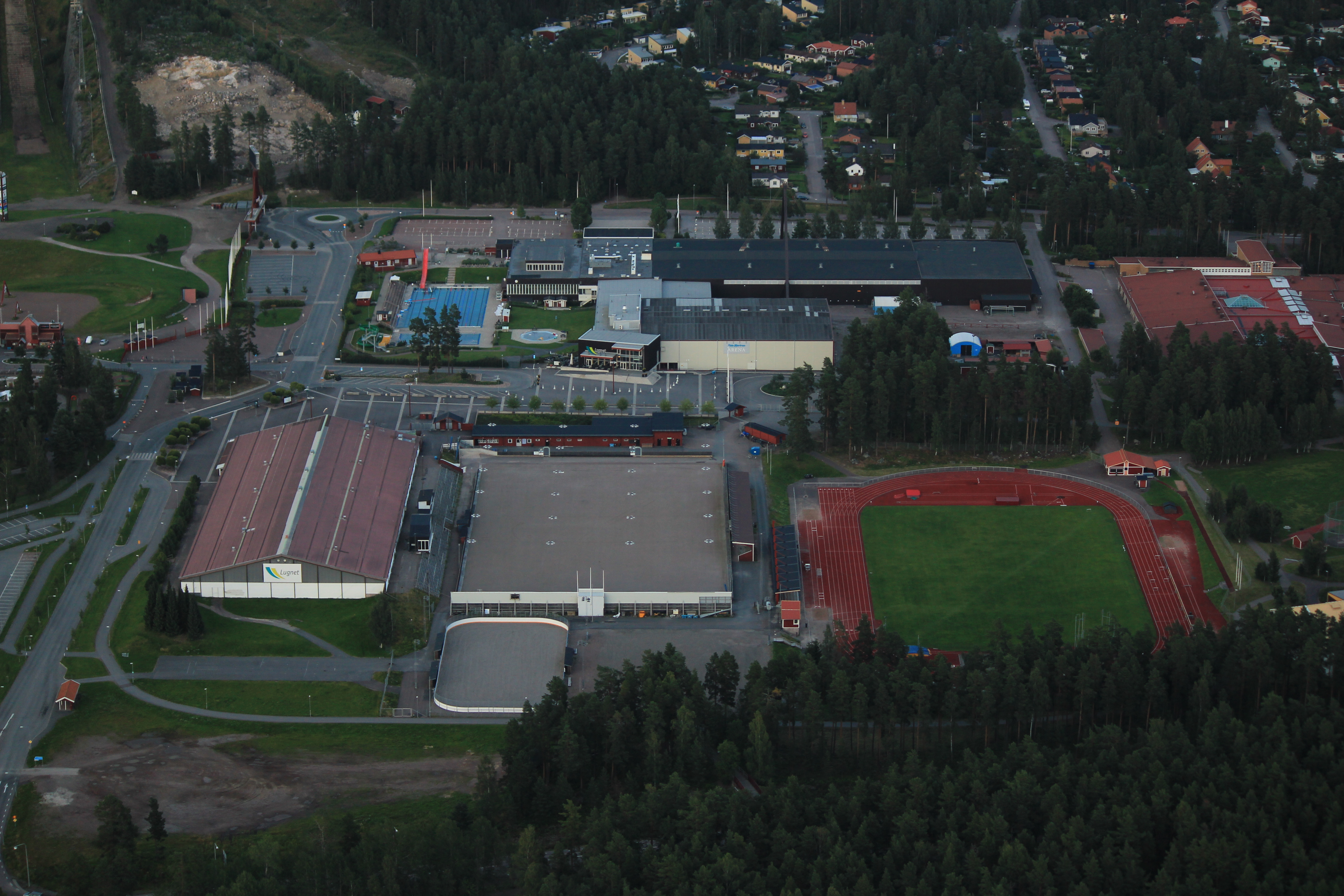

Lugnet is a large sport complex located in Falun, Sweden. 58 of the Swedish Sports Confederation's 67 special sports can be practiced there.

There are six full sized indoor pitches in the area where everything from dance to association football can be played or performed. There are also two swimming pools (one indoors and one outdoors), a tennis hall, an athletics arena, an ice arena including one indoor ice hockey rink, an outdoor ice hockey rink, a bandy field and a curling hall.

== Events ==
Lugnet is also Sweden's national cross-country skiing and ski jumping centre (the Lugnet Hills ski jump) and often hosts one part of the FIS Cross-Country World Cup. Several FIS Nordic World Ski Championships have been organised here (1974, 1993, 2015). The next one will be held there in 2027.

== Teams based at Lugnet ==
- IBF Falun – a local floorball team in the national league top division called Svenska Superligan. IBF Falun play their games in Guide Arena inaugurated in 2005 under the name FaluKuriren Arena, which holds 2,500 spectators.
- Falu BS – The local bandy team also play in the second top division called Bandyallsvenskan. They play their games at the bandy stadium which holds about 4,000 spectators.
- Falu IF – a local ice hockey team currently playing in the third top division called Hockeyettan. Their arena Lugnets Ishall holds 2,500 spectators with current safety regulations.
