= Gabriella Carrel =

Italian cross-country skier

Personal information
- Nationality: Italy
- Born: 30 July 1966 (age 59) Aosta, Italy

Sport
- Sport: Skiing

World Cup career
- Seasons: 3 – (1987–1989)
- Indiv. starts: 4
- Indiv. podiums: 0
- Team starts: 1
- Team podiums: 0
- Overall titles: 0

Gabriella Carrel (born 30 July 1966) is an Italian cross-country skier.

Carrel was born in Aosta. Competing in the 1988 Winter Olympics at Calgary, she finished 42nd in the women's 5 km event.

== Cross-country skiing results ==
All results are sourced from the International Ski Federation (FIS).

=== Olympic Games ===
Year	Age	5 km	10 km	20 km	4 × 5 km relay
1988	21	42	—	—	—

=== World Championships ===
Year	Age	10 km classical	10 km freestyle	15 km	30 km	4 × 5 km relay
1989	22	22	—	—	26	6

=== World Cup ===
==== Season standings ====
Season	Age	Overall
1987	20	NC
1988	21	NC
1989	22	NC
