= Lis Frost =

Swedish cross-country skier (born 1961)

Personal information
- Full name: Lis Birgitta Magdalena Frost Danielsson
- Nationality: Sweden
- Born: 11 November 1961 Fjällsjö, Sweden

Sport
- Sport: Skiing

World Cup career
- Seasons: 12 – (1986–1997)
- Indiv. starts: 29
- Indiv. podiums: 0
- Team starts: 10
- Team podiums: 2
- Team wins: 1
- Overall titles: 0 – (33rd in 1989)
- Discipline titles: 0

Lis Frost (born 11 November 1961) is a Swedish cross-country skier who competed from 1982 to 1997. Competing in three Winter Olympics, she earned her best overall finish of sixth in the 4 × 5 km relay at Calgary in 1988 and her best individual finish of 28th in the 30 km event at Lillehammer in 1994.

Frost's best finish at the FIS Nordic World Ski Championships was tenth in the 10 km event at Val di Fiemme in 1991. Her best World Cup career finish was fifth in a 30 km event in East Germany in 1989

== Cross-country skiing results ==
All results are sourced from the International Ski Federation (FIS).

=== Olympic Games ===
Year	Age	5 km	10 km	15 km	Pursuit	20 km	30 km	4 × 5 km relay
1988	26	—	—	—N/a	—N/a	21	—N/a	6
1992	30	—	—N/a	31	—	—N/a	47	—
1994	32	—	—N/a	—	28	—N/a	—	—

=== World Championships ===
Year	Age	5 km	10 km classical	10 km freestyle	15 km	Pursuit	20 km	30 km	4 × 5 km relay
1982	20	—	30	—N/a	—N/a	—N/a	32	—N/a	—
1987	25	—	—	—N/a	—N/a	—N/a	30	—N/a	—
1989	27	—N/a	—	28	20	—N/a	—N/a	—	—
1991	29	—	—N/a	10	—	—N/a	—N/a	28	6
1993	31	—	—N/a	—N/a	DNS	—	—N/a	39	—

=== World Cup ===
==== Season standings ====
Season	Age	Overall	Long Distance	Sprint
1986	25	38	—N/a	—N/a
1987	26	NC	—N/a	—N/a
1988	27	43	—N/a	—N/a
1989	28	33	—N/a	—N/a
1990	29	NC	—N/a	—N/a
1991	30	37	—N/a	—N/a
1992	31	NC	—N/a	—N/a
1994	32	52	—N/a	—N/a
1995	33	NC	—N/a	—N/a
1996	34	NC	—N/a	—N/a
1997	35	NC	NC	—

==== Team podiums ====
- 1 victory
- 2 podiums

No.	Season	Date	Location	Race	Level	Place	Teammates
1	1985–86	13 March 1986	Oslo, Norway	4 × 5 km Relay F	World Cup	1st	Görlin / Lamberg-Skog / Dahlman
2	1993–94	13 March 1994	Falun, Sweden	4 × 5 km Relay F	World Cup	3rd	Frithioff / Westin / Ordina
