= West Germany at the 1988 Winter Olympics =

- Flag of Germany
- IOC code: FRG
- NOC: National Olympic Committee for Germany

in Calgary
- Competitors: 90 (71 men, 19 women) in 10 sports
- Flag bearer: Peter Angerer (biathlon)
- Medals Ranked 8th: Gold 2 Silver 4 Bronze 2 Total 8

Winter Olympics appearances (overview)
- 1968; 1972; 1976; 1980; 1984; 1988

Other related appearances
- Germany (1928–1936, 1952, 1992–); United Team of Germany (1956–1964)

West Germany (Federal Republic of Germany) competed at the Winter Olympic Games for the last time as a separate nation at the 1988 Winter Olympics in Calgary, Alberta, Canada. Following German reunification in 1990, a single German team would compete in the 1992 Winter Olympics.

== Medalists ==
Medal	Name	Sport	Event	Date
Gold	Marina Kiehl	Alpine skiing	Women's downhill	19 February
Gold	Thomas Müller; Hans-Peter Pohl; Hubert Schwarz	Nordic combined	Team	24 February
Silver	Georg Hackl	Luge	Men's singles	15 February
Silver	Christa Kinshofer-Güthlein	Alpine skiing	Women's giant slalom	24 February
Silver	Ernst Reiter; Stefan Höck; Peter Angerer; Fritz Fischer	Biathlon	Relay	26 February
Silver	Frank Wörndl	Alpine skiing	Men's slalom	27 February
Bronze	Thomas Schwab; Wolfgang Staudinger	Luge	Doubles	19 February
Bronze	Christa Kinshofer-Güthlein	Alpine skiing	Women's slalom	26 February

== Competitors ==
The following is the list of number of competitors in the Games.

Sport	Men	Women	Total
Alpine skiing	9	8	17
Biathlon	5	–	5
Bobsleigh	8	–	8
Cross-country skiing	5	4	9
Figure skating	4	4	8
Ice hockey	23	–	23
Luge	6	1	7
Nordic combined	4	–	4
Ski jumping	5	–	5
Speed skating	3	2	5
Total	71	19	90

== Alpine skiing ==
Men

Athlete	Event	Race 1	Race 2	Total	
Athlete	Event	Time	Time	Time	Rank
Peter Dürr	Downhill			2:04.32	21
Hansjörg Tauscher	Downhill			2:04.31	20
Hannes Zehentner	Downhill			2:03.23	13
Markus Wasmeier	Downhill			2:02.03	6
Michael Eder	Super-G			DNF	–
Markus Wasmeier	Super-G			DNF	–
Peter Roth	Super-G			DNF	–
Frank Wörndl	Super-G			DNF	–
Peter Roth	Giant Slalom	DNF	–	DNF	–
Armin Bittner	Giant Slalom	1:08.56	1:04.71	2:13.27	26
Markus Wasmeier	Giant Slalom	1:06.60	1:05.09	2:11.69	19
Frank Wörndl	Giant Slalom	1:06.10	1:03.12	2:09.22	8
Peter Roth	Slalom	DNF	–	DNF	–
Armin Bittner	Slalom	DNF	–	DNF	–
Florian Beck	Slalom	53.11	48.33	1:41.44	10
Frank Wörndl	Slalom	50.99	48.54	1:39.53	2nd place, silver medalist(s)

Men's combined

Athlete	Downhill	Slalom		Total	
Athlete	Time	Time 1	Time 2	Points	Rank
Armin Bittner	1:55.42	42.82	42.82	99.65	11
Markus Wasmeier	1:49.32	45.32	44.52	65.44	7
Hannes Zehentner	1:49.16	59.52	47.33	197.87	22
Peter Dürr	1:48.30	49.84	48.84	123.92	17

Women

Athlete	Event	Race 1	Race 2	Total	
Athlete	Event	Time	Time	Time	Rank
Christina Meier-Höck	Downhill			1:29.30	21
Michaela Gerg-Leitner	Downhill			1:27.83	13
Regine Mösenlechner	Downhill			1:27.16	7
Marina Kiehl	Downhill			1:25.86	1st place, gold medalist(s)
Marina Kiehl	Super-G			1:21.11	13
Michaela Gerg-Leitner	Super-G			1:20.98	10
Christa Kinshofer-Güthlein	Super-G			1:20.98	10
Regine Mösenlechner	Super-G			1:20.33	4
Marina Kiehl	Giant Slalom	1:02.11	DNF	DNF	–
Michaela Gerg-Leitner	Giant Slalom	1:00.81	DNF	DNF	–
Christina Meier-Höck	Giant Slalom	1:00.43	1:07.45	2:07.88	5
Christa Kinshofer-Güthlein	Giant Slalom	59.98	1:07.44	2:07.42	2nd place, silver medalist(s)
Anette Gersch	Slalom	DNF	–	DNF	–
Christa Kinshofer-Güthlein	Slalom	49.84	48.56	1:38.40	3rd place, bronze medalist(s)

Women's combined

Athlete	Downhill	Slalom		Total	
Athlete	Time	Time 1	Time 2	Points	Rank
Michaela Gerg-Leitner	DSQ	–	–	DSQ	–
Christa Kinshofer-Güthlein	1:19.83	DNF	–	DNF	–
Karin Dedler	1:18.80	43.38	45.65	105.18	14
Ulrike Stanggassinger	1:17.92	42.68	43.93	71.51	9

== Biathlon ==
Men

Event	Athlete	Misses ^{1}	Time	Rank
10 km Sprint	Stefan Höck	3	27:26.2	26
10 km Sprint	Ernst Reiter	2	26:50.2	19
10 km Sprint	Fritz Fischer	1	26:25.9	12
10 km Sprint	Peter Angerer	2	26:13.2	10

Event	Athlete	Time	Misses	Adjusted time ^{2}	Rank
20 km	Ernst Reiter	56:54.8	5	1'01:54.8	29
20 km	Fritz Fischer	56:04.5	5	1'01:04.5	23
20 km	Herbert Fritzenwenger	56:27.8	4	1'00:27.8	17
20 km	Peter Angerer	55:46.7	3	58:46.7	10

Men's 4 x 7.5 km relay

Athletes	Race		
Athletes	Misses ^{1}	Time	Rank
Ernst Reiter; Stefan Höck; Peter Angerer; Fritz Fischer	0	1'23:37.4	2nd place, silver medalist(s)

^{1}A penalty loop of 150 metres had to be skied per missed target.
^{2}One minute added per missed target.

== Bobsleigh ==
Sled	Athletes	Event	Run 1		Run 2		Run 3		Run 4		Total	
Sled	Athletes	Event	Time	Rank	Time	Rank	Time	Rank	Time	Rank	Time	Rank
FRG-1	Anton Fischer; Christoph Langen	Two-man	57.58	6	59.70	10	1:00.06	6	59.28	7	3:56.62	7
FRG-2	Michael Sperr; Rolf Müller	Two-man	57.47	5	1:00.09	16	1:00.42	11	59.86	14	3:57.84	11

Sled	Athletes	Event	Run 1		Run 2		Run 3		Run 4		Total	
Sled	Athletes	Event	Time	Rank	Time	Rank	Time	Rank	Time	Rank	Time	Rank
FRG-1	Michael Sperr; Olaf Hampel; Florian Cruciger; Rolf Müller	Four-man	57.58	19	58.04	13	56.41	4	58.14	15	3:50.17	14
FRG-2	Anton Fischer; Franz Nießner; Uwe Eisenreich; Christoph Langen	Four-man	57.02	9	57.75	10	56.71	11	58.07	12	3:49.55	11

== Cross-country skiing ==
Men

Event	Athlete	Race	
Event	Athlete	Time	Rank
15 km C	Walter Kuß	44:29.0	27
15 km C	Jochen Behle	43:59.7	23
30 km C	Stefan Dotzler	1'33:06.1	40
30 km C	Jochen Behle	1'30:08.3	23
50 km F	Walter Kuß	DNF	–
50 km F	Georg Fischer	2'13:31.3	34
50 km F	Herbert Fritzenwenger	2'13:27.6	33

C = Classical style, F = Freestyle

Men's 4 × 10 km relay

Athletes	Race	
Athletes	Time	Rank
Walter Kuß; Georg Fischer; Jochen Behle; Herbert Fritzenwenger	1'48:05.0	7

Women

Event	Athlete	Race	
Event	Athlete	Time	Rank
5 km C	Sonja Bilgeri	17:33.2	48
5 km C	Birgit Kohlrusch	17:10.3	44
5 km C	Stefanie Birkelbach	17:09.1	43
5 km C	Karin Jäger	16:28.0	28
10 km C	Sonja Bilgeri	35:07.0	44
10 km C	Karin Jäger	32:09.5	24
20 km F	Sonja Bilgeri	DNF	–
20 km F	Stefanie Birkelbach	1'04:40.5	45
20 km F	Birgit Kohlrusch	1'03:16.2	41
20 km F	Karin Jäger	1'02:34.6	35

C = Classical style, F = Freestyle

Women's 4 × 5 km relay

Athletes	Race	
Athletes	Time	Rank
Stefanie Birkelbach; Karin Jäger; Birgit Kohlrusch; Sonja Bilgeri	1'05:48.6	11

== Figure skating ==
Men

Athlete	CF	SP	FS	TFP	Rank
Richard Zander	9	17	11	23.2	11
Heiko Fischer	4	11	10	16.8	9

Women

Athlete	CF	SP	FS	TFP	Rank
Marina Kielmann	12	11	10	19.6	10
Claudia Leistner	6	9	6	13.2	6

Pairs

Athletes	SP	FS	TFP	Rank
Brigitte Groh; Holger Maletz	13	11	17.5	11

Ice Dancing

Athletes	CD	OD	FD	TFP	Rank
Antonia Becherer; Ferdinand Becherer	9	9	9	18.0	9

== Ice hockey ==
=== Group B ===
Top three teams (shaded ones) entered the medal round.

	Pld	W	L	T	GF	GA	Pts
Soviet Union	5	5	0	0	32	10	10
West Germany	5	4	1	0	19	12	8
Czechoslovakia	5	3	2	0	23	14	6
United States	5	2	3	0	27	27	4
Austria	5	0	4	1	12	29	1
Norway	5	0	4	1	11	32	1

- West Germany 2-1 Czechoslovakia
- West Germany 7-3 Norway
- Austria 1-3 West Germany
- West Germany 3-6 Soviet Union
- West Germany 4-1 USA

=== Final round ===
The top three teams from each group play the top three teams from the other group once. Points from previous games against their own group carry over.

	Pld	W	L	T	GF	GA	Pts
Soviet Union	5	4	1	0	25	7	8
Finland	5	3	1	1	18	10	7
Sweden	5	2	1	2	15	16	6
Canada	5	2	2	1	17	14	5
West Germany 5th	5	1	4	0	8	26	2
Czechoslovakia	5	1	4	0	12	22	2

- Finland 8-0 West Germany
- Canada 8-1 West Germany
- Sweden 3-2 West Germany

=== Leading scorers ===
Rk		GP	G	A	Pts	PIM
10th	Gerd Truntschka	8	3	7	10	10

Team roster

- Ron Fischer
- Udo Kiessling
- Horst-Peter Kretschmer
- Dieter Medicus
- Andreas Niederberger
- Harold Kreis
- Manfred Schuster
- Manfred Wolf
- Christian Brittig
- Peter Draisaitl
- Georg Franz
- Dieter Hegen
- Georg Holzmann
- Peter Obresa
- Roy Roedger
- Peter Schiller
- Helmut Steiger
- Gerd Truntschka
- Bernd Truntschka
- Joachim Reil
- Helmut de Raaf
- Josef Schlickenrieder
- Karl Friesen

- Head coach: Xaver Unsinn

== Luge ==
Men

Athlete	Run 1		Run 2		Run 3		Run 4		Total	
Athlete	Time	Rank	Time	Rank	Time	Rank	Time	Rank	Time	Rank
Max Burghardtswieser	46.874	13	46.949	11	47.083	14	47.280	15	3:08.186	13
Johannes Schettel	46.725	9	46.928	10	46.805	7	46.913	8	3:07.371	7
Georg Hackl	46.355	2	46.553	2	46.599	4	46.409	2	3:05.916	2nd place, silver medalist(s)

(Men's) Doubles

Athletes	Run 1		Run 2		Total	
Athletes	Time	Rank	Time	Rank	Time	Rank
Thomas Schwab; Wolfgang Staudinger	46.024	4	46.250	5	1:32.274	3rd place, bronze medalist(s)
Stefan Ilsanker; Georg Hackl	46.054	5	46.244	4	1:32.298	4

Women

Athlete	Run 1		Run 2		Run 3		Run 4		Total	
Athlete	Time	Rank	Time	Rank	Time	Rank	Time	Rank	Time	Rank
Veronika Bilgeri	46.321	4	46.375	4	46.369	4	46.605	7	3:05.670	4

== Nordic combined ==
Men's individual

Events:

- normal hill ski jumping (Best two out of three jumps.)
- 15 km cross-country skiing (Start delay, based on ski jumping results.)

Athlete	Event	Ski Jumping		Cross-country		Total	
Athlete	Event	Points	Rank	Start at	Time	Points	Rank
Hermann Weinbuch	Individual	179.6	39	5:26.0	44:26.4	387.390	29
Thomas Müller	Individual	190.4	31	4:14.0	44:02.7	390.945	25
Hans-Peter Pohl	Individual	204.3	15	2:41.4	44:23.9	387.775	28
Hubert Schwarz	Individual	219.2	2	1:02.0	42:35.8	403.980	13

Men's Team

Three participants per team.

Events:

- normal hill ski jumping (Three jumps per team member per round, best two rounds counted.)
- 10 km cross-country skiing (Start delay, based on ski jumping results.)

Athletes	Ski jumping		Cross-country		Total
Athletes	Points	Rank	Start at	Time	Rank
Thomas Müller; Hans-Peter Pohl; Hubert Schwarz	629.8	1	0:00.0	1'20:46.0	1st place, gold medalist(s)

== Ski jumping ==
Athlete	Event	Jump 1		Jump 2		Total	
Athlete	Event	Distance	Points	Distance	Points	Points	Rank
Dieter Thoma	Normal hill	75.0	78.1	74.0	76.0	154.1	55
Josef Heumann	Normal hill	77.0	84.3	80.0	92.1	176.4	31
Andi Bauer	Normal hill	78.5	87.2	79.5	90.3	177.5	29
Thomas Klauser	Normal hill	80.5	94.4	71.0	70.7	165.1	47
Josef Heumann	Large hill	102.0	90.7	95.0	76.4	167.1	36
Andi Bauer	Large hill	103.0	94.1	93.5	75.8	169.9	34
Peter Rohwein	Large hill	106.0	96.3	96.0	81.3	177.6	25
Thomas Klauser	Large hill	114.5	111.7	102.5	93.4	205.1	4

Men's team large hill

Athletes	Result	
Athletes	Points ^{1}	Rank
Andi Bauer; Peter Rohwein; Thomas Klauser; Josef Heumann	559.0	6

^{1}Four teams members performed two jumps each. The best three were counted.

== Speed skating ==
Men

Event	Athlete	Race	
Event	Athlete	Time	Rank
500 m	Uwe Streb	38.03	27
500 m	Hans-Peter Oberhuber	37.73	20
1000 m	Uwe Streb	DSQ	–
1000 m	Hans-Peter Oberhuber	1:16.62	32
1500 m	Hansjörg Baltes	1:57.08	30
5000 m	Hansjörg Baltes	6:59.45	24
10,000 m	Hansjörg Baltes	14:45.41	27

Women

Event	Athlete	Race	
Event	Athlete	Time	Rank
500 m	Monika Gawenus-Holzner-Pflug	40.53	7
1500 m	Anja Mischke	2:08.52	16
3000 m	Anja Mischke	4:26.30	12
