= Maria Theurl =

Austrian cross-country skier

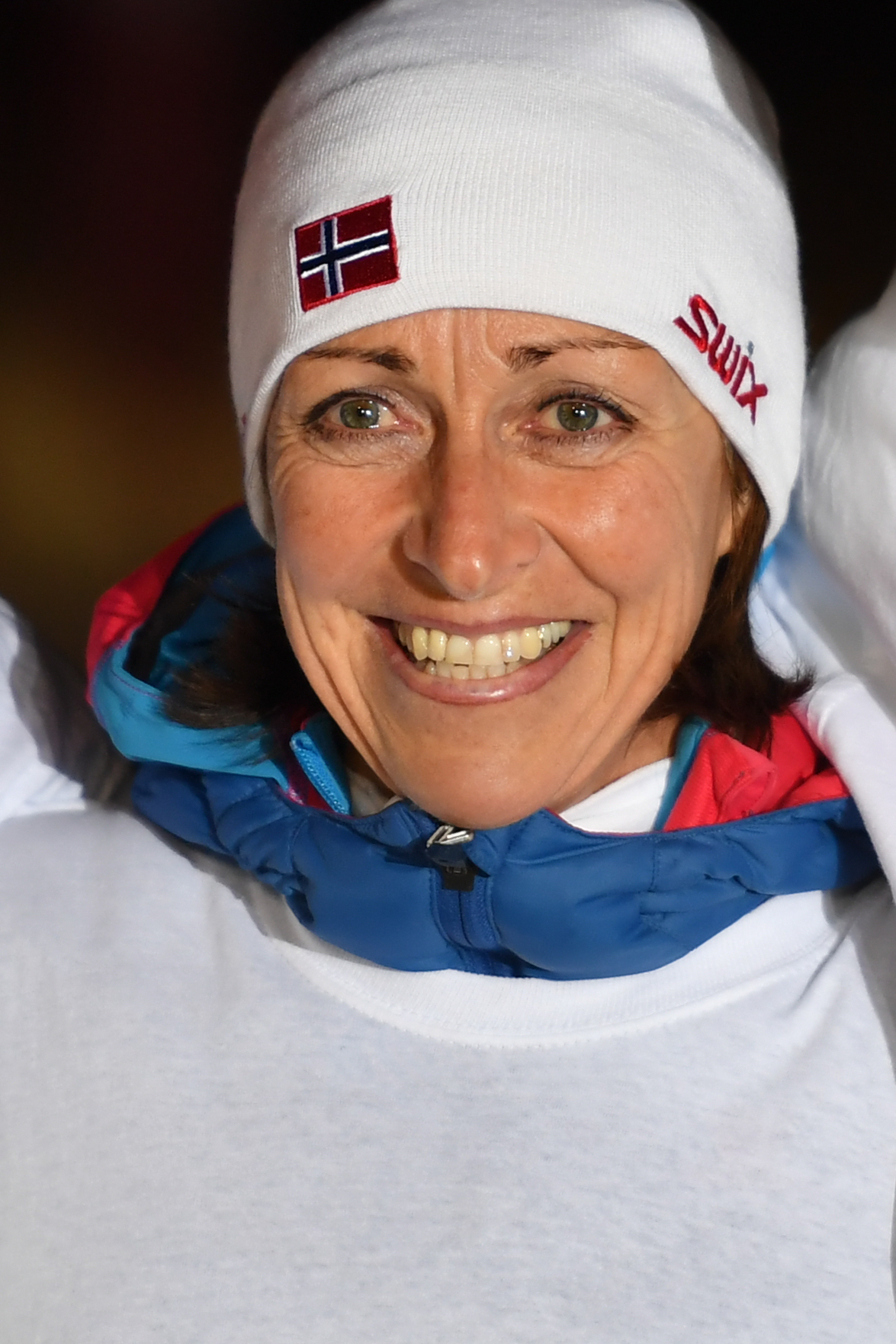

Personal information
- Nationality: Austria
- Born: 11 August 1966 (age 59) Assling, Austria

Sport
- Sport: Skiing
- Club: Kitzbüheler Ski Club

World Cup career
- Seasons: 1987–1990, 1993–2000
- Indiv. starts: 44
- Indiv. podiums: 1
- Indiv. wins: 0
- Team starts: 2
- Team podiums: 0
- Overall titles: 0 – 17th in 1998)
- Discipline titles: 0
Medal record
Women's cross-country skiing
Representing Austria
World Championships
Bronze medal – third place	1999 Ramsau	15 km freestyle

Maria Theurl (born August 11, 1966) is an Austrian cross country skier who competed from 1988 to 2000. She won a bronze medal in the 15 km at the 1999 FIS Nordic World Ski Championships in Ramsau.

Theurl's best individual finish at the Winter Olympics was 6th in the 30 km at Nagano in 1998. She also competed at the 1988 Winter Olympics. She won four individual events at 5 km in Austria from 1993 to 1999 during her career.

== Cross-country skiing results ==
All results are sourced from the International Ski Federation (FIS).

=== Olympic Games ===
Year	Age	5 km	10 km	15 km	Pursuit	20 km	30 km	4 × 5 km relay
1988	21	34	DNF	—N/a	—N/a	—	—N/a	—
1998	31	15	—N/a	DNS	13	—N/a	6	—

=== World Championships ===
- 1 medal – (1 bronze)

Year	Age	5 km	10 km classical	10 km freestyle	15 km	Pursuit	20 km	30 km	4 × 5 km relay
1987	20	—	—	—N/a	—N/a	—N/a	—	—N/a	10
1989	22	—N/a	—	35	—	—N/a	—N/a	38	10
1991	24	—	—N/a	49	—	—N/a	—N/a	—	—
1993	26	—	—N/a	—N/a	—	—	—N/a	41	—
1997	30	37	—N/a	—N/a	11	DNF	—N/a	37	—
1999	32	12	—N/a	—N/a	Bronze	9	—N/a	9	—

=== World Cup ===
==== Season standings ====
Season	Age				
Season	Age	Overall	Long Distance	Middle Distance	Sprint
1987	20	NC	—N/a	—N/a	—N/a
1988	21	51	—N/a	—N/a	—N/a
1989	22	NC	—N/a	—N/a	—N/a
1990	23	NC	—N/a	—N/a	—N/a
1993	26	NC	—N/a	—N/a	—N/a
1994	27	NC	—N/a	—N/a	—N/a
1995	28	60	—N/a	—N/a	—N/a
1996	29	23	—N/a	—N/a	—N/a
1997	30	31	24	—N/a	40
1998	31	23	19	—N/a	22
1999	32	17	10	—N/a	31
2000	33	25	13	24	NC

==== Individual podiums ====
- 1 podium

No.	Season	Date	Location	Race	Level	Place
1	1998–99	19 February 1999	Ramsau, Austria	15 km Individual F	World Championships^{[1]}	3rd

Note: ^{1} Until the 1999 World Championships, World Championship races were included in the World Cup scoring system.
