= Engadin Skimarathon =

Annual cross-country skiing competition in Switzerland

- Status: Active
- Genre: Sporting event
- Date: March
- Frequency: Annual
- Location: Graubünden
- Country: Switzerland
- Inaugurated: 1969

The Engadin Skimarathon is an annual cross-country skiing race (ski marathon) held on the second Sunday of March in the upper Engadine valley (Switzerland), between Maloja and S-chanf. It debuted in 1969 and has been a part of Worldloppet as long as Worldloppet has existed. It is one of the major cross-country skiing events in the Alps. Between 11,000 and 14,200 skiers participate each year. The total distance covered is 42 km (26 mi), although it is also possible to complete the half-marathon of 21 km (13 mi) (finishing in Pontresina) or the 17 km (11 mi) Women's Race (Samedan to S-chanf). While it is a freestyle race, there are separate tracks for skiers practicing classic style for all but the narrowest parts of the race. Participation is open to anyone from the age of 16, and no licence is required to sign up.

The track record of 1:16:10 was set by Hervé Balland in 1994. In the same year, Silvia Honegger completed the race with the female track record of 1:22:08. As the race was extended by 2 km (1.2 mi) in 1998 to match the distance of a full marathon and the track was changed slightly in the Stazerwald section, resulting in a more difficult topography, longer racetimes are now standard.

The start of the race takes place at the Maloja Palace Hotel with an elevation of 1,820 metres (5,970 ft). The track then leads over both Lake Sils and Lake Silvaplana (which are frozen at this time of year). After passing St. Moritz there is a forested climb in the Stazerwald. The proceeding descent to Pontresina is regarded by many as the most spectacular part of the race for spectators, due to the high number of falls and crashes by skiers. The race then follows the runway of Samedan Airport and afterwards continues on the right side of the Engadin valley, passing several small communities before reaching the Finish in S-chanf at an elevation of 1,670 metres (5,480 ft).

== Winners ==
Year	Men's	Time	Women's	Time	Participants
1969	(Switzerland) Karl Wagenführ (SUI)	2:19:38 h	(Switzerland) Rita Czech-Blasl (SUI)	2:54:26 h	945
1970	(Switzerland) Werner Geeser (SUI)	2:24:28 h	(Switzerland) Ursula Bösch (SUI)	3:13:00 h	2124
1971	(Switzerland) Albert Giger (SUI)	2:02:58 h	(Norway) Ingrid Hadler (NOR)	2:37:54 h	4010
1972	(Switzerland) Flury Koch (SUI)	2:01:30 h	(Switzerland) Rosmarie Kurz (SUI)	2:34:45 h	4737
1973	(Switzerland) Albert Giger -2- (Switzerland) Edy Hauser (SUI)	1:59:58 h	(Switzerland) Rosmarie Kurz -2-	2:33:51 h	6032
1974	(Switzerland) Alfred Kälin (SUI)	1:53:15 h	(Switzerland) Rosmarie Kurz -3-	2:24:26 h	7406
1975	(Switzerland) August Broger (SUI)	1:42:44 h	(Switzerland) Rosmarie Kurz -4-	2:08:42 h	9735
1976	(Switzerland) Albert Giger -3-	1:55:39 h	(Switzerland) Rosmarie Kurz -5- (Switzerland) Ursula Bösch (SUI)	2:21:06 h	10126
1977	(Switzerland) Albert Giger -4-	1:45:16 h	(Switzerland) Rosmarie Kurz -6-	2:11:11 h	10248
1978	(Switzerland) Albert Giger -5-	1:38:25 h	(Switzerland) Christine Brügger (SUI)	1:58:03 h	12032
1979	(Switzerland) Alois Oberholzer (SUI)	2:03:01 h	(Switzerland) Christine Brügger -2-	2:17:39 h	12191
1980	(Sweden) Ola Hassis (SWE)	1:57:07 h	(Switzerland) Evi Kratzer (SUI)	2:12:23 h	12536
1981	(United States) Bill Koch (USA)	2:00:18 h	(Switzerland) Cornelia Thomas (SUI)	2:12:03 h	11685
1982	(Sweden) Lars Frykberg (SWE)	1:50:05 h	(Switzerland) Evi Kratzer -2-	2:06:02 h	10638
1983	(Sweden) Lars Frykberg -2-	1:34:08 h	(Switzerland) Evi Kratzer -3-	1:44:15 h	10238
1984	(Switzerland) Konrad Hallenbarter (SUI)	1:42:09 h	(Switzerland) Evi Kratzer -4-	1:55:04 h	11056
1985	(Switzerland) Andreas Grünenfelder (SUI)	1:37:15 h	(Switzerland) Evi Kratzer -5-	1:47:06 h	11439
1986	(Switzerland) Konrad Hallenbarter -2-	1:43:39 h	(Switzerland) Karin Thomas (SUI)	1:55:51 h	11613
1987	(Switzerland) Daniel Sandoz (SUI)	1:29:34 h	(Switzerland) Christine Brügger -3-	1:38:57 h	11140
1988	(Switzerland) Andreas Grünenfelder -2-	1:35:55 h	(Switzerland) Christine Brügger -4-	1:38:11 h	11758
1989	(Czech Republic) Ladislav Svanda (CZE)	1:25:02 h	(Switzerland) Sandra Parpan (SUI)	1:29:57 h	11673
1990	(Switzerland) Konrad Hallenbarter -3-	1:24:54 h	(Italy) Guidina Dal Sasso (ITA)	1:28:58 h	11502
1991	Race cancelled due to warm weather				
1992	(Italy) Daniel Sandoz -2- (Italy) Silvano Barco (ITA)	1:21:06 h	(Switzerland) Elvira Knecht (SUI)	1:25:37 h	11962
1993	(France) Hervé Balland (FRA)	1:22:10 h	(Switzerland) Silvia Honegger (SUI)	1:26:56 h	12019
1994	(France) Hervé Balland -2-	1:16:10 h	(Switzerland) Silvia Honegger -2-	1:22:08 h	12571
1995	(Switzerland) André Jungen (SUI)	1:25:41 h	(Austria) Maria Theurl (AUT)	1:32:24 h	12295
1996	(France) Hervé Balland -3-	1:24:18 h	(Austria) Maria Theurl -2-	1:32:32 h	12263
1997	(Austria) Mikhail Botvinov (AUT)	1:19:41 h	(Norway) Anita Moen (NOR)	1:25:15 h	12687
1998	(Austria) Christian Hoffmann (AUT)	1:23:44 h	(Austria) Maria Theurl -3-	1:30:50 h	13527
1999	(Norway) Tor Arne Hetland (NOR)	1:25:21 h	(Switzerland) Brigitte Albrecht (SUI)	1:29:19 h	12640
2000	(Austria) Gerhard Urain (AUT)	1:25:29 h	(Russia) Yuliya Chepalova (RUS)	1:28:19 h	12711
2001	(Germany) Peter Schlickenrieder (GER)	1:24:22 h	(Switzerland) Brigitte Albrecht -2-	1:29:19 h	11862
2002	(Spain) Juan Jesús Gutiérrez (ESP)	1:30:10 h	(Switzerland) Brigitte Albrecht -3-	1:34:48 h	11967
2003	(Switzerland) Patrik Mächler (SUI)	1:28:00 h	(Switzerland) Natascia Leonardi Cortesi (SUI)	1:32:21 h	12222
2004	(France) Christophe Perrilat (FRA)	1:32:40 h	(Russia) Yuliya Chepalova -2-	1:37:53 h	12794
2005	(Switzerland) Gion Andrea Bundi (SUI)	1:34:01 h	(Switzerland) Natascia Leonardi Cortesi -2-	1:40:19 h	11221
2006	(Austria) Mikhail Botvinov -2-	1:55:51 h	(Switzerland) Natascia Leonardi Cortesi -3-	2:01:22 h	12254
2007	(Switzerland) Dario Cologna (SUI)	1:43:44 h	(Switzerland) Laurence Rochat (SUI)	1:50:33 h	10441
2008	(Norway) Tor Arne Hetland -2-	1:24:30 h	(Germany) Katrin Zeller (GER)	1:33:27 h	11512
2009	(Italy) Fabio Santus (ITA)	1:38:37 h	(Switzerland) Seraina Mischol (SUI)	1:43:32 h	11028
2010	(Switzerland) Dario Cologna -2- (SUI)	1:36:58 h	(Sweden) Susanne Nyström (SWE)	1:43:02 h	11252
2011	(Switzerland) Remo Fischer (SUI)	1:39:51 h	(Italy) Antonella Confortola Wyatt (ITA)	1:48:00 h	11907
2012	(Switzerland) Roman Furger (SUI)	1:31:21 h	(France) Anouk Faivre-Picon (FRA)	1:36:28 h	11787
2013	(France) Pierre Guedon (FRA)	1:28:19 h	(Finland) Riitta-Liisa Roponen (FIN)	1:29:52 h	12480
2014	(Norway) Anders Gløersen (NOR)	1:35:05 h	(Finland) Riitta-Liisa Roponen -2- (FIN)	1:38:39 h	13327
2015	(Russia) Ilia Chernousov (RUS)	1:34:50 h	(France) Anouk Faivre-Picon -2- (FRA)	1:38:35 h	13246
2016	(Switzerland) Roman Furger -2- (SUI)	1:48:01 h	(France) Anouk Faivre-Picon -3- (FRA)	1:54:07 h	13246
2017	(Switzerland) Dario Cologna -3- (SUI)	1:27:46 h	(Norway) Mari Eide (NOR)	1:34.18 h	13246
2018	(Switzerland) Roman Furger -3- (SUI)	1:34:05 h	(Switzerland) Nadine Fähndrich (SUI)	1:38:35 h	13246
2019	(Switzerland) Dario Cologna -4- (SUI)	1:22:22 h	(Switzerland) Nathalie von Siebenthal (SUI)	1:30:41 h	13246

== See also ==
- Skiing and skiing topics
