= Annika Dahlman =

Swedish cross-country skier

Personal information
- Nationality: Sweden
- Born: January 24, 1964 (age 62) Skövde, Sweden

Sport
- Sport: Skiing
- Club: Dala-Järna IK

World Cup career
- Seasons: 5 – (1984–1988)
- Indiv. starts: 12
- Indiv. podiums: 1
- Indiv. wins: 0
- Team starts: 3
- Team podiums: 2
- Team wins: 1
- Overall titles: 0 – (15th in 1987)
Medal record
Representing Sweden
Women's cross-country skiing
World Championships
Bronze medal – third place	1987 Oberstdorf	4 × 5 km relay

Annika Dahlman (born January 24, 1964) is a former Swedish cross-country skier who competed during the 1980s. She won a bronze medal in the 4 × 5 km relay at the 1987 FIS Nordic World Ski Championships in Oberstdorf and finished seventh in the 5 km event at those championships.

Dahlman's best career individual finish was second in a 10 km World Cup event at Calgary in 1987.

== Cross-country skiing results ==
All results are sourced from the International Ski Federation (FIS).

=== Olympic Games ===
Year	Age	5 km	10 km	20 km	4 × 5 km relay
1988	24	—	28	—	—

=== World Championships ===
- 1 medals – (1 bronze)

Year	Age	5 km	10 km	20 km	4 × 5 km relay
1985	21	—	34	—	—
1987	23	7	17	—	Bronze

=== World Cup ===
==== Season standings ====
Season	Age	Overall
1984	20	66
1985	21	30
1986	22	44
1987	23	15
1988	24	32

==== Individual podiums ====
- 1 podium

No.	Season	Date	Location	Race	Level	Place
1	1986–87	10 January 1987	Canmore, Canada	10 km Individual C	World Cup	2nd

==== Team podiums ====
- 1 victory
- 2 podiums

No.	Season	Date	Location	Race	Level	Place	Teammates
1	1985–86	13 March 1986	Oslo, Norway	4 × 5 km Relay F	World Cup	1st	Frost / Görlin / Lamberg-Skog
2	1986–87	17 February 1987	Oberstdorf, West Germany	4 × 5 km Relay F	World Championships^{[1]}	3rd	Wallin / Lamberg-Skog / Westin

Note: ^{1} Until the 1999 World Championships, World Championship races were included in the World Cup scoring system.
