= Elena Desderi =

Italian cross-country skier

Personal information
- Nationality: Italy
- Born: 20 September 1967 (age 58) Demonte, Italy

Sport
- Sport: Skiing

World Cup career
- Seasons: 3 – (1988–1989, 1992)
- Indiv. starts: 4
- Indiv. podiums: 0
- Team starts: 3
- Team podiums: 0
- Overall titles: 0

Elena Desderi (born 20 September 1967) is an Italian former cross-country skier. She competed in two events at the 1988 Winter Olympics.

== Cross-country skiing results ==
All results are sourced from the International Ski Federation (FIS).

=== Olympic Games ===
Year	Age	5 km	10 km	20 km	4 × 5 km relay
1988	20	—	—	36	10

=== World Championships ===
Year	Age	5 km	10 km classical	10 km freestyle	15 km	20 km	30 km	4 × 5 km relay
1987	19	—	—	—N/a	—N/a	—	—N/a	5
1989	21	—N/a	—	25	—	—N/a	23	6
1991	23	—	—N/a	18	—	—N/a	—	—

=== World Cup ===
==== Season standings ====
Season	Age	Overall
1988	20	NC
1989	21	NC
1992	24	NC
