= Margot Kober =

Austrian cross-country skier

Personal information
- Nationality: Austria
- Born: 20 February 1965 (age 61) Hopfgarten im Brixental, Austria

Sport
- Sport: Skiing

World Cup career
- Seasons: 1987–1988
- Indiv. starts: 4
- Indiv. podiums: 0
- Team starts: 1
- Team podiums: 0
- Overall titles: 0

Margot Kober (born 20 February 1965) is an Austrian cross-country skier. She competed in three events at the 1988 Winter Olympics.

== Cross-country skiing results ==
=== Olympic Games ===
| Year | Age | 5 km | 10 km | 20 km | 4 × 5 km relay |
|---|---|---|---|---|---|
| 1988 | 23 | 36 | 34 | DNF | — |

=== World Cup ===
==== Season standings ====
| Season | Age | Overall |
|---|---|---|
| 1987 | 22 | NC |
| 1988 | 23 | NC |
