= Vida Vencienė =

Lithuanian cross-country skier (born 1961)

Personal information
- Nationality: Lithuania
- Born: May 28, 1961 (age 65) Ukmergė, Lithuanian SSR, Soviet Union

Sport
- Sport: Skiing

World Cup career
- Seasons: 1986–1989, 1992–1994
- Indiv. starts: 32
- Indiv. podiums: 3
- Indiv. wins: 1
- Team starts: 0
- Overall titles: 0 – (5th in 1988)
Medal record
Women's cross-country skiing
Representing Soviet Union
Olympic Games
Gold medal – first place	1988 Calgary	10 km classical
Bronze medal – third place	1988 Calgary	5 km classical

Vida Vencienė (maiden name Vida Mogenytė; born 28 May 1961 in Ukmergė) is a former cross-country skier who represented the Soviet Union and later Lithuania from 1988 to 1994. She won a gold medal over 10 km and a bronze over 5 km at the 1988 Winter Olympics in Calgary for the Soviet Union.

Her best finish at the FIS Nordic World Ski Championships was seventh in the 30 km event in 1989. She also finished second in a 10 km event in a World Cup event in Leningrad in 1988.

== Cross-country skiing results ==
All results are sourced from the International Ski Federation (FIS).

=== Olympic Games ===
- 2 medals – (1 gold, 1 bronze)

Year	Age	5 km	10 km	15 km	Pursuit	20 km	30 km	4 × 5 km relay
1988	26	Bronze	Gold	—N/a	—N/a	—	—N/a	—
1992	30	19	—N/a	11	28	—N/a	16	—
1994	32	DNF	—N/a	32	—	—N/a	25	—

=== World Championships ===
Year	Age	5 km	10 km classical	10 km freestyle	15 km	Pursuit	20 km	30 km	4 × 5 km relay
1987	25	—	13	—N/a	—N/a	—N/a	—	—N/a	—
1989	27	—N/a	10	—	—	—N/a	—N/a	7	—
1993	31	20	—N/a	—N/a	24	28	—N/a	28	—

=== World Cup ===
==== Season standings ====
Season	Age	Overall
1986	24	19
1987	25	39
1988	26	5
1989	27	14
1992	30	27
1993	31	45
1994	32	48

==== Individual podiums ====
- 1 victory
- 3 podiums

No.	Season	Date	Location	Race	Level	Place
1	1987–88	9 January 1988	Leningrad, Soviet Union	10 km Individual C	World Cup	2nd
2	1987–88	14 February 1988	Calgary, Canada	10 km Individual C	Olympic Games^{[1]}	1st
3	1987–88	17 February 1988	Calgary, Canada	5 km Individual C	Olympic Games^{[1]}	3rd

Note: ^{1} Until the 1994 Olympics, Olympic races were included in the World Cup scoring system.
