= Leslie Krichko =

American cross-country skier (born 1959)

Personal information
- Nationality: United States
- Born: February 22, 1959 (age 67) Portland, Maine, United States

Sport
- Sport: Skiing

World Cup career
- Seasons: 3 – (1982, 1987–1988)
- Indiv. starts: 5
- Indiv. podiums: 0
- Team starts: 1
- Team podiums: 0
- Overall titles: 0 – (54th in 1982)

Leslie B. Bancroft-Krichko (born February 22, 1959, in Portland, Maine) is an American cross-country skier who competed from 1979 to 1988. She finished eighth in the 4 × 5 km relay at the 1988 Winter Olympics in Calgary. Bancroft-Krichko was also a skier at the University of Vermont.

== Cross-country skiing results ==
All results are sourced from the International Ski Federation (FIS).

=== Olympic Games ===
Year	Age	5 km	10 km	20 km	4 × 5 km relay
1980	21	33	28	—N/a	7
1988	29	31	36	—	8

=== World Cup ===
==== Season standings ====
Season	Age	Overall
1982	23	54
1987	28	NC
1988	29	NC
