= Jean McAllister =

Canadian cross-country skier

Personal information
- Nationality: Canada
- Born: 27 February 1964 (age 62)

Sport
- Sport: Skiing

World Cup career
- Seasons: 7 – (1983, 1985, 1987–1989, 1991–1992)
- Indiv. starts: 13
- Indiv. podiums: 0
- Team starts: 1
- Team podiums: 0
- Overall titles: 0

Jean McAllister (born 27 February 1964) is a Canadian former cross-country skier who competed in the 1988 Winter Olympics.

== Cross-country skiing results ==
All results are sourced from the International Ski Federation (FIS).

=== Olympic Games ===
Year	Age	5 km	10 km	20 km	4 × 5 km relay
1988	24	46	—	31	—

=== World Championships ===
Year	Age	5 km	10 km classical	10 km freestyle	15 km	30 km	4 × 5 km relay
1989	25	—N/a	42	33	31	29	—
1991	27	—	—N/a	44	44	45	—

=== World Cup ===
==== Season standings ====
Season	Age	Overall
1983	19	NC
1985	21	NC
1987	23	NC
1988	24	NC
1989	25	NC
1991	27	NC
1992	28	NC
