= Lorna Sasseville =

Canadian cross-country skier

Personal information
- Nationality: Canada
- Born: June 14, 1960 (age 66)

Sport
- Sport: Skiing

World Cup career
- Seasons: 4 – (1987–1989, 1992)
- Indiv. starts: 13
- Indiv. podiums: 0
- Team starts: 2
- Team podiums: 0
- Overall titles: 0

Lorna Sasseville (born 14 June 1960) is a Canadian former cross-country skier who competed in the 1988 Winter Olympics and in the 1992 Winter Olympics.

== Cross-country skiing results ==
All results are sourced from the International Ski Federation (FIS).

=== Olympic Games ===
Year	Age	5 km	10 km	15 km	Pursuit	20 km	30 km	4 × 5 km relay
1988	27	26	30	—N/a	—N/a	—	—N/a	9
1992	31	—	—N/a	40	—	—N/a	51	—

=== World Championships ===
Year	Age	5 km	10 km classical	10 km freestyle	15 km	20 km	30 km	4 × 5 km relay
1987	26	—	—	—N/a	—N/a	—	—N/a	7
1989	28	—N/a	36	29	21	—N/a	28	8
1991	30	42	—N/a	—	42	—N/a	—	11

=== World Cup ===
==== Season standings ====
Season	Age	Overall
1987	26	NC
1988	27	NC
1989	28	NC
1992	31	NC
