= Hildegard Embacher =

Austrian skier (born 1967)

Personal information
- Nationality: Austria
- Born: 10 May 1967 (age 59) Tyrol, Austria

Sport
- Sport: Skiing

World Cup career
- Seasons: 1987–1989
- Indiv. starts: 6
- Indiv. podiums: 0
- Team starts: 2
- Team podiums: 0
- Overall titles: 0

Hildegard Embacher (born 10 May 1967) is an Austrian cross-country skier. She competed in three events at the 1988 Winter Olympics.

== Cross-country skiing results ==
All results are sourced from the International Ski Federation (FIS).

=== Olympic Games ===
Year	Age	5 km	10 km	20 km	4 × 5 km relay
1988	20	45	42	50	—

=== World Championships ===
Year	Age	10 km classical	10 km freestyle	15 km	30 km	4 × 5 km relay
1989	21	35	46	—	—	10

=== World Cup ===
==== Season standings ====
Season	Age	Overall
1987	19	NC
1988	20	NC
1989	21	NC
