= Betsy Youngman =

American skier (born 1959)

Personal information
- Born: August 4, 1959 (age 66) Cleveland, Ohio, United States

Sport
- Sport: Skiing

World Cup career
- Seasons: 2 – (1988, 1992)
- Indiv. starts: 5
- Indiv. podiums: 0
- Team starts: 1
- Team podiums: 0
- Overall titles: 0

Betsy Youngman (born August 4, 1959) is an American cross-country skier. She competed at the 1988 Winter Olympics and the 1992 Winter Olympics.

== Cross-country skiing results ==
All results are sourced from the International Ski Federation (FIS).

=== Olympic Games ===
Year	Age	5 km	10 km	15 km	Pursuit	20 km	30 km	4 × 5 km relay
1988	28	47	—	—N/a	—N/a	42	—N/a	—
1992	32	—	—N/a	—	—	—N/a	43	13

=== World Cup ===
==== Season standings ====
Season	Age	Overall
1988	28	NC
1992	32	NC
