= Cornelia Sulzer =

Austrian cross-country skier

Personal information
- Nationality: Austria
- Born: 4 January 1964 (age 62) Admont, Austria

Sport
- Sport: Skiing

World Cup career
- Seasons: 1987–1990, 1992
- Indiv. starts: 10
- Indiv. podiums: 0
- Team starts: 2
- Team podiums: 0
- Overall titles: 0 – (32nd in 1987)

Cornelia Sulzer (born 4 January 1964) is an Austrian cross-country skier. She competed in three events at the 1988 Winter Olympics.

== Cross-country skiing results ==
All results are sourced from the International Ski Federation (FIS).

=== Olympic Games ===
Year	Age	5 km	10 km	20 km	4 × 5 km relay
1988	24	20	26	37	—

=== World Championships ===
Year	Age	10 km classical	10 km freestyle	15 km	30 km	4 × 5 km relay
1989	25	32	—	25	—	10

=== World Cup ===
==== Season standings ====
Season	Age	Overall
1987	23	32
1988	24	NC
1989	25	NC
1990	26	NC
1992	27	NC
