= Ivana Rádlová =

Czech cross-country skier (born 1968)

Ivana Rádlová (born 12 June 1968) is a Czech former cross-country skier who competed for Czechoslovakia in the late 1980s. She finished seventh in the 4 × 5 km relay at the 1988 Winter Olympics in Calgary.

== Cross-country skiing results ==
=== Olympic Games ===
Year	Age	5 km	10 km	20 km	4 × 5 km relay
1988	19	38	DNS	34	7
