= Switzerland at the 1988 Winter Olympics =

- IOC code: SUI
- NOC: Swiss Olympic Association
- Website: www.swissolympic.ch (in German and French)

in Calgary
- Competitors: 70 (56 men, 14 women) in 7 sports
- Flag bearer: Michela Figini (alpine skiing)
- Medals Ranked 3rd: Gold 5 Silver 5 Bronze 5 Total 15

Winter Olympics appearances (overview)
- 1924; 1928; 1932; 1936; 1948; 1952; 1956; 1960; 1964; 1968; 1972; 1976; 1980; 1984; 1988; 1992; 1994; 1998; 2002; 2006; 2010; 2014; 2018; 2022; 2026

Switzerland competed at the 1988 Winter Olympics in Calgary, Alberta, Canada.

== Medalists ==
Medal	Name	Sport	Event	Date
Gold	Pirmin Zurbriggen	Alpine skiing	Men's downhill	15 February
Gold	Vreni Schneider	Alpine skiing	Women's giant slalom	24 February
Gold	Vreni Schneider	Alpine skiing	Women's slalom	26 February
Gold	Ekkehard Fasser; Kurt Meier; Marcel Fässler; Werner Stocker	Bobsleigh	Four-man	28 February
Gold	Hippolyt Kempf	Nordic combined	Individual	28 February
Silver	Peter Müller	Alpine skiing	Men's downhill	15 February
Silver	Brigitte Oertli	Alpine skiing	Women's downhill	19 February
Silver	Brigitte Oertli	Alpine skiing	Women's combined	21 February
Silver	Michela Figini	Alpine skiing	Women's super-G	22 February
Silver	Andreas Schaad; Hippolyt Kempf; Fredy Glanzmann	Nordic combined	Team	24 February
Bronze	Paul Accola	Alpine skiing	Men's combined	17 February
Bronze	Maria Walliser	Alpine skiing	Women's combined	21 February
Bronze	Maria Walliser	Alpine skiing	Women's giant slalom	24 February
Bronze	Pirmin Zurbriggen	Alpine skiing	Men's giant slalom	25 February
Bronze	Andreas Grünenfelder	Cross-country skiing	Men's 50 kilometre freestyle	27 February

== Competitors ==
The following is the list of number of competitors in the Games.

Sport	Men	Women	Total
Alpine skiing	9	8	17
Bobsleigh	10	–	10
Cross-country skiing	6	5	11
Figure skating	1	1	2
Ice hockey	22	–	22
Nordic combined	4	–	4
Ski jumping	4	–	4
Total	56	14	70

== Alpine skiing ==
Men

Athlete	Event	Race 1	Race 2	Total	
Athlete	Event	Time	Time	Time	Rank
Franz Heinzer	Downhill			2:03.36	17
Daniel Mahrer	Downhill			2:03.18	12
Peter Müller	Downhill			2:00.14	2nd place, silver medalist(s)
Pirmin Zurbriggen	Downhill			1:59.63	1st place, gold medalist(s)
Martin Hangl	Super-G			DNF	–
Daniel Mahrer	Super-G			DNF	–
Franz Heinzer	Super-G			1:43.32	15
Pirmin Zurbriggen	Super-G			1:41.96	5
Martin Hangl	Giant Slalom	1:07.51	DNF	DNF	–
Joël Gaspoz	Giant Slalom	1:06.70	1:02.87	2:09.57	10
Hans Pieren	Giant Slalom	1:06.46	1:04.22	2:10.68	14
Pirmin Zurbriggen	Giant Slalom	1:05.57	1:02.82	2:08.39	3rd place, bronze medalist(s)
Paul Accola	Slalom	DSQ	–	DSQ	–
Hans Pieren	Slalom	DNF	–	DNF	–
Joël Gaspoz	Slalom	DNF	–	DNF	–
Pirmin Zurbriggen	Slalom	52.05	48.43	1:40.48	7

Men's combined

Athlete	Downhill	Slalom		Total	
Athlete	Time	Time 1	Time 2	Points	Rank
Bernhard Fahner	1:51.78	47.56	45.81	120.45	15
Martin Hangl	1:51.48	DNF	–	DNF	–
Paul Accola	1:51.27	42.58	42.35	48.24	3rd place, bronze medalist(s)
Pirmin Zurbriggen	1:46.90	44.32	DNF	DNF	–

Women

Athlete	Event	Race 1	Race 2	Total	
Athlete	Event	Time	Time	Time	Rank
Chantal Bournissen	Downhill			1:27.46	11
Michela Figini	Downhill			1:27.26	9
Maria Walliser	Downhill			1:26.89	4
Brigitte Oertli	Downhill			1:26.61	2nd place, silver medalist(s)
Brigitte Oertli	Super-G			1:21.56	17
Zoë Haas	Super-G			1:20.91	7
Maria Walliser	Super-G			1:20.48	6
Michela Figini	Super-G			1:20.03	2nd place, silver medalist(s)
Michela Figini	Giant Slalom	1:02.35	DNF	DNF	–
Corinne Schmidhauser	Giant Slalom	1:00.67	DNF	DNF	–
Maria Walliser	Giant Slalom	1:00.57	1:07.15	2:07.72	3rd place, bronze medalist(s)
Vreni Schneider	Giant Slalom	1:00.53	1:05.96	2:06.49	1st place, gold medalist(s)
Corinne Schmidhauser	Slalom	DNF	–	DNF	–
Brigitte Oertli	Slalom	49.95	DNF	DNF	–
Vreni Schneider	Slalom	48.81	47.88	1:36.69	1st place, gold medalist(s)

Women's combined

Athlete	Downhill	Slalom		Total	
Athlete	Time	Time 1	Time 2	Points	Rank
Beatrice Gafner	DNF	–	–	DNF	–
Brigitte Oertli	1:18.37	39.24	41.47	29.48	2nd place, silver medalist(s)
Vreni Schneider	1:18.10	DNF	–	DNF	–
Maria Walliser	1:16.98	41.80	44.12	51.28	3rd place, bronze medalist(s)

== Bobsleigh ==
Sled	Athletes	Event	Run 1		Run 2		Run 3		Run 4		Total	
Sled	Athletes	Event	Time	Rank	Time	Rank	Time	Rank	Time	Rank	Time	Rank
SUI-1	Hans Hiltebrand; André Kiser	Two-man	58.74	21	59.21	7	59.55	3	59.02	4	3:56.52	6
SUI-2	Gustav Weder; Donat Acklin	Two-man	58.01	11	58.88	3	1:00.12	8	59.05	5	3:56.06	4

Sled	Athletes	Event	Run 1		Run 2		Run 3		Run 4		Total	
Sled	Athletes	Event	Time	Rank	Time	Rank	Time	Rank	Time	Rank	Time	Rank
SUI-1	Ekkehard Fasser; Kurt Meier; Marcel Fässler; Werner Stocker	Four-man	56.83	7	57.37	3	55.88	1	57.43	4	3:47.51	1st place, gold medalist(s)
SUI-2	Hans Hiltebrand; Urs Fehlmann; Erwin Fassbind; André Kiser	Four-man	56.39	2	57.91	12	57.13	15	57.82	6	3:49.25	9

== Cross-country skiing ==
Men

Event	Athlete	Race	
Event	Athlete	Time	Rank
15 km C	Giachem Guidon	DNF	–
15 km C	Konrad Hallenbarter	DNF	–
15 km C	Andi Grünenfelder	45:35.5	35
15 km C	Jürg Capol	43:59.5	22
30 km C	Andi Grünenfelder	DNF	–
30 km C	Jürg Capol	1'31:35.8	30
30 km C	Jeremias Wigger	1'30:47.1	26
30 km C	Giachem Guidon	1'28:05.9	13
50 km F	Markus Fähndrich	2'13:33.2	35
50 km F	Jeremias Wigger	2'09:05.3	14
50 km F	Giachem Guidon	2'09:02.2	13
50 km F	Andi Grünenfelder	2'06:01.9	3rd place, bronze medalist(s)

C = Classical style, F = Freestyle

Men's 4 × 10 km relay

Athletes	Race	
Athletes	Time	Rank
Andi Grünenfelder; Jürg Capol; Giachem Guidon; Jeremias Wigger	1'46:16.3	4

Women

Event	Athlete	Race	
Event	Athlete	Time	Rank
5 km C	Karin Thomas	17:04.1	40
5 km C	Marianne Irniger	16:37.5	35
5 km C	Christina Gilli-Brügger	15:44.5	15
5 km C	Evi Kratzer	15:42.8	14
10 km C	Marianne Irniger	34:58.3	43
10 km C	Sandra Parpan	33:02.0	32
10 km C	Christina Gilli-Brügger	31:37.4	18
10 km C	Evi Kratzer	31:16.7	11
20 km F	Marianne Irniger	1'01:51.5	30
20 km F	Karin Thomas	59:17.2	16
20 km F	Evi Kratzer	58:56.1	14
20 km F	Christina Gilli-Brügger	57:37.4	4

C = Classical style, F = Freestyle

Women's 4 × 5 km relay

Athletes	Race	
Athletes	Time	Rank
Karin Thomas; Sandra Parpan; Evi Kratzer; Christina Gilli-Brügger	1'01:59.4	4

== Figure skating ==
Men

Athlete	CF	SP	FS	TFP	Rank
Oliver Höner	10	10	14	24.0	12

Women

Athlete	CF	SP	FS	TFP	Rank
Stéfanie Schmid	21	16	12	31.0	15

== Ice hockey ==
=== Group A ===
Top three teams (shaded ones) entered the medal round.

	Pld	W	L	T	GF	GA	Pts
Finland	5	3	1	1	22	8	7
Sweden	5	2	0	3	23	10	7
Canada	5	3	1	1	17	12	7
Switzerland	5	3	2	0	19	10	6
Poland	5	1	3	1	9	13	3
France	5	0	5	0	10	47	0

- Switzerland 2-1 Finland
- Canada 4-2 Switzerland
- Sweden 4-2 Switzerland
- Switzerland 4-1 Poland
- Switzerland 9-0 France

=== Game for 7th place ===
Team 1	Score	Team 2
United States	8–4	Switzerland

Team Roster

- Jakob Kölliker
- Patrice Brasey
- André Künzi
- Manuele Celio
- Thomas Vrabec
- Jörg Eberle
- Peter Jaks
- Fredy Lüthi
- Gil Montandon
- Fausto Mazzoleni
- Andreas Ritsch
- Bruno Rogger
- Philipp Neuenschwander
- Gaëtan Boucher
- Felix Hollenstein
- Roman Wäger
- Markus Leuenberger
- Peter Schlagenhauf
- Urs Burkart
- Pietro Cunti
- Olivier Anken
- Richard Bucher

== Nordic combined ==
Men's individual

Events:

- normal hill ski jumping (Best two out of three jumps.)
- 15 km cross-country skiing (Start delay, based on ski jumping results.)

Athlete	Event	Ski Jumping		Cross-country		Total	
Athlete	Event	Points	Rank	Start at	Time	Points	Rank
Stefan Späni	Individual	178.6	40	5:32.7	DNF	DNF	–
Fredy Glanzmann	Individual	180.1	37	5:22.7	45:38.8	376.535	35
Andreas Schaad	Individual	207.2	14	2:22.0	40:40.0	421.350	5
Hippolyt Kempf	Individual	217.9	3	1:10.7	39:27.5	432.230	1st place, gold medalist(s)

Men's Team

Three participants per team.

Events:

- normal hill ski jumping (Three jumps per team member per round, best two rounds counted.)
- 10 km cross-country skiing (Start delay, based on ski jumping results.)

Athletes	Ski jumping		Cross-country		Total
Athletes	Points	Rank	Start at	Time	Rank
Fredy Glanzmann; Hippolyt Kempf; Andreas Schaad	571.4	6	4:52.0	1'20:49.4	2nd place, silver medalist(s)

== Ski jumping ==
Athlete	Event	Jump 1		Jump 2		Total	
Athlete	Event	Distance	Points	Distance	Points	Points	Rank
Christoph Lehmann	Normal hill	74.0	76.0	73.0	74.9	150.9	56
Gérard Balanche	Normal hill	78.0	85.9	78.0	87.9	173.8	37
Christian Hauswirth	Normal hill	79.5	90.3	73.0	74.4	164.7	48
Fabrice Piazzini	Normal hill	83.0	99.9	78.0	88.9	188.8	17
Fabrice Piazzini	Large hill	105.0	73.9	99.0	83.0	156.9	43
Christoph Lehmann	Large hill	101.0	87.3	90.0	65.9	153.2	44
Christian Hauswirth	Large hill	105.0	94.9	97.0	82.2	177.1	27
Gérard Balanche	Large hill	105.0	95.4	94.5	77.2	172.6	30

Men's team large hill

Athletes	Result	
Athletes	Points ^{1}	Rank
Gérard Balanche; Christoph Lehmann; Fabrice Piazzini; Christian Hauswirth	516.1	8

^{1} Four teams members performed two jumps each. The best three were counted.
