= Marie-Andrée Masson =

Canadian cross-country skier

Personal information
- Nationality: Canada
- Born: October 8, 1963 (age 62)

Sport
- Sport: Skiing

World Cup career
- Seasons: 6 – (1983, 1985–1989)
- Indiv. starts: 14
- Indiv. podiums: 0
- Team starts: 2
- Team podiums: 0
- Overall titles: 0 – (30th in 1985)

Marie-Andrée Masson (born 8 October 1963) is a Canadian former cross-country skier who competed in the 1988 Winter Olympics.

== Cross-country skiing results ==
All results are sourced from the International Ski Federation (FIS).

=== Olympic Games ===
Year	Age	5 km	10 km	20 km	4 × 5 km relay
1988	24	—	37	27	9

=== World Championships ===
Year	Age	5 km	10 km classical	10 km freestyle	15 km	20 km	30 km	4 × 5 km relay
1985	21	18	20	—N/a	—N/a	—	—N/a	—
1987	23	—	—	—N/a	—N/a	—	—N/a	7
1989	25	—N/a	34	30	—	—N/a	22	8
1991	25	—	—N/a	41	—	—N/a	41	11

=== World Cup ===
==== Season standings ====
Season	Age	Overall
1983	19	45
1985	21	30
1986	22	51
1987	23	52
1988	24	NC
1989	25	NC
