= Anfisa Reztsova =

Russian skier and biathlete (1964–2023)

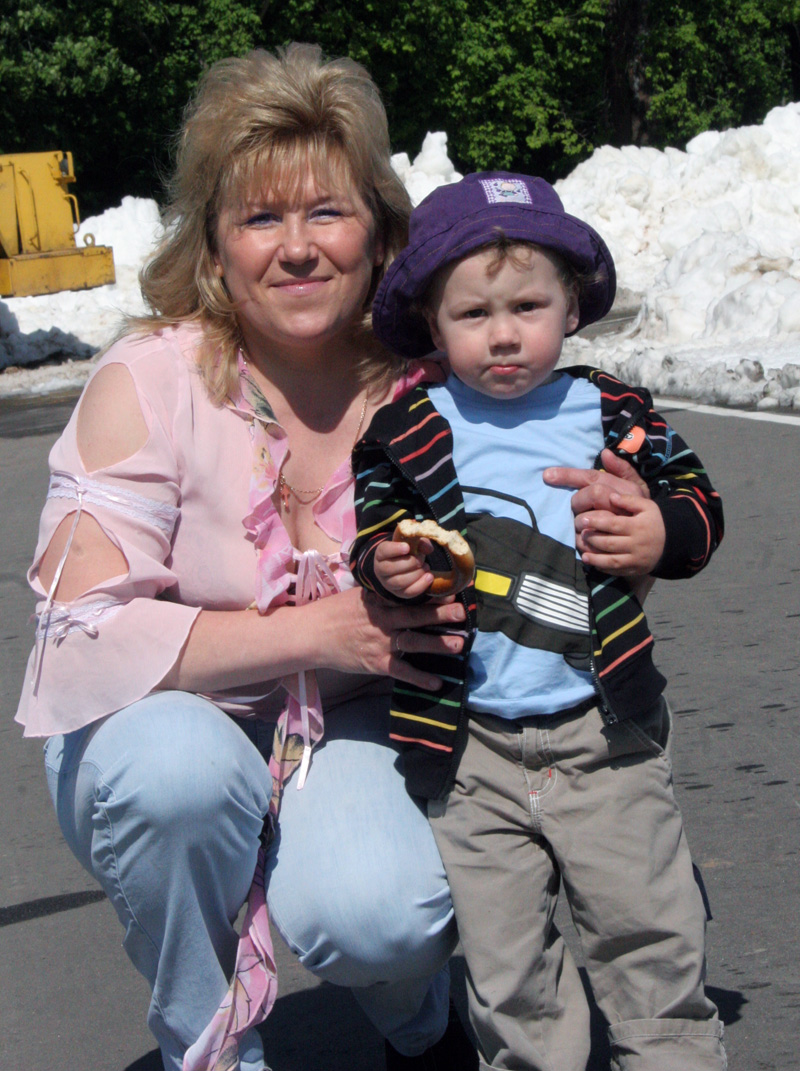
- Reztsova (left) with her grandson in 2009

Personal information
- Born: Anfisa Anatolyevna Romanova; 16 December 1964 Yakimets, Gus-Khrustalny District, Vladimir Oblast, Russian SFSR, Soviet Union
- Died: 19 October 2023 (aged 58)
Medal record
Women's biathlon
Representing Russia
Olympic Games
Gold medal – first place	1994 Lillehammer	4 × 7.5 km relay
Representing the CIS
World Championships
Silver medal – second place	1992 Novosibirsk	4 × 7.5 km relay
Representing the Unified Team
Olympic Games
Gold medal – first place	1992 Albertville	7.5 km sprint
Bronze medal – third place	1992 Albertville	3 × 7.5 km relay
Women's cross-country skiing
Representing Russia
World Championships
Gold medal – first place	1999 Ramsau	4 × 5 km relay
Representing the Soviet Union
Olympic Games
Gold medal – first place	1988 Calgary	4 × 5 km relay
Silver medal – second place	1988 Calgary	20 km freestyle
World Championships
Gold medal – first place	1985 Seefeld	4 × 5 km relay
Gold medal – first place	1987 Oberstdorf	4 × 5 km relay
Silver medal – second place	1987 Oberstdorf	5 km classical
Silver medal – second place	1987 Oberstdorf	20 km freestyle

Anfisa Anatolyevna Reztsova (Russian: Анфиса Анатольевна Резцова, née Romanova, Романова; 16 December 1964 – 19 October 2023) was a Soviet and Russian biathlete and cross-country skier who competed in both sports from 1985 to 2000. In 1992 she became the first female athlete, and as of 2024 only 1 of 2, to win Olympic gold in two separate disciplines.

== Career ==
In Soviet times, she trained at Dynamo in Vladimir.

Reztsova earned a total of five medals in the Winter Olympics, including three golds (1988: cross country 4 × 5 km relay, 1992: biathlon 7.5 km, 1994: biathlon 4 × 7.5 km relay), one silver (1988: cross country 20 km), and one bronze (1992: biathlon 3 × 7.5 km relay). She was notable for performing the feat of being the only person to win Olympic gold medals in both cross-country skiing and biathlon. She was one of the few sportspersons to win gold at three consecutive Olympics under three different flags, the first being the Soviet union in 1988, the second – Unified Team in 1992, and the third being the Russian Federation in 1994.

Reztsova also found success at the FIS Nordic World Ski Championships, earning three golds (4 × 5 km relay: 1985, 1987, 1999) and two silvers (1987: 5 km, 20 km). She also won one cross-country World Cup and seven biathlon World Cups in her career.

In an interview with a Russian sports website in 2020, she admitted to having used illegal performance-enhancing drugs at the end of her career.

During the 2022 Russian invasion of Ukraine, Norwegian biathletes wanted Russian athletes to be excluded from international competitions. This made Reztsova claim that Russian athletes would always be better than the Norwegians, claim that Norwegians just wanted to get rid of competitors, and liken Norwegians to "disgusting cockroaches".

== Personal life and death ==
Reztsova lived in Moscow. She was the mother of biathletes Daria Virolaynen and Kristina Reztsova.

Anfisa Reztsova died of cardiac arrest on 19 October 2023, at the age of 58. Earlier in March 2023 Reztsova had a heart attack and due to low hemoglobin she received several blood transfusions.

== Cross-country skiing results ==
All results are sourced from the International Ski Federation (FIS).

=== Olympic Games ===
- 2 medals – (1 gold, 1 silver)

Year	Age	5 km	10 km	20 km	4 × 5 km relay
1988	23	—	—	Silver	Gold

=== World Championships ===
- 5 medals – (3 gold, 2 silver)

Year	Age	5 km	10 km	15 km	Pursuit	20 km	30 km	4 × 5 km relay
1985	20	—	12	—N/a	—N/a	5	—N/a	Gold
1987	22	Silver	4	—N/a	—N/a	Silver	—N/a	Gold
1999	34	11	—N/a	5	4	—N/a	—	Gold

=== World Cup ===
==== Season standings ====
Season	Age				
Season	Age	Overall	Long Distance	Middle Distance	Sprint
1985	20	6	—N/a	—N/a	—N/a
1986	21	15	—N/a	—N/a	—N/a
1987	22	2nd place, silver medalist(s)	—N/a	—N/a	—N/a
1988	23	13	—N/a	—N/a	—N/a
1999	34	9	8	—N/a	8
2000	35	32	25	38	31

==== Individual podiums ====
- 10 podiums

No.	Season	Date	Location	Race	Level	Place
1	1984–85	14 February 1985	Klingenthal, East Germany	10 km Individual	World Cup	3rd
2	1984–85	18 February 1985	Nové Město, Czechoslovakia	5 km Individual	World Cup	2nd
3	1985–86	7 December 1985	Labrador City, Canada	5 km Individual F	World Cup	2nd
4	1986–87	16 February 1987	Oberstdorf, West Germany	5 km Individual C	World Championships^{[1]}	2nd
5	1986–87	20 February 1987	Oberstdorf, West Germany	20 km Individual F	World Championships^{[1]}	2nd
6	1986–87	28 February 1987	Lahti, Finland	5 km Individual F	World Cup	2nd
7	1986–87	15 March 1987	Kavgolovo, Soviet Union	10 km Individual C	World Cup	2nd
8	1987–88	16 December 1987	(Socialist Federal Republic of Yugoslavia) Bohinj, Yugoslavia	10 km Individual F	World Cup	2nd
9	1987–88	25 February 1988	Calgary, Canada	20 km Individual F	Olympic Games^{[1]}	2nd
10	1998–99	14 February 1999	Seefeld, Austria	5 km Individual F	World Cup	2nd

==== Team podiums ====
- 8 victories
- 11 podiums

No.	Season	Date	Location	Race	Level	Place	Teammates
1	1984–85	22 January 1985	Seefeld, Austria	4 × 5 km Relay	World Championships^{[1]}	1st	Tikhonova / Smetanina / Vasilchenko
2	1986–87	17 February 1987	Oberstdorf, West Germany	4 × 5 km Relay F	World Championships^{[1]}	1st	Ordina / Gavrylyuk / Lazutina
3	1986–87	1 March 1987	Lahti, Finland	4 × 5 Relay C/F	World Cup	1st	Ordina / Lazutina / Välbe
4	1987–88	21 February 1988	Calgary, Canada	4 × 5 km Relay F	Olympic Games^{[1]}	1st	Nageykina / Gavrylyuk / Tikhonova
5	1998–99	29 November 1998	Muonio, Finland	4 × 5 km Relay F	World Cup	1st	Danilova / Lazutina / Gavrylyuk
6	1998–99	20 December 1998	Davos, Switzerland	4 × 5 km Relay C/F	World Cup	3rd	Denisova / Baranova-Masalkina / Chepalova
7	1998–99	10 January 1999	Nové Město, Czech Republic	4 × 5 Relay C/F	World Cup	1st	Nageykina / Gavrylyuk / Chepalova
8	1998–99	26 February 1999	Ramsau, Austria	4 × 5 Relay C/F	World Championships^{[1]}	1st	Danilova / Lazutina / Gavrylyuk
9	1998–99	14 March 1999	Falun, Sweden	4 × 5 km Relay C/F	World Cup	2nd	Gavrylyuk / Yegorova / Skladneva
10	1998–99	21 March 1999	Oslo, Norway	4 × 5 km Relay C	World Cup	2nd	Lazutina / Baranova-Masalkina / Yegorova
11	1999–00	29 November 1999	Kiruna, Sweden	4 × 5 km Relay F	World Cup	1st	Yegorova / Skladneva / Chepalova

Note: ^{1} Until the 1999 World Championships and the 1994 Olympics, World Championship and Olympic races were included in the World Cup scoring system.
