= Dorcas Denhartog =

American cross-country skier (born 1965)

Personal information
- Nationality: United States
- Born: February 3, 1965 (age 61) Madison, Wisconsin, United States

Sport
- Sport: Skiing
- Club: Ford Sayre Ski Club

World Cup career
- Seasons: 5 – (1988–1989, 1992–1994)
- Indiv. starts: 20
- Indiv. podiums: 0
- Team starts: 1
- Team podiums: 0
- Overall titles: 0

Dorcas Denhartog (born February 2, 1965) is a retired American cross-country skier who competed in the late 1980s. She finished eighth in the 4 × 5 km relay at the 1988 Winter Olympics in Calgary.

Denhartog graduated from Middlebury College in 1987, where she won the individual title at the 1985 NCAA Women's Division III Cross Country Championship.

She currently works as a school teacher and amateur cross-country coach.

== Cross-country skiing results ==
All results are sourced from the International Ski Federation (FIS).

=== Olympic Games ===
Year	Age	5 km	10 km	15 km	Pursuit	20 km	30 km	4 × 5 km relay
1988	23	—	40	—N/a	—N/a	23	—N/a	8
1992	27	—	—N/a	44	—	—N/a	45	—
1994	29	—	—N/a	—	—	—N/a	40	—

=== World Championships ===
Year	Age	5 km	10 km classical	10 km freestyle	15 km	Pursuit	30 km	4 × 5 km relay
1989	24	—N/a	—	47	47	—N/a	39	—
1993	28	58	—N/a	—N/a	50	43	52	—

=== World Cup ===
==== Season standings ====
Season	Age	Overall
1988	23	NC
1989	24	NC
1992	27	NC
1993	28	NC
1994	29	NC
