= Nancy Fiddler =

American skier (born 1956)

Personal information
- Nationality: United States
- Born: February 21, 1956 (age 70) Schenectady, New York, United States

Sport
- Sport: Skiing

World Cup career
- Seasons: 6 – (1987–1990, 1992–1993)
- Indiv. starts: 19
- Indiv. podiums: 0
- Team starts: 4
- Team podiums: 0
- Overall titles: 0 – (47th in 1992)

Nancy Fiddler (born February 21, 1956) is an American cross-country skier who competed from 1987 to 1993. Competing in two Winter Olympics, she had her best career finish of eighth in the 4 × 5 km relay at Calgary in 1988 and her best individual finish of 25th in the 5 km event at Albertville in 1992. Fiddler began skiing at Bates College, in Maine. She won 14 national championships during her career.

Fiddler's best finish at the FIS Nordic World Ski Championships was 15th in the 15 km event at Lahti in 1989. Her best World Cup finish was 15th in a 5 km event in Canada in 1991.

Fiddler's lone individual career victory was in a 5 km FIS race in the United States in 1993.

== Cross-country skiing results ==
All results are sourced from the International Ski Federation (FIS).

=== Olympic Games ===
Year	Age	5 km	10 km	15 km	Pursuit	20 km	30 km	4 × 5 km relay
1988	32	41	41	—N/a	—N/a	43	—N/a	8
1992	36	25	—N/a	27	29	—N/a	29	13

=== World Championships ===
Year	Age	5 km	10 km classical	10 km freestyle	15 km	Pursuit	30 km	4 × 5 km relay
1989	33	—N/a	25	23	15	—N/a	19	11
1991	35	18	—N/a	—	20	—N/a	40	12
1993	37	30	—N/a	—N/a	47	DNF	—	8

=== World Cup ===
==== Season standings ====
Season	Age	Overall
1987	31	NC
1988	32	NC
1989	33	50
1990	34	NC
1992	36	47
1993	37	73
