= Susann Kuhfittig =

German skier (born 1965)

Personal information
- Nationality: Germany
- Born: 1 September 1965 (age 60) Zella-Mehlis, East Germany

Sport
- Sport: Skiing

World Cup career
- Seasons: 5 – (1985–1989)
- Indiv. starts: 16
- Indiv. podiums: 1
- Indiv. wins: 0
- Team starts: 3
- Team podiums: 0
- Overall titles: 0 – (17th in 1988)

Susann Kuhfittig (born 1 September 1965) is a German cross-country skier. She competed in three events at the 1988 Winter Olympics.

== Cross-country skiing results ==
All results are sourced from the International Ski Federation (FIS).

=== Olympic Games ===
Year	Age	5 km	10 km	20 km	4 × 5 km relay
1988	22	37	23	38	—

=== World Championships ===
Year	Age	5 km	10 km classical	10 km freestyle	15 km	20 km	30 km	4 × 5 km relay
1987	21	—	—	—N/a	—N/a	—	—N/a	4
1989	23	—N/a	19	—	13	—N/a	40	13

=== World Cup ===
==== Season standings ====
Season	Age	Overall
1985	20	51
1986	21	48
1987	22	18
1988	23	17
1989	24	29

==== Individual podiums ====
- 1 podium

No.	Season	Date	Location	Race	Level	Place
1	1986–87	10 December 1986	Ramsau, Austria	10 km Individual F	World Cup	3rd
