= Carol Gibson =

Canadian cross-country skier

Personal information
- Nationality: Canada
- Born: 15 December 1964 (age 61)

Sport
- Sport: Skiing

World Cup career
- Seasons: 5 – (1983, 1985, 1987–1989)
- Indiv. starts: 7
- Indiv. podiums: 0
- Team starts: 2
- Team podiums: 0
- Overall titles: 0

Carol Gibson (born 15 December 1964) is a Canadian former cross-country skier who competed in the 1988 Winter Olympics.

== Cross-country skiing results ==
=== Olympic Games ===
Year	Age	5 km	10 km	20 km	4 × 5 km relay
1988	23	33	33	26	9

=== World Championships ===
Year	Age	10 km classical	10 km freestyle	15 km	30 km	4 × 5 km relay
1989	24	—	—	—	32	—

=== World Cup ===
==== Season standings ====
Season	Age	Overall
1983	18	NC
1985	20	NC
1987	22	NC
1988	23	NC
1989	24	NC
