= Marie-Helene Östlund =

Swedish cross-country skier

Personal information
- Nationality: Sweden
- Born: 14 May 1966 (age 60) Sollefteå, Sweden
- Spouse: Erik Östlund (m. 1993)

Sport
- Sport: Skiing
- Club: Sollefteå Skidor IF

World Cup career
- Seasons: 10 – (1986–1995)
- Indiv. starts: 60
- Indiv. podiums: 9
- Indiv. wins: 2
- Team starts: 12
- Team podiums: 4
- Team wins: 0
- Overall titles: 0 – (2nd in 1988)
Medal record
Women's cross-country skiing
Representing Sweden
World Championships
Gold medal – first place	1987 Oberstdorf	20 km freestyle
Silver medal – second place	1991 Val di Fiemme	10 km freestyle
Bronze medal – third place	1987 Oberstdorf	4 × 5 km relay
Bronze medal – third place	1995 Thunder Bay	4 × 5 km relay
Junior World Championships
Silver medal – second place	1985 Täsch	3 × 5 km relay

Marie-Helene Östlund (née Westin, born 14 May 1966), is a retired Swedish cross-country skier. Östlund won a world championship title on the 20 km in Oberstdorf, West Germany, in 1987. For the feat, she was awarded the Svenska Dagbladet Gold Medal, shared with the Swedish ice hockey team. Östlund also won the Jerring Award the same year. She is married to fellow Swedish cross-country skier Erik Östlund.

In 1994 and 1995, she won Tjejvasan.

== Cross-country skiing results ==
All results are sourced from the International Ski Federation (FIS).

=== Olympic Games ===
Year	Age	5 km	10 km	15 km	Pursuit	20 km	30 km	4 × 5 km relay
1988	21	7	8	—N/a	—N/a	10	—N/a	6
1992	25	9	—N/a	10	6	—N/a	7	7
1994	27	—	—N/a	17	—	—N/a	12	6

=== World Championships ===
- 4 medals – (1 gold, 1 silver, 2 bronze)

Year	Age	5 km	10 km classical	10 km freestyle	15 km	Pursuit	20 km	30 km	4 × 5 km relay
1987	20	11	11	—N/a	—N/a	—N/a	Gold	—N/a	Bronze
1989	22	—N/a	13	14	—	—N/a	—N/a	9	4
1991	24	9	—N/a	Silver	6	—N/a	—N/a	6	6
1993	26	11	—N/a	—N/a	—	10	—N/a	12	6
1995	28	14	—N/a	—N/a	19	14	—N/a	15	Bronze

=== World Cup ===
==== Season standings ====
Season	Age	Overall
1986	20	28
1987	21	4
1988	22	2nd place, silver medalist(s)
1989	23	27
1990	24	11
1991	25	4
1992	26	8
1993	27	16
1994	28	20
1995	29	13

==== Individual podiums ====
- 2 victories
- 9 podiums

No.	Season	Date	Location	Race	Level	Place
1	1986–87	20 February 1987	Oberstdorf, West Germany	20 km Individual F	World Championships^{[1]}	1st
2	1986–87	15 March 1987	Kavgolovo, Soviet Union	10 km Individual C	World Cup	3rd
3	1987–88	19 December 1987	Reit im Winkl, West Germany	5 km Individual F	World Cup	3rd
4	1987–88	15 January 1988	Toblach, Italy	20 km Individual F	World Cup	3rd
5	1987–88	27 March 1988	Rovaniemi, Finland	10 km Individual F	World Cup	1st
6	1990–91	15 December 1990	Davos, Switzerland	15 km Individual C	World Cup	3rd
7	1990–91	12 January 1991	Klingenthal, Germany	15 km Individual C	World Cup	2nd
8	1990–91	10 February 1991	Val di Fiemme, Italy	10 km Individual F	World Championships^{[1]}	2nd
9	1990–91	16 March 1991	Oslo, Norway	5 km Individual F	World Cup	3rd

==== Team podiums ====
- 4 podiums

No.	Season	Date	Location	Race	Level	Place	Teammates
1	1986–87	17 February 1987	Oberstdorf, West Germany	4 × 5 km Relay F	World Championships^{[1]}	3rd	Wallin / Lamberg-Skog / Dahlman
2	1993–94	13 March 1994	Falun, Sweden	4 × 5 km Relay F	World Cup	3rd	Frithioff / Ordina / Frost
3	1994–95	17 March 1995	Thunder Bay, Canada	4 × 5 km Relay C/F	World Championships^{[1]}	3rd	Frithioff / Ordina / Fanqvist
4	1994–95	26 March 1995	Sapporo, Japan	4 × 5 km Relay C/F	World Cup	3rd	Frithioff / Ordina / Fanqvist

Note: ^{1} Until the 1999 World Championships, World Championship races were included in the World Cup scoring system.

Preceded by Tomas Johansson	Svenska Dagbladet Gold Medal with Swedish national men's ice hockey team 1987	Succeeded by Tomas Gustafson
