= Pierre Harvey =

Canadian sports athlete (born 1957)

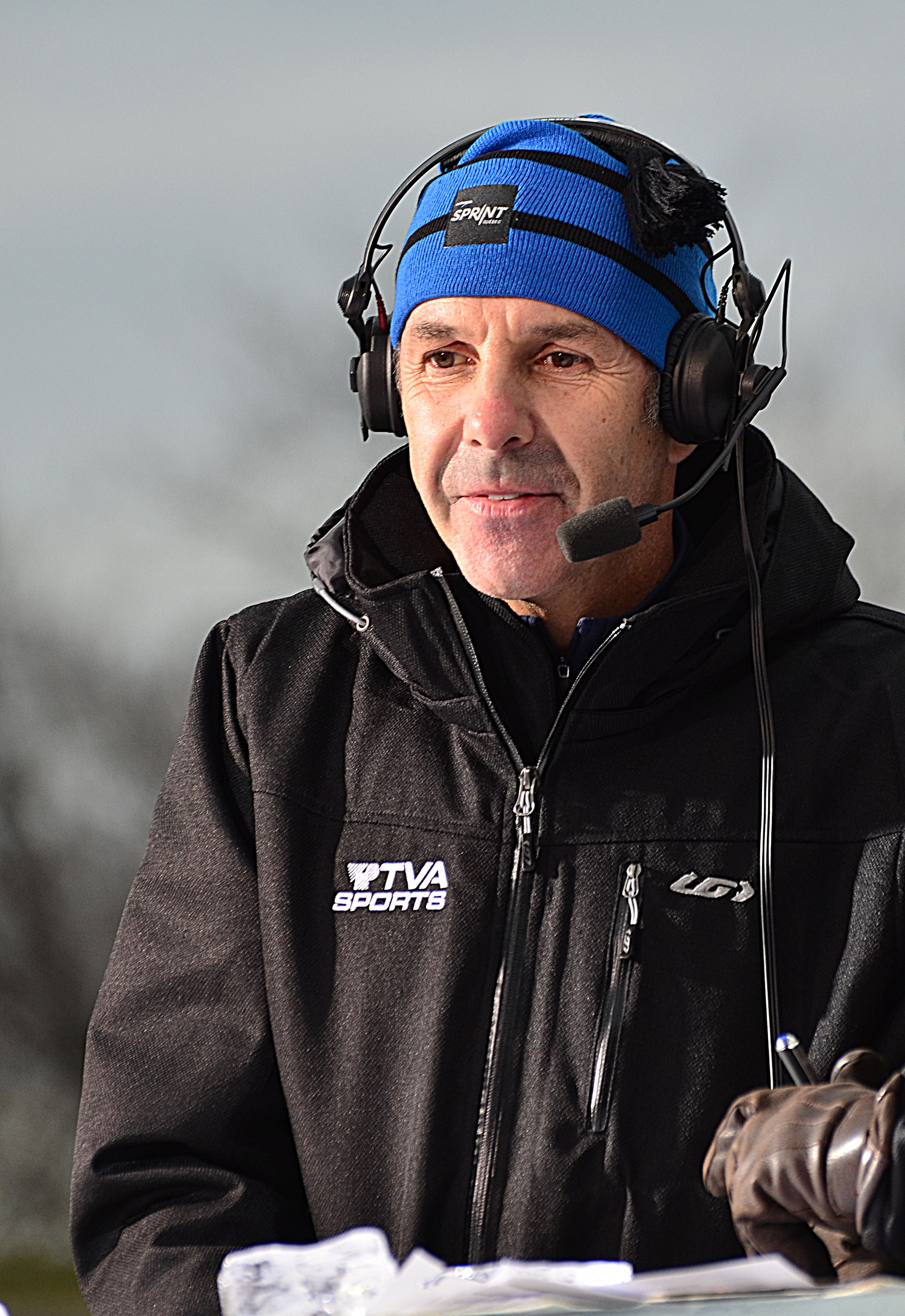
- Pierre Harvey in 2012

Personal information
- Nationality: Canada
- Born: 24 March 1957 (age 69) Rimouski, Quebec, Canada

Sport
- Sport: Skiing
- Club: Rouge et Or de Laval

World Cup career
- Seasons: 7 – (1982–1988)
- Indiv. starts: 36
- Indiv. podiums: 4
- Indiv. wins: 3
- Team starts: 1
- Team podiums: 0
- Overall titles: 0 – (6th in 1988)

Pierre Harvey, CM CQ (born March 24, 1957) is a Canadian sports athlete. He was the first Canadian male athlete to compete in both the 1984 Summer Olympics (road cycling) and 1984 Winter Olympics (cross-country skiing).

== Early life and career ==
Born in Rimouski, Quebec, he won three gold medals in cross-country skiing in the 1979 Canada Winter Games.

First competing as a cyclist at the 1976 Summer Olympics in Montreal, Harvey finished 24th in the individual road race. He was also a silver medallist in the Road Race at the 1978 Commonwealth Games in Edmonton.

Competing in cross-country skiing from 1982 to 1988, Harvey's best finish at the FIS Nordic World Ski Championships was 16th in the 15 km event at Oslo in 1982. He would earn a total of three victories in his career, including a victory in the 50 km event at the Holmenkollen ski festival in 1988. As of 2010, he is the only Canadian to win any event at that prestigious competition.

At the 1984 Los Angeles Olympics, Harvey's job in the cycling road race was to act as wind breaker for his teammate Steve Bauer, who went on to win Olympic silver.

At the 1988 Winter Olympics in Calgary, he took the Athlete's Oath and finished 14th in the 30 km event.

He won the prestigious 54 km Birkebeinerrennet ski marathon in Norway in 1987, the first non-Scandinavian to do so.

== Membership ==
In 1988, he was made a Member of the Order of Canada. In 1992, he was inducted into the Canadian Ski Hall of Fame. Harvey was inducted in the Canadian Cycling Hall of Fame in 2006. In 2011, he was made a Knight of the National Order of Quebec. In 2014, Harvey was inducted into the Canada's Sports Hall of Fame.

His son, Alex Harvey, made the Canadian team for the 2010 Winter Olympics in Vancouver, the 2014 Winter Olympics in Sochi and the 2018 Winter Olympics in Pyeongchang.

== Cross-country skiing results ==
All results are sourced from the International Ski Federation (FIS).

=== Olympic Games ===
Year	Age	15 km	30 km	50 km	4 × 10 km relay
1984	26	21	21	20	—
1988	30	17	14	21	9

=== World Championships ===
Year	Age	15 km	30 km	50 km	4 × 10 km relay
1982	24	16	—	—	—
1985	27	25	22	—	—
1987	29	—	16	—	8

=== World Cup ===
==== Season standings ====
Season	Age	Overall
1982	24	21
1983	25	21
1984	26	33
1985	27	15
1986	28	9
1987	29	7
1988	30	6

==== Individual podiums ====
- 3 victories
- 4 podiums

No.	Season	Date	Location	Race	Level	Place
1	1986–87	7 March 1987	Falun, Sweden	30 km Individual F	World Cup	1st
2	1987–88	15 December 1987	Kastelruth, Italy	30 km Mass Start F	World Cup	3rd
3	1987–88	12 March 1988	Falun, Sweden	30 km Individual F	World Cup	1st
5	1987–88	19 March 1988	Oslo, Norway	50 km Individual F	World Cup	1st

== See also ==
- Université Laval
