= Birgit Kohlrusch =

German skier (born 1965)

Personal information
- Born: 21 December 1965 (age 60) Braunlage, West Germany

Sport
- Sport: Skiing

World Cup career
- Seasons: 2 – (1986, 1988)
- Indiv. starts: 3
- Indiv. podiums: 0
- Team starts: 1
- Team podiums: 0

Birgit Kohlrusch (born 21 December 1965) is a German cross-country skier. She competed in three events at the 1988 Winter Olympics.

== Cross-country skiing results ==
=== Olympic Games ===
| Year | Age | 5 km | 10 km | 20 km | 4 × 5 km relay |
|---|---|---|---|---|---|
| 1988 | 22 | 44 | — | 41 | 11 |

=== World Cup ===
==== Season standings ====
| Season | Age | Overall |
|---|---|---|
| 1986 | 20 | NC |
| 1988 | 22 | NC |
