= Stefanie Birkelbach =

German cross-country skier (born 1967)

Personal information
- Born: 2 May 1967 (age 59) Weidenau, West Germany

Sport
- Sport: Skiing

World Cup career
- Seasons: 1 – (1988)
- Indiv. starts: 2
- Indiv. podiums: 0
- Team starts: 1
- Team podiums: 0

Stefanie Birkelbach (born 2 May 1967) is a German former cross-country skier. She competed in three events at the 1988 Winter Olympics.

== Cross-country skiing results ==
=== Olympic Games ===
Year	Age	5 km	10 km	20 km	4 × 5 km relay
1988	20	43	—	45	11

=== World Cup ===
==== Season standings ====
Season	Age	Overall
1988	20	NC
