= Věra Klimková =

Slovak cross-country skier (born 1957)

Personal information
- Nationality: Slovakia
- Born: Věra Leskovjanská; 11 August 1957 (age 69) Spišská Nová Ves, Czechoslovakia

Sport
- Sport: Skiing

World Cup career
- Seasons: 6 – (1982–1985, 1987–1988)
- Indiv. starts: 16
- Indiv. podiums: 1
- Indiv. wins: 0
- Team starts: 2
- Team podiums: 0
- Overall titles: 0 – (17th in 1985)

Věra Klimková (born Věra Leskovjanská on 11 August 1957) is a Slovak cross-country skier who competed for Czechoslovakia from 1982 to 1988. She finished seventh in the 4 × 5 km relay at the 1988 Winter Olympics in Calgary.

Klimková's best finish at the FIS Nordic World Ski Championships was ninth in the 10 km event at Seefeld in Tirol in 1985. Her best World Cup career finish was fifth in a 5 km event in Czechoslovakia in 1985.

== Cross-country skiing results ==
All results are sourced from the International Ski Federation (FIS).

=== Olympic Games ===
Year	Age	5 km	10 km	20 km	4 × 5 km relay
1984	26	—	—	24	—
1988	30	22	35	17	7

=== World Championships ===
Year	Age	5 km	10 km	20 km	4 × 5 km relay
1985	27	6	9	10	5

=== World Cup ===
==== Season standings ====
Season	Age	Overall
1982	24	61
1983	25	49
1984	26	38
1985	27	17
1987	29	41
1988	30	39

==== Individual podiums ====
- 1 podium

No.	Season	Date	Location	Race	Level	Place
1	1984–85	18 February 1985	Nové Město, Czechoslovakia	5 km Individual	World Cup	3rd
