= Angela Schmidt-Foster =

Canadian cross-country skier

Personal information
- Nationality: Canada
- Born: January 6, 1960 (age 66) Woodstock, Canada

Sport
- Sport: Skiing

World Cup career
- Seasons: 9 – (1982–1984, 1986–1989, 1991–1992)
- Indiv. starts: 28
- Indiv. podiums: 1
- Indiv. wins: 0
- Team starts: 4
- Team podiums: 0
- Overall titles: 0 – (20th in 1987)

Angela Schmidt-Foster (born 6 January 1960) is a Canadian former cross-country skier who competed in the 1980 Winter Olympics, in the 1984 Winter Olympics, in the 1988 Winter Olympics, and in the 1992 Winter Olympics.

== Cross-country skiing results ==
All results are sourced from the International Ski Federation (FIS).

=== Olympic Games ===
Year	Age	5 km	10 km	15 km	Pursuit	20 km	30 km	4 × 5 km relay
1980	20	29	23	—N/a	—N/a	—N/a	—N/a	8
1984	24	39	36	—N/a	—N/a	DNF	—N/a	—
1988	28	32	38	—N/a	—N/a	44	—N/a	9
1992	32	39	—N/a	29	—	—N/a	51	11

=== World Championships ===
Year	Age	5 km	10 km classical	10 km freestyle	15 km	20 km	30 km	4 × 5 km relay
1982	22	—	19	—N/a	—N/a	—	—N/a	—
1987	27	—	14	—N/a	—N/a	—	—N/a	7
1989	29	—N/a	21	—	18	—N/a	—	8
1991	31	17	—N/a	—	18	—N/a	—	11

=== World Cup ===
==== Season standings ====
Season	Age	Overall
1982	22	42
1983	23	31
1984	24	41
1986	26	NC
1987	27	20
1988	28	NC
1989	29	NC
1991	30	NC
1992	31	NC

==== Individual podiums ====
- 1 podium

No.	Season	Date	Location	Race	Level	Place
1	1986–87	10 January 1987	Canmore, Canada	10 km Individual C	World Cup	3rd
