= Sandra Parpan =

Swiss cross-country skier

Personal information
- Nationality: Switzerland
- Born: November 7, 1967 (age 58)

Sport
- Sport: Skiing
- Club: SC Lenzerheide

World Cup career
- Seasons: 3 – (1988–1990)
- Indiv. starts: 4
- Indiv. podiums: 0
- Team starts: 2
- Team podiums: 0
- Overall titles: 0

Sandra Parpan (born 7 November 1967) is a Swiss cross-country skier who competed from 1988 to 2007. She finished fourth in the 4 × 5 km relay at the 1988 Winter Olympics in Calgary.

Parpan later competed in the FIS Marathon Cup, earning her best finish of 28th in Switzerland in 2007.

== Cross-country skiing results ==
All results are sourced from the International Ski Federation (FIS).

=== Olympic Games ===
Year	Age	5 km	10 km	20 km	4 × 5 km relay
1988	20	—	32	—	4

=== World Championships ===
Year	Age	10 km classical	10 km freestyle	15 km	30 km	4 × 5 km relay
1989	21	—	40	37	—	—

=== World Cup ===
==== Season standings ====
Season	Age	Overall
1988	20	NC
1989	21	NC
1990	22	NC
