= Marianne Irniger =

Swiss cross-country skier

Personal information
- Nationality: Switzerland
- Born: 26 October 1966 (age 59)

Sport
- Sport: Skiing

World Cup career
- Seasons: 4 – (1987–1990)
- Indiv. starts: 9
- Indiv. podiums: 0
- Team starts: 3
- Team podiums: 0
- Overall titles: 0 – (35th in 1989)

Marianne Irniger (born 26 October 1966) is a Swiss cross-country skier. She competed in three events at the 1988 Winter Olympics.

== Cross-country skiing results ==
All results are sourced from the International Ski Federation (FIS).

=== Olympic Games ===
Year	Age	5 km	10 km	20 km	4 × 5 km relay
1988	21	35	43	30	—

=== World Championships ===
Year	Age	5 km	10 km classical	10 km freestyle	15 km	20 km	30 km	4 × 5 km relay
1987	20	—	—	—N/a	—N/a	—	—N/a	8
1989	22	—N/a	33	22	—	—N/a	24	7
1991	24	—	—N/a	39	27	—N/a	32	10

=== World Cup ===
==== Season standings ====
Season	Age	Overall
1987	20	NC
1988	21	NC
1989	22	35
1990	23	NC
