= Cross-country skiing at the 1988 Winter Olympics – Women's 5 kilometre classical =

Winter Olympics skiing event

Women's 5km at the XV Olympic Winter Games
- Cross-country skiing
- Venue: Canmore Nordic Centre
- Date: 17 February 1988
- Competitors: 55 from 17 nations
- Winning time: 15:04.0

Medalists
1st place, gold medalist(s)		Marjo Matikainen; Finland
2nd place, silver medalist(s)		Tamara Tikhonova; Soviet Union
3rd place, bronze medalist(s)		Vida Vencienė; Soviet Union

The Women's 5 kilometre cross-country skiing event was part of the cross-country skiing programme at the 1988 Winter Olympics, in Calgary, Canada. It was the seventh appearance of the event. The competition was held on 17 February 1988, at the Canmore Nordic Centre.

== Results ==
Rank	Name	Country	Time
1	Marjo Matikainen	Finland	15:04.0
2	Tamara Tikhonova	Soviet Union	15:05.3
3	Vida Vencienė	Soviet Union	15:11.1
4	Anne Jahren	Norway	15:12.6
5	Marja-Liisa Kirvesniemi	Finland	15:16.7
6	Inger Helene Nybråten	Norway	15:17.7
7	Marie-Helene Westin	Sweden	15:28.9
8	Svetlana Nageykina	Soviet Union	15:29.9
9	Marianne Dahlmo	Norway	15:30.4
10	Raisa Smetanina	Soviet Union	15:35.9
11	Brit Pettersen	Norway	15:36.7
12	Tuulikki Pyykkönen	Finland	15:38.1
13	Simone Opitz	East Germany	15:41.1
14	Evi Kratzer	Switzerland	15:42.8
15	Christina Gilli-Brügger	Switzerland	15:44.5
16	Pirkko Määttä	Finland	15:51.8
17	Anna-Lena Fritzon	Sweden	15:55.6
18	Manuela Di Centa	Italy	15:57.2
19	Kerstin Moring	East Germany	16:01.6
20	Cornelia Sulzer	Austria	16:09.7
21	Marie Johansson	Sweden	16:12.1
22	Viera Klimková	Czechoslovakia	16:14.1
23	Karin Svingstedt	Sweden	16:15.0
24	Klara Angerer	Italy	16:20.4
25	Silke Braun	East Germany	16:22.5
26	Lorna Sasseville	Canada	16:23.3
27	Guidina Dal Sasso	Italy	16:26.4
28	Karin Jäger	West Germany	16:28.0
29	Alžbeta Havrančíková	Czechoslovakia	16:28.3
30	Ľubomíra Balážová	Czechoslovakia	16:30.9
31	Leslie Bancroft-Krichko	United States	16:31.1
32	Angela Schmidt-Foster	Canada	16:32.5
33	Carol Gibson	Canada	16:35.2
34	Maria Theurl	Austria	16:36.7
35	Marianne Irniger	Switzerland	16:37.5
36	Margot Kober	Austria	16:39.2
37	Susann Kuhfittig	East Germany	16:41.9
38	Ivana Rádlová	Czechoslovakia	16:43.6
39	Leslie Thompson	United States	16:58.5
40	Karin Thomas	Switzerland	17:04.1
41	Nancy Fiddler	United States	17:05.4
42	Gabriella Carrel	Italy	17:08.8
43	Stefanie Birkelbach	West Germany	17:09.1
44	Birgit Kohlrusch	West Germany	17:10.3
45	Hildegard Embacher	Austria	17:18.6
46	Jean McAllister	Canada	17:32.4
47	Betsy Youngman	United States	17:32.6
48	Sonja Bilgeri	West Germany	17:33.2
49	Piroska Abos	Spain	17:41.6
50	Davaagiin Enkhee	Mongolia	18:02.2
51	Mihaela Cârstoi	Romania	18:21.6
52	Louise McKenzie	Great Britain	18:41.8
53	Jean Watson	Great Britain	18:54.1
	Ileana Ianoşiu-Hangan	Romania	DNF
	Wang Jinfen	China	DNF
