= Georg Fischer (skier) =

West German cross-country skier and biathlete

Medal record

Men's biathlon

Representing West Germany

World Championships
Silver medal – second place	1989 Feistritz an der Drau	Team event

Georg Fischer (born 10 November 1960 in Kelheim) is a West German cross-country skier and biathlete who competed in the 1980s. He finished seventh in the 4 × 10 km relay at the 1988 Winter Olympics in Calgary.

== Cross-country skiing results ==
=== Olympic Games ===
Year	Age	15 km	30 km	50 km	4 × 10 km relay
1988	27	—	—	34	7
