= Jeremias Wigger =

Swiss cross-country skier

Personal information
- Nationality: Switzerland
- Born: 10 March 1965 (age 61) Hasle, Lucerne, Switzerland

Sport
- Sport: Skiing

World Cup career
- Seasons: 13 – (1986–1998)
- Indiv. starts: 88
- Indiv. podiums: 0
- Team starts: 24
- Team podiums: 1
- Team wins: 0
- Overall titles: 0 – (43rd in 1988, 1994)
- Discipline titles: 0
Medal record
Men's cross-country skiing
Representing Switzerland
Junior World Championships
Bronze medal – third place	1984 Trondheim	3 × 5 km relay

Jeremias Wigger (born 10 March 1965) is a Swiss cross-country skier who competed from 1988 to 1998. His best finish at the Winter Olympics was fourth in the 4 x 10 km at the 1988 Winter Olympics in Calgary and 13th in the 10 km + 15 km combined pursuit at the 1994 Winter Olympics in Lillehammer.

Wigger's best finish at the FIS Nordic World Ski Championships was 19th in the 50 km event at Thunder Bay, Ontario in 1995. His best World Cup finish was 12th in a 30 km event in Italy in 1990.

He is the father of cross-country skier Siri Wigger.

== Cross-country skiing results ==
All results are sourced from the International Ski Federation (FIS).

=== Olympic Games ===
Year	Age	10 km	15 km	Pursuit	30 km	50 km	4 × 10 km relay
1988	23	—N/a	—	—N/a	26	14	4
1994	29	21	—N/a	13	—	16	7
1998	33	49	—N/a	DNS	16	18	6

=== World Championships ===
Year	Age	10 km	15 km classical	15 km freestyle	Pursuit	30 km	50 km	4 × 10 km relay
1987	22	—N/a	—	—N/a	—N/a	—	—	7
1989	24	—N/a	—	44	—N/a	—	—	—
1991	26	—	—N/a	—	—N/a	—	29	7
1993	28	48	—N/a	—N/a	37	—	DNF	9
1995	30	—	—N/a	—N/a	—	41	19	12

=== World Cup ===
==== Season standings ====
Season	Age			
Season	Age	Overall	Long Distance	Sprint
1986	21	NC	—N/a	—N/a
1987	22	NC	—N/a	—N/a
1988	23	43	—N/a	—N/a
1989	24	NC	—N/a	—N/a
1990	25	47	—N/a	—N/a
1991	26	NC	—N/a	—N/a
1992	27	NC	—N/a	—N/a
1993	28	74	—N/a	—N/a
1994	29	43	—N/a	—N/a
1995	30	56	—N/a	—N/a
1996	31	NC	—N/a	—N/a
1997	32	NC	NC	—
1998	33	89	58	—

==== Team podiums ====
- 1 podium

No.	Season	Date	Location	Race	Level	Place	Teammates
1	1986–87	14 December 1986	Cogne, Italy	4 × 10 km Relay F	World Cup	3rd	Ambühl / Guidon / Bovisi
