= Sonja Bilgeri =

German skier (born 1964)

Stefanie Birkelbach
Personal information
- Born: 13 July 1964 (age 62) Balderschwang, West Germany

Sport
- Sport: Skiing

World Cup career
- Seasons: 1 – (1988)
- Indiv. starts: 3
- Indiv. podiums: 0
- Team starts: 1
- Team podiums: 0

Sonja Bilgeri (born 13 July 1964) is a German former cross-country skier. She competed in four events at the 1988 Winter Olympics.

== Cross-country skiing results ==
=== Olympic Games ===
Year	Age	5 km	10 km	20 km	4 × 5 km relay
1988	23	48	44	DNF	11

=== World Cup ===
==== Season standings ====
Season	Age	Overall
1988	23	NC
