= Karin Thomas =

Swiss cross-country skeir

Personal information
- Nationality: Switzerland
- Born: October 3, 1961 (age 64) Brusio, Switzerland

Sport
- Sport: Skiing
- Club: SC Bernina

World Cup career
- Seasons: 5 – (1984–1988)
- Indiv. starts: 22
- Indiv. podiums: 1
- Indiv. wins: 0
- Team starts: 4
- Team podiums: 0
- Overall titles: 0 – (14th in 1987)

Karin Thomas (born 3 October 1961 in Brusio) is a Swiss cross-country skier who competed from 1982 to 1988. She finished sixth in the 4 × 5 km relay at the 1984 Winter Olympics in Sarajevo and fourth in that same event at the 1988 Winter Olympics in Calgary.

At the 1985 FIS Nordic World Ski Championships in Seefeld, Thomas finished 15th in the 10 km event and 18th in the 20 km event. Her best World Cup finish was third in a 20 km event in Italy in 1986.

== Cross-country skiing results ==
All results are sourced from the International Ski Federation (FIS).

=== Olympic Games ===
Year	Age	5 km	10 km	20 km	4 × 5 km relay
1984	22	26	23	22	6
1988	26	40	—	16	4

=== World Championships ===
Year	Age	5 km	10 km	20 km	4 × 5 km relay
1985	23	—	15	18	6
1987	25	—	—	14	—

=== World Cup ===
==== Season standings ====
Season	Age	Overall
1984	22	66
1985	23	30
1986	24	33
1987	25	14
1988	26	32

==== Individual podiums ====
- 1 podium

No.	Season	Date	Location	Race	Level	Place
1	1986–87	20 December 1986	Cogne, Italy	20 km Individual F	World Cup	3rd
