= Christina Gilli-Brügger =

Swiss cross-country skier

Personal information
- Nationality: Switzerland
- Born: July 3, 1956 (age 70) Herlisberg, Switzerland

Sport
- Sport: Skiing

World Cup career
- Seasons: 5 – (1984–1988)
- Indiv. starts: 19
- Indiv. podiums: 0
- Team starts: 3
- Team podiums: 0
- Overall titles: 0 – (21st in 1988)

Christina Gilli-Brügger (born 3 July 1956) is a Swiss cross-country skier who competed from 1984 to 1988. She finished fourth both in the 4 × 5 km relay and in the 20 km events at the 1988 Winter Olympics in Calgary. At the 1984 Winter Olympics in Sarajevo, she finished sixth in the 4 × 5 km relay.

Gilli-Brügger's best finish at the FIS Nordic World Ski Championships was fifth in the 20 km event at Oberstdorf in 1987. Her best World Cup finish was ninth twice (1986, 1988).

== Cross-country skiing results ==
All results are sourced from the International Ski Federation (FIS).

=== Olympic Games ===
| Year | Age | 5 km | 10 km | 20 km | 4 × 5 km relay |
|---|---|---|---|---|---|
| 1984 | 27 | 35 | 20 | DNS | 6 |
| 1988 | 31 | 15 | 18 | 4 | 4 |

=== World Championships ===
| Year | Age | 5 km | 10 km | 20 km | 4 × 5 km relay |
|---|---|---|---|---|---|
| 1987 | 30 | — | — | 5 | 8 |

=== World Cup ===
==== Season standings ====
| Season | Age | Overall |
|---|---|---|
| 1984 | 27 | 60 |
| 1985 | 28 | 27 |
| 1986 | 29 | 44 |
| 1987 | 30 | 24 |
| 1988 | 31 | 21 |
