= Karin Jäger =

German cross-country skier (born 1961)

Personal information
- Born: 31 July 1961 (age 64) Korbach, West Germany

Sport
- Sport: Skiing

World Cup career
- Seasons: 5 – (1982–1985, 1988)
- Indiv. starts: 24
- Indiv. podiums: 1
- Indiv. wins: 0
- Team starts: 1
- Team podiums: 0
- Overall titles: 0 – (8th in 1982)
Medal record
Women's cross-country skiing
Representing West Germany
Junior World Championships
Silver medal – second place	1977; Sainte-Croix	3 × 5 km relay

Karin Jäger (born 31 July 1961) is a German former cross-country skier. She competed at the 1980, 1984 and the 1988 Winter Olympics.

== Cross-country skiing results ==
All results are sourced from the International Ski Federation (FIS).

=== Olympic Games ===
Year	Age	5 km	10 km	20 km	4 × 5 km relay
1980	18	32	26	—N/a	—
1984	22	—	33	19	—
1988	26	28	24	35	11

=== World Championships ===
Year	Age	5 km	10 km	20 km	4 × 5 km relay
1982	20	16	12	10	—

=== World Cup ===
==== Season standings ====
Season	Age	Overall
1982	20	8
1983	21	17
1984	22	21
1985	23	29
1988	26	49

==== Individual podiums ====
- 1 podium

No.	Season	Date	Location	Race	Level	Place
1	1981–82	28 March 1982	Štrbské Pleso, Czechoslovakia	10 km Individual	World Cup	3rd
