= Cross-country skiing at the 1988 Winter Olympics – Women's 20 kilometre freestyle =

Cross-country skiing at the Olympics

Women's 20 km at the XV Olympic Winter Games
- Cross-country skiing
- Venue: Canmore Nordic Centre
- Date: 25 February 1988
- Competitors: 55 from 18 nations
- Winning time: 55:53.6

Medalists
| 1st place, gold medalist(s) | | Tamara Tikhonova; Soviet Union |
| 2nd place, silver medalist(s) | | Anfisa Reztsova; Soviet Union |
| 3rd place, bronze medalist(s) | | Raisa Smetanina; Soviet Union |

The 20 kilometre cross-country skiing event was part of the cross-country skiing programme for women at the 1988 Winter Olympics, in Calgary, Canada. It was the second and final time the event took place at the Olympics, with it being replaced by the 30km event. The competition was held on 25 February 1988 at the Canmore Nordic Centre.

== Results ==
| Rank | Name | Country | Time |
|---|---|---|---|
| 1 | Tamara Tikhonova | Soviet Union | 55:53.6 |
| 2 | Anfisa Reztsova | Soviet Union | 56:12.8 |
| 3 | Raisa Smetanina | Soviet Union | 57:22.1 |
| 4 | Christina Gilli-Brügger | Switzerland | 57:37.4 |
| 5 | Simone Opitz | East Germany | 57:54.3 |
| 6 | Manuela Di Centa | Italy | 57:55.2 |
| 7 | Kerstin Moring | East Germany | 58:17.2 |
| 8 | Marianne Dahlmo | Norway | 58:31.1 |
| 9 | Anna-Lena Fritzon | Sweden | 58:37.4 |
| 10 | Marie-Helene Westin | Sweden | 58:39.4 |
| 11 | Marja-Liisa Kirvesniemi | Finland | 58:45.6 |
| 12 | Marjo Matikainen | Finland | 58:50.7 |
| 13 | Alžbeta Havrančíková | Czechoslovakia | 58:51.4 |
| 14 | Evi Kratzer | Switzerland | 58:56.1 |
| 15 | Simone Greiner-Petter | East Germany | 59:01.2 |
| 16 | Karin Thomas | Switzerland | 59:17.2 |
| 17 | Viera Klimková | Czechoslovakia | 59:22.5 |
| 18 | Marit Elveos | Norway | 59:33.2 |
| 19 | Guidina Dal Sasso | Italy | 59:40.4 |
| 20 | Anette Bøe | Norway | 59:45.8 |
| 21 | Lis Frost | Sweden | 59:59.6 |
| 22 | Karin Lamberg-Skog | Sweden | 1:00:34.6 |
| 23 | Dorcas DenHartog-Wonsavage | United States | 1:00:48.6 |
| 24 | Marit Wold | Norway | 1:00:55.0 |
| 25 | Leslie Thompson | United States | 1:01:04.1 |
| 26 | Carol Gibson | Canada | 1:01:12.0 |
| 27 | Marie-Andrée Masson | Canada | 1:01:12.6 |
| 28 | Jaana Savolainen | Finland | 1:01:26.8 |
| 29 | Stefania Belmondo | Italy | 1:01:36.9 |
| 30 | Marianne Irniger | Switzerland | 1:01:51.5 |
| 31 | Jean McAllister | Canada | 1:02:02.8 |
| 32 | Eija Hyytiäinen | Finland | 1:02:06.9 |
| 33 | Ľubomíra Balážová | Czechoslovakia | 1:02:25.0 |
| 34 | Ivana Rádlová | Czechoslovakia | 1:02:25.4 |
| 35 | Karin Jäger | West Germany | 1:02:34.6 |
| 36 | Elena Desderi | Italy | 1:02:54.8 |
| 37 | Cornelia Sulzer | Austria | 1:03:01.2 |
| 38 | Susann Kuhfittig | East Germany | 1:03:05.8 |
| 39 | Rodica Drăguş | Romania | 1:03:06.0 |
| 40 | Madonna Harris | New Zealand | 1:03:09.6 |
| 41 | Birgit Kohlrusch | West Germany | 1:03:16.2 |
| 42 | Betsy Youngman | United States | 1:03:31.3 |
| 43 | Nancy Fiddler | United States | 1:03:57.5 |
| 44 | Angela Schmidt-Foster | Canada | 1:04:21.9 |
| 45 | Stefanie Birkelbach | West Germany | 1:04:40.5 |
| 46 | Adina Țuțulan-Șotropa | Romania | 1:05:48.6 |
| 47 | Tang Yuqin | China | 1:06:50.1 |
| 48 | Mihaela Cârstoi | Romania | 1:06:59.5 |
| 49 | Piroska Abos | Spain | 1:07:33.1 |
| 50 | Hildegard Embacher | Austria | 1:07:35.1 |
| 51 | Davaagiin Enkhee | Mongolia | 1:08:14.5 |
| 52 | Louise McKenzie | Great Britain | 1:11:07.3 |
| | Margot Kober | Austria | DNF |
| | Sonja Bilgeri | West Germany | DNF |
| | Nina Gavrylyuk | Soviet Union | DSQ |
