= Walter Kuss =

German cross-country skier (born 1965)

Personal information
- Nationality: Germany
- Born: 7 May 1965 (age 61) Furtwangen im Schwarzwald, West Germany

Sport
- Sport: Skiing

World Cup career
- Seasons: 7 – (1988–1994)
- Indiv. starts: 21
- Indiv. podiums: 0
- Team starts: 4
- Team podiums: 0
- Overall titles: 0 – (40th in 1989)

Walter Kuss (born 7 May 1965 in Furtwangen) is a German cross-country skier who competed from 1988 to 1995. He finished seventh in the 4 × 10 km relay at the 1988 Winter Olympics in Calgary, Alberta, Canada.

Kuss' best finish at the FIS Nordic World Ski Championships was 11th in the 15 km event at Lahti in 1989. His best World Cup finish was 13th in a 15 km event in Switzerland in 1990.

Kuss's best individual career finish was second in a 10 km Continental Cup event in Switzerland in 1994.

== Cross-country skiing results ==
All results are sourced from the International Ski Federation (FIS).

=== Olympic Games ===
Year	Age	15 km	30 km	50 km	4 × 10 km relay
1988	22	27	—	DNF	7

=== World Championships ===
Year	Age	10 km	15 km classical	15 km freestyle	Pursuit	30 km	50 km	4 × 10 km relay
1987	21	—N/a	—	—N/a	—N/a	—	—	11
1989	23	—N/a	11	32	—N/a	—	14	10
1993	27	—	—N/a	—N/a	—	22	24	5

=== World Cup ===
==== Season standings ====
Season	Age	Overall
1988	22	NC
1989	23	40
1990	24	NC
1991	25	48
1992	26	NC
1993	27	61
1994	28	NC
