= Jean Watson (cross-country skier) =

British cross-country skier (born 1960)

Personal information
- Nationality: British
- Born: 29 October 1960 (age 64); County Durham, England

Sport
- Sport: Cross-country skiing

Jean Watson (born 29 October 1960) is a British cross-country skier. She competed in two events at the 1988 Winter Olympics.
