= Michael Sperr =

German bobsledder

Personal information
- Nationality: German
- Born: 8 September 1962 (age 62); Munich, West Germany

Sport
- Sport: Bobsleigh

Michael Sperr (born 8 September 1962) is a German bobsledder. He competed in the two man and the four man events at the 1988 Winter Olympics.
