= Rolf Müller (bobsleigh) =

German bobsledder

Personal information
- Nationality: German
- Born: 4 August 1961 (age 65) Weidenau, West Germany

Sport
- Sport: Bobsleigh

Rolf Müller (born 4 August 1961) is a German bobsledder. He competed in the two man and the four man events at the 1988 Winter Olympics.
