= Evi Kratzer =

Swiss cross-country skier

Personal information
- Nationality: Switzerland
- Born: 24 January 1961 (age 65) Arvigo, Switzerland

Sport
- Sport: Skiing

World Cup career
- Seasons: 8 – (1982–1989)
- Indiv. starts: 52
- Indiv. podiums: 4
- Indiv. wins: 1
- Team starts: 5
- Team podiums: 0
- Overall titles: 0 – (5th in 1985)
Medal record
Women's cross-country skiing
Representing Switzerland
World Championships
Bronze medal – third place	1987 Oberstdorf	5 km classical

Evi Kratzer (born January 24, 1961, in Arvigo) is a former Swiss cross-country skier who competed from 1982 to 1989. She earned a bronze medal in the 5 km at the 1987 FIS Nordic World Ski Championships in Oberstdorf.

Kratzer's best individual finish at the Winter Olympics was 8th in the 20 km at Sarajevo in 1984. Her only individual victory was at a 10 km event in Calgary in 1987.

== Cross-country skiing results ==
All results are sourced from the International Ski Federation (FIS).

=== Olympic Games ===
Year	Age	5 km	10 km	20 km	4 × 5 km relay
1980	19	23	27	—N/a	—
1984	23	9	11	8	6
1988	27	14	11	14	4

=== World Championships ===
- 1 medal – (1 bronze)

Year	Age	5 km	10 km classical	10 km freestyle	15 km	20 km	30 km	4 × 5 km relay
1982	21	11	14	—N/a	—N/a	14	—N/a	—
1985	24	9	14	—N/a	—N/a	15	—N/a	6
1987	26	Bronze	10	—N/a	—N/a	11	—N/a	8
1989	28	—N/a	20	—	19	—N/a	17	7

=== World Cup ===
==== Season standings ====
Season	Age	
Season	Age	Overall
1982	21	14
1983	22	13
1984	23	15
1985	24	5
1986	25	6
1987	26	7
1988	27	21
1989	28	48

==== Individual podiums ====
- 1 victory
- 4 podiums

No.	Season	Date	Location	Race	Level	Place
1	1984–85	18 December 1984	Davos, Switzerland	10 km Individual	World Cup	3rd
2	1984–85	23 February 1985	Syktyvkar, Soviet Union	20 km Individual	World Cup	2nd
3	1986–87	10 January 1987	Canmore, Canada	10 km Individual C	World Cup	1st
4	1986–87	16 February 1987	Oberstdorf, West Germany	5 km Individual C	World Championships^{[1]}	3rd

Note: ^{1} Until the 1999 World Championships, World Championship races were included in the World Cup scoring system.
