= Rodica Drăguș =

Romanian cross-country skier (born 1964)

Personal information
- Nationality: Romanian
- Born: 28 October 1964 (age 60)

Sport
- Sport: Cross-country skiing

Rodica Drăguș (born 28 October 1964) is a Romanian cross-country skier. She competed in three events at the 1988 Winter Olympics.
