= Cross-country skiing at the 1988 Winter Olympics – Women's 10 kilometre classical =

Winter Olympics skiing event

Women's 10km at the XV Olympic Winter Games
- Cross-country skiing
- Venue: Cross Country Skiing Stadium
- Date: 14 February 1988
- Competitors: 52 from 17 nations
- Winning time: 30:08.3

Medalists
1st place, gold medalist(s)		Vida Vencienė; Soviet Union
2nd place, silver medalist(s)		Raisa Smetanina; Soviet Union
3rd place, bronze medalist(s)		Marjo Matikainen; Finland

The Women's 10 kilometre cross-country skiing event was part of the cross-country skiing programme at the 1988 Winter Olympics, in Calgary, Canada. It was the tenth appearance of the event. The competition was held on 14 February 1988, at the Canmore Nordic Centre.

== Results ==
Rank	Name	Country	Time
1	Vida Vencienė	Soviet Union	30:08.3
2	Raisa Smetanina	Soviet Union	30:17.0
3	Marjo Matikainen	Finland	30:20.5
4	Svetlana Nageykina	Soviet Union	30:26.5
5	Tamara Tikhonova	Soviet Union	30:38.9
6	Inger Helene Nybråten	Norway	30:51.7
7	Pirkko Määttä	Finland	30:52.4
8	Marie-Helene Westin	Sweden	30:53.5
9	Marja-Liisa Kirvesniemi	Finland	30:57.0
10	Simone Opitz	East Germany	31:14.3
11	Evi Kratzer	Switzerland	31:16.7
12	Guidina Dal Sasso	Italy	31:16.7
13	Anna-Lena Fritzon	Sweden	31:19.3
14	Brit Pettersen	Norway	31:20.5
15	Marit Wold	Norway	31:31.6
16	Anne Jahren	Norway	31:34.1
17	Bice Vanzetta	Italy	31:34.5
18	Christina Gilli-Brügger	Switzerland	31:37.4
19	Stefania Belmondo	Italy	31:47.2
20	Manuela Di Centa	Italy	31:50.2
21	Simone Greiner-Petter	East Germany	31:53.0
22	Karin Svingstedt	Sweden	31:57.0
23	Susann Kuhfittig	East Germany	32:01.5
24	Karin Jäger	West Germany	32:09.5
25	Kerstin Moring	East Germany	32:12.8
26	Cornelia Sulzer	Austria	32:17.1
27	Ľubomíra Balážová	Czechoslovakia	32:30.3
28	Annika Dahlman	Sweden	32:31.4
29	Tuulikki Pyykkönen	Finland	32:37.7
30	Lorna Sasseville	Canada	32:49.7
31	Alžbeta Havrančíková	Czechoslovakia	32:59.1
32	Sandra Parpan	Switzerland	33:02.0
33	Carol Gibson	Canada	33:03.9
34	Margot Kober	Austria	33:22.2
35	Viera Klimková	Czechoslovakia	33:23.0
36	Leslie Bancroft-Krichko	United States	33:25.1
37	Marie-Andrée Masson	Canada	33:35.6
38	Angela Schmidt-Foster	Canada	33:45.9
39	Rodica Drăguş	Romania	33:51.4
40	Dorcas DenHartog-Wonsavage	United States	34:26.1
41	Nancy Fiddler	United States	34:31.1
42	Hildegard Embacher	Austria	34:53.2
43	Marianne Irniger	Switzerland	34:58.3
44	Sonja Bilgeri	West Germany	35:07.0
45	Leslie Thompson	United States	35:17.7
46	Piroska Abos	Spain	35:17.8
47	Adina Țuțulan-Șotropa	Romania	35:31.1
48	Davaagiin Enkhee	Mongolia	35:40.8
49	Louise McKenzie	Great Britain	36:58.7
50	Jean Watson	Great Britain	37:54.0
51	Wang Jinfen	China	38:47.7
52	Maria Theurl	Austria	DNF
