= Louise McKenzie =

British skier (born 1964)

Personal information
- Nationality: British
- Born: 31 March 1964 (age 60); Grantown-on-Spey, Scotland
- Height: 5 ft 4 1/2 in (164 cm)
- Weight: 130 lb (59 kg)

Sport
- Sport: Cross-country skiing

Louise McKenzie (born 31 March 1964) is a British cross-country skier. She competed in three events at the 1988 Winter Olympics.
