= Piroska Abos =

Spanish skier (born 1962)

Personal information
- Nationality: Spanish
- Born: 13 July 1962 (age 62); Frumoasa, Romania

Sport
- Sport: Cross-country skiing

Piroska Abos Gvorgyzakab (born 13 July 1962) is a Spanish cross-country skier. She competed in the 1988 Winter Olympics.
