= Kerstin Mohring =

German cross-country skier (born 1963)

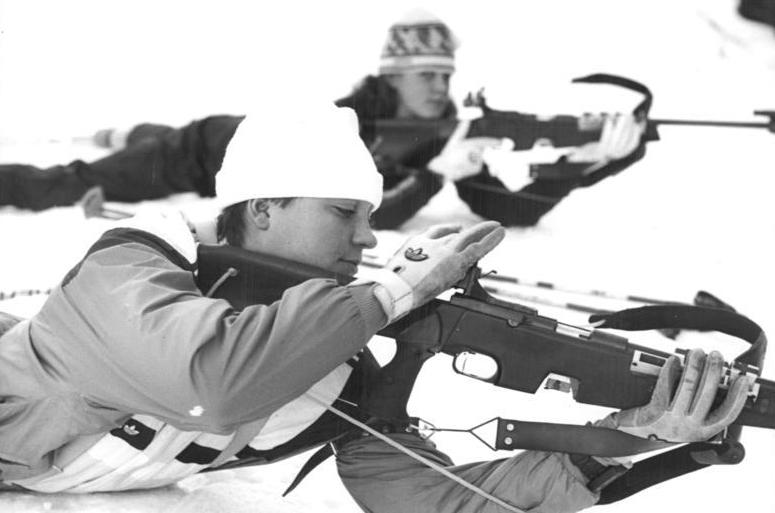
- Kerstin Mohring (in front)

Personal information
- Nationality: German
- Born: 26 September 1963 (age 61); Hasselfelde, East Germany
- Spouse: Jochen Pietzsch

Sport
- Sport: Cross-country skiing

Kerstin Mohring (born 26 September 1963) is a former East German cross-country skier who competed from 1988 to 1989. At the 1988 Winter Olympics in Calgary, she finished fifth in the 4 x 5 km relay and seventh in the 20 km event.

Mohring's best World Cup finish was fifth in a 30 km event in Norway in 1988. She married luger Jochen Pietzsch. Her father, Werner Moring (1927–1995), represented Germany in cross-country skiing at the 1956 Winter Olympics.
