= Cross-country skiing at the 1988 Winter Olympics – Women's 4 × 5 kilometre relay =

Women's 4 × 5 kilometre relay at the XV Olympic Winter Games
- Cross-country skiing
- Venue: Cross Country Skiing Stadium
- Date: 21 February 1988
- Competitors: 48 from 12 nations
- Winning time: 59:51.1

Medalists
1st place, gold medalist(s)		Svetlana Nageykina; Nina Gavrylyuk; Tamara Tikhonova; Anfisa Reztsova	Soviet Union
2nd place, silver medalist(s)		Trude Dybendahl; Marit Wold; Anne Jahren; Marianne Dahlmo	Norway
3rd place, bronze medalist(s)		Pirkko Määttä; Marja-Liisa Kirvesniemi; Marjo Matikainen; Jaana Savolainen	Finland

The Women's 4 × 5 kilometre relay cross-country skiing event was part of the cross-country skiing programme at the 1988 Winter Olympics, in Calgary, Canada. It was the ninth appearance of the women's relay event. The competition was held on 21 February 1988, at the Canmore Nordic Centre.

== Results ==
Rank	Bib	Name	Country	Time
1	4	Svetlana Nageykina; Nina Gavrylyuk; Tamara Tikhonova; Anfisa Reztsova	Soviet Union	59:51.1
2	1	Trude Dybendahl; Marit Wold; Anne Jahren; Marianne Dahlmo	Norway	1:01:33.0
3	3	Pirkko Määttä; Marja-Liisa Kirvesniemi; Marjo Matikainen; Jaana Savolainen	Finland	1:01:53.8
4	6	Karin Thomas; Sandra Parpan; Evi Kratzer; Christina Gilli-Brügger	Switzerland	1:01:59.4
5	8	Kerstin Moring; Simone Opitz; Silke Braun; Simone Greiner-Petter	East Germany	1:02:19.9
6	5	Lis Frost; Anna-Lena Fritzon; Karin Lamberg-Skog; Marie-Helene Westin	Sweden	1:02:24.9
7	2	Ľubomíra Balážová; Viera Klimková; Ivana Rádlová; Alžbeta Havrančíková	Czechoslovakia	1:03:37.1
8	7	Dorcas DenHartog-Wonsavage; Leslie Thompson; Nancy Fiddler; Leslie Bancroft-Krichko	United States	1:04:08.8
9	11	Angela Schmidt-Foster; Carol Gibson; Lorna Sasseville; Marie-Andrée Masson	Canada	1:04:22.6
10	9	Klara Angerer; Guidina Dal Sasso; Elena Desderi; Stefania Belmondo	Italy	1:04:23.6
11	12	Stefanie Birkelbach; Karin Jäger; Birgit Kohlrusch; Sonja Bilgeri	West Germany	1:05:48.6
12	10	Ileana Ianoşiu-Hangan; Mihaela Cârstoi; Adina Țuțulan-Șotropa; Rodica Drăguş	Romania	1:10:59.9
