= 1986–87 FIS Cross-Country World Cup =

Cross-country skiing competition

Discipline	Men	Women
Overall	(Sweden) Torgny Mogren	(Finland) Marjo Matikainen (2nd title)
Nations Cup	Sweden	Norway
- Nations Cup Overall: Sweden

Competition
Locations	9 venues	9 venues
Individual	11 events	11 events
Relay/Team	6 events	6 events

The 1986–87 FIS Cross-Country World Cup was the 6th official World Cup season in cross-country skiing for men and women. The World Cup started in Ramsau, Austria, on 10 December 1986 and finished in Oslo, Norway, on 15 March 1987. Torgny Mogren of Sweden won the overall men's cup and Marjo Matikainen of Finland won the women's.

== Calendar ==
=== Men ===
C – Classic / F – Freestyle
No.	Date	Venue	Event	Winner	Second	Third	Ref.
1	10 December 1986	(Austria) Ramsau	15 km F	(Sweden) Gunde Svan	(Finland) Kari Ristanen	(Norway) Vegard Ulvang	
2	13 December 1986	(Italy) Cogne	15 km F	(Sweden) Gunde Svan	(Sweden) Torgny Mogren	(Soviet Union) Vladimir Smirnov	
3	20 December 1986	(Switzerland) Davos	30 km C	(Sweden) Thomas Eriksson	(Soviet Union) Vladimir Smirnov	(Sweden) Christer Majbäck	
4	10 January 1987	(Canada) Calgary	15 km C	(Finland) Harri Kirvesniemi	(Sweden) Torgny Mogren	(Sweden) Christer Majbäck	
FIS Nordic World Ski Championships 1987
5	12 February 1987	(West Germany) Oberstdorf	30 km C *	(Sweden) Thomas Wassberg	(Finland) Aki Karvonen	(Sweden) Christer Majbäck	
6	15 February 1987	(West Germany) Oberstdorf	15 km C *	(Italy) Marco Albarello	(Sweden) Thomas Wassberg	(Soviet Union) Mikhail Devyatyarov	
7	21 February 1987	(West Germany) Oberstdorf	50 km F *	(Italy) Maurilio De Zolt	(Sweden) Thomas Wassberg	(Sweden) Torgny Mogren	
8	1 March 1987	(Finland) Lahti	30 km F	(Soviet Union) Alexey Prokurorov	(Sweden) Torgny Mogren	(Italy) Albert Walder	
9	7 March 1987	(Sweden) Falun	30 km F	(Canada) Pierre Harvey	(Soviet Union) Alexey Prokurorov	(Sweden) Torgny Mogren	
10	14 March 1987	(Soviet Union) Kavgolovo	15 km C	(Sweden) Torgny Mogren	(Norway) Vegard Ulvang	(Norway) Pål Gunnar Mikkelsplass	
11	21 March 1987	(Norway) Holmenkollen	50 km C	(Sweden) Thomas Wassberg	(Norway) Per Knut Aaland	(Sweden) Thomas Eriksson	

=== Women ===
C – Classic / F – Freestyle
No.	Date	Venue	Event	Winner	Second	Third	Ref.
1	10 December 1986	(Austria) Ramsau	10 km F	(Norway) Marianne Dahlmo	(Soviet Union) Natalia Furletova	(East Germany) Susann Kuhfittig	
2	13 December 1986	(Italy) Val di Sole	5 km C	(Norway) Brit Pettersen	(Sweden) Marie Johansson	(Norway) Grete Ingeborg Nykkelmo	
3	20 December 1986	(Italy) Cogne	20 km F	(Norway) Grete Ingeborg Nykkelmo	(Norway) Marianne Dahlmo	(Switzerland) Karin Thomas	
4	10 January 1987	(Canada) Calgary	10 km C	(Switzerland) Evi Kratzer	(Sweden) Annika Dahlman	(Canada) Angela Schmidt-Foster	
FIS Nordic World Ski Championships 1987
5	13 February 1987	(West Germany) Oberstdorf	10 km C *	(Norway) Anne Jahren	(Finland) Marjo Matikainen	(Norway) Brit Pettersen	
6	16 February 1987	(West Germany) Oberstdorf	5 km C *	(Finland) Marjo Matikainen	(Soviet Union) Anfisa Reztsova	(Switzerland) Evi Kratzer	
7	20 February 1987	(West Germany) Oberstdorf	20 km F *	(Sweden) Marie-Helene Westin	(Soviet Union) Anfisa Reztsova	(Soviet Union) Larisa Lazutina	
8	28 February 1987	(Finland) Lahti	5 km F	(Finland) Marjo Matikainen	(Soviet Union) Anfisa Reztsova	(Soviet Union) Antonina Ordina	
9	7 March 1987	(Sweden) Falun	30 km F	(Norway) Anette Bøe	(Finland) Marjo Matikainen	(Norway) Marianne Dahlmo	
10	15 March 1987	(Soviet Union) Kavgolovo	10 km C	(Finland) Marjo Matikainen	(Soviet Union) Anfisa Reztsova	(Sweden) Marie-Helene Westin	
11	21 March 1987	(Norway) Holmenkollen	20 km C	(Norway) Brit Pettersen	(Soviet Union) Raisa Smetanina	(Norway) Anne Jahren	

=== Men's team events ===
WC	Date	Place	Discipline	Winner	Second	Third	Ref.
1	14 December 1986	(Italy) Cogne	4 × 10 km relay F	Sweden Thomas Wassberg; Thomas Eriksson; Gunde Svan; Torgny Mogren	Norway Martin Hole; Torgeir Bjørn; Vegard Ulvang; Geir Holte	Switzerland Jeremias Wigger; Joos Ambühl; Giachem Guidon; Battista Bovisi	
2	21 December 1986	(Switzerland) Davos	4 × 10 km relay F	Sweden Erik Östlund; Thomas Eriksson; Torgny Mogren; Gunde Svan	Finland	Switzerland	
3	11 January 1987	(Canada) Calgary	4 × 10 km relay F	Sweden Erik Östlund; Christer Majbäck; Gunde Svan; Torgny Mogren	Switzerland Battista Bovisi; Markus König; Christian Marchon; Giachem Guidon	Finland Jari Laukkanen; Marko Mehtonen; Harri Kirvesniemi; Jari Rasanen	
4	17 February 1987	(West Germany) Oberstdorf	4 × 10 km relay F *	Sweden Erik Östlund; Gunde Svan; Thomas Wassberg; Torgny Mogren	Soviet Union Oleksandr Batyuk; Vladimir Smirnov; Mikhail Devyatyarov; Vladimir Sakhnov	Norway Ove Aunli; Vegard Ulvang; Pål Gunnar Mikkelsplass; Terje Langli	
5	8 March 1987	(Sweden) Falun	4 × 10 km relay C	Sweden Erik Östlund; Torgny Mogren; Thomas Wassberg; Christer Majbäck	Soviet Union Oleksandr Batyuk; Vladimir Sakhnov; Alexander Uschkalenko; Alexey Prokurorov	Norway Pål Gunnar Mikkelsplass; Vegard Ulvang; Ove Aunli; Terje Langli	
6	19 March 1987	(Norway) Holmenkollen	4 × 10 km relay C	Sweden Jan Ottosson; Thomas Wassberg; Torgny Mogren; Thomas Eriksson	Finland Jari Laukkanen; Harri Kirvesniemi; Kari Ristanen; Aki Karvonen	Italy Maurilio De Zolt; Giorgio Vanzetta; Marco Albarello; Giuseppe Pulie	

=== Women's team events ===
C – Classic / F – Freestyle
WC	Date	Place	Discipline	Winner	Second	Third	Ref.
1	14 December 1986	(Italy) Val di Sole	4 × 5 km relay C	Norway Marianne Dahlmo; Grete Ingeborg Nykkelmo; Brit Pettersen; Berit Aunli	Soviet Union	Sweden	
2	20 December 1986	(Italy) Cogne	4 × 5 km relay F	Norway Grete Ingeborg Nykkelmo; Marit Elveos; Anne Jahren; Anette Bøe	Czechoslovakia Anna Janoušková; Alžbeta Havrančíková; Věra Klimková; Marcela Jebavá	Sweden	
3	11 January 1987	(Canada) Calgary	4 × 5 km relay F	Sweden Ing Marie Carlström; Catrin Larsson; Annika Dahlman; Marie-Helene Westin	Canada Angela Schmidt-Foster; Carol Gibson; Jean McAllister; Marie-Andree Masson	Switzerland Margrit Ruhstaller; Gaby Zurbrügg; Marianne Irniger; Evi Kratzer	
4	17 February 1987	(West Germany) Oberstdorf	4 × 5 km relay F *	Soviet Union Antonina Ordina; Nina Gavrylyuk; Larisa Lazutina; Anfisa Reztsova	Norway Marianne Dahlmo; Nina Skeime; Anne Jahren; Anette Bøe	Sweden Magdalena Wallin; Karin Lamberg-Skog; Annika Dahlman; Marie-Helene Westin	
5	1 March 1987	(Finland) Lahti	4 × 5 km relay C/F	Soviet Union Antonina Ordina; Larisa Lazutina; Yelena Vyalbe; Anfisa Reztsova	Norway Brit Pettersen; Anne Jahren; Nina Skeime; Marianne Dahlmo	Finland Tuulikki Pyykkönen; Pirkko Määttä; Jaana Savolainen; Marjo Matikainen	
6	19 March 1987	(Norway) Holmenkollen	4 × 5 km relay C	Norway I Trude Dybendahl; Brit Pettersen; Inger Helene Nybråten; Grete Ingeborg Nykkelmo	Finland Eija Hyytiäinen; Marjo Matikainen; Pirkko Määttä; Tuulikki Pyykkönen	Norway II Marianne Dahlmo; Anette Bøe; Nina Skeime; Anne Jahren	

- NOTE: Races marked with a star (*) counts officially for both as "FIS World Cup" and "FIS Nordic World Ski Championships" wins statistics.

== Overall standings ==
=== Men ===
Place	Skier	Country	Points
1.	Torgny Mogren	(Sweden)	115
2.	Thomas Wassberg	(Sweden)	98
3.	Gunde Svan	(Sweden)	83
4.	Vegard Ulvang	(Norway)	74
5.	Vladimir Smirnov	(Soviet Union)	64
6.	Alexey Prokurorov	(Soviet Union)	62
7.	Pierre Harvey	(Canada)	60
8.	Thomas Eriksson	(Sweden)	59
9.	Harri Kirvesniemi	(Finland)	57
9.	Kari Ristanen	(Finland)	48

=== Women ===
Place	Skier	Country	Points
1.	Marjo Matikainen	(Finland)	127
2.	Anfisa Reztsova	(Soviet Union)	97
3.	Marianne Dahlmo	(Norway)	95
4.	Marie-Helene Westin	(Sweden)	85
5.	Brit Pettersen	(Norway)	75
6.	Anette Bøe	(Norway)	61
7.	Evi Kratzer	(Switzerland)	60
8.	Anne Jahren	(Norway)	59
9.	Grete Ingeborg Nykkelmo	(Norway)	53
10.	Raisa Smetanina	(Soviet Union)	51

== Achievements ==
First World Cup career victory

Men

- (Italy) Marco Albarello, 26, in his 4th season – the WC 6 (15 km C) in Oberstdorf; also first podium
- (Italy) Maurilio De Zolt, 36, in his 6th season – the WC 7 (50 km F) in Oberstdorf; first podium was 1981–82 WC 7 (50 km) in Lahti
- (Soviet Union) Alexey Prokurorov, 22, in his 4th season – the WC 8 (30 km F) in Lahti; also first podium
- (Canada) Pierre Harvey, 29, in his 6th season – the WC 9 (30 km F) in Falun; also first podium

Women

- (Switzerland) Evi Kratzer, 26, in her 6th season – the WC 4 (10 km C) in Calgary; first podium was 1984–85 WC 2 (10 km) in Davos
- (Sweden) Marie-Helene Westin, 20, in her 2nd season – the WC 7 (20 km F) in Oberstdorf; also first podium

Victories in this World Cup (all-time number of victories as of 1986–87 season in parentheses)

Men

- Gunde Svan (SWE), 2 (18) first places
- Thomas Wassberg (SWE), 2 (6) first place
- Torgny Mogren (SWE), 1 (3) first place
- Thomas Eriksson (SWE), 1 (2) first place
- Harri Kirvesniemi (FIN), 1 (2) first place
- Marco Albarello (ITA), 1 (1) first place
- Maurilio De Zolt (ITA), 1 (1) first place
- Alexey Prokurorov (URS), 1 (1) first place
- Pierre Harvey (CAN), 1 (1) first place

Women

- Marjo Matikainen (FIN), 3 (5) first places
- Brit Pettersen (NOR), 2 (10) first places
- Anette Bøe (NOR), 1 (9) first place
- Marianne Dahlmo (NOR), 1 (2) first place
- Grete Ingeborg Nykkelmo (NOR), 1 (2) first place
- Anne Jahren (NOR), 1 (2) first place
- Evi Kratzer (SUI), 1 (1) first place
- Marie-Helene Westin (SWE), 1 (1) first place
