= Cross-country skiing at the 1988 Winter Olympics =

Cross-country skiing at the XV Olympic Winter Games
- Pictogram for cross-country skiing
- Venue: Canmore Nordic Centre Provincial Park
- Dates: 14–27 February
- No. of events: 8
- Competitors: 197 (120 men, 77 women) from 35 nations

1988 Winter Olympic Games cross-country skiing results was contested at the Canmore Nordic Centre in Canmore, Alberta, Canada.

== Medal summary ==
=== Medal table ===
| Rank | Nation | Gold | Silver | Bronze | Total |
|---|---|---|---|---|---|
| 1 | Soviet Union | 5 | 5 | 3 | 13 |
| 2 | Sweden | 2 | 0 | 0 | 2 |
| 3 | Finland | 1 | 0 | 2 | 3 |
| 4 | Norway | 0 | 2 | 1 | 3 |
| 5 | Italy | 0 | 1 | 0 | 1 |
| 6 | Czechoslovakia | 0 | 0 | 1 | 1 |
| 6 | Switzerland | 0 | 0 | 1 | 1 |
| Totals (7 entries) | | 8 | 8 | 8 | 24 |

=== Participating NOCs ===
Thirty-four nations sent cross-country skiers to compete in the events in Calgary.

- Argentina
- Australia
- Austria
- Bulgaria
- Canada
- China
- Costa Rica
- Czechoslovakia
- East Germany
- Fiji
- Finland
- France
- Great Britain
- Greece
- Guatemala
- Hungary
- Iceland
- Italy
- Japan
- Liechtenstein
- Mexico
- Mongolia
- Norway
- Romania
- San Marino
- South Korea
- Soviet Union
- Spain
- Sweden
- Switzerland
- Turkey
- United States
- West Germany
- Yugoslavia

=== Men's events ===
| Event | Gold | | Silver | | Bronze | |
|---|---|---|---|---|---|---|
| 15 kilometre classical | Mikhail Devyatyarov; Soviet Union | 41:18.9 | Pål Gunnar Mikkelsplass; Norway | 41:33.4 | Vladimir Smirnov; Soviet Union | 41:48.5 |
| 30 kilometre classical | Alexey Prokurorov; Soviet Union | 1:24:26.3 | Vladimir Smirnov; Soviet Union | 1:24:35.1 | Vegard Ulvang; Norway | 1:25:11.6 |
| 50 kilometre freestyle | Gunde Svan; Sweden | 2:04:30.9 | Maurilio De Zolt; Italy | 2:05:36.4 | Andi Grünenfelder; Switzerland | 2:06:01.9 |
| 4 × 10 km relay | Sweden; Jan Ottosson; Thomas Wassberg; Gunde Svan; Torgny Mogren | 1:43:58.6 | Soviet Union; Vladimir Smirnov; Vladimir Sakhnov; Mikhail Devyatyarov; Alexey Prokurorov | 1:44:11.3 | Czechoslovakia; Radim Nyč; Václav Korunka; Pavel Benc; Ladislav Švanda | 1:45:22.7 |

=== Women's events ===
| Event | Gold | | Silver | | Bronze | |
|---|---|---|---|---|---|---|
| 5 kilometre classical | Marjo Matikainen; Finland | 15:04.0 | Tamara Tikhonova; Soviet Union | 15:05.3 | Vida Vencienė; Soviet Union | 15:11.1 |
| 10 kilometre classical | Vida Vencienė; Soviet Union | 30:08.3 | Raisa Smetanina; Soviet Union | 30:17.0 | Marjo Matikainen; Finland | 30:20.5 |
| 20 kilometre freestyle | Tamara Tikhonova; Soviet Union | 55:53.6 | Anfisa Reztsova; Soviet Union | 56:12.8 | Raisa Smetanina; Soviet Union | 57:22.1 |
| 4 × 5 km relay | Soviet Union; Svetlana Nageykina; Nina Gavrylyuk; Tamara Tikhonova; Anfisa Reztsova | 59:51.1 | Norway; Trude Dybendahl; Marit Wold; Anne Jahren; Marianne Dahlmo | 1:01:33.0 | Finland; Pirkko Määttä; Marja-Liisa Kirvesniemi; Marjo Matikainen; Jaana Savolainen | 1:01:53.8 |

== See also ==
- Cross-country skiing at the 1988 Winter Paralympics
