= Austria at the 1998 Winter Olympics =

Coordinates: 36.655860°N 138.192131°E

- IOC code: AUT
- NOC: Austrian Olympic Committee
- Website: www.olympia.at (in German)

in Nagano
- Competitors: 96 (73 men, 23 women) in 12 sports
- Flag bearer: Emese Hunyady (speed skating)
- Medals Ranked 8th: Gold 3 Silver 5 Bronze 9 Total 17

Winter Olympics appearances (overview)
- 1924; 1928; 1932; 1936; 1948; 1952; 1956; 1960; 1964; 1968; 1972; 1976; 1980; 1984; 1988; 1992; 1994; 1998; 2002; 2006; 2010; 2014; 2018; 2022; 2026

Austria competed at the 1998 Winter Olympics in Nagano, Japan.

== Medalists ==
Medal	Name	Sport	Event	Date
Gold	Mario Reiter	Alpine skiing	Men's combined	13 February
Gold	Hermann Maier	Alpine skiing	Men's super-G	16 February
Gold	Hermann Maier	Alpine skiing	Men's giant slalom	19 February
Silver	Michaela Dorfmeister	Alpine skiing	Women's super-G	11 February
Silver	Markus Gandler	Cross-country skiing	Men's 10 kilometre classical	12 February
Silver	Hans Knauss	Alpine skiing	Men's super-G	16 February
Silver	Stephan Eberharter	Alpine skiing	Men's giant slalom	19 February
Silver	Alexandra Meissnitzer	Alpine skiing	Women's giant slalom	20 February
Bronze	Brigitte Köck	Snowboarding	Women's giant slalom	10 February
Bronze	Andreas Widhölzl	Ski jumping	Normal hill individual	11 February
Bronze	Alexandra Meissnitzer	Alpine skiing	Women's super-G	11 February
Bronze	Angelika Neuner	Luge	Women's singles	11 February
Bronze	Hannes Trinkl	Alpine skiing	Men's downhill	13 February
Bronze	Christian Mayer	Alpine skiing	Men's combined	13 February
Bronze	Reinhard Schwarzenberger; Martin Höllwarth; Stefan Horngacher; Andreas Widhölzl	Ski jumping	Large hill team	17 February
Bronze	Thomas Sykora	Alpine skiing	Men's slalom	21 February
Bronze	Christian Hoffmann	Cross-country skiing	Men's 50 kilometre freestyle	22 February

== Competitors ==
The following is the list of number of competitors in the Games.

Sport	Men	Women	Total
Alpine skiing	11	8	19
Biathlon	5	0	5
Bobsleigh	8	–	8
Cross-country skiing	5	2	7
Figure skating	0	1	1
Freestyle skiing	1	1	2
Ice hockey	22	0	22
Luge	5	3	8
Nordic combined	4	–	4
Ski jumping	5	–	5
Snowboarding	5	6	11
Speed skating	2	2	4
Total	73	23	96

== Alpine skiing ==
Men

Athlete	Event	Race 1	Race 2	Total	
Athlete	Event	Time	Time	Time	Rank
Hermann Maier	Downhill			DNF	–
Fritz Strobl	Downhill			1:51.34	11
Andreas Schifferer	Downhill			1:50.77	7
Hannes Trinkl	Downhill			1:50.63	3rd place, bronze medalist(s)
Stephan Eberharter	Super-G			DSQ	–
Andreas Schifferer	Super-G			1:37.00	19
Hans Knauß	Super-G			1:35.43	2nd place, silver medalist(s)
Hermann Maier	Super-G			1:34.82	1st place, gold medalist(s)
Hans Knauß	Giant Slalom	1:21.16	1:18.55	2:39.71	4
Stephan Eberharter	Giant Slalom	1:20.94	1:18.42	2:39.36	2nd place, silver medalist(s)
Christian Mayer	Giant Slalom	1:20.84	1:19.83	2:40.67	9
Hermann Maier	Giant Slalom	1:20.36	1:18.15	2:38.51	1st place, gold medalist(s)
Mario Reiter	Slalom	DNF	–	DNF	–
Christian Mayer	Slalom	56.37	54.72	1:51.09	5
Thomas Stangassinger	Slalom	55.63	55.62	1:51.25	6
Thomas Sykora	Slalom	55.06	55.62	1:50.68	3rd place, bronze medalist(s)

Men's combined

Athlete	Slalom		Downhill	Total	
Athlete	Time 1	Time 2	Time	Total time	Rank
Hermann Maier	50.37	45.53	DNF	DNF	–
Christian Mayer	49.30	45.75	1:35.06	3:10.11	3rd place, bronze medalist(s)
Günther Mader	49.19	46.17	1:34.83	3:10.19	4
Mario Reiter	47.37	44.48	1:36.21	3:08.06	1st place, gold medalist(s)

Women

Athlete	Event	Race 1	Race 2	Total	
Athlete	Event	Time	Time	Time	Rank
Renate Götschl	Downhill			DNF	–
Michaela Dorfmeister	Downhill			1:31.17	18
Stefanie Schuster	Downhill			1:30.73	15
Alexandra Meissnitzer	Downhill			1:29.84	8
Stefanie Schuster	Super-G			1:18.53	9
Renate Götschl	Super-G			1:18.32	5
Alexandra Meissnitzer	Super-G			1:18.09	3rd place, bronze medalist(s)
Michaela Dorfmeister	Super-G			1:18.03	2nd place, silver medalist(s)
Christiane Mitterwallner	Giant Slalom	1:23.10	1:35.36	2:58.46	20
Stefanie Schuster	Giant Slalom	1:21.40	1:35.01	2:56.41	15
Alexandra Meissnitzer	Giant Slalom	1:20.13	1:32.26	2:52.39	2nd place, silver medalist(s)
Ingrid Salvenmoser	Slalom	46.84	46.55	1:33.39	6
Sabine Egger	Slalom	45.97	47.25	1:33.22	5

Women's combined

Athlete	Downhill	Slalom		Total	
Athlete	Time	Time 1	Time 2	Total time	Rank
Stefanie Schuster	1:30.10	36.25	35.76	2:42.25	4
Michaela Dorfmeister	1:30.10	DNF	–	DNF	–
Brigitte Obermoser	1:29.82	38.81	36.85	2:45.48	11
Renate Götschl	1:29.34	DNF	–	DNF	–

== Biathlon ==
Men

Event	Athlete	Misses ^{1}	Time	Rank
10 km Sprint	Reinhard Neuner	4	31:45.3	62
10 km Sprint	Wolfgang Rottmann	2	30:16.0	39
10 km Sprint	Wolfgang Perner	4	30:13.5	38
10 km Sprint	Ludwig Gredler	2	28:44.3	11

Event	Athlete	Time	Misses	Adjusted time ^{2}	Rank
20 km	Günther Dengg	1'00:33.9	5	1'05:33.9	62
20 km	Wolfgang Rottmann	58:23.5	2	1'00:23.5	26
20 km	Wolfgang Perner	56:14.1	4	1'00:14.1	24
20 km	Ludwig Gredler	55:56.5	3	58:56.5	12

Men's 4 × 7.5 km relay

Athletes	Race		
Athletes	Misses ^{1}	Time	Rank
Wolfgang Perner; Ludwig Gredler; Reinhard Neuner; Wolfgang Rottmann	2	1'25:33.8	11

^{1} A penalty loop of 150 metres had to be skied per missed target.
^{2} One minute added per missed target.

== Bobsleigh ==
Sled	Athletes	Event	Run 1		Run 2		Run 3		Total	
Sled	Athletes	Event	Time	Rank	Time	Rank	Time	Rank	Time	Rank
AUT-1	Hubert Schösser; Peter Leismuller; Erwin Arnold; Martin Schützenauer	Four-man	53.10	6	53.50	7	53.79	7	2:40.39	9
AUT-2	Kurt Einberger; Thomas Bachler; Georg Kuttner; Michael Müller	Four-man	53.92	17	53.83	17	54.39	18	2:42.14	18

== Cross-country skiing ==
Men

Event	Athlete	Race	
Event	Athlete	Time	Rank
10 km C	Achim Walcher	28:58.6	23
10 km C	Gerhard Urain	28:25.2	14
10 km C	Alois Stadlober	28:21.2	12
10 km C	Markus Gandler	27:32.5	2nd place, silver medalist(s)
15 km pursuit^{1} F	Gerhard Urain	41:40.8	16
15 km pursuit^{1} F	Alois Stadlober	41:33.1	14
15 km pursuit^{1} F	Achim Walcher	41:02.9	11
15 km pursuit^{1} F	Markus Gandler	40:50.2	7
30 km C	Gerhard Urain	1'43:22.9	43
50 km F	Gerhard Urain	DNF	–
50 km F	Achim Walcher	2'18:31.7	38
50 km F	Alois Stadlober	2'11:22.4	12
50 km F	Christian Hoffmann	2'06:01.8	3rd place, bronze medalist(s)

^{1} Starting delay based on 10 km results.
C = Classical style, F = Freestyle

Men's 4 × 10 km relay

Athletes	Race	
Athletes	Time	Rank
Markus Gandler; Alois Stadlober; Achim Walcher; Christian Hoffmann	1'43:16.5	9

Women

Event	Athlete	Race	
Event	Athlete	Time	Rank
5 km C	Renate Roider	19:18.3	42
5 km C	Maria Theurl	18:36.8	15
10 km pursuit^{2} F	Maria Theurl	29:58.8	13
15 km C	Renate Roider	51:07.0	26
30 km F	Maria Theurl	1'24:54.3	6

^{2} Starting delay based on 5 km results.
C = Classical style, F = Freestyle

== Figure skating ==
Women

Athlete	SP	FS	TFP	Rank
Julia Lautowa	21	13	23.5	14

== Freestyle skiing ==
Men

Athlete	Event	Qualification		Final	
Athlete	Event	Points	Rank	Points	Rank
Christian Rijavec	Aerials	212.51	10 Q	227.60	7

Women

Athlete	Event	Qualification		Final	
Athlete	Event	Points	Rank	Points	Rank
Sabina Hudribusch	Aerials	147.43	16	did not advance	

== Ice hockey ==
=== Men's tournament ===
==== Preliminary round - group A ====
Top team (shaded) advanced to the first round.

Team	GP	W	L	T	GF	GA	GD	Pts
Kazakhstan	3	2	0	1	14	11	+3	5
Slovakia	3	1	1	1	9	9	0	3
Italy	3	1	2	0	11	11	0	2
Austria	3	0	1	2	9	12	-3	2

All times are local (UTC-7).

7 February 1998	Austria	2 – 2 (1-0, 1-2, 0-0)	Slovakia	The Big Hat/ Aqua Wing Arena, Nagano, Japan; Attendance: 4,315

8 February 1998	Austria	5 – 5 (2-2, 2-1, 1-2)	Kazakhstan	The Big Hat/ Aqua Wing Arena, Nagano, Japan; Attendance: 9,410

10 February 1998	Italy	5 – 2 (2-0, 2-0, 1-2)	Austria	The Big Hat/ Aqua Wing Arena, Nagano, Japan; Attendance: 8,473

==== Consolation Round - 13th place match ====
All times are local (UTC-7).

12 February 1998	Japan	4 – 3 (SO) (1-2, 1-0, 1-1, 0-0, 1-0)	Austria 14th	The Big Hat/ Aqua Wing Arena, Nagano, Japan; Attendance: 9,495

==== Leading scorers ====
Rank	Player	GP	G	A	Pts	PIM
7th	Dominic Lavoie	4	5	1	6	8

- Team Roster
  - Claus Dalpiaz
  - Reinhard Divis
  - Dominic Lavoie
  - Andreas Pusnik
  - Martin Ulrich
  - Tom Searle
  - Gerhard Pusnik
  - Simon Wheeldon
  - Christoph Brandner
  - Herbert Hohenberger
  - Michael Lampert
  - Martin Hohenberger
  - Patrick Pilloni
  - Gerhard Unterluggauer
  - Gerald Ressmann
  - Rick Nasheim
  - Normand Krumpschmid
  - Mario Schaden
  - Christian Perthaler
  - Dieter Kalt
- Head coach: Ron Kennedy

== Luge ==
Men

Athlete	Run 1		Run 2		Run 3		Run 4		Total	
Athlete	Time	Rank	Time	Rank	Time	Rank	Time	Rank	Time	Rank
Gerhard Gleirscher	50.161	9	49.816	6	49.911	7	49.897	7	3:19.785	7
Markus Kleinheinz	50.016	5	49.779	5	49.918	8	50.011	9	3:19.724	5
Markus Prock	49.861	3	49.732	4	49.863	4	50.200	11	3:19.656	4

(Men's) Doubles

Athletes	Run 1		Run 2		Total	
Athletes	Time	Rank	Time	Rank	Time	Rank
Tobias Schiegl; Markus Schiegl	50.846	4	50.575	4	1:41.421	4

Women

Athlete	Run 1		Run 2		Run 3		Run 4		Total	
Athlete	Time	Rank	Time	Rank	Time	Rank	Time	Rank	Time	Rank
Sonja Manzenreiter	51.892	10	51.828	11	51.369	9	51.183	10	3:26.272	10
Andrea Tagwerker	51.518	5	51.335	4	50.990	5	50.648	4	3:24.491	5
Angelika Neuner	51.417	3	51.286	3	50.945	4	50.605	1	3:24.253	3rd place, bronze medalist(s)

== Nordic combined ==
Men's individual

Events:

- normal hill ski jumping
- 15 km cross-country skiing (Start delay, based on ski jumping results.)

Athlete	Event	Ski Jumping		Cross-country time	Total rank
Athlete	Event	Points	Rank	Cross-country time	Total rank
Felix Gottwald	Individual	190.0	40	45:16.2	21
Christoph Eugen	Individual	199.5	29	45:37.7	24
Mario Stecher	Individual	228.5	7	43:09.9	8
Christoph Bieler	Individual	231.0	5	44:55.5	19

Men's Team

Four participants per team.

Events:

- normal hill ski jumping
- 5 km cross-country skiing (Start delay, based on ski jumping results.)

Athletes	Ski jumping		Cross-country time	Total rank
Athletes	Points	Rank	Cross-country time	Total rank
Christoph Eugen; Christoph Bieler; Mario Stecher; Felix Gottwald	903.5	2	56:04.6	4

== Ski jumping ==
Athlete	Event	Jump 1			Jump 2		Total	
Athlete	Event	Distance	Points	Rank	Distance	Points	Points	Rank
Andi Goldberger	Normal hill	81.0	97.5	22 Q	81.5	99.0	196.5	22
Stefan Horngacher	Normal hill	85.0	107.0	11 Q	84.5	105.5	212.5	10
Reinhard Schwarzenberger	Normal hill	86.0	109.0	9 Q	83.0	102.0	211.0	11
Andreas Widhölzl	Normal hill	88.0	114.5	3 Q	90.5	118.0	232.5	3rd place, bronze medalist(s)
Stefan Horngacher	Large hill	84.0	41.2	60	did not advance			
Martin Höllwarth	Large hill	104.5	86.6	43	did not advance			
Reinhard Schwarzenberger	Large hill	115.5	108.4	16 Q	131.0	135.8	244.2	7
Andreas Widhölzl	Large hill	131.0	138.8	1 Q	120.5	119.4	258.2	4

Men's team large hill

Athletes	Result	
Athletes	Points ^{1}	Rank
Reinhard Schwarzenberger; Martin Höllwarth; Stefan Horngacher; Andreas Widhölzl	881.5	3rd place, bronze medalist(s)

^{1} Four teams members performed two jumps each.

== Snowboarding ==
Men's giant slalom

Athlete	Race 1	Race 2	Total	
Athlete	Time	Time	Time	Rank
Dieter Happ	1:02.65	1:04.40	2:07.05	9
Sigi Grabner	1:00.61	DSQ	DSQ	–
Dieter Krassnig	1:00.11	1:04.40	2:04.33	4
Martin Freinademetz	59.58	1:05.76	2:05.34	7

Men's halfpipe

Athlete	Qualifying round 1		Qualifying round 2		Final	
Athlete	Points	Rank	Points	Rank	Points	Rank
Max Ploetzeneder	35.1	19	35.9	16	did not advance	

Women's giant slalom

Athlete	Race 1	Race 2	Total	
Athlete	Time	Time	Time	Rank
Heidi Jaufenthaler	1:18.43	1:09.51	2:27.94	14
Brigitte Köck	1:13.01	1:06.41	2:19.42	3rd place, bronze medalist(s)
Ursula Fingerlos	1:12.37	1:07.99	2:20.36	5
Isabel Zedlacher	1:11.89	1:11.03	2:22.92	8

Women's halfpipe

Athlete	Qualifying round 1		Qualifying round 2		Final	
Athlete	Points	Rank	Points	Rank	Points	Rank
Ulrike Hölzl	24.8	21	29.1	13	did not advance	
Nicola Pederzolli	31.5	12	34.4	5	did not advance	

== Speed skating ==
Men

Event	Athlete	Race 1		Race 2		Total	
Event	Athlete	Time	Rank	Time	Rank	Time	Rank
500 m	Roland Brunner	36.90	30	36.86	28	73.76	29
1000 m	Roland Brunner					1:13.16	31
1500 m	Marnix ten Kortenaar					1:51.94	18
5000 m	Marnix ten Kortenaar					6:38.35	10
10,000 m	Marnix ten Kortenaar					13:52.30	12

Women

Event	Athlete	Race 1		Race 2		Total	
Event	Athlete	Time	Rank	Time	Rank	Time	Rank
500 m	Emese Nemeth-Hunyady	DSQ	–	–	–	DSQ	–
1500 m	Emese Dörfler-Antal					2:07.57	30
1500 m	Emese Nemeth-Hunyady					1:59.19	4
3000 m	Emese Dörfler-Antal					4:33.67	27
3000 m	Emese Nemeth-Hunyady					4:12.01	5
5000 m	Emese Nemeth-Hunyady					7:15.23	8
