= Alexey Prokurorov =

Cross-country skier

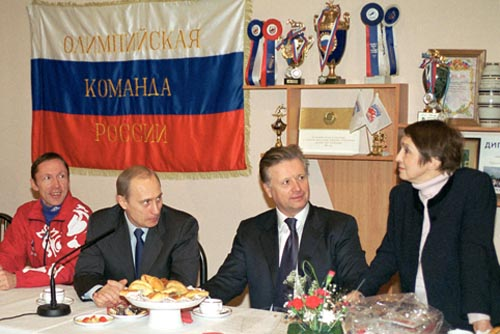
- Prokurorov (left) in 2002

Personal information
- Full name: Alexey Alexeyevich Prokurorov
- Nationality: Russia
- Born: 25 March 1964 Mishino, Russian SFSR, Soviet Union
- Died: 10 October 2008 (aged 44) Vladimir, Russia

Sport
- Sport: Skiing

World Cup career
- Seasons: 18 – (1984, 1986–2002)
- Indiv. starts: 156
- Indiv. podiums: 22
- Indiv. wins: 9
- Team starts: 47
- Team podiums: 16
- Team wins: 3
- Overall titles: 0 – (4th in 1995, 1996)
- Discipline titles: 0
Medal record
Men's cross-country skiing
Representing Soviet Union
Olympic Games
Gold medal – first place	1988 Calgary	30 km classical
Silver medal – second place	1988 Calgary	4 × 10 km relay
World Championships
Bronze medal – third place	1989 Lahti	50 km freestyle
Representing Russia
World Championships
Gold medal – first place	1997 Trondheim	30 km freestyle
Silver medal – second place	1997 Trondheim	10 km classical
Bronze medal – third place	1993 Falun	4 × 10 km relay
Bronze medal – third place	1995 Thunder Bay	30 km classical
Bronze medal – third place	1997 Trondheim	10 km + 15 km combined pursuit

Alexey Alexeyevich Prokurorov (Russian: Алексе́й Алексе́евич Прокуро́ров; 25 March 1964 – 10 October 2008) was a Soviet/Russian cross-country skier who competed in the late 1980s and 1990s for both the Soviet Union and Russia.

== Career ==
Prokurorov was born in the village of Mishino of Vladimir Oblast, Russian SFSR, Soviet Union.

Prokurorov's biggest successes were winning the gold medal in the 30 km freestyle and the silver medal in the 4 × 10 km relay at the 1988 Winter Olympics in Calgary.

At the FIS Nordic World Ski Championships, Prokurorov earned a total of six medals. This included one gold (30 km: 1997), one silver (10 km: 1997), and four bronzes (50 km: 1989, 4 × 10 km relay: 1993, 30 km: 1995, 10 km + 15 km combined pursuit: 1997). He also won the 50 km event twice at the Holmenkollen ski festival (1993, 1998). He also won the Russian championship title 13 times.

Prokurorov received the Holmenkollen medal, the highest Norwegian skiing award, in 1998 (shared with Fred Børre Lundberg, Larissa Lazutina and Harri Kirvesniemi).

Prokurorov was a flag bearer of Russian team at the 1998 Winter Olympics and 2002 Winter Olympics.

Prokurorov retired after the 2001/2002 season at the age of 39. After retirement, he was Chief coach of the Russian women cross-country skiing team. He received state honors for his services to sports.

He died in a road crash in Vladimir on 10 October 2008, when he was hit by a car driven by a drunk man as he was crossing the road.

== Cross-country skiing results ==
All results are sourced from the International Ski Federation (FIS).

=== Olympic Games ===
- 2 medals – (1 gold, 1 silver)

Year	Age	10 km	15 km	Pursuit	30 km	50 km	4 × 10 km relay
1988	23	—N/a	18	—N/a	1st	38	2nd
1992	27	—	—N/a	—	21	4	5
1994	29	20	—N/a	12	28	13	5
1998	33	31	—N/a	18	—	4	5
2002	37	—N/a	—	29	—	28	—

=== World Championships ===
- 6 medals – (1 gold, 1 silver, 4 bronze)

Year	Age	10 km	15 km classical	15 km freestyle	Pursuit	30 km	50 km	4 × 10 km relay
1989	24	—N/a	—	4	—N/a	6	3rd	5
1991	26	—	—N/a	13	—N/a	14	6	5
1993	28	—	—N/a	—N/a	—	11	50	3rd
1995	30	13	—N/a	—N/a	6	3rd	18	6
1997	32	2nd	—N/a	—N/a	3rd	1st	4	4
1999	34	4	—N/a	—N/a	7	28	26	7
2001	36	—N/a	12	—N/a	—	19	9	—

=== World Cup ===
Season Standings
Season	Age	Overall	Long Distance	Middle Distance	Sprint
1984	20	54	—N/a	—N/a	—N/a
1986	22	18	—N/a	—N/a	—N/a
1987	23	6	—N/a	—N/a	—N/a
1988	24	9	—N/a	—N/a	—N/a
1989	25	10	—N/a	—N/a	—N/a
1990	26	14	—N/a	—N/a	—N/a
1991	27	18	—N/a	—N/a	—N/a
1992	28	20	—N/a	—N/a	—N/a
1993	29	9	—N/a	—N/a	—N/a
1994	30	9	—N/a	—N/a	—N/a
1995	31	4	—N/a	—N/a	—N/a
1996	32	4	—N/a	—N/a	—N/a
1997	33	10	9	—N/a	48
1998	34	14	6	—N/a	28
1999	35	9	5	—N/a	37
2000	36	36	14	35	NC
2001	37	29	—N/a	—N/a	—
2002	38	134	—N/a	—N/a	—

==== Individual podiums ====
- 9 victories
- 22 podiums

No.	Season	Date	Location	Race	Level	Place
1	1986–87	1 March 1987	Lahti, Finland	30 km Individual F	World Cup	1st
2	1986–87	7 March 1987	Falun, Sweden	30 km Individual F	World Cup	2nd
3	1987–88	9 January 1988	Kavgolovo, Soviet Union	30 km Individual C	World Cup	2nd
4	1987–88	15 February 1988	Calgary, Canada	30 km Individual C	Olympic Games (Note: Until the 1999 World Championships and the 1994 Winter Olympics, World Championship and Olympic races were included in the World Cup scoring system.)	1st
5	1988–89	26 February 1989	Lahti, Finland	50 km Individual F	World Championships	3rd
6	1989–90	6 March 1990	Trondheim, Norway	15 km Individual C	World Cup	1st
7	1992–93	18 December 1992	Val di Fiemme, Italy	30 km Individual F	World Cup	3rd
8	1992–93	13 March 1993	Oslo, Norway	30 km Individual C	World Cup	1st
9	1993–94	19 March 1994	Thunder Bay, Canada	50 km Individual F	World Cup	1st
10	1994–95	14 December 1994	Tauplitzalm, Austria	15 km Individual C	World Cup	1st
11	1994–95	8 January 1995	Östersund, Sweden	30 km Individual F	World Cup	2nd
12	1994–95	11 February 1995	Oslo, Norway	50 km Individual C	World Cup	2nd
13	1994–95	9 March 1995	Thunder Bay, Canada	30 km Individual C	World Championships	3rd
14	1995–96	10 March 1996	Kavgolovo, Russia	15 km Individual C	World Cup	1st
15	1995–96	24 February 1996	Trondheim, Norway	30 km Individual F	World Cup	3rd
16	1995–96	3 March 1996	Lahti, Finland	30 km Individual F	World Cup	3rd
17	1996–97	21 February 1997	Trondheim, Norway	30 km Individual F	World Championships	1st
18	1996–97	24 February 1997	Trondheim, Norway	10 km Individual C	World Championships	2nd
19	1996–97	25 February 1997	Trondheim, Norway	15 km Pursuit F	World Championships	3rd
20	1997–98	14 March 1998	Oslo, Norway	50 km Individual C	World Cup	1st
21	1998–99	19 December 1998	Davos, Switzerland	30 km Individual C	World Cup	2nd
22	2000–01	4 March 2001	Kavgolovo, Russia	15 km Individual F	World Cup	3rd

==== Team podiums ====
- 3 victories
- 16 podiums

No.	Season	Date	Location	Race	Level	Place	Teammates
1	1986–87	8 March 1987	Falun, Sweden	4 × 10 km Relay C	World Cup	2nd	Batyuk / Sakhnov / Uschkalenko
2	1987–88	24 February 1988	Calgary, Canada	4 × 10 km Relay F	Olympic Games (Note: Until the 1999 World Championships and the 1994 Winter Olympics, World Championship and Olympic races were included in the World Cup scoring system.)	2nd	Smirnov / Sakhnov / Devyatyarov
3	1988–89	5 March 1989	Oslo, Norway	4 × 10 km Relay F	World Cup	2nd	Badamshin / Smirnov / Sakhnov
4	1988–89	12 March 1989	Falun, Sweden	4 × 10 km Relay C	World Cup	1st	Badamshin / Sakhnov / Smirnov
5	1989–90	1 March 1990	Lahti, Finland	4 × 10 km Relay C/F	World Cup	2nd	Badamshin / Botvinov / Smirnov
6	1990–91	1 March 1991	Lahti, Finland	4 × 10 km Relay C/F	World Cup	3rd	Botvinov / Badamshin / Plaksunov
7	1991–92	28 February 1992	Lahti, Finland	4 × 10 km Relay F	World Cup	1st	Kirillov / Botvinov / Smirnov
8	1991–92	8 March 1992	Funäsdalen, Sweden	4 × 10 km Relay C	World Cup	2nd	Kirillov / Botvinov / Smirnov
9	1992–93	26 February 1993	Falun, Sweden	4 × 10 km Relay C/F	World Championships	3rd	Kirillov / Badamshin / Botvinov
10	1992–93	5 March 1993	Lahti, Finland	4 × 10 km Relay C	World Cup	2nd	Vorobyov / Badamshin / Botvinov
11	1995–96	1 March 1996	Lahti, Finland	4 × 10 km Relay C/F	World Cup	2nd	Tchepikov / Botvinov / Tchernych
12	1997–98	7 December 1997	Santa Caterina, Italy	4 × 10 km Relay F	World Cup	1st	Pitchouguine / Legotine / Tchepikov
13	1997–98	6 March 1998	Lahti, Finland	4 × 10 km Relay C/F	World Cup	3rd	Legotine / Noutrikhin / Tchepikov
14	1998–99	14 March 1999	Falun, Sweden	4 × 10 km Relay C/F	World Cup	3rd	Denisov / Ivanov / Vilisov
15	1998–99	21 March 1999	Oslo, Norway	4 × 10 km Relay C	World Cup	2nd	Denisov / Ivanov / Vilisov
16	1999–00	13 January 2000	Nové Město, Czech Republic	4 × 10 km Relay C/F	World Cup	3rd	Denisov / Ivanov / Vilisov
