= Mishino =

Mishino (Russian: Мишино) is the name of several rural localities in Russia.

== Ivanovo Oblast ==
As of 2010, one rural locality in Ivanovo Oblast bears this name:

- Mishino, Ivanovo Oblast, a village in Verkhnelandekhovsky District

== Kirov Oblast ==
As of 2010, one rural locality in Kirov Oblast bears this name:

- Mishino, Kirov Oblast, a village in Ichetovkinsky Rural Okrug of Afanasyevsky District

== Leningrad Oblast ==
As of 2010, one rural locality in Leningrad Oblast bears this name:

- Mishino, Leningrad Oblast, a village in Vistinskoye Settlement Municipal Formation of Kingiseppsky District

== Lipetsk Oblast ==
As of 2010, one rural locality in Lipetsk Oblast bears this name:

- Mishino, Lipetsk Oblast, a village in Lomigorsky Selsoviet of Volovsky District

== Moscow Oblast ==
As of 2010, one rural locality in Moscow Oblast bears this name:

- Mishino, Moscow Oblast, a village in Gololobovskoye Rural Settlement of Zaraysky District

== Nizhny Novgorod Oblast ==
As of 2010, one rural locality in Nizhny Novgorod Oblast bears this name:

- Mishino, Nizhny Novgorod Oblast, a village in Solomatovsky Selsoviet of Chkalovsky District

== Novgorod Oblast ==
As of 2010, one rural locality in Novgorod Oblast bears this name:

- Mishino, Novgorod Oblast, a village in Volokskoye Settlement of Borovichsky District

== Penza Oblast ==
As of 2010, one rural locality in Penza Oblast bears this name:

- Mishino, Penza Oblast, a selo in Kamenno-Brodsky Selsoviet of Issinsky District

== Perm Krai ==
As of 2010, two rural localities in Perm Krai bear this name:

- Mishino, Karagaysky District, Perm Krai, a village in Karagaysky District
- Mishino, Vereshchaginsky District, Perm Krai, a village in Vereshchaginsky District

== Pskov Oblast ==
As of 2010, two rural localities in Pskov Oblast bear this name:

- Mishino, Dedovichsky District, Pskov Oblast, a village in Dedovichsky District
- Mishino, Novorzhevsky District, Pskov Oblast, a village in Novorzhevsky District

== Smolensk Oblast ==
As of 2010, four rural localities in Smolensk Oblast bear this name:

- Mishino, Gagarinsky District, Smolensk Oblast, a village in Nikolskoye Rural Settlement of Gagarinsky District
- Mishino, Otnosovskoye Rural Settlement, Vyazemsky District, Smolensk Oblast, a village in Otnosovskoye Rural Settlement of Vyazemsky District
- Mishino, Polyanovskoye Rural Settlement, Vyazemsky District, Smolensk Oblast, a village in Polyanovskoye Rural Settlement of Vyazemsky District
- Mishino, Yermolinskoye Rural Settlement, Vyazemsky District, Smolensk Oblast, a village in Yermolinskoye Rural Settlement of Vyazemsky District

== Tver Oblast ==
As of 2010, three rural localities in Tver Oblast bear this name:

- Mishino, Konakovsky District, Tver Oblast, a village in Konakovsky District
- Mishino, Toropetsky District, Tver Oblast, a village in Toropetsky District
- Mishino, Zubtsovsky District, Tver Oblast, a village in Zubtsovsky District

== Vladimir Oblast ==
As of 2010, one rural locality in Vladimir Oblast bears this name:

- Mishino, Vladimir Oblast, a village in Muromsky District

== Vologda Oblast ==
As of 2010, five rural localities in Vologda Oblast bear this name:

- Mishino, Sholsky Selsoviet, Belozersky District, Vologda Oblast, a village in Sholsky Selsoviet of Belozersky District
- Mishino, Sholsky Selsoviet, Belozersky District, Vologda Oblast, a village in Sholsky Selsoviet of Belozersky District
- Mishino, Chagodoshchensky District, Vologda Oblast, a village in Izboishchsky Selsoviet of Chagodoshchensky District
- Mishino, Cherepovetsky District, Vologda Oblast, a village in Dmitriyevsky Selsoviet of Cherepovetsky District
- Mishino, Vytegorsky District, Vologda Oblast, a village in Saminsky Selsoviet of Vytegorsky District

== See also ==
- Mishin
