= Vladimir Sakhnov =

Cross-country skier

Personal information
- Nationality: Kazakhstan
- Born: 25 April 1961 (age 65) Kamenka, Kazakh SSR, Soviet Union

Sport
- Sport: Skiing

World Cup career
- Seasons: 7 – (1983–1989)
- Indiv. starts: 27
- Indiv. podiums: 2
- Indiv. wins: 0
- Team starts: 6
- Team podiums: 5
- Team wins: 1
- Overall titles: 0 – (5th in 1984)
Medal record
Men's cross-country skiing
Representing Soviet Union
Olympic Games
Silver medal – second place	1988 Calgary	4 × 10 km relay
World Championships
Silver medal – second place	1987 Oberstdorf	4 × 10 km relay

Vladimir Nikolaevich Sakhnov (Russian: Владимир Николаевич Сахнов; born 25 April 1961 in Kamenka, Tselinograd Oblast, Kazakh SSR) is a former Soviet cross-country skier who raced from 1983 to 1989. Sakhnov trained at Armed Forces sports society in Alma-Ata. He earned a silver medal in the 4 × 10 km relay at the 1988 Winter Olympics in Calgary; his best individual Winter Olympics finish was a fourth in the 30 km event in 1984.

Sakhnov also won a silver medal in the 4 × 10 km relay at the 1987 FIS Nordic World Ski Championships. His best individual finish at the Nordic skiing World Championships was a sixth place in the 50 km event at those same championships.

Sakhnov's best career finish was second in two World Cup events (1984 and 1986).

== Cross-country skiing results ==
All results are sourced from the International Ski Federation (FIS).

=== Olympic Games ===
- 1 medal – (1 silver)

Year	Age	15 km	30 km	50 km	4 × 10 km relay
1984	22	—	4	8	—
1988	26	—	—	12	Silver

=== World Championships ===
- 1 medal – (1 silver)

Year	Age	15 km classical	15 km freestyle	30 km	50 km	4 × 10 km relay
1985	23	23	—N/a	—	8	—
1987	25	—	—N/a	20	6	Silver
1989	27	—	12	—	24	5

=== World Cup ===
==== Season standings ====
Season	Age	Overall
1983	21	42
1984	22	5
1985	23	24
1986	24	21
1987	25	13
1988	26	22
1989	27	15

==== Individual podiums ====
- 2 podiums

No.	Season	Date	Location	Race	Level	Place
1	1983–84	10 March 1984	Oslo, Norway	50 km Individual	World Cup	2nd
2	1985–86	14 February 1986	Oberstdorf, West Germany	50 km Individual F	World Cup	2nd

==== Team podiums ====
- 1 victory
- 5 podiums

No.	Season	Date	Location	Race	Level	Place	Teammates
1	1986–87	17 February 1987	Oberstdorf, West Germany	4 × 10 km Relay F	World Championships^{[1]}	2nd	Batyuk / Smirnov / Devyatyarov
2	1986–87	8 March 1987	Falun, Sweden	4 × 10 km Relay C	World Cup	2nd	Batyuk / Uschkalenko / Prokurorov
3	1987–88	24 February 1988	Calgary, Canada	4 × 10 km Relay F	Olympic Games^{[1]}	2nd	Smirnov / Devyatyarov / Prokurorov
4	1988–89	5 March 1989	Oslo, Norway	4 × 10 km Relay F	World Cup	2nd	Badamshin / Smirnov / Prokurorov
5	1988–89	12 March 1989	Falun, Sweden	4 × 10 km Relay C	World Cup	1st	Badamshin / Prokurorov / Smirnov

Note: ^{1} Until the 1999 World Championships and the 1994 Winter Olympics, World Championship and Olympic races were included in the World Cup scoring system.
