= Alexander Marent =

Austrian cross-country skier

Personal information
- Nationality: Austria
- Born: 21 February 1969 (age 57) Alberschwende, Austria

Sport
- Sport: Skiing
- Club: SV Mellau

World Cup career
- Seasons: 1989, 1991–2003
- Indiv. starts: 80
- Indiv. podiums: 0
- Team starts: 20
- Team podiums: 4
- Team wins: 1
- Overall titles: 0 – (45th in 1999)
- Discipline titles: 0

Alexander Marent (born 21 February 1969) is an Austrian cross-country skier. He represented Austria at the 1992 Winter Olympics in Albertville. At the 2002 Winter Olympics in Salt Lake City he placed fourth in the relay with the Austrian team.

== Cross-country skiing results ==
All results are sourced from the International Ski Federation (FIS).

=== Olympic Games ===
Year	Age	10 km	15 km	Pursuit	30 km	50 km	Sprint	4 × 10 km relay
1992	23	19	—N/a	27	22	DNF	—N/a	9
2002	33	—N/a	23	—	—	—	—	4

=== World Championships ===
Year	Age	10 km	15 km classical	15 km freestyle	Pursuit	30 km	50 km	Sprint	4 × 10 km relay
1989	20	—N/a	—	48	—N/a	—	—	—N/a	11
1991	22	—	—N/a	22	—N/a	31	—	—N/a	6
1995	26	52	—N/a	—N/a	23	46	DNF	—N/a	5
1999	28	26	—N/a	—N/a	21	—	38	—N/a	—
2001	30	—N/a	37	—N/a	32	—	—	—	
2003	32	—N/a	52	—N/a	—	—	—	—	—

=== World Cup ===
==== Season standings ====
Season	Age				
Season	Age	Overall	Long Distance	Middle Distance	Sprint
1989	20	NC	—N/a	—N/a	—N/a
1991	22	NC	—N/a	—N/a	—N/a
1992	23	NC	—N/a	—N/a	—N/a
1993	24	NC	—N/a	—N/a	—N/a
1994	25	NC	—N/a	—N/a	—N/a
1995	26	72	—N/a	—N/a	—N/a
1996	27	NC	—N/a	—N/a	—N/a
1997	28	NC	NC	—N/a	—
1998	29	NC	NC	—N/a	—
1999	30	45	71	—N/a	47
2000	31	72	NC	46	NC
2001	32	91	—N/a	—N/a	NC
2002	33	NC	—N/a	—N/a	—
2003	34	136	—N/a	—N/a	NC

==== Team podiums ====
- 1 victory
- 4 podiums

No.	Season	Date	Location	Race	Level	Place	Teammates
1	1998–99	20 December 1998	Davos, Switzerland	4 × 10 km Relay M	World Cup	3rd	Stadlober / Botvinov / Walcher
2	1998–99	10 January 1999	Nové Město, Czech Republic	4 × 10 km Relay C/F	World Cup	1st	Gandler / Botvinov / Hoffmann
3	1999–00	28 November 1999	Kiruna, Sweden	4 × 10 km Relay F	World Cup	3rd	Botvinov / Walcher / Urain
4	1999–00	13 January 2000	Nové Město, Czech Republic	4 × 10 km Relay C/F	World Cup	2nd	Botvinov / Walcher / Hoffmann
