= Vladimir Smirnov (skier) =

Kazakh cross-country skier

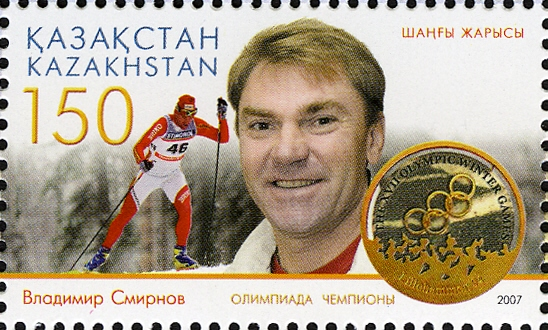
- Smirnov on a 2007 Kazakh stamp

Personal information
- Native name: Владимир Михайлович Смирнов
- Full name: Vladimir Mikhaylovich Smirnov
- Nationality: Kazakhstan; Sweden
- Born: 7 March 1964 (age 62) Shchuchinsk, Kokshetau Oblast, Kazakh SSR, Soviet Union
- Height: 1.83 m (6 ft 0 in)

Sport
- Sport: Skiing
- Club: Stockviks SF

World Cup career
- Seasons: 16 – (1983–1998)
- Indiv. starts: 132
- Indiv. podiums: 66
- Indiv. wins: 30
- Team starts: 14
- Team podiums: 8
- Team wins: 2
- Overall titles: 2 – (1991, 1994)
- Discipline titles: 0
Medal record
Representing the Soviet Union
Representing Kazakhstan
Men's cross-country skiing
Event	1st	2nd	3rd
Olympic Games	1	4	2
World Championships	4	4	3
Total	5	8	5
Olympic Games
Gold medal – first place	1994 Lillehammer	50 km classical
Silver medal – second place	1988 Calgary	30 km classical
Silver medal – second place	1988 Calgary	4 × 10 km relay
Silver medal – second place	1994 Lillehammer	10 km classical
Silver medal – second place	1994 Lillehammer	10 km + 15 km combined pursuit
Bronze medal – third place	1988 Calgary	15 km classical
Bronze medal – third place	1998 Nagano	10 km + 15 km combined pursuit
World Championships
Gold medal – first place	1989 Lahti	30 km classical
Gold medal – first place	1995 Thunder Bay	10 km classical
Gold medal – first place	1995 Thunder Bay	10 km + 15 km combined pursuit
Gold medal – first place	1995 Thunder Bay	30 km classical
Silver medal – second place	1987 Oberstdorf	4 × 10 km relay
Silver medal – second place	1991 Val di Fiemme	30 km classical
Silver medal – second place	1993 Falun	10 km classical
Silver medal – second place	1993 Falun	10 km + 15 km combined pursuit
Bronze medal – third place	1991 Val di Fiemme	15 km freestyle
Bronze medal – third place	1993 Falun	30 km classical
Bronze medal – third place	1995 Thunder Bay	50 km freestyle
Junior World Championships
Gold medal – first place	1983 Kuopio	3 × 5 km relay
Gold medal – first place	1984 Trondheim	3 × 5 km relay
Silver medal – second place	1983 Kuopio	15 km
Silver medal – second place	1984 Trondheim	15 km
Bronze medal – third place	1982 Murau	15 km
Bronze medal – third place	1982 Murau	3 × 5 km relay
Asian Winter Games
Gold medal – first place	1999 Gangwon	15 km classical
Gold medal – first place	1999 Gangwon	4 × 10 km relay
Silver medal – second place	1999 Gangwon	30 km freestyle

Vladimir Mikhaylovich Smirnov (Russian: Владимир Михайлович Смирнов; born 7 March 1964) is a Soviet-Kazakhstani former cross-country skier of Russian descent who raced from the 1982 until 1991 for the USSR and, later, for Kazakhstan. He is the first Olympic champion from independent Kazakhstan and the most decorated Olympian in history of Kazakhstan. He is also a vice president of the International Biathlon Union. Smirnov is a former member of International Olympic Committee.

== Early life ==
Smirnov was born to Russian parents in Shchuchinsk, Kazakh SSR. During the Soviet period, he trained at the Armed Forces sports society in Alma-Ata.

== Career ==
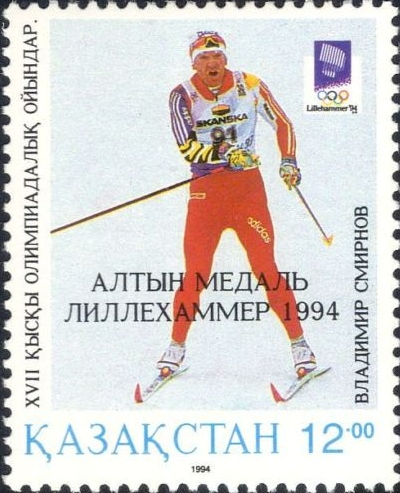
Smirnov in 1994

Smirnov made his debut in the FIS Cross-Country World Cup on 18 December 1982 at Davos in a 15 km race, finishing in a 17th place. His first victory came in 1986, a classic style 15 km in Kavgolovo (URS). Smirnov gained a total of 30 victories in the World Cup, with 21 second and 15 third places. In 1994, he won the aggregate World Cup, thanks to seven victories in the course of the season.

At the FIS Nordic World Ski Championships from 1987 to 1997, Smirnov totalled four gold (1989: 30 km, 1995: 10 km, 10 km + 15 km combined pursuit, 30 km), four silver (1987: 4x10 km, 1991: 30 km, 1993: 10 km, 10 km + 15 km combined pursuit) and three bronze medals (1991: 15 km, 1993: 30 km, 1995: 50 km). His best result was in Thunder Bay, Ontario (1995), when he won three events.

In 1994, he received the Holmenkollen Medal (shared with Lyubov Yegorova and Espen Bredesen). Smirnov also won twice at the Holmenkollen ski festival with a 15 km win in 1994 and a 50 km win in 1995.

A regular and effective cross-country skier, especially in long-distance classic style races, Smirnov took part to the Winter Olympics from 1988 to 1998. His best known victory was the 50 km gold medal at the 1994 Winter Olympics in Lillehammer, the first Olympic gold medal for Kazakhstan. He was one of the leading characters of that Olympics, as his unending rivalry with home ever-winning Bjørn Dæhlie had gained him the affection of the Norwegian audience. He also became good friends with his rival Dæhlie, even participating with Dæhlie in several popular Norwegian TV shows.

In the 1998 Winter Olympics, Smirnov was the flag-bearer of the Kazakhstani Olympic team and won the bronze medal in the 15 km pursuit event.

Smirnov headed the bid committee to have Almaty, Kazakhstan, host the 2014 Winter Olympics, a bid that failed to make the short list that was announced by the International Olympic Committee on 22 June 2006. In 2011, Smirnov participated at the opening ceremony of the 2011 Asian Winter Games in Astana.

== Personal life ==
Smirnov moved to Sweden in 1991 and lives in the city of Sundsvall, where he was a co-founder and co-owner of a local brewery. He is married to Valentina Smirnova, and they have two daughters – Anna and Karolina. He became a Swedish citizen in 1998. Smirnov speaks four languages: Russian, German, English and Swedish.

== Cross-country skiing results ==
All results are sourced from the International Ski Federation (FIS).

=== Olympic Games ===
- 7 medals – (1 gold, 4 silver, 2 bronze)

Year	Age	10 km	15 km	Pursuit	30 km	50 km	4 × 10 km relay
1988	23	—N/a	Bronze	—N/a	Silver	—	Silver
1992	27	13	—N/a	8	9	35	5
1994	29	Silver	—N/a	Silver	10	Gold	—
1998	33	4	—N/a	Bronze	12	8	—

=== World Championships ===
- 11 medals – (4 gold, 4 silver, 3 bronze)

Year	Age	10 km	15 km classical	15 km freestyle	Pursuit	30 km	50 km	4 × 10 km relay
1985	20	—N/a	16	—N/a	—N/a	24	—	6
1987	22	—N/a	5	—N/a	—N/a	DNF	—	Silver
1989	24	—N/a	10	—	—N/a	Gold	21	5
1991	26	22	—N/a	Bronze	—N/a	Silver	31	5
1993	28	Silver	—N/a	—N/a	Silver	Bronze	21	—
1995	30	Gold	—N/a	—N/a	Gold	Gold	Bronze	—
1997	32	4	—N/a	—N/a	8	42	19	—

=== World Cup ===
==== Season titles ====
- 2 titles – (2 overall)

Season
Season	Discipline
1991	Overall
1994	Overall

==== Season standings ====
Season	Age			
Season	Age	Overall	Long Distance	Sprint
1983	19	59	—N/a	—N/a
1984	20	31	—N/a	—N/a
1985	21	30	—N/a	—N/a
1986	22	3rd place, bronze medalist(s)	—N/a	—N/a
1987	23	5	—N/a	—N/a
1988	24	5	—N/a	—N/a
1989	25	5	—N/a	—N/a
1990	26	7	—N/a	—N/a
1991	27	1st place, gold medalist(s)	—N/a	—N/a
1992	28	3rd place, bronze medalist(s)	—N/a	—N/a
1993	29	2nd place, silver medalist(s)	—N/a	—N/a
1994	30	1st place, gold medalist(s)	—N/a	—N/a
1995	31	2nd place, silver medalist(s)	—N/a	—N/a
1996	32	2nd place, silver medalist(s)	—N/a	—N/a
1997	33	9	3rd place, bronze medalist(s)	37
1998	34	3rd place, bronze medalist(s)	4	3rd place, bronze medalist(s)

==== Individual podiums ====
- 30 victories
- 66 podiums

No.	Season	Date	Location	Race	Level	Place
1	1983–84	23 March 1984	Murmansk, Soviet Union	15 km Individual	World Cup	2nd
2	1985–86	8 December 1985	Labrador City, Canada	15 km Individual C	World Cup	2nd
3	1985–86	1 January 1986	La Bresse, France	30 km Individual C	World Cup	2nd
4	1985–86	23 February 1986	Kavgolovo, Soviet Union	15 km Individual C	World Cup	1st
5	1986–87	13 December 1986	Cogne, Italy	15 km Individual F	World Cup	3rd
6	1986–87	20 December 1986	Davos, Switzerland	30 km Individual C	World Cup	2nd
7	1987–88	9 January 1988	Kavgolovo, Soviet Union	30 km Individual C	World Cup	1st
8	1987–88	15 February 1988	Calgary, Canada	30 km Individual C	Olympic Games^{[1]}	2nd
9	1987–88	19 February 1988	Calgary, Canada	15 km Individual C	Olympic Games^{[1]}	3rd
10	1988–89	7 January 1989	Kavgolovo, Soviet Union	15 km Individual C	World Cup	3rd
11	1988–89	18 February 1989	Lahti, Finland	30 km Individual C	World Championships^{[1]}	1st
12	1989–90	25 February 1990	Reit im Winkl, West Germany	30 km Individual F	World Cup	1st
13	1989–90	10 March 1990	Örnsköldsvik, Sweden	30 km Individual C	World Cup	3rd
14	1990–91	9 December 1990	Tauplitzalm, Austria	10 km + 15 km Individual C/F	World Cup	2nd
15	1990–91	15 December 1990	Davos, Switzerland	15 km Individual C	World Cup	1st
16	1990–91	19 December 1990	Les Saisies, France	30 km Individual C	World Cup	1st
17	1990–91	5 January 1991	Minsk, Soviet Union	15 km Individual F	World Cup	1st
18	1990–91	7 February 1991	Val di Fiemme, Italy	30 km Individual C	World Championships^{[1]}	2nd
19	1990–91	9 February 1991	Val di Fiemme, Italy	15 km Individual F	World Championships^{[1]}	3rd
20	1990–91	3 March 1991	Lahti, Finland	30 km Individual F	World Cup	2nd
21	1991–92	7 December 1991	Silver Star, Canada	10 km Individual C	World Cup	2nd
22	1991–92	4 January 1992	Kavgolovo, Russia	30 km Individual C	World Cup	3rd
23	1991–92	7 March 1992	Funäsdalen, Sweden	30 km Individual F	World Cup	3rd
24	1992–93	12 December 1992	Ramsau, Austria	10 km Individual F	World Cup	2nd
25	1992–93	13 December 1992	Ramsau, Austria	15 km Pursuit C	World Cup	3rd
26	1992–93	18 December 1992	Val di Fiemme, Italy	30 km Individual F	World Cup	1st
27	1992–93	16 January 1993	Bohinj, Slovenia	15 km Individual F	World Cup	1st
28	1992–93	20 February 1993	Falun, Sweden	30 km Individual C	World Championships^{[1]}	3rd
29	1992–93	22 February 1993	Falun, Sweden	10 km Individual C	World Championships^{[1]}	2nd
30	1992–93	24 February 1993	Falun, Sweden	15 km Pursuit F	World Championships^{[1]}	2nd
31	1992–93	7 March 1993	Lahti, Finland	30 km Individual F	World Cup	2nd
32	1993–94	11 December 1993	Santa Caterina, Italy	30 km Individual C	World Cup	1st
33	1993–94	21 December 1993	Toblach, Italy	10 km Individual C	World Cup	1st
34	1993–94	21 December 1993	Toblach, Italy	15 km Pursuit F	World Cup	1st
35	1993–94	9 January 1994	Kavgolovo, Russia	15 km Individual C	World Cup	1st
36	1993–94	15 January 1994	Oslo, Norway	15 km Individual F	World Cup	1st
37	1993–94	17 February 1994	Lillehammer, Norway	10 km Individual C	Olympic Games^{[1]}	2nd
38	1993–94	19 February 1994	Lillehammer, Norway	15 km Pursuit F	Olympic Games^{[1]}	2nd
39	1993–94	27 February 1994	Lillehammer, Norway	50 km Individual C	Olympic Games^{[1]}	1st
40	1993–94	5 March 1994	Lahti, Finland	15 km Individual F	World Cup	1st
41	1994–95	27 November 1994	Kiruna, Sweden	10 km Individual C	World Cup	2nd
42	1994–95	20 December 1994	Sappada, Italy	10 km Individual F	World Cup	3rd
43	1994–95	27 January 1995	Lahti, Finland	15 km Individual F	World Cup	1st
44	1994–95	29 January 1995	Lahti, Finland	15 km Pursuit C	World Cup	1st
45	1994–95	4 February 1995	Falun, Sweden	30 km Individual C	World Cup	3rd
46	1994–95	11 February 1995	Oslo, Norway	50 km Individual C	World Cup	1st
47	1994–95	9 March 1995	Thunder Bay, Canada	30 km Individual C	World Championships^{[1]}	1st
48	1994–95	11 March 1995	Thunder Bay, Canada	10 km Individual C	World Championships^{[1]}	1st
49	1994–95	13 March 1995	Thunder Bay, Canada	15 km Pursuit F	World Championships^{[1]}	1st
50	1994–95	19 March 1995	Thunder Bay, Canada	50 km Individual F	World Championships^{[1]}	3rd
51	1994–95	25 March 1995	Sapporo, Japan	15 km Individual F	World Cup	2nd
52	1995–96	26 November 1995	Vuokatti, Finland	10 km Individual C	World Cup	1st
53	1995–96	9 December 1995	Davos, Switzerland	30 km Individual C	World Cup	2nd
54	1995–96	13 December 1995	Brusson, Italy	15 km Individual F	World Cup	3rd
55	1995–96	16 December 1995	Santa Caterina, Italy	10 km Individual C	World Cup	2nd
56	1995–96	17 December 1995	Santa Caterina, Italy	15 km Pursuit F	World Cup	3rd
57	1995–96	9 January 1996	Štrbské Pleso, Slovakia	50 km Individual F	World Cup	1st
58	1995–96	13 January 1996	Nové Město, Czech Republic	15 km Individual C	World Cup	1st
59	1995–96	10 February 1996	Kavgolovo, Russia	15 km Individual C	World Cup	2nd
60	1995–96	24 February 1996	Trondheim, Norway	30 km Individual F	World Cup	1st
61	1995–96	9 March 1996	Falun, Sweden	10 km Individual F	World Cup	1st
62	1995–96	10 March 1996	Falun, Sweden	15 km Pursuit C	World Cup	1st
63	1996–97	19 January 1997	Lahti, Finland	30 km Individual C	World Cup	1st
64	1997–98	22 November 1997	Beitostølen, Norway	10 km Individual C	World Cup	2nd
65	1997–98	13 December 1997	Val di Fiemme, Italy	10 km Individual C	World Cup	3rd
66	1997–98	8 March 1998	Lahti, Finland	30 km Individual C	World Cup	1st

==== Team podiums ====
- 2 victories
- 8 podiums

No.	Season	Date	Location	Race	Level	Place	Teammates
1	1986–87	17 February 1987	Oberstdorf, West Germany	4 × 10 km Relay F	World Championships^{[1]}	2nd	Batyuk / Devyatyarov / Sakhnov
2	1987–88	24 February 1988	Calgary, Canada	4 × 10 km Relay F	Olympic Games^{[1]}	2nd	Sakhnov / Devyatyarov / Prokurorov
3	1988–89	5 March 1989	Oslo, Norway	4 × 10 km Relay F	World Cup	2nd	Badamshin / Sakhnov / Prokurorov
4	1988–89	12 March 1989	Falun, Sweden	4 × 10 km Relay C	World Cup	1st	Badamshin / Sakhnov / Prokurorov
5	1989–90	1 March 1990	Lahti, Finland	4 × 10 km Relay C/F	World Cup	2nd	Badamshin / Prokurorov / Botvinov
6	1989–90	16 March 1990	Vang, Norway	4 × 10 km Relay C	World Cup	3rd	Badamshin / Golubev / Botvinov
7	1991–92	28 February 1992	Lahti, Finland	4 × 10 km Relay F	World Cup	1st	Kirillov / Botvinov / Prokurorov
8	1991–92	8 March 1992	Funäsdalen, Sweden	4 × 10 km Relay C	World Cup	2nd	Kirillov / Botvinov / Prokurorov

Note: ^{1} Until the 1999 World Championships and the 1994 Winter Olympics, World Championship and Olympic races were included in the World Cup scoring system.

Olympic Games
Preceded by Yermakhan Ibraimov	Flagbearer for Kazakhstan; Nagano 1998	Succeeded by Yermakhan Ibraimov
