= Igor Badamshin =

Russian cross-country skier (1966–2014)

Personal information
- Nationality: Russia
- Born: 12 June 1966 Lesnoy, Sverdlovsk Oblast, Soviet Union
- Died: 24 January 2014 (aged 47) Wisconsin, United States

Sport
- Sport: Skiing

World Cup career
- Seasons: 9 – (1989–1997)
- Indiv. starts: 45
- Indiv. podiums: 1
- Indiv. wins: 0
- Team starts: 8
- Team podiums: 7
- Team wins: 1
- Overall titles: 0 – (15th in 1990)
- Discipline titles: 0
Medal record
Men's cross-country skiing
Representing Russia
World Championships
Bronze medal – third place	1993 Falun	4 × 10 km relay

Igor Gayniachmetovich Badamshin (Russian: Игорь Гайниахметович Бадамшин) (12 June 1966 – 24 January 2014) was a Soviet/Russian cross-country skier who competed from 1989 to 1997. He won a bronze medal in the 4 × 10 km relay at the 1993 FIS Nordic World Ski Championships in Falun and earned his best individual finishes of 5th twice at the world championships (1989: 50 km, 1993: 30 km).

Badamashin's best individual finish at the Winter Olympics was 14th at the 50 km event in 1994. His best finish was second place three times, earning it once in 1989 and twice in 1996.

In his later years, Badamshin resided with his wife, triple Olympic champion Nina Gavrylyuk, in the American state of Wisconsin. He died at the age of 47 in 2014, after suffering a heart attack.

== Cross-country skiing results ==
All results are sourced from the International Ski Federation (FIS).

=== Olympic Games ===
Year	Age	10 km	Pursuit	30 km	50 km	4 × 10 km relay
1994	27	—	—	26	14	—

=== World Championships ===
- 1 medal – (1 bronze)

Year	Age	10 km	15 km classical	15 km freestyle	Pursuit	30 km	50 km	4 × 10 km relay
1989	22	—N/a	—	—	—N/a	—	5	—
1991	24	8	—N/a	—	—N/a	13	—	5
1993	26	31	—N/a	—N/a	26	5	33	Bronze
1995	28	—	—N/a	—N/a	—	—	26	—

=== World Cup ===
==== Season standings ====
Season	Age			
Season	Age	Overall	Long Distance	Sprint
1989	22	18	—N/a	—N/a
1990	23	15	—N/a	—N/a
1991	24	23	—N/a	—N/a
1992	25	NC	—N/a	—N/a
1993	26	18	—N/a	—N/a
1994	27	37	—N/a	—N/a
1995	28	80	—N/a	—N/a
1996	29	58	—N/a	—N/a
1997	30	NC	NC	—

==== Individual podiums ====
- 1 podium

No.	Season	Date	Location	Race	Level	Place
1	1989–90	17 December 1989	Canmore, Canada	50 km Individual C	World Cup	2nd

==== Team podiums ====
- 1 victory
- 7 podiums

No.	Season	Date	Location	Race	Level	Place	Teammates
1	1988–89	5 March 1989	Oslo, Norway	4 × 10 km Relay F	World Cup	2nd	Smirnov / Sakhnov / Prokurorov
2	1988–89	12 March 1989	Falun, Sweden	4 × 10 km Relay C	World Cup	1st	Sakhnov / Prokurorov / Smirnov
3	1989–90	1 March 1990	Lahti, Finland	4 × 10 km Relay C/F	World Cup	2nd	Prokurorov / Botvinov / Smirnov
4	1989–90	16 March 1990	Vang, Norway	4 × 10 km Relay C	World Cup	3rd	Golubev / Botvinov / Smirnov
5	1990–91	1 March 1991	Lahti, Finland	4 × 10 km Relay C/F	World Cup	3rd	Botvinov / Plaksunov / Prokurorov
6	1992–93	26 February 1993	Falun, Sweden	4 × 10 km Relay C/F	World Championships^{[1]}	3rd	Kirillov / Prokurorov / Botvinov
7	1992–93	5 March 1993	Lahti, Finland	4 × 10 km Relay C	World Cup	2nd	Vorobyov / Prokurorov / Botvinov

Note: ^{1} Until the 1999 World Championships, World Championship races were included in the World Cup scoring system.
