= Andrey Kirillov =

Russian cross-country skier

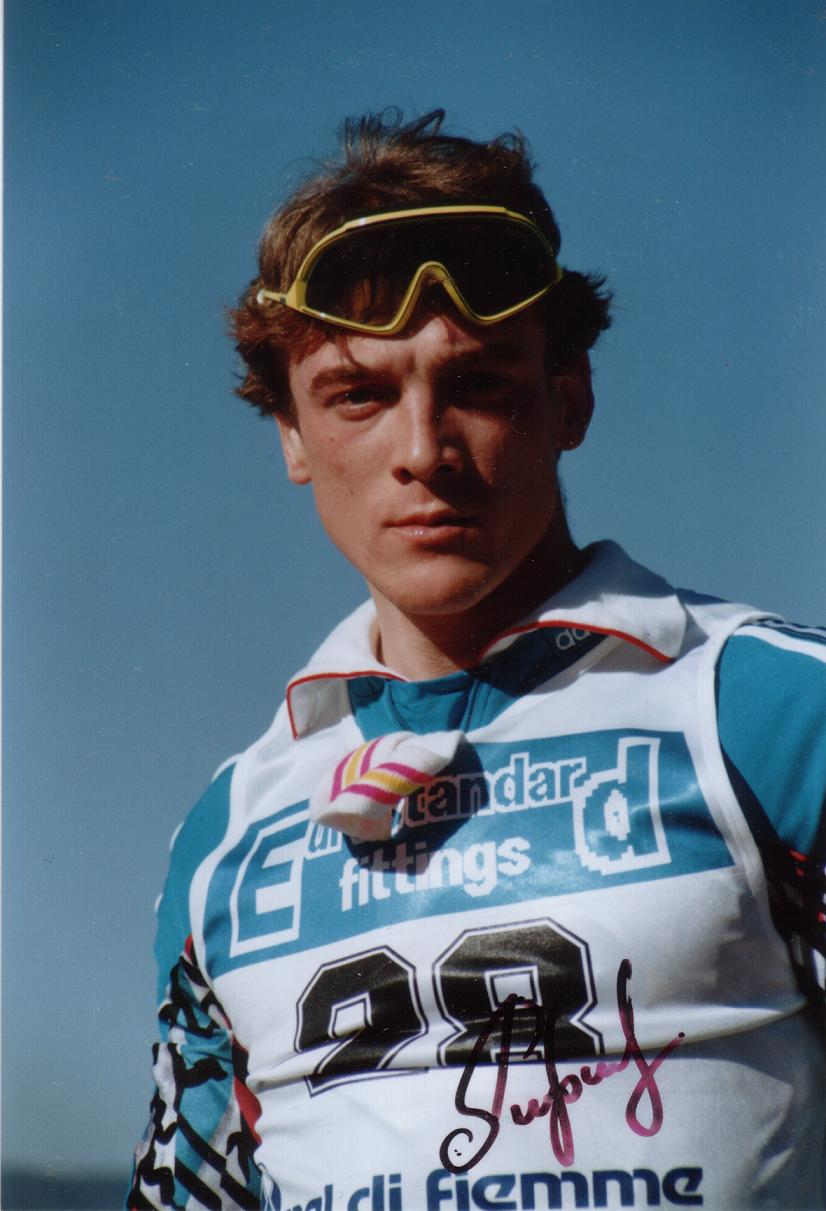
- Andrey Kirillov in 1991

Personal information
- Nationality: Russia
- Born: 13 January 1967 (age 59)

Sport
- Sport: Skiing

World Cup career
- Seasons: 6 – (1989–1994)
- Indiv. starts: 32
- Indiv. podiums: 0
- Team starts: 7
- Team podiums: 3
- Team wins: 1
- Overall titles: 0 – (22nd in 1990)
Medal record
Men's cross-country skiing
Representing Russia
World Championships
Bronze medal – third place	1993 Falun	4 × 10 km relay
Representing Soviet Union
Junior World Championships
Gold medal – first place	1986 Lake Placid	3 × 10 km relay
Gold medal – first place	1987 Asiago	3 × 10 km relay
Bronze medal – third place	1987 Asiago	10 km classical

Andrey Alexandrovich Kirillov (Russian: Андрей Алексадрович Кириллов); born 13 January 1967) is a Russian cross-country skier who competed in the early 1990s. He earned a bronze medal in the 4 × 10 km relay at the 1993 FIS Nordic World Ski Championships in Falun. He finished fifth in the 4 × 10 km relay at the 1992 Winter Olympics in Albertville as part of the Unified Team and repeated that finish as part of Russia at Lillehammer in 1994.

== Cross-country skiing results ==
All results are sourced from the International Ski Federation (FIS).

=== Olympic Games ===
Year	Age	10 km	Pursuit	30 km	50 km	4 × 10 km relay
1992	25	30	17	—	—	5
1994	27	13	16	—	—	5

=== World Championships ===
- 1 medal – (1 bronze)

Year	Age	10 km	15 km	Pursuit	30 km	50 km	4 × 10 km relay
1991	24	28	—	—N/a	16	—	—
1993	26	13	—N/a	12	—	—	Bronze

=== World Cup ===
==== Season standings ====
Season	Age	Overall
1989	22	50
1990	23	22
1991	24	21
1992	25	44
1993	26	25
1994	27	32

==== Team podiums ====
- 1 victory
- 3 podiums

No.	Season	Date	Location	Race	Level	Place	Teammates
1	1991–92	28 February 1992	Lahti, Finland	4 × 10 km Relay F	World Cup	1st	Botvinov / Prokurorov / Smirnov
2	1991–92	8 March 1992	Funäsdalen, Sweden	4 × 10 km Relay C	World Cup	2nd	Botvinov / Prokurorov / Smirnov
3	1992–93	26 February 1993	Falun, Sweden	4 × 10 km Relay C/F	World Championships^{[1]}	3rd	Badamshin / Prokurorov / Botvinov

Note: ^{1} Until the 1999 World Championships, World Championship races were included in the World Cup scoring system.
