= Achim Walcher =

Austrian cross-country skier

Personal information
- Nationality: Austria
- Born: 1 December 1967 (age 58) Schladming, Austria

Sport
- Sport: Skiing
- Club: WSV Ramsau

World Cup career
- Seasons: 1993–2003
- Indiv. starts: 79
- Indiv. podiums: 0
- Team starts: 22
- Team podiums: 7
- Team wins: 1
- Overall titles: 0 – (29th in 2000)
- Discipline titles: 0

Achim Walcher (born 1 December 1967) is an Austrian cross-country skier. He competed at the 1998 Winter Olympics and the 2002 Winter Olympics. He was disqualified from the 2002 Winter Olympics for using blood doping.

== Cross-country skiing results ==
All results are sourced from the International Ski Federation (FIS).

=== Olympic Games ===
Year	Age	10 km	15 km	Pursuit	30 km	50 km	Sprint	4 × 10 km relay
1998	30	23	—N/a	11	—	38	—N/a	9
2002	34	—N/a	—	DSQ	DSQ	—	—	—

=== World Championships ===
Year	Age	10 km	15 km	Pursuit	30 km	50 km	Sprint	4 × 10 km relay
1995	27	—	—N/a	—	61	—	—N/a	—
1997	29	35	—N/a	22	60	—	—N/a	13
1999	31	—	—N/a	—	19	10	—N/a	—
2001	33	—N/a	35	24	—	—	—	5
2003	35	—N/a	—	—	—	DSQ	—	DSQ

=== World Cup ===
==== Season standings ====
Season	Age				
Season	Age	Overall	Long Distance	Middle Distance	Sprint
1993	25	NC	—N/a	—N/a	—N/a
1994	26	NC	—N/a	—N/a	—N/a
1995	27	NC	—N/a	—N/a	—N/a
1996	28	41	—N/a	—N/a	—N/a
1997	29	87	NC	—N/a	—
1998	30	50	38	—N/a	68
1999	31	39	25	—N/a	66
2000	32	29	66	16	35
2001	33	40	—N/a	—N/a	—
2002	34	100	—N/a	—N/a	—
2003	35	DSQ	—N/a	—N/a	—

==== Team podiums ====
- 1 victory
- 7 podiums

No.	Season	Date	Location	Race	Level	Place	Teammates
1	1997–98	11 January 1998	Ramsau, Austria	4 × 10 km Relay C/F	World Cup	3rd	Botvinov / Stadlober / Hoffmann
2	1998–99	20 December 1998	Davos, Switzerland	4 × 10 km Relay C/F	World Cup	3rd	Marent / Stadlober / Botvinov
3	1999–00	28 November 1999	Kiruna, Sweden	4 × 10 km Relay F	World Cup	3rd	Marent / Botvinov / Urain
4	1999–00	13 January 2000	Nové Město, Czech Republic	4 × 10 km Relay C/F	World Cup	2nd	Marent / Botvinov / Hoffmann
5	1999–00	27 February 2000	Falun, Sweden	4 × 10 km Relay F	World Cup	3rd	Urain / Botvinov / Hoffmann
6	1999–00	5 March 2000	Lahti, Finland	4 × 10 km Relay C/F	World Cup	1st	Urain / Botvinov / Hoffmann
7	2000–01	9 December 2000	Santa Caterina, Italy	4 × 5 km Relay C/F	World Cup	2nd	Urain / Botvinov / Hoffmann
