= Vladimir Legotine =

Russian cross-country skier

Personal information
- Full name: Vladimir Engelsovich Legotine
- Nationality: Russia
- Born: 25 April 1970 (age 56) Syktyvkar, Komi ASSR, Russian SFSR, Soviet Union

Sport
- Sport: Skiing
- Club: Dynamo Syktyvkar

World Cup career
- Seasons: 9 – (1993–2000, 2003)
- Indiv. starts: 58
- Indiv. podiums: 0
- Team starts: 28
- Team podiums: 2
- Team wins: 1
- Overall titles: 0 – (34th in 1996)
- Discipline titles: 0
Medal record
Men's cross-country skiing
Representing Russia
Junior World Championships
Silver medal – second place	1990 Les Saisies	4 × 10 km relay

Vladimir Engelsovich Legotine (Russian: Владимир Энгельсович Леготин); born 25 April 1970) is a Russian cross-country skier who has competed since 1993. His best World Cup finish was ninth twice, earning them in 1995 and 1998.

Legotine also competed in two Winter Olympics, earning his best finish of ninth in the 30 km event at Nagano in 1998. His best finish at the FIS Nordic World Ski Championships was 10th in the 10 km + 15 km combined pursuit event at Thunder Bay in 1995.

== Cross-country skiing results ==
All results are sourced from the International Ski Federation (FIS).

=== Olympic Games ===
Year	Age	10 km	Pursuit	30 km	50 km	4 × 10 km relay
1994	23	18	17	—	—	—
1998	27	62	39	9	—	5

=== World Championships ===
Year	Age	10 km	15 km	Pursuit	30 km	50 km	Sprint	4 × 10 km relay
1993	22	33	—N/a	23	—	—	—N/a	—
1995	24	22	—N/a	10	19	—	—N/a	6
2003	32	—N/a	26	—	—	31	—	—

=== World Cup ===
==== Season standings ====
Season	Age				
Season	Age	Overall	Long Distance	Middle Distance	Sprint
1993	22	47	—N/a	—N/a	—N/a
1994	23	45	—N/a	—N/a	—N/a
1995	24	43	—N/a	—N/a	—N/a
1996	25	34	—N/a	—N/a	—N/a
1997	26	73	NC	—N/a	52
1998	27	42	28	—N/a	53
1999	28	55	32	—N/a	NC
2000	29	86	55	64	NC
2003	32	NC	—N/a	—N/a	—

==== Team podiums ====
- 1 victory – (1 RL)
- 2 podiums – (2 RL)

No.	Season	Date	Location	Race	Level	Place	Teammates
1	1997–98	7 December 1997	Santa Caterina, Italy	4 × 10 km Relay F	World Cup	1st	Pichugin / Prokurorov / Tchepikov
2	1997–98	6 March 1998	Lahti, Finland	4 × 10 km Relay C/F	World Cup	3rd	Prokurorov / Noutrikhin / Tchepikov
