= Aleksandr Vorobyov (skier) =

Russian cross-country skier

Personal information
- Nationality: Russia
- Born: 27 October 1969 (age 56)

Sport
- Sport: Skiing

World Cup career
- Seasons: 4 – (1993–1996)
- Indiv. starts: 27
- Indiv. podiums: 0
- Team starts: 2
- Team podiums: 1
- Team wins: 0
- Overall titles: 0 – (50th in 1994)

Aleksandr Vorobyov (born 27 October 1969) is a Russian cross-country skier. He competed in the men's 50 kilometre classical event at the 1994 Winter Olympics.

== Cross-country skiing results ==
All results are sourced from the International Ski Federation (FIS).

=== Olympic Games ===
Year	Age	10 km	Pursuit	30 km	50 km	4 × 10 km relay
1994	24	—	—	26	17	—

=== World Championships ===
Year	Age	10 km	Pursuit	30 km	50 km	4 × 10 km relay
1993	23	20	15	—	20	—

=== World Cup ===
==== Season standings ====
Season	Age	
Season	Age	Overall
1993	23	54
1994	24	50
1995	25	NC
1996	25	51

==== Team podiums ====
- 1 podium

No.	Season	Date	Location	Race	Level	Place	Teammates
1	1992–93	5 March 1993	Lahti, Finland	4 × 10 km Relay C	World Cup	2nd	Badamshin / Prokurorov / Botvinov
