= Vyacheslav Plaksunov =

Belarusian cross-country skier (born 1968)

Personal information
- Nationality: Belarus
- Born: 6 March 1968 (age 58) Syanno, Byelorussian SSR, Soviet Union

Sport
- Sport: Skiing

World Cup career
- Seasons: 1991, 1993–1994, 1997–1998
- Indiv. starts: 36
- Indiv. podiums: 0
- Team starts: 6
- Team podiums: 1
- Team wins: 0
- Overall titles: 0 – (21st in 1991)
- Discipline titles: 0

Vyacheslav Plaksunov (born 6 March 1968) is a Belarusian cross-country skier. Master of sports of international class. He competed at the 1994 Winter Olympics and the 1998 Winter Olympics.

== Cross-country skiing results ==
All results are sourced from the International Ski Federation (FIS).

=== Olympic Games ===
Year	Age	10 km	Pursuit	30 km	50 km	4 × 10 km relay
1994	25	53	21	27	—	12
1998	29	—	—	—	DNF	14

=== World Championships ===
Year	Age	10 km	15 km	Pursuit	30 km	50 km	4 × 10 km relay
1991	22	—	8	—N/a	—	35	5
1993	24	41	—N/a	22	—	22	7
1997	28	91	—N/a	65	31	—	7

=== World Cup ===
==== Season standings ====
Season	Age			
Season	Age	Overall	Long Distance	Sprint
1991	23	21	—N/a	—N/a
1993	25	32	—N/a	—N/a
1994	26	39	—N/a	—N/a
1997	29	71	NC	50
1998	30	100	67	NC

==== Team podiums ====
- 1 podium

No.	Season	Date	Location	Race	Level	Place	Teammates
1	1990–91	1 March 1991	Lahti, Finland	4 × 10 km Relay C/F	World Cup	3rd	Botvinov / Badamshin / Prokurorov
