= Sergei Tchepikov =

Russian athlete and politician (1967–2026)

Sergei Tchepikov MP
- Сергей Чепиков
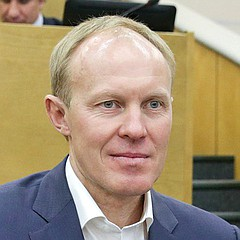
- Tchepikov in 2018

Member of the State Duma for Sverdlovsk Oblast
- In office 5 October 2016 – 17 September 2026
- Preceded by: constituency re-established
- Constituency: Beryozovsky (No. 170)

Personal details
- Born: 30 January 1967 Khor, Khabarovsk Krai, Russian SFSR, USSR
- Died: 17 September 2026 (aged 59) Moscow, Russia
- Party: United Russia
- Education: Ural State Technical University
- Sports career
- Height: 1.82 m (6 ft 0 in)
- Weight: 75 kg (165 lb)

Professional information
- Sport: Biathlon; Cross-country skiing
- Club: Dynamo
- World Cup debut: 22 January 1987; 26 November 1995

Olympic Games
- Teams: 5 (1988, 1992, 1994, 2002, 2006); 1 (1998)
- Medals: 6 (2 gold)

World Championships
- Teams: 8 (1989, 1990, 1991, 1993, 2003, 2004, 2005, 2006); 2 (1995, 1997)
- Medals: 14 (2 gold)

World Cup
- Seasons: 14 (1986/87–1993/94, 2001/02–2006/07)
- Individual victories: 6
- Individual podiums: 18
- Overall titles: 2 (1989–90, 1990–91)
- Discipline titles: 1: 1 Sprint (1990–91)
Medal record
Men's biathlon
Representing Russia
Olympic Games
| Gold medal – first place | 1994 Lillehammer | 10 km sprint |
| Silver medal – second place | 1994 Lillehammer | 4 × 7.5 km relay |
| Silver medal – second place | 2006 Turin | 4 × 7.5 km relay |
World Championships
| Gold medal – first place | 2006 Pokljuka | Mixed relay |
| Silver medal – second place | 1993 Borovets | Team event |
| Silver medal – second place | 1993 Borovets | 4 × 7.5 km relay |
| Silver medal – second place | 2003 Khanty-Mansiysk | 4 × 7.5 km relay |
| Silver medal – second place | 2005 Hochfilzen | 12.5 km pursuit |
| Silver medal – second place | 2005 Hochfilzen | 4 × 7.5 km relay |
| Silver medal – second place | 2005 Khanty-Mansiysk | Mixed relay |
| Bronze medal – third place | 1993 Borovets | 20 km individual |
Representing the Unified Team
Olympic Games
| Silver medal – second place | 1992 Albertville | 4 × 7.5 km relay |
Representing the Soviet Union
Olympic Games
| Gold medal – first place | 1988 Calgary | 4 × 7.5 km relay |
| Bronze medal – third place | 1988 Calgary | 10 km sprint |
World Championships
| Gold medal – first place | 1989 Feistritz an der Drau | Team event |
| Silver medal – second place | 1989 Feistritz an der Drau | 4 × 7.5 km relay |
| Silver medal – second place | 1990 Minsk | 20 km individual |
| Silver medal – second place | 1991 Lahti | 4 × 7.5 km relay |
| Bronze medal – third place | 1990 Oslo | 10 km sprint |
| Bronze medal – third place | 1991 Lahti | Team event |

Sergei Vladimirovich Tchepikov (Note: Also transliterated as Sergey Vladimirovich Chepikov) (

Russian: Серге́й Влади́мирович Че́пиков; 30 January 1967 – 17 September 2026) was a Russian politician and Soviet-Russian biathlete and cross-country skier who competed at six Winter Olympics, five in biathlon (1988, 1992, 1994, 2002 and 2006) and one in cross-country skiing (1998). His last Olympic performance was a silver medal in the 4 × 7.5 km relay at the 2006 Winter Olympics in Turin.

Tchepikov possessed two World Cup titles (1989/90, 1990/91). He had 25 podium finishes, six in first place, thirteen in second, and came third six times. In the Olympics, Tchepikov achieved two gold, three silver, and one bronze medals. In the World Championships he won 14 medals, however only two gold medals.

Tchepikov died from cancer on 17 September 2026, at the age of 59.

== Biathlon results ==
All results are sourced from the International Biathlon Union.

=== Olympic Games ===
6 medals (2 gold, 3 silver, 1 bronze)

| Event | Individual | Sprint | Pursuit | Mass start | Relay |
|---|---|---|---|---|---|
| (Canada) 1988 Calgary | 4th | Bronze | —N/a | —N/a | Gold |
| (France) 1992 Albertville | 10th | 4th | —N/a | —N/a | Silver |
| (Norway) 1994 Lillehammer | 8th | Gold | —N/a | —N/a | Silver |
| (United States) 2002 Salt Lake City | 8th | — | — | —N/a | 4th |
| (Italy) 2006 Turin | 4th | 23rd | DNS | 5th | Silver |

*Pursuit was added as an event in 2002, with mass start being added in 2006.

=== World Championships ===
14 medals (2 gold, 9 silver, 3 bronze)

| Event | Individual | Sprint | Pursuit | Mass start | Team | Relay | Mixed relay |
|---|---|---|---|---|---|---|---|
| (Austria) 1989 Feistritz | 7th | 7th | —N/a | —N/a | Gold | Silver | —N/a |
| (Soviet Union) 1990 Minsk | Silver | Bronze | —N/a | —N/a | 4th | 5th | —N/a |
| (Finland) 1991 Lahti | 5th | 15th | —N/a | —N/a | Bronze | Silver | —N/a |
| (Bulgaria) 1993 Borovets | Bronze | 5th | —N/a | —N/a | Silver | Silver | —N/a |
| (Russia) 2003 Khanty-Mansiysk | — | 52nd | 32nd | 10th | —N/a | Silver | —N/a |
| (Germany) 2004 Oberhof | 40th | — | — | 24th | —N/a | — | —N/a |
| (Austria) 2005 Hochfilzen | 32nd | 4th | Silver | 8th | —N/a | Silver | Silver |
| (Slovenia) 2006 Pokljuka | —N/a | —N/a | —N/a | —N/a | —N/a | —N/a | Gold |

*During Olympic seasons competitions are only held for those events not included in the Olympic program.
**Team was removed as an event in 1998, and pursuit was added in 1997 with mass start being added in 1999 and the mixed relay in 2005.

=== Individual victories ===
7 victories (3 In., 4 Sp.)

| Season | Date | Location | Discipline | Level |
|---|---|---|---|---|
| 1988–89; 1 victory (1 In) | 9 March 1989 | (Sweden) Östersund | 20 km individual | Biathlon World Cup |
| 1989–90; 1 victory (1 In) | 25 January 1990 | (West Germany) Ruhpolding | 20 km individual | Biathlon World Cup |
| 1990–91; 3 victories (1 In, 2 Sp) | 13 December 1990 | (France) Albertville | 20 km individual | Biathlon World Cup |
| 1990–91; 3 victories (1 In, 2 Sp) | 15 December 1990 | (France) Albertville | 10 km sprint | Biathlon World Cup |
| 1990–91; 3 victories (1 In, 2 Sp) | 26 January 1991 | (Italy) Antholz-Anterselva | 10 km sprint | Biathlon World Cup |
| 2003–04; 1 victory (1 Sp) | 24 January 2004 | (Italy) Antholz-Anterselva | 10 km sprint | Biathlon World Cup |

*Results are from UIPMB and IBU races which include the Biathlon World Cup, Biathlon World Championships and the Winter Olympic Games.

== Cross-country skiing results ==
All results are sourced from the International Ski Federation (FIS).

=== Olympic Games ===
| Year | Age | 10 km | Pursuit | 30 km | 50 km | 4 × 10 km relay |
|---|---|---|---|---|---|---|
| 1998 | 31 | 22 | 9 | 32 | — | 5 |

=== World Championships ===
| Year | Age | 10 km | Pursuit | 30 km | 50 km | 4 × 10 km relay |
|---|---|---|---|---|---|---|
| 1995 | 28 | 35 | 19 | — | 13 | 6 |
| 1997 | 30 | 16 | 14 | — | 18 | 4 |

=== World Cup ===
==== Season standings ====
| Season | Age | | | |
| Season | Age | Overall | Long Distance | Sprint |
|---|---|---|---|---|
| 1995 | 28 | 50 | —N/a | —N/a |
| 1996 | 29 | 19 | —N/a | —N/a |
| 1997 | 30 | 21 | 22 | 31 |
| 1998 | 31 | 49 | 71 | 40 |

==== Team podiums ====
- 1 victory
- 3 podiums

| No. | Season | Date | Location | Race | Level | Place | Teammates |
|---|---|---|---|---|---|---|---|
| 1 | 1995–96 | 1 March 1996 | Lahti, Finland | 4 × 10 km Relay C/F | World Cup | 2nd | Botvinov / Tchernych / Prokurorov |
| 2 | 1997–98 | 7 December 1997 | Santa Caterina, Italy | 4 × 10 km Relay F | World Cup | 1st | Pitchouguine / Legotine / Prokurorov |
| 3 | 1997–98 | 6 March 1998 | Lahti, Finland | 4 × 10 km Relay C/F | World Cup | 3rd | Legotine / Prokurorov / Noutrikhin |

== Politics ==
In 2016, he was elected to the State Duma running as a United Russia candidate.

=== Sanctions ===
Tchepikov was sanctioned by the UK government in 2022 in relation to the Russo-Ukrainian War.
