= Renate Roider =

Austrian cross-country skier

Personal information
- Nationality: Austria
- Born: 22 December 1971 (age 54) Salzburg, Austria

Sport
- Sport: Skiing
- Club: TVN Schneegattern

World Cup career
- Seasons: 1993–2001
- Indiv. starts: 46
- Indiv. podiums: 0
- Team starts: 0
- Team podiums: 0
- Overall titles: 0 – (36th in 1998)
- Discipline titles: 0

Renate Roider (born 22 December 1971) is an Austrian cross-country skier. She competed in two events at the 1998 Winter Olympics.

== Cross-country skiing results ==
All results are sourced from the International Ski Federation (FIS).

=== Olympic Games ===
Year	Age	5 km	15 km	Pursuit	30 km	4 × 5 km relay
1992	20	42	26	DNS	—	—

=== World Championships ===
Year	Age	5 km	15 km	Pursuit	30 km	4 × 5 km relay
1995	23	33	31	34	DNF	—
1997	25	15	—	DNF	12	—
1999	27	26	—	31	20	—

=== World Cup ===
==== Season standings ====
Season	Age				
Season	Age	Overall	Long Distance	Middle Distance	Sprint
1993	21	NC	—N/a	—N/a	—N/a
1994	22	NC	—N/a	—N/a	—N/a
1995	23	NC	—N/a	—N/a	—N/a
1996	24	NC	—N/a	—N/a	—N/a
1997	25	43	NC	—N/a	53
1998	26	36	40	—N/a	34
1999	27	57	42	—N/a	57
2000	28	NC	NC	NC	NC
2001	29	NC	—N/a	—N/a	—
