= Maksim Pichugin (skier) =

Russian cross-country skier (1974–2025)

Personal information
- Nationality: Russia
- Born: 30 October 1974 Novokuznetsk, Soviet Union
- Died: 24 July 2025 (aged 50) Novokuznetsk, Russia

Sport
- Sport: Skiing

World Cup career
- Seasons: 6 – (1994–1998, 2000)
- Indiv. starts: 27
- Indiv. podiums: 0
- Team starts: 13
- Team podiums: 1
- Team wins: 1
- Overall titles: 0 – (50th in 1997)
- Discipline titles: 0

Maksim Borisovich Pichugin (Russian: Максим Борисович Пичугин; 30 October 1974 – 24 July 2025) was a Russian cross-country skier. He competed in the men's 30 kilometre classical event at the 1998 Winter Olympics.

Pichugin died on 24 July 2025, at the age of 50.

== Cross-country skiing results ==
All results are sourced from the International Ski Federation (FIS).

=== Olympic Games ===
Year	Age	10 km	Pursuit	30 km	50 km	4 × 10 km relay
1998	23	—	—	39	37	—

=== World Championships ===
Year	Age	10 km	Pursuit	30 km	50 km	4 × 10 km relay
1997	22	—	—	13	41	4

=== World Cup ===
==== Season standings ====
Season	Age				
Season	Age	Overall	Long Distance	Middle Distance	Sprint
1995	20	84	—N/a	—N/a	—N/a
1996	21	83	—N/a	—N/a	—N/a
1997	22	50	38	—N/a	NC
1998	23	71	NC	—N/a	59
2000	25	NC	NC	—	—

==== Team podiums ====
- 1 victory – (1 RL)
- 1 podium – (1 RL)

No.	Season	Date	Location	Race	Level	Place	Teammates
1	1997–98	7 December 1997	Santa Caterina, Italy	4 × 10 km Relay F	World Cup	1st	Legotine / Prokurorov / Tchepikov
