= Mikhail Botvinov =

Russian-Austrian cross-country skier

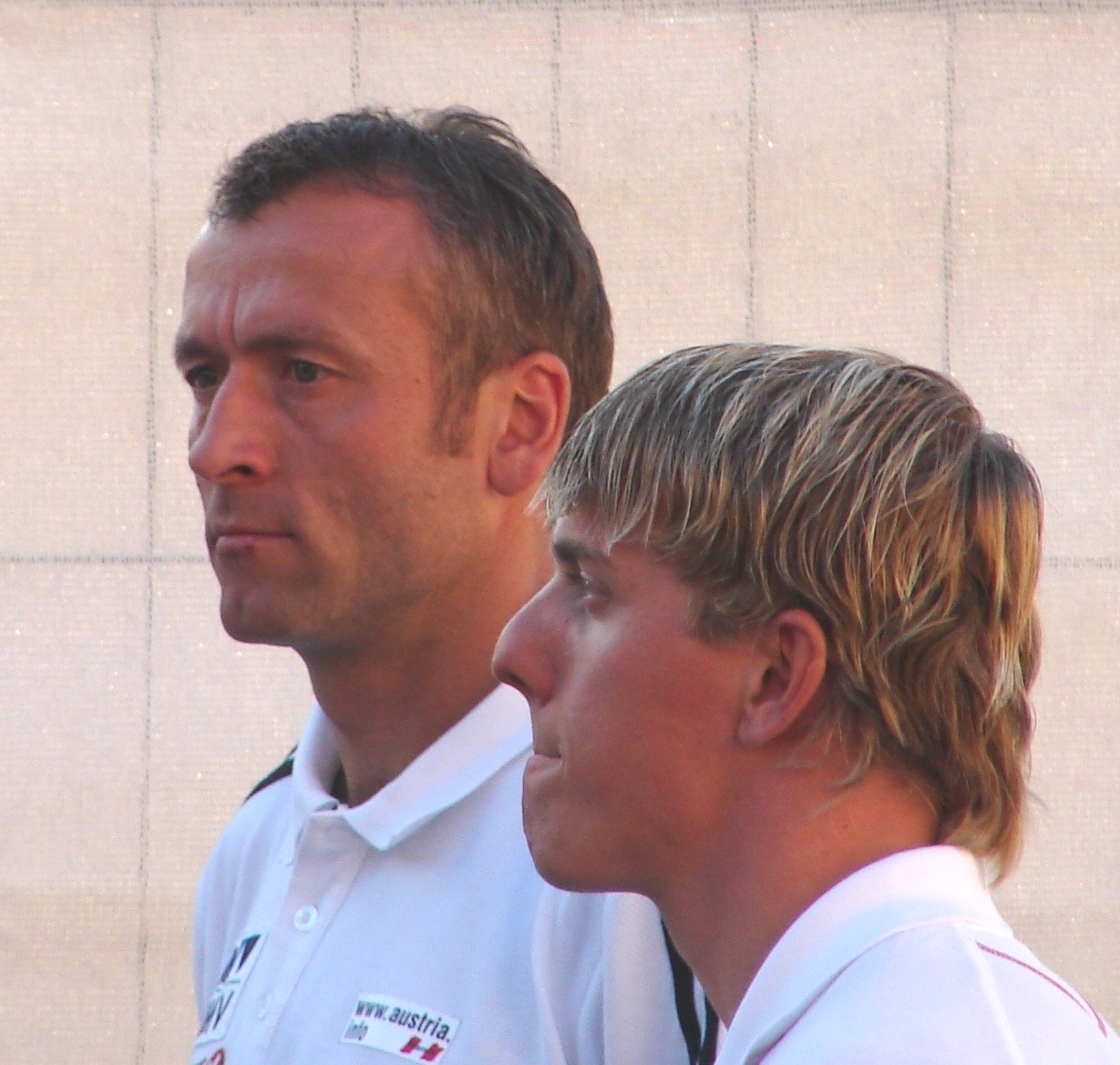
- Mikhail Botvinov (left)

Personal information
- Full name: Mikhail Viktorovich Botvinov
- Nationality: Austria
- Born: 17 November 1967 (age 58) Lidinka, Russian SFSR, Soviet Union

Sport
- Sport: Skiing

World Cup career
- Seasons: 18 – (1989–1996, 1998–2007)
- Indiv. starts: 171
- Indiv. podiums: 19
- Indiv. wins: 2
- Team starts: 42
- Team podiums: 17
- Team wins: 4
- Overall titles: 0 – (2nd in 1999)
- Discipline titles: 1 – (1 LD: 1999)
Medal record
Men's cross-country skiing
Representing Austria
Olympic Games
Silver medal – second place	2002 Salt Lake City	30 km freestyle
Bronze medal – third place	2006 Turin	50 km freestyle
World Championships
Gold medal – first place	1999 Ramsau	4 × 10 km relay
Bronze medal – third place	1999 Ramsau	50 km classical
Representing Russia
World Championships
Bronze medal – third place	1993 Falun	4 × 10 km relay

Mikhail Viktorovich Botvinov (Russian: Михаил Викторович Ботвинов); born 17 November 1967 in Lidinka, Soviet Union) is a Russian-born Austrian cross-country skier who competed from 1990 to 2007 for both Russia (until 1996) and Austria (since 1997).

== Career ==
He won two medals at the Winter Olympics with a silver in the men's 30 km freestyle mass start event in 2002 and a bronze in the men's 50 km freestyle mass start in 2006 (Both for Austria). He also competed for the Unified Team in the 1992 Winter Olympics and for Russia in the 1994 Winter Olympics.

Botvinov also won the 50 km event at the Holmenkollen Ski Festival in 1999, becoming the first Austrian to win the prestigious cross country event. He also won the Vasaloppet event in Sweden two years earlier.

His biggest successes were at the FIS Nordic World Ski Championships, where he won three medals. He won a bronze in 1993 for Russia in the 4 × 10 km relay. In 1999, representing Austria, won a gold in the 4 × 10 km relay and a bronze in the 50 km.

Botvinov emigrated from Russia to Austria in 1996 and was forced to sit out both the 1996–97 FIS World Cup Season and the 1998 Winter Olympics in Nagano until he could his citizenship status clarified, but returned to form in 1998. He also encountered controversy with his teammate Christian Hoffmann regarding blood doping in 2002, though both were cleared by the International Olympic Committee on 9 April 2002.

Botvinov retired after the 2006–07 World Cup season.

== Cross-country skiing results ==
All results are sourced from the International Ski Federation (FIS).

=== Olympic Games ===
- 2 medals – (1 silver, 1 bronze)

Year	Age	10 km	15 km	Pursuit	30 km	50 km	Sprint	4 × 10 km relay	Team sprint
1992	24	11	—N/a	15	12	28	—N/a	5	—N/a
1994	26	4	—N/a	5	4	9	—N/a	5	—N/a
2002	34	—N/a	—	9	Silver	5	—	4	—N/a
2006	38	—N/a	—	7	—N/a	Bronze	—	—	—

=== World Championships ===
- 3 medals – (1 gold, 2 bronze)

Year	Age	10 km	15 km classical	15 km freestyle	Pursuit	30 km	50 km	Sprint	4 × 10 km relay	Team sprint
1989	21	—N/a	37	—	—N/a	16	—	—N/a	—	—N/a
1991	23	18	—N/a	28	—N/a	8	—	—N/a	—	—N/a
1993	25	—	—N/a	—N/a	—	40	8	—N/a	Bronze	—N/a
1995	27	10	—N/a	—N/a	35	—	29	—N/a	6	—N/a
1999	31	21	—N/a	—N/a	DNF	18	Bronze	—N/a	Gold	—N/a
2001	33	—N/a	28	—N/a	—	13	DNF	5	—	—N/a
2003	35	—N/a	13	—N/a	—	12	13	—	DSQ	—N/a
2005	37	—N/a	—N/a	—	8	—N/a	8	—	5	—
2007	39	—N/a	—N/a	DNS	—	—N/a	DNF	—	DSQ	—

=== World Cup ===
==== Season standings ====
Season	Age	Discipline standings					Ski Tour standings
Season	Age	Overall	Distance	Long Distance	Middle Distance	Sprint	Tour de Ski
1989	21	NC	—N/a	—N/a	—N/a	—N/a	—N/a
1990	22	30	—N/a	—N/a	—N/a	—N/a	—N/a
1991	23	18	—N/a	—N/a	—N/a	—N/a	—N/a
1992	24	6	—N/a	—N/a	—N/a	—N/a	—N/a
1993	25	7	—N/a	—N/a	—N/a	—N/a	—N/a
1994	26	16	—N/a	—N/a	—N/a	—N/a	—N/a
1995	27	10	—N/a	—N/a	—N/a	—N/a	—N/a
1996	28	7	—N/a	—N/a	—N/a	—N/a	—N/a
1998	30	4	—N/a	14	—N/a	4	—N/a
1999	31	2nd place, silver medalist(s)	—N/a	1st place, gold medalist(s)	—N/a	7	—N/a
2000	32	9	—N/a	3rd place, bronze medalist(s)	13	NC	—N/a
2001	33	10	—N/a	—N/a	—N/a	NC	—N/a
2002	34	53	—N/a	—N/a	—N/a	—	—N/a
2003	35	61	—N/a	—N/a	—N/a	—	—N/a
2004	36	37	25	—N/a	—N/a	—	—N/a
2005	37	52	30	—N/a	—N/a	—	—N/a
2006	38	64	42	—N/a	—N/a	—	—N/a
2007	39	108	63	—N/a	—N/a	—	—

==== Individual podiums ====
- 2 victories
- 19 podiums

No.	Season	Date	Location	Race	Level	Place
1	1991–92	14 March 1992	Vang, Norway	50 km Individual C	World Cup	2nd
2	1992–93	18 December 1992	Val di Fiemme, Italy	30 km Individual F	World Cup	2nd
3	1992–93	3 January 1993	Kavgolovo, Russia	30 km Individual C	World Cup	3rd
4	1994–95	11 February 1995	Oslo, Norway	50 km Individual C	World Cup	3rd
5	1997–98	14 December 1997	Val di Fiemme, Italy	15 km Pursuit F	World Cup	3rd
6	1997–98	10 January 1998	Ramsau, Austria	30 km Individual F	World Cup	3rd
7	1997–98	11 March 1998	Falun, Sweden	10 km Individual F	World Cup	2nd
8	1998–99	12 December 1998	Toblach, Italy	10 km Individual F	World Cup	2nd
9	1998–99	19 December 1998	Davos, Switzerland	30 km Individual C	World Cup	3rd
10	1998–99	12 January 1999	Nové Město, Czech Republic	30 km Individual F	World Cup	1st
11	1998–99	14 January 1999	Seefeld, Austria	10 km Individual F	World Cup	2nd
12	1998–99	28 February 1999	Ramsau, Austria	50 km Individual C	World Championships^{[1]}	3rd
13	1998–99	13 March 1999	Falun, Sweden	30 km Individual C	World Cup	2nd
14	1998–99	20 March 1999	Oslo, Norway	50 km Individual C	World Cup	1st
15	1999–00	5 February 2000	Lillehammer, Norway	10 km + 10 km Pursuit C/F	World Cup	3rd
16	1999–00	11 March 2000	Oslo, Norway	50 km Individual C	World Cup	3rd
17	2000–01	13 January 2001	Soldier Hollow, United States	15 km Individual C	World Cup	2nd
18	2000–01	4 March 2001	Kavgolovo, Russia	15 km Individual F	World Cup	2nd
19	2000–01	25 March 2001	Kuopio, Finland	60 km Mass Start F	World Cup	3rd

==== Team podiums ====
- 4 victories
- 17 podiums

No.	Season	Date	Location	Race	Level	Place	Teammates
1	1989–90	1 March 1990	Lahti, Finland	4 × 10 km Relay C/F	World Cup	2nd	Badamshin / Prokurorov / Smirnov
2	1989–90	16 March 1990	Vang, Norway	4 × 10 km Relay C	World Cup	3rd	Badamshin / Golubev / Smirnov
3	1990–91	1 March 1991	Lahti, Finland	4 × 10 km Relay C/F	World Cup	3rd	Badamshin / Plaksunov / Prokurorov
4	1991–92	28 February 1992	Lahti, Finland	4 × 10 km Relay F	World Cup	1st	Kirillov / Prokurorov / Smirnov
5	1991–92	8 March 1992	Funäsdalen, Sweden	4 × 10 km Relay C	World Cup	2nd	Kirillov / Prokurorov / Smirnov
6	1992–93	25 February 1993	Falun, Sweden	4 × 10 km Relay C/F	World Championships^{[1]}	3rd	Kirillov / Badamshin / Prokurorov
7	1992–93	5 March 1993	Lahti, Finland	4 × 10 km Relay C	World Cup	2nd	Vorobyov / Badamshin / Prokurorov
8	1995–96	1 March 1996	Lahti, Finland	4 × 10 km Relay C/F	World Cup	2nd	Tchepikov / Tchernych / Prokurorov
9	1997–98	11 January 1998	Ramsau, Austria	4 × 10 km Relay C/F	World Cup	3rd	Stadlober / Hoffmann / Walcher
10	1998–99	20 December 1998	Davos, Switzerland	4 × 10 km Relay C/F	World Cup	3rd	Marent / Stadlober / Walcher
11	1998–99	10 January 1999	Nové Město, Czech Republic	4 × 10 km Relay C/F	World Cup	1st	Gandler / Marent / Hoffmann
12	1998–99	26 February 1999	Ramsau, Austria	4 × 10 km Relay C/F	World Championships^{[1]}	1st	Gandler / Stadlober / Hoffmann
13	1999–00	28 November 1999	Kiruna, Sweden	4 × 10 km Relay F	World Cup	3rd	Marent / Walcher / Urain
14	1999–00	13 January 2000	Nové Město, Czech Republic	4 × 10 km Relay C/F	World Cup	2nd	Marent / Walcher / Hoffmann
15	1999–00	27 February 2000	Falun, Sweden	4 × 10 km Relay F	World Cup	3rd	Urain / Walcher / Hoffmann
16	1999–00	5 March 2000	Lahti, Finland	4 × 10 km Relay C/F	World Cup	1st	Urain / Walcher / Hoffmann
17	2000–01	9 December 2000	Santa Caterina, Italy	4 × 5 km Relay C/F	World Cup	2nd	Urain / Walcher / Hoffmann

Note: ^{1} Until the 1999 World Championships, World Championship races were included in the World Cup scoring system.
