= Mishin =

Mishin (Russian: Мишин; masculine) or Mishina (Russian: Мишина; feminine) is a Russian surname that is derived from Misha, a diminutive for the male given name Mikhail, and literally means Misha's. Mishina is also an unrelated Japanese surname. Notable people with the surname include:

== Mishin ==
- Alexei Mishin (born 1941), figure skater and coach
- Alexei Mishin (wrestler) (born 1979)
- Andrey Mishin (born 1979), boxer
- Dmitry Mishin (1919–1998), physicist
- Sergey Mishin (1958–2025), weightlifter
- Vasily Mishin (1917–2001), engineer
- Vladimir Mishin (1888–1942), footballer

== Mishina ==
- Anastasia Mishina, Russian pair skater
- Daria Mishina, Russian ice hockey player
- Irina Mishina, Russian journalist and television presenter
- Larisa Mishina, Russian ice hockey player
- Masumi Mishina, Japanese softball player
- Shōei Mishina, Japanese historian
- Tatiana Mishina, Soviet figure skater
- Yuji Mishina, Japanese molecular biologist

== Fictional characters ==
- Eikichi Mishina, character in the video game Persona 2
