= Reinhard Neuner =

Austrian biathlete (born 1969)

Personal information
- Nationality: Austrian
- Born: 4 February 1969 (age 56) Mieming, Austria

Sport
- Sport: Biathlon

Reinhard Neuner (born 4 February 1969) is an Austrian biathlete. He competed in the men's sprint event at the 1998 Winter Olympics.
