= Vladimir Mishin =

Russian footballer

Personal information
- Full name: Vladimir Konstantinovich Mishin
- Date of birth: 1888
- Date of death: 1942 (aged 53–54)
- Position: Defender

Senior career*
Years	Team	Apps	(Gls)
1909–1913	KS Orekhovo Orekhovo-Zuyevo		

International career
1913	Russian Empire	1	(0)
- * Club domestic league appearances and goals

Vladimir Konstantinovich Mishin (Russian: Владимир Константинович Мишин) (born 1888; died 1942) was an association football player.

== International career ==
Mishin played his only game for the Russian Empire on 4 May 1913 in a friendly against Sweden.
