= Michael Müller (bobsleigh) =

Austrian bobsledder

Personal information
- Nationality: Austrian
- Born: 29 August 1976 (age 49) Vöcklabruck, Austria

Sport
- Sport: Bobsleigh

Michael Müller (born 29 August 1976) is an Austrian bobsledder. He competed at the 1998 Winter Olympics and the 2002 Winter Olympics.
