= Alois Stadlober =

Austrian cross-country skier

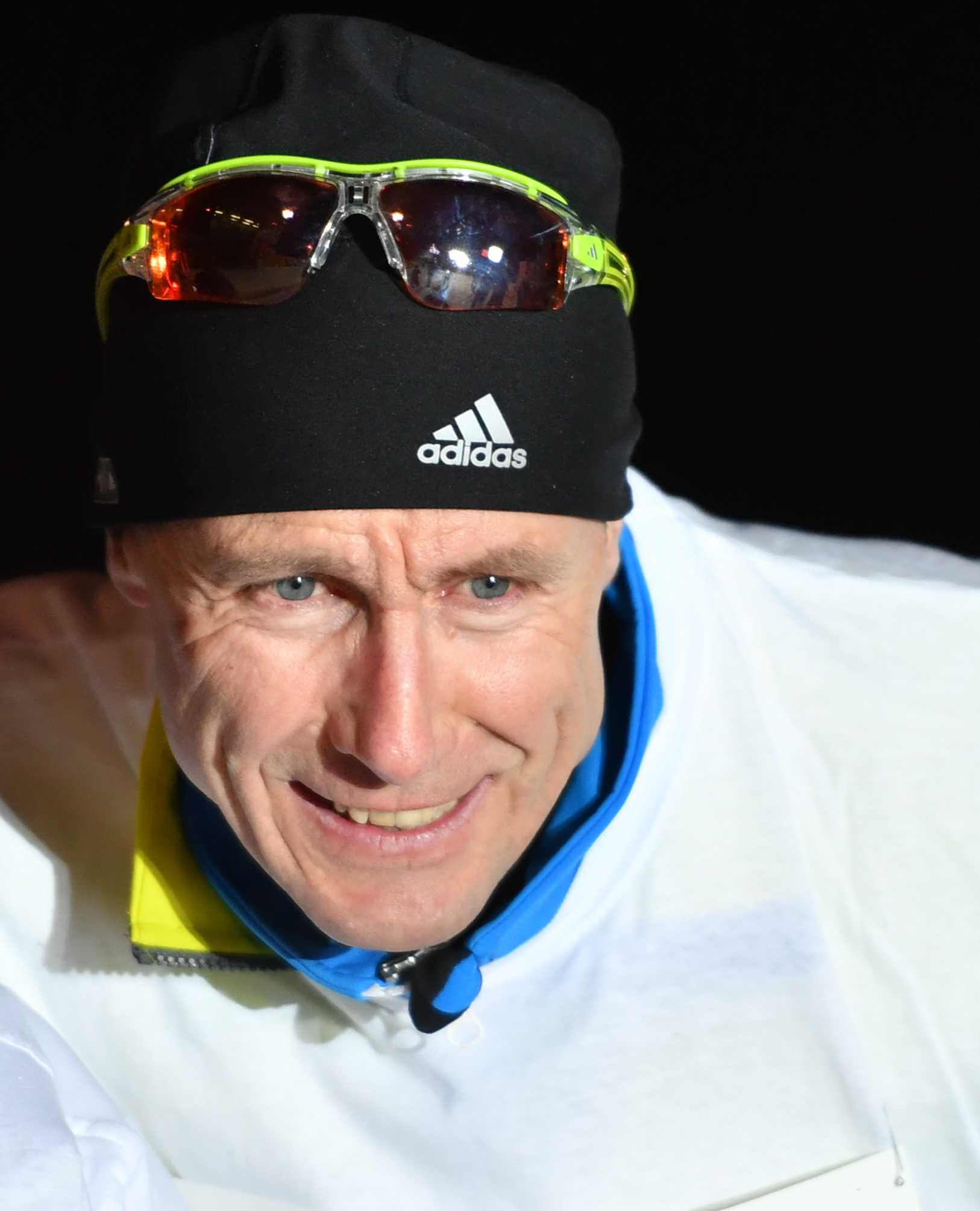
- Stadlober in 2016

Personal information
- Nationality: Austria
- Born: April 11, 1962 (age 64) Judenburg, Austria

Sport
- Sport: Skiing
- Club: SC Radstadt

World Cup career
- Seasons: 14 – (1983–1984, 1988–1999)
- Indiv. starts: 90
- Indiv. podiums: 2
- Indiv. wins: 0
- Team starts: 21
- Team podiums: 3
- Team wins: 1
- Overall titles: 0 – (11th in 1999)
- Discipline titles: 0
Medal record
Men's cross-country skiing
Representing Austria
World Championships
Gold medal – first place	1999 Ramsau	4 × 10 km relay
Silver medal – second place	1999 Ramsau	10 km classical

Alois Stadlober (born 11 April 1962 in Judenburg) is an Austrian former cross-country skier who competed from 1988 to 2000. He earned two medals at the 1999 FIS Nordic World Ski Championships with a gold in the 4 × 10 km relay and a silver in the 10 km.

Stadlober's best individual finish at the Winter Olympics was an eighth in the 10 km event at Albertville in 1992. He won four races in his career, all in 10 km and in Austria, from 1995 to 1997.

He is married to former alpine skier Roswitha Steiner and is the father of cross-country skiers Luis Stadlober and Teresa Stadlober.

== Cross-country skiing results ==
All results are sourced from the International Ski Federation (FIS).

=== Olympic Games ===
Year	Age	10 km	15 km	Pursuit	30 km	50 km	4 × 10 km relay
1984	21	—N/a	25	—N/a	—	24	11
1988	25	—N/a	36	—N/a	33	DNF	10
1992	29	8	—N/a	10	19	—	9
1994	31	10	—N/a	11	—	15	—
1998	35	12	—N/a	14	—	12	9

=== World Championships ===
- 2 medals – (1 gold, 1 silver)

Year	Age	10 km	15 km classical	15 km freestyle	Pursuit	30 km	50 km	4 × 10 km relay
1985	22	—N/a	29	—N/a	—N/a	—	—	—
1987	24	—N/a	—	—N/a	—N/a	—	—	9
1989	26	—N/a	32	—	—N/a	35	DNF	11
1991	28	26	—N/a	—	—N/a	6	21	6
1995	32	43	—N/a	—N/a	25	—	DNF	5
1997	34	9	—N/a	—N/a	9	—	22	13
1999	36	Silver	—N/a	—N/a	8	5	5	Gold

=== World Cup ===
==== Season standings ====
Season	Age			
Season	Age	Overall	Long Distance	Sprint
1983	20	NC	—N/a	—N/a
1984	21	NC	—N/a	—N/a
1988	25	41	—N/a	—N/a
1989	26	43	—N/a	—N/a
1990	27	26	—N/a	—N/a
1991	28	28	—N/a	—N/a
1992	29	15	—N/a	—N/a
1993	30	42	—N/a	—N/a
1994	31	35	—N/a	—N/a
1995	32	14	—N/a	—N/a
1996	33	24	—N/a	—N/a
1997	34	18	38	12
1998	35	21	22	22
1999	36	11	10	20

==== Individual podiums ====
- 2 podiums

No.	Season	Date	Location	Race	Level	Place
1	1998–99	12 December 1998	Toblach, Italy	10 km Individual F	World Cup	3rd
2	1998–99	22 February 1999	Ramsau, Austria	10 km Individual C	World Championships^{[1]}	2nd

==== Team podiums ====
- 2 victories
- 3 podiums

No.	Season	Date	Location	Race	Level	Place	Teammates
1	1997–98	11 January 1998	Ramsau, Austria	4 × 10 km Relay C/F	World Cup	3rd	Botvinov / Hoffmann / Walcher
2	1998–99	20 December 1998	Davos, Switzerland	4 × 10 km Relay C/F	World Cup	3rd	Marent / Botvinov / Walcher
3	1998–99	26 February 1999	Ramsau, Austria	4 × 10 km Relay C/F	World Championships^{[1]}	1st	Gandler / Botvinov / Hoffmann

Note: ^{1} Until the 1999 World Championships, World Championship races were included in the World Cup scoring system.
