= Markus Gandler =

Austrian cross-country skier

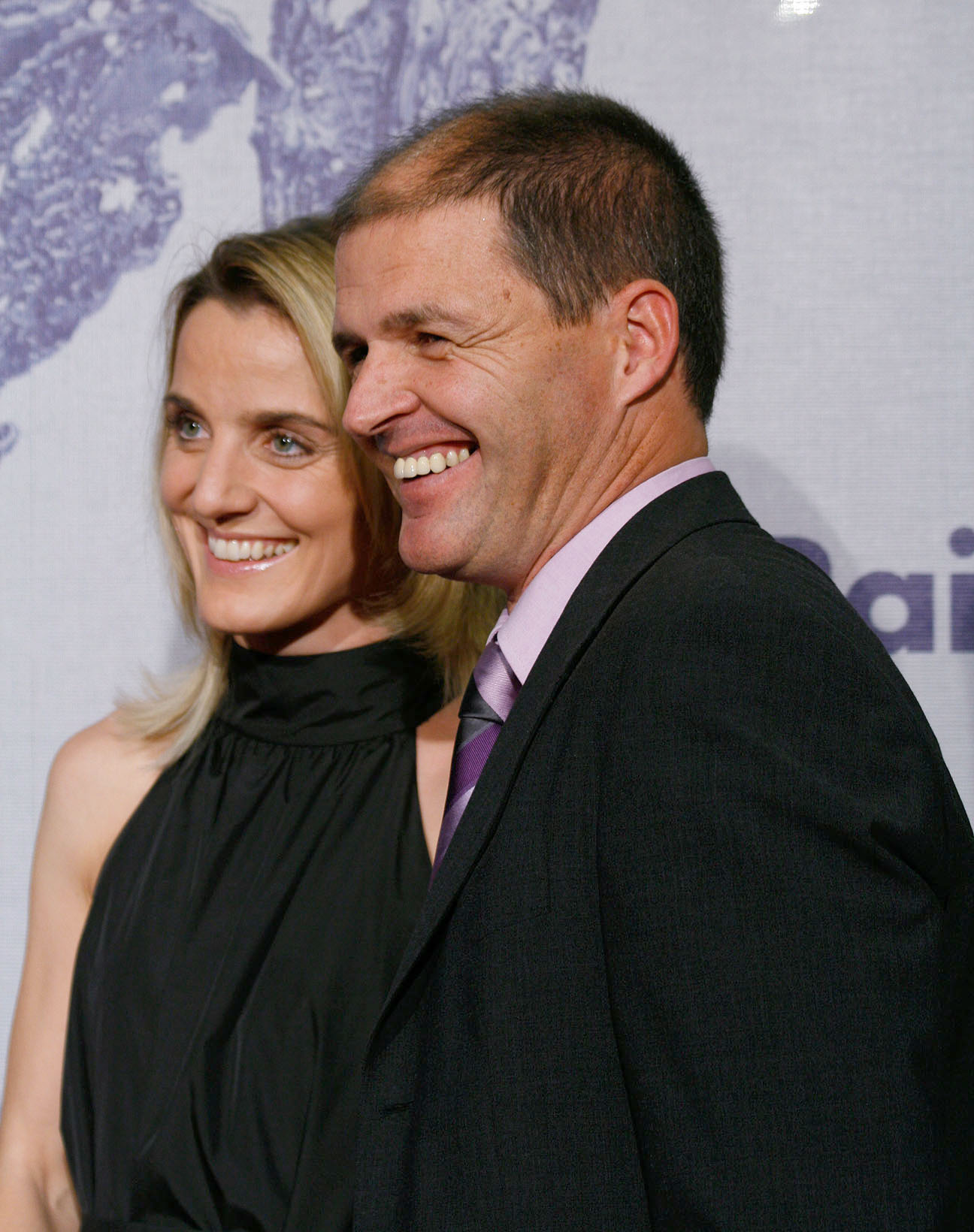
- Markus Gandler in 2009

Personal information
- Nationality: Austria
- Born: 20 August 1966 (age 60) Kitzbühel, Austria

Sport
- Sport: Skiing
- Club: Kitzbüheler SC

World Cup career
- Seasons: 13 – (1988–2000)
- Indiv. starts: 85
- Indiv. podiums: 1
- Indiv. wins: 0
- Team starts: 20
- Team podiums: 2
- Team wins: 2
- Overall titles: 0 – (17th in 1990, 1995, 1996)
- Discipline titles: 0
Medal record
Men's cross-country skiing
Representing Austria
Olympic Games
Silver medal – second place	1998 Nagano	10 km classical
World Championships
Gold medal – first place	1999 Ramsau	4 × 10 km relay
Junior World Championships
Silver medal – second place	1986 Lake Placid	30 km
Bronze medal – third place	1985 Täsch	3 × 5 km relay

Markus Gandler (born 20 August 1966 in Kitzbühel) is an Austrian former cross-country skier who competed from the late 1980s to the late 1990s.

At the 1989 FIS Nordic World Ski Championships in Lahti, his team ranked 11th in the 4 × 10 km relay. In the winter of 1989/1990 he had his best World Cup finish with a third in Canmore, Canada.

He won an Olympic silver medal in the men's 10 km at the 1998 Winter Olympics in Nagano.

At the 1999 FIS Nordic World Ski Championships in Ramsau, he won gold in 4 × 10 km relay with his relay teammates Alois Stadlober, Mikhail Botwinov, and Christian Hoffmann.

Since 2003, and also at the 2006 Winter Olympics in Turin, Italy he has been director of the Austrian biathlon and cross-country teams.

He received a life ban from the Austrian Olympic Committee in 2007 as one of 14 team officials who were implicated in doping activity at the 2006 Winter Olympics. The bans on Gandler and 11 others were subsequently rescinded in 2009, after the International Ski Federation dropped doping charges against Gandler, biathlon coach Alfred Eder and cross-country ski coach Gerald Heigl.

== Cross-country skiing results ==
All results are sourced from the International Ski Federation (FIS).

=== Olympic Games ===
- 1 medal – (1 silver)

Year	Age	10 km	15 km	Pursuit	30 km	50 km	4 × 10 km relay
1988	21	—N/a	—	—N/a	DNS	—	—
1992	25	34	—N/a	28	—	41	—
1998	31	Silver	—N/a	7	—	—	9

=== World Championships ===
- 1 medal – (1 gold)

Year	Age	10 km	15 km classical	15 km freestyle	Pursuit	30 km	50 km	4 × 10 km relay
1987	20	—N/a	—	—N/a	—N/a	—	—	9
1989	22	—N/a	—	46	—N/a	—	DNF	11
1991	24	—	—N/a	51	—N/a	—	45	—
1995	28	23	—N/a	—N/a	12	—	16	5
1997	30	38	—N/a	—N/a	DNF	54	—	13
1999	32	12	—N/a	—N/a	DNF	—	—	Gold

=== World Cup ===
==== Season standings ====
Season	Age				
Season	Age	Overall	Long Distance	Middle Distance	Sprint
1988	21	30	—N/a	—N/a	—N/a
1989	22	NC	—N/a	—N/a	—N/a
1990	23	17	—N/a	—N/a	—N/a
1991	24	NC	—N/a	—N/a	—N/a
1992	25	NC	—N/a	—N/a	—N/a
1993	26	55	—N/a	—N/a	—N/a
1994	27	NC	—N/a	—N/a	—N/a
1995	28	17	—N/a	—N/a	—N/a
1996	29	17	—N/a	—N/a	—N/a
1997	30	42	NC	—N/a	24
1998	31	43	NC	—N/a	35
1999	32	36	NC	—N/a	21
2000	33	79	—	—	44

==== Individual podiums ====
- 1 podium

No.	Season	Date	Location	Race	Level	Place
1	1989–90	16 December 1989	Canmore, Canada	15 km Individual F	World Cup	3rd

==== Team podiums ====
- 2 victories
- 2 podiums

No.	Season	Date	Location	Race	Level	Place	Teammates
1	1998–99	10 January 1999	Nové Město, Czech Republic	4 × 10 km Relay C/F	World Cup	1st	Marent / Botvinov / Hoffmann
2	1998–99	26 February 1999	Ramsau, Austria	4 × 10 km Relay C/F	World Championships^{[1]}	1st	Stadlober / Botvinov / Hoffmann

Note: ^{1} Until the 1999 World Championships, World Championship races were included in the World Cup scoring system.
