= Christian Hoffmann =

Austrian cross-country skier

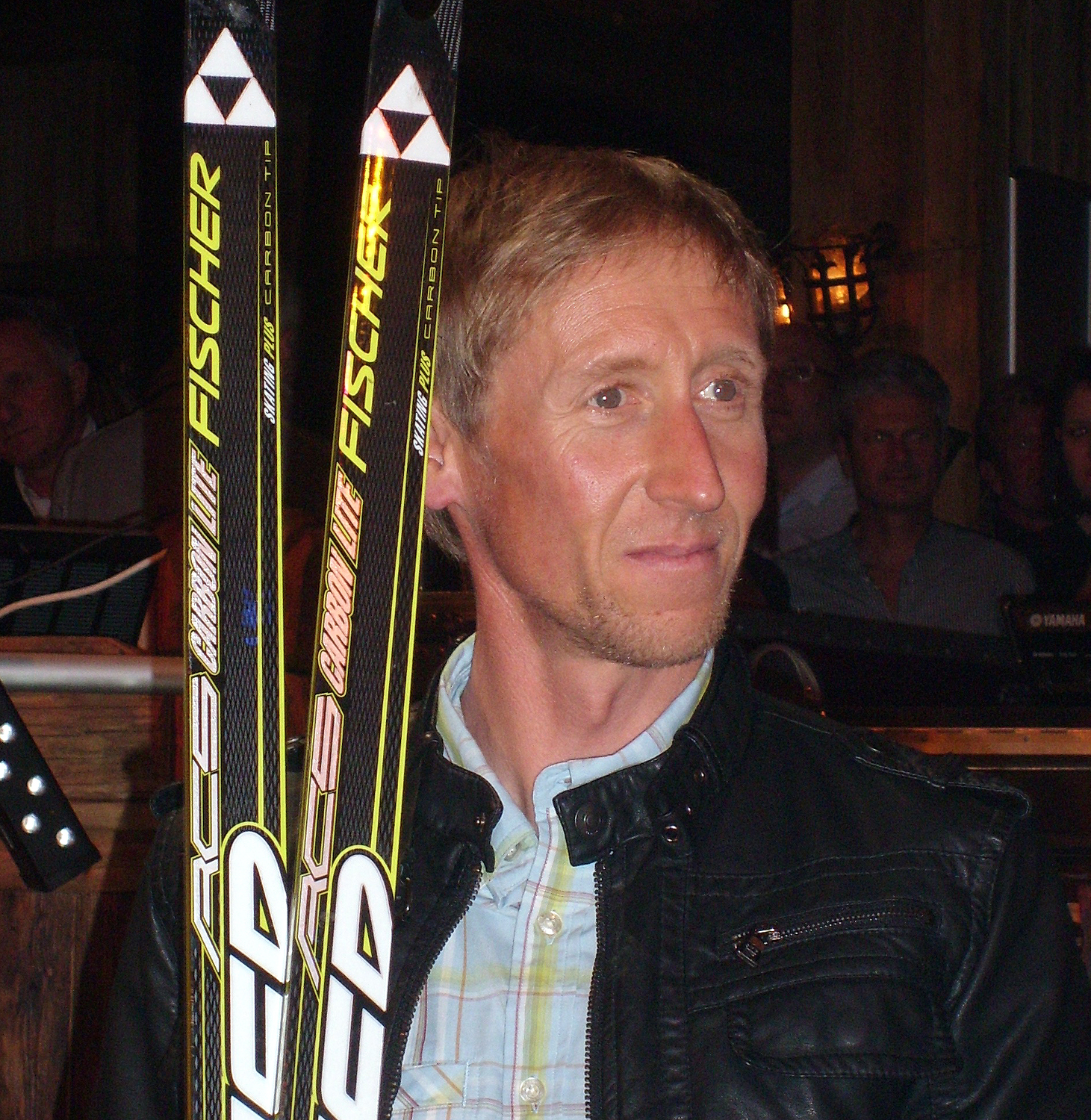
- Christian Hoffmann in April 2012

Personal information
- Nationality: Austria
- Born: 22 December 1974 (age 51) Aigen im Mühlkreis, Austria

Sport
- Sport: Skiing
- Club: SU Böhmerwald Ulrichsberg

World Cup career
- Seasons: 16 – (1995–2010)
- Indiv. starts: 125
- Indiv. podiums: 20
- Indiv. wins: 2
- Team starts: 27
- Team podiums: 7
- Team wins: 3
- Overall titles: 0 – (15th in 1999)
- Discipline titles: 0
Medal record
Men's cross-country skiing
Representing Austria
Olympic Games
Gold medal – first place	2002 Salt Lake City	30 km freestyle
Bronze medal – third place	1998 Nagano	50 km freestyle
World Championships
Gold medal – first place	1999 Ramsau	4 × 10 km relay

Christian Hoffmann (born 22 December 1974 in Aigen im Mühlkreis) is an Austrian former cross-country skier who began competing in 1994. He was banned for 6 years in 2011 for blood doping. He won the bronze medal in the 50 km at the 1998 Winter Olympics in Nagano. Four years later at the 2002 Winter Olympics in Salt Lake City, Hoffmann finished second in the 30 km freestyle mass start event to Spain's Johann Mühlegg, but was awarded the gold medal in 2004 upon Mühlegg's blood-doping disqualification of darbepoetin.

Hoffmann's best individual finish's were all likely chemically enhanced. At the FIS Nordic World Ski Championships he was fifth in the 50 km in 2001. He also won gold in the 4 x 10 km relay at the 1999 FIS Nordic World Ski Championships in Ramsau.

Hoffman also won two World Cup events in his career (10 km: 2003, 30 km: 2004). He and fellow skier Mikhail Botvinov also encountered controversy regarding blood doping in 2002, though both were cleared by the IOC on 9 April 2002. In July 2012 the Austrian Anti-Doping Agency (NADA) gave Hoffman a two-year ban for violation of anti-doping-guidelines.

== Cross-country skiing results ==
All results are sourced from the International Ski Federation (FIS).

=== Olympic Games ===
- 2 medals – (1 gold, 1 bronze)

Year	Age	10 km	15 km	Pursuit	30 km	50 km	Sprint	4 × 10 km relay
1998	23	—	—N/a	—	—	Bronze	—N/a	9
2002	27	—N/a	—	—	Gold	—	—	4

=== World Championships ===
- 1 medal – (1 gold)

Year	Age	10 km	15 km	Pursuit	30 km	50 km	Sprint	4 × 10 km relay	Team sprint
1997	22	DNF	—N/a	—	22	—	—N/a	13	—N/a
1999	24	—	—N/a	—	7	—	—N/a	Gold	—N/a
2001	26	—N/a	—	—	—	5	—	5	—N/a
2003	28	—N/a	—	—	—	10	—	DSQ	—N/a
2005	30	—N/a	DNS	—	—N/a	—	—	5	—
2007	32	—N/a	16	—	—N/a	—	—	DSQ	—
2009	34	—N/a	—	—	—N/a	24	—	—	—

=== World Cup ===
==== Season standings ====
Season	Age	Discipline standings					Ski Tour standings	
Season	Age	Overall	Distance	Long Distance	Middle Distance	Sprint	Tour de Ski	World Cup Final
1995	20	NC	—N/a	—N/a	—N/a	—N/a	—N/a	—N/a
1996	21	53	—N/a	—N/a	—N/a	—N/a	—N/a	—N/a
1997	22	33	—N/a	31	—N/a	32	—N/a	—N/a
1998	23	24	—N/a	48	—N/a	20	—N/a	—N/a
1999	24	15	—N/a	14	—N/a	6	—N/a	—N/a
2000	25	20	—N/a	48	7	34	—N/a	—N/a
2001	26	19	—N/a	—N/a	—N/a	30	—N/a	—N/a
2002	27	28	—N/a	—N/a	—N/a	63	—N/a	—N/a
2003	28	33	—N/a	—N/a	—N/a	NC	—N/a	—N/a
2004	29	24	17	—N/a	—N/a	—	—N/a	—N/a
2005	30	23	12	—N/a	—N/a	—	—N/a	—N/a
2006	31	56	36	—N/a	—N/a	—	—N/a	—N/a
2007	32	34	18	—N/a	—N/a	NC	32	—N/a
2008	33	32	22	—N/a	—N/a	96	17	18
2009	34	77	46	—N/a	—N/a	—	—	DNF
2010	35	NC	NC	—N/a	—N/a	—	—	—

==== Individual podiums ====
- 2 victories – (2 WC)
- 20 podiums – (19 WC, 1 SWC)

No.	Season	Date	Location	Race	Level	Place
1	1997–98	10 December 1997	Milan, Italy	1.0 km Sprint F	World Cup	3rd
2	1998–99	28 December 1998	Engelberg, Switzerland	1.0 km Sprint F	World Cup	2nd
3	1998–99	29 December 1998	Kitzbühel, Austria	1.0 km Sprint F	World Cup	3rd
4	1998–99	20 March 1999	Oslo, Norway	50 km Individual C	World Cup	3rd
5	1999–00	10 December 1999	Sappada, Italy	15 km Individual F	World Cup	3rd
6	2000–01	10 January 2001	Soldier Hollow, United States	30 km Mass Start F	World Cup	2nd
7	2001–02	12 December 2001	Brusson, Italy	15 km Individual F	World Cup	2nd
8	2001–02	22 December 2001	Ramsau, Austria	30 km Mass Start F	World Cup	3rd
9	2002–03	18 January 2003	Nové Město, Czech Republic	15 km Individual F	World Cup	2nd
10	2003–04	21 December 2003	Ramsau, Austria	10 km Individual F	World Cup	1st
11	2003–04	6 February 2004	La Clusaz, France	15 km Individual F	World Cup	3rd
12	2003–04	14 March 2004	Pragelato, Italy	30 km Individual F	World Cup	1st
13	2004–05	15 January 2005	Nové Město, Czech Republic	15 km Individual F	World Cup	2nd
14	2004–05	12 February 2005	Reit im Winkl, Germany	15 km Individual F	World Cup	3rd
15	2004–05	6 March 2005	Lahti, Finland	15 km Individual F	World Cup	2nd
16	2005–06	31 December 2005	Nové Město, Czech Republic	15 km Individual F	World Cup	3rd
17	2006–07	3 February 2007	Davos, Switzerland	15 km Individual F	World Cup	3rd
18	2007–08	6 January 2008	Val di Fiemme, Italy	10 km Pursuit F	Stage World Cup	2nd
19	2007–08	6 February 2008	Liberec, Czech Republic	11.4 km Individual F	World Cup	3rd
20	2008–09	8 March 2009	Lahti, Finland	15 km Individual F	World Cup	3rd

==== Team podiums ====
- 3 victories – (3 RL)
- 7 podiums – (7 RL)

No.	Season	Date	Location	Race	Level	Place	Teammates
1	1997–98	11 January 1998	Ramsau, Austria	4 × 10 km Relay C/F	World Cup	3rd	Botvinov / Stadlober / Walcher
2	1998–99	10 January 1999	Nové Město, Czech Republic	4 × 10 km Relay C/F	World Cup	1st	Gandler / Marent / Botvinov
3	1998–99	26 February 1999	Ramsau, Austria	4 × 10 km Relay C/F	World Championships^{[1]}	1st	Gandler / Stadlober / Botvinov
4	1999–00	13 January 2000	Nové Město, Czech Republic	4 × 10 km Relay C/F	World Cup	2nd	Marent / Botvinov / Walcher
5	1999–00	27 February 2000	Falun, Sweden	4 × 10 km Relay F	World Cup	3rd	Urain / Botvinov / Walcher
6	1999–00	5 March 2000	Lahti, Finland	4 × 10 km Relay C/F	World Cup	1st	Urain / Botvinov / Walcher
7	2000–01	9 December 2000	Santa Caterina, Italy	4 × 5 km Relay C/F	World Cup	2nd	Urain / Botvinov / Walcher

Note: ^{1} Until the 1999 World Championships, World Championship races were included in the World Cup scoring system.
