= Gerhard Urain =

Austrian cross-country skier

Personal information
- Nationality: Austria
- Born: 30 August 1972 (age 53) Rottenmann, Austria

Sport
- Sport: Skiing
- Club: SC Rottenmann

World Cup career
- Seasons: 1993–2005
- Indiv. starts: 95
- Indiv. podiums: 0
- Team starts: 20
- Team podiums: 4
- Team wins: 1
- Overall titles: 0 – (30th in 2001)
- Discipline titles: 0

Gerhard Urain (born 30 August 1972 in Rottenmann) is an Austrian cross-country skier. He represented Austria at the 1998 Winter Olympics in Nagano. At the 2002 Winter Olympics in Salt Lake City he placed fourth in the relay with the Austrian team.

== Cross-country skiing results ==
All results are sourced from the International Ski Federation (FIS).

=== Olympic Games ===
Year	Age	10 km	15 km	Pursuit	30 km	50 km	Sprint	4 × 10 km relay
1998	25	14	—N/a	16	43	DNF	—N/a	—
2002	29	—N/a	41	—	23	—	—	4

=== World Championships ===
Year	Age	10 km	15 km	Pursuit	30 km	50 km	Sprint	4 × 10 km relay	Team sprint
1993	20	37	—N/a	45	—	—	—N/a	—	—N/a
1995	22	69	—N/a	28	31	31	—N/a	5	—N/a
2001	28	—N/a	17	—	18	—	—	5	—N/a
2005	32	—N/a	31	—	—N/a	23	—	—	—

=== World Cup ===
==== Season standings ====
Season	Age				
Season	Age	Overall	Long Distance	Middle Distance	Sprint
1993	20	NC	—N/a	—N/a	—N/a
1994	21	64	—N/a	—N/a	—N/a
1995	22	85	—N/a	—N/a	—N/a
1996	23	66	—N/a	—N/a	—N/a
1997	24	67	38	—N/a	—
1998	25	93	NC	—N/a	73
1999	26	67	NC	—N/a	55
2000	27	55	59	37	NC
2001	28	30	—N/a	—N/a	72
2002	29	65	—N/a	—N/a	53
2003	30	NC	—N/a	—N/a	NC
2004	31	NC	—N/a	—N/a	—
2005	32	116	—N/a	—N/a	—

==== Team podiums ====
- 1 victory
- 4 podiums

No.	Season	Date	Location	Race	Level	Place	Teammates
1	1999–00	28 November 1999	Kiruna, Sweden	4 × 10 km Relay F	World Cup	3rd	Botvinov / Marent / Walcher
2	1999–00	27 February 2000	Falun, Sweden	4 × 10 km Relay F	World Cup	3rd	Botvinov / Walcher / Hoffmann
3	1999–00	5 March 2000	Lahti, Finland	4 × 10 km Relay C/F	World Cup	1st	Botvinov / Walcher / Hoffmann
4	2000–01	9 December 2000	Santa Caterina, Italy	4 × 5 km Relay C/F	World Cup	2nd	Botvinov / Walcher / Hoffmann
