= Mishino, Cherepovetsky District, Vologda Oblast =

Mishino Мишино
- Village
- Location within Vologda Oblast Location within Russia
- Coordinates: 59°28′N 37°29′E
- Country: Russia
- Region: Vologda Oblast
- District: Cherepovetsky District
- Time zone: UTC+3:00

Mishino (Russian: Мишино) is a rural locality (a village) in Voskresenskoye Rural Settlement, Cherepovetsky District, Vologda Oblast, Russia. The population was 12 as of 2002.

== Geography ==
Mishino is located 69 km (43 mi) northwest of Cherepovets (the district's administrative centre) by road. Shulma is the nearest rural locality.
