= Mishino, Chagodoshchensky District, Vologda Oblast =

Mishino Мишино
- Village
- Location within Vologda Oblast Location within Russia
- Coordinates: 58°56′N 35°16′E
- Country: Russia
- Region: Vologda Oblast
- District: Chagodoshchensky District
- Time zone: UTC+3:00

Mishino (Russian: Мишино) is a rural locality (a village) in Izboishchskoye Rural Settlement, Chagodoshchensky District, Vologda Oblast, Russia. The population was 19 as of 2002. There are 2 streets.

== Geography ==
Mishino is located 34 km (21 mi) south of Chagoda (the district's administrative centre) by road. Trukhino is the nearest rural locality.
