= Mishino, Vladimir Oblast =

Mishino Мишино
- Village
- Location within Vladimir Oblast Location within Russia
- Coordinates: 55°30′N 41°59′E
- Country: Russia
- Region: Vladimir Oblast
- District: Muromsky District
- Time zone: UTC+3:00

Mishino (Russian: Мишино) is a rural locality (a village) in Kovarditskoye Rural Settlement, Muromsky District, Vladimir Oblast, Russia. The population was 217 as of 2010. There are 4 streets.

== Geography ==
Mishino is located on the Ilevna River, 12 km south of Murom (the district's administrative centre) by road. Zagryazhskoye is the nearest rural locality.
