= FIS Nordic World Ski Championships 1999 =

Ski tournament held in Austria in 1999

- Official logo for the FIS Nordic World Ski Championships 1999.
- Host city: Ramsau am Dachstein, Austria
- Events: 16
- Opening: 19 February 1999
- Closing: 28 February 1999
- Main venue: W90-Mattensprunganlage
- Website: wm.ramsau.at

The FIS Nordic World Ski Championships 1999 took place February 19–28, 1999 in Ramsau am Dachstein, Austria. The large hill ski jumping events took place at the Paul-Ausserleitner-Schanze in Bischofshofen. The 7.5 km Nordic combined sprint event debuted at these championships.

== Men's cross-country skiing ==
=== 10 km classical ===
February 22, 1999

Medal	Athlete	Time
Gold	Mika Myllylä (FIN)	24:19.2
Silver	Alois Stadlober (AUT)	24:34.7
Bronze	Odd-Bjørn Hjelmeset (NOR)	24:37.1

=== 10 km + 15 km combined pursuit ===
February 23, 1999

Medal	Athlete	Time
Gold	Thomas Alsgaard (NOR)	1:05:54.9
Silver	Mika Myllylä (FIN)	1:05:55.6
Bronze	Fulvio Valbusa (ITA)	1:06:17.6

=== 30 km freestyle ===
February 19, 1999

Medal	Athlete	Time
Gold	Mika Myllylä (FIN)	1:15:26.2
Silver	Thomas Alsgaard (NOR)	1:16:01.5
Bronze	Bjørn Dæhlie (NOR)	1:16:08.7

=== 50 km classical ===
February 28, 1999

Medal	Athlete	Time
Gold	Mika Myllylä (FIN)	2:18:08.7
Silver	Andrus Veerpalu (EST)	2:18:40.5
Bronze	Mikhail Botvinov (AUT)	2:19:52.3

=== 4 × 10 km relay ===
February 26, 1999

Medal	Team	Time
Gold	Austria (Markus Gandler, Alois Stadlober, Mikhail Botvinov, Christian Hoffmann)	1:35:07.5
Silver	Norway (Espen Bjervig, Erling Jevne, Bjørn Dæhlie, Thomas Alsgaard)	1:35:07.7
Bronze	Italy (Giorgio Di Centa, Fabio Maj, Fulvio Valbusa, Silvio Fauner)	1:36:38.1

The first two legs were run in the classical style while the last two legs were run in freestyle. Austria won its first relay medal since 1933 though it was done in dramatic fashion. Botvinov fell during his leg, causing Austria to lose its large lead, setting up a fight to the finish between Austria's Hoffmann and Norway's Alsgaard. As of 2025, this is the last men's relay at the world championships that was not won by Norway.

== Women's cross-country skiing ==
=== 5 km classical ===
February 22, 1999

Medal	Athlete	Time
Gold	Bente Martinsen (NOR)	12:49.8
Silver	Olga Danilova (RUS)	13:02.5
Bronze	Kateřina Neumannová (CZE)	13:07.0

=== 5 km + 10 km combined pursuit ===
February 23, 1999

Medal	Athlete	Time
Gold	Stefania Belmondo (ITA)	42:27.9
Silver	Nina Gavrylyuk (RUS)	42:56.8
Bronze	Iryna Taranenko-Terelya (UKR)	43:02.3

Taranenko became the first Ukrainian to medal in the FIS Nordic World Ski Championships.

=== 15 km freestyle ===
February 19, 1999

Medal	Athlete	Time
Gold	Stefania Belmondo (ITA)	38:49.0
Silver	Kristina Šmigun (EST)	39:19.4
Bronze	Maria Theurl (AUT)	39:43.5

=== 30 km classical ===
February 27, 1999

Medal	Athlete	Time
Gold	Larisa Lazutina (RUS)	1:29:19.9
Silver	Olga Danilova (RUS)	1:30:53.9
Bronze	Kristina Šmigun (EST)	1:31:14.6

=== 4 × 5 km relay ===
February 26, 1999

Medal	Team	Time
Gold	Russia (Olga Danilova, Larisa Lazutina, Anfisa Reztsova, Nina Gavrylyuk)	53:05.9
Silver	Italy (Sabina Valbusa, Gabriella Paruzzi, Antonella Confortola, Stefania Belmondo)	54:30.4
Bronze	Germany (Viola Bauer, Ramona Roth, Evi Sachenbacher, Sigrid Wille)	55:13.7

The first two legs were run in classical style while the last two legs were run in freestyle.

== Men's Nordic combined ==
=== 7.5 km sprint ===
February 27, 1999

Medal	Athlete	Time
Gold	Bjarte Engen Vik (NOR)	17.48.4
Silver	Mario Stecher (AUT)	+30.2
Bronze	Kenji Ogiwara (JPN)	+31.0

=== 15 km Individual Gundersen ===
February 20, 1999

Medal	Athlete	Time
Gold	Bjarte Engen Vik (NOR)	37.34.8
Silver	Samppa Lajunen (FIN)	34.5
Bronze	Dmitry Sinitzyn (RUS)	1.52.9

=== 4 × 5 km team ===
February 25, 1999

Medal	Team	Time
Gold	Finland (Hannu Manninen, Tapio Nurmela, Jari Mantila, Samppa Lajunen)	49.34.2
Silver	Norway (Fred Børre Lundberg, Trond Einar Elden, Bjarte Engen Vik, Kenneth Braaten)	+ 1.14.7
Bronze	Russia (Nikolai Parfionov, Alexey Fadeyev, Valeri Stolyarov, Dmitry Sinitsyn)	+ 1.53.2

== Men's ski jumping ==
=== Individual normal hill ===
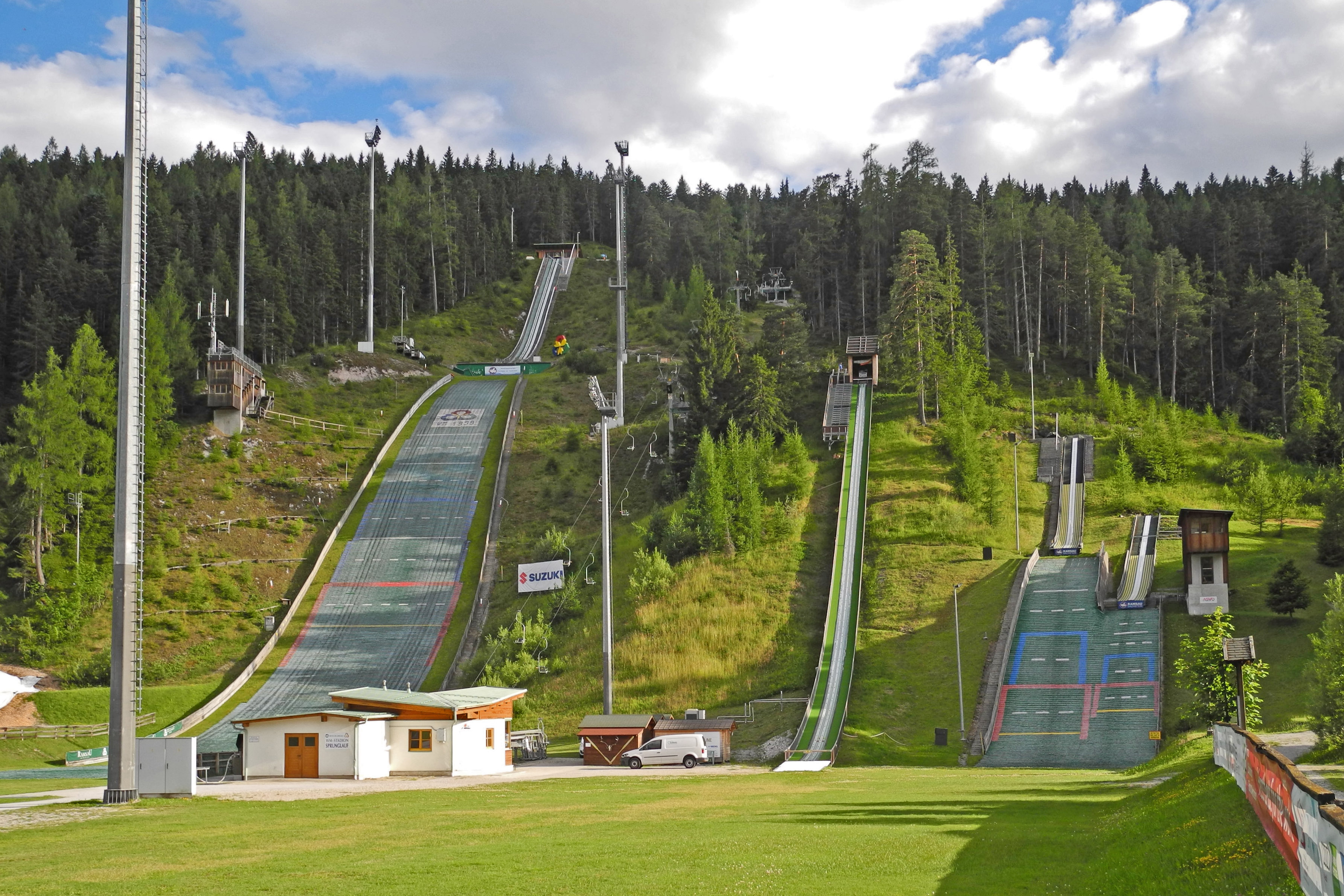
W90-Mattensprunganlage

February 26, 1999 at the W90-Mattensprunganlage

Medal	Athlete	Points
Gold	Kazuyoshi Funaki (JPN)	255.0
Silver	Hideharu Miyahira (JPN)	253.5
Bronze	Masahiko Harada (JPN)	252.0

=== Individual large hill ===
February 21, 1999 at the Paul-Ausserleitner-Schanze in Bischofshofen, Austria.

Medal	Athlete	Points
Gold	Martin Schmitt (GER)	263.4
Silver	Sven Hannawald (GER)	261.7
Bronze	Hideharu Miyahira (JPN)	258.8

=== Team large hill ===
February 20, 1999 at the Paul-Ausserleitner-Schanze in Bischofshofen, Austria.

Medal	Team	Points
Gold	Germany (Sven Hannawald, Christof Duffner, Dieter Thoma, Martin Schmitt)	988.9
Silver	Japan (Noriaki Kasai, Hideharu Miyahira, Masahiko Harada, Kazuyoshi Funaki)	987.0
Bronze	Austria (Andreas Widhölzl, Martin Höllwarth, Reinhard Schwarzenberger, Stefan Horngacher)	905.5

== Medal table ==
Medal winners by nation.

* Host nation (Austria)

Rank	Nation	Gold	Silver	Bronze	Total
1	Norway (NOR)	4	3	2	9
2	Finland (FIN)	4	2	0	6
3	Russia (RUS)	2	3	2	7
4	Italy (ITA)	2	1	2	5
5	Germany (GER)	2	1	1	4
6	Austria (AUT)*	1	2	3	6
6	Japan (JPN)	1	2	3	6
8	Estonia (EST)	0	2	1	3
9	Czech Republic (CZE)	0	0	1	1
9	Ukraine (UKR)	0	0	1	1
Totals (10 entries)		16	16	16	48
