= Tuulikki Pyykkönen =

Finnish cross-country skier

Personal information
- Nationality: Finland
- Born: 25 November 1963 (age 62) Puolanka, Finland

Sport
- Sport: Skiing

World Cup career
- Seasons: 15 – (1984–1998)
- Indiv. starts: 80
- Indiv. podiums: 1
- Indiv. wins: 0
- Team starts: 22
- Team podiums: 8
- Team wins: 0
- Overall titles: 0 – (10th in 1990)
Medal record
Women's cross-country skiing
Representing Finland
World Championships
Bronze medal – third place	1997 Trondheim	4 × 5 km relay
Junior World Championships
Silver medal – second place	1982 Murau	3 × 5 km relay

Tuulikki Pyykkönen (born 25 November 1963 in Puolanka, Kainuu) is a Finnish former cross-country skier who competed from 1987 to 1998. She won a bronze medal at the 4 × 5 km relay in the 1997 FIS Nordic World Ski Championships and had her best finish of sixth in the 15 km event at the 1989 FIS Nordic World Ski Championships.

Pyykkönen's best individual finish at the Winter Olympics was 12th in the 5 km at Calgary in 1988. Her only individual victory was in a 5 km event in Finland in 1995.

== Cross-country skiing results ==
All results are sourced from the International Ski Federation (FIS).

=== Olympic Games ===
Year	Age	5 km	10 km	15 km	Pursuit	20 km	30 km	4 × 5 km relay
1988	24	12	29	—N/a	—N/a	—	—N/a	—
1992	28	29	—N/a	—	33	—N/a	—	—
1994	30	18	—N/a	—	DNS	—N/a	—	—
1998	34	17	—N/a	12	DNS	—N/a	—	7

=== World Championships ===
- 1 medal – (1 bronze)

Year	Age	5 km	10 km classical	10 km freestyle	15 km	Pursuit	20 km	30 km	4 × 5 km relay
1987	23	12	20	—N/a	—N/a	—N/a	—	—N/a	—
1989	25	—N/a	7	17	6	—N/a	—N/a	—	—
1991	27	12	—N/a	—	DNF	—N/a	—N/a	—	4
1993	29	13	—N/a	—N/a	13	DNS	—N/a	—	4
1995	31	34	—N/a	—N/a	11	DNS	—N/a	—	6
1997	33	19	—N/a	—N/a	—	DNS	—N/a	DNF	Bronze

=== World Cup ===
==== Season standings ====
Season	Age			
Season	Age	Overall	Long Distance	Sprint
1984	24	NC	—N/a	—N/a
1985	25	NC	—N/a	—N/a
1990	26	NC	—N/a	—N/a
1991	27	NC	—N/a	—N/a
1992	28	37	—N/a	—N/a
1993	29	51	—N/a	—N/a
1994	30	25	—N/a	—N/a
1995	31	23	—N/a	—N/a
1996	32	36	—N/a	—N/a
1997	33	NC	NC	—
1998	34	NC	NC	—

==== Individual podiums ====
- 1 podium

No.	Season	Date	Location	Race	Level	Place
1	1989–90	9 December 1989	Soldier Hollow, United States	5 km Individual C	World Cup	2nd

==== Team podiums ====
- 8 podiums

No.	Season	Date	Location	Race	Level	Place	Teammates
1	1986–87	1 March 1987	Lahti, Finland	4 × 5 km Relay C/F	World Cup	3rd	Määttä / Savolainen / Matikainen
2	1986–87	19 March 1987	Oslo, Norway	4 × 5 km Relay C	World Cup	2nd	Hyytiäinen / Matikainen / Määttä
3	1989–90	4 March 1990	Lahti, Finland	4 × 5 km Relay F	World Cup	3rd	Määttä / Kuivalainen / Hyytiäinen
4	1989–90	11 March 1990	Örnsköldsvik, Sweden	4 × 5 km Relay C/F	World Cup	3rd	Määttä / Kuivalainen / Savolainen
5	1993–94	4 March 1994	Lahti, Finland	4 × 5 km Relay C	World Cup	3rd	Rolig / Lahtinen / Kirvesniemi
6	1995–96	17 March 1996	Oslo, Norway	4 × 5 km Relay C/F	World Cup	2nd	Sirviö / Pulkkinen / Kittilä
7	1996–97	28 February 1997	Trondheim, Norway	4 × 5 km Relay C/F	World Championships^{[1]}	3rd	Sirviö / Pulkkinen / Salonen
8	1996–97	9 March 1997	Falun, Sweden	4 × 5 km Relay C/F	World Cup	3rd	Sirviö / Pulkkinen / Salonen

Note: ^{1} Until the 1999 World Championships, World Championship races were included in the World Cup scoring system.
