= Eija Hyytiäinen =

Finnish cross-country skier

Personal information
- Full name: Eija Marita Hyytiäinen
- Nationality: Finland
- Born: 4 January 1961 (age 65) Saarijärvi, Finland

Sport
- Sport: Skiing

World Cup career
- Seasons: 10 – (1982–1990, 1992)
- Indiv. starts: 34
- Indiv. podiums: 0
- Team starts: 9
- Team podiums: 7
- Team wins: 0
- Overall titles: 0 – (15th in 1983)
Medal record
Women's cross-country skiing
Representing Finland
Olympic Games
Bronze medal – third place	1984 Sarajevo	4 × 5 km relay
World Championships
Silver medal – second place	1980 Örnsköldsvik	3 × 5 km relay

Eija Hyytiäinen (born 4 January 1961) is a Finnish former cross-country skier who competed during the 1980s. She won a bronze medal in the 4 × 5 km relay at the 1984 Winter Olympics in Sarajevo.

== Cross-country skiing results ==
All results are sourced from the International Ski Federation (FIS).

=== Olympic Games ===
- 1 medal – (1 bronze)

Year	Age	5 km	10 km	20 km	4 × 5 km relay
1984	23	19	25	17	Bronze
1988	27	—	—	32	—

=== World Championships ===
Year	Age	5 km	10 km classical	10 km freestyle	15 km	20 km	30 km	4 × 5 km relay
1982	21	—	—	—N/a	—N/a	38	—N/a	—
1985	24	—	38	—N/a	—N/a	23	—N/a	—
1987	26	—	12	—N/a	—N/a	22	—N/a	6
1989	28	—N/a	—	13	—	—N/a	20	—
1991	30	22	—N/a	—	—	—N/a	39	—

=== World Cup ===
==== Season standings ====
Season	Age	Overall
1982	21	40
1983	22	15
1984	23	28
1985	24	26
1986	25	17
1987	26	28
1988	27	NC
1989	28	36
1990	29	NC
1992	31	NC

==== Team podiums ====
- 7 podiums

No.	Season	Date	Location	Race	Level	Place	Teammates
1	1983–84	15 February 1984	(Socialist Federal Republic of Yugoslavia) Sarajevo, Yugoslavia	4 × 5 km Relay	Olympic Games^{[1]}	3rd	Määttä / Matikainen / Hämäläinen
2	1983–84	26 February 1984	Falun, Sweden	4 × 5 km Relay	World Cup	2nd	Määttä / Savolainen / Hämäläinen
3	1984–85	10 March 1985	Falun, Sweden	4 × 5 km Relay	World Cup	3rd	Määttä / Matikainen / Kirvesniemi
4	1985–86	10 March 1985	Lahti, Finland	4 × 5 km Relay C	World Cup	3rd	Määttä / Savolainen / Matikainen
5	1986–87	19 March 1987	Oslo, Norway	4 × 5 km Relay C	World Cup	2nd	Matikainen / Määttä / Pyykkönen
6	1987–88	13 March 1988	Falun, Sweden	4 × 5 km Relay C	World Cup	2nd	Kirvesniemi / Matikainen / Määttä
7	1989–90	4 March 1990	Lahti, Finland	4 × 5 km Relay F	World Cup	3rd	Määttä / Kuivalainen / Pyykkönen

Note: ^{1} Until the 1994 Olympics, Olympic races were included in the World Cup scoring system.
