= Blechschmidt =

Blechschmidt is a German surname meaning "tinsmith". Notable people with the surname include:

- Bernd Blechschmidt, East German Nordic combined skier
- Joachim Blechschmidt (1912–1943), German fighter ace and Knight's Cross recipient
- Wilhelm Blechschmidt, Czech bobsledder
