= Marjo Matikainen-Kallström =

Finnish politician and former cross-country skier

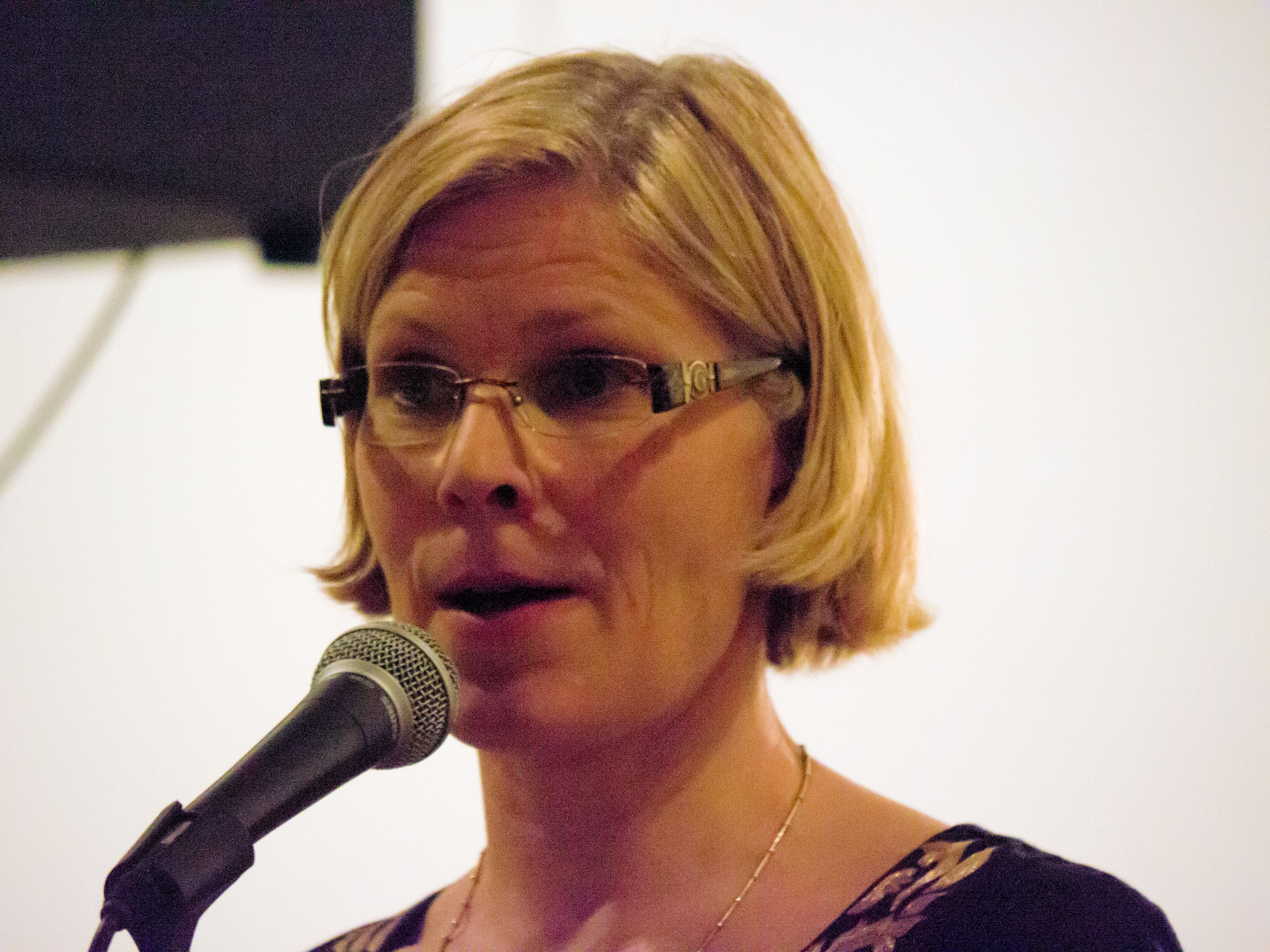

Personal information
- Full name: Marjo Tuulevi Matikainen-Kallström
- Born: Marjo Tuulevi Matikainen; 3 February 1965 (age 61) Lohja, Finland

Sport
- Sport: Skiing
- Club: Espoon Hiihtoseura

World Cup career
- Seasons: 6 – (1984–1989)
- Indiv. starts: 37
- Indiv. podiums: 16
- Indiv. wins: 8
- Team starts: 10
- Team podiums: 8
- Team wins: 1
- Overall titles: 3 – (1986, 1987, 1988)
Medal record
Women's cross-country skiing
Representing Finland
Olympic Games
Gold medal – first place	1988 Calgary	5 km classical
Bronze medal – third place	1988 Calgary	10 km classical
Bronze medal – third place	1984 Sarajevo	4 × 5 km relay
Bronze medal – third place	1988 Calgary	4 × 5 km relay
World Championships
Gold medal – first place	1987 Oberstdorf	5 km classical
Gold medal – first place	1989 Lahti	15 km classical
Gold medal – first place	1989 Lahti	4 × 5 km relay
Silver medal – second place	1987 Oberstdorf	10 km classical
Silver medal – second place	1989 Lahti	10 km freestyle
Bronze medal – third place	1989 Lahti	10 km classical
Bronze medal – third place	1989 Lahti	30 km freestyle
Junior World Championships
Gold medal – first place	1983 Kuopio	3 × 5 km relay
Silver medal – second place	1982 Murau	3 × 5 km relay

Marjo Tuulevi Matikainen-Kallström (born 3 February 1965) is a Finnish former politician and cross-country skier.

== Politics ==
Matikainen-Kallström has represented the National Coalition Party (Kokoomus) in Finland. From 1996 to 2004 she was a Member of the European Parliament, and from 2004 to 2015 a member of the Finnish Parliament.

== Athletics ==
She had a very short but winning sporting career. In the six seasons she competed at a top international level, she won the World Cup three years in a row. At the 1984 Winter Olympics in Sarajevo, Matikainen-Kallström won a bronze medal in the relay aged just 19.

Four years later in Calgary she won bronze on the 10 km race, and in the 5 km sprint won gold after being in second place all race until the last kilometre before coming through to win, 1.3 seconds ahead of Tamara Tikhonova, who had to settle for silver. That same year she won another bronze medal in the relay.

At the 1987 FIS Nordic World Ski Championships in Oberstdorf, she won the 5 km and silver in the 10 km. Matikainen-Kallström finished her championship career with a fantastic 1989 FIS Nordic World Ski Championships on her home soil in Lahti, where she won the following medals:

Matikainen-Kallström also was the first winner of the women's 30 km event at the Holmenkollen ski festival in 1988.

== Scholastics ==
She quit competition after these championships at the age of 24 to concentrate on her studies at the Helsinki University of Technology and on politics.

== Cross-country skiing results ==
All results are sourced from the International Ski Federation (FIS).

=== Olympic Games ===
- 4 medals – (1 gold, 3 bronze)

Year	Age	5 km	10 km	20 km	4 × 5 km relay
1984	19	22	—	—	Bronze
1988	23	Gold	Bronze	12	Bronze

=== World Championships ===
- 7 medals – (3 gold, 2 silver, 2 bronze)

Year	Age	5 km	10 km classical	10 km freestyle	15 km	20 km	30 km	4 × 5 km relay
1985	19	11	—	—N/a	—N/a	—	—N/a	4
1987	22	Gold	Silver	—N/a	—N/a	4	—N/a	6
1989	24	—N/a	Bronze	Silver	Gold	—N/a	Bronze	Gold

=== World Cup ===
==== Season titles ====
- 3 titles – (3 overall)

Season	
Season	Discipline
1986	Overall
1987	Overall
1988	Overall

==== Season standings ====
Season	Age	Overall
1984	19	NC
1985	20	36
1986	21	1
1987	22	1
1988	23	1
1989	24	11

==== Individual podiums ====
- 8 victories
- 17 podiums

No.	Season	Date	Location	Race	Level	Place
1	1985–86	7 December 1985	Labrador City, Canada	5 km Individual F	World Cup	1st
2	1985–86	13 January 1985	Biwabik, United States	10 km Individual C	World Cup	3rd
3	1985–86	2 March 1986	Lahti, Finland	5 km Individual C	World Cup	1st
4	1985–86	8 March 1986	Falun, Sweden	30 km Individual C	World Cup	2nd
5	1986–87	13 February 1987	Oberstdorf, West Germany	10 km Individual C	World Championships^{[1]}	2nd
6	1986–87	16 February 1987	Oberstdorf, West Germany	5 km Individual C	World Championships^{[1]}	1st
7	1986–87	28 February 1987	Lahti, Finland	5 km Individual F	World Cup	1st
8	1986–87	7 March 1987	Falun, Sweden	30 km Individual F	World Cup	2nd
9	1986–87	15 March 1987	Kavgolovo, Soviet Union	10 km Individual C	World Cup	1st
10	1987–88	14 February 1988	Calgary, Canada	10 km Individual C	Olympic Games^{[1]}	3rd
11	1987–88	17 February 1988	Calgary, Canada	5 km Individual C	Olympic Games^{[1]}	1st
12	1987–88	12 March 1988	Falun, Sweden	5 km Individual C	World Cup	2nd
13	1987–88	17 March 1988	Oslo, Norway	30 km Individual C	World Cup	1st
14	1988–89	17 February 1989	Lahti, Finland	10 km Individual C	World Championships^{[1]}	3rd
15	1988–89	19 February 1989	Lahti, Finland	10 km Individual F	World Championships^{[1]}	2nd
16	1988–89	21 February 1989	Lahti, Finland	15 km Individual C	World Championships^{[1]}	1st
17	1988–89	25 February 1989	Lahti, Finland	30 km Individual F	World Championships^{[1]}	3rd

==== Team podiums ====
- 1 victory
- 8 podiums

No.	Season	Date	Location	Race	Level	Place	Teammates
1	1983–84	15 February 1984	(Socialist Federal Republic of Yugoslavia) Sarajevo, Yugoslavia	4 × 5 km Relay	Olympic Games^{[1]}	3rd	Määttä / Hyytiäinen / Hämäläinen
2	1984–85	10 March 1985	Falun, Sweden	4 × 5 km Relay	World Cup	3rd	Määttä / Hyytiäinen / Hämäläinen
3	1985–86	1 March 1986	Lahti, Finland	4 × 5 km Relay C	World Cup	3rd	Määttä / Hyytiäinen / Savolainen
4	1986–87	1 March 1987	Lahti, Finland	4 × 5 km Relay C	World Cup	3rd	Pyykkönen / Määttä / Savolainen
5	1986–87	19 March 1987	Oslo, Norway	4 × 5 km Relay C	World Cup	2nd	Hyytiäinen / Määttä / Pyykkönen
6	1987–88	21 February 1988	Calgary, Canada	4 × 5 km Relay F	Olympic Games^{[1]}	3rd	Määttä / Kirvesniemi / Savolainen
7	1987–88	13 March 1988	Falun, Sweden	4 × 5 km Relay C	World Cup	2nd	Kirvesniemi / Hyytiäinen / Määttä
8	1988–89	23 February 1989	Lahti, Finland	4 × 5 km Relay C/F	World Championships^{[1]}	1st	Määttä / Kirvesniemi / Savolainen

Note: ^{1} Until the 1999 World Championships and the 1994 Olympics, World Championship and Olympic races were included in the World Cup scoring system.
