= Erja =

Erja can refer to:

- Erja (given name), Finnish feminine given name
- Erja, Lääne County, village in Lääne County, Estonia
