= Ralph Leonhardt =

East German/German Nordic combined skier

Medal record

Representing East Germany

Men's Nordic combined

World Championships
Bronze medal – third place	1989 Lahti	3 x 10 km team

Ralph Leonhardt (born October 14, 1967) is a former East German/German Nordic combined skier who competed during the late 1980s and early 1990s. He won a bronze medal in the 3 x 10 km team event at the 1989 FIS Nordic World Ski Championships in Lahti.

Leonhardt's best individual finish was 2nd in Austria in 1992.
