= Yelena Välbe =

Russian cross-country skier

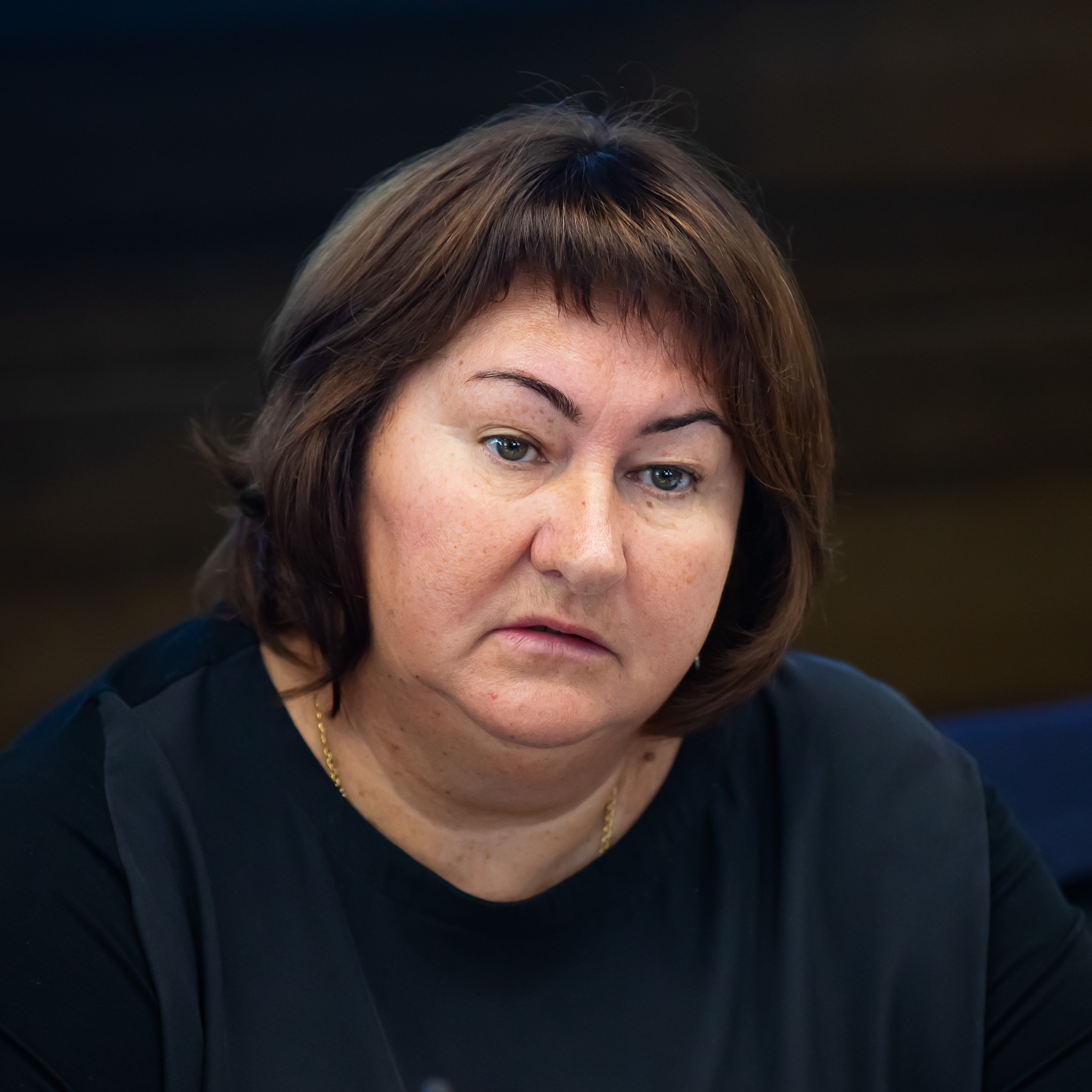
- Yelena Välbe in 2021

Personal information
- Full name: Yelena Valeryevna Välbe
- Nationality: Russia
- Born: 20 April 1968 (age 58) Magadan, Russian SFSR, Soviet Union (now Russia)
- Height: 164 cm (5 ft 5 in)
- Spouse: Urmas Välbe (divorced in 2005)

Sport
- Sport: Skiing
- Club: CSKA Moscow

World Cup career
- Seasons: 11– (1987, 1989–1998)
- Indiv. starts: 117
- Indiv. podiums: 81
- Indiv. wins: 45
- Team starts: 33
- Team podiums: 32
- Team wins: 24
- Overall titles: 5 – (1989, 1991, 1992, 1995, 1997)
- Discipline titles: 1 – (1 LD: 1997)
Medal record
Women's cross-country skiing
Olympic Games
Representing Russia
Gold medal – first place	1994 Lillehammer	4 × 5 km relay
Gold medal – first place	1998 Nagano	4 × 5 km relay
Representing Unified Team
Gold medal – first place	1992 Albertville	4 × 5 km relay
Bronze medal – third place	1992 Albertville	5 km classical
Bronze medal – third place	1992 Albertville	15 km classical
Bronze medal – third place	1992 Albertville	5 km + 10 km combined pursuit
Bronze medal – third place	1992 Albertville	30 km freestyle
World Championships
Representing Russia
Gold medal – first place	1993 Falun	15 km classical
Gold medal – first place	1993 Falun	4 × 5 km relay
Gold medal – first place	1995 Thunder Bay	30 km freestyle
Gold medal – first place	1995 Thunder Bay	4 × 5 km relay
Gold medal – first place	1997 Trondheim	5 km classical
Gold medal – first place	1997 Trondheim	5 km + 10 km combined pursuit
Gold medal – first place	1997 Trondheim	15 km freestyle
Gold medal – first place	1997 Trondheim	30 km classical
Gold medal – first place	1997 Trondheim	4 × 5 km relay
Silver medal – second place	1995 Thunder Bay	15 km classical
Representing Soviet Union
Gold medal – first place	1989 Lahti	10 km freestyle
Gold medal – first place	1989 Lahti	30 km freestyle
Gold medal – first place	1991 Val di Fiemme	10 km freestyle
Gold medal – first place	1991 Val di Fiemme	15 km classical
Gold medal – first place	1991 Val di Fiemme	4 × 5 km relay
Silver medal – second place	1989 Lahti	4 × 5 km relay
Silver medal – second place	1991 Val di Fiemme	30 km freestyle
Junior World Championships
Representing Soviet Union
Gold medal – first place	1987 Asiago	15 km freestyle
Gold medal – first place	1987 Asiago	3 × 5 km relay
Silver medal – second place	1986 Lake Placid	5 km classical
Silver medal – second place	1986 Lake Placid	3 × 5 km relay
Silver medal – second place	1987 Asiago	5 km classical
Bronze medal – third place	1986 Lake Placid	15 km freestyle

Yelena Valeryevna Välbe (Russian: Елена Валерьевна Вяльбе, née Trubitsyna; born 20 April 1968) is a Russian former cross-country skier. She won a record 14 gold medals (5 in relays) at the FIS World Championships, including all five golds in the 1997 edition. She also won three Olympic gold medals (all in relays) and four bronze medals in various Winter Olympic Games as well as four World Cup Crystal Globes.

In 2004, she lost when she ran for president of the Russian Ski Racing Federation. Välbe was later elected President of the Russian Cross-Country Ski Association and has been in that position since 2010, and manager of the Russian National Cross-Country Team since 2012.

She was elected to the FIS Council in 2021. But after she supported the Russian invasion of Ukraine in 2022, a number of European Ski Federations objected to her participation in the 2022 election, and Välbe's nomination was publicly opposed by the representatives of Sweden, Poland, and Finland. As a result, she was removed from the FIS Council after garnering the fewest votes of 23 candidates. In 2022, Välbe supported the Russian invasion of Ukraine, saying that: "we are not at war with Ukraine and no one attacked it."

== Career ==
=== Summary ===
At the FIS Nordic World Ski Championships, Välbe won fourteen gold (1989: 10 km freestyle, 30 km; 1991: 10 km, 15 km, 4 × 5 km relay; 1993: 15 km, 4 × 5 km relay; 1995: 30 km, 4 × 5 km relay), and three silver medals (1989: 4 × 5 km relay, 1991: 30 km, 1995: 15 km), including all five golds at the 1997 championships in Trondheim (5 km, 5 km + 10 km combined pursuit, 15 km, 30 km, and 4 × 5 km relay). She also won three gold (all in relays) and four bronze medals in various Winter Olympic Games as well as the FIS Cross-Country World Cup five times (1989, 1991, 1992, 1995, 1997). At the 1992 Winter Olympics, she entered in every competition in cross-country skiing and medaled in all of them.

=== After retirement ===
In 2004, she lost when she ran for president of the Russian Ski Racing Federation. In 2010, Välbe was elected as President of the Russian Cross-Country Ski Association. In 2012, she got the position of manager for the Russian Cross-Country Team towards the 2014 Winter Olympics in Sochi. She was also manager for the Russian team during the 2006 Winter Olympics in Turin.

Välbe was elected to the FIS Council in 2021, but after she supported the Russian invasion of Ukraine in 2022, a number of European Ski Federations objected to her participation in the 2022 election, and Välbe's nomination was publicly opposed by the representatives of Sweden, Poland, and Finland. As a result, she was removed from the position after garnering the fewest votes of all 23 candidates.

=== Political career ===
Välbe was a member of the political council of Vladimir Putin's United Russia party in the State Duma from the regional branch, and ran in the 2021 Russian legislative election on the United Russia party list. She won in the United Russia primaries and was leader of United Russia's territorial group No. 29, which included the Vladimir and Ivanovo Oblasts. Having won the elections, she refused to be a deputy, and the Central Election Commission transferred her mandate to Aleksey Govyrin. She eventually withdrew her candidacy.

In 2023, Välbe joined the PutinTeam, whose members supported Vladimir Putin's nomination for the 2024 Russian presidential election.

==== Views ====
In 2022, Välbe supported the Russian invasion of Ukraine, saying that "we are not at war with Ukraine and no one attacked it."

In January 2023, sports commentator Jan Petter Saltvedt of Norwegian Broadcasting Corporation (NRK) said that he believes Välbe must now be fired from all sport-related offices going forward. He said: "It is completely reprehensible that a cross-country president makes such statements [supporting the invasion of Ukraine]. Now she is choosing a confrontational line that either shows her internal position is weakened, or she is confident that Russia will be brought back faster than many thought."

In March 2023, Välbe said the following about European politics and the United States.

I don't understand why everyone is so afraid of America and dependent on it. The world is ruled only by the United States, why hide it. Europe should think hard now: "Guys, what have we done?" Large corporations fled to America. They used to buy Russian gas for 33 kopecks, now they take expensive American gas for 76 kopecks. Whom did they offend or bent, what should they have done? Maybe something I actually can understand. There is a huge amount of weapons that have been lying in storage for 60-70 years. It's all rusty and rotten, where would you get rid of it? Great, let's put it all in there. Today it is Ukraine.

They depend on the USA, because everyone pays with this dollar. An American bank collapsed, and an insurance company from Sweden, the state, kept all the assets there. All.

European politicians today were 90% chosen from a cohort of people who have some kind of terrible kompromat [compromising materials] on them. There are no other explanations. How dare are you to sell out your people in general, to harm them so badly? The main thing is that the United States of America is satisfied! They whole European policy is like that right now.

Look how Georgia Meloni [of Italy] "changed her shoes", who before the elections shouted that she was against these genders [LGBTQ+ community], that no weapons were going to be supplied [to Ukraine]. She was elected and everything changed. The woman turned by 180 degrees. Don't know.

Of course, I have nothing against the gynecologist Ursula von der Leyen [of the European Union]. Maybe she was an excellent doctor, but as the leader of the European coven, she does not cope very well.

In November 2023, she said she supported Putin's policies and Russia's war against Ukraine, and was proud that her younger brother had volunteered to fight in the war. In December 2023, she said of Putin: "I love our president madly."

In September 2024, she said "if Russia dropped a bomb in London, Russians would be allowed to attend the Olympics".

== Personal life ==
Välbe is estranged from her father, Valery Ivanovich Trubitsyn. Her father is Ukrainian-born, and lives in Ukraine.

Explaining her character, she said that as a child, she and her mother Galina Grigorievna Synkova lived with her maternal grandparents. Her maternal grandfather told her: "Don't wait to be hit, hit you in the face first."

Formerly she was married to Estonian cross-country skier Urmas Välbe. Together they had one child the same year they married, Franz, with whom she spent a month and a half in Ukraine in 1988. They separated the year after they married, and divorced in 2005. She later gave birth to Polina and Varvara, and since her divorce moved to and now lives in the Istra district in Moscow Oblast.

== Cross-country skiing results ==
All results are sourced from the International Ski Federation (FIS).

=== Olympic Games ===
- 7 medals – (3 gold, 4 bronze)

Year	Age	5 km	15 km	Pursuit	30 km	4 × 5 km relay
1992	23	Bronze	Bronze	Bronze	Bronze	Gold
1994	25	—	6	—	6	Gold
1998	29	—	17	—	5	Gold

=== World Championships ===
- 17 medals – (14 gold, 3 silver)

Year	Age	5 km	10 km classical	10 km freestyle	15 km	Pursuit	30 km	4 × 5 km relay
1989	20	—N/a	6	Gold	—	—N/a	Gold	Silver
1991	22	19	—N/a	Gold	Gold	—	Silver	Gold
1993	24	4	—N/a	—N/a	Gold	6	19	Gold
1995	26	4	—N/a	—N/a	Silver	12	Gold	Gold
1997	28	Gold	—N/a	—N/a	Gold	Gold	Gold	Gold

=== World Cup ===
==== Season standings ====
Season	Age			
Season	Age	Overall	Long Distance	Sprint
1987	18	23	—N/a	—N/a
1989	20	1st place, gold medalist(s)	—N/a	—N/a
1990	21	2nd place, silver medalist(s)	—N/a	—N/a
1991	22	1st place, gold medalist(s)	—N/a	—N/a
1992	23	1st place, gold medalist(s)	—N/a	—N/a
1993	24	2nd place, silver medalist(s)	—N/a	—N/a
1994	25	3rd place, bronze medalist(s)	—N/a	—N/a
1995	26	1st place, gold medalist(s)	—N/a	—N/a
1996	27	2nd place, silver medalist(s)	—N/a	—N/a
1997	28	1st place, gold medalist(s)	1st place, gold medalist(s)	2nd place, silver medalist(s)
1998	29	12	5	18

==== Individual podiums ====
- 45 victories
- 81 podiums

No.	Season	Date	Location	Race	Level	Place
1	1988–89	10 December 1988	La Féclaz, France	5 km Individual F	World Cup	3rd
2	1988–89	14 December 1988	Campra, Switzerland	15 km Individual F	World Cup	1st
3	1988–89	17 December 1988	Davos, Switzerland	10 km Individual C	World Cup	3rd
4	1988–89	7 January 1989	Kavgolovo, Soviet Union	15 km Individual C	World Cup	1st
5	1988–89	19 February 1989	Lahti, Finland	10 km Individual F	World Championships^{[1]}	1st
6	1988–89	25 February 1989	Lahti, Finland	30 km Individual F	World Championships^{[1]}	1st
7	1988–89	11 March 1989	Falun, Sweden	15 km Individual F	World Cup	1st
8	1989–90	10 December 1989	Soldier Hollow, United States	15 km Individual F	World Cup	3rd
9	1989–90	18 February 1990	Pontresina, Switzerland	15 km Individual F	World Cup	2nd
10	1989–90	20 February 1990	Val di Fiemme, Italy	10 km Individual F	World Cup	1st
11	1989–90	2 March 1990	Lahti, Finland	5 km Individual F	World Cup	1st
12	1989–90	7 March 1990	Sollefteå, Sweden	30 km Individual F	World Cup	3rd
13	1990–91	8 December 1990	Tauplitzalm, Austria	10 km + 15 km Pursuit C/F	World Cup	2nd
14	1990–91	15 December 1990	Davos, Switzerland	15 km Individual C	World Cup	1st
15	1990–91	15 December 1990	Les Saisies, France	5 km + 10 km Pursuit C/F	World Cup	1st
16	1990–91	5 January 1991	Minsk, Soviet Union	30 km Individual C	World Cup	1st
17	1990–91	8 February 1991	Val di Fiemme, Italy	15 km Individual C	World Championships^{[1]}	1st
18	1990–91	10 February 1991	Val di Fiemme, Italy	10 km Individual F	World Championships^{[1]}	1st
19	1990–91	16 February 1991	Val di Fiemme, Italy	30 km Individual F	World Championships^{[1]}	2nd
20	1990–91	2 March 1991	Lahti, Finland	15 km Individual F	World Cup	1st
21	1990–91	9 March 1991	Falun, Sweden	15 km Individual F	World Cup	1st
22	1990–91	16 March 1991	Oslo, Norway	5 km Individual F	World Cup	1st
23	1991–92	7 December 1991	Silver Star, Canada	5 km Individual C	World Cup	1st
24	1991–92	8 December 1991	Silver Star, Canada	10 km Pursuit C	World Cup	2nd
25	1991–92	14 December 1991	Thunder Bay, Canada	5 km Individual F	World Cup	1st
26	1991–92	4 January 1992	Kavgolovo, Russia	15 km Individual C	World Cup	1st
27	1991–92	9 February 1992	Albertville, France	15 km Individual C	Olympic Games^{[1]}	3rd
28	1991–92	13 February 1992	Albertville, France	5 km Individual C	Olympic Games^{[1]}	3rd
29	1991–92	15 February 1992	Albertville, France	10 km Pursuit F	Olympic Games^{[1]}	3rd
30	1991–92	21 February 1992	Albertville, France	10 km Pursuit F	Olympic Games^{[1]}	3rd
31	1991–92	14 March 1992	Vang, Norway	15 km Individual F	World Cup	1st
32	1992–93	12 December 1992	Ramsau, Austria	5 km Individual C	World Cup	2nd
33	1992–93	18 December 1992	Val di Fiemme, Italy	15 km Individual F	World Cup	3rd
34	1992–93	3 January 1993	Kavgolovo, Russia	30 km Individual C	World Cup	2nd
35	1992–93	9 January 1993	Ulrichen, Switzerland	10 km Individual C	World Cup	1st
36	1992–93	16 January 1993	Cogne, Italy	10 km Individual F	World Cup	2nd
37	1992–93	19 February 1993	Falun, Sweden	15 km Individual C	World Championships^{[1]}	1st
38	1992–93	10 March 1993	Lillehammer, Norway	10 km Pursuit F	World Cup	3rd
39	1992–93	19 March 1993	Štrbské Pleso, Slovakia	10 km Individual C	World Cup	1st
40	1993–94	11 December 1993	Santa Caterina, Italy	5 km Individual C	World Cup	1st
41	1993–94	18 December 1993	Davos, Switzerland	10 km Individual F	World Cup	1st
42	1993–94	21 December 1993	Toblach, Italy	15 km Individual C	World Cup	3rd
43	1993–94	8 January 1994	Kavgolovo, Russia	10 km Individual C	World Cup	3rd
44	1993–94	12 March 1994	Falun, Sweden	10 km Individual F	World Cup	2nd
45	1994–95	27 November 1994	Kiruna, Sweden	5 km Individual C	World Cup	1st
46	1994–95	14 December 1994	Tauplitzalm, Austria	10 km Individual C	World Cup	1st
47	1994–95	17 December 1994	Sappada, Italy	15 km Individual F	World Cup	1st
48	1994–95	20 December 1994	Sappada, Italy	5 km Individual F	World Cup	1st
49	1994–95	7 January 1995	Östersund, Sweden	30 km Individual F	World Cup	1st
50	1994–95	14 January 1995	Nové Město, Czech Republic	15 km Individual C	World Cup	1st
51	1994–95	4 February 1995	Falun, Sweden	10 km Individual C	World Cup	2nd
52	1994–95	5 February 1995	Falun, Sweden	10 km Pursuit F	World Cup	1st
53	1994–95	10 March 1995	Thunder Bay, Canada	5 km Individual C	World Championships^{[1]}	2nd
54	1994–95	18 March 1995	Thunder Bay, Canada	30 km Individual F	World Championships^{[1]}	1st
55	1994–95	25 March 1995	Sapporo, Japan	15 km Individual F	World Cup	1st
56	1995–96	25 November 1995	Vuokatti, Finland	5 km Individual C	World Cup	2nd
57	1995–96	29 November 1995	Gällivare, Sweden	10 km Individual F	World Cup	3rd
58	1995–96	9 December 1995	Davos, Switzerland	5 km Individual F	World Cup	1st
59	1995–96	10 December 1995	Davos, Switzerland	10 km Pursuit C	World Cup	2nd
60	1995–96	13 December 1995	Brusson, Italy	10 km Individual F	World Cup	1st
61	1995–96	9 January 1996	Štrbské Pleso, Slovakia	30 km Individual F	World Cup	2nd
62	1995–96	13 January 1996	Nové Město, Czech Republic	10 km Individual C	World Cup	1st
63	1995–96	2 February 1996	Seefeld, Austria	5 km Individual F	World Cup	3rd
64	1995–96	4 February 1996	Reit im Winkl, Germany	1.0 km Sprint F	World Cup	1st
65	1995–96	25 February 1996	Trondheim, Norway	10 km Pursuit F	World Cup	2nd
66	1995–96	10 March 1996	Falun, Sweden	15 km Individual F	World Cup	2nd
67	1996–97	23 November 1996	Kiruna, Sweden	5 km Individual F	World Cup	1st
68	1996–97	7 December 1996	Davos, Switzerland	10 km Individual C	World Cup	2nd
69	1996–97	14 December 1996	Brusson, Italy	15 km Individual F	World Cup	2nd
70	1996–97	5 January 1997	Kavgolovo, Russia	15 km Individual F	World Cup	1st
71	1996–97	11 January 1997	Hakuba, Japan	5 km Individual C	World Cup	3rd
72	1996–97	12 January 1997	Hakuba, Japan	10 km Pursuit F	World Cup	3rd
73	1996–97	18 January 1997	Lahti, Finland	15 km Individual C	World Cup	2nd
74	1996–97	21 February 1997	Trondheim, Norway	15 km Individual F	World Championships^{[1]}	1st
75	1996–97	23 February 1997	Trondheim, Norway	5 km Individual C	World Championships^{[1]}	1st
76	1996–97	24 February 1997	Trondheim, Norway	10 km Pursuit F	World Championships^{[1]}	1st
77	1996–97	1 March 1997	Trondheim, Norway	30 km Individual C	World Championships^{[1]}	1st
78	1996–97	8 March 1997	Falun, Sweden	5 km Individual F	World Cup	1st
79	1996–97	11 March 1997	Sunne, Sweden	1.0 km Sprint F	World Cup	2nd
80	1996–97	15 March 1997	Oslo, Norway	30 km Individual F	World Cup	2nd
81	1997–98	20 December 1997	Davos, Switzerland	15 km Individual C	World Cup	1st

==== Team podiums ====
- 24 victories – (24 RL)
- 32 podiums – (30 RL, 2 TS)

No.	Season	Date	Location	Race	Level	Place	Teammate(s)
1	1986–87	1 March 1987	Lahti, Finland	4 × 5 km Relay C/F	World Cup	1st	Ordina / Lazutina / Reztsova
2	1988–89	23 February 1989	Lahti, Finland	4 × 5 km Relay C/F	World Championships^{[1]}	2nd	Shamshurina / Smetanina / Tikhonova
3	1988–89	12 March 1989	Falun, Sweden	4 × 5 km Relay C	World Cup	2nd	Lazutina / Smetanina / Tikhonova
4	1989–90	11 March 1990	Örnsköldsvik, Sweden	4 × 5 km Relay C/F	World Cup	1st	Yegorova / Lazutina / Tikhonova
5	1990–91	15 February 1991	Val di Fiemme, Italy	4 × 5 km Relay C/F	World Championships^{[1]}	1st	Yegorova / Smetanina / Tikhonova
6	1990–91	10 March 1991	Falun, Sweden	4 × 5 km Relay C	World Cup	1st	Nageykina / Yegorova / Tikhonova
7	1990–91	15 March 1991	Oslo, Norway	4 × 5 km Relay C/F	World Cup	2nd	Nageykina / Smetanina/ Tikhonova
8	1991–92	18 February 1992	Albertville, France	4 × 5 km Relay C/F	Olympic Games^{[1]}	1st	Smetanina/ Lazutina / Yegorova
9	1991–92	8 March 1992	Funäsdalen, Sweden	4 × 5 km Relay C	World Cup	2nd	Lazutina / Nageykina/ Yegorova
10	1992–93	26 February 1993	Falun, Sweden	4 × 5 km Relay C/F	World Championships^{[1]}	1st	Lazutina / Gavrylyuk / Yegorova
11	1993–94	22 February 1994	Lillehammer, Norway	4 × 5 km Relay C/F	Olympic Games^{[1]}	1st	Lazutina / Gavrylyuk / Yegorova
12	1993–94	4 March 1994	Lahti, Finland	4 × 5 km Relay C	World Cup	2nd	Nageykina / Lazutina / Gavrylyuk
13	1993–94	13 March 1994	Falun, Sweden	4 × 5 km Relay F	World Cup	1st	Nageykina / Gavrylyuk / Lazutina
14	1994–95	15 January 1995	Nové Město, Czech Republic	4 × 5 km Relay C	World Cup	1st	Danilova /Gavrylyuk /Lazutina
15	1994–95	29 January 1995	Lahti, Finland	4 × 5 km Relay F	World Cup	1st	Zavyalova / Gavrylyuk / Lazutina
16	1994–95	7 February 1995	Hamar, Norway	4 × 3 km Relay F	World Cup	1st	Danilova / Gavrylyuk /Lazutina
17	1994–95	12 February 1995	Oslo, Norway	4 × 5 km Relay C/F	World Cup	1st	Danilova / Lazutina / Gavrylyuk
18	1994–95	17 March 1995	Thunder Bay, Canada	4 × 5 km Relay C/F	World Championships^{[1]}	1st	Danilova / Lazutina /Gavrylyuk
19	1994–95	26 March 1995	Sapporo, Japan	4 × 5 km Relay C/F	World Cup	1st	Gavrylyuk / Lazutina / Martynova
20	1995–96	17 December 1995	Santa Caterina, Italy	4 × 5 km Relay C	World Cup	1st	Lazutina / Gavrylyuk /Yegorova
21	1995–96	14 January 1996	Nové Město, Czech Republic	4 × 5 km Relay C	World Cup	1st	Nageykina / Lazutina / Gavrylyuk
22	1995–96	2 February 1996	Seefeld, Austria	6 × 1.5 km Team Sprint F	World Cup	3rd	Zavyalova
23	1995–96	10 March 1996	Falun, Sweden	4 × 5 km Relay C/F	World Cup	1st	Gavrylyuk / Lazutina / Yegorova
24	1996–97	24 November 1996	Kiruna, Sweden	4 × 5 km Relay C	World Cup	1st	Gavrylyuk/Lazutina/ Yegorova
25	1996–97	8 December 1996	Davos, Switzerland	4 × 5 km Relay C	World Cup	2nd	Gavrylyuk / Lazutina / Yegorova
26	1996–97	15 December 1996	Brusson, Italy	4 × 5 km Relay F	World Cup	1st	Gavrylyuk / Danilova / Yegorova
27	1996–97	19 January 1997	Lahti, Finland	8 × 1.5 km Team Sprint F	World Cup	2nd	Gavrylyuk
28	1996–97	28 February 1997	Trondheim, Norway	4 × 5 km Relay C/F	World Championships^{[1]}	1st	Danilova/ Lazutina / Gavrylyuk
29	1996–97	9 March 1997	Falun, Sweden	4 × 5 km Relay C/F	World Cup	1st	Danilova /Lazutina / Gavrylyuk
30	1996–97	16 March 1997	Oslo, Norway	4 × 5 km Relay F	World Cup	1st	Danilova /Gavrylyuk / Nageykina
31	1997–98	7 December 1997	Santa Caterina, Italy	4 × 5 km Relay F	World Cup	1st	Chepalova / Lazutina/ Danilova
32	1997–98	14 December 1997	Val di Fiemme, Italy	4 × 5 km Relay F	World Cup	1st	Nageykina / Lazutina / Danilova

Note: ^{1} Until the 1999 World Championships and the 1994 Olympics, World Championship and Olympic races were included in the World Cup scoring system.

== In popular culture ==
- White Snow – a biographical sports drama film about Välbe.
