= Yuliya Shamshurina =

Soviet cross-country skier

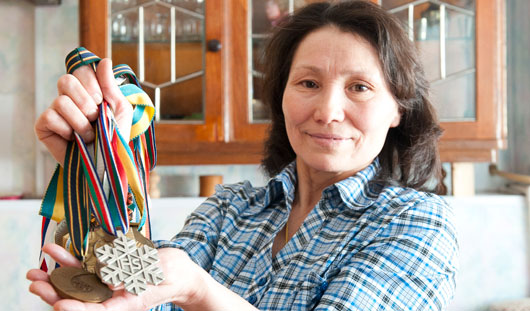

Personal information
- Nationality: Russia
- Born: 16 July 1962 (age 64) Udmurt ASSR, Soviet Union

Sport
- Sport: Skiing

World Cup career
- Seasons: 5 – (1982–1985, 1989)
- Indiv. starts: 19
- Indiv. podiums: 1
- Indiv. wins: 1
- Team starts: 2
- Team podiums: 1
- Team wins: 0
- Overall titles: 0 – (8th in 1989)
Medal record
Women's cross-country skiing
Representing Soviet Union
World Championships
Silver medal – second place	1989 Lahti	4 × 5 km relay
Junior World Championships
Bronze medal – third place	1981 Schonach	3 × 5 km relay

Yuliya Mikhailovna Shamshurina (Russian: Ю́лия Михаловна Шамшу́рина, née Stepanova; born 16 July 1962) is a Soviet cross-country skier who competed from 1982 to 1989, training at VSS Urozhay in Ustinov. She won a silver medal in the 4x5 km at the 1989 FIS Nordic World Ski Championships in Lahti and had her best individual finish of fourth in the 10 km event at those same championships.

At the 1984 Winter Olympics in Sarajevo, Shamshurina (then known as Yuliya Stepanova), she finished fourth in the 4 × 5 km relay and had her best individual finish of eighth in the 10 km event.

Her lone career victory was in a 10 km event in Switzerland in 1988.

== Cross-country skiing results ==
All results are sourced from the International Ski Federation (FIS).

=== Olympic Games ===
Year	Age	5 km	10 km	20 km	4 × 5 km relay
1984	21	12	8	15	4

=== World Championships ===
- 1 medal – (1 silver)

Year	Age	5 km	10 km classical	10 km freestyle	15 km	Pursuit	20 km	30 km	4 × 5 km relay
1985	22	—	7	—N/a	—N/a	—N/a	9	—N/a	—
1989	26	—N/a	4	—	7	—N/a	—N/a	—	Silver

=== World Cup ===
==== Season standings ====
Season	Age	Overall
1982	19	54
1983	20	11
1984	21	23
1985	22	12
1989	26	8

==== Individual podiums ====
- 1 victory
- 1 podium

No.	Season	Date	Location	Race	Level	Place
1	1988–89	17 December 1988	Davos, Switzerland	10 km Individual C	World Cup	1st

==== Team podiums ====
- 1 podium

No.	Season	Date	Location	Race	Level	Place	Teammates
1	1988–89	24 February 1989	Lahti, Finland	4 × 5 km Relay C/F	World Championships^{[1]}	2nd	Smetanina / Tikhonova / Välbe

Note: ^{1} Until the 1999 World Championships, World Championship races were included in the World Cup scoring system.
