= List of multiple Winter Olympic medalists =

This page is a list of various individuals who are multiple Olympic medalists at the Winter Olympic Games.

== List of multiple Winter Olympic medalists ==
This list shows only the athletes who have won at least eight medals at the Winter Olympics.

Still active

Rank	Athlete	Nation	Sport	Category	Gold medal	Silver medal	Bronze medal	
1	Marit Bjørgen	Norway	Cross-country	F	8	4	3	15
2	Ole Einar Bjørndalen	Norway	Biathlon	M	8	4	2	14
3	Arianna Fontana	Italy	Short track	F	3	6	5	14
4	Johannes Høsflot Klæbo	Norway	Cross-country	M	11	1	1	13
5	Ireen Wüst	Netherlands	Speed skating	F	6	5	2	13
6	Bjørn Dæhlie	Norway	Cross-country	M	8	4	0	12
7	Raisa Smetanina	Soviet Union; Unified Team	Cross-country	F	4	5	1	10
8	Miho Takagi	Japan	Speed skating	F	2	4	4	10
9	Stefania Belmondo	Italy	Cross-country	F	2	3	5	10
10	Lyubov Yegorova	Unified Team; Russia	Cross-country	F	6	3	0	9
11	Quentin Fillon Maillet	France	Biathlon	M	5	3	1	9
12	Claudia Pechstein	Germany	Speed skating	F	5	2	2	9
12	Johannes Thingnes Bø	Norway	Biathlon	M	5	2	2	9
14	Sixten Jernberg	Sweden	Cross-country	M	4	3	2	9
14	Emil Hegle Svendsen	Norway	Biathlon	M	4	3	2	9
16	Sven Kramer	Netherlands	Speed skating	M	4	2	3	9
17	Charlotte Kalla	Sweden	Cross-country	F	3	6	0	9
18	Alexander Bolshunov	(International Olympic Committee) Olympic Athletes from Russia; ROC	Cross-country	M	3	4	2	9
19	Uschi Disl	Germany	Biathlon	F	2	4	3	9
20	Tobias Arlt	Germany	Luge	M	7	0	1	8
20	Tobias Wendl	Germany	Luge	M	7	0	1	8
22	Viktor Ahn	South Korea; Russia	Short track	M	6	0	2	8
23	Ricco Groß	Germany	Biathlon	M	4	3	1	8
24	Galina Kulakova	Soviet Union	Cross-country	F	4	2	2	8
24	Kjetil André Aamodt	Norway	Alpine skiing	M	4	2	2	8
24	Sven Fischer	Germany	Biathlon	M	4	2	2	8
27	Karin Enke	East Germany	Speed skating	F	3	4	1	8
27	Gunda Niemann-Stirnemann	Germany	Speed skating	F	3	4	1	8
29	Apolo Anton Ohno	United States	Short track	M	2	2	4	8
29	Tiril Eckhoff	Norway	Biathlon	F	2	2	4	8

== Most medals in one individual event ==
This list shows only the athletes who have won at least four medals in the same individual event at the Winter Olympics.

Rank	Athlete	Nation	Sport	Event	Editions	Gold medal	Silver medal	Bronze medal	
1	Armin Zöggeler	Italy	Luge	Singles	1994–2014	2	1	3	6
2	Georg Hackl	West Germany; Germany	Luge	Singles	1988–2002	3	2	0	5
3	Claudia Pechstein	Germany	Speed skating	5000 m	1992–2006	3	1	1	5
3	Ireen Wüst	Netherlands	Speed skating	1500 m	2006–2022	3	1	1	5
5	Arianna Fontana	Italy	Short track	500 m	2006–2026	2	2	1	5
6	Gillis Grafström^{[a]}	Sweden	Figure skating	Individual	1920–1932	3	1	0	4
6	Sven Kramer	Netherlands	Speed skating	5000 m	2006–2018	3	1	0	4
8	Kjetil André Aamodt	Norway	Alpine skiing	Super G	1992–2006	3	0	1	4
8	Natalie Geisenberger	Germany	Luge	Singles	2010–2022	3	0	1	4
10	Martina Sáblíková	Czech Republic	Speed skating	5000 m	2010–2022	2	1	1	4
11	Bob de Jong	Netherlands	Speed skating	10,000 m	1998–2014	1	1	2	4

^{a} Figure skating was a Summer Olympic sport in 1920. It became a Winter Olympic sport in 1924, when the first Winter Olympic Games were held.

== See also ==
- List of multiple Summer Olympic medalists
- List of multiple Olympic medalists
- List of multiple Olympic medalists at a single Games
- List of multiple Olympic medalists in one event
- List of athletes with the most appearances at Olympic Games
- List of Olympians who won medals in the Summer and Winter Games
