= Puolanka =

- Municipality
- Puolangan kunta Puolanka kommun
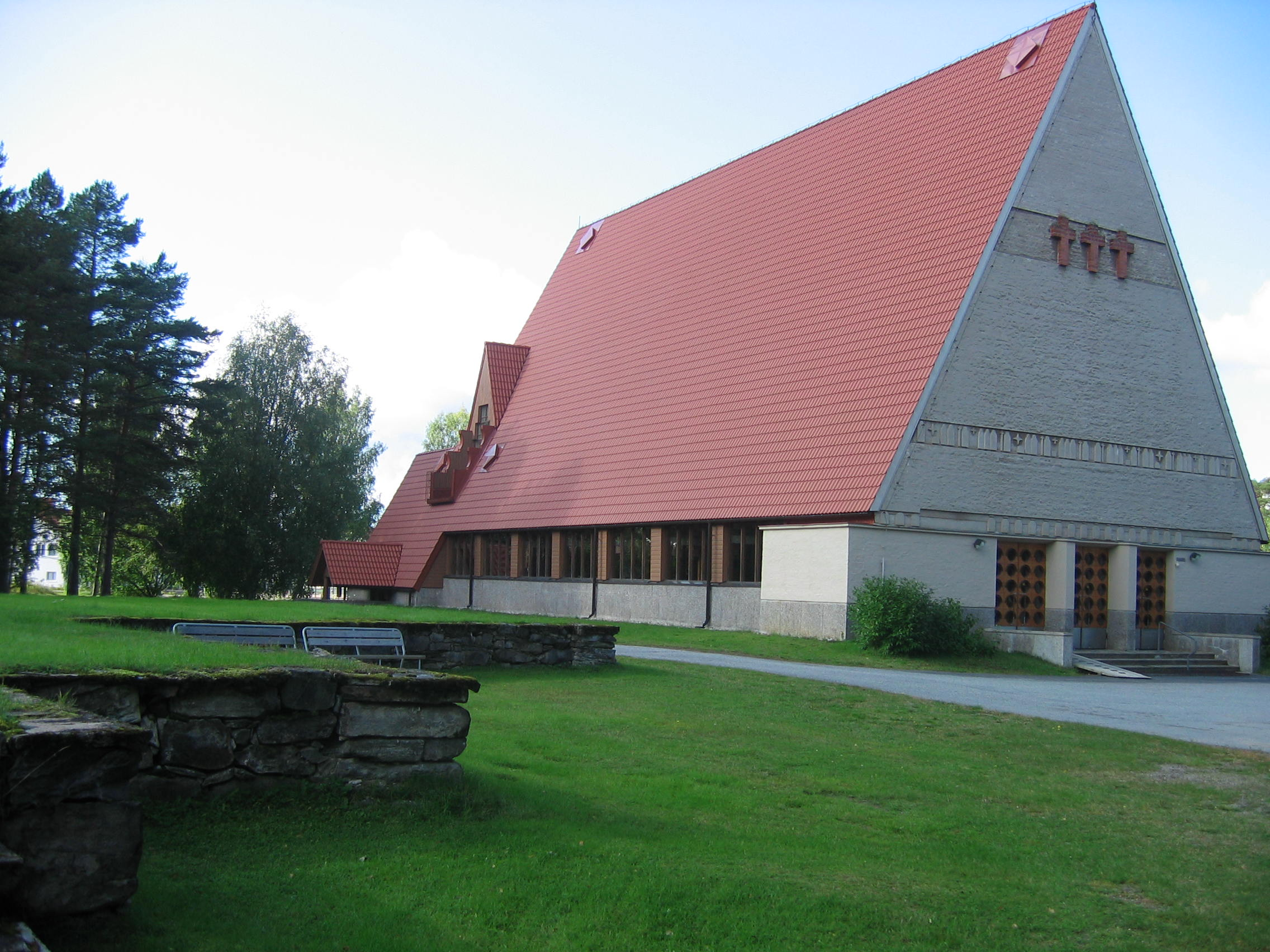
- Puolanka Church

- Coat of arms

- Location of Puolanka in Finland
- Interactive map of Puolanka
- Coordinates: 64°52′05″N 027°40′15″E
- Country: Finland
- Region: Kainuu
- Sub-region: Kehys-Kainuu

Government
  - Mayor: Harri Peltola

Area (2018-01-01)
  - Total: 2,598.68 km^{2} (1,003.36 sq mi)
  - Land: 2,461.17 km^{2} (950.26 sq mi)
  - Water: 137.3 km^{2} (53.0 sq mi)
  - Rank: 24th largest in Finland

Population (2025-12-31)
  - Total: 2,322
  - Rank: 242nd largest in Finland
  - Density: 0.94/km^{2} (2.4/sq mi)

Population by native language
  - Finnish: 96% (official)
  - Others: 4%

Population by age
  - 0 to 14: 9.1%
  - 15 to 64: 51.5%
  - 65 or older: 39.5%
- Time zone: UTC+02:00 (EET)
  - Summer (DST): UTC+03:00 (EEST)
- Website: puolanka.fi

Puolanka (Finnish: [ˈpuo̯lɑŋkɑ]; Swedish: Puolanka, also Puolango) is a municipality in Finland located in the Kainuu region. The municipality has a population of 2,322 (31 December 2025) and covers an area of 2,598.68 square kilometres (1,003.36 sq mi) of which 137.3 km^{2} (53.0 sq mi) is water. The population density is 0.94 inhabitants per square kilometre (2.4/sq mi). The municipality is unilingually Finnish.

The fir-tree topped line in the coat of arms of Puolanka refers to local forestry and the cattle bells to livestock management and past grazing in forest lands. The coat of arms was designed by Aake Kaarnama, and the Puolanka municipal council approved it at its meeting on 8 June 1962. The Ministry of the Interior approved the coat of arms for use on 29 August of the same year.

Puolanka has been called the "most pessimistic municipality in Finland". In 2019, the municipality gained worldwide publicity when the BBC published a video about Puolanka, describing it as the "most pessimistic town in the world". Pessimism has a long tradition in the Kainuu region, and the residents of Puolanka decided to make it their trademark, which is why the residents organize various events related to the topic every year.

The name Puolanka is of Sámi origin, meaning "burning land" (compare to modern Northern Sámi word buollán "burning land"), with -nka being a Finnish feature.

== History ==
The first permanent settlers in Puolanka came in the 1550s.

The municipality of Puolanka was established in the year of 1867. In that same year the Puolanka parish became independent from the Hyrynsalmi church to which it had previously belonged to administratively. The municipal council of Puolanka was formed in the year of 1916.

At its peak Puolanka had a population of about 7,520 in 1960. Towards the end of the 1960s, however, Puolanka's population began to decline, alike other municipalities within Kainuu.

== Geography ==
Ranked one of the most beautiful waterfalls in Finland, the 24-metre-high (79 ft) Hepoköngäs, is located 16 kilometres (10 mi) from the center of Puolanka.

Climate data for Puolanka Kotila (1991-2020 normals)
Month	Jan	Feb	Mar	Apr	May	Jun	Jul	Aug	Sep	Oct	Nov	Dec	Year
Average precipitation mm (inches)	55 (2.2)	47 (1.9)	43 (1.7)	37 (1.5)	64 (2.5)	74 (2.9)	99 (3.9)	88 (3.5)	75 (3.0)	80 (3.1)	76 (3.0)	68 (2.7)	806 (31.7)
Average precipitation days (≥ 0.1 mm)	23	19	16	14	16	16	18	17	18	21	23	23	224
Source: https://www.ilmatieteenlaitos.fi/1991-2020-sadetilastot

=== Villages ===
Villages within Puolanka are as follows:

- Aittokylä
- Auho
- Joukokylä
- Kivarinjärvi
- Kotila
- Kongasmäki
- Leipivaara
- Lylykylä
- Naulaperä
- Puokio
- Puolanka
- Rasinkylä
- Suolijärvi
- Vihajärvi
- Väyrylä
- Yli-Oterma
- Törmänmäki

== Politics ==
Results of the 2023 Finnish parliamentary election in Puolanka:

- Centre Party 38.0%
- Finns Party 25.6%
- Left Alliance 13.3%
- Social Democratic Party 8.1%
- National Coalition Party 5.4%
- Christian Democrats 3.4%
- Green League 1.9%
- Power Belongs to the People 1.7%

As of 2021 Finnish municipal elections, Puolanka municipal council is made up of: Centre Party (13 seats), Left Alliance (4), and Finns Party (4).

== Notable individuals ==
- Juha Sipilä, the Prime Minister of Finland 2015−2019
- Louis Moilanen, giant
- Markku Kukkoaho, sprinter
- Santeri Haapanen, politician
- Tuulikki Pyykkönen, Olympic cross-country skier

== Gallery ==
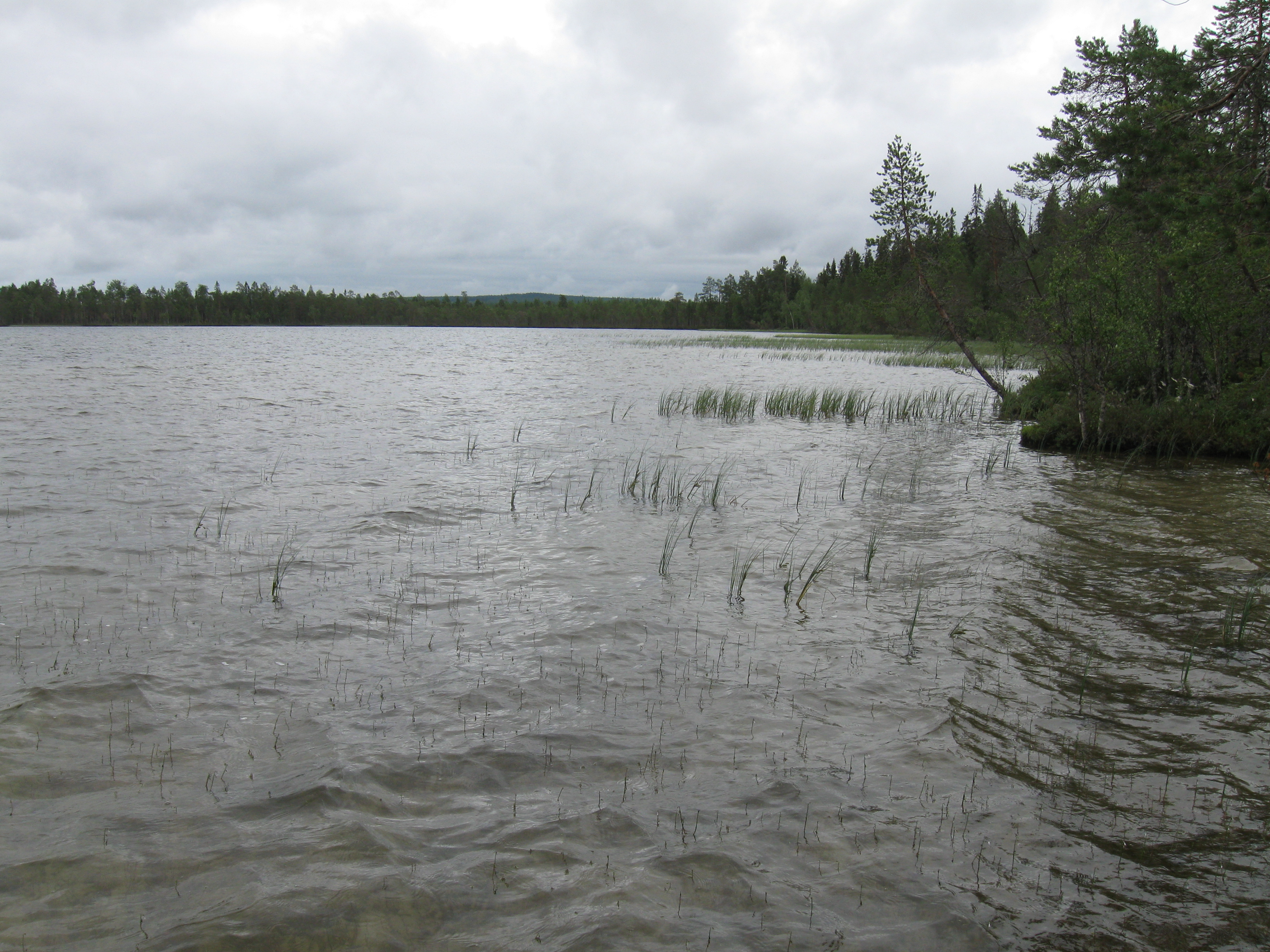
Lake Kalettomanlampi in Puolanka, seen from the southernmost shore towards northeast.

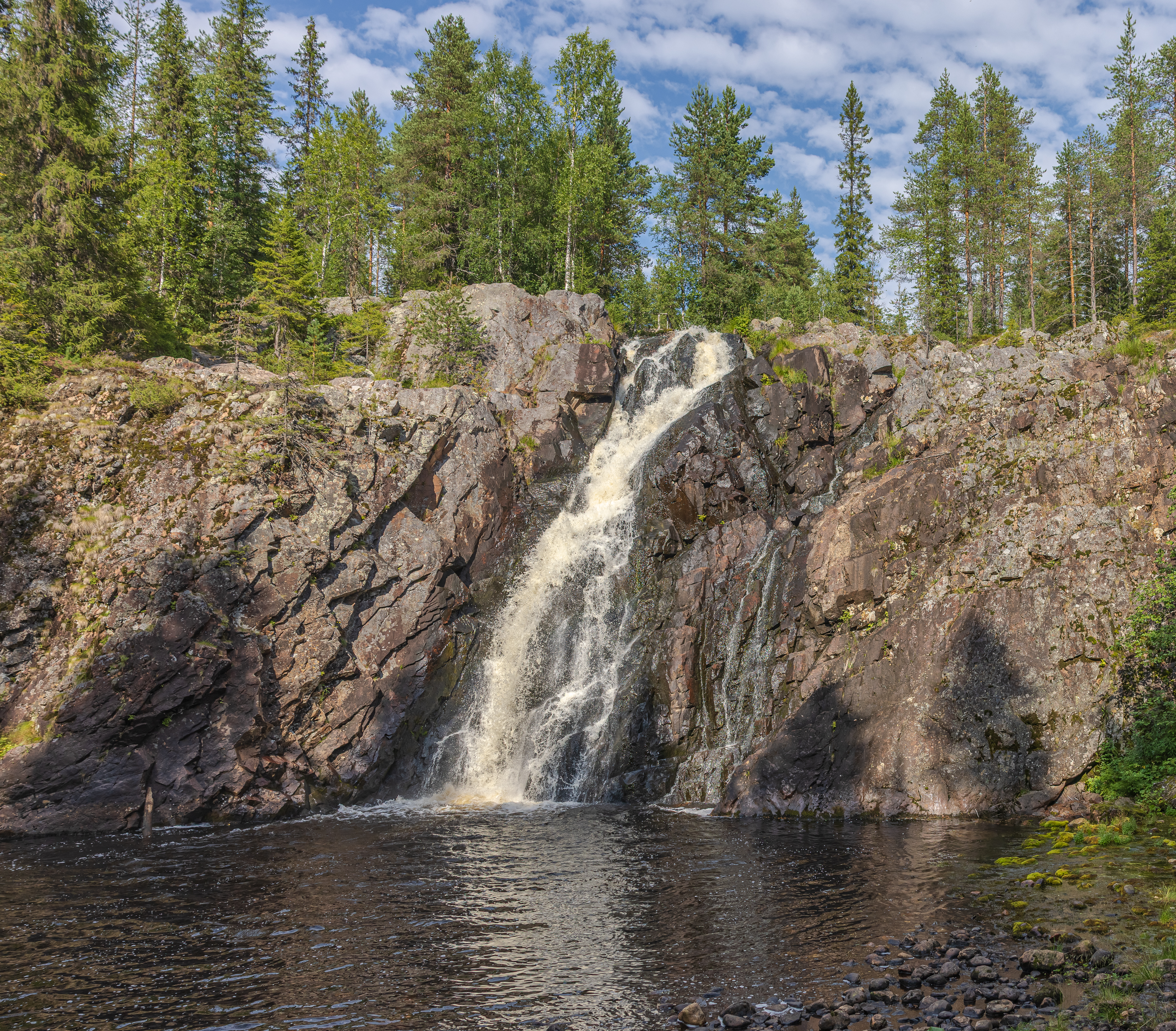
With its drop of 24 meters, Hepoköngäs is the highest waterfall in Kainuu.

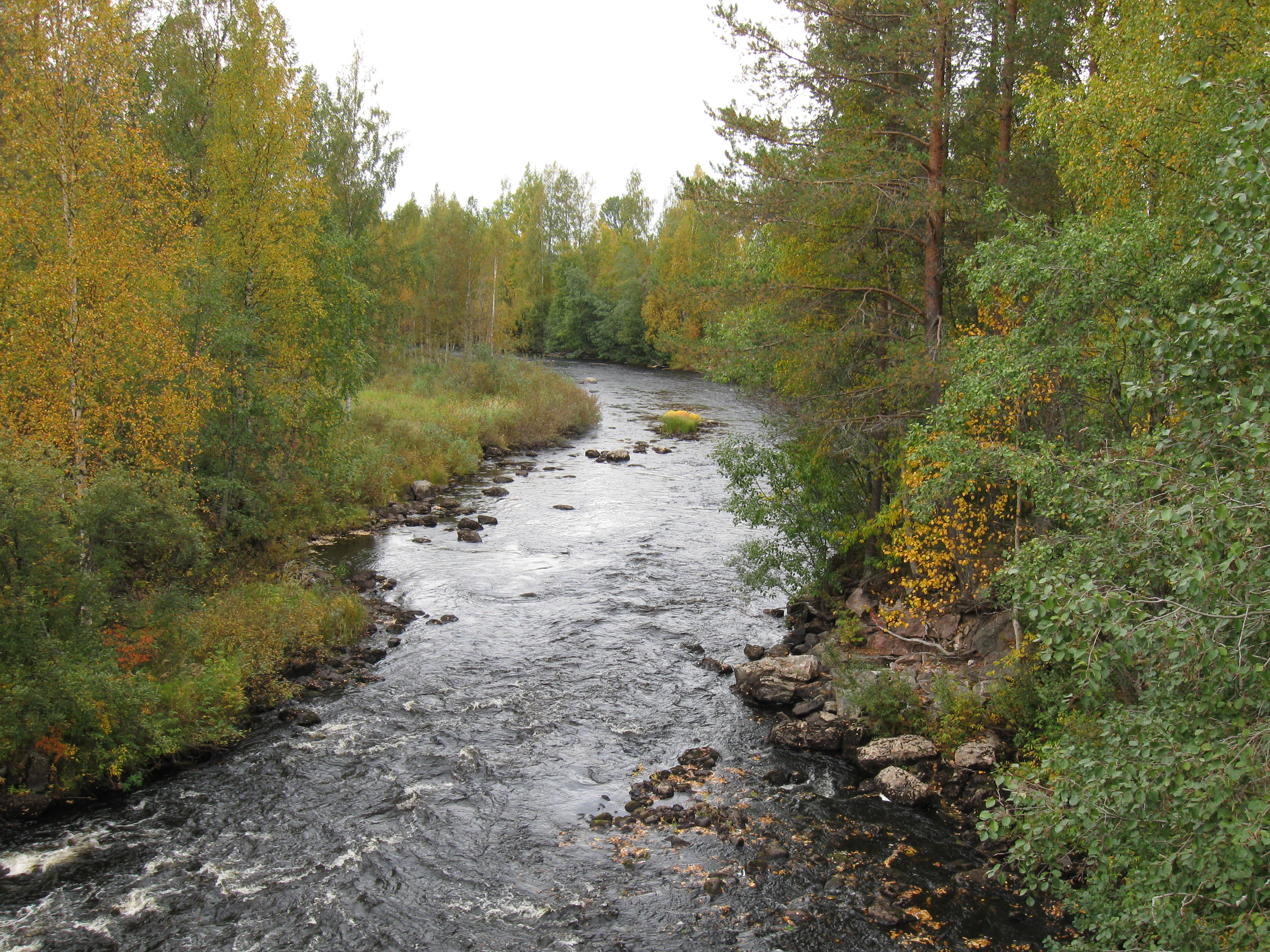
The river Keskijoki in Puolanka.

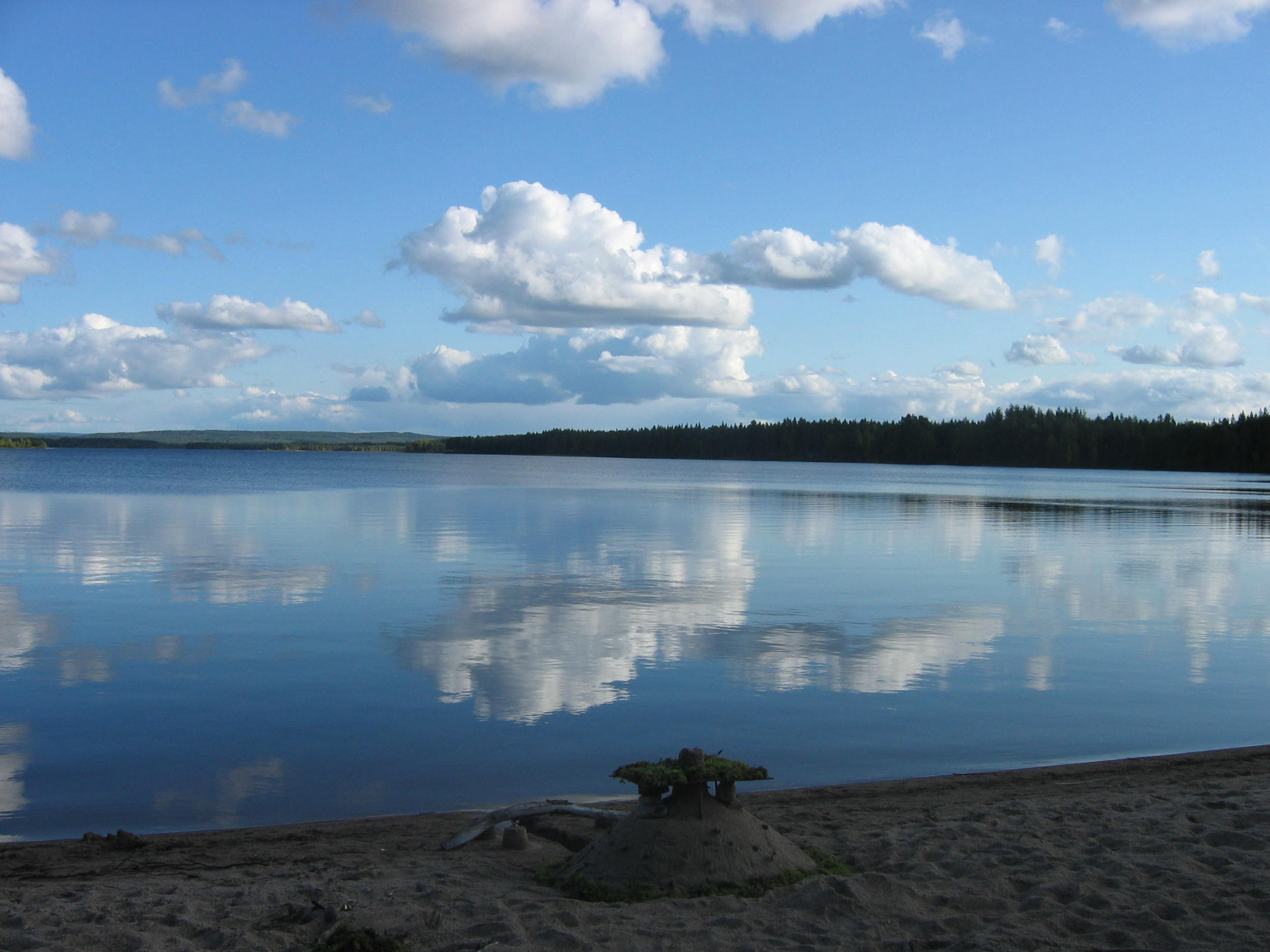
The lake of Pirttijärvi in Puolanka, seen from the beach at the North-Western end of the lake towards southeast.
