= Kati Lehtonen =

Finnish cross-country skier

Personal information
- Nationality: Finland
- Born: 6 April 1975 (age 51) Sulkava, Finland

Sport
- Sport: Skiing
- Club: Sulkavan Urheilijat -41

World Cup career
- Seasons: 4 – (1995–1998)
- Indiv. starts: 34
- Indiv. podiums: 0
- Team starts: 14
- Team podiums: 3
- Team wins: 0
- Overall titles: 0 – (24th in 1996)
- Discipline titles: 0
Medal record
Representing Finland
Women's cross-country skiing
World Championships
Bronze medal – third place	1997 Trondheim	4 × 5 km relay
Junior World Championships
Bronze medal – third place	1995 Gällivare	4 × 5 km relay

Kati Lehtonen (née Pulkkinen, born 6 April 1975) is a Finnish former cross-country skier who competed from 1995 to 2002. She won a bronze medal at the 4 × 5 km relay in the 1997 FIS Nordic World Ski Championships and had her best finish of 16th in two events (5 km + 10 km combined pursuit, 30 km) at those same championships.

Lehtonen's best individual finish at the Winter Olympics was 51st in the 5 km + 10 km combined pursuit at Nagano in 1998. Her only individual victory was in a 5 km event in Finland in 1997.

== Cross-country skiing results ==
All results are sourced from the International Ski Federation (FIS).

=== Olympic Games ===
Year	Age	5 km	15 km	Pursuit	30 km	4 × 5 km relay
1998	22	57	—	51	—	—

=== World Championships ===
- 1 medal – (1 bronze)

Year	Age	5 km	15 km	Pursuit	30 km	4 × 5 km relay
1997	21	25	19	16	16	Bronze

=== World Cup ===
==== Season standings ====
Season	Age	Overall	Long Distance	Sprint
1995	19	58	—N/a	—N/a
1996	20	24	—N/a	—N/a
1997	21	37	36	56
1998	22	54	NC	47

==== Team podiums ====
- 3 podiums

No.	Season	Date	Location	Race	Level	Place	Teammates
1	1995–96	17 March 1996	Oslo, Norway	4 × 5 km Relay C/F	World Cup	2nd	Sirviö / Pyykkönen / Kittilä
2	1996–97	28 February 1997	Trondheim, Norway	4 × 5 km Relay C/F	World Championships^{[1]}	3rd	Sirviö / Pyykkönen / Salonen
3	1996–97	9 March 1997	Falun, Sweden	4 × 5 km Relay C/F	World Cup	3rd	Pyykkönen / Sirviö / Salonen

Note: ^{1} Until the 1999 World Championships, World Championship races were included in the World Cup scoring system.
