= Erja (given name) =

Erja is a feminine given name. Notable people with the name include:

- Erja Jokinen (born 1979), Finnish ski orienteer
- Erja Kuivalainen (born 1964), Finnish cross-country skier
- Erja Lahikainen (1954–2025), Finnish parliamentarian
- Erja Lyytinen (born 1976), Finnish musician
