= Jaana Savolainen =

Finnish cross-country skier

Personal information
- Full name: Jaana Maarit Savolainen
- Nationality: Finland
- Born: 23 January 1964 (age 62) Lappeenranta, Finland

Sport
- Sport: Skiing

World Cup career
- Seasons: 11 – (1983–1993)
- Indiv. starts: 33
- Indiv. podiums: 4
- Indiv. wins: 2
- Team starts: 13
- Team podiums: 8
- Team wins: 1
- Overall titles: 0 – (8th in 1986)
Medal record
Women's cross-country skiing
Representing Finland
Olympic Games
Bronze medal – third place	1988 Calgary	4 × 5 km relay
World Championships
Gold medal – first place	1989 Lahti	4 × 5 km relay
Junior World Championships
Gold medal – first place	1983 Kuopio	3 × 5 km relay
Silver medal – second place	1982 Murau	3 × 5 km relay

Jaana Maarit Savolainen (born 23 January 1964) is a Finnish former cross-country skier who competed from 1984 to 1993. She won a bronze medal in the 4 × 5 km relay at the 1988 Winter Olympics in Calgary and finished 18th in the 5 km + 10 km combined pursuit event at the 1992 Winter Olympics in Albertville.

Savolainen also won a gold medal in the 4 × 5 km relay at the 1989 FIS Nordic World Ski Championships in Lahti. She also won the 10 km event at the Holmenkollen ski festival in 1986.

== Cross-country skiing results ==
All results are sourced from the International Ski Federation (FIS).

=== Olympic Games ===
- 1 medal – (1 bronze)

Year	Age	5 km	10 km	15 km	Pursuit	20 km	30 km	4 × 5 km relay
1988	24	—	—	—N/a	—N/a	28	—N/a	Bronze
1992	28	26	—N/a	—	18	—N/a	28	4

=== World Championships ===
- 1 medal – (1 gold)

Year	Age	5 km	10 km classical	10 km freestyle	15 km	20 km	30 km	4 × 5 km relay
1985	21	—	30	—N/a	—N/a	24	—N/a	4
1987	23	29	—	—N/a	—N/a	33	—N/a	6
1989	25	—N/a	—	16	—	—N/a	—	Gold
1991	27	—	—N/a	20	—	—N/a	—	—

=== World Cup ===
==== Season standings ====
Season	Age	Overall
1983	19	NC
1984	20	28
1985	21	NC
1986	22	8
1987	23	56
1988	24	28
1989	25	28
1990	26	9
1991	27	NC
1992	28	13
1993	29	58

==== Individual podiums ====
- 2 victories
- 4 podiums

No.	Season	Date	Location	Race	Level	Place
1	1985–86	7 December 1985	Labrador City, Canada	5 km Individual F	World Cup	3rd
2	1985–86	15 March 1986	Oslo, Norway	10 km Individual F	World Cup	1st
3	1987–88	13 December 1987	La Clusaz, France	5 km Individual F	World Cup	2nd
4	1989–90	9 December 1989	Soldier Hollow, United States	5 km Individual C	World Cup	1st

==== Team podiums ====
- 1 victory
- 8 podiums

No.	Season	Date	Location	Race	Level	Place	Teammates
1	1983–84	26 February 1984	(Sweden) Falun, Italy	4 × 5 km Relay	World Cup	2nd	Määttä / Hyytiäinen / Hämäläinen
2	1985–86	1 March 1986	Lahti, Finland	4 × 5 km Relay C	World Cup	3rd	Määttä / Hyytiäinen / Matikainen
3	1986–87	1 March 1987	Lahti, Finland	4 × 5 km Relay C/F	World Cup	3rd	Pyykkönen / Määttä / Matikainen
4	1987–88	21 February 1988	Calgary, Canada	4 × 5 km Relay F	Olympic Games^{[1]}	3rd	Määttä / Kirvesniemi / Matikainen
5	1988–89	23 February 1989	Lahti, Finland	4 × 5 km Relay C/F	World Championships^{[1]}	1st	Määttä / Kirvesniemi / Matikainen
6	1989–90	11 March 1990	Örnsköldsvik, Sweden	4 × 5 km Relay C/F	World Cup	3rd	Pyykkönen / Määttä / Kuivalainen
7	1990–91	10 March 1991	Falun, Sweden	4 × 5 km Relay C	World Cup	3rd	Lukkarinen / Lahtinen / Kirvesniemi
8	1991–92	8 March 1992	Funäsdalen, Sweden	4 × 5 km Relay C	World Cup	3rd	Riikola / Lukkarinen / Kirvesniemi

Note: ^{1} Until the 1999 World Championships and the 1994 Olympics, World Championship and Olympic races were included in the World Cup scoring system.
