= Erja Kuivalainen =

Finnish cross-country skier

Personal information
- Full name: Erja Kaarina Orvokki Kuivalainen
- Nationality: Finland
- Born: 21 October 1964 (age 61) Ilomantsi, Finland

Sport
- Sport: Skiing
- Club: Ilomantsin Urheilijat

World Cup career
- Seasons: 9 – (1984–1985, 1987–1990, 1992–1993, 1996)
- Indiv. starts: 12
- Indiv. podiums: 0
- Team starts: 3
- Team podiums: 2
- Team wins: 0
- Overall titles: 0 – (36th in 1990)

Erja Kuivalainen (born 21 October 1964) is a Finnish cross-country skier. She competed in two events at the 1984 Winter Olympics.

== Cross-country skiing results ==
All results are sourced from the International Ski Federation (FIS).

=== Olympic Games ===
Year	Age	5 km	10 km	20 km	4 × 5 km relay
1984	19	—	37	29	—

=== World Championships ===
Year	Age	5 km	10 km classical	10 km freestyle	15 km	30 km	4 × 5 km relay
1989	24	—N/a	—	27	—	—	—
1991	26	—	—N/a	31	—	42	—

=== World Cup ===
==== Season standings ====
Season	Age	Overall
1984	19	NC
1985	20	NC
1987	22	NC
1988	23	51
1989	24	NC
1990	25	36
1992	27	NC
1993	28	NC
1996	31	NC

==== Team podiums ====
- 2 podiums

No.	Season	Date	Location	Race	Level	Place	Teammates
1	1989–90	4 March 1990	Lahti, Finland	4 × 5 km Relay F	World Cup	3rd	Määttä / Hyytiäinen / Pyykkönen
2	1989–90	11 March 1990	Örnsköldsvik, Sweden	4 × 5 km Relay C/F	World Cup	3rd	Pyykkönen / Määttä / Savolainen
