= Satu Salonen =

Finnish cross-country skier (born 1973)

Personal information
- Full name: Satu Maarit Anneli Salonen
- Nationality: Finland
- Born: 27 February 1973 (age 53) Vahto, Finland

Sport
- Sport: Skiing
- Club: Vahdon Tuisku

World Cup career
- Seasons: 10 – (1996–2002, 2004–2006)
- Indiv. starts: 79
- Indiv. podiums: 0
- Team starts: 26
- Team podiums: 4
- Team wins: 0
- Overall titles: 0 – (22nd in 1999)
- Discipline titles: 0
Medal record
Women's cross-country skiing
Representing Finland
World Championships
Bronze medal – third place	1997 Trondheim	4 × 5 km relay
Junior World Championships
Gold medal – first place	1992 Vuokatti	4 × 5 km relay

Satu Maarit Anneli Salonen (born 27 February 1973 in Vahto) is a Finnish former cross-country skier who competed from 1993 to 2005. She won a bronze medal at the 4 × 5 km relay in the 1997 FIS Nordic World Ski Championships and had her best finish of 12th in the 5 km event at those same championships.

Salonen's best individual finish at the Winter Olympics was seventh in the 10 km at Salt Lake City in 2002. Her best individual finishes was second twice in Finland (2001, 2005).

== Cross-country skiing results ==
All results are sourced from the International Ski Federation (FIS).

=== Olympic Games ===
Year	Age	5 km	10 km	15 km	Pursuit	30 km	Sprint	4 × 5 km relay
1998	24	18	—N/a	18	16	—	—N/a	7
2002	28	—N/a	7	—	36	DNF	—	7

=== World Championships ===
- 1 medal – (1 bronze)

Year	Age	5 km	15 km	Pursuit	30 km	4 × 5 km relay
1997	23	12	26	19	22	Bronze
1999	25	18	DNF	DNS	14	11

=== World Cup ===
==== Season standings ====
Season	Age					
Season	Age	Overall	Distance	Long Distance	Middle Distance	Sprint
1996	23	NC	—N/a	—N/a	—N/a	—N/a
1997	24	31	—N/a	29	—N/a	43
1998	25	39	—N/a	26	—N/a	54
1999	26	22	—N/a	25	—N/a	27
2000	27	52	—N/a	56	39	—
2001	28	45	—N/a	—N/a	—N/a	—
2002	29	30	—N/a	—N/a	—N/a	—
2004	31	29	22	—N/a	—N/a	—
2005	32	76	48	—N/a	—N/a	—
2006	33	NC	NC	—N/a	—N/a	—

==== Team podiums ====
- 4 podiums

No.	Season	Date	Location	Race	Level	Place	Teammates
1	1996–97	28 February 1997	Trondheim, Norway	4 × 5 km Relay C/F	World Championships^{[1]}	3rd	Sirviö / Pyykkönen / Pulkkinen
2	1996–97	9 March 1997	Falun, Sweden	4 × 5 km Relay C/F	World Cup	3rd	Pyykkönen / Sirviö / Pulkkinen
3	2000–01	16 December 2000	Santa Caterina, Italy	4 × 3 km Relay C/F	World Cup	3rd	Manninen / Kuitunen / Jauho
4	2003–04	22 February 2004	Umeå, Sweden	4 × 5 km Relay C/F	World Cup	3rd	Saarinen / Sarasoja-Lilja / Sundqvist

Note: ^{1} Until the 1999 World Championships, World Championship races were included in the World Cup scoring system.
