= Riikka Sirviö =

Finnish cross-country skier

Personal information
- Nationality: Finland
- Born: 11 April 1974 (age 52) Kajaani, Finland

Sport
- Sport: Skiing
- Club: Jyväskylän Hiihtoseura

World Cup career
- Seasons: 9 – (1995–2003)
- Indiv. starts: 76
- Indiv. podiums: 0
- Team starts: 25
- Team podiums: 5
- Team wins: 0
- Overall titles: 0 – (25th in 2001)
- Discipline titles: 0
Medal record
Representing Finland
Women's cross-country skiing
World Championships
Bronze medal – third place	1997 Trondheim	4 × 5 km relay

Riikka Sirviö (born 11 April 1974) is a Finnish former cross-country skier who competed from 1994 to 2003. She won a bronze medal at the 4 × 5 km relay in the 1997 FIS Nordic World Ski Championships and had her best finish of sixth in the 15 km event at the 1991 FIS Nordic World Ski Championships.

Sirviö had seven individual victories at 5 km (all in Finland) from 1997 to 2002.

== Cross-country skiing results ==
All results are sourced from the International Ski Federation (FIS).

=== World Championships ===
- 1 medal – (1 bronze)

Year	Age	5 km individual	10 km individual	15 km	Pursuit	30 km	Sprint	4 × 5 km relay
1997	22	10	—N/a	—	21	14	—N/a	Bronze
1999	24	28	—N/a	—	32	—	—N/a	11
2001	26	—N/a	15	—	—	CNX^{[a]}	—	—
2003	28	—N/a	12	6	—	—	30	DSQ

a. ^{1} Cancelled due to extremely cold weather.

=== World Cup ===
==== Season standings ====
Season	Age				
Season	Age	Overall	Long Distance	Middle Distance	Sprint
1995	20	NC	—N/a	—N/a	—N/a
1996	21	33	—N/a	—N/a	—N/a
1997	22	28	31	—N/a	47
1998	23	49	NC	—N/a	39
1999	24	61	NC	—N/a	69
2000	25	35	53	45	22
2001	26	25	—N/a	—N/a	38
2002	27	36	—N/a	—N/a	26
2003	28	39	—N/a	—N/a	27

==== Team podiums ====
- 5 podiums – (4 RL, 1 TS)

No.	Season	Date	Location	Race	Level	Place	Teammate(s)
1	1995–96	17 March 1996	Oslo, Norway	4 × 5 km Relay C/F	World Cup	2nd	Pyykkönen / Pulkkinen / Kittilä
2	1996–97	28 February 1997	Trondheim, Norway	4 × 5 km Relay C/F	World Championships^{[1]}	3rd	Pyykkönen / Pulkkinen / Salonen
3	1996–97	9 March 1997	Falun, Sweden	4 × 5 km Relay C/F	World Cup	3rd	Pyykkönen / Pulkkinen / Salonen
4	2000–01	13 January 2001	Soldier Hollow, United States	4 × 5 km Relay C/F	World Cup	3rd	Rauhala / Välimaa / Saarinen
5	2001–02	13 January 2002	Nové Město, Czech Republic	4 × 1.5 km Team Sprint F	World Cup	3rd	Roponen

Note: ^{1} Until the 1999 World Championships, World Championship races were included in the World Cup scoring system.
