= Svetlana Nageykina =

Russian cross-country skier

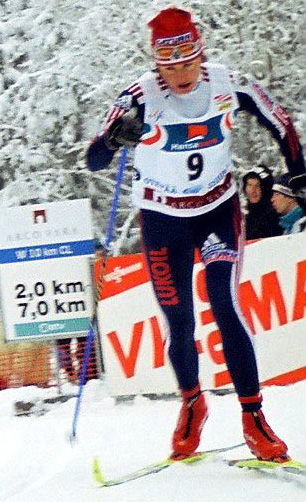
- Nageykina in 2006

Personal information
- Nationality: Russia
- Born: 2 February 1965 (age 61) Tambov, Russian SFSR, Soviet Union

Sport
- Sport: Skiing

World Cup career
- Seasons: 20 – (1986–1994, 1996–2004, 2006–2007)
- Indiv. starts: 172
- Indiv. podiums: 18
- Indiv. wins: 1
- Team starts: 35
- Team podiums: 25
- Team wins: 13
- Overall titles: 0 – (4th in 1990)
- Discipline titles: 0
Medal record
Women's cross-country skiing
Representing Soviet Union
Olympic Games
Gold medal – first place	1988 Calgary	4 × 5 km relay

Svetlana Vyacheslavovna Nageykina (Russian: Светла́на Вячесла́вовна Наге́йкина; born 2 February 1965) is a Soviet/Russian former cross-country skier who competed during the 1980s, training at Spartak. She won a gold medal in the 4 × 5 km relay at the 1988 Winter Olympics in Calgary for the Soviet Union.

In 2000 and 2002, she won Vasaloppet.

== Cross-country skiing results ==
All results are sourced from the International Ski Federation (FIS).

=== Olympic Games ===
- 1 medal – (1 gold)

Year	Age	5 km	10 km	15 km	Pursuit	20 km	30 km	Sprint	4 × 5 km relay
1988	23	8	4	—N/a	—N/a	—	—N/a	—N/a	Gold
1994	29	16	—N/a	—	19	—N/a	9	—N/a	—
1998	33	—	—N/a	16	—	—N/a	—	—N/a	—
2002	37	—N/a	14	5	—	—N/a	11	—	5

=== World Championships ===
Year	Age	5 km	10 km	15 km	Pursuit	30 km	Sprint	4 × 5 km relay
1991	26	21	14	8	—N/a	5	—N/a	—
1993	28	—	—N/a	19	—	31	—N/a	—
1997	32	—	—N/a	—	—	10	—N/a	—
1999	34	4	—N/a	—	11	4	—N/a	—
2001	36	—N/a	8	11	—	CNX^{[a]}	—	—
2003	38	—N/a	—	DNS	8	13	—	5

a. ^{1} Cancelled due to extremely cold weather.

=== World Cup ===
==== Season standings ====
Season	Age	Discipline standings					Ski Tour standings
Season	Age	Overall	Distance	Long Distance	Middle Distance	Sprint	Tour de Ski
1986	21	20	—N/a	—N/a	—N/a	—N/a	—N/a
1987	22	27	—N/a	—N/a	—N/a	—N/a	—N/a
1988	23	9	—N/a	—N/a	—N/a	—N/a	—N/a
1989	24	24	—N/a	—N/a	—N/a	—N/a	—N/a
1990	25	4	—N/a	—N/a	—N/a	—N/a	—N/a
1991	26	8	—N/a	—N/a	—N/a	—N/a	—N/a
1992	27	12	—N/a	—N/a	—N/a	—N/a	—N/a
1993	28	13	—N/a	—N/a	—N/a	—N/a	—N/a
1994	29	6	—N/a	—N/a	—N/a	—N/a	—N/a
1996	30	13	—N/a	—N/a	—N/a	—N/a	—N/a
1997	31	18	—N/a	—	—N/a	22	—N/a
1998	32	6	—N/a	—	—N/a	14	—N/a
1999	33	7	—N/a	4	—N/a	—	—N/a
2000	34	10	—N/a	8	9	15	—N/a
2001	35	16	—N/a	—N/a	—N/a	34	—N/a
2002	36	23	—N/a	—N/a	—N/a	66	—N/a
2003	37	44	—N/a	—N/a	—N/a	NC	—N/a
2004	38	44	31	—N/a	—N/a	—	—N/a
2006	40	54	40	—N/a	—N/a	58	—N/a
2007	41	107	82	—N/a	—N/a	—	—

==== Individual podiums ====
- 1 victory
- 18 podiums

No.	Season	Date	Location	Race	Level	Place
1	1987–88	27 March 1988	Rovaniemi, Finland	10 km Individual F	World Cup	3rd
2	1988–89	7 January 1989	Kavgolovo, Soviet Union	15 km Individual C	World Cup	2nd
3	1989–90	9 December 1989	Soldier Hollow, United States	5 km Individual C	World Cup	3rd
4	1989–90	15 December 1989	Thunder Bay, Canada	15 km Individual C	World Cup	3rd
5	1989–90	20 February 1990	Val di Fiemme, Italy	10 km Individual F	World Cup	3rd
6	1989–90	25 February 1990	(Socialist Federal Republic of Yugoslavia) Bohinj, Yugoslavia	10 km Individual C	World Cup	1st
7	1989–90	2 March 1990	Lahti, Finland	5 km Individual F	World Cup	2nd
8	1990–91	5 January 1991	Minsk, Soviet Union	30 km Individual C	World Cup	2nd
9	1991–92	7 December 1991	Silver Star, Canada	5 km Individual C	World Cup	3rd
10	1993–94	19 March 1994	Thunder Bay, Canada	5 km Individual C	World Cup	3rd
11	1997–98	20 December 1997	Davos, Switzerland	15 km Individual C	World Cup	2nd
12	1997–98	7 March 1998	Lahti, Finland	15 km Individual F	World Cup	3rd
13	1997–98	14 March 1998	Oslo, Norway	30 km Individual C	World Cup	2nd
14	1998–99	9 January 1999	Nové Město, Czech Republic	10 km Individual C	World Cup	3rd
15	1998–99	13 March 1999	Falun, Sweden	15 km Individual C	World Cup	2nd
16	1999–00	27 December 1999	Engelberg, Switzerland	1.0 km Sprint C	World Cup	3rd
17	1999–00	5 February 2000	Lillehammer, Norway	5 km + 5 km Skiathlon C/F	World Cup	3rd
18	2001–02	8 January 2002	Val di Fiemme, Italy	15 km Mass Start C	World Cup	3rd

==== Team podiums ====
- 13 victories
- 25 podiums

No.	Season	Date	Location	Race	Level	Place	Teammates
1	1987–88	21 February 1988	Calgary, Canada	4 × 5 km Relay F	Olympic Games^{[1]}	1st	Gavrylyuk / Tikhonova / Reztsova
2	1989–90	4 March 1990	Lahti, Finland	4 × 5 km Relay F	World Cup	2nd	Smetanina / Yegorova / Lazutina
3	1990–91	10 March 1991	Falun, Sweden	4 × 5 km Relay C	World Cup	1st	Yegorova / Tikhonova / Välbe
4	1990–91	15 March 1991	Oslo, Norway	4 × 5 km Relay C/F	World Cup	2nd	Smetanina / Tikhonova / Välbe
5	1991–92	8 March 1992	Funäsdalen, Sweden	4 × 5 km Relay C	World Cup	2nd	Välbe / Lazutina / Yegorova
6	1993–94	4 March 1994	Lahti, Finland	4 × 5 km Relay C	World Cup	2nd	Lazutina / Gavrylyuk / Välbe
7	1993–94	13 March 1994	Falun, Sweden	4 × 5 km Relay F	World Cup	1st	Gavrylyuk / Lazutina / Välbe
8	1995–96	17 December 1995	Santa Caterina, Italy	4 × 5 km Relay C	World Cup	3rd	Chepalova / Baranova-Masalkina / Zavyalova
9	1995–96	14 January 1996	Nové Město, Czech Republic	4 × 5 km Relay C	World Cup	1st	Lazutina / Gavrylyuk / Välbe
10	1995–96	17 March 1996	Oslo, Norway	4 × 5 km Relay C/F	World Cup	1st	Lazutina / Zavyalova / Gavrylyuk
11	1996–97	24 November 1996	Kiruna, Sweden	4 × 5 km Relay C	World Cup	3rd	Zavyalova / Chepalova / Danilova
12	1996–97	8 December 1996	Davos, Switzerland	4 × 5 km Relay C	World Cup	3rd	Baranova-Masalkina / Chepalova / Danilova
13	1996–97	15 December 1996	Brusson, Italy	4 × 5 km Relay F	World Cup	2nd	Zavyalova / Lazutina / Chepalova
14	1996–97	16 March 1997	Oslo, Norway	4 × 5 km Relay F	World Cup	1st	Danilova / Gavrylyuk / Välbe
15	1997–98	7 December 1997	Santa Caterina, Italy	4 × 5 km Relay F	World Cup	2nd	Baranova-Masalkina / Zavyalova / Gavrylyuk
16	1997–98	14 December 1997	Val di Fiemme, Italy	4 × 5 km Relay F	World Cup	1st	Välbe / Lazutina / Danilova
17	1997–98	6 March 1998	Lahti, Finland	4 × 5 km Relay C/F	World Cup	3rd	Baranova-Masalkina / Zavyalova / Skladneva
18	1998–99	20 December 1998	Davos, Switzerland	4 × 5 km Relay C/F	World Cup	1st	Danilova / Lazutina / Gavrylyuk
19	1998–99	10 January 1999	Nové Město, Czech Republic	4 × 5 km Relay C/F	World Cup	1st	Gavrylyuk / Reztsova / Chepalova
20	1998–99	14 March 1999	Falun, Sweden	4 × 5 km Relay C/F	World Cup	1st	Baranova-Masalkina / Chepalova / Lazutina
21	1998–99	21 March 1999	Oslo, Norway	4 × 5 km Relay C	World Cup	1st	Gavrylyuk / Chepalova / Lazutina
22	1999–00	28 November 1999	Kiruna, Sweden	4 × 5 km Relay F	World Cup	2nd	Danilova / Lazutina / Gavrylyuk
23	1999–00	19 December 1999	Davos, Switzerland	4 × 5 km Relay C	World Cup	1st	Gavrylyuk / Lazutina / Danilova
24	1999–00	13 January 2000	Nové Město, Czech Republic	4 × 5 km Relay C/F	World Cup	1st	Danilova / Yegorova / Lazutina
25	1999–00	27 February 2000	Falun, Sweden	4 × 5 km Relay F	World Cup	2nd	Yegorova / Skladneva / Gavrylyuk

Note: ^{1} Until the 1994 Olympics, Olympic races were included in the World Cup scoring system.
