= Pirkko Määttä =

Finnish cross-country skier (born 1959)

Personal information
- Full name: Pirkko Sisko Määttä
- Nationality: Finland
- Born: 7 March 1959 (age 67) Kuusamo, Finland

Sport
- Sport: Skiing
- Club: Kuusamon Erä-Veikot

World Cup career
- Seasons: 14 – (1982–1995)
- Indiv. starts: 80
- Indiv. podiums: 3
- Indiv. wins: 0
- Team starts: 22
- Team podiums: 11
- Team wins: 1
- Overall titles: 0 – (9th in 1986, 1989)
Medal record
Women's cross-country skiing
Representing Finland
Olympic Games
| Bronze medal – third place | 1984 Sarajevo | 4 × 5 km relay |
| Bronze medal – third place | 1988 Calgary | 4 × 5 km relay |
World Championships
| Gold medal – first place | 1989 Lahti | 4 × 5 km relay |
| Silver medal – second place | 1989 Lahti | 10 km classical |
| Bronze medal – third place | 1989 Lahti | 15 km classical |

Pirkko Sisko Määttä (born 7 March 1959) is a Finnish former cross-country skier who was born in Kuusamo and competed from 1982 to 1995. She won two 4 × 5 km relay bronze medals (1984, 1988) at the Winter Olympics.

Määttä won a complete set of medals at the 1989 FIS Nordic World Ski Championships with a gold in the 4 × 5 km relay, a silver in the 10 km classical, and a bronze in the 15 km. She earned her only individual victory at a 1992 event in Norway.

== Cross-country skiing results ==
All results are sourced from the International Ski Federation (FIS).

=== Olympic Games ===
- 2 medals – (2 bronze)

| Year | Age | 5 km | 10 km | 15 km | Pursuit | 20 km | 30 km | 4 × 5 km relay |
|---|---|---|---|---|---|---|---|---|
| 1984 | 24 | 10 | 19 | —N/a | —N/a | 9 | —N/a | Bronze |
| 1988 | 28 | 16 | 7 | —N/a | —N/a | — | —N/a | Bronze |
| 1992 | 32 | — | —N/a | 17 | — | —N/a | — | 4 |
| 1994 | 34 | 9 | —N/a | — | 15 | —N/a | 14 | 4 |

=== World Championships ===
- 3 medals – (1 gold, 1 silver, 1 bronze)

| Year | Age | 5 km | 10 km classical | 10 km freestyle | 15 km | Pursuit | 20 km | 30 km | 4 × 5 km relay |
|---|---|---|---|---|---|---|---|---|---|
| 1982 | 22 | — | 29 | —N/a | —N/a | —N/a | — | —N/a | 4 |
| 1985 | 25 | 23 | 37 | —N/a | —N/a | —N/a | 28 | —N/a | 4 |
| 1987 | 27 | 9 | 8 | —N/a | —N/a | —N/a | 17 | —N/a | 6 |
| 1989 | 29 | —N/a | Silver | — | Bronze | —N/a | —N/a | 21 | Gold |
| 1991 | 31 | 24 | —N/a | — | 5 | —N/a | —N/a | — | 4 |
| 1993 | 33 | 6 | —N/a | —N/a | 7 | 15 | —N/a | 15 | 4 |
| 1995 | 35 | 12 | —N/a | —N/a | 8 | 30 | —N/a | — | 6 |

=== World Cup ===
==== Season standings ====
| Season | Age | Overall |
|---|---|---|
| 1982 | 22 | 66 |
| 1983 | 23 | 22 |
| 1984 | 24 | 17 |
| 1985 | 25 | 38 |
| 1986 | 26 | 9 |
| 1987 | 27 | 12 |
| 1988 | 28 | 11 |
| 1989 | 29 | 9 |
| 1990 | 30 | 20 |
| 1991 | 31 | 16 |
| 1992 | 32 | 32 |
| 1993 | 33 | 14 |
| 1994 | 34 | 19 |
| 1995 | 35 | 18 |

==== Individual podiums ====
- 3 podiums

| No. | Season | Date | Location | Race | Level | Place |
|---|---|---|---|---|---|---|
| 1 | 1988–89 | 17 December 1988 | Davos, Switzerland | 10 km Individual C | World Cup | 2nd |
| 2 | 1988–89 | 17 February 1989 | Lahti, Finland | 10 km Individual C | World Championships^{[1]} | 2nd |
| 3 | 1988–89 | 21 February 1989 | Lahti, Finland | 15 km Individual C | World Championships^{[1]} | 3rd |

==== Team podiums ====
- 1 victory
- 11 podiums

| No. | Season | Date | Location | Race | Level | Place | Teammates |
|---|---|---|---|---|---|---|---|
| 1 | 1983–84 | 15 February 1984 | (Socialist Federal Republic of Yugoslavia) Sarajevo, Yugoslavia | 4 × 5 km Relay | Olympic Games^{[1]} | 3rd | Hyytiäinen / Matikainen / Hämäläinen |
| 2 | 1983–84 | 26 February 1984 | Falun, Sweden | 4 × 5 km Relay | World Cup | 2nd | Hyytiäinen / Savolainen / Hämäläinen |
| 3 | 1984–85 | 10 March 1985 | Falun, Sweden | 4 × 5 km Relay | World Cup | 3rd | Hyytiäinen / Matikainen / Kirvesniemi |
| 4 | 1985–86 | 10 March 1985 | Lahti, Finland | 4 × 5 km Relay C | World Cup | 3rd | Hyytiäinen / Savolainen / Matikainen |
| 5 | 1986–87 | 1 March 1987 | Lahti, Finland | 4 × 5 km Relay C/F | World Cup | 3rd | Pyykkönen / Savolainen / Matikainen |
| 6 | 1986–87 | 19 March 1987 | Oslo, Norway | 4 × 5 km Relay C | World Cup | 2nd | Hyytiäinen / Matikainen / Pyykkönen |
| 7 | 1987–88 | 21 February 1988 | Calgary, Canada | 4 × 5 km Relay F | Olympic Games^{[1]} | 3rd | Kirvesniemi / Matikainen / Savolainen |
| 8 | 1987–88 | 13 March 1988 | Falun, Sweden | 4 × 5 km Relay C | World Cup | 2nd | Kirvesniemi / Matikainen / Hyytiäinen |
| 9 | 1988–89 | 23 February 1989 | Lahti, Finland | 4 × 5 km Relay C/F | World Championships^{[1]} | 1st | Kirvesniemi / Savolainen / Matikainen |
| 10 | 1989–90 | 4 March 1990 | Lahti, Finland | 4 × 5 km Relay F | World Cup | 3rd | Kuivalainen / Hyytiäinen / Pyykkönen |
| 11 | 1989–90 | 11 March 1990 | Örnsköldsvik, Sweden | 4 × 5 km Relay C/F | World Cup | 3rd | Pyykkönen / Kuivalainen / Savolainen |

Note: ^{1} Until the 1999 World Championships and the 1994 Olympics, World Championship and Olympic races were included in the World Cup scoring system.
