= Bernd Blechschmidt =

East German Nordic combined skier

Medal record

Men's Nordic combined

World Championships
Bronze medal – third place	1989 Lahti	3 x 10 km team

Bernd Blechschmidt is a former East German Nordic combined skier who competed during the 1980s. He won a bronze medal in the 3 x 10 km team event at the 1989 FIS Nordic World Ski Championships in Lahti.

Blechschmidt's only individual career victory was in West Germany in 1981.
