= Tamara Tikhonova =

Russian Olympic cross-country skier (born 1964)

Personal information
- Nationality: Soviet Union
- Born: 13 June 1964 (age 62) Kovalyovo, Kezsky District, Udmurt ASSR, Soviet Union

Sport
- Sport: Skiing

World Cup career
- Seasons: 8 – (1984–1986, 1988–1992)
- Indiv. starts: 42
- Indiv. podiums: 10
- Indiv. wins: 2
- Team starts: 9
- Team podiums: 8
- Team wins: 5
- Overall titles: 0 – (3rd in 1989)
Medal record
Women's cross-country skiing
Representing Soviet Union
Olympic Games
| Gold medal – first place | 1988 Calgary | 20 km freestyle |
| Gold medal – first place | 1988 Calgary | 4 × 5 km relay |
| Silver medal – second place | 1988 Calgary | 5 km classical |
World Championships
| Gold medal – first place | 1985 Seefeld | 4 × 5 km relay |
| Gold medal – first place | 1991 Val di Fiemme | 4 × 5 km relay |
| Silver medal – second place | 1989 Lahti | 4 × 5 km relay |
| Bronze medal – third place | 1989 Lahti | 10 km freestyle |
| Bronze medal – third place | 1991 Val di Fiemme | 10 km freestyle |
Junior World Championships
| Silver medal – second place | 1984 Trondheim | 3 × 5 km relay |
| Bronze medal – third place | 1984 Trondheim | 5 km |

Tamara Ivanovna Tikhonova (Russian: Тамара Ивановна Тихонова; born 13 June 1964) is a Soviet-Russian former cross-country skier who competed from 1984 to 1992. She represented the Soviet Union at the 1988 Winter Olympics in Calgary, where she won three medals with golds in the 20 km freestyle and the 4 × 5 km relay, and a silver in the 5 km classical.

Tikhonova also won five medals for the Soviet Union at the FIS Nordic World Ski Championships with two golds (4 × 5 km relay: 1985, 1991), one silver (4 × 5 km relay: 1989), and two bronzes (10 km freestyle: 1989, 1991).

She was awarded Order of the Red Banner of Labour.

== Cross-country skiing results ==
All results are sourced from the International Ski Federation (FIS).

=== Olympic Games ===
- 3 medals – (2 gold, 1 silver)

| Year | Age | 5 km | 10 km | 20 km | 4 × 5 km relay |
|---|---|---|---|---|---|
| 1988 | 23 | 2nd | 5 | 1st | 1st |

=== World Championships ===
- 5 medals – (2 gold, 1 silver, 2 bronze)

| Year | Age | 5 km | 10 km classical | 10 km freestyle | 15 km | 20 km | 30 km | 4 × 5 km relay |
|---|---|---|---|---|---|---|---|---|
| 1985 | 20 | — | — | —N/a | —N/a | — | —N/a | 1st |
| 1989 | 24 | —N/a | — | 3rd | — | —N/a | 11 | 2nd |
| 1991 | 26 | — | —N/a | 3rd | — | —N/a | 11 | 1st |

=== World Cup ===
Season standings
| Season | Age | Overall |
|---|---|---|
| 1984 | 19 | 66 |
| 1985 | 20 | 15 |
| 1986 | 21 | 23 |
| 1988 | 23 | 4 |
| 1989 | 24 | 3rd place, bronze medalist(s) |
| 1990 | 25 | 7 |
| 1991 | 26 | 7 |
| 1992 | 27 | 26 |

==== Individual podiums ====
- 2 victories
- 10 podiums

| No. | Season | Date | Location | Race | Level | Place |
|---|---|---|---|---|---|---|
| 1 | 1987–88 | 16 December 1987 | (Socialist Federal Republic of Yugoslavia) Bohinj, Yugoslavia | 10 km Individual F | World Cup | 1st |
| 2 | 1987–88 | 17 February 1988 | Calgary, Canada | 5 km Individual C | Olympic Games (Note: Until the 1999 World Championships and the 1994 Olympics, World Championship and Olympic races were included in the World Cup scoring system.) | 2nd |
| 3 | 1987–88 | 25 February 1988 | Calgary, Canada | 20 km Individual F | Olympic Games | 1st |
| 4 | 1988–89 | 10 December 1988 | La Féclaz, France | 5 km Individual F | World Cup | 2nd |
| 5 | 1988–89 | 19 February 1989 | Lahti, Finland | 10 km Individual F | World Championships | 3rd |
| 6 | 1988–89 | 4 March 1989 | Oslo, Norway | 10 km + 10 km Pursuit C/F | World Cup | 2nd |
| 7 | 1988–89 | 11 March 1989 | Falun, Sweden | 15 km Individual F | World Cup | 2nd |
| 8 | 1990–91 | 8 December 1990 | Tauplitzalm, Austria | 10 km + 15 Pursuit C/F | World Cup | 3rd |
| 9 | 1990–91 | 10 February 1991 | Val di Fiemme, Italy | 10 km Individual F | World Championships | 3rd |
| 10 | 1990–91 | 9 March 1991 | Falun, Sweden | 15 km Individual F | World Cup | 2nd |

==== Team podiums ====
- 5 victories
- 8 podiums

| No. | Season | Date | Location | Race | Level | Place | Teammates |
|---|---|---|---|---|---|---|---|
| 1 | 1984–85 | 22 January 1985 | Seefeld, Austria | 4 × 5 km Relay | World Championships (Note: Until the 1999 World Championships and the 1994 Olympics, World Championship and Olympic races were included in the World Cup scoring system.) | 1st | Smetanina / Vasilchenko / Reztsova |
| 2 | 1987–88 | 21 February 1988 | Calgary, Canada | 4 × 5 km Relay F | Olympic Games | 1st | Nageykina / Gavrylyuk / Reztsova |
| 3 | 1988–89 | 22 February 1989 | Lahti, Finland | 4 × 5 km Relay C/F | World Championships | 2nd | Shamshurina / Smetanina / Välbe |
| 4 | 1988–89 | 12 March 1989 | Falun, Sweden | 4 × 5 km Relay C | World Cup | 2nd | Lazutina / Smetanina / Välbe |
| 5 | 1989–90 | 11 March 1990 | Örnsköldsvik, Sweden | 4 × 5 km Relay C/F | World Cup | 1st | Yegorova / Lazutina / Välbe |
| 6 | 1990–91 | 15 February 1991 | Val di Fiemme, Italy | 4 × 5 km Relay C/F | World Championships | 1st | Yegorova / Smetanina / Välbe |
| 7 | 1990–91 | 10 March 1991 | Falun, Sweden | 4 × 5 km Relay C | World Cup | 1st | Nageykina / Yegorova / Välbe |
| 8 | 1990–91 | 15 March 1991 | Oslo, Norway | 4 × 5 km Relay C/F | World Cup | 2nd | Nageykina / Smetanina / Välbe |
