= FIS Nordic World Ski Championships 1989 =

International Nordic skiing competition

- Host city: Lahti
- Country: Finland
- Events: 15
- Opening: 17 February 1989
- Closing: 26 February 1989
- Main venue: Salpausselkä

Official poster for the FIS Nordic World Ski Championships 1989.

The FIS Nordic World Ski Championships 1989 took place 17–26 February 1989 in Lahti, Finland, for a record fifth time (1926, 1938, 1958, 1978). The women's 5 km was not held after being reintroduced in the previous championships. These championships featured separate races of men's 15 km and women's 10 km both in the classical technique and in the freestyle technique. Additionally, the women's 15 km event debuted and the women's 20 km event was lengthened to 30 km.

== Men's cross-country ==
=== 15 km classical ===
22 February 1989

Medal	Athlete	Time
Gold	Harri Kirvesniemi (FIN)	42:40.7
Silver	Pål Gunnar Mikkelsplass (NOR)	42:44.0
Bronze	Vegard Ulvang (NOR)	43:08.4

=== 15 km freestyle ===
20 February 1989

Medal	Athlete	Time
Gold	Gunde Svan (SWE)	40:39.6
Silver	Torgny Mogren (SWE)	41:02.9
Bronze	Lars Håland (SWE)	41:10.3

=== 30 km classical ===
18 February 1989

Medal	Athlete	Time
Gold	Vladimir Smirnov (URS)	1:24:56.9
Silver	Vegard Ulvang (NOR)	1:25:03,6
Bronze	Christer Majbäck (SWE)	1:25:09,8

=== 50 km freestyle ===
26 February 1989

Medal	Athlete	Time
Gold	Gunde Svan (SWE)	2:15:24.9
Silver	Torgny Mogren (SWE)	2:16:09.2
Bronze	Alexey Prokurorov (URS)	2:16:18.8

=== 4 × 10 km relay ===
24 February 1989

Medal	Team	Time
Gold	Sweden (Christer Majbäck, Gunde Svan, Lars Håland, Torgny Mogren)	1:40:12.3
Silver	Finland (Aki Karvonen, Harri Kirvesniemi, Kari Ristanen, Jari Räsänen)	1:40:13.6
Bronze	Czechoslovakia (Ladislav Švanda, Martin Petrásek, Radim Nyč, Václav Korunka)	1:40:13.7

Among the 19 relay teams competing were Australia, Denmark, Greece, and the Netherlands.

== Women's cross-country ==
=== 10 km classical ===
17 February 1989

Medal	Athlete	Time
Gold	Marja-Liisa Kirvesniemi (FIN)	29:19.0
Silver	Pirkko Määttä (FIN)	30:12.2
Bronze	Marjo Matikainen (FIN)	30:12.9

=== 10 km freestyle ===
19 February 1989

Medal	Athlete	Time
Gold	Yelena Välbe (URS)	27:04.5
Silver	Marjo Matikainen (FIN)	27:36.7
Bronze	Tamara Tikhonova (URS)	27:58.8

=== 15 km classical ===
21 February 1989

Medal	Athlete	Time
Gold	Marjo Matikainen (FIN)	47:46.6
Silver	Marja-Liisa Kirvesniemi (FIN)	47:48.6
Bronze	Pirkko Määttä (FIN)	48:20.8

=== 30 km freestyle ===
25 February 1989

Medal	Athlete	Time
Gold	Yelena Välbe (URS)	1:29:59.7
Silver	Larisa Lazutina (URS)	1:30:07.7
Bronze	Marjo Matikainen (FIN)	1:30:30.6

=== 4 × 5 km relay ===
24 February 1989

Medal	Team	Time
Gold	Finland (Pirkko Määttä, Marja-Liisa Kirvesniemi, Jaana Savolainen, Marjo Matikainen)	54:49.8
Silver	Soviet Union (Yuliya Shamshurina, Raisa Smetanina, Tamara Tikhonova, Yelena Välbe)	54:56.9
Bronze	Norway (Inger Helene Nybråten, Anne Jahren, Nina Skeime, Marianne Dahlmo)	55:52.3

== Men's Nordic combined ==
=== 15 km individual Gundersen ===
18/19 February 1989

Medal	Athlete	Time
Gold	Trond Einar Elden (NOR)	37.10.7
Silver	Andrey Dundukov (URS)	+ 2.39.9
Bronze	Trond-Arne Bredesen (NOR)	+ 3.04.3

=== 3 × 10 km team ===
23/24 February 1989

Medal	Team	Time
Gold	Norway (Trond Einar Elden, Trond-Arne Bredesen, Bård Jørgen Elden)	1:24.21.7
Silver	Switzerland (Andreas Schaad, Hippolyt Kempf, Fredy Glanzmann)	+ 1.44.3
Bronze	East Germany (Ralph Leonhardt, Bernd Blechschmidt, Thomas Abratis)	+ 1.48.4

== Men's ski jumping ==
=== Individual normal hill ===
26 February 1989

Medal	Athlete	Points
Gold	Jens Weißflog (GDR)	114.5
Silver	Ari-Pekka Nikkola (FIN)	110.5
Bronze	Heinz Kuttin (AUT)	108.5

The event was originally scheduled for 25 February, however, due to adverse weather conditions it was postponed to the following day. Due to strong winds no second round took place and results were taken from the first round.

=== Individual large hill ===
20 February 1989

Medal	Athlete	Points
Gold	Jari Puikkonen (FIN)	218.5
Silver	Jens Weißflog (GDR)	212.5
Bronze	Matti Nykänen (FIN)	205.0

=== Team large hill ===
22 February 1989

Medal	Team	Points
Gold	Finland (Ari-Pekka Nikkola, Jari Puikkonen, Matti Nykänen, Risto Laakkonen)	645.0
Silver	Norway (Magne Johansen, Clas Brede Bråthen, Ole Gunnar Fidjestøl, Jon Inge Kjørum)	626.0
Bronze	Czechoslovakia (Jiří Parma, Martin Švagerko, Ladislav Dluhoš, Pavel Ploc)	595.5

== Medal table ==
Medal winners by nation.

* Host nation (Finland)

Rank	Nation	Gold	Silver	Bronze	Total
1	Finland (FIN)*	6	5	4	15
2	Soviet Union (URS)	3	3	2	8
3	Sweden (SWE)	3	2	2	7
4	Norway (NOR)	2	3	3	8
5	East Germany (GDR)	1	1	1	3
6	Switzerland (SUI)	0	1	0	1
7	Czechoslovakia (TCH)	0	0	2	2
8	Austria (AUT)	0	0	1	1
Totals (8 entries)		15	15	15	45
