= United States at the 2020 Summer Olympics =

- Flag of the United States
- IOC code: USA
- NOC: United States Olympic & Paralympic Committee
- Website: www.teamusa.org

in Tokyo, Japan July 23, 2021 – August 8, 2021
- Competitors: 615 (285 men and 330 women) in 35 sports
- Flag bearers (opening): Eddy Alvarez; Sue Bird
- Flag bearer (closing): Kara Winger
- Medals Ranked 1st: Gold 39 Silver 41 Bronze 33 Total 113

Summer Olympics appearances (overview)
- 1896; 1900; 1904; 1908; 1912; 1920; 1924; 1928; 1932; 1936; 1948; 1952; 1956; 1960; 1964; 1968; 1972; 1976; 1980; 1984; 1988; 1992; 1996; 2000; 2004; 2008; 2012; 2016; 2020; 2024; 2028

Other related appearances
- 1906 Intercalated Games

The United States of America (USA), represented by the United States Olympic & Paralympic Committee (USOPC), competed at the 2020 Summer Olympics in Tokyo. Originally scheduled to take place from 24 July 2020 to 9 August 2020, the Games were postponed to July 23 to August 8, 2021, due to the COVID-19 pandemic. U.S. athletes have appeared in every Summer Olympic Games of the modern era, with the exception of the 1980 Summer Olympics in Moscow, which the U.S. boycotted in protest of the Soviet invasion of Afghanistan. The opening ceremony flag-bearers for the United States were baseball player Eddy Alvarez and basketball player Sue Bird. Javelin thrower Kara Winger was the flag-bearer for the closing ceremony. For the third consecutive time in the Summer Olympics, the United States was represented by more female than male athletes (285 men and 330 women).

The country finished the Games with 113 medals, the most amongst all nations: 39 gold, 41 silver, and 33 bronze. These individual totals were each the highest of the Games, after a final-day tally of three gold medals (women's basketball, women's omnium, and women's volleyball) surpassed China's total of 38 golds. Overall, the medal total was slightly lower than five years prior in Rio de Janeiro, where the United States won 46 gold and 121 total medals.

As Los Angeles will be the host city of the 2028 Summer Olympics, the United States, along with France, which is hosting the 2024 Summer Olympics in Paris, marched in the opening ceremony just before the host nation Japan.

== Medalists ==
The following U.S. competitors won medals at the games. In the discipline sections below, the medalists' names are bolded.

Medal	Name	Sport	Event	Date
Gold	Lee Kiefer	Fencing	Women's foil	July 25
Gold	Will Shaner	Shooting	Men's 10 m air rifle	July 25
Gold	Chase Kalisz	Swimming	Men's 400 m individual medley	July 25
Gold	Anastasija Zolotic	Taekwondo	Women's −57 kg	July 25
Gold	Zach Apple; Bowe Becker; Brooks Curry^{[a]} Caeleb Dressel; Blake Pieroni	Swimming	Men's 4 × 100 m freestyle relay	July 26
Gold	Vincent Hancock	Shooting	Men's skeet	July 26
Gold	Amber English	Shooting	Women's skeet	July 26
Gold	Carissa Moore	Surfing	Women's shortboard	July 27
Gold	Lydia Jacoby	Swimming	Women's 100 m breaststroke	July 27
Gold	United States women's national 3x3 team: Stefanie Dolson; Allisha Gray; Kelsey Plum; Jackie Young	Basketball	Women's 3x3 tournament	July 28
Gold	Katie Ledecky	Swimming	Women's 1500 m freestyle	July 28
Gold	Sunisa Lee	Gymnastics	Women's artistic individual all-around	July 29
Gold	Caeleb Dressel	Swimming	Men's 100 m freestyle	July 29
Gold	Bobby Finke	Swimming	Men's 800 m freestyle	July 29
Gold	Caeleb Dressel	Swimming	Men's 100 m butterfly	July 31
Gold	Katie Ledecky	Swimming	Women's 800 m freestyle	July 31
Gold	Xander Schauffele	Golf	Men's	August 1
Gold	Caeleb Dressel	Swimming	Men's 50 m freestyle	August 1
Gold	Bobby Finke	Swimming	Men's 1500 m freestyle	August 1
Gold	Michael Andrew; Zach Apple; Hunter Armstrong^{[a]} Caeleb Dressel; Ryan Murphy; Blake Pieroni^{[a]} Tom Shields^{[a]} Andrew Wilson^{[a]}	Swimming	Men's 4 × 100 m medley relay	August 1
Gold	Valarie Allman	Athletics	Women's discus throw	August 2
Gold	Jade Carey	Gymnastics	Women's floor	August 2
Gold	Athing Mu	Athletics	Women's 800 m	August 3
Gold	Tamyra Mensah Stock	Wrestling	Women's freestyle 68 kg	August 3
Gold	Sydney McLaughlin	Athletics	Women's 400 m hurdles	August 4
Gold	Ryan Crouser	Athletics	Men's shot put	August 5
Gold	Katie Nageotte	Athletics	Women's pole vault	August 5
Gold	Nevin Harrison	Canoeing	Women's C-1 200 m	August 5
Gold	David Taylor	Wrestling	Men's freestyle 86 kg	August 5
Gold	April Ross; Alix Klineman	Volleyball	Women's beach volleyball tournament	August 6
Gold	Gable Steveson	Wrestling	Men's freestyle 125 kg	August 6
Gold	Rai Benjamin; Michael Cherry; Bryce Deadmon; Michael Norman; Vernon Norwood^{[a]} Randolph Ross^{[a]} Trevor Stewart^{[a]}	Athletics	Men's 4 × 400 m relay	August 7
Gold	Kendall Ellis^{[a]} Allyson Felix; Lynna Irby^{[a]} Wadeline Jonathas^{[a]} Sydney McLaughlin; Athing Mu; Dalilah Muhammad; Kaylin Whitney^{[a]}	Athletics	Women's 4 × 400 m relay	August 7
Gold	United States men's national basketball team: Bam Adebayo; Devin Booker; Kevin Durant; Jerami Grant; Draymond Green; Jrue Holiday; Keldon Johnson; Zach LaVine; Damian Lillard; JaVale McGee; Khris Middleton; Jayson Tatum	Basketball	Men's 5x5 tournament	August 7
Gold	Nelly Korda	Golf	Women's	August 7
Gold	United States women's national water polo team: Ashleigh Johnson (gk); Maddie Musselman; Melissa Seidemann; Rachel Fattal; Paige Hauschild; Maggie Steffens (c); Stephania Haralabidis; Jamie Neushul; Aria Fischer; Kaleigh Gilchrist; Makenzie Fischer; Alys Williams; Amanda Longan (gk)	Water polo	Women's tournament	August 7
Gold	United States women's national basketball team: Ariel Atkins; Sue Bird; Tina Charles; Napheesa Collier; Skylar Diggins-Smith; Sylvia Fowles; Chelsea Gray; Brittney Griner; Jewell Loyd; Breanna Stewart; Diana Taurasi; A'ja Wilson	Basketball	Women's 5x5 tournament	August 8
Gold	Jennifer Valente	Cycling	Women's omnium	August 8
Gold	United States women's national volleyball team: Micha Hancock; Jordyn Poulter; Justine Wong-Orantes (L); Jordan Larson (c); Annie Drews; Jordan Thompson; Michelle Bartsch-Hackley; Kimberly Hill; Foluke Akinradewo; Haleigh Washington; Kelsey Robinson; Chiaka Ogbogu	Volleyball	Women's tournament	August 8
Silver	Jay Litherland	Swimming	Men's 400 m individual medley	July 25
Silver	Emma Weyant	Swimming	Women's 400 m individual medley	July 25
Silver	Katie Ledecky	Swimming	Women's 400 m freestyle	July 26
Silver	Jessica Parratto; Delaney Schnell	Diving	Women's synchronized 10 m platform	July 27
Silver	Adrienne Lyle; Steffen Peters; Sabine Schut-Kery	Equestrian	Team dressage	July 27
Silver	Simone Biles; Jordan Chiles; Sunisa Lee; Grace McCallum	Gymnastics	Women's artistic team all-around	July 27
Silver	Lucas Kozeniesky; Mary Tucker	Shooting	Mixed 10 m air rifle	July 27
Silver	United States women's national softball team: Monica Abbott; Ali Aguilar; Valerie Arioto; Ally Carda; Amanda Chidester; Rachel Garcia; Haylie McCleney; Aubree Munro; Michelle Moultrie; Dejah Mulipolah; Bubba Nickles; Cat Osterman; Delaney Spaulding; Kelsey Stewart; Janie Reed	Softball	Women's tournament	July 27
Silver	Andrew Capobianco; Michael Hixon	Diving	Men's synchronized 3 m springboard	July 28
Silver	Erica Sullivan	Swimming	Women's 1500 m freestyle	July 28
Silver	Alex Walsh	Swimming	Women's 200 m individual medley	July 28
Silver	Kayle Browning	Shooting	Women's trap	July 29
Silver	Regan Smith	Swimming	Women's 200 m butterfly	July 29
Silver	Brooke Forde^{[a]} Paige Madden; Katie McLaughlin; Katie Ledecky; Allison Schmitt; Bella Sims^{[a]}	Swimming	Women's 4 × 200 m freestyle relay	July 29
Silver	Ryan Murphy	Swimming	Men's 200 m backstroke	July 30
Silver	Lilly King	Swimming	Women's 200 m breaststroke	July 30
Silver	Taylor Knibb; Kevin McDowell; Morgan Pearson; Katie Zaferes	Triathlon	Mixed relay	July 31
Silver	Fred Kerley	Athletics	Men's 100 m	August 1
Silver	Raven Saunders	Athletics	Women's shot put	August 1
Silver	Hannah Roberts	Cycling	Women's BMX freestyle	August 1
Silver	MyKayla Skinner	Gymnastics	Women's vault	August 1
Silver	Erika Brown^{[a]} Claire Curzan^{[a]} Torri Huske; Lydia Jacoby; Lilly King^{[a]} Regan Smith; Abbey Weitzeil; Rhyan White^{[a]}	Swimming	Women's 4 × 100 m medley relay	August 1
Silver	Katherine Nye	Weightlifting	Women's −76 kg	August 1
Silver	Kendra Harrison	Athletics	Women's 100 m hurdles	August 2
Silver	Adeline Gray	Wrestling	Women's freestyle 76 kg	August 2
Silver	Rai Benjamin	Athletics	Men's 400 m hurdles	August 3
Silver	Chris Nilsen	Athletics	Men's pole vault	August 3
Silver	Brittney Reese	Athletics	Women's long jump	August 3
Silver	Kenny Bednarek	Athletics	Men's 200 m	August 4
Silver	Dalilah Muhammad	Athletics	Women's 400 m hurdles	August 4
Silver	Courtney Frerichs	Athletics	Women's 3000 m steeplechase	August 4
Silver	Grant Holloway	Athletics	Men's 110 m hurdles	August 5
Silver	Joe Kovacs	Athletics	Men's shot put	August 5
Silver	Duke Ragan	Boxing	Men's featherweight	August 5
Silver	Nathaniel Coleman	Sport climbing	Men's combined	August 5
Silver	Teahna Daniels; English Gardner^{[a]} Aleia Hobbs^{[a]} Javianne Oliver; Jenna Prandini; Gabrielle Thomas	Athletics	Women's 4 × 100 metres relay	August 6
Silver	United States men's national baseball team: Nick Allen; Eddy Alvarez; Tyler Austin; Shane Baz; Triston Casas; Anthony Carter; Brandon Dickson; Tim Federowicz; Eric Filia; Todd Frazier; Anthony Gose; Edwin Jackson; Scott Kazmir; Patrick Kivlehan; Mark Kolozsvary; Jack López; Nick Martinez; Scott McGough; David Robertson; Joe Ryan; Ryder Ryan; Simeon Woods Richardson; Bubba Starling; Jamie Westbrook	Baseball	Men's tournament	August 7
Silver	Laura Kraut; Jessica Springsteen; McLain Ward	Equestrian	Team jumping	August 7
Silver	Kyle Snyder	Wrestling	Men's freestyle 97 kg	August 7
Silver	Keyshawn Davis	Boxing	Men's lightweight	August 8
Silver	Richard Torrez	Boxing	Men's super heavyweight	August 8
Bronze	Jagger Eaton	Skateboarding	Men's street	July 25
Bronze	Kieran Smith	Swimming	Men's 400 m freestyle	July 25
Bronze	Hali Flickinger	Swimming	Women's 400 m individual medley	July 25
Bronze	Erika Brown; Catie DeLoof^{[a]} Natalie Hinds; Simone Manuel; Allison Schmitt^{[a]} Olivia Smoliga^{[a]} Abbey Weitzeil	Swimming	Women's 4 × 100 m freestyle relay	July 25
Bronze	Ryan Murphy	Swimming	Men's 100 m backstroke	July 27
Bronze	Regan Smith	Swimming	Women's 100 m backstroke	July 27
Bronze	Lilly King	Swimming	Women's 100 m breaststroke	July 27
Bronze	Katie Zaferes	Triathlon	Women's	July 27
Bronze	Kate Douglass	Swimming	Women's 200 m individual medley	July 28
Bronze	Hali Flickinger	Swimming	Women's 200 m butterfly	July 29
Bronze	Annie Lazor	Swimming	Women's 200 m breaststroke	July 30
Bronze	Bryce Deadmon^{[a]} Kendall Ellis; Elija Godwin^{[a]} Lynna Irby^{[a]} Taylor Manson^{[a]} Vernon Norwood; Trevor Stewart; Kaylin Whitney	Athletics	Mixed 4 × 400 m relay	July 31
Bronze	Brian Burrows; Madelynn Bernau	Shooting	Mixed trap team	July 31
Bronze	Krysta Palmer	Diving	Women's 3 m springboard	August 1
Bronze	Race Imboden; Nick Itkin; Alexander Massialas; Gerek Meinhardt	Fencing	Men's team foil	August 1
Bronze	Sunisa Lee	Gymnastics	Women's uneven bars	August 1
Bronze	Sarah Robles	Weightlifting	Women's +87 kg	August 2
Bronze	Gabrielle Thomas	Athletics	Women's 200 m	August 3
Bronze	Raevyn Rogers	Athletics	Women's 800 m	August 3
Bronze	Chloé Dygert; Megan Jastrab; Emma White; Lily Williams^{[a]}	Cycling	Women's team pursuit	August 3
Bronze	Simone Biles	Gymnastics	Women's balance beam	August 3
Bronze	Noah Lyles	Athletics	Men's 200 m	August 4
Bronze	Oshae Jones	Boxing	Women's welterweight	August 4
Bronze	United States women's national soccer team: Jane Campbell; Abby Dahlkemper; Tierna Davidson; Crystal Dunn; Julie Ertz; Adrianna Franch; Tobin Heath; Lindsey Horan; Casey Krueger; Rose Lavelle; Carli Lloyd; Catarina Macario; Kristie Mewis; Sam Mewis; Alex Morgan; Alyssa Naeher; Kelley O'Hara; Christen Press; Megan Rapinoe; Becky Sauerbrunn (c); Emily Sonnett; Lynn Williams	Football	Women's tournament	August 5
Bronze	Cory Juneau	Skateboarding	Men's park	August 5
Bronze	Thomas Gilman	Wrestling	Men's freestyle 57 kg	August 5
Bronze	Helen Maroulis	Wrestling	Women's freestyle 57 kg	August 5
Bronze	Paul Chelimo	Athletics	Men's 5000 m	August 6
Bronze	Allyson Felix	Athletics	Women's 400 m	August 6
Bronze	Ariel Torres	Karate	Men's kata	August 6
Bronze	Kyle Dake	Wrestling	Men's freestyle 74 kg	August 6
Bronze	Molly Seidel	Athletics	Women's marathon	August 7
Bronze	Sarah Hildebrandt	Wrestling	Women's freestyle 50 kg	August 7

Medals by sport
Sport	1st place, gold medalist(s)	2nd place, silver medalist(s)	3rd place, bronze medalist(s)	Total
Swimming	11	10	9	**30**
Athletics	7	12	7	**26**
Wrestling	3	2	4	**9**
Shooting	3	2	1	**6**
Basketball	3	0	0	**3**
Gymnastics	2	2	2	**6**
Golf	2	0	0	**2**
Volleyball	2	0	0	**2**
Cycling	1	1	1	**3**
Fencing	1	0	1	**2**
Canoeing	1	0	0	**1**
Surfing	1	0	0	**1**
Taekwondo	1	0	0	**1**
Water polo	1	0	0	**1**
Boxing	0	3	1	**4**
Diving	0	2	1	**3**
Equestrian	0	2	0	**2**
Triathlon	0	1	1	**2**
Weightlifting	0	1	1	**2**
Baseball	0	1	0	**1**
Softball	0	1	0	**1**
Sport climbing	0	1	0	**1**
Skateboarding	0	0	2	**2**
Football	0	0	1	**1**
Karate	0	0	1	**1**
Total	39	41	33	113

Medals by day
Day	Date	1st place, gold medalist(s)	2nd place, silver medalist(s)	3rd place, bronze medalist(s)	Total
1	July 24	0	0	0	**0**
2	July 25	4	2	4	**10**
3	July 26	3	1	0	**4**
4	July 27	2	5	4	**11**
5	July 28	2	3	1	**6**
6	July 29	3	3	1	**7**
7	July 30	0	2	1	**3**
8	July 31	2	1	2	**5**
9	August 1	4	6	3	**13**
10	August 2	2	2	1	**5**
11	August 3	2	3	4	**9**
12	August 4	1	3	2	**6**
13	August 5	4	4	4	**12**
14	August 6	2	1	4	**7**
15	August 7	5	3	2	**10**
16	August 8	3	2	0	**5**
Total		39	41	33	113

Medals by gender
Gender	1st place, gold medalist(s)	2nd place, silver medalist(s)	3rd place, bronze medalist(s)	Total	Percentage
Female	23	22	21	**66**	58.4%
Male	16	15	10	**41**	36.3%
Mixed	0	4	2	**6**	5.3%
Total	39	41	33	113	100%

Multiple medalists
Name	Sport	1st place, gold medalist(s)	2nd place, silver medalist(s)	3rd place, bronze medalist(s)	Total
Caeleb Dressel	Swimming	5	0	0	**5**
Katie Ledecky	Swimming	2	2	0	**4**
Sunisa Lee	Gymnastics	1	1	1	**3**
Ryan Murphy	Swimming	1	1	1	**3**
Lilly King	Swimming	0	2	1	**3**
Regan Smith	Swimming	0	2	1	**3**
Zach Apple	Swimming	2	0	0	**2**
Bobby Finke	Swimming	2	0	0	**2**
Sydney McLaughlin	Athletics	2	0	0	**2**
Athing Mu	Athletics	2	0	0	**2**
Blake Pieroni	Swimming	2	0	0	**2**
Rai Benjamin	Athletics	1	1	0	**2**
Lydia Jacoby	Swimming	1	1	0	**2**
Dalilah Muhammad	Athletics	1	1	0	**2**
Bryce Deadmon	Athletics	1	0	1	**2**
Kendall Ellis	Athletics	1	0	1	**2**
Allyson Felix	Athletics	1	0	1	**2**
Lynna Irby	Athletics	1	0	1	**2**
Vernon Norwood	Athletics	1	0	1	**2**
Trevor Stewart	Athletics	1	0	1	**2**
Jennifer Valente	Cycling	1	0	1	**2**
Kaylin Whitney	Athletics	1	0	1	**2**
Simone Biles	Gymnastics	0	1	1	**2**
Erika Brown	Swimming	0	1	1	**2**
Allison Schmitt	Swimming	0	1	1	**2**
Gabrielle Thomas	Athletics	0	1	1	**2**
Abbey Weitzeil	Swimming	0	1	1	**2**
Katie Zaferes	Triathlon	0	1	1	**2**
Hali Flickinger	Swimming	0	0	2	**2**

^{a} Athletes who participated in the heats only.

== Competitors ==
The following is the list of number of competitors in the Games, including game-eligible alternates in team sports.

Sport	Men	Women	Total
Archery	3	3	6
Artistic swimming	—N/a	2	2
Athletics	63	65	128
Badminton	3	1	4
Baseball	24	—N/a	24
Basketball	12	16	28
Boxing	5	5	10
Canoeing	2	2	4
Cycling	9	18	27
Diving	5	6	11
Equestrian	5	4	9
Fencing	9	9	18
Football (soccer)	0	18	18
Golf	4	4	8
Gymnastics	6	14	20
Judo	1	3	4
Karate	3	1	4
Modern pentathlon	1	1	2
Rowing	13	24	37
Rugby sevens	12	12	24
Sailing	6	7	13
Shooting	11	9	20
Skateboarding	6	6	12
Softball	—N/a	15	15
Sport climbing	2	2	4
Surfing	2	2	4
Swimming	25	28	53
Table tennis	3	3	6
Tennis	6	6	12
Taekwondo	0	2	2
Triathlon	2	3	5
Volleyball	16	16	32
Water polo	13	13	26
Weightlifting	4	4	8
Wrestling	9	6	15
Total	285	330	615

== Archery ==
One U.S. archer qualified for the men's individual recurve by reaching the quarterfinal stage and obtaining one of the four available spots at the 2019 World Archery Championships in 's-Hertogenbosch, Netherlands. Another U.S. archer secured a spot in the women's individual recurve by winning the mixed team title at the 2019 Pan American Games in Lima, Peru. The athletes were selected after the Olympic Trials. Four more U.S. archers were named to the roster for Tokyo 2020 after winning their places in the men's and women's team recurve at the 2021 Final Qualification Tournament in Paris, France.

Men

Athlete	Event	Ranking round		Round of 64	Round of 32	Round of 16	Quarterfinals	Semifinals	Final / BM	
Athlete	Event	Score	Seed	Opposition Score	Opposition Score	Opposition Score	Opposition Score	Opposition Score	Opposition Score	Rank
Brady Ellison	Individual	682	2	Vaziri (IRI); W 6–0	Jadhav (IND); W 6–0	Wukie (USA); W 7–3	Gazoz (TUR); L 3–7	Did not advance		
Jack Williams	Individual	656	29	Plihon (FRA); L 4–6	Did not advance					
Jacob Wukie	Individual	649	47	Aguilar (CHI); W 7–1	Salsabilla (INA); W 6–5	Ellison (USA); L 3–7	Did not advance			
Brady Ellison; Jack Williams; Jacob Wukie	Team	1987	5	—N/a		France; W 6–0	Japan; L 1–5	Did not advance		

Women

Athlete	Event	Ranking round		Round of 64	Round of 32	Round of 16	Quarterfinals	Semifinals	Final / BM	
Athlete	Event	Score	Seed	Opposition Score	Opposition Score	Opposition Score	Opposition Score	Opposition Score	Opposition Score	Rank
Mackenzie Brown	Individual	668	5	Schwarz (GER); W 6–2	Long (CHN); W 6–0	Lin (TPE); W 6–2	Valencia (MEX); W 6–5	An (KOR); L 5–6	Boari (ITA); L 1–7	4
Casey Kaufhold	Individual	653	17	de Velasco (ESP); W 7–3	Hayakawa (JPN); L 2–6	Did not advance				
Jennifer Mucino-Fernandez	Individual	649	24	Pavlova (UKR); W 6–4	Kumari (IND); L 4–6	Did not advance				
Mackenzie Brown; Casey Kaufhold; Jennifer Mucino-Fernandez	Team	1970	3	—N/a		Bye	ROC; L 0–6	Did not advance		

Mixed

Athlete	Event	Ranking round		Round of 16	Quarterfinals	Semifinals	Final / BM	
Athlete	Event	Score	Seed	Opposition Score	Opposition Score	Opposition Score	Opposition Score	Rank
Mackenzie Brown; Brady Ellison	Team	1350	2 Q	Indonesia; L 4–5	Did not advance			

== Artistic swimming ==
The United States fielded a squad of two artistic swimmers to compete in the women's duet event, by finishing fifth at the 2021 FINA Olympic Qualification Tournament in Barcelona, Spain.

Athlete	Event	Free routine (preliminary)		Technical routine			Free routine (final)		
Athlete	Event	Points	Rank	Points	Total (technical + free)	Rank	Points	Total (technical + free)	Rank
Anita Alvarez; Lindi Schroeder	Duet	86.5333	13	86.1960	172.7293	13	Did not advance		

== Athletics (track and field) ==
U.S. athletes achieved the entry standards, either by qualifying time or by world ranking, in the following track and field events (up to a maximum of 3 athletes in each event). The team was selected based on the results of the 2020 United States Olympic Trials (June 18 to 27, 2021) held in Eugene, Oregon.

Six marathon runners (three per gender) were the first set of U.S. track and field athletes selected for the Games by virtue of their top three finish at the Olympic Team Trials in Atlanta, Georgia on February 29, 2020.

Following the completion of the Olympic Trials, 128 athletes (63 men and 65 women) were named to the U.S. track and field team for the Games, with sprinter and multiple medalist Allyson Felix and marathon runner Abdihakem Abdirahman, the oldest US Olympic runner in history (aged 44), competing at their fifth Olympics and another sprinter Erriyon Knighton establishing himself as the youngest (aged 17) in nearly six decades. Apart from Felix and Knighton, the U.S. team also featured three Olympic champions from Rio 2016, namely middle-distance runner Matthew Centrowitz, Jr. (men's 1500 m), hurdler Dalilah Muhammad, and shot put world record holder Ryan Crouser.

The fastest American woman in the 100 meters dash Sha'Carri Richardson missed the Olympics due to a positive test for marijuana, two-time pole vault world champion Sam Kendricks was out with COVID-19, 2016 110m hurdles gold medalist Brianna Rollins-McNeal was suspended for missed drug tests, and two-time defending gold medalist and 2019 world champion in triple jump Christian Taylor was out due to injury. The U.S. lost some races where it either had world champions or world record holders competing. Those included 100m specialist Trayvon Bromell, owning the fastest time in 100 meters in 2021, who was eliminated in the semifinals, 2019 world champion Noah Lyles who finished third in the 200 meters, and 2019 world champion and world record holder Grant Holloway who got silver in the 100m hurdles.

Overall, the U.S. topped the medal table in track and field events with 7 gold medals, 12 silver medals, 7 bronze medals, and 26 total medals. Sydney McLaughlin and Athing Mu both won two gold medals to lead the U.S. track and field athletes, with McLaughlin's time in the 400 m hurdles setting a new world record.

Key

- Note–Ranks given for track events are within the athlete's heat only
- Q = Qualified for the next round
- q = Qualified for the next round as a fastest loser or, in field events, by position without achieving the qualifying target
- qR = Qualified to the next round by referee judgement
- NR = National record
- N/A = Round not applicable for the event
- Bye = Athlete not required to compete in round

Track & road events
Men

Athlete	Event	Heat		Quarterfinal		Semifinal		Final	
Athlete	Event	Time	Rank	Time	Rank	Time	Rank	Time	Rank
Ronnie Baker	100 m	Bye		10.03	1 Q	9.83	2 Q	9.95	5
Trayvon Bromell	100 m	Bye		10.05	4 q	10.00	3	Did not advance	
Fred Kerley	100 m	Bye		9.97	2 Q	9.96	1 Q	9.84	2nd place, silver medalist(s)
Kenny Bednarek	200 m	20.01	1 Q	—N/a		19.83	2 Q	19.68	2nd place, silver medalist(s)
Erriyon Knighton	200 m	20.55	1 Q	—N/a		20.02	1 Q	19.93	4
Noah Lyles	200 m	20.18	1 Q	—N/a		19.99	3 q	19.74	3rd place, bronze medalist(s)
Michael Cherry	400 m	44.82	1 Q	—N/a		44.44	1 Q	44.21	4
Michael Norman	400 m	45.35	2 Q	—N/a		44.52	2 Q	44.31	5
Randolph Ross	400 m	45.67	4	—N/a		Did not advance			
Bryce Hoppel	800 m	1:45.64	3 Q	—N/a		1:44.91	5	Did not advance	
Isaiah Jewett	800 m	1:45.07	5 q	—N/a		2:38.12	7	Did not advance	
Clayton Murphy	800 m	1:45.53	1 Q	—N/a		1:44.18	2 Q	1:46.53	9
Matthew Centrowitz Jr.	1500 m	3:51.12	2 Q	—N/a		3:33.69	9	Did not advance	
Cole Hocker	1500 m	3:36.16	4 Q	—N/a		3:33.87	2 Q	3:31.40	6
Yared Nuguse	1500 m	DNS		—N/a		Did not advance			
Paul Chelimo	5000 m	13:30.15	2 Q	—N/a				12:59.05	3rd place, bronze medalist(s)
Grant Fisher	5000 m	13:31.80	8	—N/a				13:08.40	9
Woody Kincaid	5000 m	13:39.04	3 Q	—N/a				13:17.20	14
Grant Fisher	10000 m	—N/a						27:46.39	5
Woody Kincaid	10000 m	—N/a						28:11.01	15
Joe Klecker	10000 m	—N/a						28:14.18	16
Devon Allen	110 m hurdles	13.21	1 Q	—N/a		13.18	1 Q	13.14	4
Grant Holloway	110 m hurdles	13.02	1 Q	—N/a		13.13	1 Q	13.09	2nd place, silver medalist(s)
Daniel Roberts	110 m hurdles	13.41	2 Q	—N/a		13.33	5	Did not advance	
Rai Benjamin	400 m hurdles	48.60	1 Q	—N/a		47.37	2 Q	46.17 AM	2nd place, silver medalist(s)
David Kendziera	400 m hurdles	49.23	4 Q	—N/a		48.67	3	Did not advance	
Kenny Selmon	400 m hurdles	48.61	2 Q	—N/a		48.58	4	Did not advance	
Hillary Bor	3000 m steeplechase	8:19.80	6	—N/a				Did not advance	
Mason Ferlic	3000 m steeplechase	8:20.23	8	—N/a				Did not advance	
Benard Keter	3000 m steeplechase	8:17.31	6 q	—N/a				8:22.12	11
Ronnie Baker; Trayvon Bromell; Cravon Gillespie; Fred Kerley	4 × 100 m relay	38.10	6	—N/a				Did not advance	
Rai Benjamin; Michael Cherry; Bryce Deadmon; Michael Norman; Vernon Norwood^{[b]} Randolph Ross^{[b]} Trevor Stewart^{[b]}	4 × 400 m relay	2:57.77	1 Q	—N/a				2:55.70	1st place, gold medalist(s)
Abdihakem Abdirahman	Marathon	—N/a						2:18:27	41
Jacob Riley	Marathon	—N/a						2:16:26	29
Galen Rupp	Marathon	—N/a						2:11:41	8
Nick Christie	20 km walk	—N/a						1:34:37	50

Women

Athlete	Event	Heat		Quarterfinal		Semifinal		Final	
Athlete	Event	Time	Rank	Time	Rank	Time	Rank	Time	Rank
Teahna Daniels	100 m	Bye		11.04	1 Q	10.98	3 q	11.02	7
Javianne Oliver	100 m	Bye		11.15	2 Q	11.08	5	Did not advance	
Jenna Prandini	100 m	Bye		11.11	3 Q	11.11	4	Did not advance	
Anavia Battle	200 m	22.54	2 Q	—N/a		23.02	6	Did not advance	
Jenna Prandini	200 m	22.56	1 Q	—N/a		22.57	5	Did not advance	
Gabrielle Thomas	200 m	22.20	2 Q	—N/a		22.01	3 q	21.87	3rd place, bronze medalist(s)
Allyson Felix	400 m	—N/a		50.84	1 Q	49.89	2 Q	49.46	3rd place, bronze medalist(s)
Quanera Hayes	400 m	—N/a		51.07	2 Q	49.81	3 q	50.88	7
Wadeline Jonathas	400 m	—N/a		50.93	2 Q	50.51	4	Did not advance	
Athing Mu	800 m	2:01.10	1 Q	—N/a		1:58.07	1 Q	1:55.21 NR	1st place, gold medalist(s)
Raevyn Rogers	800 m	2:01.42	1 Q	—N/a		1:59.28	3 q	1:56.81	3rd place, bronze medalist(s)
Ajeé Wilson	800 m	2:00.02	2 Q	—N/a		2:00.79	4	Did not advance	
Heather MacLean	1500 m	4:02.40	5 Q	—N/a		4:05.33	12	Did not advance	
Cory McGee	1500 m	4:05.15	8 q	—N/a		4:10.39	11 qR	4:05.50	12
Elle Purrier St. Pierre	1500 m	4:05.34	3 Q	—N/a		4:01.00	6 q	4:01.75	10
Elise Cranny	5000 m	14:56.14	4 Q	—N/a				14:55.98	13
Rachel Schneider	5000 m	15:00.07	7	—N/a				Did not advance	
Karissa Schweizer	5000 m	14:51.34	7 q	—N/a				14:55.80	11
Alicia Monson	10000 m	—N/a						31:21.36	13
Karissa Schweizer	10000 m	—N/a						31:19.96	12
Emily Sisson	10000 m	—N/a						31:09.58	10
Christina Clemons	100 m hurdles	12.91	2 Q	—N/a		12.76	4	Did not advance	
Gabbi Cunningham	100 m hurdles	12.83	3 Q	—N/a		12.67	4 q	13.01	7
Kendra Harrison	100 m hurdles	12.74	1 Q	—N/a		12.51	2 Q	12.52	2nd place, silver medalist(s)
Anna Cockrell	400 m hurdles	55.37	3 Q	—N/a		54.17	2 Q	54.19	7
Sydney McLaughlin	400 m hurdles	54.65	1 Q	—N/a		53.03	1 Q	51.46 WR	1st place, gold medalist(s)
Dalilah Muhammad	400 m hurdles	53.97	1 Q	—N/a		53.30	1 Q	51.58	2nd place, silver medalist(s)
Emma Coburn	3000 m steeplechase	9:16.91	3 Q	—N/a				DSQ	
Valerie Constien	3000 m steeplechase	9:24.31	4 q	—N/a				9:31.61	12
Courtney Frerichs	3000 m steeplechase	9:19.34	1 Q	—N/a				9:04.79	2nd place, silver medalist(s)
Teahna Daniels; English Gardner^{[b]} Aleia Hobbs^{[b]} Javianne Oliver; Jenna Prandini; Gabrielle Thomas	4 × 100 m relay	41.90	2 Q	—N/a				41.45	2nd place, silver medalist(s)
Kendall Ellis^{[b]} Allyson Felix; Lynna Irby^{[b]} Wadeline Jonathas^{[b]} Sydney McLaughlin; Athing Mu; Dalilah Muhammad; Kaylin Whitney^{[b]}	4 × 400 m relay	3:20.86	1 Q	—N/a				3:16.85	1st place, gold medalist(s)
Sally Kipyego	Marathon	—N/a						2:32.53	17
Molly Seidel	Marathon	—N/a						2:27.46	3rd place, bronze medalist(s)
Aliphine Tuliamuk	Marathon	—N/a						DNF	
Robyn Stevens	20 km walk	—N/a						1:37:42	33

Mixed

Athlete	Event	Heat		Final	
Athlete	Event	Time	Rank	Time	Rank
Bryce Deadmon^{[b]} Kendall Ellis; Elija Godwin^{[b]} Lynna Irby^{[b]} Taylor Manson^{[b]} Vernon Norwood; Trevor Stewart; Kaylin Whitney	4 × 400 m relay	3:11.39	1 Q	3:10.22	3rd place, bronze medalist(s)

^{b} Athletes who participated in the heats only.

Field events
Men

Athlete	Event	Qualification		Final	
Athlete	Event	Distance	Position	Distance	Position
Marquis Dendy	Long jump	7.85	19	Did not advance	
JuVaughn Harrison	Long jump	8.13	5 q	8.15	5
Steffin McCarter	Long jump	7.92	15	Did not advance	
Chris Benard	Triple jump	16.59	18	Did not advance	
Will Claye	Triple jump	16.91	8 q	17.44	4
Donald Scott	Triple jump	17.01	6 q	17.18	7
JuVaughn Harrison	High jump	2.28	=4 q	2.33	7
Shelby McEwen	High jump	2.28	8 q	2.27	12
Darryl Sullivan	High jump	2.17	=30	Did not advance	
KC Lightfoot	Pole vault	5.75	=3 q	5.80	=4
Matt Ludwig	Pole vault	5.50	=19	Did not advance	
Chris Nilsen	Pole vault	5.75	=1 q	5.97	2nd place, silver medalist(s)
Ryan Crouser	Shot put	22.05	1 Q	23.30 OR	1st place, gold medalist(s)
Joe Kovacs	Shot put	20.93	11 q	22.65	2nd place, silver medalist(s)
Payton Otterdahl	Shot put	20.90	12 q	20.32	10
Mason Finley	Discus throw	60.34	23	Did not advance	
Reggie Jagers	Discus throw	61.47	19	Did not advance	
Sam Mattis	Discus throw	63.74	8 q	63.88	8
Michael Shuey	Javelin throw	NM	—	Did not advance	
Curtis Thompson	Javelin throw	78.20	21	Did not advance	
Daniel Haugh	Hammer throw	75.73	12 q	76.22	11
Rudy Winkler	Hammer throw	78.81	2 Q	77.08	7
Alex Young	Hammer throw	75.09	16	Did not advance	

Women

Athlete	Event	Qualification		Final	
Athlete	Event	Distance	Position	Distance	Position
Quanesha Burks	Long jump	6.56	13	Did not advance	
Tara Davis	Long jump	6.85	4 Q	6.84	6
Brittney Reese	Long jump	6.86	3 Q	6.97	2nd place, silver medalist(s)
Tori Franklin	Triple jump	13.68	25	Did not advance	
Jasmine Moore	Triple jump	13.76	23	Did not advance	
Keturah Orji	Triple jump	14.26	11 q	14.59	7
Tynita Butts-Thompson	High jump	1.82	31	Did not advance	
Vashti Cunningham	High jump	1.95	=9 Q	1.96	=6
Rachel McCoy	High jump	1.86	=25	Did not advance	
Morgann LeLeux	Pole vault	4.55	=13 q	NM	—
Sandi Morris	Pole vault	4.40	=16	Did not advance	
Katie Nageotte	Pole vault	4.55	=1 q	4.90	1st place, gold medalist(s)
Adelaide Aquilla	Shot put	17.68	19	Did not advance	
Jessica Ramsey	Shot put	18.75	9 q	NM	—
Raven Saunders	Shot put	19.22	3 Q	19.79	2nd place, silver medalist(s)
Valarie Allman	Discus throw	66.42	1 Q	68.98	1st place, gold medalist(s)
Kelsey Card	Discus throw	56.04	28	Did not advance	
Rachel Dincoff	Discus throw	56.22	27	Did not advance	
Ariana Ince	Javelin throw	54.98	27	Did not advance	
Maggie Malone	Javelin throw	63.07	2 Q	59.82	10
Kara Winger	Javelin throw	59.71	17	Did not advance	
Brooke Andersen	Hammer throw	74.00	3 Q	72.16	10
Gwen Berry	Hammer throw	73.19	7 q	71.35	11
DeAnna Price	Hammer throw	72.55	9 q	73.09	8

Combined events – Men's decathlon

Athlete	Event	100 m	LJ	SP	HJ	400 m	110H	DT	PV	JT	1500 m	Total	Rank
Steve Bastien	Result	10.69	7.39	14.40	2.05	47.64	14.42	40.77	4.60	58.21	4:26.95	8236	10
Steve Bastien	Points	931	908	753	850	927	921	680	790	711	765	8236	10
Garrett Scantling	Result	10.67	7.30	15.59	1.99	48.25	14.03	45.46	5.10	69.10	4:35.54	8611	4
Garrett Scantling	Points	935	886	826	794	897	971	776	941	876	709	8611	4
Zach Ziemek	Result	10.55	7.20	14.99	2.05	49.06	14.51	44.87	5.30	60.44	4:38.38	8435	6
Zach Ziemek	Points	963	862	789	850	858	910	764	1004	744	691	8435	6

Combined events – Women's heptathlon

Athlete	Event	100H	HJ	SP	200 m	LJ	JT	800 m	Total	Rank
Erica Bougard	Result	13.14	1.86	12.69	24.08	6.06	46.60	2:15.92	6379	9
Erica Bougard	Points	1103	1054	707	973	868	794	880	6379	9
Annie Kunz	Result	13.49	1.80	15.15	24.12	6.32	42.77	2:15.93	6420	6
Annie Kunz	Points	1052	978	871	969	949	721	880	6420	6
Kendell Williams	Result	12.97	1.80	12.41	24.00	6.57	48.78	2:16.91	6508	5
Kendell Williams	Points	1129	978	688	981	1030	836	866	6508	5

== Badminton ==
The United States entered four badminton players into the Olympic tournament. Beiwen Zhang was selected among the top 40 individual shuttlers to compete in the women's singles based on the BWF World Race to Tokyo Rankings. On the men's side, Timothy Lam and Chew brothers Phillip and Ryan received an invitation from the Badminton World Federation to play in the singles and doubles events, respectively, as the next highest-ranked shuttler or pair outside of direct qualifying position. The team was supported at the Olympic Games by coach Ding Chao and team leader Alistair Casey.

Athlete	Event	Group stage				Elimination	Quarterfinal	Semifinal	Final / BM	
Athlete	Event	Opposition Score	Opposition Score	Opposition Score	Rank	Opposition Score	Opposition Score	Opposition Score	Opposition Score	Rank
Timothy Lam	Men's singles	Momota (JPN); L (12–21, 9–21)	Heo (KOR); L (10–21, 15–21)	—N/a	3	Did not advance				
Phillip Chew; Ryan Chew	Men's doubles	Li / Liu (CHN); L (9–21, 17–21)	Kamura / Sonoda (JPN); L (11–21, 3–21)	Lamsfuß / Seidel (GER); L (10–21, 16–21)	4	—N/a	Did not advance			
Beiwen Zhang	Women's singles	Ulitina (UKR); W (21–12, 21–7)	Silva (BRA); W (21–9, 21–10)	—N/a	1 Q	He (CHN); L (21–14, 7–9 ^{RET})	Did not advance			

== Baseball ==
The U.S. baseball team qualified for the Olympics by winning the Americas qualifying event.

Summary

Team	Event	Group stage			Round 1	Repechage 1	Round 2	Repechage 2	Semifinals	Final / BM	
Team	Event	Opposition Result	Opposition Result	Rank	Opposition Result	Opposition Result	Opposition Result	Opposition Result	Opposition Result	Opposition Result	Rank
United States men's	Men's tournament	Israel; W 8–1	South Korea; W 4–2	1 Q	Bye		Japan; L 6–7 (F/10)	Dominican Republic; W 3–1	South Korea; W 7–2	Japan; L 0–2	2nd place, silver medalist(s)

Team roster
USA Baseball announced the final roster on July 2, 2021.

Player	No.	Pos.	Date of birth (age)	Team	League	Birthplace
Nick Martinez	14	RHP	August 5, 1990 (aged 30)	(Japan) Fukuoka SoftBank Hawks	(Japan) Nippon Professional Baseball	(United States) Miami, FL
Scott Kazmir	15	LHP	January 24, 1984 (aged 37)	(United States) San Francisco Giants (minors)	(United States) Minor League Baseball	(United States) Houston, TX
Ryder Ryan	28	RHP	May 11, 1995 (aged 26)	(United States) Texas Rangers (minors)	(United States) Minor League Baseball	(United States) Huntersville, NC
David Robertson	30	RHP	April 9, 1985 (aged 36)	(United States) High Point Rockers	(United States) Atlantic League	(United States) Birmingham, AL
Anthony Gose	31	LHP	August 10, 1990 (aged 30)	(United States) Cleveland Guardians (minors)	(United States) Minor League Baseball	(United States) Paramount, CA
Brandon Dickson	32	RHP	November 3, 1984 (aged 36)	(United States) St. Louis Cardinals (minors)	(United States) Minor League Baseball	(United States) Montgomery, AL
Edwin Jackson	33	RHP	September 9, 1983 (aged 37)	(United States) High Point Rockers	(United States) Atlantic League	(Germany) Neu-Ulm
Shane Baz	35	RHP	June 17, 1999 (aged 22)	(United States) Tampa Bay Rays (minors)	(United States) Minor League Baseball	(United States) Cypress, TX
Scott McGough	39	RHP	October 31, 1989 (aged 31)	(Japan) Tokyo Yakult Swallows	(Japan) Nippon Professional Baseball	(United States) Pittsburgh, PA
Joe Ryan	40	RHP	June 5, 1996 (aged 25)	(United States) Minnesota Twins (minors)	(United States) Minor League Baseball	(United States) San Francisco, CA
Simeon Woods Richardson	44	RHP	September 27, 2000 (aged 20)	(Canada) Toronto Blue Jays (minors)	(United States) Minor League Baseball	(United States) Sugar Land, TX
Anthony Carter	48	RHP	April 4, 1986 (aged 35)	(Mexico) Saraperos de Saltillo	(Mexico) Mexican League	(United States) Decatur, GA
Mark Kolozsvary	8	C	September 4, 1995 (aged 25)	(United States) Cincinnati Reds (minors)	(United States) Minor League Baseball	(United States) Eustis, FL
Tim Federowicz	34	C	August 5, 1987 (aged 33)	(United States) Los Angeles Dodgers (minors)	(United States) Minor League Baseball	(United States) Erie, PA
Eddy Alvarez	2	IF	January 30, 1990 (aged 31)	(United States) Miami Marlins (minors)	(United States) Minor League Baseball	(United States) Miami, FL
Nick Allen	10	IF	October 8, 1998 (aged 22)	(United States) Oakland Athletics (minors)	(United States) Minor League Baseball	(United States) San Diego, CA
Jamie Westbrook	12	IF	June 18, 1995 (aged 26)	(United States) Milwaukee Brewers (minors)	(United States) Minor League Baseball	(United States) Springfield, MA
Todd Frazier	25	IF	February 12, 1986 (aged 35)	(United States) Sussex County Miners	(United States) Frontier League	(United States) Point Pleasant, NJ
Triston Casas	26	IF	January 15, 2000 (aged 21)	(United States) Boston Red Sox (minors)	(United States) Minor League Baseball	(United States) Pembroke Pines, FL
Eric Filia	5	OF	July 6, 1992 (aged 29)	(United States) Seattle Mariners (minors)	(United States) Minor League Baseball	(United States) Carlsbad, CA
Jack López	7	OF	December 16, 1992 (aged 28)	(United States) Boston Red Sox (minors)	(United States) Minor League Baseball	(Puerto Rico) Río Piedras
Patrick Kivlehan	16	OF	December 22, 1989 (aged 31)	(United States) San Diego Padres (minors)	(United States) Minor League Baseball	(United States) Nyack, NY
Tyler Austin	23	OF	September 6, 1991 (aged 29)	(Japan) Yokohama DeNA BayStars	(Japan) Nippon Professional Baseball	(United States) Conyers, GA
Bubba Starling	24	OF	August 3, 1992 (aged 28)	(United States) Kansas City Royals (minors)	(United States) Minor League Baseball	(United States) Gardner, KS

Group play

Pos	Team	Pld	W	L	RF	RA	RD	PCT	GB	Qualification
1	United States	2	2	0	12	3	+9	1.000	—	Round 2
2	South Korea	2	1	1	8	9	−1	.500	1	Round 1 game #2
3	Israel	2	0	2	6	14	−8	.000	2	Round 1 game #1

Source: TOCOG and WBSC

30 July 19:00 Yokohama Stadium
Team	1	2	3	4	5	6	7	8	9	R	H	E
United States	0	0	3	0	0	1	2	1	1	8	11	0
Israel	0	0	0	1	0	0	0	0	0	1	7	2
WP: Joe Ryan (1–0) LP: Joey Wagman (0–1); Home runs: USA: Tyler Austin (1); ISR: Danny Valencia (1); Boxscore

31 July 19:00 Yokohama Stadium
Team	1	2	3	4	5	6	7	8	9	R	H	E
South Korea	1	0	0	0	0	0	0	0	1	2	5	0
United States	0	0	0	2	2	0	0	0	X	4	6	0
WP: Nick Martinez (1–0) LP: Ko Young-pyo (0–1) Sv: David Robertson (1); Home runs: KOR: None; USA: Triston Casas (1), Nick Allen (1); Boxscore

Round 2

2 August 19:00 Yokohama Stadium
Team	1	2	3	4	5	6	7	8	9	10	R	H	E
United States	0	0	0	3	3	0	0	0	0	0	6	12	2
Japan (10)	0	0	2	1	2	0	0	0	1	1	7	12	0
WP: Ryoji Kuribayashi (2–0) LP: Edwin Jackson (0–1); Home runs: USA: Triston Casas (2); JPN: Seiya Suzuki (1); Boxscore

Round 2 repechage

4 August 12:00 Yokohama Stadium
Team	1	2	3	4	5	6	7	8	9	R	H	E
Dominican Republic	0	0	0	0	0	0	0	0	1	1	5	0
United States	2	0	0	0	1	0	0	0	X	3	3	3
WP: Scott Kazmir (1–0) LP: Denyi Reyes (0–1) Sv: David Robertson (2); Home runs: DOM: Charlie Valerio (1); USA: Triston Casas (3), Tyler Austin (2); Boxscore

Semifinal

5 August 19:00 Yokohama Stadium
Team	1	2	3	4	5	6	7	8	9	R	H	E
South Korea	0	0	0	0	1	0	1	0	0	2	7	0
United States	0	1	0	1	0	5	0	0	X	7	9	1
WP: Ryder Ryan (1–0) LP: Lee Eui-lee (0–1); Home runs: KOR: None; USA: Jamie Westbrook (1); Boxscore

Gold medal game

7 August 19:00 Yokohama Stadium
Team	1	2	3	4	5	6	7	8	9	R	H	E
United States	0	0	0	0	0	0	0	0	0	0	6	1
Japan	0	0	1	0	0	0	0	1	X	2	8	0
WP: Masato Morishita (2–0) LP: Nick Martinez (1–1) Sv: Ryoji Kuribayashi (3); Home runs: USA: None; JPN: Munetaka Murakami (1); Boxscore

== Basketball ==
=== 5×5 basketball ===
Summary

Team	Event	Group stage				Quarterfinal	Semifinal	Final / BM	
Team	Event	Opposition Score	Opposition Score	Opposition Score	Rank	Opposition Score	Opposition Score	Opposition Score	Rank
United States men's	Men's tournament	France; L 76–83	Iran; W 120–66	Czech Republic; W 119–84	2 Q	Spain; W 95–81	Australia; W 97–78	France; W 87–82	1st place, gold medalist(s)
United States women's	Women's tournament	Nigeria; W 81–72	Japan; W 86–69	France; W 92–83	1 Q	Australia; W 79–55	Serbia; W 79–59	Japan; W 90–75	1st place, gold medalist(s)

==== Men's tournament ====
The U.S. men's basketball team qualified for the Olympics by advancing to the quarterfinal stage as one of the two top-ranked squads from the Americas at the 2019 FIBA World Cup in China.

Team roster The roster was updated on July 16, 2021.

United States men's national basketball team – 2020 Summer Olympics roster
Players
Coaches

Pos.	No.	Name	Age – Date of birth	Height	Club	Ctr.
C	13	Bam Adebayo	24 – July 18, 1997	6 ft 9 in (2.06 m)	Miami Heat	(United States)
G	15	Devin Booker	24 – October 30, 1996	6 ft 5 in (1.96 m)	Phoenix Suns	(United States)
F	7	Kevin Durant	32 – September 29, 1988	6 ft 10 in (2.08 m)	Brooklyn Nets	(United States)
F	9	Jerami Grant	27 – March 12, 1994	6 ft 8 in (2.03 m)	Detroit Pistons	(United States)
F	14	Draymond Green	31 – March 4, 1990	6 ft 6 in (1.98 m)	Golden State Warriors	(United States)
G	12	Jrue Holiday	31 – June 12, 1990	6 ft 3 in (1.91 m)	Milwaukee Bucks	(United States)
F	4	Keldon Johnson	21 – October 11, 1999	6 ft 5 in (1.96 m)	San Antonio Spurs	(United States)
G	5	Zach LaVine	26 – March 10, 1995	6 ft 5 in (1.96 m)	Chicago Bulls	(United States)
G	6	Damian Lillard	31 – July 15, 1990	6 ft 2 in (1.88 m)	Portland Trail Blazers	(United States)
C	11	JaVale McGee	33 – January 19, 1988	7 ft 0 in (2.13 m)	Denver Nuggets	(United States)
F	8	Khris Middleton	29 – August 12, 1991	6 ft 7 in (2.01 m)	Milwaukee Bucks	(United States)
F	10	Jayson Tatum	23 – March 3, 1998	6 ft 8 in (2.03 m)	Boston Celtics	(United States)

Head coach

- (United States) Gregg Popovich

Assistant coach(es)

- (United States) Steve Kerr
- (United States) Lloyd Pierce
- (United States) Jay Wright
- (Nigeria) Ime Udoka

Legend

- Club – describes last
  club before the tournament
- Age – describes age
  on July 25, 2021

Roster

Group play

Pos	Team	Pld	W	L	PF	PA	PD	Pts	Qualification
1	France	3	3	0	259	215	+44	6	Quarterfinals
2	United States	3	2	1	315	233	+82	5	Quarterfinals
3	Czech Republic	3	1	2	245	294	−49	4	
4	Iran	3	0	3	206	283	−77	3	

Source: TOCOG and FIBA
Rules for classification: 1) classification points; 2) head-to-head results; 3) head-to-head game points difference; 4) head-to-head number of game points scored.

25 July 2021
21:00
v

Boxscore

France	83–76	United States
Scoring by quarter: 15–22, 22–23, 25–11, 21–20
Pts: Fournier 28; Rebs: Gobert 9 Asts: Batum, De Colo 5		Pts: Holiday 18; Rebs: Adebayo 10; Asts: Green, Holiday 4

Saitama Super Arena, Saitama
Referees: Guilherme Locatelli (BRA), Michael Weiland (CAN), Manuel Mazzoni (ITA)

28 July 2021
13:40
v

Boxscore

United States	120–66	Iran
Scoring by quarter: 28–12, 32–18, 22–13, 38–23
Pts: Lillard 21; Rebs: Booker, Durant 5 Asts: LaVine 8		Pts: Haddadi, Jamshidi 14; Rebs: Haddadi 7 Asts: Jalalpoor, Jamshidi 3

Saitama Super Arena, Saitama
Referees: Antonio Conde (ESP), Yohan Rosso (FRA), Andreia Silva (BRA)

31 July 2021
21:00
v

Boxscore

United States	119–84	Czech Republic
Scoring by quarter: 18–25, 29–18, 35–17, 37–24
Pts: Tatum 27; Rebs: Durant 8 Asts: Durant 6		Pts: Schilb 17; Rebs: Satoranský 6 Asts: Satoranský 8

Saitama Super Arena, Saitama
Referees: Aleksandar Glišić (SRB), Manuel Mazzoni (ITA), Maripier Malo (CAN)

Quarterfinal

3 August 2021
13:40
v

Boxscore

Spain	81–95	United States
Scoring by quarter: 21–19, 22–24, 20–26, 18–26
Pts: Rubio 38; Rebs: W. Hernangómez 10; Asts: W. Hernangómez 3		Pts: Durant 29; Rebs: Booker 9 Asts: Booker, Holiday 5

Saitama Super Arena, Saitama
Referees: Guilherme Locatelli (BRA), Yohan Rosso (FRA), Michael Weiland (CAN)

Semifinal

5 August 2021
13:15
v

Boxscore

United States	97–78	Australia
Scoring by quarter: 18–24, 24–21, 32–10, 23–23
Pts: Durant 23; Rebs: Durant 9 Asts: Holiday 8		Pts: Mills 15; Rebs: Landale 6 Asts: Mills 8

Saitama Super Arena, Saitama
Referees: Ademir Zurapović (BIH), Michael Weiland (CAN), Manuel Mazzoni (ITA)

Gold medal game

7 August 2021
11:30
v

Boxscore

France	82–87	United States
Scoring by quarter: 18–22, 21–22, 24–27, 19–16
Pts: Fournier, Gobert 16; Rebs: Gobert 8 Asts: de Colo 7		Pts: Durant 29; Rebs: Tatum 7 Asts: Green 5

Saitama Super Arena, Saitama
Referees: Guilherme Locatelli (BRA), Ademir Zurapović (BIH), Michael Weiland (CAN)

==== Women's tournament ====
The U.S. women's basketball team qualified for the Olympics by winning the gold medal and securing an outright berth at the 2018 FIBA Women's World Cup in Spain.

Team roster The roster was announced on 21 June 2021.

United States women's national basketball team – 2020 Summer Olympics roster
Players
Coaches

Pos.	No.	Name	Age – Date of birth	Height	Club	Ctr.
G	4	Jewell Loyd	27 – 5 October 1993	1.75 m (5 ft 9 in)	Seattle Storm	(United States)
G	5	Skylar Diggins-Smith	30 – 2 August 1990	1.75 m (5 ft 9 in)	Phoenix Mercury	(United States)
G	6	Sue Bird	40 – 16 October 1980	1.75 m (5 ft 9 in)	Seattle Storm	(United States)
G	7	Ariel Atkins	24 – 30 July 1996	1.73 m (5 ft 8 in)	Washington Mystics	(United States)
SG	8	Chelsea Gray	28 – 8 October 1992	1.80 m (5 ft 11 in)	Las Vegas Aces	(United States)
F	9	A'ja Wilson	24 – 8 August 1996	1.93 m (6 ft 4 in)	Las Vegas Aces	(United States)
PF	10	Breanna Stewart	26 – 27 August 1994	1.91 m (6 ft 3 in)	Seattle Storm	(United States)
SF	11	Napheesa Collier	24 – 23 September 1996	1.86 m (6 ft 1 in)	Minnesota Lynx	(United States)
SG	12	Diana Taurasi	39 – 11 June 1982	1.82 m (6 ft 0 in)	Phoenix Mercury	(United States)
C	13	Sylvia Fowles	35 – 6 October 1985	1.98 m (6 ft 6 in)	Minnesota Lynx	(United States)
C	14	Tina Charles	32 – 5 December 1988	1.93 m (6 ft 4 in)	Washington Mystics	(United States)
C	15	Brittney Griner	30 – 18 October 1990	2.03 m (6 ft 8 in)	Phoenix Mercury	(United States)

Head coach

- (United States) Dawn Staley

Assistant coach(es)

- (United States) Dan Hughes
- (United States) Cheryl Reeve
- (United States) Jennifer Rizzotti

Legend

- (C) Team captain
- Club – describes last
  club before the tournament
- Age – describes age
  on 26 July 2021

Group play

Pos	Team	Pld	W	L	PF	PA	PD	Pts	Qualification
1	United States	3	3	0	260	223	+37	6	Quarterfinals
2	Japan (H)	3	2	1	245	239	+6	5	Quarterfinals
3	France	3	1	2	239	229	+10	4	Quarterfinals
4	Nigeria	3	0	3	217	270	−53	3	

Source: TOCOG and FIBA
Rules for classification: 1) classification points; 2) head-to-head results; 3) head-to-head game points difference; 4) head-to-head number of game points scored.
(H) Hosts

27 July 2021
13:40
v

Boxscore

Nigeria	72–81	United States
Scoring by quarter: 20–17, 12–27, 18–26, 22–11
Pts: Kalu 16; Rebs: Kunaiyi-Akpannah 9 Asts: Amukamara 4		Pts: Wilson 19; Rebs: Wilson 13; Asts: Bird 13

Saitama Super Arena, Saitama
Referees: Yu Jung (TPE), Scott Beker (AUS), Gizella Györgyi (NOR)

30 July 2021
13:40
v

Boxscore

United States	86–69	Japan
Scoring by quarter: 28–30, 21–10, 16–13, 21–16
Pts: Wilson 20; Rebs: Stewart 13; Asts: Bird, Stewart 6		Pts: Takada 15; Rebs: Akaho 8 Asts: Machida 11

Saitama Super Arena, Saitama
Referees: Yener Yılmaz (TUR), Yevgeniy Mikheyev (KAZ), Gizella Györgyi (NOR)

2 August 2021
13:40
v

Boxscore

France	82–93	United States
Scoring by quarter: 22–19, 22–31, 23–21, 15–22
Pts: Miyem 15; Rebs: Gruda 6 Asts: Johannès 7		Pts: Wilson 22; Rebs: Stewart, Wilson 7 Asts: Loyd 8

Saitama Super Arena, Saitama
Referees: Manuel Mazzoni (ITA), Ferdinand Pascual (PHI), Rabah Noujaim (LIB)

Quarterfinal

4 August 2021
13:40
v

Boxscore

Australia	55–79	United States
Scoring by quarter: 12–26, 15–22, 12–20, 16–11
Pts: Mitchell 14; Rebs: Allen, George 7 Asts: Mitchell 6		Pts: Stewart 23; Rebs: Griner 8 Asts: Gray 8

Saitama Super Arena, Saitama
Referees: Ferdinand Pascual (PHI), Takaki Kato (JPN), Yevgeniy Mikheyev (KAZ)

Semifinal

6 August 2021
13:40
v

Boxscore

United States	79–59	Serbia
Scoring by quarter: 25–12, 16–11, 17–16, 21–20
Pts: Griner 15; Rebs: Griner 12; Asts: Bird, Taurasi 4		Pts: Anderson 15; Rebs: Dugalić 10; Asts: Vasić 3

Saitama Super Arena, Saitama
Referees: Antonio Conde (ESP), Yu Jung (TPE), Andreia Silva (BRA)

Gold medal game

8 August 2021
11:30
v

Boxscore

United States	90–75	Japan
Scoring by quarter: 23–14, 27–25, 25–17, 15–19
Pts: Griner 30; Rebs: Stewart 14; Asts: Taurasi 8		Pts: Takada 17; Rebs: Okoye 8 Asts: Machida 6

Saitama Super Arena, Saitama
Referees: Manuel Mazzoni (ITA), Andreia Silva (BRA), Maripier Malo (CAN)

=== 3×3 basketball ===
In 3x3 men's basketball, the 2019 world champion U.S. team did not compete after having to field an entirely new team for the qualifiers due to scheduling issues.

Summary

Team	Event	Pool play								Quarterfinal	Semifinal	Final / BM	
Team	Event	Opposition Result	Opposition Result	Opposition Result	Opposition Result	Opposition Result	Opposition Result	Opposition Result	Rank	Opposition Result	Opposition Result	Opposition Result	Rank
United States women	Women's tournament	France; W 17–10	Mongolia; W 21–9	Romania; W 22–11	ROC; W 20–16	Italy; W 17–13	China; W 21–19	Japan; L 18–20	1 Q	Bye	France; W 18–16	ROC; W 18–15	1st place, gold medalist(s)

==== Women's tournament ====
The United States women's national 3x3 team qualified for the Olympics by securing a top three finish at the 2021 Olympic Qualifying Tournament.

Katie Lou Samuelson originally qualified as the fourth team member of the United States, but she tested positive for COVID-19 and was replaced by Jackie Young.

Team roster
The players were announced on June 23, 2021.

- Stefanie Dolson
- Allisha Gray
- Kelsey Plum
- Jackie Young

Group play

Pos	Team	Pld	W	L	PF	PA	PD	Qualification
1	United States	7	6	1	136	98	+38	Semifinals
2	ROC	7	5 (Note: ROC 2–0, China 1–1, Japan 0–2)	2	129	90	+39	Semifinals
3	China	7	5	2	127	97	+30	Quarterfinals
4	Japan (H)	7	5	2	130	97	+33	Quarterfinals
5	France	7	4	3	118	116	+2	Quarterfinals
6	Italy	7	2	5	98	125	−27	Quarterfinals
7	Romania	7	1	6	89	142	−53	
8	Mongolia	7	0	7	79	141	−62	

Source: TOCOG and FIBA
Rules for classification: 1) Wins; 2) Head-to-head record; 3) Points scored.
(H) Hosts
Notes:

24 July 2021
17:55
v

Report

United States	17–10	France
Pts: Dolson 7		Pts: Paget, Touré 3

Aomi Urban Sports Park, Tokyo
Referees: Jasmina Juras (SRB), Edmond Ho (HKG)

24 July 2021
21:00
v

Report

Mongolia	9–21	United States
Pts: Chimeddolgor 6		Pts: Gray 9

Aomi Urban Sports Park, Tokyo
Referees: Su Yu-yen (TPE), Vlad Ghizdareanu (ROU)

25 July 2021
17:30
v

Report

Romania	11–22	United States
Pts: Cuic 7		Pts: Plum 12

Aomi Urban Sports Park, Tokyo
Referees: Sara El-Sharnouby (EGY), Marek Maliszewski (POL)

25 July 2021
21:25
v

Report

ROC	16–20	United States
Pts: Kozik 8		Pts: Gray 8

Aomi Urban Sports Park, Tokyo
Referees: Jasmina Juras (SRB), Edmond Ho (HKG)

26 July 2021
17:55
v

Report

Italy	13–17	United States
Pts: D'Alie, Rulli 4		Pts: Dolson, Gray 6

Aomi Urban Sports Park, Tokyo
Referees: Shi Qirong (CHN), Vlad Ghizdareanu (ROU)

26 July 2021
21:00
v

Report

United States	21–19	China
Pts: Plum 10		Pts: Yang 8

Aomi Urban Sports Park, Tokyo
Referees: Sara El-Sharnouby (EGY), Markos Michaelides (SUI)

27 July 2021
13:30
v

Report

United States	18–20	Japan
Pts: Dolson 7		Pts: Yamamoto 8

Aomi Urban Sports Park, Tokyo
Referees: Evgeny Ostrovskiy (RUS), Shi Qirong (CHN)

Semifinal

28 July 2021
17:00
v

Report

United States	18–16	France
Pts: Gray, Plum 6		Pts: Filip 8

Aomi Urban Sports Park, Tokyo
Referees: Jasmina Juras (SRB), Vlad Ghizdareanu (ROU)

Gold medal match

28 July 2021
21:55
v

Report

United States	18–15	ROC
Pts: Dolson 7		Pts: Logunova 6

Aomi Urban Sports Park, Tokyo
Referees: Edmond Ho (HKG), Cecília Tóth (HUN)

== Boxing ==
The United States entered ten boxers into the Olympic tournament. All of them qualified based on rankings after the 2021 Pan American Boxing Olympic Qualification Tournament, which was due to be held in Buenos Aires, Argentina, was cancelled.

Men

Athlete	Event	Round of 32	Round of 16	Quarterfinals	Semifinals	Final	
Athlete	Event	Opposition Result	Opposition Result	Opposition Result	Opposition Result	Opposition Result	Rank
Duke Ragan	Featherweight	Kistohurry (FRA); W 3–2	Temirzhanov (KAZ); W 5–0	Walker (IRL); W 3–2	Takyi (GHA); W 4–1	Batyrgaziev (ROC); L 2–3	2nd place, silver medalist(s)
Keyshawn Davis	Lightweight	Lacruz (NED); W 5–0	Oumiha (FRA); W RSC	Mamedov (ROC); W 4–1	Bachkov (ARM); W 5–0	Cruz (CUB); L 1–4	2nd place, silver medalist(s)
Delante Johnson	Welterweight	Arregui (ARG); W 3–2	Zhussupov (KAZ); W 4–1	Iglesias (CUB); L 0–5	Did not advance		
Troy Isley	Middleweight	Bandarenka (BLR); W 5–0	Bakshi (ROC); L 2–3	Did not advance			
Richard Torrez	Super heavyweight	Bye	Bouloudinat (ALG); W 5–0	Peró (CUB); W 4–1	Kunkabayev (KAZ); W RSC	Jalolov (UZB); L 0–5	2nd place, silver medalist(s)

Women

Athlete	Event	Round of 32	Round of 16	Quarterfinals	Semifinals	Final	
Athlete	Event	Opposition Result	Opposition Result	Opposition Result	Opposition Result	Opposition Result	Rank
Virginia Fuchs	Flyweight	Soluianova (ROC); W 3–2	Krasteva (BUL); L 0–5	Did not advance			
Yarisel Ramirez	Featherweight	Čačić (CRO); L 0–5	Did not advance				
Rashida Ellis	Lightweight	Bye	Dubois (GBR); L 0–3	Did not advance			
Oshae Jones	Welterweight	Bye	Cruz (MEX); W 3–2	Moronta (DOM); W 4–0	Gu (CHN); L 1–4	Did not advance	3rd place, bronze medalist(s)
Naomi Graham	Middleweight	—N/a	Magomedalieva (ROC); L 1–4	Did not advance			

== Canoeing ==
=== Slalom ===
U.S. canoeists qualified one boat for each of the following classes through the 2019 ICF Canoe Slalom World Championships in La Seu d'Urgell, Spain. With the cancellation of the 2021 Pan American Championships, the U.S. team accepted the invitation from the ICF to send a canoeist in the men's slalom C-1 to the Games, as the highest-ranked eligible nation from the Americas in the federation's international rankings.

Athlete	Event	Preliminary						Semifinal		Final	
Athlete	Event	Run 1	Rank	Run 2	Rank	Best	Rank	Time	Rank	Time	Rank
Zachary Lokken	Men's C-1	99.74	3	166.94	17	99.74	4 Q	105.97	7 Q	106.08	7
Michal Smolen	Men's K-1	96.61	13	98.03	22	96.61	19 Q	96.11	3 Q	99.12	5
Evy Leibfarth	Women's C-1	115.55	7	113.06	6	113.06	7 Q	183.32	18	Did not advance	
Evy Leibfarth	Women's K-1	123.85	20	109.70	14	109.70	15 Q	112.73	12	Did not advance	

=== Sprint ===
The United States qualified a single boat in the women's C-1 200 m for the Games by winning the gold medal at the 2019 ICF Canoe Sprint World Championships in Szeged, Hungary.

Teenager Nevin Harrison won a historic first ever gold medal for the United States in the women's canoe.

Athlete	Event	Heats		Quarterfinals		Semifinals		Final	
Athlete	Event	Time	Rank	Time	Rank	Time	Rank	Time	Rank
Nevin Harrison	Women's C-1 200 m	44.938	1 SF	Bye		46.697	1 FA	45.932	1st place, gold medalist(s)

Qualification Legend: FA = Qualify to final (medal); FB = Qualify to final B (non-medal); SF = Qualify to semifinal; QF = Qualify to quarterfinal

== Cycling ==
The Americans won a bronze medal in women's track team pursuit (headlined by Chloé Dygert). Despite having won four world championships in 2016, 2017, 2018, and 2020, and featuring 2018 world champion and 2019 world cup winner Kate Courtney, the U.S. did not medal in mountain biking. The U.S. was also shut out of medals in BMX racing. In BMX freestyle, 2021 world champion Hannah Roberts won silver. The only gold medal of the cycling delegation was won by Jennifer Valente, who scored an upset victory in the women's omnium.

=== Road ===
Six U.S. riders (two men and four women) entered into their respective Olympic road races, by virtue of their top 50 national finish (for men) and top 22 (for women) in the UCI World Ranking.

With her golden finish in the women's time trial at the 2019 UCI World Championships, Rio 2016 silver medalist Chloé Dygert Owen was automatically selected to the U.S. road cycling squad for the Games.

Men

Athlete	Event	Time	Rank
Lawson Craddock	Road race	6:21:46	80
Brandon McNulty	Road race	6:06:33	6
Lawson Craddock	Time trial	1:03:52.99	34
Brandon McNulty	Time trial	59:57.73	24

Women

Athlete	Event	Time	Rank
Chloé Dygert	Road race	3:58:51	31
Coryn Rivera	Road race	3:54:31	7
Leah Thomas	Road race	3:56:07	29
Ruth Winder	Road race	4:02:16	45
Chloé Dygert	Time trial	32:29.89	7
Amber Neben	Time trial	31:26.13	5

=== Track ===
Following the completion of the 2020 UCI Track Cycling World Championships, U.S. riders accumulated spots for both men and women in the omnium and madison, as well as the women's sprint, keirin, and team pursuit, based on their country's results in the final UCI Olympic rankings.

Sprint

Athlete	Event	Qualification		Round 1	Repechage 1	Round 2	Repechage 2	Round 3	Repechage 3	Quarterfinals	Semifinals	Final	
Athlete	Event	Time speed (km/h)	Rank	Opposition Time Speed (km/h)	Opposition Time Speed (km/h)	Opposition Time Speed (km/h)	Opposition Time Speed (km/h)	Opposition Time Speed (km/h)	Opposition Time Speed (km/h)	Opposition Time Speed (km/h)	Opposition Time Speed (km/h)	Opposition Time Speed (km/h)	Rank
Madalyn Godby	Women's sprint	10.869; 66.243	20 Q	Genest (CAN); L	Lee (KOR); Shmeleva (ROC); W 11.372; 63.313	Friedrich (GER); L	Lee (HKG); L	Did not advance					

Pursuit

Athlete	Event	Qualification		Semifinal	Final	
Athlete	Event	Time	Rank	Opponent Results	Opponent Results	Rank
Chloé Dygert; Megan Jastrab; Jennifer Valente; Emma White; Lily Williams^{[c]}	Women's team pursuit	4:10.118	3	Great Britain; L 4:07.562	Canada; W 4:08.040	3rd place, bronze medalist(s)

^{c} Cyclist that participated in the semifinal but not final race.

Keirin

Athlete	Event	1st Round	Repechage	Quarterfinal	Semifinal	Final
Athlete	Event	Rank	Rank	Rank	Rank	Rank
Madalyn Godby	Women's keirin	2 QF	Bye	5	Did not advance	

Omnium

Athlete	Event	Scratch race		Tempo race		Elimination race		Points race		Total	
Athlete	Event	Points	Rank	Points	Rank	Points	Rank	Points	Rank	Points	Rank
Gavin Hoover	Men's omnium	22	10	22	5	74	11	25	8	99	8
Jennifer Valente	Women's omnium	40	1	36	3	34	4	14	3	124	1st place, gold medalist(s)

Madison

Athlete	Event	Points	Laps	Rank
Adrian Hegyvary; Gavin Hoover	Men's madison	DNF		
Megan Jastrab; Jennifer Valente	Women's madison	1	0	9

=== Mountain biking ===
The United States entered three mountain bikers to compete in the women's Olympic cross-country race, by virtue of Kate Courtney's win at the Pan American Games, and a combined national ranking ensuring two other women got to participate.

Athlete	Event	Time	Rank
Christopher Blevins	Men's cross-country	1:28:13	14
Haley Batten	Women's cross-country	1:20:13	9
Kate Courtney	Women's cross-country	1:22:19	15
Erin Huck	Women's cross-country	LAP (1 lap)	31

=== BMX ===
U.S. riders qualified for five quota place (two men and three women) for BMX at the Olympics, as a result in the UCI BMX Olympic Qualification Ranking List of June 1, 2021.

Defending Olympic champion Connor Fields suffered a crash in his semi-final heat and was unable to start in the final. He was hospitalized.

Alise Willoughby was the reigning world champion but she also suffered a crash and did not qualify for the final.

Race

Athlete	Event	Quarterfinal		Semifinal		Final	
Athlete	Event	Points	Rank	Points	Rank	Time	Rank
Connor Fields	Men's race	4	1 Q	12	4 Q	DNS	
Corben Sharrah	Men's race	11	4 Q	22	8	Did not advance	
Payton Ridenour	Women's race	13	5	Did not advance			
Felicia Stancil	Women's race	5	2 Q	7	1 Q	45.131	4
Alise Willoughby	Women's race	3	1 Q	18	8	Did not advance	

Freestyle
U.S. riders received a single quota spot each in the inaugural men's and women's BMX freestyle at the Games. Commanding the top spot in the USA Cycling rankings before the May 12 cutoff, 18-year-old Hannah Roberts was officially selected to Team USA's BMX cycling team for the Games.

Athlete	Event	Seeding		Final	
Athlete	Event	Score	Rank	Score	Rank
Nick Bruce	Men's freestyle	3.80	9	24.60	9
Justin Dowell	Men's freestyle	75.20	8	44.60	8
Perris Benegas	Women's freestyle	86.50	2	88.50	4
Hannah Roberts	Women's freestyle	87.70	1	96.10	2nd place, silver medalist(s)

== Diving ==
U.S. divers qualified for the following individual spots and synchronized teams at the Games through the 2019 FINA World Championships. Divers had to finish in the top two of each individual event and accumulate the highest score as a pair in each of the synchronized events at the 2020 U.S. Olympic Trials, held in Indianapolis, Indiana (June 6 to 13), to assure their selection to the Olympic team.

Men

Athlete	Event	Preliminary		Semifinal		Final	
Athlete	Event	Points	Rank	Points	Rank	Points	Rank
Andrew Capobianco	3 m springboard	385.50	17 Q	419.60	10 Q	401.70	10
Tyler Downs	3 m springboard	348.70	23	Did not advance			
Brandon Loschiavo	10 m platform	403.85	11 Q	409.75	10 Q	383.65	11
Jordan Windle	10 m platform	390.05	15 Q	409.80	9 Q	407.90	9
Andrew Capobianco; Michael Hixon	3 m synchronized springboard	—N/a				444.36	2nd place, silver medalist(s)

Women

Athlete	Event	Preliminary		Semifinal		Final	
Athlete	Event	Points	Rank	Points	Rank	Points	Rank
Hailey Hernandez	3 m springboard	309.55	6 Q	291.60	10 Q	288.45	9
Krysta Palmer	3 m springboard	279.10	15 Q	316.65	5 Q	343.75	3rd place, bronze medalist(s)
Delaney Schnell	10 m platform	360.75	3 Q	342.75	3 Q	340.40	5
Katrina Young	10 m platform	286.65	17 Q	263.60	17	Did not advance	
Alison Gibson; Krysta Palmer	3 m synchronized springboard	—N/a				263.49	8
Jessica Parratto; Delaney Schnell	10 m synchronized platform	—N/a				310.80	2nd place, silver medalist(s)

== Equestrian ==
U.S. equestrians qualified a full squad each in the team dressage, eventing, and jumping competitions through the 2018 FEI World Equestrian Games in Tryon, North Carolina and the 2019 Pan American Games in Lima, Peru.

=== Dressage ===
The U.S. Olympic dressage team was announced on June 17, 2021. The team was led by London 2012 Olympian Adrienne Lyle, and rounded up by the two German-born riders, veteran Steffen Peters and rookie Sabine Schut-Kery. Nick Wagman and Don John were named the traveling reserves.

Athlete	Horse	Event	Grand Prix		Grand Prix Special		Grand Prix Freestyle			
Athlete	Horse	Event	Score	Rank	Score	Rank	Technical	Artistic	Total	Rank
Adrienne Lyle	Salvino	Individual	74.876	14 Q	—N/a		DNS			
Steffen Peters	Suppenkasper	Individual	76.196	11 q	—N/a		76.393	85.543	80.968	10
Sabine Schut-Kery	Sanceo	Individual	78.416	7 Q	—N/a		80.143	88.457	84.300	5
Adrienne Lyle; Steffen Peters; Sabine Schut-Kery	See above	Team	7389.5	4 Q	7747.0	2nd place, silver medalist(s)	—N/a			

Qualification Legend: Q = Qualified for the final based on position in group; q = Qualified for the final based on overall position

=== Eventing ===
The U.S. Olympic eventing team was announced on May 27, 2021. The team was led by two Olympic veterans, Phillip Dutton and Boyd Martin, both Australian-born, and completed by rookie Liz Halliday-Sharp. Doug Payne and Vandiver were named the team alternates. On July 7, 2021, Liz Halliday-Sharp and Deniro Z were withdrawn from the Olympic team. Doug Payne stepped in to be a replacement, while Tamie Smith and Mai Baum became the new traveling alternates.

Athlete	Horse	Event	Dressage		Cross-country			Jumping						Total	
Athlete	Horse	Event	Dressage		Cross-country			Qualifier			Final			Total	
Athlete	Horse	Event	Penalties	Rank	Penalties	Total	Rank	Penalties	Total	Rank	Penalties	Total	Rank	Penalties	Rank
Phillip Dutton	Z	Individual	30.50	16	4.80	35.30	17	8.00	43.30	19 Q	10.80	54.10	21	54.10	21
Boyd Martin	Tsetserleg	Individual	31.10	20	3.20	34.30	14	4.40	38.70	15 Q	13.60	52.30	20	52.30	20
Doug Payne	Vandiver	Individual	33.00	30	6.80	39.80	23	4.00	43.80	20 Q	4.40	48.20	16	48.20	16
Phillip Dutton; Boyd Martin; Doug Payne	See above	Team	94.60	8	14.80	109.40	5	16.40	125.80	6	—N/a			125.80	6

=== Jumping ===
The U.S. Olympic jumping team was named on July 5, 2021. The team consisted of two Olympic veterans, Kent Farrington and Laura Kraut, who were joined by rookie Jessica Springsteen.

Athlete	Horse	Event	Qualification		Final			Jump-off		
Athlete	Horse	Event	Penalties	Rank	Penalties	Time	Rank	Penalties	Time	Rank
Kent Farrington	Gazelle	Individual	4	=31	Did not advance					
Laura Kraut	Baloutinue	Individual	8	=44	Did not advance					
Jessica Springsteen	Don Juan van de Donkhoeve	Individual	4	=31	Did not advance					
Laura Kraut; Jessica Springsteen; McLain Ward	Baloutinue; Don Juan van de Donkhoeve; Contagious	Team	13	5 Q	8	237.20	=1	0	124.20	2nd place, silver medalist(s)

== Fencing ==
U.S. fencers qualified a full squad each in the men's and women's team foil and women's team épée at the Games, by finishing among the top four nations in the FIE Olympic Team Rankings, while the sabre and men's épée teams claimed the spot each as the highest-ranked nation from the Americas zone outside the world's top four.

On January 11, 2020, Lee Kiefer became the first fencer to guarantee selection to the U.S. team for her third consecutive Games, with a dominant number-one position in the national women's foil rankings. A month later, Kiefer's husband Gerek Meinhardt, the first U.S. male fencer slated to compete in four Olympics since Michael Marx did so in Atlanta 1996, and his childhood friend and teammate Alexander Massialas, the first U.S. male fencer to win two medals in the same edition, secured the men's foil spots on their third consecutive trip together to the Games. Rio 2016 Olympian Eli Dershwitz, with two-time champion Mariel Zagunis (2004 and 2008) going to her fifth straight Olympics, topped the national men's and women's sabre rankings, respectively, to join the U.S. fencing roster in Tokyo. Nine more fencers were officially selected to the roster for the rescheduled Games on March 23, 2021, including épée sisters Courtney and Kelley Hurley and Rio 2016 silver medalist Daryl Homer in the men's sabre. The men's and women's foil teams completed the fencers' selection for the Games on March 28, 2021.

The 2019 world champions U.S. men's foil team won a bronze, and 2018 world champions U.S. women's foil team missed the podium. Lee Kiefer scored an upset victory over defending Olympic and world champion Inna Deriglazova of the ROC to win the first ever women's foil gold for the United States.

Men

Athlete	Event	Round of 64	Round of 32	Round of 16	Quarterfinal	Semifinal	Final / BM	
Athlete	Event	Opposition Score	Opposition Score	Opposition Score	Opposition Score	Opposition Score	Opposition Score	Rank
Jacob Hoyle	Épée	Bye	Park (KOR); L 10–15	Did not advance				
Curtis McDowald	Épée	Bye	Bardenet (FRA); L 12–15	Did not advance				
Yeisser Ramirez	Épée	Niggeler (SUI); W 15–6	Bida (ROC); L 2–15	Did not advance				
Jacob Hoyle; Curtis McDowald; Yeisser Ramirez	Team épée	—N/a		Japan; L 39–45	Did not advance			
Nick Itkin	Foil	Bye	A Borodachev (ROC); W 15–11	K Borodachev (ROC); L 13–15	Did not advance			
Alexander Massialas	Foil	Bye	Joppich (GER); L 12–15	Did not advance				
Gerek Meinhardt	Foil	Bye	Mylnikov (ROC); L 11–15	Did not advance				
Race Imboden; Nick Itkin; Alexander Massialas; Gerek Meinhardt	Team foil	—N/a		Bye	Germany; W 45–36	ROC; L 41–45	Japan; W 45–31	3rd place, bronze medalist(s)
Eli Dershwitz	Sabre	Bye	Streets (JPN); W 15–9	Kim (KOR); L 9–15	Did not advance			
Daryl Homer	Sabre	Bye	Amer (EGY); L 11–15	Did not advance				
Andrew Mackiewicz	Sabre	Shimamura (JPN); W 15–13	Oh (KOR); L 7–15	Did not advance				
Eli Dershwitz; Daryl Homer; Andrew Mackiewicz; Khalil Thompson	Team sabre	—N/a		Bye	Hungary; L 36–45	Classification semifinal Iran; L 36–45	Seventh place final ROC; L WO	8

Women

Athlete	Event	Round of 64	Round of 32	Round of 16	Quarterfinal	Semifinal	Final / BM	
Athlete	Event	Opposition Score	Opposition Score	Opposition Score	Opposition Score	Opposition Score	Opposition Score	Rank
Katharine Holmes	Épée	Bye	Song (KOR); L 12–15	Did not advance				
Courtney Hurley	Épée	Bye	Zhu (CHN); L 8–15	Did not advance				
Kelley Hurley	Épée	Bye	Kirpu (EST); W 15–14	Murtazaeva (ROC); L 11–12	Did not advance			
Katharine Holmes; Courtney Hurley; Kelley Hurley; Anna van Brummen	Team épée	—N/a			South Korea; L 33–38	Classification semifinal Hong Kong; W 42–31	Fifth place final Poland; W 33–26	5
Jacqueline Dubrovich	Foil	Bye	Ebert (GER); L 14–15	Did not advance				
Lee Kiefer	Foil	Bye	Berthier (SGP); W 15–4	Harvey (CAN); W 15–13	Ueno (JPN); W 15–11	Korobeynikova (ROC); W 15–6	Deriglazova (ROC); W 15–13	1st place, gold medalist(s)
Nicole Ross	Foil	Bye	Karemete (TUR); W 15–5	Ueno (JPN); L 9–15	Did not advance			
Jacqueline Dubrovich; Lee Kiefer; Nicole Ross; Sabrina Massialas	Team foil	—N/a			Japan; W 45–36	ROC; L 42–45	Italy; L 23–45	4
Anne-Elizabeth Stone	Sabre	Bye	Bashta (AZE); L 9–15	Did not advance				
Dagmara Wozniak	Sabre	Bye	Nikitina (ROC); L 14–15	Did not advance				
Mariel Zagunis	Sabre	Bye	Page (CAN); W 15–3	Kim (KOR); W 15–12	Velikaya (ROC); L 8–15	Did not advance		
Francesca Russo; Anne-Elizabeth Stone; Dagmara Wozniak; Mariel Zagunis	Team sabre	—N/a		Bye	France; L 30–45	Classification semifinal China; W 45–35	Fifth place final Japan; L 43–45	6

== Football (soccer) ==
Summary

Key:

- A.E.T – After extra time.
- P – Match decided by penalty-shootout.

Team	Event	Group stage				Quarterfinal	Semifinal	BM	
Team	Event	Opposition Score	Opposition Score	Opposition Score	Rank	Opposition Score	Opposition Score	Opposition Score	Rank
United States women's	Women's tournament	Sweden; L 0–3	New Zealand; W 6–1	Australia; D 0–0	2 Q	Netherlands; W 2–2 (4–2)	Canada; L 0–1	Australia; W 4–3	3rd place, bronze medalist(s)

=== Women's tournament ===
The United States women's soccer team qualified for the Olympics by reaching the finals of the 2020 CONCACAF Women's Olympic Qualifying Championship in Carson, California.

The 2019 world champions USWNT, unbeaten for more than two years, lost its opener to Sweden and then lost to Canada in the semi-finals. They ultimately won the bronze medal.

Team roster
The final squad of 22 was announced on 23 June 2021.

Head coach: (North Macedonia) Vlatko Andonovski

No.	Pos.	Player	Date of birth (age)	Caps	Goals	Club
1	GK	Alyssa Naeher	20 April 1988 (aged 33)	73	0	(United States Soccer Federation) Chicago Red Stars
2	DF	Crystal Dunn	3 July 1992 (aged 29)	116	24	(United States Soccer Federation) Portland Thorns
3	MF	Sam Mewis	9 October 1992 (aged 28)	77	23	(United States Soccer Federation) North Carolina Courage
4	DF	Becky Sauerbrunn (captain)	6 June 1985 (aged 36)	188	0	(United States Soccer Federation) Portland Thorns
5	DF	Kelley O'Hara	4 August 1988 (aged 32)	140	2	(United States Soccer Federation) Washington Spirit
6	MF	Kristie Mewis	25 February 1991 (aged 30)	26	4	(United States Soccer Federation) Houston Dash
7	FW	Tobin Heath	29 May 1988 (aged 33)	171	35	Unattached
8	MF	Julie Ertz	6 April 1992 (aged 29)	110	20	(United States Soccer Federation) Chicago Red Stars
9	MF	Lindsey Horan	26 May 1994 (aged 27)	98	22	(United States Soccer Federation) Portland Thorns
10	FW	Carli Lloyd	16 July 1982 (aged 39)	306	126	(United States Soccer Federation) Gotham FC
11	FW	Christen Press	29 December 1988 (aged 32)	149	63	Unattached
12	DF	Tierna Davidson	19 September 1998 (aged 22)	34	1	(United States Soccer Federation) Chicago Red Stars
13	FW	Alex Morgan	2 July 1989 (aged 32)	180	110	(United States Soccer Federation) Orlando Pride
14	DF	Emily Sonnett	25 November 1993 (aged 27)	56	0	(United States Soccer Federation) Washington Spirit
15	FW	Megan Rapinoe	5 July 1985 (aged 36)	179	59	(United States Soccer Federation) OL Reign
16	MF	Rose Lavelle	14 May 1995 (aged 26)	56	14	(United States Soccer Federation) OL Reign
17	DF	Abby Dahlkemper	13 May 1993 (aged 28)	71	0	(The Football Association) Manchester City
18	GK	Adrianna Franch	12 November 1990 (aged 30)	6	0	(United States Soccer Federation) Portland Thorns
19	MF	Catarina Macario	4 October 1999 (aged 21)	7	1	(French Football Federation) Lyon
20	DF	Casey Krueger	23 August 1990 (aged 30)	34	0	(United States Soccer Federation) Chicago Red Stars
21	FW	Lynn Williams	21 May 1993 (aged 28)	37	11	(United States Soccer Federation) North Carolina Courage
22	GK	Jane Campbell	17 February 1995 (aged 26)	5	0	(United States Soccer Federation) Houston Dash

Group play

Pos	Team	Pld	W	D	L	GF	GA	GD	Pts	Qualification
1	Sweden	3	3	0	0	9	2	+7	9	Advance to knockout stage
2	United States	3	1	1	1	6	4	+2	4	Advance to knockout stage
3	Australia	3	1	1	1	4	5	−1	4	Advance to knockout stage
4	New Zealand	3	0	0	3	2	10	−8	0	

Source: TOCOG and FIFA
Rules for classification: Group stage tiebreakers
21 July 2021
17:30

Sweden	3–0	United States
Blackstenius 25', 54'; Hurtig 72'	Report (TOCOG); Report (FIFA)

Tokyo Stadium, Chōfu
Attendance: 0
Referee: Yoshimi Yamashita (Japan)

24 July 2021
20:30

New Zealand	1–6	United States
Hassett 72'	Report (TOCOG); Report (FIFA)	Lavelle 9'; Horan 45'; Erceg 63' (o.g.); Press 80'; Morgan 88'; Bott 90+3' (o.g.)

Saitama Stadium 2002, Saitama
Attendance: 0
Referee: Stéphanie Frappart (France)

27 July 2021
17:00

United States	0–0	Australia
	Report (TOCOG); Report (FIFA)

Kashima Stadium, Kashima
Attendance: 0
Referee: Anastasia Pustovoitova (Russia)

Quarterfinal

30 July 2021
20:00

Netherlands	2–2 (a.e.t.)	United States
Miedema 18', 54'	Report (TOCOG); Report (FIFA)	S. Mewis 28'; Williams 31'
Penalties
Miedema (penalty missed); Janssen (penalty scored); Van der Gragt (penalty scored); Nouwen (penalty missed)	2–4	(penalty scored) Lavelle; (penalty scored) Morgan; (penalty scored) Press; (penalty scored) Rapinoe

International Stadium Yokohama, Yokohama
Attendance: 0
Referee: Kate Jacewicz (Australia)

Semifinal

2 August 2021
17:00

United States	0–1	Canada
	Report (TOCOG); Report (FIFA)	Fleming 75' (pen.)

Kashima Stadium, Kashima
Attendance: 0
Referee: Kateryna Monzul (Ukraine)

Bronze medal final

5 August 2021
17:00

Australia	3–4	United States
Kerr 17'; Foord 54'; Gielnik 90'	Report (TOCOG); Report (FIFA)	Rapinoe 8', 21'; Lloyd 45+1', 51'

Kashima Stadium, Kashima
Attendance: 0
Referee: Laura Fortunato (Argentina)

== Golf ==
The United States entered a total of four male and four female golfers into the Olympic tournament. Bryson DeChambeau was originally selected for the men's team, but he tested positive for COVID-19 and was replaced by Patrick Reed.

Xander Schauffele won gold for the United States in the men's tournament with a winning score of −18, holding off a late charge by Slovakia's Rory Sabbatini to emerge victorious by one stroke. Top-seeded Collin Morikawa finished fourth in the seven-man third-place playoff. In the women's tournament, Nelly Korda clinched the gold medal with a winning score of −17.

Men

Athlete	Event	Round 1	Round 2	Round 3	Round 4	Total			Playoff	
Athlete	Event	Score	Score	Score	Score	Score	Par	Rank	Score	Rank
Collin Morikawa	Men's	69	70	67	63	269	−15	=3	10	=4
Patrick Reed	Men's	68	71	70	65	274	−10	=22	—N/a	
Xander Schauffele	Men's	68	63	68	67	266	−18	1st place, gold medalist(s)	—N/a	
Justin Thomas	Men's	71	70	68	65	274	−10	=22	—N/a	

Women

Athlete	Event	Round 1	Round 2	Round 3	Round 4	Total		
Athlete	Event	Score	Score	Score	Score	Score	Par	Rank
Danielle Kang	Women's	69	69	74	65	277	−7	=20
Jessica Korda	Women's	71	67	73	64	275	−9	=15
Nelly Korda	Women's	67	62	69	69	267	−17	1st place, gold medalist(s)
Lexi Thompson	Women's	72	71	69	69	281	−3	33

== Gymnastics ==
=== Artistic ===
The United States fielded a full squad of eight gymnasts (four per gender) into the Olympic competition. At the 2018 World Championships in Doha, Qatar, the women's squad scored a gold-medal victory in the team all-around to book an automatic berth for Tokyo 2020. Meanwhile, the men's squad was added to the U.S. gymnastics roster after finishing fourth out of the nations eligible for qualification in the preliminaries of the team all-around at the 2019 World Championships in Stuttgart, Germany.

In gymnastics, health concerns caused four-time gold medalist and 19-time world champion Simone Biles to withdraw from the women's team event, in which the U.S. ultimately won the silver medal. Biles subsequently skipped four individual events before returning for the balance beam event, in which she won a bronze medal. Sunisa Lee won the gold medal in the women's artistic individual all-around. The four members of the United States women's team, Biles, Jordan Chiles, Sunisa Lee, and Grace McCallum were nicknamed the Fighting Four as a tribute to the adversity they faced.

Men
Team

Athlete	Event	Qualification								Final							
Athlete	Event	Apparatus						Total	Rank	Apparatus						Total	Rank
Athlete	Event	F	PH	R	V	PB	HB	Total	Rank	F	PH	R	V	PB	HB	Total	Rank
Brody Malone	Team	~~13.666~~	13.733	14.200	14.533	14.633	14.533 Q	85.298	11 Q	—N/a	14.000	14.100	14.233	—N/a	14.633	—N/a	
Sam Mikulak	Team	14.466	13.900	13.866	14.133	15.433 Q	~~12.866~~	84.664	14 Q	12.133	13.733	—N/a	14.466	15.000	14.566	—N/a	
Yul Moldauer	Team	14.866 Q	14.233	14.033	14.133	~~13.900~~	12.933	84.098	19	14.366	14.366	13.900	14.200	14.566	—N/a	—N/a	
Shane Wiskus	Team	14.733	~~13.366~~	~~13.866~~	~~3.000~~	14.700	13.700	83.365	21	13.466	—N/a	14.166	—N/a	14.700	14.000	—N/a	
Total	Team	44.065	41.866	42.099	42.799	44.766	41.166	256.761	4 Q	39.965	42.099	42.166	42.899	44.266	43.199	254.594	5

Individual finals

Athlete	Event	Qualification								Final							
Athlete	Event	Apparatus						Total	Rank	Apparatus						Total	Rank
Athlete	Event	F	PH	R	V	PB	HB	Total	Rank	F	PH	R	V	PB	HB	Total	Rank
Brody Malone	All-around	See team results								14.300	14.100	13.833	14.366	13.466	14.400	84.465	10
Sam Mikulak	All-around	See team results								12.933	13.566	13.533	14.533	14.966	13.633	83.164	12
Yul Moldauer	Floor	14.866	—N/a					14.866	6 Q	13.533	—N/a					13.533	6
Alec Yoder	Pommel horse	—N/a	15.200	—N/a				15.200	4 Q	—N/a	14.566	—N/a				14.566	6
Sam Mikulak	Parallel bars	—N/a				15.433	—N/a	15.433	5 Q	—N/a				15.000	—N/a	15.000	6
Brody Malone	Horizontal bar	—N/a					14.533	14.533	4 Q	—N/a					14.200	14.200	4

Women
Team

Athlete	Event	Qualification						Final					
Athlete	Event	Apparatus				Total	Rank	Apparatus				Total	Rank
Athlete	Event	V	UB	BB	F	Total	Rank	V	UB	BB	F	Total	Rank
Simone Biles	Team	15.183 Q^{[b]}	14.566 Q^{[b]}	14.066 Q	14.133 Q^{[b]}	57.731	1 Q^{[b]}	13.766	—N/a			—N/a	
Jordan Chiles	Team	14.700	~~12.866~~	~~11.566~~	13.566	52.968	40	14.666	14.166	13.433	11.700	—N/a	
Sunisa Lee	Team	~~14.333~~	15.200 Q	14.200 Q	~~13.433~~	57.166	3 Q	—N/a	15.400	14.133	13.666	—N/a	
Grace McCallum	Team	14.533	14.100	13.066	13.466	55.165	13	14.300	13.700	13.666	13.500	—N/a	
Total	Team	44.199	43.866	41.332	41.165	170.562	2 Q	42.732	43.266	41.232	38.866	166.096	2nd place, silver medalist(s)

Individual finals

Athlete	Event	Qualification						Final					
Athlete	Event	Apparatus				Total	Rank	Apparatus				Total	Rank
Athlete	Event	V	UB	BB	F	Total	Rank	V	UB	BB	F	Total	Rank
Jade Carey	All-around	15.166	14.133	12.866	14.100	56.265	9 R	15.200	13.500	11.533	13.966	54.199	8
Sunisa Lee	All-around	See team results						14.600	15.300	13.833	13.700	57.433	1st place, gold medalist(s)
Jade Carey	Vault	15.166	—N/a			15.166	2 Q	12.416	—N/a			12.416	8
MyKayla Skinner	Vault	14.866	—N/a			14.866	4 R	14.916	—N/a			14.916	2nd place, silver medalist(s)
Sunisa Lee	Uneven bars	—N/a	15.200	—N/a		15.200	2 Q	—N/a	14.500	—N/a		14.500	3rd place, bronze medalist(s)
Simone Biles	Balance beam	—N/a		14.066	—N/a	14.066	7 Q	—N/a		14.000	—N/a	14.000	3rd place, bronze medalist(s)
Sunisa Lee	Balance beam	—N/a		14.200	—N/a	14.200	3 Q	—N/a		13.866	—N/a	13.866	5
Jade Carey	Floor	—N/a			14.100	14.100	3 Q	—N/a			14.366	14.366	1st place, gold medalist(s)

^{b} Biles withdrew from the finals for all-around, uneven bars, vault, and floor.

=== Rhythmic ===
Two U.S. rhythmic gymnasts qualified for the individual all-around by finishing in the top 16 at the 2019 World Championships in Baku, Azerbaijan. Additionally, the United States qualified for the group all-around after the re-allocation of Japan's host nation spot from the 2019 World Championships. The individuals and group members of the rhythmic gymnastics team were announced on June 27, 2021.

Individual

Athlete	Event	Qualification						Final					
Athlete	Event	Hoop	Ball	Clubs	Ribbon	Total	Rank	Hoop	Ball	Clubs	Ribbon	Total	Rank
Evita Griskenas	Individual	23.675	23.400	23.850	20.775	91.700	12	Did not advance					
Laura Zeng	Individual	22.000	23.700	24.700	21.000	91.400	13	Did not advance					

Team

Athlete	Event	Qualification				Final			
Athlete	Event	5 apps	3+2 apps	Total	Rank	5 apps.	3+2 apps	Total	Rank
Isabelle Connor; Camilla Feeley; Lili Mizuno; Nicole Sladkov; Elizaveta Pletneva	Group	37.850	35.825	73.675	11	Did not advance			

=== Trampoline ===
Nicole Ahsinger's sixth-place finish was the highest-ever achievement in the trampoline discipline by an American.

Athlete	Event	Qualification		Final	
Athlete	Event	Score	Rank	Score	Rank
Aliaksei Shostak	Men's	82.150	13	Did not advance	
Nicole Ahsinger	Women's	102.110	7 Q	54.350	6

== Judo ==
The United States entered four judoka (one man and three women) into the Olympic tournament based on the International Judo Federation Olympics Individual Ranking, after reallocations.

Athlete	Event	Round of 64	Round of 32	Round of 16	Quarterfinals	Semifinals	Repechage	Final / BM	
Athlete	Event	Opposition Result	Opposition Result	Opposition Result	Opposition Result	Opposition Result	Opposition Result	Opposition Result	Rank
Colton Brown	Men's −90 kg	Bye	Schwendinger (LIE); W 11–00	Žgank (TUR); L 00–01	Did not advance				
Angelica Delgado	Women's −52 kg	—N/a	Ramos (POR); W 10–00	Pupp (HUN); L 00–10	Did not advance				
Nefeli Papadakis	Women's −78 kg	—N/a	Yoon (KOR); L 00–10	Did not advance					
Nina Cutro-Kelly	Women's +78 kg	—N/a	Velenšek (SLO); L 00–11	Did not advance					

== Karate ==
Four U.S. karateka were entered into the inaugural Olympic tournament. 2012 world bronze medalist and defending Pan American Games champion Sakura Kokumai qualified directly for the women's kata category by finishing among the top four karateka at the end of the combined WKF Olympic Rankings. Thomas Scott earned his ticket to Tokyo after the reallocation of a vacant spot in the Male Kumite −75 kg category of the Olympic competition.

Kumite

Athlete	Event	Group stage					Semifinals	Final	
Athlete	Event	Opposition Result	Opposition Result	Opposition Result	Opposition Result	Rank	Opposition Result	Opposition Result	Rank
Thomas Scott	Men's −75 kg	Nishimura (JPN); L 0–2	Hárspataki (HUN); W 8–3	Horuna (UKR); L 1–2	Abdelaziz (EGY); W 7–6	3	Did not advance		
Brian Irr	Men's +75 kg	Gaysinsky (CAN); D 0–0	Hamedi (KSA); L 1–4	Ganjzadeh (IRI); L 0–6	Kvesić (CRO); L 1–3	5	Did not advance		

Kata

Athlete	Event	Elimination round		Ranking round		Final / BM	
Athlete	Event	Score	Rank	Score	Rank	Opposition Result	Rank
Ariel Torres	Men's kata	26.19	2 Q	26.46	2 Q	Díaz (VEN); W 26.72–26.34	3rd place, bronze medalist(s)
Sakura Kokumai	Women's kata	25.75	3 Q	25.54	3 Q	Bottaro (ITA); L 25.40–26.48	5

== Modern pentathlon ==
U.S. athletes qualified for the following spots to compete in modern pentathlon. Amro El-Geziry, a three-time Olympian from Egypt who immigrated to the United States, and rookie Samantha Achterberg secured a selection each in the men's and women's event respectively by virtue of a top-five finish at the 2019 Pan American Games in Lima.

Athlete	Event	Fencing (Épée one touch)				Swimming (200 m freestyle)			Riding (Show jumping)			Combined: shooting / running (10 m air pistol) / (3200 m)			Total	
Athlete	Event	RR	BR	Rank	MP points	Time	Rank	MP points	Penalties	Rank	MP points	Time	Rank	MP points	MP points	Rank
Amro El-Geziry	Men's	16–19	2	22	198	1:52.96 OR	1	325	10	10	290	12:35.32	36	545	1358	25
Samantha Achterberg	Women's	9–26	1	35	155	2:15.78	19	279	11	17	289	12:25.56	14	555	1278	21

== Rowing ==
The United States qualified the nine boats in the table below out of the fourteen Olympic classes, with the majority of crews confirming Olympic places for their boats at the 2019 FISA World Championships in Ottensheim, Austria. Rowing events were qualified by nation, so rowers had to be selected by the NOCs for each of these crews. The women's lightweight double qualified at the Final Olympic Qualification Regatta on May 16 and 17 in Lucerne.

London 2012 Olympian Kara Kohler became the first rower to guarantee her selection on the U.S. team for the rescheduled Games with an outright triumph in the women's single sculls at the first Olympic Trials in Sarasota, Florida, on February 21 to 26, 2021. Meanwhile, Genevra Stone, Rio 2016 silver medalist in the single sculls, teamed up with her rookie partner Kristina Wagner to secure the women's double sculls spot at the second Olympic Trials (April 12 to 15, 2021) in West Windsor, New Jersey. The fours, eights, and women's quad were selected through camps, with the final nomination made by the Olympic Committee on June 18.

The Americans finished without a single rowing medal for the first time in history. The three-time defending gold medalists women's eight finished fourth.

Men

Athlete	Event	Heat		Repechage		Final	
Athlete	Event	Time	Rank	Time	Rank	Time	Rank
Clark Dean; Michael Grady; Andrew Reed; Anders Weiss	Four	5:57.27	2 FA	Bye		5:48.85	5
Justin Best; Liam Corrigan; Ben Davison; Austin Hack; Conor Harrity; Nick Mead; Alex Miklasevich; Alexander Richards; Julian Venonsky	Eight	5:30.57	2 R	5:23.43	3 FA	5:26.75	4

Women

Athlete	Event	Heat		Repechage		Quarterfinal		Semifinal		Final	
Athlete	Event	Time	Rank	Time	Rank	Time	Rank	Time	Rank	Time	Rank
Kara Kohler	Single sculls	7:49.71	1 QF	Bye		7:59.39	2 SA/B	7:26.10	4 FB	7:29.72	9
Tracy Eisser; Megan Kalmoe	Pair	7:26.95	4 R	7:29.87	2 SA/B	—N/a		7:02.52	5 FB	7:02.16	10
Genevra Stone; Kristina Wagner	Double sculls	6:55.65	2 SA/B	Bye		—N/a		7:11.14	3 FA	6:52.98	5
Mary Reckford; Michelle Sechser	Lightweight double sculls	7:05.30	3 R	7:21.25	1 SA/B	—N/a		6:41.54	2 FA	6:48.54	5
Kendall Chase; Claire Collins; Grace Luczak; Madeleine Wanamaker	Four	6:43.80	4 R	6:53.26	5 FB	—N/a				6:33.65	7
Cicely Madden; Meghan O'Leary; Alie Rusher; Ellen Tomek	Quadruple sculls	6:34.36	5 R	6:50.74	6 FB	—N/a				6:30.03	10
Charlotte Buck; Olivia Coffey; Gia Doonan; Katelin Guregian; Brooke Mooney; Meghan Musnicki; Kristine O'Brien; Regina Salmons; Jessica Thoennes	Eight	6:08.69	1 FA	Bye		—N/a				6:02.78	4

Qualification Legend: FA=Final A (medal); FB=Final B (non-medal); FC=Final C (non-medal); FD=Final D (non-medal); FE=Final E (non-medal); FF=Final F (non-medal); SA/B=Semifinals A/B; SC/D=Semifinals C/D; SE/F=Semifinals E/F; QF=Quarterfinals; R=Repechage

== Rugby sevens ==
Summary

Team	Event	Pool round				Quarterfinal	Semifinal / Cl.	Final / BM / Pl.	
Team	Event	Opposition Result	Opposition Result	Opposition Result	Rank	Opposition Result	Opposition Result	Opposition Result	Rank
United States men	Men's tournament	Kenya; W 19–14	Ireland; W 19–17	South Africa; L 12–17	2 Q	Great Britain; L 21–26	Classification semifinal Canada; W 21–14	5th place final South Africa; L 7–28	6
United States women	Women's tournament	China; W 28–14	Japan; W 17–7	Australia; W 14–12	1 Q	Great Britain; L 12–21	Classification semifinal China; W 33–14	5th place final Australia; L 7–17	6

=== Men's tournament ===
The United States national rugby sevens team qualified for the Olympics by advancing to the quarterfinals in the 2019 London Sevens, securing a top four spot in the 2018–19 World Rugby Sevens Series.

Team roster
United States' 12-man squad plus one alternate was named on 6 July 2021. Brett Thompson replaced Ben Pinkelman due to injury on 8 July 2021.

Head coach: Mike Friday

No.	Pos.	Player	Date of birth (age)	Events	Points
1	BK	Carlin Isles	21 November 1989 (aged 31)	57	1,037
2	FW	Brett Thompson	17 August 1990 (aged 30)	32	175
3	FW	Danny Barrett	23 March 1990 (aged 31)	54	564
4	FW	Matai Leuta	20 July 1990 (aged 31)	40	135
5	FW	Joe Schroeder	14 June 1993 (aged 28)	12	25
6	BK	Kevon Williams	7 June 1991 (aged 30)	27	192
7	BK	Folau Niua	27 January 1985 (aged 36)	69	647
8	BK	Maceo Brown	1 September 1995 (aged 25)	14	35
9	FW	Stephen Tomasin	25 September 1994 (aged 26)	37	616
10	BK	Madison Hughes (c)	26 October 1992 (aged 28)	52	1,510
11	BK	Perry Baker	29 June 1986 (aged 35)	47	1,027
12	BK	Martin Iosefo	13 January 1990 (aged 31)	46	378
13	BK	Cody Melphy	5 April 1993 (aged 28)	6	53

Group play

Pos	Team	Pld	W	D	L	PF	PA	PD	Pts	Qualification
1	South Africa	3	3	0	0	64	31	+33	9	Quarter-finals
2	United States	3	2	0	1	50	48	+2	7	Quarter-finals
3	Ireland	3	1	0	2	43	59	−16	5	
4	Kenya	3	0	0	3	26	45	−19	3	

Updated to match(es) played on 26 July 2021. Source: Tokyo 2020 and World Rugby
Rules for classification: 1) Points; 2) Head-to-head result; 3) Point difference; 4) Points scored.

26 July 2021
11:30

United States	19–14	Kenya
Try: Isles 2' m Iosefo 4' c Hughes 13' c Con: Hughes (1/2) 5'; Tomasin (1/1) 14'	(Tokyo 2020)	Try: Injera 6' c Oluoch 9' c Con: Agero (2/2) 7', 10'

Tokyo Stadium, Tokyo
Attendance: 0
Referee: Jordan Way (Australia)

26 July 2021
18:30

United States	19–17	Ireland
Try: Baker 1' c Hughes 3' m Tomasin 10' c Con: Hughes (2/3) 2', 10'	(Tokyo 2020)	Try: Lennox 7' m McNulty 8' m Horan 14' c Con: Dardis (0/2); Roche (1/1) 14'

Tokyo Stadium, Tokyo
Attendance: 0
Referee: James Doleman (New Zealand)

27 July 2021
11:30

South Africa	17–12	United States
Try: S. Davids (2) 6' m, 10' m Gans 8' c Con: S. Davids (1/3) 9'	(Tokyo 2020)	Try: Schroeder 1' m Thompson 12' c Con: Melphy (0/1); Hughes (1/1) 13'

Tokyo Stadium, Tokyo
Attendance: 0
Referee: Craig Evans (Wales)

Quarterfinal

27 July 2021
18:00

Great Britain	26–21	United States
Try: Lindsay-Hague 6' c Harris 8' c Davis 10' c Norton 11' m Con: Bibby (3/4) 7', 8', 10'	(Tokyo 2020)	Try: Barrett 1' c Baker (2) 3' c, 4' c Con: Hughes (3/3) 1', 3', 4'

Tokyo Stadium, Tokyo
Attendance: 0
Referee: James Doleman (New Zealand)

Classification semifinal (5–8)

28 July 2021
10:00

Canada	14–21	United States
Try: Jones 6' c Douglas 13' c Con: Hirayama (2/2) 7', 13'	(Tokyo 2020)	Try: Isles (2) 2' c, 14' c Iosefo 12' c Con: Hughes (3/3) 2', 12', 14'

Tokyo Stadium, Tokyo
Attendance: 0
Referee: Francisco González (Uruguay)

Fifth place match

28 July 2021
17:00

United States	7–28	South Africa
Try: Tomasin 4' c Con: Hughes (1/1) 4'	(Tokyo 2020)	Try: Geduld 2' c Makata 7' c Arendse 12' c Gans 14' c Con: Brown (2/2) 2', 7' du Preez (2/2) 13', 14'

Tokyo Stadium, Tokyo
Attendance: 0
Referee: Sam Grove-White (Scotland)

=== Women's tournament ===
The United States women's national rugby sevens team qualified for the Olympics by winning the bronze medal and securing an outright berth at the penultimate leg of the 2018–19 World Rugby Women's Sevens Series.

Team roster
The United States' squad of 12 players was named on 17 June 2021.

Head coach: Rob Cain

- Kayla Canett-Oca
- Lauren Doyle
- Cheta Emba
- Abby Gustaitis (c)
- Nicole Heavirland
- Alev Kelter
- Kristi Kirshe
- Ilona Maher
- Jordan Matyas
- Ariana Ramsey
- Naya Tapper
- Kristen Thomas (c)
- Nia Toliver

Group play

Pos	Team	Pld	W	D	L	PF	PA	PD	Pts	Qualification
1	United States	3	3	0	0	59	33	+26	9	Quarter-finals
2	Australia	3	2	0	1	86	24	+62	7	Quarter-finals
3	China	3	1	0	2	53	54	−1	5	Quarter-finals
4	Japan (H)	3	0	0	3	7	94	−87	3	

Source: Tokyo 2020 and World Rugby
Rules for classification: 1) Points; 2) Head-to-head result; 3) Point difference; 4) Points scored.
(H) Hosts

29 July 2021
10:00

United States	28–14	China
Try: Thomas 5' c Kirshe (2) 10' c, 12' c Canett 14' c Con: Heavirland (2/2) 6', 10'; Kelter (1/1) 13'; Canett (1/1) 14'	(Tokyo 2020)	Try: Wang 3' c Chen 14' +1 c Con: Chen (1/1) 4'; Yu (1/1) 14' +1

Tokyo Stadium, Tokyo

29 July 2021
18:00

United States	17–7	Japan
Try: Maher 1' m Matyas 4' m Ramsey 9' c Con: Canett-Oca (0/2); Heavirland (1/1) 9'	(Tokyo 2020)	Try: Koide 13' c Con: Yamanaka (1/1) 13'

Tokyo Stadium, Tokyo

30 July 2021
10:30

Australia	12–14	United States
Try: Williams 5' c Hayes 8' m Con: Williams (1/2) 6'	(Tokyo 2020)	Try: Emba 9' c Gustaitis 11' c Con: Heavirland (2/2) 10', 11'

Tokyo Stadium, Tokyo

Quarterfinal

30 July 2021
19:00 (Note: Matches were delayed by 30 minutes due to lightning in the area)

United States	12–21	Great Britain
Try: Kirshe 11' m Tapper 14' c Con: Heavirland (1/2) 14'	(Tokyo 2020)	Try: Joyce (2) 1' c, 8' c Brown 2' c Con: Aitchison (3/3) 1', 2', 8'

Tokyo Stadium, Tokyo

Classification semifinal (5–8)

31 July 2021
10:30

United States	33–14	China
Try: Thomas 1' c, 3' c Tapper 6' c Maher 10' m, 14' c Con: Heavirland (4/5) 1', 3', 7', 14'	(Tokyo 2020)	Try: Wang 1' c Chen 9' c Con: Chen (2/2) 2', 9'

Tokyo Stadium, Tokyo

Fifth place match

31 July 2021
17:00

Australia	17–7	United States
Try: Nathan 5' m Ashby 8' m Hayes 12' c Con: Williams (0/2); Hinds (1/1) 12'	(Tokyo 2020)	Try: Kirshe 10' c Con: Heavirland (1/1) 10'

Tokyo Stadium, Tokyo

== Sailing ==
U.S. sailors qualified one boat in each of the following classes through the 2018 Sailing World Championships, the class-associated Worlds, the 2019 Pan American Games, and the continental regattas. The U.S. Olympic team were determined based on the sailors' finishing positions, along with the cumulative series scores, from their respective boats at major international regattas in three selection phases: early, middle, and late.

On February 14, 2020, US Sailing announced the selection for the 49erFX and Nacra 17 crews to represent the country at the Enoshima regatta based on their cumulative results at the 2019 and 2020 World Championships, with windsurfers Pedro Pascual and Farrah Hall and single-handed sailors Charlie Buckingham (Laser) and multiple world medalist Paige Railey (Laser Radial) joining them towards the end of the month.

With the 2020 Olympics rescheduled because of the COVID-19 pandemic, US Sailing updated the athlete selection procedures for the country's sailing squad, which included the men's 470 Olympic trials based on the results of the first two selection meets. Hence, Rio 2016 Olympian David Hughes, with his partner and skipper Stuart McNay returning to the Olympic regatta for the fourth straight time, was officially nominated to the U.S. sailing team on June 23, 2020. Finn sailor Luke Muller joined the roster for his maiden Games on July 10, 2020. The women's 470 crew (Barnes & Dallman-Weiss) rounded out the squad selection at the 2021 Worlds in Vilamoura, Portugal.

Men

Athlete	Event	Race													Net points	Final rank
Athlete	Event	1	2	3	4	5	6	7	8	9	10	11	12	M*	Net points	Final rank
Pedro Pascual	RS:X	6	12	7	9	4	13	7	5	14	14	~~16~~	7	12	110	9
Charlie Buckingham	Laser	9	22	18	5	~~26~~	9	3	2	16	23	—N/a		EL	107	13
Luke Muller	Finn	6	11	12	15	14	4	8	10	12	~~17~~	—N/a		EL	92	13
David Hughes; Stuart McNay	470	8	~~12~~	9	10	8	8	7	9	8	11	—N/a		8	86	9

Women

Athlete	Event	Race													Net points	Final rank
Athlete	Event	1	2	3	4	5	6	7	8	9	10	11	12	M*	Net points	Final rank
Farrah Hall	RS:X	~~21~~	21	7	12	18	18	16	15	8	16	16	16	EL	163	15
Paige Railey	Laser Radial	40	~~UFD~~	25	36	25	UFD	27	17	34	39	—N/a		EL	288	37
Nikki Barnes; Lara Dallman-Weiss	470	13	6	15	13	6	5	19	2	~~UFD~~	19	—N/a		EL	98	12
Stephanie Roble; Maggie Shea	49erFX	3	2	14	7	9	~~16~~	5	8	12	14	DNE	5	EL	101	11

Mixed

Athlete	Event	Race													Net points	Final rank
Athlete	Event	1	2	3	4	5	6	7	8	9	10	11	12	M*	Net points	Final rank
Riley Gibbs; Anna Weis	Nacra 17	9	7	12	6	11	~~13~~	9	12	5	13	4	5	6	99	9

M = Medal race; EL = Eliminated – did not advance into the medal race

== Shooting ==
U.S. shooters achieved quota places for the following events by virtue of their best finishes at the 2018 ISSF World Championships, the 2019 ISSF World Cup series, 2019 Pan American Games, and Championships of the Americas, as long as they obtained a minimum qualifying score (MQS) by May 31, 2020. The U.S. shooting squad was determined based on the aggregate scores obtained by the shooters at two stages of the Olympic Trials (fall and spring).

On February 9, 2020, Team USA announced the first set of shooters to compete at the Games, including Rio 2016 Olympian Lucas Kozeniesky in the air rifle. The remaining shooters were named to the U.S. team at the second stage of the Olympic Team Trials: pistol (February 24 to March 1) and shotgun (February 25 to March 8).

The U.S. won three gold medals, two silver medals, and one bronze medal in shooting.

Men

Athlete	Event	Qualification		Final	
Athlete	Event	Points	Rank	Points	Rank
Lucas Kozeniesky	10 m air rifle	631.5	2 Q	165.0	6
Will Shaner	10 m air rifle	630.8	3 Q	251.6 OR	1st place, gold medalist(s)
Nick Mowrer	50 m rifle 3 positions	1162	26	Did not advance	
Patrick Sunderman	50 m rifle 3 positions	1172	12	Did not advance	
James Hall	10 m air pistol	577	10	Did not advance	
Nick Mowrer	10 m air pistol	576	13	Did not advance	
Jack Leverett III	25 m rapid fire pistol	552	25	Did not advance	
Henry Leverett	25 m rapid fire pistol	566	22	Did not advance	
Brian Burrows	Trap	121	12	Did not advance	
Derrick Mein	Trap	119	24	Did not advance	
Vincent Hancock	Skeet	122 (+8)	4 Q	59 OR	1st place, gold medalist(s)
Phillip Jungman	Skeet	120	15	Did not advance	

Women

Athlete	Event	Qualification		Final	
Athlete	Event	Points	Rank	Points	Rank
Mary Tucker	10 m air rifle	631.4	3 Q	166.0	6
Alison Weisz	10 m air rifle	626.9	14	Did not advance	
Sagen Maddalena	50 m rifle 3 positions	1178	2 Q	427.8	5
Mary Tucker	50 m rifle 3 positions	1167	13	Did not advance	
Alexis Lagan	10 m air pistol	560	38	Did not advance	
Sandra Uptagrafft	10 m air pistol	557	49	Did not advance	
Alexis Lagan	25 m pistol	580	18	Did not advance	
Sandra Uptagrafft	25 m pistol	573	33	Did not advance	
Madelynn Bernau	Trap	119	7	Did not advance	
Kayle Browning	Trap	120 (+1)	6 Q	42	2nd place, silver medalist(s)
Amber English	Skeet	121	3 Q	56 OR	1st place, gold medalist(s)
Austen Smith	Skeet	119	10	Did not advance	

Mixed

Athlete	Event	Qualification		Semifinal		Final / BM	
Athlete	Event	Points	Rank	Points	Rank	Opposition Result	Rank
Lucas Kozeniesky; Mary Tucker	10 m air rifle	628.0	7 Q	418.0	2 Q	Yang Hr / Yang Q (CHN); L 13–17	2nd place, silver medalist(s)
Will Shaner; Alison Weisz	10 m air rifle	629.7	5 Q	416.8	6	Did not advance	
James Hall; Sandra Uptagrafft	10 m air pistol	573	10	Did not advance			
Alexis Lagan; Nick Mowrer	10 m air pistol	565	16	Did not advance			
Kayle Browning; Derrick Mein	Trap	140	13	—N/a		Did not advance	
Brian Burrows; Madelynn Bernau	Trap	146 (+10)	4 Q	—N/a		Kovačócy / Špotáková (SVK); W 42 (+3)–42 (+2)	3rd place, bronze medalist(s)

== Skateboarding ==
The United States qualified seven skateboarders: six in men's and women's park events, based on the Olympic World Skateboarding Rankings List of June 30, 2021, and one in men's street events.

In skateboarding, the United States won two bronze medals. Reigning world champion and favorite Nyjah Huston was shut out of medals after stumbling on his last attempt.

Men

Athlete	Event	Qualification		Final	
Athlete	Event	Score	Rank	Score	Rank
Cory Juneau	Park	73.00	8 Q	84.13	3rd place, bronze medalist(s)
Heimana Reynolds	Park	63.09	13	Did not advance	
Zion Wright	Park	67.21	11	Did not advance	
Jagger Eaton	Street	35.07	2 Q	35.35	3rd place, bronze medalist(s)
Nyjah Huston	Street	34.87	3 Q	26.10	7
Jake Ilardi	Street	29.03	11	Did not advance	

Women

Athlete	Event	Qualification		Final	
Athlete	Event	Score	Rank	Score	Rank
Jordyn Barratt	Park	35.22	11	Did not advance	
Bryce Wettstein	Park	44.50	5 Q	44.50	6
Brighton Zeuner	Park	34.06	12	Did not advance	
Mariah Duran	Street	7.95	13	Did not advance	
Alexis Sablone	Street	11.77	8 Q	13.57	4
Alana Smith	Street	1.25	20	Did not advance	

== Softball ==
The U.S. women's softball team qualified for the Olympics by winning the gold medal and securing a lone outright berth at the 2018 Women's Softball World Championship in Chiba, Japan.

In softball, the 2018 world champion U.S. (that coincidentally won gold in Japan beating the hosts twice throughout the tournament), lost to Japan in the gold medal game after defeating them in the round robin.

Summary

Team	Event	Round robin						Final / BM	
Team	Event	Opposition Result	Opposition Result	Opposition Result	Opposition Result	Opposition Result	Rank	Opposition Result	Rank
United States women's	Women's tournament	Italy; W 2–0	Canada; W 1–0	Mexico; W 2–0	Australia; W 2–1 (F/8)	Japan; W 2–1	1	Japan; L 0–2	2nd place, silver medalist(s)

Team roster
The United States roster was released on June 20, 2021.

Softball at the 2020 Summer Olympics – United States roster
Players		Coaches
Pitchers: 14 Monica Abbott; 21 Rachel Garcia; 38 Cat Osterman	Catchers: 1 Aubree Munro; 4 Amanda Chidester; 34 Dejah Mulipola; Infielders: 2 Ali Aguilar; 3 Ally Carda; 7 Kelsey Stewart; 20 Valerie Arioto; 99 Delaney Spaulding; Outfielders: 8 Haylie McCleney; 9 Janie Reed; 16 Michelle Moultrie; 48 Bubba Nickles	Manager: 0 Ken Eriksen; Coaches: Laura Berg

Group play

Pos	Team	Pld	W	L	RF	RA	RD	PCT	GB	Qualification
1	United States	5	5	0	9	2	+7	1.000	—	Gold medal match
2	Japan (H)	5	4	1	18	5	+13	.800	1	Gold medal match
3	Canada	5	3	2	19	4	+15	.600	2	Bronze medal match
4	Mexico	5	2	3	11	10	+1	.400	3	Bronze medal match
5	Australia	5	1	4	5	21	−16	.200	4	
6	Italy	5	0	5	1	21	−20	.000	5	

Source: Tokyo 2020 and WBSC
(H) Hosts

21 July 12:00 (JST) Fukushima Azuma Baseball Stadium 31 °C (88 °F)
Team	1	2	3	4	5	6	7	R	H	E
Italy	0	0	0	0	0	0	0	0	1	2
United States	0	0	0	1	1	0	X	2	5	0
WP: Cat Osterman (1–0) LP: Greta Cecchetti (0–1) Sv: Monica Abbott (1); Boxscore

24 July 14:30 (JST) Yokohama Stadium 29 °C (84 °F)
Team	1	2	3	4	5	6	7	R	H	E
United States	0	0	2	0	0	0	0	2	6	1
Mexico	0	0	0	0	0	0	0	0	1	3
WP: Cat Osterman (2–0) LP: Dallas Escobedo (0–2) Sv: Monica Abbott (2); Boxscore

26 July 10:00 (JST) Yokohama Stadium 29 °C (84 °F)
Team	1	2	3	4	5	6	7	R	H	E
Japan	1	0	0	0	0	0	0	1	4	0
United States	0	0	0	0	0	1	1	2	4	1
WP: Monica Abbott (3–0) LP: Yamato Fujita (0–1); Home runs: JPN: None; USA: Kelsey Stewart (1); Boxscore

22 July 09:00 (JST) Fukushima Azuma Baseball Stadium 26 °C (79 °F)
Team	1	2	3	4	5	6	7	R	H	E
United States	0	0	0	0	1	0	0	1	7	1
Canada	0	0	0	0	0	0	0	0	1	1
WP: Monica Abbott (1–0) LP: Jenna Caira (0–1); Boxscore

25 July 10:00 (JST) Yokohama Stadium 32 °C (90 °F)
Team	1	2	3	4	5	6	7	8	R	H	E
Australia	0	0	0	0	0	0	0	1	1	3	0
United States (8)	0	0	0	0	0	0	0	2	2	5	0
WP: Monica Abbott (2–0) LP: Tarni Stepto (0–1); Boxscore

Gold medal game

27 July 20:00 (JST) Yokohama Stadium
Team	1	2	3	4	5	6	7	R	H	E
Japan (gold)	0	0	0	1	1	0	0	2	8	0
United States (silver)	0	0	0	0	0	0	0	0	3	0
WP: Yukiko Ueno (2–0) LP: Ally Carda (0–1); Boxscore

== Sport climbing ==
U.S. athletes qualified for the following spots to compete in sport climbing. 18-year-old Brooke Raboutou became the first sport climber to be selected to the U.S. team for the Games by advancing to the final of the women's combined event and securing one of the seven provisional berths at the 2019 IFSC World Championships in Hachioji, Japan. Meanwhile, Nathaniel Coleman and Kyra Condie completed the U.S. sport climbing roster by finishing in the top six of those eligible for qualification at the IFSC World Olympic Qualifying Event in Toulouse, France. The fourth and final slot was awarded to 16-year-old Colin Duffy, after winning the gold medal at the IFSC Pan American Championships in Los Angeles.

Athlete	Event	Qualification									Final								
Athlete	Event	Speed		Boulder		Lead			Total	Rank	Speed		Boulder		Lead			Total	Rank
Athlete	Event	Best	Place	Result	Place	Hold	Time	Place	Total	Rank	Best	Place	Result	Place	Hold	Time	Place	Total	Rank
Nathaniel Coleman	Men's	6.21	6	1T3z 4 6	11	39	—	5	550.00	8 Q	1	1	2T3z 4 4	1	34+	—	5	30	2nd place, silver medalist(s)
Colin Duffy	Men's	6.23	6	2T2z 17 12	5	42+	4:44	2	60.00	3 Q	6.35	5	1T3z 1 5	4	40	—	3	60	7
Kyra Condie	Women's	8.08	7	1T3z 4 5	11	22+	—	11	847.00	11	Did not advance								
Brooke Raboutou	Women's	8.67	12	3T4z 4 4	2	26+	3:40	8	192.00	5 Q	8.77	7	0T3z 0 10	2	20+	—	6	84	5

== Surfing ==
U.S. surfers qualified for the following spots to compete in surfing. California native Kolohe Andino, two-time men's world champion John John Florence, four-time women's world champion Carissa Moore, and 17-year-old Caroline Marks finished within the top ten (for men) and top eight (for women) of those eligible for qualification in the World Surf League rankings to secure their spots on the U.S. roster for Tokyo 2020.

One of the most dominant surfers of the generation John John Florence finished without a medal.

Athlete	Event	Round 1		Round 2		Round 3	Quarterfinal	Semifinal	Final / BM	
Athlete	Event	Score	Rank	Score	Rank	Opposition Result	Opposition Result	Opposition Result	Opposition Result	Rank
Kolohe Andino	Men's shortboard	10.27	2 Q	Bye		Florence (USA); W 14.83–11.60	Igarashi (JPN); L 11.00–12.60	Did not advance		=5
John John Florence	Men's shortboard	8.37	3 q	12.77	1 Q	Andino (USA); L 11.60–14.83	Did not advance			=9
Caroline Marks	Women's shortboard	13.40	1 Q	Bye		Maeda (JPN); W 15.33–7.74	Hennessy (CRC); W 12.50–6.83	Buitendag (RSA); L 3.67–11.00	Tsuzuki (JPN); L 4.26–6.80	4
Carissa Moore	Women's shortboard	11.74	1 Q	Bye		Mulánovich (PER); W 10.34–9.90	Lima (BRA); W 14.26–8.30	Tsuzuki (JPN); W 8.33–7.43	Buitendag (RSA); W 14.93–8.46	1st place, gold medalist(s)

== Swimming ==
U.S. swimmers achieved qualifying standards in the following events (up to a maximum of 2 swimmers in each event at the Olympic Qualifying Time (OQT), and potentially 1 at the Olympic Selection Time (OST)). To assure their selection to the U.S. team, swimmers had to finish in the top two of each individual pool event under the Olympic qualifying cut at the 2020 United States Olympic Trials (June 13 to 20, 2021) in Omaha, Nebraska.

The U.S. topped the medal count in swimming with 11 gold medals and 30 total medals. Caeleb Dressel won three individual golds and two relay golds; he won the most medals of any U.S. athlete at these Games. Katie Ledecky was defending 200m, 400m, and 800m titles, as well trying to win a newly introduced 1500m race where she held a world record. At the 2020 Games, Ledecky won two gold medals in 800m and 1500m and a silver in 400m; she also won a relay silver. Lilly King was defending her 100m breaststroke gold medal, as well as entering as the 2019 world champion in that event, and won the bronze medal; she also won silver in the 200m breastroke and a relay silver. Ryan Murphy was defending his gold medals in 100m and 200m backstroke (where he also held a world record) and ended up winning a silver and a bronze; he also won a relay gold.

Men

Athlete	Event	Heat		Semifinal		Final	
Athlete	Event	Time	Rank	Time	Rank	Time	Rank
Michael Andrew	50 m freestyle	21.89	11 Q	21.67	=5 Q	21.60	4
Caeleb Dressel	50 m freestyle	21.32	1 Q	21.42	1 Q	21.07 OR	1st place, gold medalist(s)
Zach Apple	100 m freestyle	48.16	11 Q	48.04	11	Did not advance	
Caeleb Dressel	100 m freestyle	47.73	2 Q	47.23	2 Q	47.02 OR	1st place, gold medalist(s)
Townley Haas	200 m freestyle	1:45.86	10 Q	1:46.07	12	Did not advance	
Kieran Smith	200 m freestyle	1:46.20	13 Q	1:45.07	2 Q	1:45.12	6
Jake Mitchell	400 m freestyle	3:45.38	7 Q	—N/a		3:45.39	8
Kieran Smith	400 m freestyle	3:45.25	6 Q	—N/a		3:43.94	3rd place, bronze medalist(s)
Michael Brinegar	800 m freestyle	7:53.00	17	—N/a		Did not advance	
Bobby Finke	800 m freestyle	7:42.72	3 Q	—N/a		7:41.87	1st place, gold medalist(s)
Michael Brinegar	1500 m freestyle	15:04.67	17	—N/a		Did not advance	
Bobby Finke	1500 m freestyle	14:47.20	2 Q	—N/a		14:39.65	1st place, gold medalist(s)
Hunter Armstrong	100 m backstroke	53.77	=15 Q	53.21	=9	Did not advance	
Ryan Murphy	100 m backstroke	53.22	=7 Q	52.24	1 Q	52.19	3rd place, bronze medalist(s)
Bryce Mefford	200 m backstroke	1:56.37	3 Q	1:56.37	6 Q	1:55.49	4
Ryan Murphy	200 m backstroke	1:56.92	7 Q	1:55.38	3 Q	1:54.15	2nd place, silver medalist(s)
Michael Andrew	100 m breaststroke	58.62	3 Q	58.99	5 Q	58.84	4
Andrew Wilson	100 m breaststroke	59.03	7 Q	59.18	8 Q	58.99	6
Nic Fink	200 m breaststroke	2:08.48	4 Q	2:08.00	4 Q	2:07.93	5
Andrew Wilson	200 m breaststroke	2:09.97	17	Did not advance			
Caeleb Dressel	100 m butterfly	50.39	1 Q	49.71 OR	1 Q	49.45 WR	1st place, gold medalist(s)
Tom Shields	100 m butterfly	51.57	=12 Q	51.99	15	Did not advance	
Gunnar Bentz	200 m butterfly	1:55.46	11 Q	1:55.28	6 Q	1:55.46	7
Zach Harting	200 m butterfly	1:54.92	4 Q	1:55.35	9	Did not advance	
Michael Andrew	200 m individual medley	1:56.40	1 Q	1:57.08	4 Q	1:57.31	5
Chase Kalisz	200 m individual medley	1:57.38	4 Q	1:58.03	12	Did not advance	
Chase Kalisz	400 m individual medley	4:09.65	3 Q	—N/a		4:09.42	1st place, gold medalist(s)
Jay Litherland	400 m individual medley	4:09.91	5 Q	—N/a		4:10.28	2nd place, silver medalist(s)
Zach Apple; Bowe Becker; Brooks Curry^{[d]} Caeleb Dressel; Blake Pieroni	4 × 100 m freestyle relay	3:11.33	2 Q	—N/a		3:08.97	1st place, gold medalist(s)
Zach Apple; Patrick Callan^{[d]} Townley Haas; Drew Kibler; Blake Pieroni^{[d]} Andrew Seliskar^{[d]} Kieran Smith	4 × 200 m freestyle relay	7:05.62	5 Q	—N/a		7:02.43	4
Michael Andrew; Zach Apple; Hunter Armstrong^{[d]} Caeleb Dressel; Ryan Murphy; Blake Pieroni^{[d]} Tom Shields^{[d]} Andrew Wilson^{[d]}	4 × 100 m medley relay	3:32.29	7 Q	—N/a		3:26.78 WR	1st place, gold medalist(s)
Jordan Wilimovsky	10 km open water	—N/a				1:51:40.2	10

Women

Athlete	Event	Heat		Semifinal		Final	
Athlete	Event	Time	Rank	Time	Rank	Time	Rank
Simone Manuel	50 m freestyle	24.65	=11 Q	24.63	=11	Did not advance	
Abbey Weitzeil	50 m freestyle	24.37	7 Q	24.19	4 Q	24.41	8
Erika Brown	100 m freestyle	53.87	=18 Q	53.58	13	Did not advance	
Abbey Weitzeil	100 m freestyle	53.21	11 Q	52.99	7 Q	53.23	8
Katie Ledecky	200 m freestyle	1:55.28	1 Q	1:55.34	3 Q	1:55.21	5
Allison Schmitt	200 m freestyle	1:57.10	12 Q	1:56.87	10	Did not advance	
Katie Ledecky	400 m freestyle	4:00.45	1 Q	—N/a		3:57.36	2nd place, silver medalist(s)
Paige Madden	400 m freestyle	4:03.98	7 Q	—N/a		4:06.81	7
Katie Grimes	800 m freestyle	8:17.05	2 Q	—N/a		8:19.38	4
Katie Ledecky	800 m freestyle	8:15.67	1 Q	—N/a		8:12.57	1st place, gold medalist(s)
Katie Ledecky	1500 m freestyle	15:35.35 OR	1 Q	—N/a		15:37.34	1st place, gold medalist(s)
Erica Sullivan	1500 m freestyle	15:46.67	3 Q	—N/a		15:41.41	2nd place, silver medalist(s)
Regan Smith	100 m backstroke	57.96	2 Q	57.86 OR	1 Q	58.05	3rd place, bronze medalist(s)
Rhyan White	100 m backstroke	59.02	6 Q	58.46	4 Q	58.43	4
Phoebe Bacon	200 m backstroke	2:08.30	4 Q	2:07.10	2 Q	2:06.40	5
Rhyan White	200 m backstroke	2:08.23	=2 Q	2:07.28	3 Q	2:06.39	4
Lydia Jacoby	100 m breaststroke	1:05.52	2 Q	1:05.72	3 Q	1:04.95	1st place, gold medalist(s)
Lilly King	100 m breaststroke	1:05.55	3 Q	1:05.40	2 Q	1:05.54	3rd place, bronze medalist(s)
Lilly King	200 m breaststroke	2:22.10	2 Q	2:22.27	5 Q	2:19.92	2nd place, silver medalist(s)
Annie Lazor	200 m breaststroke	2:22.76	5 Q	2:21.94	3 Q	2:20.84	3rd place, bronze medalist(s)
Claire Curzan	100 m butterfly	56.43	10 Q	57.42	10	Did not advance	
Torri Huske	100 m butterfly	56.29	4 Q	56.51	5 Q	55.73	4
Hali Flickinger	200 m butterfly	2:08.31	2 Q	2:06.23	2 Q	2:05.65	3rd place, bronze medalist(s)
Regan Smith	200 m butterfly	2:08.46	4 Q	2:06.44	4 Q	2:05.30	2nd place, silver medalist(s)
Kate Douglass	200 m individual medley	2:09.16	1 Q	2:09.21	1 Q	2:09.04	3rd place, bronze medalist(s)
Alexandra Walsh	200 m individual medley	2:09.94	=3 Q	2:09.57	3 Q	2:08.65	2nd place, silver medalist(s)
Hali Flickinger	400 m individual medley	4:35.98	5 Q	—N/a		4:34.90	3rd place, bronze medalist(s)
Emma Weyant	400 m individual medley	4:33.55	1 Q	—N/a		4:32.78	2nd place, silver medalist(s)
Erika Brown; Catie DeLoof^{[d]} Natalie Hinds; Simone Manuel; Allison Schmitt^{[d]} Olivia Smoliga^{[d]} Abbey Weitzeil	4 × 100 m freestyle relay	3:34.80	5 Q	—N/a		3:32.81	3rd place, bronze medalist(s)
Brooke Forde^{[d]} Katie Ledecky; Paige Madden; Katie McLaughlin; Allison Schmitt; Bella Sims^{[d]}	4 × 200 m freestyle relay	7:47.57	2 Q	—N/a		7:40.73 AM	2nd place, silver medalist(s)
Erika Brown^{[d]} Claire Curzan^{[d]} Torri Huske; Lydia Jacoby; Lilly King^{[d]} Regan Smith; Abbey Weitzeil; Rhyan White^{[d]}	4 × 100 m medley relay	3:55.18	2 Q	—N/a		3:51.73	2nd place, silver medalist(s)
Haley Anderson	10 km open water	—N/a				1:59:36.9	6
Ashley Twichell	10 km open water	—N/a				1:59:37.9	7

Mixed

Athlete	Event	Heat		Final	
Athlete	Event	Time	Rank	Time	Rank
Caeleb Dressel; Torri Huske; Lydia Jacoby; Ryan Murphy; Tom Shields^{[d]} Regan Smith^{[d]} Abbey Weitzeil^{[d]} Andrew Wilson^{[d]}	4 × 100 m medley relay	3:41.02	2 Q	3:40.58	5

^{d} Swimmers who participated in the heats only.

== Table tennis ==
Six U.S. athletes were entered into the table tennis competition at the Games. The men's and women's teams secured their respective Olympic berths by winning the gold medal each at the ITTF North America Qualification Tournament in Rockford, Illinois, United States, permitting a maximum of two starters to compete each in the men's and women's singles tournament.

Ranked as the top American each by gender in the ITTF world rankings before the cutoff, Rio 2016 Olympian Kanak Jha and two-time Olympian Lily Zhang were named to the U.S. Olympic team on February 4, 2020. The remaining table tennis players were selected at the Olympic Team Trials in Santa Monica, California on March 1, 2020.

Athlete	Event	Preliminary	Round 1	Round 2	Round 3	Round of 16	Quarterfinals	Semifinals	Final / BM	
Athlete	Event	Opposition Result	Opposition Result	Opposition Result	Opposition Result	Opposition Result	Opposition Result	Opposition Result	Opposition Result	Rank
Kanak Jha	Men's singles	Bye		Skachkov (ROC); L 2–4	Did not advance					
Nikhil Kumar	Men's singles	Enkhbatyn (MGL); W 4–1	Miño (ECU); W 4–2	Källberg (SWE); L 0–4	Did not advance					
Kanak Jha; Nikhil Kumar; Zhou Xin	Men's team	—N/a				Sweden; L 1–3	Did not advance			
Juan Liu	Women's singles	Oshonaike (NGR); W 4–1	Dvorak (ESP); W 4–1	Balážová (SVK); W 4–0	Szőcs (ROU); W 4–2	Yu (SGP); L 2–4	Did not advance			
Lily Zhang	Women's singles	Bye		Edem (NGR); W 4–1	Chen (TPE); L 0–4	Did not advance				
Juan Liu; Wang Huijing; Lily Zhang	Women's team	—N/a				Chinese Taipei; L 0–3	Did not advance			

== Taekwondo ==
Two U.S. athletes were entered into the taekwondo competition at the Games. With the Grand Slam winner already qualified through the WT Olympic Rankings, London 2012 bronze medalist Paige McPherson secured a spot in the women's welterweight category (67 kg), as the next highest-ranked eligible taekwondo practitioner. Meanwhile, 2018 Youth Olympic silver medalist Anastasija Zolotic scored a semifinal victory in the women's lightweight category (57 kg) to book the remaining spot on the U.S. taekwondo squad at the 2020 Pan American Qualification Tournament in San José, Costa Rica.

American teenager Anastasija Zolotic scored an upset victory over the Russian Olympic Committee's Tatiana Minina in the 57 kg to win the first ever gold medal for the United States in women's taekwondo.

Athlete	Event	Qualification	Round of 16	Quarterfinals	Semifinals	Repechage	Final / BM	
Athlete	Event	Opposition Result	Opposition Result	Opposition Result	Opposition Result	Opposition Result	Opposition Result	Rank
Anastasija Zolotic	Women's −57 kg	Bye	Laaraj (MAR); W 11–4	İlgün (TUR); W 17–9	Lo (TPE); W 28–5 PTG	Bye	Minina (ROC); W 25–17	1st place, gold medalist(s)
Paige McPherson	Women's −67 kg	—N/a	Azizova (AZE); W 8–5	Tatar (TUR); W 3–1 SDP	Jelić (CRO); L 4–15	Bye	Wahba (EGY); L 6–17	5

== Tennis ==
The United States entered eight tennis players (four men and four women) into the Olympic tournament. Rookies Tommy Paul (world no. 50), Frances Tiafoe (world no. 65), Tennys Sandgren (world no. 68), and Marcos Giron (world no. 75) were selected as four eligible players in the ATP world rankings of June 14, 2021, after top ranked American players Reilly Opelka, John Isner, and Taylor Fritz declined their participation. Four-time gold medalist Serena Williams (world no. 8) and rookie Sofia Kenin (world no. 4) were initially to participate but chose to withdraw from the tournament for personal reasons. Jennifer Brady (world no. 14), Coco Gauff (world no. 23), Jessica Pegula (world no. 26), and Alison Riske (world no. 31) were selected for the women's singles as four of the top 58 eligible players based on their WTA world rankings of June 14, 2021.

Having been entered into the men's singles, Sandgren and Tiafoe opted to play into men's doubles with their respective partners Austin Krajicek and Rajeev Ram, while Gauff and Pegula, already entered into the women's singles, partnered with Nicole Melichar and Bethanie Mattek-Sands, respectively. Gauff subsequently tested positive for COVID-19 and had to withdraw from the games. The U.S. could not replace her in the singles due to ITF rules. In the doubles, Melichar partnered with Riske instead of Gauff.

In tennis, the withdrawals of all top-ranked U.S. players left the Americans under-strength (they had a total of 11 withdrawals). They won no medals in an Olympic tennis tournament for the first time in history.

Men

Athlete	Event	Round of 64	Round of 32	Round of 16	Quarterfinals	Semifinals	Final / BM	
Athlete	Event	Opposition Score	Opposition Score	Opposition Score	Opposition Score	Opposition Score	Opposition Score	Rank
Marcos Giron	Singles	Gombos (SVK); W 7–6^{(7–4)}, 3–6, 6–2	Nishikori (JPN); L 6–7^{(5–7)}, 6–3, 1–6	Did not advance				
Tommy Paul	Singles	Karatsev (ROC); L 3–6, 2–6	Did not advance					
Tennys Sandgren	Singles	Carreño (ESP); L 5–7, 2–6	Did not advance					
Frances Tiafoe	Singles	Kwon (KOR); W 6–3, 6–2	Tsitsipas (GRE); L 3–6, 4–6	Did not advance				
Austin Krajicek; Tennys Sandgren	Doubles	—N/a	Peers / Purcell (AUS); W 3–6, 7–6^{(7–5)}, [10–5]	Klein / Polášek (SVK); W 6–7^{(2–7)}, 6–2, [10–5]	Struff / Zverev (GER); W 6–3, 7–6^{(7–4)}	Mektić / Pavić (CRO); L 4–6, 4–6	Daniell / Venus (NZL); L 6–7^{(3–7)}, 2–6	4
Rajeev Ram; Frances Tiafoe	Doubles	—N/a	Khachanov / Rublev (ROC); W 6–7^{(3–7)}, 7–6^{(7–5)}, [12–10]	Čilić / Dodig (CRO); L 3–6, 5–7	Did not advance			

Women

Athlete	Event	Round of 64	Round of 32	Round of 16	Quarterfinals	Semifinals	Final / BM	
Athlete	Event	Opposition Score	Opposition Score	Opposition Score	Opposition Score	Opposition Score	Opposition Score	Rank
Jennifer Brady	Singles	Giorgi (ITA); L 3–6, 2–6	Did not advance					
Jessica Pegula	Singles	Bencic (SUI); L 3–6, 3–6	Did not advance					
Alison Riske	Singles	Buzărnescu (ROU); L 7–6^{(7–0)}, 5–7, 4–6	Did not advance					
Bethanie Mattek-Sands; Jessica Pegula	Doubles	—N/a	Linette / Rosolska (POL); W 6–1, 6–3	Cornet / Ferro (FRA); W 6–1, 6–4	Pigossi / Stefani (BRA); L 6–1, 3–6, [6–10]	Did not advance		
Nicole Melichar; Alison Riske	Doubles	—N/a	Errani / Paolini (ITA); L 3–6, 7–5, [2–10]	Did not advance				

Mixed

Athlete	Event	Round of 16	Quarterfinals	Semifinals	Final / BM	
Athlete	Event	Opposition Score	Opposition Score	Opposition Score	Opposition Score	Rank
Bethanie Mattek-Sands; Rajeev Ram	Doubles	Siegemund / Krawietz (GER); L 4–6, 7–5, [8–10]	Did not advance			

== Triathlon ==
The U.S. qualified five quota places in the triathlon events for Tokyo.

In women's triathlon, 2019 world champion Katie Zaferes won bronze.

Individual

Athlete	Event	Time						Rank
Athlete	Event	Swim (1.5 km)	Trans 1	Bike (40 km)	Trans 2	Run (10 km)	Total	Rank
Kevin McDowell	Men's	18:29	0:37	55:56	0:28	30:24	1:45:54	6
Morgan Pearson	Men's	18:02	0:38	58:17	0:36	34:32	1:52:05	42
Taylor Knibb	Women's	19:52	0:45	1:04:42	0:34	35:06	2:00:59	16
Summer Rappaport	Women's	18:29	0:41	1:03:58	0:36	36:35	2:00:19	14
Katie Zaferes	Women's	18:28	0:43	1:02:51	0:34	34:27	1:57:03	3rd place, bronze medalist(s)

Relay

Athlete	Event	Time						Rank
Athlete	Event	Swim (300 m)	Trans 1	Bike (7 km)	Trans 2	Run (2 km)	Total	Rank
Taylor Knibb	Mixed relay	4:37	0:39	10:01	0:32	6:17	22:06	—N/a
Kevin McDowell	Mixed relay	4:02	0:37	9:35	0:28	5:32	20:14	—N/a
Morgan Pearson	Mixed relay	4:04	0:37	9:38	0:29	5:33	20:21	—N/a
Katie Zaferes	Mixed relay	3:45	0:38	10:12	0:30	6:09	21:14	—N/a
Total	Mixed relay	—N/a					1:23:55	2nd place, silver medalist(s)

== Volleyball ==
In volleyball, the U.S. men's team did not advance to the knockout round, and the U.S. women's team won the gold medal. In beach volleyball, the top-ranked U.S. men's team was hit with a positive COVID-19 test from Taylor Crabb. He was replaced by Tri Bourne, forcing Jake Gibb to play with a new partner. The pair lost in the round of 16. In women's beach volleyball, the U.S. pair of Kelly Claes and Sarah Sponcil lost in the round of 16 due to controversial refereeing.

=== Beach ===
United States qualified four beach volleyball pairs at the Games, as the result in the FIVB Beach volleyball Olympic Ranking List of June 13, 2021.

Athlete	Event	Preliminary round				Repechage	Round of 16	Quarterfinals	Semifinals	Final / BM	
Athlete	Event	Opposition Score	Opposition Score	Opposition Score	Rank	Opposition Score	Opposition Score	Opposition Score	Opposition Score	Opposition Score	Rank
Tri Bourne; Jake Gibb	Men's	Carambula / Rossi (ITA); W (21–18, 21–19)	Gerson / Heidrich (SUI); W (21–19, 23–21)	Ahmed / Cherif (QAT); L (18–21, 17–21)	2 Q	Bye	Thole - Wickler (GER); L (21–17, 15–21, 11–15)	Did not advance			
Phil Dalhausser; Nick Lucena	Men's	Brouwer / Meeuwsen (NED); L (17–21, 18–21)	Alison / Álvaro (BRA); W (24–22, 19–21, 15–13)	Azaad / Capogrosso (ARG); W (21–19, 18–21, 15–6)	3 Q	Bye	Ahmed / Cherif (QAT); L (21–14, 19–21, 11–15)	Did not advance			
Kelly Claes; Sarah Sponcil	Women's	Graudiņa / Kravčenoka (LAT); W (21–13, 16–21, 15–11)	Khadambi / Makokha (KEN); W (21–8, 21–6)	Ana Patrícia / Rebecca (BRA); W(17–21, 21–19, 15–11)	1 Q	Bye	Bansley / Wilkerson (CAN); L (24–22, 18–21, 13–15)	Did not advance			
Alix Klineman; April Ross	Women's	Wang Xx / Xue (CHN); W (21–17, 21–19)	Baquerizo / Fernández (ESP); W (21–13, 21–16)	Keizer / Meppelink (NED); W (20–22, 21–17, 15–5)	1 Q	Bye	Echevarría / Martínez (CUB); W (21–17, 21–15)	Kozuch / Ludwig (GER); W (21–19, 21–19)	Heidrich / Vergé-Dépré (SUI); W (21–12, 21–11)	Artacho / Clancy (AUS); W (21–15, 21–16)	1st place, gold medalist(s)

=== Indoor ===
Summary

Team	Event	Group stage						Quarterfinal	Semifinal	Final / BM	
Team	Event	Opposition Score	Opposition Score	Opposition Score	Opposition Score	Opposition Score	Rank	Opposition Score	Opposition Score	Opposition Score	Rank
United States men's	Men's tournament	France; W 3–0	ROC; L 1–3	Tunisia; W 3–1	Brazil; L 1–3	Argentina; L 0–3	5	Did not advance			=9
United States women's	Women's tournament	Argentina; W 3–0	China; W 3–0	Turkey; W 3–2	ROC; L 0–3	Italy; W 3–2	1 Q	Dominican Republic; W 3–0	Serbia; W 3–0	Brazil; W 3–0	1st place, gold medalist(s)

==== Men's tournament ====
The U.S. men's volleyball team qualified for the Olympics by securing an outright berth as the highest-ranked nation for pool B at the Intercontinental Olympic Qualification Tournament in Rotterdam, Netherlands.

Team roster
The United States roster was announced on 14 June 2021.

Head coach: (United States) John Speraw

- 1 Matt Anderson OP
- 3 Taylor Sander OH
- 5 Kyle Ensing OP
- 6 Mitch Stahl MB
- 7 Kawika Shoji S
- 8 TJ DeFalco OH
- 11 Micah Christenson (c) S
- 12 Maxwell Holt MB
- 17 Thomas Jaeschke OH
- 18 Garrett Muagututia OH
- 20 David Smith MB
- 22 Erik Shoji L

Group play

Pos	Team	Pld	W	L	Pts	SW	SL	SR	SPW	SPL	SPR	Qualification
1	ROC	5	4	1	12	13	5	2.600	427	397	1.076	Quarterfinals
2	Brazil	5	4	1	10	12	8	1.500	476	450	1.058	Quarterfinals
3	Argentina	5	3	2	8	12	10	1.200	476	464	1.026	Quarterfinals
4	France	5	2	3	8	10	10	1.000	449	442	1.016	Quarterfinals
5	United States	5	2	3	6	8	10	0.800	432	412	1.049	
6	Tunisia	5	0	5	1	3	15	0.200	339	434	0.781	

Source: Tokyo 2020 and FIVB
Rules for classification: Tiebreakers

24 July 2021; 23:00 v	United States	3–0	France	Ariake Arena, Tokyo; Referees: Wojciech Maroszek (POL), Hernán Casamiquela (ARG)
24 July 2021; 23:00 v	(25–18, 25–18, 25–22); Results Statistics			Ariake Arena, Tokyo; Referees: Wojciech Maroszek (POL), Hernán Casamiquela (ARG)

26 July 2021; 11:05 v	United States	1–3	ROC	Ariake Arena, Tokyo; Referees: Juraj Mokrý (SVK), Liu Jiang (CHN)
26 July 2021; 11:05 v	(23–25, 25–27, 25–21, 23–25); Results Statistics			Ariake Arena, Tokyo; Referees: Juraj Mokrý (SVK), Liu Jiang (CHN)

28 July 2021; 11:05 v	United States	3–1	Tunisia	Ariake Arena, Tokyo; Referees: Evgeny Makshanov (RUS), Sumie Myoi (JPN)
28 July 2021; 11:05 v	(25–14, 23–25, 25–14, 25–23); Results Statistics			Ariake Arena, Tokyo; Referees: Evgeny Makshanov (RUS), Sumie Myoi (JPN)

30 July 2021; 11:05 v	Brazil	3–1	United States	Ariake Arena, Tokyo; Referees: Daniele Rapisarda (ITA), Luis Macias (MEX)
30 July 2021; 11:05 v	(30–32, 25–23, 25–21, 25–20); Results Statistics			Ariake Arena, Tokyo; Referees: Daniele Rapisarda (ITA), Luis Macias (MEX)

1 August 2021; 23:00 v	United States	0–3	Argentina	Ariake Arena, Tokyo; Referees: Denny Cespedes (DOM), Vladimir Simonović (SRB)
1 August 2021; 23:00 v	(21–25, 23–25, 23–25); Results Statistics			Ariake Arena, Tokyo; Referees: Denny Cespedes (DOM), Vladimir Simonović (SRB)

==== Women's tournament ====
The U.S. women's volleyball team qualified for the Olympics by securing an outright berth as the highest-ranked nation for pool C at the Intercontinental Olympic Qualification Tournament in Shreveport, Louisiana.

Team roster
The United States roster was announced on 7 June 2021.

Head coach: Karch Kiraly

- 1 Micha Hancock S
- 2 Jordyn Poulter S
- 4 Justine Wong-Orantes L
- 10 Jordan Larson (c) OS
- 11 Annie Drews OP
- 12 Jordan Thompson OP
- 14 Michelle Bartsch-Hackley OS
- 15 Kim Hill OS
- 16 Foluke Akinradewo MB
- 22 Haleigh Washington MB
- 23 Kelsey Robinson OS
- 24 Chiaka Ogbogu MB

Group play

Pos	Team	Pld	W	L	Pts	SW	SL	SR	SPW	SPL	SPR	Qualification
1	United States	5	4	1	10	12	7	1.714	418	401	1.042	Quarter-finals
2	Italy	5	3	2	10	11	7	1.571	409	377	1.085	Quarter-finals
3	Turkey	5	3	2	9	12	8	1.500	434	416	1.043	Quarter-finals
4	ROC	5	3	2	9	11	8	1.375	422	378	1.116	Quarter-finals
5	China	5	2	3	7	8	9	0.889	374	385	0.971	
6	Argentina	5	0	5	0	0	15	0.000	275	375	0.733	

Source: Tokyo 2020 and FIVB
Rules for classification: Tiebreakers

25 July 2021; 11:05	United States	3–0	Argentina	Ariake Arena, Tokyo; Referees: Sumie Myoi (JPN), Daniele Rapisarda (ITA)
25 July 2021; 11:05	(25–20, 25–19, 25–20); Results Statistics			Ariake Arena, Tokyo; Referees: Sumie Myoi (JPN), Daniele Rapisarda (ITA)

27 July 2021; 11:05	China	0–3	United States	Ariake Arena, Tokyo; Referees: Wojciech Maroszek (POL), Fabrice Collados (FRA)
27 July 2021; 11:05	(27–29, 22–25, 21–25); Results Statistics			Ariake Arena, Tokyo; Referees: Wojciech Maroszek (POL), Fabrice Collados (FRA)

29 July 2021; 21:45	United States	3–2	Turkey	Ariake Arena, Tokyo; Referees: Paulo Turci (BRA), Kang Joo-hee (KOR)
29 July 2021; 21:45	(25–19, 25–20, 17–25, 20–25, 15–12); ResultsStatistics			Ariake Arena, Tokyo; Referees: Paulo Turci (BRA), Kang Joo-hee (KOR)

31 July 2021; 11:05	United States	0–3	ROC	Ariake Arena, Tokyo; Referees: Vladimir Simonović (SRB), Hernán Casamiquela (ARG)
31 July 2021; 11:05	(20–25, 12–25, 19–25); Results Statistics			Ariake Arena, Tokyo; Referees: Vladimir Simonović (SRB), Hernán Casamiquela (ARG)

2 August 2021; 11:05	United States	3–2	Italy	Ariake Arena, Tokyo; Referees: Liu Jiang (CHN), Luis Macias (MEX)
2 August 2021; 11:05	(21–25, 25–16, 25–27, 25–16, 15–12); Results Statistics			Ariake Arena, Tokyo; Referees: Liu Jiang (CHN), Luis Macias (MEX)

Quarterfinal

4 August 2021; 13:00	Dominican Republic	0–3	United States	Ariake Arena, Tokyo; Referees: Luis Macias (MEX), Kang Joo-hee (KOR)
4 August 2021; 13:00	(11–25, 20–25, 19–25); Results Statistics			Ariake Arena, Tokyo; Referees: Luis Macias (MEX), Kang Joo-hee (KOR)

Semifinal

6 August 2021; 13:00	Serbia	0–3	United States	Ariake Arena, Tokyo; Referees: Hernán Casamiquela (ARG), Susana Rodríguez (ESP)
6 August 2021; 13:00	(19–25, 15–25, 23–25); Results Statistics			Ariake Arena, Tokyo; Referees: Hernán Casamiquela (ARG), Susana Rodríguez (ESP)

Gold medal match

8 August 2021; 13:30	Brazil	0–3	United States	Ariake Arena, Tokyo; Referees: Juraj Mokrý (SVK), Hernán Casamiquela (ARG)
8 August 2021; 13:30	(21–25, 20–25, 14–25); Results Statistics			Ariake Arena, Tokyo; Referees: Juraj Mokrý (SVK), Hernán Casamiquela (ARG)

== Water polo ==
In water polo, the U.S. men's team finished in sixth place, and the U.S. women's team won their third consecutive Olympic gold medal.

Summary

Key:
- FT – After full time.
- P – Match decided by penalty-shootout.

Team	Event	Group stage						Quarterfinal	Semifinal	Final / BM	
Team	Event	Opposition Score	Opposition Score	Opposition Score	Opposition Score	Opposition Score	Rank	Opposition Score	Opposition Score	Opposition Score	Rank
United States men's	Men's tournament	Japan; W 15–13	South Africa; W 20–3	Italy; L 11–12	Hungary; L 8–11	Greece; L 5–14	4 Q	Spain; L 8–12	Classification semifinal Italy; W 7–6	Fifth place final Croatia; L 11–14	6
United States women's	Women's tournament	Japan; W 25–4	China; W 12–7	Hungary; L 9–10	ROC; W 18–5	—N/a	1 Q	Canada; W 16–5	ROC; W 15–11	Spain; W 14–5	1st place, gold medalist(s)

=== Men's tournament ===
The United States men's national water polo team qualified for the Olympics by winning the gold medal and securing an outright berth at the 2019 Pan American Games in Lima, Peru.

Team roster
The United States' final squad was announced on 2 July 2021.

Head coach: (Serbia) Dejan Udovičić

No.	Player	Pos.	L/R	Height	Weight	Date of birth (age)	Apps	OG/ Goals	Club	Ref
1	Alex Wolf	GK	R	2.01 m (6 ft 7 in)	103 kg (227 lb)	19 April 1997 (aged 24)	61	0/0	(Greece) Hydraikos	
2	Johnny Hooper	D	R	1.88 m (6 ft 2 in)	88 kg (194 lb)	24 June 1997 (aged 24)	95	0/0	(Greece) Palaio Faliro	
3	Marko Vavic	D	R	1.98 m (6 ft 6 in)	103 kg (227 lb)	25 April 1999 (aged 22)	89	0/0	(Italy) Roma Nuoto	
4	Alex Obert	CF	R	1.96 m (6 ft 5 in)	105 kg (231 lb)	18 December 1991 (aged 29)	204	1/2	(Croatia) Jug Dubrovnik	
5	Hannes Daube	D	R	1.98 m (6 ft 6 in)	106 kg (234 lb)	5 January 2000 (aged 21)	78	0/0	(Greece) Olympiacos	
6	Luca Cupido	D	R	1.91 m (6 ft 3 in)	97 kg (214 lb)	9 November 1995 (aged 25)	139	1/4	(Italy) Camogli	
7	Ben Hallock	CF	R	1.98 m (6 ft 6 in)	115 kg (254 lb)	22 November 1997 (aged 23)	128	1/0	(Italy) Pro Recco	
8	Dylan Woodhead	CB	R	2.01 m (6 ft 7 in)	100 kg (220 lb)	25 September 1998 (aged 22)	40	0/0	(Greece) Glyfada	
9	Alex Bowen	D	R	1.96 m (6 ft 5 in)	106 kg (234 lb)	4 September 1993 (aged 27)	212	1/3	(Greece) Apollon Smyrnis	
10	Ben Stevenson	D	R	1.93 m (6 ft 4 in)	87 kg (192 lb)	16 March 1995 (aged 26)	38	0/0	(Greece) Glyfada	
11	Jesse Smith (C)	CB	R	1.93 m (6 ft 4 in)	112 kg (247 lb)	27 April 1983 (aged 38)	455	4/16	(United States) NYAC	
12	Max Irving	D	R	1.85 m (6 ft 1 in)	81 kg (179 lb)	21 May 1995 (aged 26)	98	0/0	(Greece) Olympiacos	
13	Drew Holland	GK	R	1.96 m (6 ft 5 in)	83 kg (183 lb)	11 April 1995 (aged 26)	53	0/0	(Greece) Chios	
Average				1.95 m (6 ft 5 in)	99 kg (218 lb)	26 years, 24 days	130			

Note: Age as of 23 July 2021
Source: United States Men | Tokyo 2020 Olympics Archived 2021-07-22 at the Wayback Machine

Group play

Pos	Team	Pld	W	D	L	GF	GA	GD	Pts	Qualification
1	Greece	5	4	1	0	68	34	+34	9	Quarterfinals
2	Italy	5	3	2	0	60	32	+28	8	Quarterfinals
3	Hungary	5	3	1	1	64	35	+29	7	Quarterfinals
4	United States	5	2	0	3	59	53	+6	4	Quarterfinals
5	Japan (H)	5	1	0	4	65	66	−1	2	
6	South Africa	5	0	0	5	20	116	−96	0	

Source: Tokyo 2020 and FINA
Rules for classification: 1) Points; 2) Head-to-head points; 3) Head-to-head goal difference; 4) Head-to-head goals scored; 5) Goal difference.
(H) Hosts

25 July 2021; 14:00 v	Report	United States	15–13	Japan	Tokyo Tatsumi International Swimming Center; Referees: Sébastien Dervieux (FRA), Arkadiy Voevodin (RUS)
25 July 2021; 14:00 v	Report	Score by quarters: 3–3, 4–5, 4–2, 4–3			Tokyo Tatsumi International Swimming Center; Referees: Sébastien Dervieux (FRA), Arkadiy Voevodin (RUS)
25 July 2021; 14:00 v	Report	Bowen 5	Goals	three players 3	Tokyo Tatsumi International Swimming Center; Referees: Sébastien Dervieux (FRA), Arkadiy Voevodin (RUS)

27 July 2021; 10:00 v	Report	South Africa	3–20	United States	Tokyo Tatsumi International Swimming Center; Referees: Zhang Liang (CHN), Vojin Putniković (SRB)
27 July 2021; 10:00 v	Report	Score by quarters: 0–3, 1–9, 1–3, 1–5			Tokyo Tatsumi International Swimming Center; Referees: Zhang Liang (CHN), Vojin Putniković (SRB)
27 July 2021; 10:00 v	Report	three players 1	Goals	Hallock 4	Tokyo Tatsumi International Swimming Center; Referees: Zhang Liang (CHN), Vojin Putniković (SRB)

29 July 2021; 14:00 v	Report	United States	11–12	Italy	Tokyo Tatsumi International Swimming Center; Referees: Sébastien Dervieux (FRA), Nenad Periš (CRO)
29 July 2021; 14:00 v	Report	Score by quarters: 4–2, 3–3, 2–3, 2–4			Tokyo Tatsumi International Swimming Center; Referees: Sébastien Dervieux (FRA), Nenad Periš (CRO)
29 July 2021; 14:00 v	Report	four players 2	Goals	Di Fulvio 5	Tokyo Tatsumi International Swimming Center; Referees: Sébastien Dervieux (FRA), Nenad Periš (CRO)

31 July 2021; 14:00 v	Report	United States	8–11	Hungary	Tokyo Tatsumi International Swimming Center; Referees: Xevi Buch (ESP), Arkadiy Voevodin (RUS)
31 July 2021; 14:00 v	Report	Score by quarters: 1–2, 3–3, 0–3, 4–3			Tokyo Tatsumi International Swimming Center; Referees: Xevi Buch (ESP), Arkadiy Voevodin (RUS)
31 July 2021; 14:00 v	Report	Bowen, Hallock 2	Goals	Manhercz 3	Tokyo Tatsumi International Swimming Center; Referees: Xevi Buch (ESP), Arkadiy Voevodin (RUS)

2 August 2021; 11:30 v	Report	Greece	14–5	United States	Tokyo Tatsumi International Swimming Center; Referees: Adrian Alexandrescu (ROU), Michiel Zwart (NED)
2 August 2021; 11:30 v	Report	Score by quarters: 4–1, 2–2, 5–2, 3–0			Tokyo Tatsumi International Swimming Center; Referees: Adrian Alexandrescu (ROU), Michiel Zwart (NED)
2 August 2021; 11:30 v	Report	Genidounias 5	Goals	Obert 2	Tokyo Tatsumi International Swimming Center; Referees: Adrian Alexandrescu (ROU), Michiel Zwart (NED)

Quarterfinal

4 August 2021; 14:00 v	Report	United States	8–12	Spain	Tokyo Tatsumi International Swimming Center; Referees: Michiel Zwart (NED), György Kun (HUN)
4 August 2021; 14:00 v	Report	Score by quarters: 3–3, 3–3, 0–1, 2–5			Tokyo Tatsumi International Swimming Center; Referees: Michiel Zwart (NED), György Kun (HUN)
4 August 2021; 14:00 v	Report	Daube 3	Goals	four players 2	Tokyo Tatsumi International Swimming Center; Referees: Michiel Zwart (NED), György Kun (HUN)

Classification semifinal (5–8)

6 August 2021; 18:20 v	Report	Italy	6–7	United States	Tokyo Tatsumi International Swimming Center; Referees: Sébastien Dervieux (FRA), Xevi Buch (ESP)
6 August 2021; 18:20 v	Report	Score by quarters: 2–2, 1–3, 2–0, 1–2			Tokyo Tatsumi International Swimming Center; Referees: Sébastien Dervieux (FRA), Xevi Buch (ESP)
6 August 2021; 18:20 v	Report	Figlioli, Renzuto 2	Goals	Bowen 3	Tokyo Tatsumi International Swimming Center; Referees: Sébastien Dervieux (FRA), Xevi Buch (ESP)

Fifth place game

8 August 2021; 11:00 v	Report	Croatia	14–11	United States	Tokyo Tatsumi International Swimming Center; Referees: Alessandro Severo (ITA), György Kun (HUN)
8 August 2021; 11:00 v	Report	Score by quarters: 2–3, 4–2, 4–2, 4–4			Tokyo Tatsumi International Swimming Center; Referees: Alessandro Severo (ITA), György Kun (HUN)
8 August 2021; 11:00 v	Report	Bukić 3	Goals	five players 2	Tokyo Tatsumi International Swimming Center; Referees: Alessandro Severo (ITA), György Kun (HUN)

=== Women's tournament ===
The United States women's national water polo team qualified for the Olympics by winning the gold medal and securing an outright berth at the 2019 FINA Women's Water Polo World League in Budapest, Hungary.

Team roster
The United States' final squad was announced on 23 June 2021.

Head coach: Adam Krikorian

No.	Player	Pos.	L/R	Height	Weight	Date of birth (age)	Apps	OG/ Goals	Club	Ref
1	Ashleigh Johnson	GK	R	1.85 m (6 ft 1 in)	81 kg (179 lb)	12 September 1994 (aged 26)	134	1/0	(United States) NYAC	
2	Maddie Musselman	D	R	1.80 m (5 ft 11 in)	65 kg (143 lb)	16 June 1998 (aged 23)	188	1/12	(United States) NYAC	
3	Melissa Seidemann	CF	R	1.83 m (6 ft 0 in)	104 kg (229 lb)	26 June 1990 (aged 31)	320	2/7	(United States) NYAC	
4	Rachel Fattal	D	R	1.73 m (5 ft 8 in)	65 kg (143 lb)	10 December 1993 (aged 27)	224	1/4	(United States) NYAC	
5	Paige Hauschild	D	R	1.80 m (5 ft 11 in)		17 August 1999 (aged 21)	100	0/0	(United States) Santa Barbara 805	
6	Maggie Steffens (C)	D	R	1.73 m (5 ft 8 in)	74 kg (163 lb)	4 June 1993 (aged 28)	318	2/38	(United States) NYAC	
7	Stephania Haralabidis	D	L	1.80 m (5 ft 11 in)		19 May 1995 (aged 26)	78	0/0	(United States) NYAC	
8	Jamie Neushul	D	R	1.68 m (5 ft 6 in)		12 May 1995 (aged 26)	105	0/0	(United States) NYAC	
9	Aria Fischer	CF	R	1.83 m (6 ft 0 in)	78 kg (172 lb)	2 March 1999 (aged 22)	158	1/0	(United States) SET	
10	Kaleigh Gilchrist	D	R	1.75 m (5 ft 9 in)	77 kg (170 lb)	16 May 1992 (aged 29)	201	1/6	(United States) NYAC	
11	Makenzie Fischer	CB	R	1.85 m (6 ft 1 in)	74 kg (163 lb)	29 March 1997 (aged 24)	208	1/7	(United States) SET	
12	Alys Williams	CB	R	1.80 m (5 ft 11 in)		28 May 1994 (aged 27)	178	0/0	(United States) NYAC	
13	Amanda Longan	GK	R	1.88 m (6 ft 2 in)		16 January 1997 (aged 24)	32	0/0	(United States) Santa Barbara 805	
Average				1.79 m (5 ft 10 in)	77 kg (170 lb)	26 years, 18 days	173			

Note: Age as of 23 July 2021
Source: United States Women | Tokyo 2020 Olympics Archived 2021-07-22 at the Wayback Machine

Group play

Pos	Team	Pld	W	D	L	GF	GA	GD	Pts	Qualification
1	United States	4	3	0	1	64	26	+38	6	Quarterfinals
2	Hungary	4	2	1	1	46	43	+3	5 (Note: ROC10–10 Hungary)	Quarterfinals
3	ROC	4	2	1	1	53	61	−8	5	Quarterfinals
4	China	4	2	0	2	51	50	+1	4	Quarterfinals
5	Japan (H)	4	0	0	4	44	78	−34	0	

Source: Tokyo 2020 and FINA
Rules for classification: 1) Points; 2) Head-to-head points; 3) Head-to-head goal difference; 4) Head-to-head goals scored; 5) Goal difference.
(H) Hosts
Notes:

24 July 2021; 14:00 v	Report	Japan	4–25	United States	Tokyo Tatsumi International Swimming Center; Referees: Germán Moller (ARG), Nicola Johnson (AUS)
24 July 2021; 14:00 v	Report	Score by quarters: 3–8, 0–6, 1–7, 0–4			Tokyo Tatsumi International Swimming Center; Referees: Germán Moller (ARG), Nicola Johnson (AUS)
24 July 2021; 14:00 v	Report	Koide 2	Goals	Haralabidis, Steffens 5	Tokyo Tatsumi International Swimming Center; Referees: Germán Moller (ARG), Nicola Johnson (AUS)

26 July 2021; 14:00 v	Report	United States	12–7	China	Tokyo Tatsumi International Swimming Center; Referees: Alessandro Severo (ITA), Dion Willis (RSA)
26 July 2021; 14:00 v	Report	Score by quarters: 4–4, 2–2, 3–0, 3–1			Tokyo Tatsumi International Swimming Center; Referees: Alessandro Severo (ITA), Dion Willis (RSA)
26 July 2021; 14:00 v	Report	M. Fischer 3	Goals	Wang, Zhang J. 2	Tokyo Tatsumi International Swimming Center; Referees: Alessandro Severo (ITA), Dion Willis (RSA)

28 July 2021; 14:00 v	Report	Hungary	10–9	United States	Tokyo Tatsumi International Swimming Center; Referees: Nenad Periš (CRO), Xevi Buch (ESP)
28 July 2021; 14:00 v	Report	Score by quarters: 2–2, 3–3, 1–3, 4–1			Tokyo Tatsumi International Swimming Center; Referees: Nenad Periš (CRO), Xevi Buch (ESP)
28 July 2021; 14:00 v	Report	Parkes 3	Goals	Musselman 3	Tokyo Tatsumi International Swimming Center; Referees: Nenad Periš (CRO), Xevi Buch (ESP)

30 July 2021; 15:30 v	Report	United States	18–5	ROC	Tokyo Tatsumi International Swimming Center; Referees: Alessandro Severo (ITA), Xevi Buch (ESP)
30 July 2021; 15:30 v	Report	Score by quarters: 5–1, 4–2, 6–1, 3–1			Tokyo Tatsumi International Swimming Center; Referees: Alessandro Severo (ITA), Xevi Buch (ESP)
30 July 2021; 15:30 v	Report	Haralabidis, Steffens 4	Goals	Simanovich 2	Tokyo Tatsumi International Swimming Center; Referees: Alessandro Severo (ITA), Xevi Buch (ESP)

Quarterfinal

3 August 2021; 14:00 v	Report	Canada	5–16	United States	Tokyo Tatsumi International Swimming Center; Referees: Asumi Tsuzaki (JPN), Georgios Stavridis (GRE)
3 August 2021; 14:00 v	Report	Score by quarters: 1–7, 2–4, 0–0, 2–5			Tokyo Tatsumi International Swimming Center; Referees: Asumi Tsuzaki (JPN), Georgios Stavridis (GRE)
3 August 2021; 14:00 v	Report	La Roche 2	Goals	three players 3	Tokyo Tatsumi International Swimming Center; Referees: Asumi Tsuzaki (JPN), Georgios Stavridis (GRE)

Semifinal

5 August 2021; 15:30 v	Report	ROC	11–15	United States	Tokyo Tatsumi International Swimming Center; Referees: Stanko Ivanovski (MNE), Dion Willis (RSA)
5 August 2021; 15:30 v	Report	Score by quarters: 3–2, 4–4, 2–5, 2–4			Tokyo Tatsumi International Swimming Center; Referees: Stanko Ivanovski (MNE), Dion Willis (RSA)
5 August 2021; 15:30 v	Report	Bersneva 3	Goals	Musselman 5	Tokyo Tatsumi International Swimming Center; Referees: Stanko Ivanovski (MNE), Dion Willis (RSA)

Gold medal game

7 August 2021; 16:30 v	Report	Spain	5–14	United States	Tokyo Tatsumi International Swimming Center; Referees: Nenad Periš (CRO), Sébastien Dervieux (FRA)
7 August 2021; 16:30 v	Report	Score by quarters: 1–4, 3–3, 0–5, 1–2			Tokyo Tatsumi International Swimming Center; Referees: Nenad Periš (CRO), Sébastien Dervieux (FRA)
7 August 2021; 16:30 v	Report	García 2	Goals	Musselman 3	Tokyo Tatsumi International Swimming Center; Referees: Nenad Periš (CRO), Sébastien Dervieux (FRA)

== Weightlifting ==
U.S. weightlifters qualified for eight quota places at the games, based on the Tokyo 2020 Rankings Qualification List of June 11, 2021.

In weightlifting, 2019 world champion Katherine Nye won silver.

Men

Athlete	Event	Snatch		Clean & jerk		Total	
Athlete	Event	Result	Rank	Result	Rank	Result	Rank
Clarence Cummings	−73 kg	145	11	180	8	325	9
Harrison Maurus	−81 kg	161	7	200	4	361	4
Wesley Kitts	−109 kg	177	8	213	8	390	8
Caine Wilkes	+109 kg	173	12	217	8	390	9

Women

Athlete	Event	Snatch		Clean & jerk		Total	
Athlete	Event	Result	Rank	Result	Rank	Result	Rank
Jourdan Delacruz	–49 kg	86	3	~~108~~	DNF	86	DNF
Katherine Nye	–76 kg	111	3	138	2	249	2nd place, silver medalist(s)
Mattie Rogers	–87 kg	108	6	138	6	246	6
Sarah Robles	+87 kg	128	2	154	3	282	3rd place, bronze medalist(s)

== Wrestling ==
The United States qualified fifteen wrestlers for each of the following classes into the Olympic competition. Four of them finished among the top six to book Olympic spots in the men's freestyle (74 and 97 kg) and women's freestyle (68 and 76 kg) at the 2019 World Championships, while eleven more licenses were awarded to U.S. wrestlers, who progressed to the top two finals at the 2020 Pan American Qualification Tournament in Ottawa, Canada.

To assure their selection to the U.S. Olympic team, wrestlers had to claim a top spot of each division at the 2020 Olympic Trials (April 2 to 3, 2021) in Dickies Arena, Texas. Among those selected to the team were reigning Olympic champions Kyle Snyder (men's freestyle 97 kg) and Helen Maroulis (women's freestyle 57 kg), five-time world champion Adeline Gray (women's freestyle 76 kg), Ildar Hafizov (men's Greco-Roman 60 kg), a Beijing 2008 Olympian from Uzbekistan who returned to the Games for the second time as an American citizen; and Kyle Dake (men's freestyle 74 kg), who defeated London 2012 champion Jordan Burroughs in the final match to earn the coveted spot in his Olympic debut.

In the women's freestyle wrestling, the United States sent its strongest ever team, after three gold medals at the 2019 World Wrestling Championships. Four-time and reigning world champion Adeline Gray lost in the final, getting silver. Another reigning world champion Tamyra Mensah-Stock became the second ever U.S. woman to take gold. The first one, Helen Maroulis, came to Tokyo to defend her gold medal but was narrowly defeated in the semi-final and proceeded to win the bronze medal bout. Another reigning world champion Jacarra Winchester lost in the quarter-finals, battled through the repechage to the bronze medal match but lost there as well.

In the men's freestyle wrestling, 2018 world champion David Taylor upset the defending Olympic and world champion Hassan Yazdani to win gold. Kyle Dake, after winning the 2018 and 2019 world championships in the 79 kg, was unable to match that success in the Olympic 74 kg, losing in the quarter-final to Mahamedkhabib Kadzimahamedau, and then proceeded to clinch bronze after battling in the repechage. Gable Steveson, meanwhile, scored an incredible upset, defeating the 2017, 2018, and 2019 world champion Geno Petriashvili for the gold medal. Kyle Snyder faced off against Abdulrashid Sadulaev of the ROC in the gold medal game and lost a close contest on points. Snyder was the defending Olympic champion and 2019 world championship bronze medalist.

Key:

- VT (ranking points: 5–0 or 0–5) – Victory by fall.
- VB (ranking points: 5–0 or 0–5) – Victory by injury (VF for forfeit, VA for withdrawal or disqualification)
- PP (ranking points: 3–1 or 1–3) – Decision by points – the loser with technical points.
- PO (ranking points: 3–0 or 0–3) – Decision by points – the loser without technical points.
- ST (ranking points: 4–0 or 0–4) – Great superiority – the loser without technical points and a margin of victory of at least 8 (Greco-Roman) or 10 (freestyle) points.
- SP (ranking points: 4–1 or 1–4) – Technical superiority – the loser with technical points and a margin of victory of at least 8 (Greco-Roman) or 10 (freestyle) points.

Men

Athlete	Event	Round of 16	Quarterfinal	Semifinal	Repechage	Final / BM	
Athlete	Event	Opposition Result	Opposition Result	Opposition Result	Opposition Result	Opposition Result	Rank
Thomas Gilman	Freestyle 57 kg	Uguev (ROC); L 1–3 ^{PP}	Did not advance		Abdullaev (UZB); W 4–1 ^{SP}	Atri (IRI); W 3–1 ^{PP}	3rd place, bronze medalist(s)
Kyle Dake	Freestyle 74 kg	Hosseinkhani (IRI); W 3–0 ^{PO}	Kadimagomedov (BLR); L 0–4 ^{ST}	Did not advance	Garzón (CUB); W 4–0 ^{ST}	Chamizo (ITA); W 3–0 ^{PO}	3rd place, bronze medalist(s)
David Taylor	Freestyle 86 kg	Shabanau (BLR); W 4–0 ^{ST}	Amine (SMR); W 4–1 ^{SP}	Punia (IND); W 4–0 ^{ST}	Bye	Yazdani (IRI); W 3–1 ^{PP}	1st place, gold medalist(s)
Kyle Snyder	Freestyle 97 kg	Steen (CAN); W 4–1 ^{SP}	Conyedo (ITA); W 3–0 ^{PO}	Karadeniz (TUR); W 3–0 ^{PO}	Bye	Sadulaev (ROC); L 1–3 ^{PP}	2nd place, silver medalist(s)
Gable Steveson	Freestyle 125 kg	Lazarev (KGZ); W 4–0 ^{ST}	Akgül (TUR); W 3–0 ^{PO}	Mönkhtör (MGL); W 3–0 ^{PO}	Bye	Petriashvili (GEO); W 3–1 ^{PP}	1st place, gold medalist(s)
Ildar Hafizov	Greco-Roman 60 kg	Orta (CUB); L 0–3 ^{PO}	Did not advance		Emelin (ROC); L 1–3 ^{PP}	Did not advance	12
Alejandro Sancho	Greco-Roman 67 kg	Surkov (ROC); L 1–3 ^{PP}	Did not advance				10
John Stefanowicz	Greco-Roman 87 kg	Huklek (CRO); L 1–3 ^{PP}	Did not advance				12
G'Angelo Hancock	Greco-Roman 97 kg	Kadžaja (SRB); W 3–1^{PP}	Michalik (POL); L 1–3^{PP}	Did not advance			7

Women

Athlete	Event	Round of 16	Quarterfinal	Semifinal	Repechage	Final / BM	
Athlete	Event	Opposition Result	Opposition Result	Opposition Result	Opposition Result	Opposition Result	Rank
Sarah Hildebrandt	50 kg	Demirhan (TUR); W 4–0 ^{ST}	Selishka (BUL); W 4–1 ^{SP}	Sun (CHN); L 1–3 ^{PP}	Bye	Livach (UKR); W 4–1 ^{SP}	3rd place, bronze medalist(s)
Jacarra Winchester	53 kg	Khoroshavtseva (ROC); W 3–1 ^{PP}	Pang (CHN); L 1–3 ^{PP}	Did not advance	Hérin (CUB); W 3–0 ^{PO}	Kaladzinskaya (BLR); L 0–5 ^{VT}	5
Helen Maroulis	57 kg	Rong (CHN); W 3–1 ^{PP}	Kit (UKR); W 3–0 ^{PO}	Kawai (JPN); L 1–3 ^{PP}	Bye	Boldsaikhan (MGL); W 4–0 ^{ST}	3rd place, bronze medalist(s)
Kayla Miracle	62 kg	Long (CHN); L 1–3 ^{PP}	Did not advance				12
Tamyra Mensah-Stock	68 kg	Dosho (JPN); W 4–0 ^{ST}	Zhou (CHN); W 4–0 ^{ST}	Cherkasova (UKR); W 3–1 ^{PP}	Bye	Oborududu (NGR); W 3–1 ^{PP}	1st place, gold medalist(s)
Adeline Gray	76 kg	Sghaier (TUN); W 5–0 ^{VT}	Adar (TUR); W 3–1 ^{PP}	Medet Kyzy (KGZ); W 3–1 ^{PP}	Bye	Rotter-Focken (GER); L 1–3 ^{PP}	2nd place, silver medalist(s)

== See also ==
- United States at the 2019 Pan American Games
- United States at the 2020 Winter Youth Olympics
- United States at the 2020 Summer Paralympics
