= Battle of the Brians =

Figure skating rivalry between Brian Boitano and Brian Orser

The Battle of the Brians was an informal name given by the press to the figure skating rivalry between Canadian Brian Orser and American Brian Boitano at the 1988 Winter Olympics in Calgary. This competition is considered one of the most memorable in men's figure skating history.

== Background ==
The "Battle of the Brians" has been called "one of the great rivalries in modern figure skating" and "one of the greatest head-to-head matchups in the history" of the sport.

Brian Orser won the silver medal at the 1984 Winter Olympics. Brian Boitano placed fifth. Orser placed second at the 1985 World Figure Skating Championships, with Boitano one step below him. Boitano won the next year.

When Orser won the 1987 World Figure Skating Championships, held in Cincinnati, Ohio, U.S., Boitano knew he would have to make a change in his skating if he were to beat Orser at the Calgary Olympics on Orser's home turf of Canada. He turned to choreographer Sandra Bezic, who helped effect a major change in his skating style. At the 1988 Skate Canada, held at the same venue they were to compete four months later at the Olympics, both skaters debuted their Olympic free skating programs. Orser came in first place, narrowly defeating Boitano.

Orser and Boitano were well-matched in many ways. Both were excellent skaters who had a jump as their signature move; Orser was well known for his triple Axel and Boitano had invented the 'Tano triple Lutz, a triple Lutz with one arm raised above the head. Going into the Olympics, both were their country's nationals champions and favorites for the gold. Media hype going into the Olympics was augmented by the fact that Orser was the reigning world champion and that he was competing in his home country. As figure skating historian James R. Hines states, "the pressure to become the first Canadian man to win an Olympic gold medal was daunting".

== Competition ==
There were three phases of competition: the compulsory figures, the short program, and the long program. Boitano came in second place after the compulsory figures, while Orser came in third place. Orser won the short program, while Boitano came in second place. At that time, figures counted for 30% of the score and the short program counted for 20%. The difference between Orser and Boitano was so small that the skater who won the long program would win the title. Adding to the excitement, both Boitano and Orser both had military-themed long programs. They were in a "virtual dead heat" going into the free skate.

Boitano was the first to skate. His program was technically perfect with no mistakes. His program, set to the music of "Napoleon", showed five stages in a soldier's life. Boitano landed eight triple jumps, two of them triple Axels. Another signature move, a prolonged spread eagle, lasted ten seconds. Boitano's scores were:

Boitano	FRG	USA	DEN	URS	SUI	JPN	GDR	CAN	TCH
Technical merit	5.8	5.9	5.9	5.9	5.9	5.8	5.8	5.8	5.9
Artistic impression	5.8	5.9	5.7	5.8	5.8	5.9	5.8	5.8	5.9
Placement	2	1	1	1	1	1	2	2	2

Orser skated after him. His program was to "Dance of the Carter" and "Dance of Kozelkov and His Friends" from the ballet The Bolt by Dmitri Shostakovich. He had originally planned to do two triple Axels but decided at the last minute to do only one of them by doubling his last triple Axel. He also stepped out of a triple flip towards the beginning. He landed seven triple jumps. Orser's scores were:

Orser	FRG	USA	DEN	URS	SUI	JPN	GDR	CAN	TCH
Technical merit	5.8	5.8	5.8	5.8	5.8	5.8	5.8	5.8	5.9
Artistic impression	5.9	5.9	5.8	5.8	5.9	5.8	5.9	5.9	6.0
Placement	1	2	2	2	2	2	1	1	1

In a 5–4 split, the judges awarded Boitano the gold and Orser his second Olympic silver medal. Though Orser won 4 judges' votes outright while Boitano won 3, two remaining judges that placed them with equal total mark gave Boitano higher technical mark, which was the tiebreaker. This was the last Olympics in which the technical mark was used as tiebreaker in the long program; in following years, the artistic mark was given precedence in the event of tie, which would have changed the split to 6–3 in Orser's favour.

== Similar nicknames ==
At the same 1988 Winter Olympics, the "Battle of the Carmens" was used to describe the rivalry in the ladies figure skating competition between East German Katarina Witt and American Debi Thomas.

On February 22, 2010, CTV's lead sportscaster Brian Williams did a skit with the anchor of NBC Nightly News, another Brian Williams, at CTV's Olympic set. Some in the media dubbed this the new "Battle of the Brians", as NBC's Williams compared his own modest set to CTV's expensive Olympic studio.

== See also ==
- 1988 Winter Olympics
- Battle of the Carmens
- Figure skating at the 1988 Winter Olympics
- What Would Brian Boitano Do?
