= South Park: Bigger, Longer & Uncut (soundtrack) =

Soundtrack album by Trey Parker & Marc Shaiman
- Released: June 22, 1999
- Recorded: 1998–1999
- Genre: Soundtrack
- Length: 50:25
- Label: Atlantic
- Producer: Darren Higman

South Park chronology
Chef Aid: The South Park Album (1998)	South Park: Bigger, Longer & Uncut (1999)	Mr. Hankey's Christmas Classics (1999)

Professional ratings
Review scores
Source	Rating
AllMusic	3/5 stars

South Park: Bigger, Longer & Uncut – Music From and Inspired by the Motion Picture is the soundtrack album to the film of the same name. The album was first released by Atlantic Records on June 22, 1999. The album inlay states that only the first 12 tracks on the album appear in the actual film. The remainder, described as being "inspired" by the film, are mostly other acts performing alternative versions of these songs; however, D.V.D.A.'s "What Would Brian Boitano Do? Pt. II" and Michael McDonald's "Eyes of a Child" are heard in the closing credits. The songs were all written by Trey Parker and Marc Shaiman.

== Singles ==
"Good Love"

- CD1
1. "Good Love" – performed by Chef
2. "Eyes of a Child" – performed by Michael McDonald
3. "Mountain Town" – performed by the cast of South Park
- CD2
1. "Good Love" – performed by Chef
2. "Kyle's Mom's a Big Fat Bitch" (Radio Edit) – performed by Eric Cartman and Joe C.
3. "What Would Brian Boitano Do?" (Cast Version) – performed by Kyle, Cartman & Stan

"Blame Canada" – promotional single only

1. "Blame Canada" (main version)
2. "Blame Canada (O Canada)" (main version)

"What Would Brian Boitano Do? Pt. II" – promotional single only

1. "What Would Brian Boitano Do?" (Pt. II)
2. "What Would Brian Boitano Do?" (Cast Version)

"Shut Yo Face (Uncle F**ka)"/"Riches to Rags (MMMKay)" [12" split]

- Side A: Trick Daddy featuring Trina & Tre+6 – "Shut Yo Face (Uncle F**ka)"
1. Album version – performed by Trick Daddy, Trina, & Tre+6
2. Instrumental
3. Acapella
- Side B: Nappy Roots – "Riches to Rags (MMMKay)"
1. Radio edit – performed by Nappy Roots
2. Album version
3. Instrumental

== Track listing ==
(*): The recording not contained in the actual film.

Track listing for South Park: Bigger, Longer & Uncut
#	Song	Running Time (minutes)	Characters	Performers
1	"Mountain Town"	4:27	Stan Marsh; Kenny McCormick; Kyle Broflovski; Eric Cartman; Sharon Marsh; Sheila Broflovski	Trey Parker; Matt Stone; Mary Kay Bergman
2	"Uncle Fucka"	1:06	Terrance and Phillip	Trey Parker; Matt Stone
3	"It's Easy, M'Kay"	1:54	Mr. Mackey; Stan Marsh; Eric Cartman; Kyle Broflovski; Gregory; Wendy Testaburger	Trey Parker; Matt Stone; Mary Kay Bergman
4	"Blame Canada"	1:35	Sheila Broflovski; Sharon Marsh; Liane Cartman; Carol McCormick	Mary Kay Bergman
5	"Kyle's Mom's a Bitch"	1:15	Eric Cartman	Trey Parker; Marc Shaiman
6	"What Would Brian Boitano Do?"	1:34	Stan Marsh; Kyle Broflovski; Eric Cartman	Trey Parker; Matt Stone
7	"Up There"	2:23	Satan the Dark Prince	Trey Parker
8	"La Resistance (Medley)"; Begins as a new song, "La Resistance," then becomes a medley of that song and most of the songs featured earlier in the movie ("Blame Canada," "Up There," "Uncle Fucker," "Mountain Town")	1:52	Gregory; The people of South Park	Howard McGillin; Mary Kay Bergman; Matt Stone; Trey Parker the cast from the movie
9	"Eyes of a Child"	3:39	Michael McDonald	
10	"I Can Change"	2:05	Saddam Hussein; Satan	Matt Stone; Trey Parker
11	"I'm Super"	1:26	Big Gay Al	Trey Parker
12	"Mountain Town (Reprise)"	1:02	The people of South Park	Isaac Hayes; Trey Parker; Matt Stone; Mary Kay Bergman
13	"Good Love"*	3:31	Chef	Isaac Hayes
14	"Shut Yo Face (Uncle Fucka)"*	3:59	Trick Daddy; Trina; Tre +6	
15	"Riches to Rags (Mmmkay)"*	4:31	Nappy Roots	
16	"Kyle's Mom's a Big Fat Bitch"*	3:54	Joe C. Kid Rock	
17	"What Would Brian Boitano Do? Pt. II"	2:14	D.V.D.A	
18	"I Swear It (I Can Change)"*	2:44	Violent Femmes	
19	"Super"*	4:03	RuPaul	
20	"O Canada"*	1:10	Geddy Lee; Alex Lifeson; Terrance and Phillip	Geddy Lee; Alex Lifeson; Matt Stone; Trey Parker

== Charts ==
Chart performance for South Park: Bigger, Longer & Uncut
Chart (1999–2000)	Peak position
Australian Albums (ARIA)	6
Canadian Albums (Nielsen SoundScan)	20
Finnish Albums (Suomen virallinen lista)	6
New Zealand Albums (RMNZ)	28
Norwegian Albums (VG-lista)	15
US Billboard 200	28
US Top Internet Albums (Billboard)	4

== Certifications ==
Certifications for South Park: Bigger, Longer & Uncut
Region	Certification	Certified units/sales
Australia (ARIA)	Gold	35,000^{^}
United Kingdom (BPI)	Silver	60,000^{^}
United States (RIAA)	Gold	500,000^{^}
^{^} Shipments figures based on certification alone.

== In popular culture ==
"Kyle's Mom's a Bitch" (one of the songs from the soundtrack album for South Park: Bigger, Longer & Uncut) was featured in the 2016 spy action comedy film Grimsby, starring Sacha Baron Cohen.
