= What Would Brian Boitano Do? =

Song by Trey Parker and Marc Shaiman

from the album South Park: Bigger, Longer & Uncut - Music from and Inspired by the Motion Picture
- Language: English
- Released: 1999
- Genre: Absurdist, comedy
- Length: 1:34
- Label: Atlantic
- Composer: Marc Shaiman
- Lyricist: Trey Parker
- Producer: Darren Higman

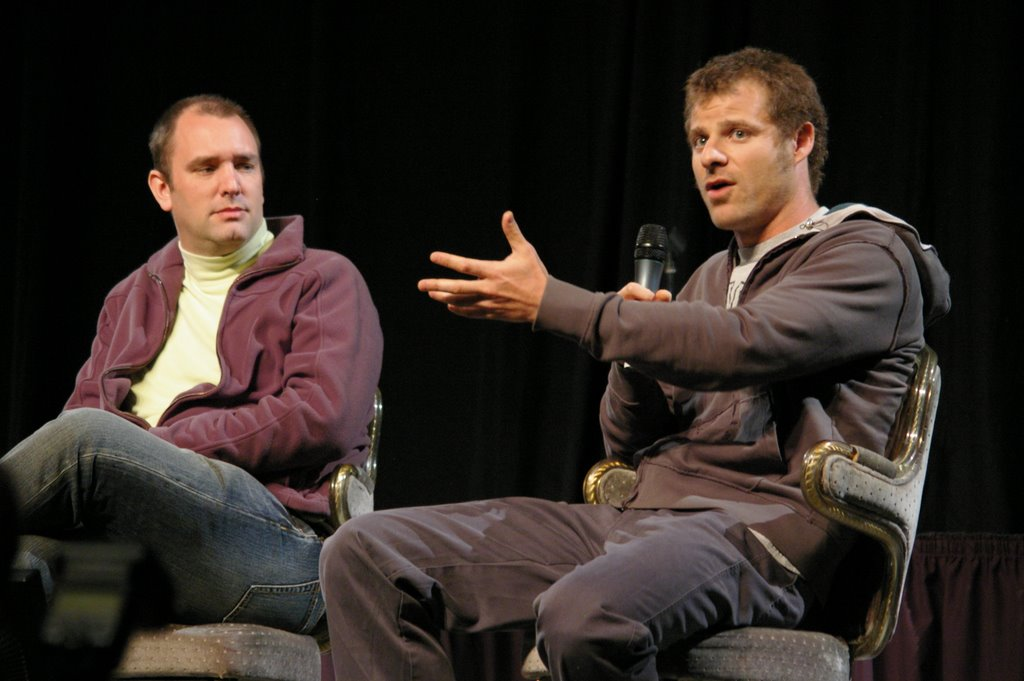
South Park creators Trey Parker and Matt Stone at a 2007 appearance.

"What Would Brian Boitano Do?" is a song from the 1999 film South Park: Bigger, Longer & Uncut written by South Park co-creator Trey Parker and composer Marc Shaiman. In the song, Olympic and professional figure skater Brian Boitano is treated lyrically as a superhero in a series of increasingly ludicrous situations. The title of the absurdist song is a parody of the evangelical Christian motto "What Would Jesus Do?"

== Background ==
Olympic and professional figure skater Brian Boitano is a recurring figure in the animated television series South Park, which debuted in 1997. In actuality the use of a fictionalized Boitano's character predates the show, with an angel-like Boitano materializing to lend advice in the second "The Spirit of Christmas" short (Jesus vs. Santa) animated film, made by South Park creators Trey Parker and Matt Stone in 1995 while still students at the University of Colorado.

In the short, Stan Marsh asks Eric Cartman, "What would Brian Boitano do?" as Jesus battles Santa Claus.

Boitano's character also appears in the fourth episode of the first season of the South Park television series in the episode "Big Gay Al's Big Gay Boat Ride". In this September 1997 episode of the show the Boitano character appears ice dancing during the gay liberation-themed song "We're All Gay and It's OK!" The very private Boitano came out publicly as gay only on December 19, 2013, days after being named by President Barack Obama to the American delegation to the 2014 Winter Olympics in Sochi, Russia.

== Song ==
The Boitano character was revisited in the 1999 South Park musical film, Bigger, Longer, and Uncut, with the song "What Would Brian Boitano Do?" by Trey Parker and composer Marc Shaiman.

In the absurdist song, Boitano is cast as an action hero, with his 1988 Olympic Winter Games victory escalated into a series of increasingly ludicrous purported achievements to include fighting grizzly bears in the Alps with his "magical fire breath", time travel to the year 3010 to do battle with an evil robot king to save the human race again, and construction of the Great Pyramids of Egypt while at the same time beating up 13th-century Mongol emperor Kublai Khan, because he "doesn't take shit from anybody", and Brian Dennehy confuses the boys saying "Brian Boitano" with his name.

"What Would Brian Boitano Do?" is reprised with an aggressive folk punk version featured prominently in the movie's closing credits. Recorded by Stone and Parker's band DVDA, the up-tempo and energetic alternate version further reveals that Boitano also has an apparently limitless appetite for chicken wings in a brief heavy metal bridge section.

== Boitano's response ==
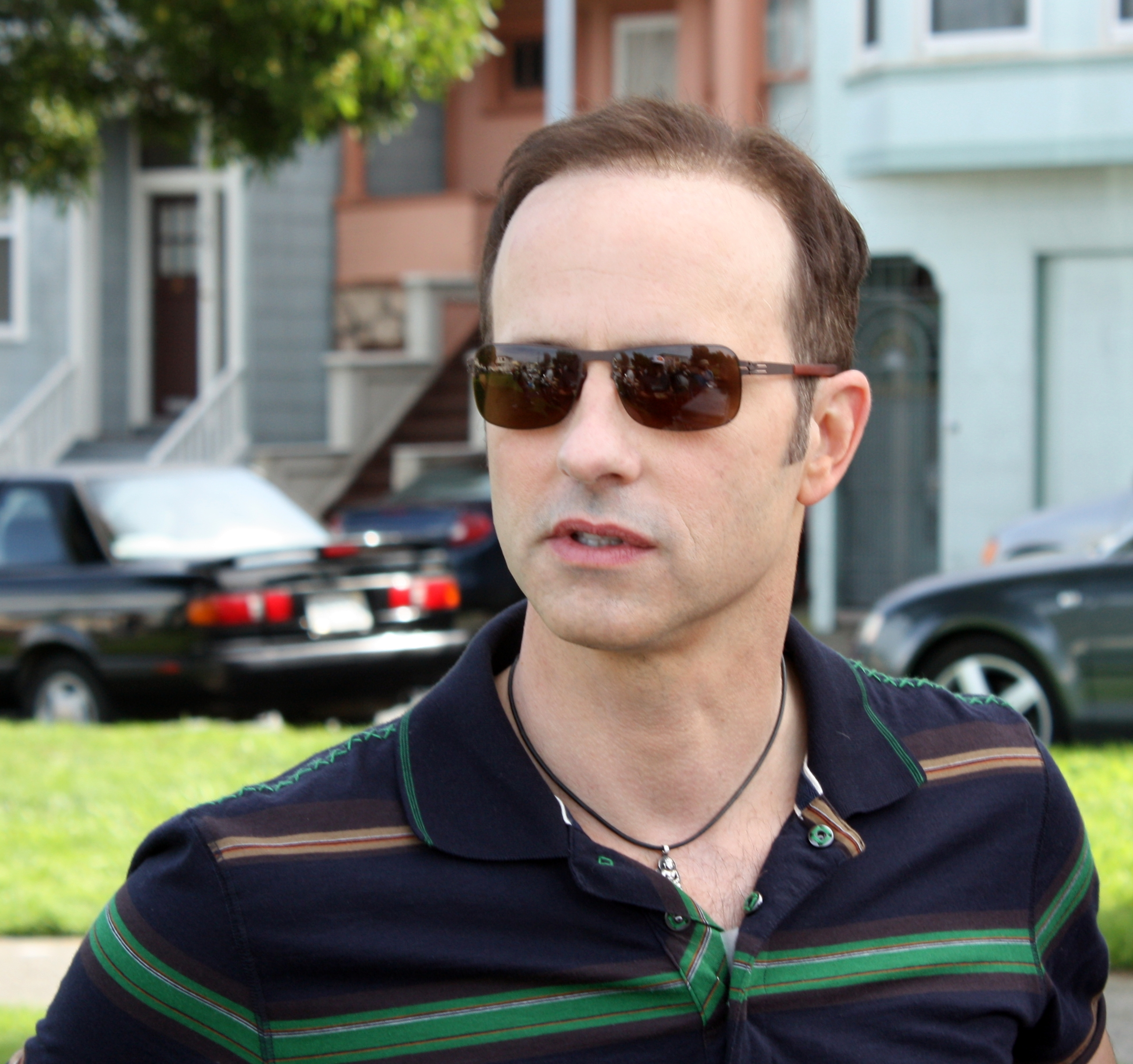
Brian Boitano in 2010.

In a series of interviews, Boitano has reacted light-heartedly to the use of his name in the song. Having no prior acquaintance with Parker or Stone, he went to see Bigger, Longer, and Uncut alone, with misgivings about possibly being treated harshly in the film. Instead, he experienced hearing the line "What Would Brian Boitano Do?" in the film being received with appreciative laughter, which he found to be "surreal."

Boitano's agent subsequently received permission to make T-shirts featuring the South Park Boitano character with the proceeds donated to charity. In addition to providing original art for the project, Stone and Parker included affectionate notes emphasizing their personal respect for Boitano. Boitano in turn appeared on an episode of a VH1 television documentary, VH1 Goes Inside: South Park to speak about his perspective on the show. "If they'd ragged on me, I wouldn't have [done the VH1 show]", Boitano noted in a 2007 Entertainment Weekly interview.

"It's become such a part of my life," Boitano remarked in a 2006 interview with the San Francisco Chronicle. "Kids who don't know who I am, or what I did at the Olympics, meet me and think I'm cool because I'm in South Park."

Boitano also starred in a TV show on the Food Network premiering on August 23, 2009, the title of which, What Would Brian Boitano Make?, mirrors the song's title. This tangent led to Boitano's authorship of a cookbook by the same title, published in 2013.

== See also ==
- Battle of the Brians
- Figure skating at the 1988 Winter Olympics
