= Gillian Wachsman =

American former pair skater (born 1966)

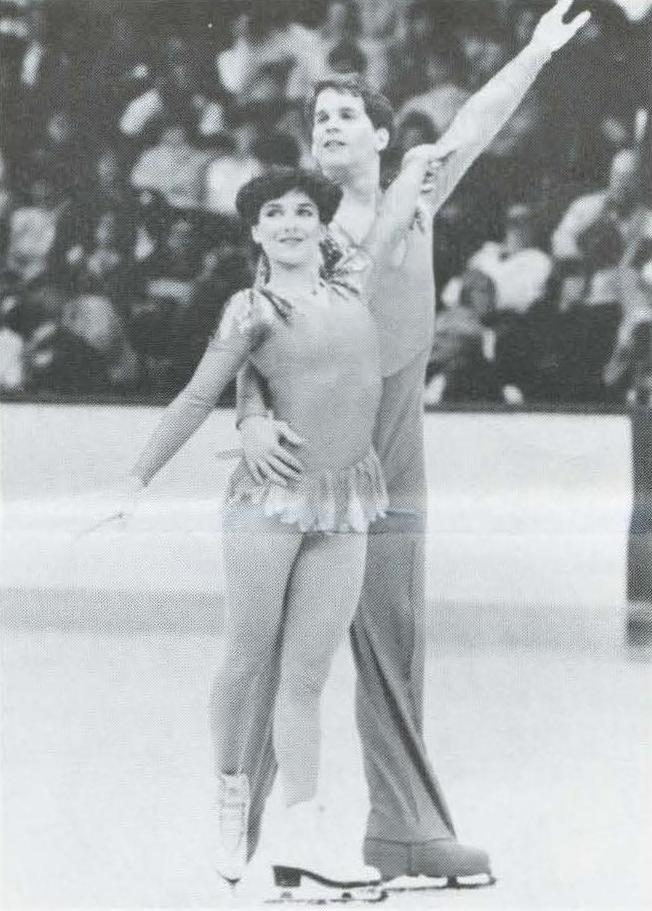
- Wachsman with Todd Waggoner circa 1986

Personal information
- Full name: Gillian Margaret Wachsman
- Born: September 19, 1966 (age 59) Riverside, Connecticut, U.S.
- Height: 5 ft 1 in (1.55 m)

Figure skating career
- Country: United States
- Retired: 1988

Gillian Margaret Wachsman (born September 19, 1966) is an American former pair skater. With Todd Waggoner, she is the 1985 NHK Trophy champion, 1985 Skate America bronze medalist, and 1986 U.S. national champion. The pair competed at the 1988 Winter Olympics, placing fifth, and at three World Championships, placing as high as fourth.

== Career ==
Early in her career, Gillian Wachsman competed with Robert Daw. They placed fourth at the 1984 Skate America and won the pewter medal twice at the U.S. Championships.

Wachsman teamed up with Todd Waggoner in the autumn of 1984. In their first season together, they took the bronze medal at the U.S. Championships. The following season, the pair won bronze at the 1985 Skate America, gold at the 1985 NHK Trophy, and then gold at the 1986 U.S. Championships ahead of Jill Watson / Peter Oppegard. They were assigned to their first World Championships and finished seventh. The pair was coached by Pauline Williams.

After winning silver at the 1988 U.S. Championships, Wachsman/Waggoner were selected to represent the United States at the 1988 Winter Olympics. The pair placed fifth in Calgary. Their final amateur competition was the 1988 World Championships where they placed fourth. They retired in order to focus on their educations.

== Results ==
=== With Todd Waggoner ===
International
Event	1984–85	1985–86	1986–87	1987–88
Winter Olympics				5th
World Championships		7th	7th	4th
Skate America		3rd		
NHK Trophy		1st		2nd
National
U.S. Championships	3rd	1st	2nd	2nd

=== With Robert Daw ===
International
Event	1982–83	1983–84
Skate America		4th
National
U.S. Championships	4th	4th
