= What Would Brian Boitano Make? =

- Starring: Brian Boitano
- Theme music composer: Marc Shaiman
- Opening theme: "What Would Brian Boitano Do?"
- Country of origin: United States
- No. of episodes: 14

Production
- Producer: Concentric Entertainment
- Running time: 30 minutes

Original release
- Network: Food Network
- Release: August 23, 2009 – 2010

What Would Brian Boitano Make? is a cooking show on Food Network hosted by Brian Boitano. It first aired on August 23, 2009. The show features Boitano cooking several dishes and then entertaining his friends. Boitano is a self-taught cook, who started cooking in earnest at age 25.

The show's name is based on "What Would Brian Boitano Do?", a song from the film South Park: Bigger, Longer and Uncut, and uses a shortened version of the song as its theme music.

== Production ==
All episodes are shot in Boitano's home in San Francisco. Boitano comes up with the recipes himself.

A second season consisting of ten episodes began airing on March 7, 2010.
