= Brian Orser =

Canadian figure skater

Brian Orser OC
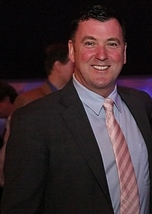
- Brian Orser in 2014
- Born: Brian Ernest Orser; 18 December 1961 (age 64); Belleville, Ontario, Canada
- Occupations: Figure skater; Coach
- Years active: 1977-present
- Height: 5 ft 6.5 in (169 cm)
- Spouse: Rajesh Tiwari
- Awards: Order of Canada (1985)
- Figure skating career
- Retired: 1988
Medal record
Representing Canada
Men's figure skating
Olympic Games
Silver medal – second place	1984 Sarajevo	Men's singles
Silver medal – second place	1988 Calgary	Men's singles
World Championships
Gold medal – first place	1987 Cincinnati	Men's singles
Silver medal – second place	1984 Ottawa	Men's singles
Silver medal – second place	1985 Tokyo	Men's singles
Silver medal – second place	1986 Geneva	Men's singles
Silver medal – second place	1988 Budapest	Men's singles
Bronze medal – third place	1983 Helsinki	Men's singles

Brian Ernest Orser OC OLY (born 18 December 1961) is a Canadian former competitive and professional figure skater and coach to Olympic champions. He is the 1984 and 1988 Olympic silver medallist, 1987 World champion and eight-time (1981–88) Canadian national champion. At the 1988 Winter Olympics, the rivalry between Orser and American figure skater Brian Boitano, who were the two favorites to win the gold medal, captured media attention and was described as the "Battle of the Brians".

Orser turned professional in 1988 and skated with Stars on Ice for almost 20 years. As a coach, he has led both Yuna Kim (2010) and Yuzuru Hanyu (2014, 2018) to Olympic titles. He also coached Javier Fernández to Olympic bronze (2018) and the 2015 and 2016 World titles. He is a Skating Consultant at the Toronto Cricket Skating and Curling Club.

== Early life ==
Brian Orser was born in Belleville, Ontario. He grew up in Penetanguishene. He is the youngest of five children.

== Skating career ==
Orser won his first national title on the novice level in 1977. The following season, he went to Junior Worlds and placed 4th, behind eventual rival Brian Boitano. He added a second national title, this time at the junior level, to his resume in 1979.

In 1980, he moved up to the senior level. He won the bronze medal at his first senior international, the Vienna Cup, and then placed 4th at the Canadian Figure Skating Championships. That was the last time he would place off the podium at the national level.

In the 1980–1981 post-Olympic season, Orser began making his mark on the skating world. He won the silver at the Nebelhorn Trophy, placed 6th at Skate Canada, and then won his first of eight National titles. In his debut at Worlds, he placed 6th. The next season, he won his first medal at Skate Canada and moved up to 4th at Worlds. He won his first World medal in 1983, a bronze, positioning him well for the 1983–1984 Olympic season.

Orser became the second man to land the triple Axel when he performed it in winning his Canadian junior title in 1979, at a time when few senior skaters were even attempting it. Over the next few years, Orser performed the jump more frequently and more consistently than any other skater of the time. Orser became the first man to land the triple Axel at the Olympics when he landed it in his free skate at the 1984 Winter Olympics. He won the silver medal behind Scott Hamilton, and then won the silver at 1984 Worlds, again behind Hamilton. Only Orser's low placements in the compulsory figures prevented him from winning both titles.

In the 1984–1985 season, after Hamilton's retirement, Orser was seemingly poised to become the dominant champion. He had an imperfect Worlds, and placed second to Alexander Fadeev, who also had the triple Axel in his repertoire. Orser resolved to begin including two Axels, not just one, in his free skate, in order to give himself an advantage over Fadeev. He finally won Worlds in 1987. At that competition he became the first skater at the World Championships to land two triple Axels in the free skate and three in the same competition.

Going into the 1988 Olympics, Orser worked with a sports psychologist on visual imagery. He and Brian Boitano were thrust into the Battle of the Brians, each being the other's main rival. Orser was undefeated in the 1986–1987 season and had not lost a competition since losing to Boitano at the 1986 Worlds. At the Olympics, Orser served as the flag-bearer for Canada during the opening ceremonies. He placed 3rd in compulsory figures segment of the competition, 1st in the short program, and second in the free skating, winning the silver medal overall. Brian Boitano won the gold medal, defeating Orser by 0.10 points.

He won the silver again at Worlds in 1988, after winning the free skate. Orser turned professional following that season. He had not placed off a podium at any competition since 1982. During his competitive career, he trained at the Mariposa School of Skating, originally located in Orillia, Ontario and was moved to Barrie, Ontario in 1988. An arena in Orillia was renamed for Orser in 1984.

== Professional skating career ==
Orser began touring with Stars on Ice in 1988, soon after ending his competitive career. He would go on to appear with them on and off for nearly 20 years, skating his last with the show in 2007.

Orser starred in the 1990 German skating dance film Carmen on Ice, alongside his archrival Brian Boitano and Katarina Witt. The film told the story of Carmen wordlessly through ice skating; Orser played the part of Escamillo.

Orser performed in many ice shows and was known in the show business as one of the few people who could perform a backflip. Unfortunately, in 2007, he suffered from a broken wrist which occurred while stepping backward off the ice. Since then he has decided not to continue doing backflips and has greatly decreased his participation in ice shows.

== Coaching career ==
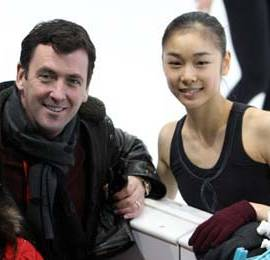
Orser with Yuna Kim in 2007.

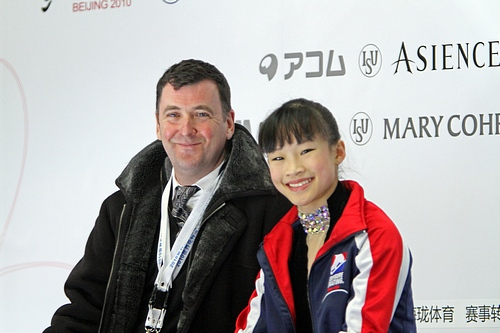
Orser with Christina Gao in 2010.

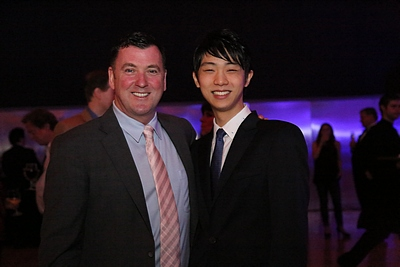
Orser with Yuzuru Hanyu in 2014.

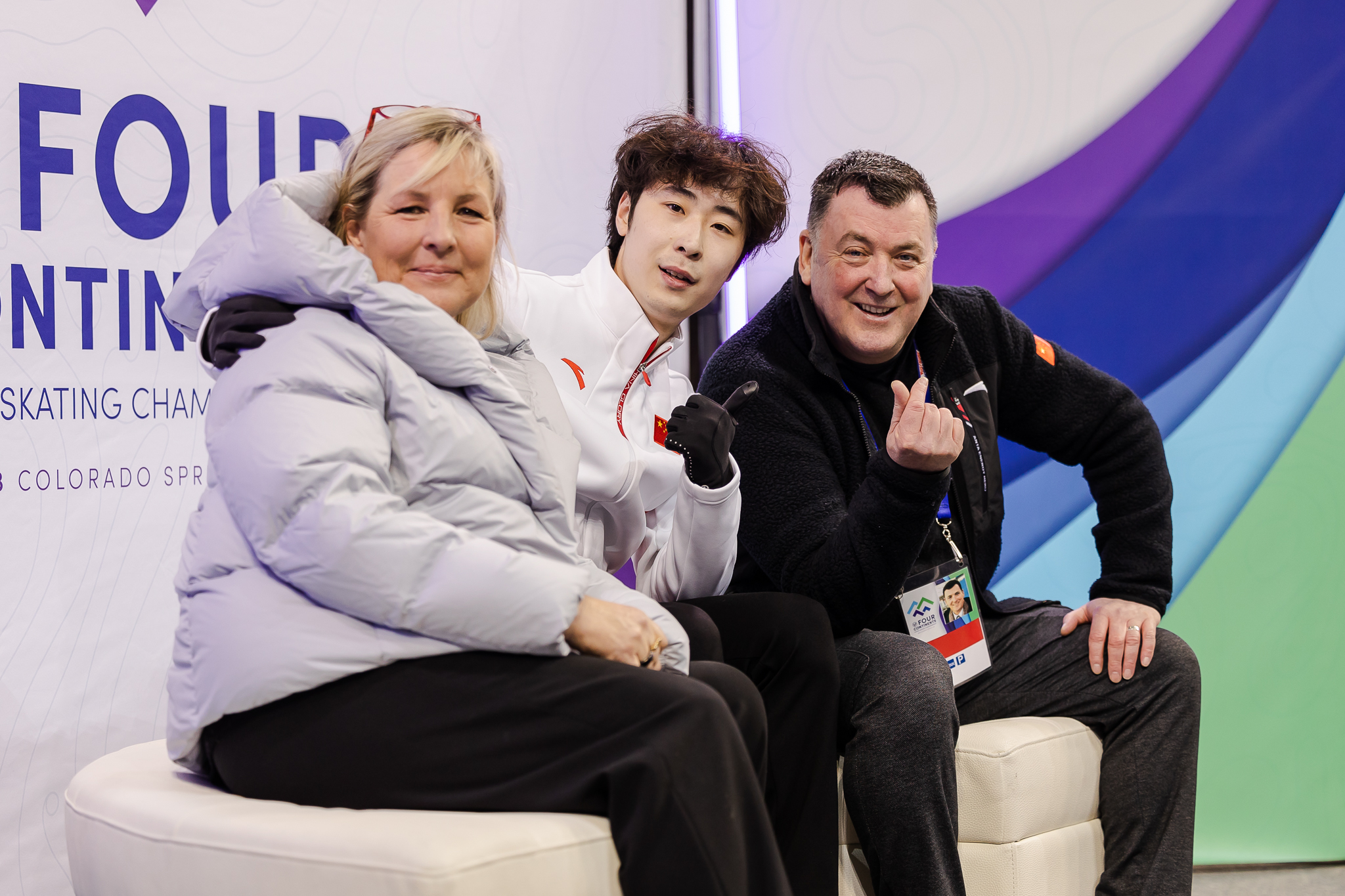
Orser with Jin Boyang and Tracy Wilson at the 2023 Four Continents Championships.

He is the head instructor at the Toronto Cricket Skating and Curling Club along with Tracy Wilson.

His current students include:

- (Canada) Victoria Barakhtina – began coaching in August 2024.
- (United States) Lucas Broussard – began coaching in May 2025.
- (United States) Logan Higase-Chen – began coaching in 2025.
- (Thailand) Pimmpida Lerdpraiwan – began coaching in 2024.
- (United States) Daniel Martynov – began coaching in fall 2025.
- (Canada) Kaiya Ruiter – began coaching in September 2024.
- (Canada) Hetty Shi – began coaching in 2024.
- (Japan) Seigo Tauchi – began coaching in summer 2025.

His former students include:

- (Canada) Grayson Long – began coaching in 2019.
- (Canada) Fedor Andreev – began coaching him in the fall of 2007.
- (United States) Jason Brown – began coaching in summer of 2018 to 2025; coached him to win silver at the 2020 Four Continents Championships.
- (Australia) Sean Carlow – in 2007 and 2008.
- (Canada) Alaine Chartrand – part-time, began coaching her in August 2014 until her retirement.
- (South Korea) Cha Jun-hwan – coached from March 2015 to June 2023, coached him to win the 2022 Four Continents title, silver at the 2023 World Championships, and bronze at the 2018–19 Grand Prix of Figure Skating Final.
- (Italy) (Canada) Corey Circelli – coached from 2013 to 2025.
- (Canada) Gabrielle Daleman – coached her from spring 2015 to 2019, coached her to win bronze at the 2017 World Championships.
- (Australia) Phoebe Di Tommaso in 2007 and 2008.
- (South Africa) Michaela Du Toit – began coaching her in 2012 until her retirement
- (Spain) Javier Fernández – began coaching in mid-2011, coached him to win the bronze medal at the 2018 Winter Olympics, the 2015 and 2016 World Championships titles and to become the 7-time European Champion (2013–2019).
- (United States) Christina Gao – from 2009 to 2012, coached her to win bronze at the 2009 Junior Grand Prix Final.
- (Georgia (country)) Elene Gedevanishvili – began in mid-2011 to summer of 2013, coached her to win the 2012 European bronze medal.
- (Canada) Stephen Gogolev – coached him to win the JGP Final at just 13 years old
- (Japan) Yuzuru Hanyu – April 2012 to 2022 when Hanyu retired, coached him to win the 2014 and 2018 Olympic titles, the 2014 and 2017 World Championships titles, the 2020 Four Continents Championships title and 4 golds at Grand Prix of Figure Skating Final from 2013 to 2016.
- (Sweden) Joshi Helgesson – coached her from 2016 to 2018.
- (China) Jin Boyang – coached from 2022 to 2025.
- (Japan) Rika Kihira – initially intended to begin training in July 2020, but due to the COVID-19 pandemic, they could not coach in-person until September 2021.
- (South Korea) Yuna Kim – March 2007 to August 2010, coached her to win the 2009 World Championships and 2010 Olympic gold.
- (Canada) Rachel Kirkland / Eric Radford – 2005 to 2009.
- (Poland) Ekaterina Kurakova – coached from December 2018 to September 2021. He began working with her again in July 2023 to May 2024.
- (South Korea) Kwak Min-jeong – February to August 2010.
- (Spain) Sonia Lafuente – began in October 2013 to 2014.
- (Russia) Evgenia Medvedeva – began coaching in June 2018, coached her to win bronze at the 2019 World Championships. Coached her until September 2020.
- (United States) Emilia Murdock – coached from 2020 to 2022.
- (Canada) Nam Nguyen – began coaching him in the summer of 2012 to the spring of 2016, coached him to win the 2014 World Junior Championships.
- (Japan) Shingo Nishiyama – coached from 2016 to 2018
- (Canada) Conrad Orzel – coached from the summer of 2019 to August 2022.
- (United States) Adam Rippon – December 2008 to March 2010.
- (Canada) Roman Sadovsky – coached during the 2016–17 season.
- (South Korea) Shin Ji-a – coached from August 2024 to summer 2025.
- (Kazakhstan) Elizabet Tursynbayeva – began in 2013 to June 2018.
- (China) Zhu Yi – coached from early 2020 to late 2021.

== Awards and honours ==
Orser was appointed a Member of the Order of Canada (CM) in 1985 and promoted to Officer of the same order in 1988.

Orser, along with his two co-stars, won an Emmy Award for his performance in Carmen on Ice after it appeared on HBO.

Orser has been elected to the following halls of fame:

- Canada's Sports Hall of Fame, 1989
- Canadian Olympic Hall of Fame, 1995
- Midland (Ontario) Sports Hall of Fame, 1998
- Penetanguishene Sports Hall of Fame, 2003
- World Figure Skating Hall of Fame, 2009
- Ontario Sports Hall of Fame, 2012

== Personal life ==
Orser is openly gay. He was forced to reveal his sexuality in November 1998, when he lost a legal battle to prevent public disclosure when his former partner sued him for palimony. Orser initially feared the revelation of being gay would ruin his career, but he has since embraced support from other skaters and the public. Since 2008, he has been in a relationship with Rajesh Tiwari, a director of The Brian Orser Foundation. Harvey Brownstone, Canada's first openly gay judge, officiated at their wedding ceremony.

== Programs ==
Season	Short program	Free skating	Exhibition
1987–1988	Sing Sing Sing by Benny Goodman	Ballet Suite No.5 from The Bolt by Dmitri Shostakovich	Story of my Life; Hungarian Rhapsody No. 2 Franz Liszt

== Competitive highlights ==
International
Event	76–77	77–78	78–79	79–80	80–81	81–82	82–83	83–84	84–85	85–86	86–87	87–88
Olympics								2nd				2nd
Worlds					6th	4th	3rd	2nd	2nd	2nd	1st	2nd
Skate Canada					6th	2nd	2nd	1st	1st			1st
NHK Trophy									2nd	2nd		
St. Ivel						1st	1st			1st		
Nebelhorn					2nd							
Vienna Cup				3rd								
St. Gervais					1st							
Novarat											1st	
International: Junior
Junior Worlds		4th										
National
Canada	1st N	3rd J	1st J	4th	1st	1st	1st	1st	1st	1st	1st	1st
Levels: N = Novice; J = Junior

== Bibliography ==
- Beisteiner, Johanna, Art music in figure skating, synchronized swimming and rhythmic gymnastics / Kunstmusik in Eiskunstlauf, Synchronschwimmen und rhythmischer Gymnastik. PhD dissertation, Vienna 2005 (German), Austrian Library Network Catalogue. The dissertation contains an extensive description and analysis of Carmen on Ice (Chapter II/2, pages 105–162).
