= Dvda =

American comedy rock band

DVDA
- Also known as: D.V.D.A.
- Origin: United States
- Genre: Comedy rock: Punk rock
- Years active: 1998–present
- Members: Trey Parker; Matt Stone; Bruce Howell; D. A. Young

Dvda, stylized in all caps as DVDA, and often stylised D.V.D.A., is an American comedy rock band founded in 1998 by Trey Parker and Matt Stone, the creators of the animated series South Park. The group's name is an acronym for the pornographic term "double vaginal, double anal", which Parker first encountered while researching his film Orgazmo (1997).

== History ==
Dvda made its debut at the Lapdance festival in Park City, Utah, during the 2000 Sundance season, where Parker and Stone performed satirical originals such as "David Kelley, TV Warrior" and "Robert Redford F***s Babies."

== Musical style ==
Critics characterise Dvda's music as a blend of hard-rock power chords and Broadway-style key changes, delivered with deliberately outrageous, scatological lyrics. AllMusic lists the band under comedy rock, film music and television music, identifying Parker (lead vocals, keyboards) and Stone (drums, bass, backing vocals) as its principal members. The arena-rock pastiche “Now You’re a Man” has been compared to the triumphant montage anthems of 1980s action cinema.

== Film and television work ==
Dvda supplied Now You’re a Man for the opening and closing credits of Orgazmo (1997). The band later contributed self-referential ballads—including the mock-patriotic theme “America, Fuck Yeah!”—to Parker and Stone's marionette satire Team America: World Police (2004); Slant Magazine highlighted the songs as central to the film's over-the-top political humour. Dvda tracks also appear in South Park: Bigger, Longer & Uncut (1999), for instance “What Would Brian Boitano Do?” “Hell Isn’t Good,” (collaboration with James Hetfield of Metallica) and "Hot Lava."

== Live performances ==
Though primarily a studio project, Dvda performs live on special occasions. At the South Park 25th-anniversary concert at Red Rocks Amphitheatre in 2022, Parker and Stone closed the show with an all-star rendition of “America, Fuck Yeah!” featuring members of Rush, Ween and Primus.
