= Carmen on Ice =

1990 dance film

- Directed by: Horant H. Hohlfeld
- Written by: Horant H. Hohlfeld
- Produced by: Thomas Bürger
- Starring: Katarina Witt; Brian Boitano; Brian Orser
- Cinematography: Klaus König
- Music by: Georges Bizet, orchestral arrangement of the opera Carmen by Bert Grund
- Distributed by: Vegas Film
- Release date: 1990
- Running time: 86 minutes
- Country: Germany
- Language: none

Carmen on Ice is a 1990 dance film with a choreography for figure skaters made in Germany. The music is based on the opera Carmen by Georges Bizet in an orchestral version arranged especially for this film. In contrast to figure skating movies of former times, Carmen on Ice is a film without spoken dialogue, which is an innovation in the history of figure skating.

== Plot ==
The story of Carmen on Ice is very similar to the opera Carmen. Analogous to the four-act opera libretto the screenplay has four parts:

- A Square in Sevilla in front of a cigarette factory: Micaela, a village maiden, brings a letter to the Corporal of Dragoons Don José, which was written by his mother. The cigarette girls emerge from the factory, among them the attractive Carmen, who starts to flirt with the men standing on the square. The only man who does not show interest in Carmen is Don José, who is reading his mother's letter. Finally, however, Carmen manages to attract also his attention by dancing for him and giving him a rose. The other young women are jealous, and one of them attacks Carmen. Carmen slashes her face with a knife. Others involve and start a street fighting, which is stopped by Zuniga, the Lieutenant of Dragoons. Everybody accuses Carmen of having started the fight. Zuniga asks Carmen if she has anything to say and also starts to flirt with her. Carmen, however, is not interested in him. Zuniga instructs José to guard Carmen. José ties up her hands with a rope. To escape, Carmen seduces José in a dance with this rope. The corporal unties her hands, and Carmen can run away. The angry Zuniga instructs his dragoons to guard José.
- Evening at Lillas Pastia's inn: Carmen is waiting impatiently for Don José, who has been released from prison. To drive away her boredom, she starts to dance. The toreador Escamillo enters the inn and is welcomed by the other guests. He shows a virtuoso solo dance and attracts Carmen's attention. While Escamillo leaves the inn with his friends, Don José comes in and is welcomed by Carmen, who shows a solo, which leads in a pair dance with her new lover. Suddenly the sound of bugles is heard calling the soldiers back to barracks. When José wants to leave, Carmen gets angry. José affirms his love to her in a solo with the rose she has given to him at their first meeting. Zuniga suddenly interrupts the two lovers and flirts with Carmen, which makes José so jealous, that he attacks the lieutenant, and leaves the service and joins Carmen and her friends.
- A wild and deserted rocky place at night: Carmen has grown tired of José, her new favorite is the toreador Escamillo. She sits at a campfire and tries to tell fortunes by the shapes made by molten lead dropped into cold water. The shape which she holds in her hand is a skull. Carmen is scared and dances nervously around the campfire. Escamillo comes to the place and makes José jealous by showing him Carmen's fan. The two rivals start fighting. Escamillo emerges victorious and retires with Carmen.
- A square in front of the arena in Seville: The square is full of people who cheer to procession as the bullfighting team with Escamillo arrives. Carmen welcomes the toreador and dreams of a wedding dance with him. After the bullfighting team has entered the arena, Carmen is grabbed by Don José and pulled into an outbuilding. José begs her to return his love, but is rejected by Carmen. Don José loses control of himself and stabs Carmen to death.

== Background ==
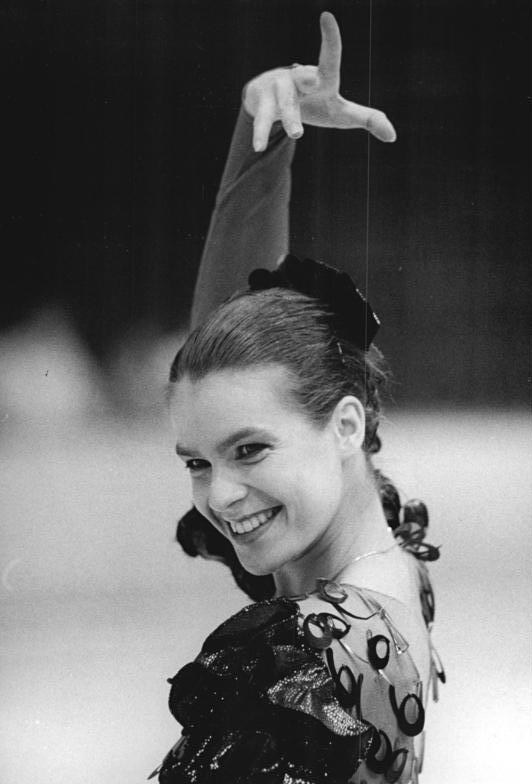
Katarina Witt as Carmen during her free skating in 1988

Carmen on Ice was filmed in Spain and Germany, citizens of Sevilla and Berlin played bit parts. In 1988 Katarina Witt, who played the title role, had won her second olympic gold medal at the winter games in Calgary with a free skating to Carmen. Brian Boitano, who played the part of Don José, became Olympic champion in the same year followed by Brian Orser, the Olympic silver medallist of 1988 and actor playing Escamillo. So, it was obvious to cast the film with these stars. Carmen on Ice was first presented in public on February 8, 1990. and won the Emmy-Award for Outstanding Performance in a Classical Music or Dance Program in 1990. The award was shared by the film's three stars, Boitano, Orser and Witt. The choreography by Sandra Bezic and Michael Seibert (figure skater) was influenced by elements of classical ballet and flamenco as well. During the rehearsals the skaters were also coached by flamenco dancer Cristina Hoyos.

== Bibliography ==
- Art music in figure skating, synchronized swimming and rhythmic gymnastics/Kunstmusik in Eiskunstlauf, Synchronschwimmen und rhythmischer Gymnastik. PhD thesis by Johanna Beisteiner, Vienna 2005, (German). The PhD thesis contains an extensive description and analysis of Carmen on Ice (Chapter II/2, pages 105-162). Article about the PhD thesis of Johanna Beisteiner in the catalogue of the Austrian Library Network. 2005. (German and English)
