= Todd Waggoner =

American former pair skater (born 1965)

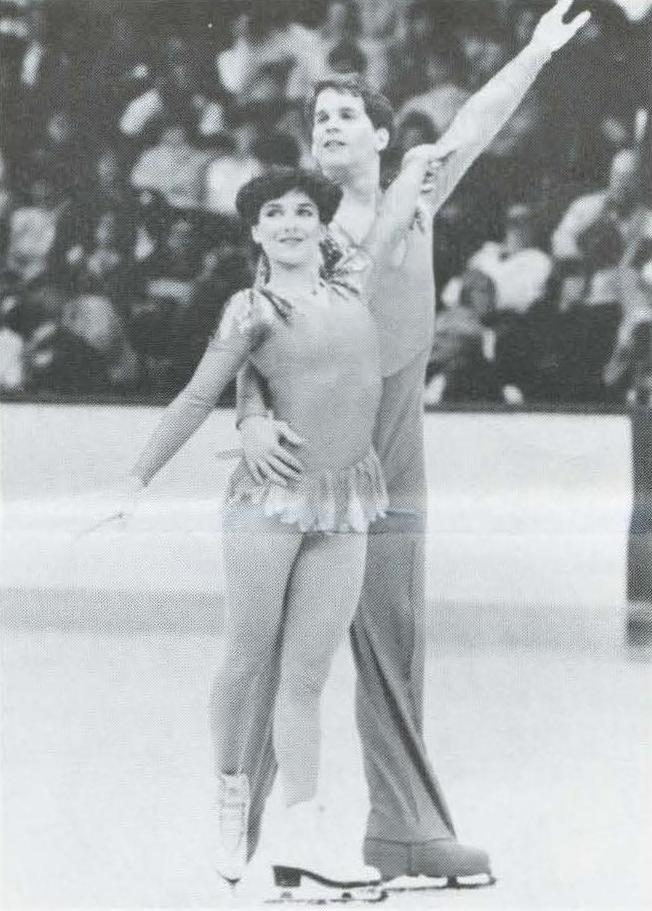
- Waggoner with Gillian Wachsman circa 1986

Personal information
- Full name: Todd Eric Waggoner
- Born: December 24, 1965 (age 60) Arlington Heights, Illinois, U.S.
- Height: 5 ft 10 in (1.78 m)

Figure skating career
- Country: United States
- Retired: 1988

Todd Eric Waggoner (born December 24, 1965) is an American former pair skater. With Gillian Wachsman, he is the 1985 NHK Trophy champion, 1985 Skate America bronze medalist, and 1986 U.S. national champion. The pair competed at the 1988 Winter Olympics, placing fifth, and at three World Championships, placing as high as fourth.

== Skating career ==
Early in his career, Waggoner competed with his sister, Jan. They moved from Chicago to Delaware to train with Ronald Ludington. The pair placed fourth on the junior level at the 1984 U.S. Championships.

Waggoner teamed up with Gillian Wachsman in the autumn of 1984. In their first season together, they took the bronze medal at the U.S. Championships. The following season, the pair won bronze at the 1985 Skate America, gold at the 1985 NHK Trophy, and then gold at the 1986 U.S. Championships ahead of Jill Watson / Peter Oppegard. They were assigned to their first World Championships and finished seventh. The pair was coached by Pauline Williams.

After winning silver at the 1988 U.S. Championships, Wachsman/Waggoner were selected to represent the United States at the 1988 Winter Olympics. The pair placed fifth in Calgary. Their final amateur competition was the 1988 World Championships where they placed fourth. They retired in order to focus on their educations.

== Personal life and aviation career ==
Waggoner was born on December 24, 1965, in Arlington Heights, Illinois. His father worked for Trans World Airlines.

During his skating career, Waggoner worked as a waiter and landscaper and took flying lessons. After studying at Embry–Riddle Aeronautical University, he flew cargo aircraft for the Delaware National Guard and then became a jet pilot for United Airlines. He lives in Annapolis, Maryland and is married to American former ice dancer, Kristan Lowery, with whom he has 3 sons, Eric, Kyle, and Drew.

== Results ==
=== With Gillian Wachsman ===
International
Event	1984–85	1985–86	1986–87	1987–88
Winter Olympics				5th
World Championships		7th	7th	4th
Skate America		3rd		
NHK Trophy		1st		2nd
National
U.S. Championships	3rd	1st	2nd	2nd

=== With Jan Waggoner ===
International
Event	1983	1984
U.S. Championships	6th J	4th J
J = Junior level
