= Battle of the Carmens =

1988 Olympic figure skating rivalry

The Battle of the Carmens is an informal name given to a figure skating rivalry and "media-fed battle" between East German Katarina Witt and American Debi Thomas during the 1988 Winter Olympics in Calgary. The competition is so named because both Witt and Thomas independently elected to skate to the music of Bizet's opera Carmen in their respective long programs. Both skaters had performed very well at the 1987 World Figure Skating Championships (Witt won, with Thomas placing a close second), so it was expected that the duel for Olympic gold in 1988 would constitute a showdown between these two women.

The Battle of the Carmens was one of two such "battles" at the 1988 Winter Olympics, the other being the "Battle of the Brians." Heading into the long program, which was worth 50% of the total score, Thomas was in first place (she placed second in compulsory figures and second in the short program) and Witt was in second place (she placed third in compulsory figures and first in the short program). However, both Thomas and Witt had underwhelming free skates. Despite omitting one of the more challenging jumps in her already technically inferior program, Witt skated well enough for the gold, but Thomas made significant mistakes in three of her planned jumps, bobbling her opening combination jump and falling on jump later on in the program, and came in third place overall.

As figure skating historian James R. Hines reported, Witt "presented a dramatic presentation of the seductive Carmen" from the judges and earned a high score, including seven 5.9s. Hines also said that Thomas, who skated last, was "not at her best" and that her nonliteral interpretation of Carmen did not have the same dramatic portrayal as Witt's version of Carmen. Canadian Elizabeth Manley won the silver medal over Thomas. The only standing ovations given were to Elizabeth Manley and Japanese skater Midori Ito, both of whom skated clean long programs which were more technically difficult than either Witt's or Thomas's long programs.

Thomas wore a unitard while performing, after which a skirts-only costume rule for women was instituted later in 1988. The International Skating Union costume rule from 1988 to 2004 stated amongst other things: "Ladies must wear a skirt. The ladies dress must not give the effect of excessive nudity inappropriate for an athletic sport." However, since 2004 the International Skating Union has allowed women to wear trousers instead of skirts in figure skating competition if they wish.

== See also ==
- Figure skating at the 1988 Winter Olympics
- Witt explains her victory in the Battle of the Carmens
