= Debi Thomas =

American figure skater (born 1967)

Personal information
- Full name: Debra Janine Thomas
- Born: March 25, 1967 (age 59) Poughkeepsie, New York, U.S.
- Height: 5 ft 6 in (1.67 m)

Figure skating career
- Country: United States
- Skating club: Los Angeles Figure Skating Club
- Retired: 1988
Medal record
Figure skating: Ladies' singles
Representing the United States
Olympic Games
Bronze medal – third place	1988 Calgary	Ladies' singles
World Championships
Gold medal – first place	1986 Geneva	Ladies' singles
Silver medal – second place	1987 Cincinnati	Ladies' singles
Bronze medal – third place	1988 Budapest	Ladies' singles

Debra Janine Thomas (born March 25, 1967) is an American figure skater and physician. She is the 1986 World champion, the 1988 Olympic bronze medalist, and a two-time U.S. national champion. Her rivalry with East Germany's Katarina Witt at the 1988 Calgary Olympics was known as the Battle of the Carmens.

== Early life ==
Thomas was born in Poughkeepsie, New York, and grew up in San Jose, California. Her parents divorced when she was young. Her mother worked as a computer programming analyst in Sunnyvale, California.

== Skating career ==
Thomas started skating at age 5 in San Jose. She competed in her first figure skating competition at age 9, finishing in first place. From then on, she was hooked on competitive skating. She attributes most of her success to her mother who sacrificed to drive her over 100 miles a day between home, school, and the ice rink.

As a young child, Thomas was coached by Barbara Toigo Vitkovits at Eastridge Mall in San Jose. At age 10, Thomas was introduced to Scottish skating coach Alex McGowan. In 1983, she began to represent the Los Angeles Figure Skating Club, which launched her career. McGowan would remain her coach until she retired from amateur competition at age 21.

Thomas placed fifth in the World Championships in 1985 and won gold in 1986. The eighteen-year-old won the short program and landed four triple jumps to place second in the long program, enough to win the overall competition. Thomas had also won the U.S. national title besides the World Championship that year; these achievements earned Thomas the ABC's Wide World of Sports Athlete of the Year award that year. She was the first female athlete to win those titles while attending college full-time since Tenley Albright in the 1950s. She was the first African-American to hold U.S. National titles in ladies' singles figure skating. Thomas was a pre-med student at Stanford University during this time, although it was unusual for a top U.S. skater to go to college at the same time as competing. In 1986, she received a Candace Award for Trailblazing from the National Coalition of 100 Black Women.

In 1987, Thomas suffered with Achilles tendinitis in both ankles and struggled at the U.S. Nationals, placing second to Jill Trenary. She rebounded at the World Championships, finishing a close second to East German skater Katarina Witt.

Thomas relocated to Boulder, Colorado, in the winter of 1987–88 to prepare for the Olympics. In January 1988, she reclaimed the U.S. national title. At the 1988 Winter Olympics held in Calgary, she and Katarina Witt engaged in a rivalry that the media dubbed the "Battle of the Carmens", as both women skated their long programs to the music of Georges Bizet's opera Carmen. Thomas' Carmen program consisted of "big powerful jumps", fast spins in strong positions, Spanish steps that were sharply accented, an uplifted torso, and straight, clean lines as expressed in her arms and legs. According to figure skater writer and historian Ellyn Kestnbaum, Thomas presented in her program an outer-directed focus and the image of a powerful and confident woman "taking command of the space around her by moving forth into it". In Thomas' short program, she used techno dance music and wore "a form-fitting skirtless unitard that showed off both her long lines and her musculature". It also included "big jumps", as well as "a high-energy step sequence involving angled limbs, shoulder isolations, and syncopated rhythms". Kestnabum suggests that Thomas' use of contemporary urban dance forms in her short program evoked images of her African American culture and heritage.

Thomas skated strong compulsory figures and performed well in the short program to an instrumental version of "Something in My House" by Dead or Alive. In her free skating program, she made mistakes on a number of jumps and placed fourth in that segment of the competition. Thomas began with a triple toe-triple toe combination, which was rare for a female skater in the 1980s. The second triple was not perfect and by her own admission, Thomas gave up on the rest of the program. Overall, she finished third and won the bronze medal, behind Witt and Canadian skater Elizabeth Manley (Thomas fell from first place going into the long program to third place overall in the final standings). By winning the bronze medal, Thomas became the first black athlete to win any medal at the Winter Olympics.

Thomas won the bronze medal at the 1988 World Championships and then retired from amateur skating. She performed for Stars on Ice and won the 1988 World Professional Championships in Landover, Maryland. She won the title again in both 1989 and 1991.

In February 1989, Thomas ranked 12th in the Q Score athlete standings, the only woman in the top 22. She was inducted into the U.S. Figure Skating Hall of Fame in 2000. She was also selected by President George W. Bush to be part of the U.S. Delegation for the Opening Ceremonies of the 2006 Winter Olympics in Turin, Italy along with other former Olympians: Dorothy Hamill, Eric Heiden, Kerri Strug, and Herschel Walker. Thomas returned to the ice briefly to participate in "The Caesars Tribute: A Salute to the Golden Age of American Skating", an event which featured many of the greatest legends and icons of American figure skating.

Thomas returned to competition in October 2023 at the World Figure and Fancy Skating Championships in Lake Placid, New York. She placed second in the ladies figure championship and seventh in ladies fancy skating.

== Medical career ==
Thomas expressed interest in becoming a doctor from an early age. She studied at Stanford University during her competitive career until her move to Boulder, Colorado, during the 1987–88 season, and had resumed her studies by 1989. She graduated from Stanford in 1991 with a degree in engineering and then from the Northwestern University Feinberg School of Medicine in 1997. Thomas followed this with a surgical residency at the University of Arkansas Medical Sciences Hospital and an orthopedic surgery residency at the Martin Luther King Jr./Charles Drew University Medical Center in South Central Los Angeles.

Thomas went on to become a practicing orthopedic surgeon specializing in hip and knee replacement. In June 2005, she graduated from the Orthopedic Residency Program at Charles R. Drew University in Los Angeles. She spent the next year preparing for Step I of the American Board of Orthopedic Surgeons' exam and working at King-Drew Medical Center as a junior-attending-physician specialist. In July 2006, she began a one-year fellowship at the Dorr Arthritis Institute at Centinela Hospital in Inglewood, California, for sub-specialty training in adult-reconstructive surgery. In September 2007, she began working at Carle Clinic in Urbana, Illinois. During her medical career, while she was skilled at doing the procedures and well-liked by patients, she had difficulty working with other doctors due to bipolar disorder; she went from clinic to clinic, never staying longer than one year.

As of December 2010, Thomas was in private practice at ORTHO X-cellence Debra J. Thomas, MD, PC in Richlands, Virginia, which had ceased operations as of 2016.

== Personal life ==
Thomas, a member of Alpha Kappa Alpha sorority, married Brian Vanden Hogen on March 15, 1988, in Boulder, Colorado. After their relationship ended, she married a sports attorney, Chris Bequette, in autumn 1996. Before divorcing, they had a son named Luc Bequette (b. 1997), who, as of 2021, played defensive tackle for UC Berkeley.

Thomas was diagnosed with bipolar disorder by April 2012. In November 2015, it was reported that she was living in a bed bug-infested trailer in the Appalachian Mountains with her fiancé who was struggling with anger and alcohol issues. Thomas stated that she was "broke", having lost most of her savings through her two divorces and failed medical practice, and had lost custody of her son when he was 13. She was featured in the November 7, 2015, episode of the television series Iyanla: Fix My Life on the Oprah Winfrey Network. As of 2016, Thomas and fiancé Jamie Looney were living with Looney's two sons, Ethan and Austin, in southwest Virginia.

Thomas currently lives and trains in Florida.

== Programs ==
Season	Short program	Free skating	Exhibition
1987–1988	Something in My House by Dead or Alive	Carmen by Georges Bizet	

== Competitive highlights ==
Amateur career

International
Event	1982–83	1983–84	1984–85	1985–86	1986–87	1987–88
Winter Olympics						3rd
World Champ.			5th	1st	2nd	3rd
Skate America				1st		
Skate Canada						1st
NHK Trophy			2nd			
St. Ivel				1st		
Nebelhorn Trophy			1st			
St. Gervais			1st			
National
U.S. Champ.	13th	6th	2nd	1st	2nd	1st

Professional career

Event	1988	1989	1991
World Professional Championships	1st	1st	1st
