= Brian Boitano =

United States figure skater (born 1963)

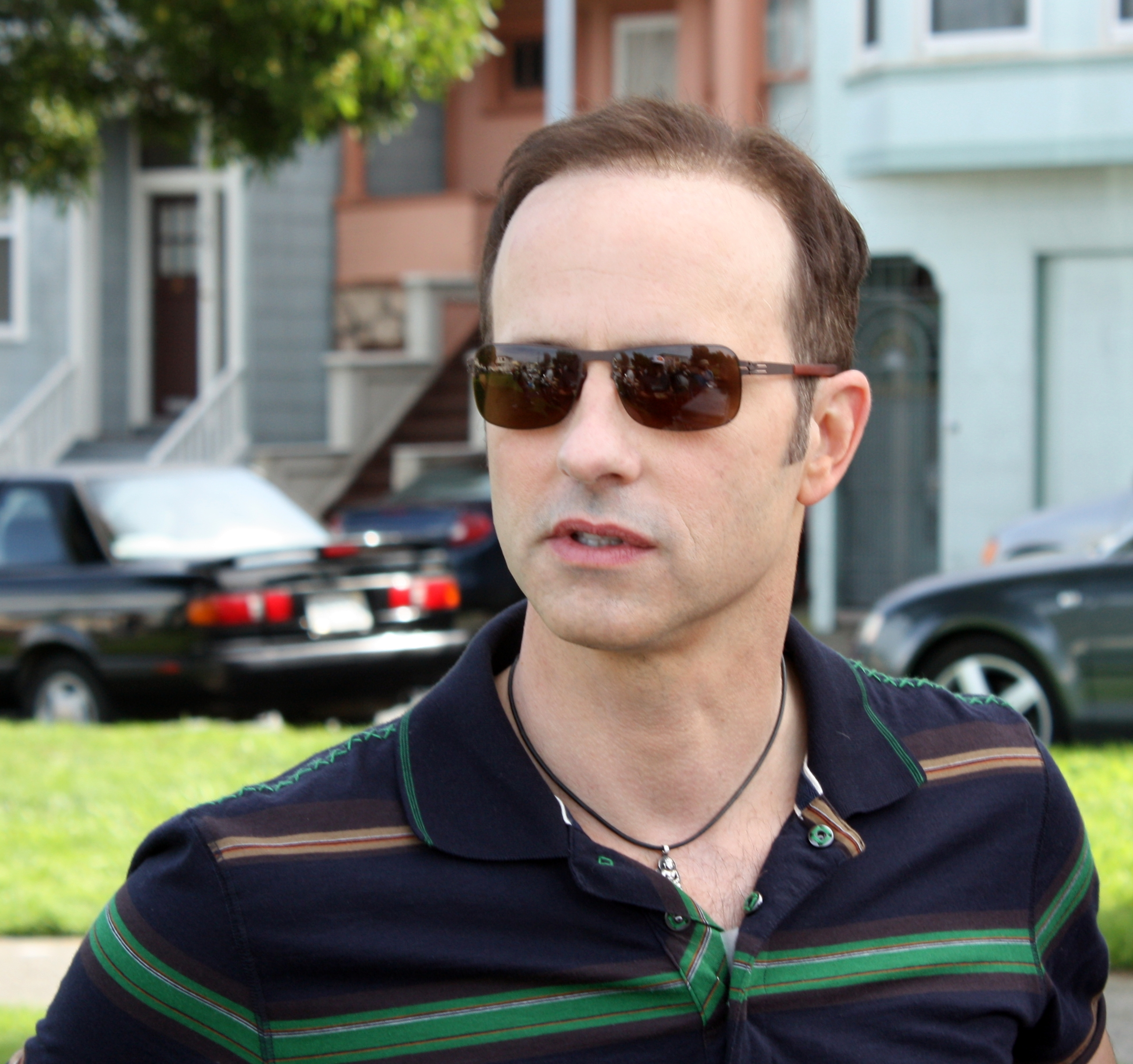
- Boitano in 2010

Personal information
- Full name: Brian Anthony Boitano
- Born: October 22, 1963 (age 63) Mountain View, California, U.S.
- Height: 5 ft 11 in (180 cm)

Figure skating career
- Country: United States
- Discipline: Men's singles
- Retired: 1988, 1994
Olympic Games
Gold medal – first place	1988 Calgary	Singles
World Championships
Gold medal – first place	1986 Geneva	Singles
Gold medal – first place	1988 Budapest	Singles
Silver medal – second place	1987 Cincinnati	Singles
Bronze medal – third place	1985 Tokyo	Singles
U.S. Championships
Gold medal – first place	1985 Kansas City	Singles
Gold medal – first place	1986 Uniondale	Singles
Gold medal – first place	1987 Tacoma	Singles
Gold medal – first place	1988 Denver	Singles
Silver medal – second place	1983 Pittsburgh	Singles
Silver medal – second place	1984 Salt Lake City	Singles
Silver medal – second place	1994 Detroit	Singles
World Junior Championships
Bronze medal – third place	1978 Megève	Singles

Brian Anthony Boitano (born October 22, 1963) is an American figure skater from Sunnyvale, California. He is the 1988 Olympic champion, the 1986 and 1988 World Champion, and the 1985–1988 U.S. National Champion.

Boitano turned professional following the 1988 season. Under new rules by the ISU, he returned to competition in 1993 and competed at the 1994 Winter Olympics, where he placed sixth. In 1996, he was inducted into the World Figure Skating Hall of Fame and the United States Figure Skating Hall of Fame.

== Early life ==
Brian Boitano was born in 1963 and raised in Mountain View, California. Boitano is a graduate of Marian A. Peterson High School in Sunnyvale, California. He is of Italian American descent, with family from northern Italy. As an adult, he has lived in San Francisco.

== Figure skating career ==
=== Early career ===
Beginning skating as a child, Brian Boitano won a gold medal at the Junior U.S. Championships in 1978 and first made his mark on the international scene when he won the bronze medal at the 1978 World Junior Figure Skating Championships, beating future rival Brian Orser for that medal.

Early in his career, Boitano was known primarily for his jumping. He, along with several other skaters, helped push the technical envelope of men's skating. In 1982, Boitano became the first American to land a triple Axel. In 1987, he introduced his signature jump, the 'Boitano triple Lutz', in which the skater raises his left arm above his head. He attempted a quadruple jump throughout the 1986–87 season and at the 1988 World Figure Skating Championships, but did not cleanly land the jump; he double-footed the landing on two occasions.

At the 1983 World Championships, he became the first skater to ever land all six triple jumps in competition. He would eventually include and successfully land eight triple jumps in his free skate program, the maximum number possible (see Zayak rule). He would jump two flip jumps and two triple Axels to compete with his rival, Brian Orser, who jumped one triple flip and one triple Axel. It was not until failing to defend his World title in 1987 that Boitano focused specifically on improving his artistry. Toward this end, he worked with renowned choreographer Sandra Bezic.

Boitano placed second at the 1984 United States Figure Skating Championships, earning a place in the 1984 Winter Olympics. He placed 5th at the Olympics, setting the stage for his success over the next four years.

=== World Champion ===
Following the 1984 Olympics, several skaters emerged as likely medal hopes following the retirement of Scott Hamilton.

Boitano won the 1985 United States Figure Skating Championships, the first of his four titles. At the first World Championships of the post-Hamilton era in 1985, Alexander Fadeev won, with Brian Orser finishing in second place and Boitano in third place. He had injured tendons in his right ankle a few weeks before the 1986 U.S. Championships but went on to win his second national title. At the 1986 World Championships, Boitano took the title, while Fadeev had a disastrous free skate despite having been in an excellent position to win; Orser finished in second place once again.

During the 1986–87 season, Boitano had introduced three new elements to his programs: the 'Tano triple lutz and a quadruple toe loop, as well as wearing a blindfold, although he never succeeded in landing a clean quadruple jump in competition. The 1987 World Championships were held in Cincinnati, giving the defending world champion a home-field advantage. The outcome of the event would set the tone for the 1988 Olympics. He fell on his quadruple toe loop attempt and placed second.

After losing the world title to Orser at home, Boitano and his coach Linda Leaver decided that some changes needed to be made if he was to become the Olympic champion. He had always been good at the technical requirements ("The first mark"), but he was weak on the artistic ("the second mark"). He was a self-described "jumping robot." In order to help his growth as an artist, he hired choreographer Sandra Bezic to choreograph his programs for the 1987–1988 Olympic season.

Bezic choreographed two programs that featured clean lines and accentuated the skating abilities of the 5' 11" Boitano. The short program was based on Giacomo Meyerbeer's ballet Les Patineurs, in which he plays a cocky young man showing off his tricks, using movements dating to the 19th century. In one moment, he wipes ice shavings, also called snow, off his skate blade and tosses it over his shoulder after landing a triple Axel combination. The free skating program was based on the film score, Napoleon, detailing various phases of a soldier's life.

Boitano debuted his new programs at 1987 Skate Canada, held in the Saddledome in Calgary, Alberta, Canada. This was where he would compete against Brian Orser for the Olympic title three months later. His new programs were received with standing ovations by the audience. Although Orser won the competition, Boitano skated clean, landing seven triple jumps, including a footwork section into a jump, but popped his planned second triple Axel. The team was so confident about the strength of his new programs that they omitted the quadruple toe loop which, if landed, could have put him a shoulder above Orser in technical merit.

The short program at the 1988 United States Figure Skating Championships proved to be a highlight. Boitano received marks of 6.0 from eight of the nine judges for presentation, the second mark. His free skate was flawed. Due to delays, he did not skate until after midnight. Still, he won the competition, and went into the Olympics as the national champion (U.S.), as did Orser (representing Canada).

=== 1988 Olympics: Battle of the Brians ===
Going into the Olympics, Boitano and Brian Orser each had won a world title and each had a balanced repertoire. Boitano was known as the slightly better technician and Orser as the better artist. Adding to the rivalry, Boitano and Orser were both performing military-themed programs. Boitano's free skate was set to music from Napoleon and Josephine, the television miniseries. For his free skate, Boitano wore a blue stretch suit with red braids and epaulets, and used military gestures and postures as much as his music allowed.

The Battle of the Brians at the 1988 Winter Olympics was the highlight of Boitano's amateur career. Boitano and Orser were effectively tied going into the free skating portion of the event and whoever won that portion would win the event. Alexander Fadeev had won the compulsory figures section of the competition, with Boitano second and Orser third. In the short program, Orser placed first and Boitano second. The free skating was, at the time, worth 50% of the score, and so Boitano's lead would not be enough to hold him in first place if he lost the free skate.

Boitano skated a clean, technically excellent long program, with eight triple jumps, including two axels, and a triple flip-triple toe loop combination. Landing his second triple axel jump cleanly was probably a critical factor in the battle. Orser made one small mistake on a jump and omitted his planned second triple axel. Boitano won the battle in a 5–4 split. It was later discovered that the Canadian Figure Skating Association had engaged in "vote trading" with several countries on the judging panel, particularly East Germany and the USSR. This ultimately backfired, as the Soviet judge refused to follow this agreement and voting "with his conscience," placing Boitano first. Had he followed his federation's directive, Boitano would have lost the gold medal. The judge was promptly suspended by his federation. Experts questioned why the scores were so close between the two skaters because Boitano had two triple axels, two triple flips and a triple triple combination, elements that were not included in Orser's program.

With his win, Boitano became the first Olympic champion to land the full complement of six types of triple jumps. Boitano won the gold medal, wearing skates with American flag appliqués. These are now part of the collections of the National Museum of American History at the Smithsonian Institution.

Following the Olympics, both Orser and Boitano went to the 1988 World Championships, which Boitano won.

=== Professional career and return to amateur standing ===
Following the Olympics, Boitano went on to dominate competitions in the professional ranks, winning ten straight professional competitions, including five consecutive World Professional Championship titles and four consecutive wins at the Challenge of Champions. Boitano also appeared in Carmen on Ice, for which he won an Emmy. He performed with Champions on Ice for many years. He wanted to return to amateur competition and make another run at the Olympics.

In June 1993, the International Skating Union (ISU) introduced a clause, commonly known as the "Boitano rule," which allowed professionals to reinstate as "amateur" or "eligible" skaters. Many others joined Boitano, including Ukrainian Viktor Petrenko, 1988 bronze medalist and 1992 gold medalist. The ISU decision was the result of Boitano's active involvement during the early 1990s, when the International Olympic Committee lifted the remaining limits on athletes' remuneration. Previously, the committee had been accused of rejecting Western professionals, while allowing Eastern Bloc state-sponsored "amateurs" to compete. Boitano reinstated as an amateur to compete in the 1994 Winter Olympics in Lillehammer, Norway.

Boitano competed at the 1994 United States Figure Skating Championships, led after the short program, but lost to Scott Davis in the long program in a 6–3 split decision. Boitano was named to the Olympic team. Going into the Olympics as a medal favorite in a strong field, Boitano missed his triple Axel combination during the short program for the first time in his career. This mistake proved extremely costly, and knocked Boitano out of medal contention. He skated a good long program and finished 6th.

Boitano returned to the professional ranks afterward. In 1996 he was inducted into the World Figure Skating Hall of Fame and the United States Figure Skating Hall of Fame.

== Personal life ==
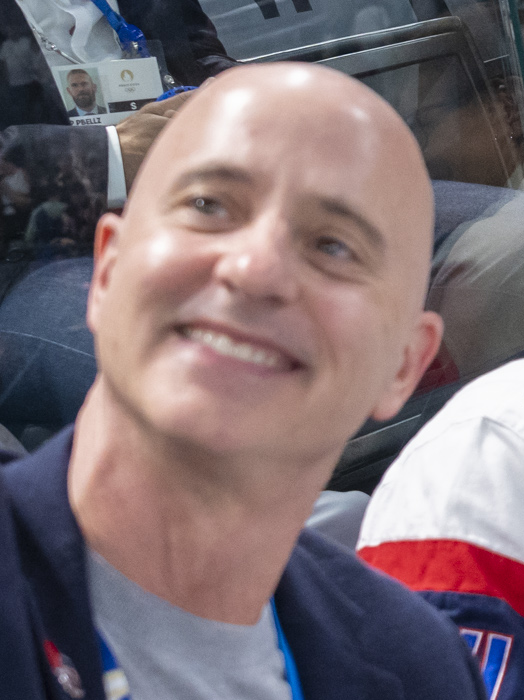
Brian Boitano at the 2024 Summer Olympics in Paris, France

In December 2013, Boitano was named to the United States delegation to the 2014 Winter Olympics in Sochi, Russia. In conjunction with that appointment, Boitano publicly came out as gay.

The Sochi games and Russia were the targets of criticism and LGBT activism because of a Russian anti-gay "propaganda" law passed in June 2013. In January 2014, Boitano told the Associated Press that he had never wanted to come out until he was named to the delegation.

Boitano's older brother, Mark Boitano, is a real estate agent and former politician. He served as a member of the New Mexico Senate from 1997 to 2013.

== Celebrity and popular culture career ==
=== South Park song ===
A caricature of Boitano as a superhero appears as a semi-recurring character in the cartoon series South Park. The film South Park: Bigger, Longer & Uncut (1999) features a musical number titled "What Would Brian Boitano Do?". He was also featured in Jesus vs. Santa.

=== Food Network show ===
On August 23, 2009, Food Network debuted a new series entitled What Would Brian Boitano Make?, which borrows both its name and opening musical theme from the South Park: Bigger, Longer & Uncut song. The show features Boitano preparing meals for his friends. The series was picked up for a ten-episode second season.

=== Other television and film appearances ===
- Boitano starred, along with Katarina Witt and archrival Brian Orser, in the 1990 German dance film Carmen on Ice; Boitano played Don Jose. All three won an Emmy Award for "Outstanding performance in classical music/dance programming".
- He was featured in the Super Bowl XXVI halftime show "Winter Magic", along with Gloria Estefan and Dorothy Hamill.
- Boitano had a cameo in the 2007 film Blades of Glory as a world skating federation judge.
- He and fellow figure skater Michelle Kwan had a cameo as themselves in the 2005 Disney film, Ice Princess, appearing as commentators during the Sectionals competition.
- He appeared on Giada at Home for one episode.
- He appeared as a guest judge on Top Chef Masters, Season 4 episode 3. The episode is titled "What would Brian Boitano Make?"
- He appeared on Fox Business Network's Stossel, episode "Spontaneous Order" (February 10, 2011).
- He appeared in an episode of Check, Please! Bay Area, a restaurant review program which airs on KQED-TV in San Francisco.
- He hosted a series on HGTV, called The Brian Boitano Project, which premiered January 16, 2014, in which he purchased a near derelict ancestral home in Northern Italy, home to many Boitanos. During the series he gives the home in Favale di Malvaro a sympathetic restoration/renovation and shops flea markets with two nieces to find decor and furnishings. Local artisans, carpenters, masons and painters create a gem where he can live part-time and host Boitanos from afar.
- Boitano appeared as a guest on Season 18 of the reality series Hell's Kitchen, where he along with Gordon Ramsay and Traci Des Jardins co-judged the team challenge in the episode "Hell Freezes Over".

== Programs ==
Season	Short program	Free skating	Exhibition
1993–1994	Carousel Waltz; Richard Rodgers	Appalachian Spring/Lincoln Portrait by Aaron Copland	Elegy For Harp And Strings; Lee Holdridge
1987–1988	Les Patineurs (Meyerbeer)	Silent movie Napoleon (Carmine Coppola / Francis Ford Coppola)	Adventures of Don Juan from the Errol Flynn movie Parlami d'amore Mariu (Italian love song)

== Results ==
International
Event	77–78	78–79	79–80	80–81	81–82	82–83	83–84	84–85	85–86	86–87	87–88	93–94
Olympics							5th				1st	6th
Worlds						7th	6th	3rd	1st	2nd	1st	
Skate America					3rd		1st		2nd	1st		2nd
Skate Canada						1st					2nd	
NHK Trophy								3rd	1st			
St. Ivel								1st				
Nebelhorn			3rd									
St. Gervais			3rd									
International: Junior
Junior Worlds	3rd											
National
U.S. Champ.	1st J	8th	5th	4th	4th	2nd	2nd	1st	1st	1st	1st	2nd
