= Figure skating at the 1988 Winter Olympics =

Figure skating at the XV Olympic Winter Games
- Type: Olympic Games
- Venue: Olympic Saddledome (finals); Stampede Corral (short program); Father David Bauer Olympic Arena (compulsory figures)

Champions
- Men's singles: (United States) Brian Boitano
- Ladies' singles: (East Germany) Katarina Witt
- Pairs: (Soviet Union) Ekaterina Gordeeva / Sergei Grinkov
- Ice dance: (Soviet Union) Natalia Bestemianova / Andrei Bukin
- Previous: 1984 Winter Olympics
- Next: 1992 Winter Olympics

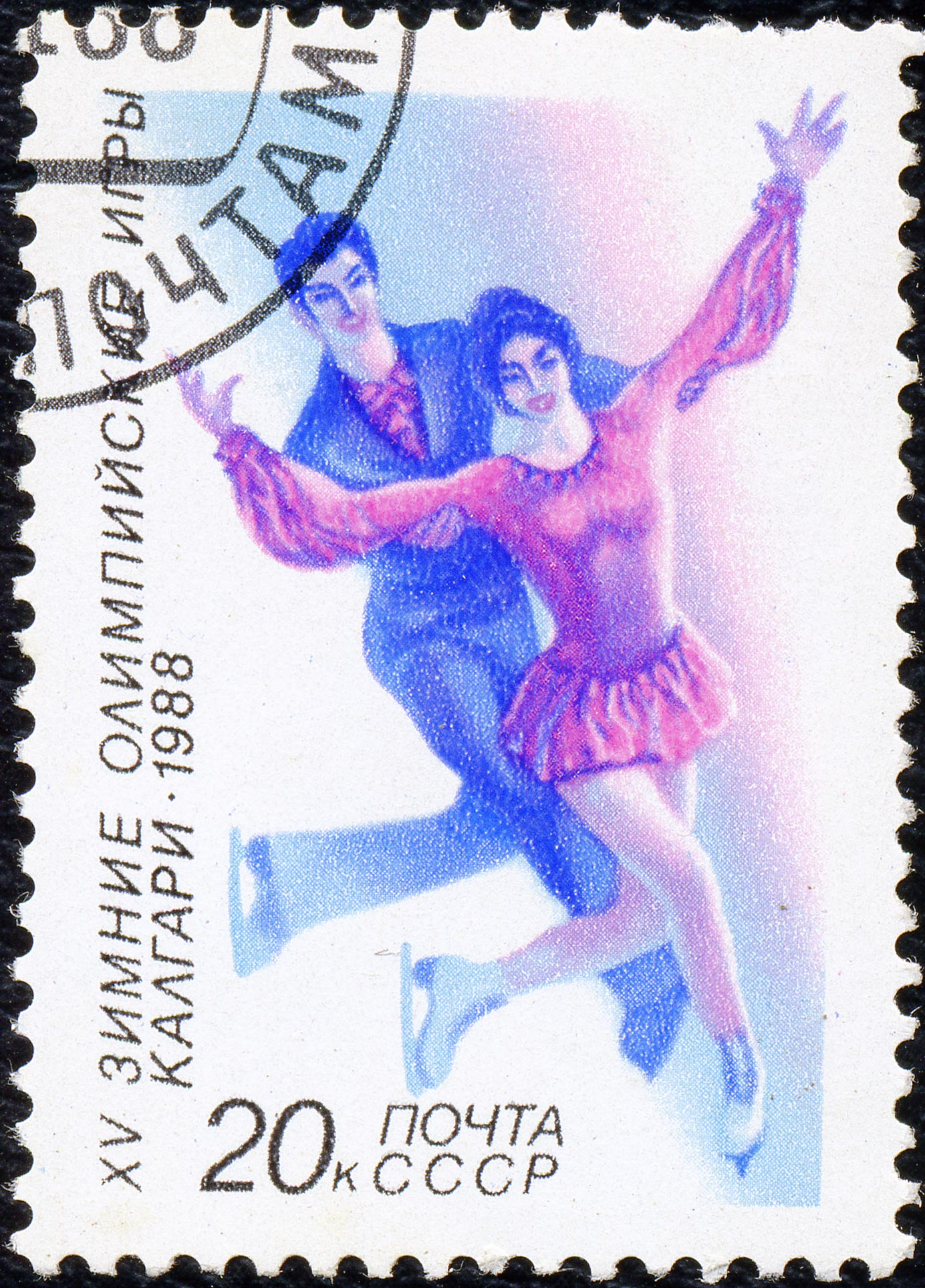
Figure skating at the 1988 Winter Olympics on a Russian Soviet stamp

Figure skating at the 1988 Winter Olympics took place at the Stampede Corral, the Olympic Saddledome and the Father David Bauer Olympic Arena in Calgary, Alberta, Canada. This was the last Olympic competition where compulsory figures were contested for the men's and ladies' events.

== Medal table ==
Rank	Nation	Gold	Silver	Bronze	Total
1	Soviet Union	2	2	1	5
2	United States	1	0	2	3
3	East Germany	1	0	0	1
4	Canada	0	2	1	3
Totals (4 entries)		4	4	4	12

=== Participating NOCs ===
Twenty-five nations sent figure skaters to compete in the events at Calgary.

- Australia
- Austria
- Belgium
- Bulgaria
- Canada
- China
- Czechoslovakia
- Chinese Taipei
- East Germany
- France
- Great Britain
- Hungary
- Italy
- Japan
- Mexico
- North Korea
- Poland
- South Korea
- Soviet Union
- Spain
- Sweden
- Switzerland
- United States
- West Germany
- Yugoslavia

== Results ==
=== Men ===
Rank	Name	Nation	CF	SP	FS	TFP
1	Brian Boitano	United States	2	2	1	3.0
2	Brian Orser	Canada	3	1	2	4.2
3	Viktor Petrenko	Soviet Union	6	3	3	7.8
4	Alexander Fadeev	Soviet Union	1	9	4	8.2
5	Grzegorz Filipowski	Poland	7	4	5	10.8
6	Vladimir Kotin	Soviet Union	5	6	8	13.4
7	Christopher Bowman	United States	8	5	7	13.8
8	Kurt Browning	Canada	11	7	6	15.4
9	Heiko Fischer	West Germany	4	11	10	16.8
10	Paul Wylie	United States	12	8	9	19.4
11	Richard Zander	West Germany	9	17	11	23.2
12	Oliver Höner	Switzerland	10	10	14	24.0
13	Petr Barna	Czechoslovakia	15	15	12	27.0
14	Lars Dresler	Denmark	14	12	15	28.2
15	Axel Médéric	France	13	14	17	30.4
16	Neil Paterson	Canada	17	13	16	31.4
17	Makoto Kano	Japan	19	19	13	32.0
18	Paul Robinson	Great Britain	16	21	18	36.0
19	Cameron Medhurst	Australia	18	16	20	37.2
20	Zhang Shubin	China	22	18	19	39.4
21	Alessandro Riccitelli	Italy	20	20	22	42.0
22	Jung Sung-Il	South Korea	24	24	21	45.0
23	Michael Huth	East Germany	21	25	23	45.6
24	Peter Johansson	Sweden	23	22	24	46.6
Free skate not reached
25	David Liu	Chinese Taipei	25	23		
26	Boyko Aleksiev	Bulgaria	26	27		
27	Riccardo Olavarrieta	Mexico	28	26		
28	Ho Kang	North Korea	27	28		

Free skating final standings (top 8)

Rank	Name	Figures	SP	(Socialist Federal Republic of Yugoslavia)	(Germany)	(France)	(United States)	(East Germany)	(Sweden)	(Soviet Union)	(Czechoslovakia)	(Canada)	Fract. Places
1	(United States) Brian Boitano	2	2	2	1	1	1	1	1	2	2	2	3.0
2	(Canada) Brian Orser	3	1	1	2	2	2	2	2	1	1	1	4.2
3	(Soviet Union) Viktor Petrenko	6	3	3	3	3	2	4	3	5	3	3	7.8
4	(Soviet Union) Aleksandr Fadeyev	1	9	4	4	4	4	3	4	3	4	4	8.2
5	(Poland) Grzegorz Filipowski	7	4	7	6	5	8	8	6	6	6	6	10.8
6	(Soviet Union) Vladimir Kotin	5	6	8	9	7	6	9	5	4	8	5	13.4
7	(United States) Christopher Bowman	8	5	5	5	8	7	5	8	8	5	8	13.8
8	(Canada) Kurt Browning	11	7	6	7	6	9	7	9	7	7	9	15.4

Referee:

- Sonia Bianchetti

Assistant referee:

- Benjamin T. Wright

Judges:

- (West Germany) Elfriede Beyer
- (United States) Janet G. Allen
- (Denmark) Linda Petersen
- (Soviet Union) Alexander Vedenin
- (Switzerland) Jacqueline Itschner
- (Japan) Junko Hiramatsu
- (East Germany) Günter Teichmann
- (Canada) Jean Matthews
- (Czechoslovakia) Gerhardt Bubník
- (Poland) Maria Zuchowicz (substitute)

=== Ladies ===
Katarina Witt became the first woman to repeat as champion since Sonja Henie.

Rank	Name	Nation	CF	SP	FS	TFP
1	Katarina Witt	East Germany	3	1	2	4.2
2	Elizabeth Manley	Canada	4	3	1	4.6
3	Debi Thomas	United States	2	2	4	6.0
4	Jill Trenary	United States	5	6	5	10.4
5	Midori Ito	Japan	10	4	3	10.6
6	Claudia Leistner	West Germany	6	9	6	13.2
7	Kira Ivanova	Soviet Union	1	10	9	13.6
8	Anna Kondrashova	Soviet Union	9	7	7	15.2
9	Simone Koch	East Germany	14	8	8	19.6
10	Marina Kielmann	West Germany	12	11	10	21.6
11	Beatrice Gelmini	Italy	15	17	11	26.8
12	Joanne Conway	Great Britain	8	18	16	28.0
13	Charlene Wong	Canada	18	14	13	29.4
14	Junko Yaginuma	Japan	16	15	14	29.6
15	Stéfanie Schmid	Switzerland	21	16	12	31.0
16	Agnès Gosselin	France	13	21	18	34.2
17	Katrien Pauwels	Belgium	11	20	20	34.6
18	Yvonne Gómez	Spain	17	19	17	34.8
19	Tamara Téglássy	Hungary	19	22	15	35.2
20	Iveta Voralová	Czechoslovakia	22	12	19	37.0
21	Lotta Falkenbäck	Sweden	25	13	21	41.2
22	Željka Čižmešija	Yugoslavia	20	25	22	44.0
23	Gina Fulton	Great Britain	24	24	23	47.0
WD	Caryn Kadavy	United States	7	5		
Free skate not reached
25	Tracy Brook	Australia	26	23		
26	Jiang Yibing	China	23	28		
27	Byun Sung-jin	South Korea	27	30		
28	Petya Gavazova	Bulgaria	30	26		
29	Pauline Lee	Chinese Taipei	29	29		
30	Diana Encinas	Mexico	28	31		
31	Kim Song-suk	North Korea	31	27		

Free skating final standings (top 8)

Rank	Name	Figures	SP	(Switzerland)	(United States)	(United Kingdom)	(Japan)	(East Germany)	(Germany)	(Soviet Union)	(Canada)	(Czechoslovakia)	Fract. Places
1	(East Germany) Katarina Witt	3	1	2	2	3	3	1	3	1	2	2	4.2
2	(Canada) Elizabeth Manley	4	3	1	1	1	1	2	1	2	1	1	4.6
3	(United States) Debi Thomas	2	2	5	4	5	4	5	4	4	4	5	6.0
4	(United States) Jill Trenary	5	6	4	5	4	5	4	5	5	5	4	10.4
5	(Japan) Midori Ito	10	4	3	3	2	2	3	2	3	3	3	10.6
6	(Germany) Claudia Leistner	6	9	6	6	6	8	6	6	8	6	6	13.2
7	(Soviet Union) Kira Ivanova	1	10	7	15	14	7	8	9	7	11	10	13.6
8	(Soviet Union) Anna Kondrashova	9	7	8	7	8	6	7	7	6	9	9	15.2

Referee:

- Donald H. Gilchrist

Assistant referee:

- Jürg Wilhelm

Judges:

- (Switzerland) Peter Moser
- (United States) Lucy C. Brennan
- (United Kingdom) Sally-Anne Stapleford
- (Japan) Kazuo Ohashi
- (East Germany) Reinhard Mirmseker
- (West Germany) Willi Wernz
- (Soviet Union) Sergei Kononykhin
- (Canada) Dennis McFarlane
- (Czechoslovakia) Vera Spurná
- (France) Monique Georgelin (substitute)

=== Pairs ===
During Watson and Oppegard's free skating, a photographer dropped his camera bag onto the ice and an usher walked onto the ice to pick it up while the pair was performing a death spiral on the other side of the rink.

Rank	Name	Nation	SP	FS	TFP
1	Ekaterina Gordeeva / Sergei Grinkov	Soviet Union	1	1	1.4
2	Elena Valova / Oleg Vasiliev	Soviet Union	2	2	2.8
3	Jill Watson / Peter Oppegard	United States	3	3	4.2
4	Larisa Selezneva / Oleg Makarov	Soviet Union	6	4	6.4
5	Gillian Wachsman / Todd Waggoner	United States	4	5	6.6
6	Denise Benning / Lyndon Johnston	Canada	5	7	9.0
7	Peggy Schwarz / Alexander König	East Germany	11	6	10.4
8	Christine Hough / Doug Ladret	Canada	8	8	11.2
9	Isabelle Brasseur / Lloyd Eisler	Canada	7	9	11.8
10	Natalie Seybold / Wayne Seybold	United States	10	10	14.0
11	Brigitte Groh / Holger Maletz	West Germany	13	11	16.2
12	Cheryl Peake / Andrew Naylor	Great Britain	12	12	16.8
13	Lisa Cushley / Neil Cushley	Great Britain	14	13	18.6
14	Mei Zhibin / Li Wei	China	15	14	20.0
WD	Lenka Knapová / René Novotný	Czechoslovakia	9	WD	

Free skating final standings (top 8)

Rank	Name	SP	(Soviet Union)	(Germany)	(United States)	(United Kingdom)	(Canada)	(Australia)	(Czechoslovakia)	(East Germany)	(Poland)	Fract. Places
1	(Soviet Union) Ekaterina Gordeeva / Sergei Grinkov	1	1	1	1	1	1	1	1	1	1	1.4
2	(Soviet Union) Elena Valova / Oleg Vasiliev	2	2	2	2	2	2	2	2	2	2	2.8
3	(United States) Jill Watson / Peter Oppegard	3	4	3	3	4	5	3	3	3	3	4.2
4	(Soviet Union) Larisa Selezneva / Oleg Makarov	6	3	5	6	6	3	4	4	4	4	6.4
5	(United States) Gillian Wachsman / Todd Waggoner	4	5	7	4	8	6	5	5	8	8	6.6
6	(Canada) Denise Benning / Lyndon Johnston	5	7	4	7	3	4	7	8	5	7	9.0
7	(East Germany) Peggy Schwarz / Alexander König	11	6	6	9	7	7	6	7	6	5	10.4
8	(Canada) Christine Hough / Doug Ladret	8	9	8	10	4	8	9	6	7	9	11.2

Referee:

- Elemér Terták

Assistant referee:

- Walburga Grimm

Judges:

- (Soviet Union) Mikhail Drei
- (West Germany) Elfriede Beyer
- (United States) Claire W. Ferguson
- (United Kingdom) Sally-Anne Stapleford
- (Canada) Suzanne Francis
- (Australia) Shirley Taylor
- (Czechoslovakia) Gerhardt Bubník
- (East Germany) Günter Teichmann
- (Poland) Maria Zuchowicz
- (Japan) Junko Hiramatsu (substitute)

=== Ice dance ===
Rank	Name	Nation	CD	OD	FD	TFP
1	Natalia Bestemianova / Andrei Bukin	Soviet Union	1	1	1	2.0
2	Marina Klimova / Sergei Ponomarenko	Soviet Union	2	2	2	4.0
3	Tracy Wilson / Robert McCall	Canada	3	3	3	6.0
4	Natalia Annenko / Genrikh Sretenski	Soviet Union	4	4	4	8.0
5	Kathrin Beck / Christoff Beck	Austria	5	5	5	10.0
6	Suzanne Semanick / Scott Gregory	United States	6	6	6	12.0
7	Klára Engi / Attila Tóth	Hungary	7	7	7	14.0
8	Isabelle Duchesnay / Paul Duchesnay	France	8	8	8	16.0
9	Antonia Becherer / Ferdinand Becherer	West Germany	9	9	9	18.0
10	Lia Trovati / Roberto Pelizzola	Italy	10	10	10	20.0
11	Susan Wynne / Joseph Druar	United States	11	11	11	22.0
12	Karyn Garossino / Rodney Garossino	Canada	12	12	12	24.0
13	Sharon Jones / Paul Askham	Great Britain	13	13	13	26.0
14	Corinne Paliard / Didier Courtois	France	15	14	14	28.4
15	Viera Řeháková / Ivan Havránek	Czechoslovakia	14	15	15	29.6
16	Melanie Cole / Michael Farrington	Canada	16	16	16	32.0
17	Honorata Górna / Andrzej Dostatni	Poland	17	17	17	34.0
18	Tomoko Tanaka / Hiroyuki Suzuki	Japan	18	18	18	36.0
19	Liu Luyang / Zhao Xiaolei	China	19	19	19	38.0
20	Monica MacDonald / Rodney Clarke	Australia	20	20	20	40.0

Free dance final standings (top 8)

Rank	Name	CD	OD	(Soviet Union)	(Canada)	(United States)	(Germany)	(Italy)	(Austria)	(United Kingdom)	(Hungary)	(France)	Fract. Places
1	(Soviet Union) Natalia Bestemianova / Andrei Bukin	1	1	1	1	1	1	1	1	1	1	1	2.0
2	(Soviet Union) Marina Klimova / Sergei Ponomarenko	2	2	2	3	2	2	2	2	2	2	2	4.0
3	(Canada) Tracy Wilson / Robert McCall	3	3	3	2	3	3	3	3	3	3	3	6.0
4	(Soviet Union) Natalia Annenko / Genrikh Sretenski	4	4	4	4	6	4	4	4	4	4	4	8.0
5	(Austria) Kathrin Beck / Christoff Beck	5	5	5	5	5	5	5	5	6	5	5	10.0
6	(United States) Suzanne Semanick / Scott Gregory	6	6	6	8	7	6	6	6	7	6	7	12.0
7	(Hungary) Klára Engi / Attila Tóth	7	7	7	7	8	7	7	7	8	7	8	14.0
8	(France) Isabelle Duchesnay / Paul Duchesnay	8	8	10	6	4	9	8	10	5	10	5	16.0

Referee:

- Hans Kutschera

Assistant referee:

- Alexander Gorshkov

Judges:

- (Soviet Union) Irina Absaliamova
- (Canada) Ann Shaw
- (United States) Nancy Meiss
- (West Germany) Willi Wernz
- (Italy) Cia Bordogna
- (Austria) Heide Maritczak
- (United Kingdom) Roy Mason
- (Hungary) István Sugár
- (France) Daniel de Paix de Coeur
- (Poland) Maria Miller (substitute)

== See also ==
- Battle of the Brians
- Battle of the Carmens
