= Katarina Witt =

German figure skater (born 1965)

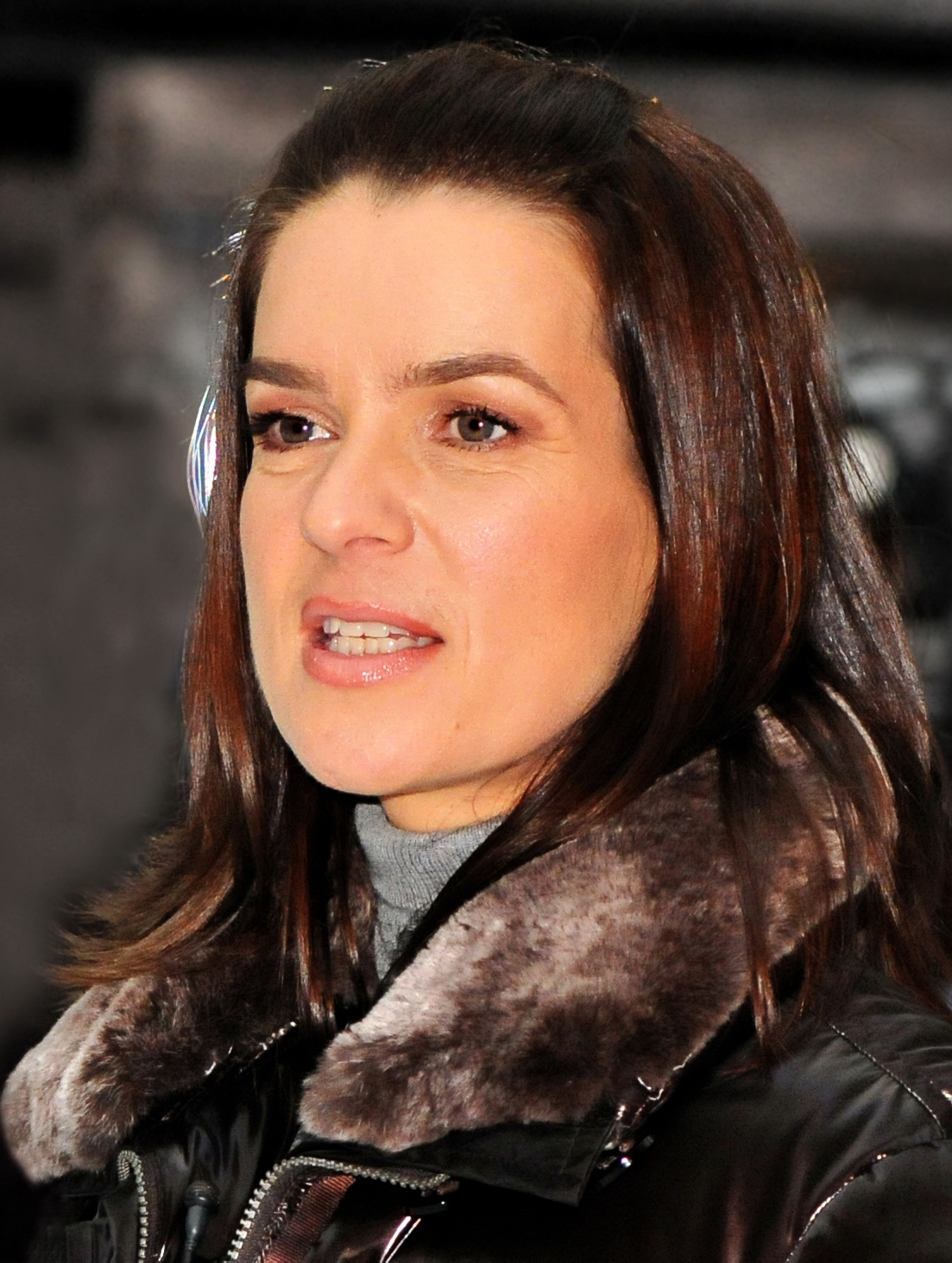
- Witt in 2010

Personal information
- Born: 3 December 1965 (age 60) Falkensee, East Germany
- Height: 1.65 m (5 ft 5 in)

Figure skating career
- Country: East Germany (1977–1988); Germany (1994)
- Skating club: SC Karl-Marx-Stadt
- Retired: 1988 and 1994 (amateur); 2008 (professional)
Medal record
Figure skating: Ladies' singles
Representing East Germany
Olympic Games
Gold medal – first place	1984 Sarajevo	Ladies' singles
Gold medal – first place	1988 Calgary	Ladies' singles
World Championships
Gold medal – first place	1984 Ottawa	Ladies' singles
Gold medal – first place	1985 Tokyo	Ladies' singles
Gold medal – first place	1987 Cincinnati	Ladies' singles
Gold medal – first place	1988 Budapest	Ladies' singles
Silver medal – second place	1982 Copenhagen	Ladies' singles
Silver medal – second place	1986 Geneva	Ladies' singles
European Championships
Gold medal – first place	1983 Dortmund	Ladies' singles
Gold medal – first place	1984 Budapest	Ladies' singles
Gold medal – first place	1985 Gothenburg	Ladies' singles
Gold medal – first place	1986 Copenhagen	Ladies' singles
Gold medal – first place	1987 Sarajevo	Ladies' singles
Gold medal – first place	1988 Prague	Ladies' singles
Silver medal – second place	1982 Lyon	Ladies' singles

Katarina Witt (German pronunciation: [kataˈʁiːna vɪt], audio; born 3 December 1965) is a German former figure skater. A two-time Olympic champion, Witt is regarded as one of the greatest ladies' singles figure skaters of all time. Her Laureus profile states that "she is remembered most for her overall athleticism, her charismatic appeal and her glamorous image on the ice."

Witt won the first of her two Olympic gold medals for East Germany at the 1984 Sarajevo Olympics, before winning a second at the 1988 Calgary Olympics. She is one of only two skaters to defend a ladies' singles Olympic title, the other being Norwegian Sonja Henie. Witt is a four-time World Champion (1984, 1985, 1987, 1988) and two-time World silver medalist (1982, 1986). She won six consecutive European Championships (1983–1988), a feat equalled only by Henie among female skaters. Between 1984 and 1988, Witt won ten gold medals in eleven major international events, making her one of the most successful figure skaters ever.

Retiring from competitive skating after defending her Olympic title in 1988, Witt reappeared at the 1994 Winter Olympics where she represented a reunified Germany while skating a Robin Hood-themed program, a comeback performance which saw her receive the Goldene Kamera award. Since her subsequent retirement, Witt has worked in film and television.

== Early life ==
Witt was born in Staaken (at that time a district of Falkensee) in East Germany, just outside West Berlin, which is today part of Berlin. Her mother worked in a hospital as a physiotherapist and her father was a farmer. She went to school in Karl-Marx-Stadt (now reverted to its pre-war name Chemnitz). There, she attended the Kinder- und Jugendsportschule, a special school for athletically talented children.

== Competitive career ==
Witt represented the SC Karl-Marx-Stadt club for East Germany (GDR). Jutta Müller began coaching her in 1977. Witt trained six days a week, sometimes for seven hours a day with three hours spent on compulsory figures.

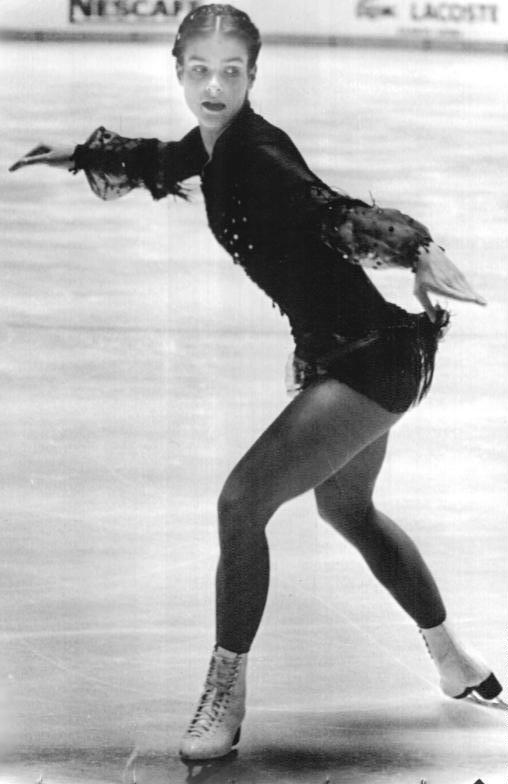
Witt in 1982

Witt made her first appearance in a major international competition at the 1979 European Championships, finishing 14th at the event. At the 1981 World Championships, she placed 1st in the short, 3rd in the long, and 2nd in the combined free skate, missing a medal due to low placement in figures.

She placed on a major podium for the first time in 1982, winning silver at both the European and World Championships. She had a great shot at winning the 1982 World Championships, which she only required winning the long program to do. However, she stepped out of three jumps, including the legendary triple flip, the complex element she was the very first woman to accomplish, and a relatively easy double axel, which cost her the long program win and the overall gold medal. The eventual winner of the competition was Elaine Zayak, who landed six triples.

The next season, she won her first European title but finished off the World podium in fourth place, because she was 8th in compulsory figures despite winning the combined free skating. Had she placed 1st in the long program instead of 2nd (on a 5–4 split) to Sumners, she would have jumped to the silver over both Leistner and Vodorezova. Her free skate with a triple flip and five triples was technically superior to Sumners', and many believed she should have taken the crucial 1st place in this phase.

In 1984, Witt was voted "GDR Female Athlete of the Year" by the readers of the East German newspaper Junge Welt. She won the 1984 Olympic title in Sarajevo, with reigning World champion Rosalynn Sumners of the United States in second. Witt and Sumners held the top two spots heading into the Olympic free skate, which was worth fifty percent of the total score. Witt landed three triple jumps in her free skate program, and the judges left room for Sumners to win the event. Sumners scaled back two of her jumps and Witt won the long program by one-tenth of a point on one judge's scorecard. Witt won the gold medal aged 18 years and 77 days, becoming one of the youngest Olympic figure skating champions. Witt then went on to win her first World title in dominant fashion (without Sumners) winning all three phases of the competition. She said then she planned to continue a while longer but did not see herself likely making it to the 1988 Calgary Olympics.

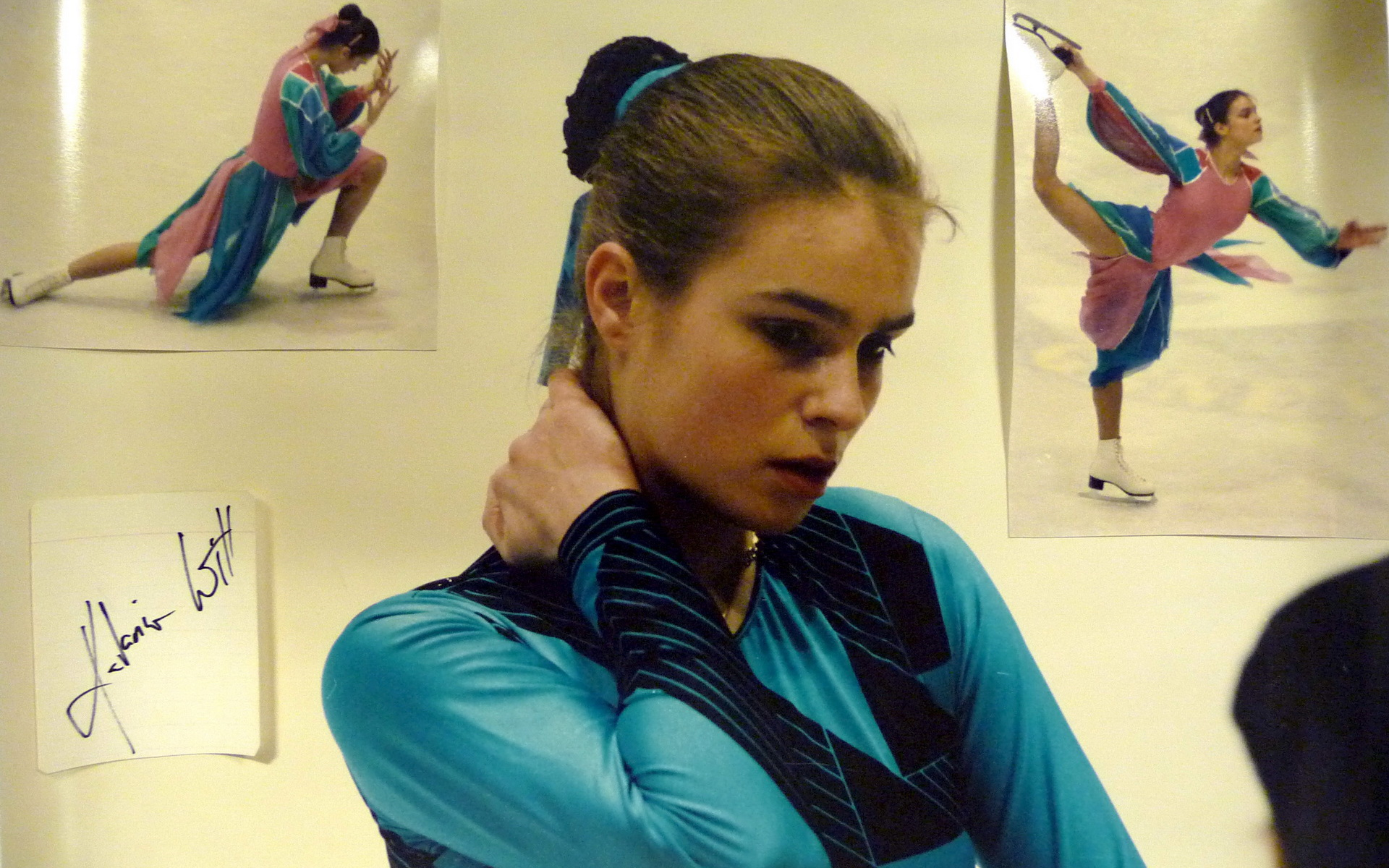
Witt at the 1986 World Championships

Witt successfully defended her World title in 1985. Here, she was solid and clean in all three phases, placing 3rd to her two main competitors, Kira Ivanova and Tiffany Chin, in the compulsory figures, convincingly winning the short program even over the clean skates of Ivanova and Chin. In the long program, she was put under pressure by Ivanova who made a strong bid for the gold with a clean three-triple long program including a difficult triple loop, but Witt trumped her with a four-triple long program, highlighting her superior artistry to Ivanova's and overtaking her by six judges to three in the long program as well as overall. The judges left room for Chin to win the long program and event, but unfortunately she fell on a double axel and did not complete a triple salchow in her performance, settling for the bronze medal.

Witt's longstanding gold-medal dominance of the sport was finally disrupted when in an upset she placed second to American Debi Thomas, the new United States Champion, the following year. At those Worlds, she did win the long program over Thomas's clean skate with identical content, scoring two 6.0s for artistic impression, but a combination miss which left her 4th in the short cost her the gold. This was also the first time since 1980 she would lose the short program phase at a World Championship. To win, she would have needed the final skater, Chin, to place between her and Thomas in the long program, but this did not occur. She had been considering making the 1986 World Championships her final event, but stung by the loss, Witt vowed to regain her title and skate on to Calgary.

In 1987, Witt won her third World title. Although Witt finished fifth in compulsory figures, which meant that Thomas could finish second in both the short and long programs and still retain the World title, Thomas' 7th place in the short program (due to a small hand down on her double axel) put the two skaters on a level playing field ahead of the free skate. In fact, five skaters entered the long program in strong contention for the gold: Kira Ivanova, Witt, Thomas, Elizabeth Manley, and Caryn Kadavy, all needing to only win the long program (or win the long program and beat Ivanova by two places in the long program in the case of Manley and Kadavy) to win. Skating last and under immense pressure with both Kadavy and Thomas having earlier turned in brilliant performances, Witt landed five triple jumps, including a clean triple loop jump which was most crucial of all to win. Earlier, Thomas had two footed her triple-loop attempt, and while Kadavy had done two successful triple loops, she had also popped several triple or double-axel attempts. Even on a night of brilliant skating by a majority of the notable competitors, Witt convincingly earned both the best technical and artistic marks of the night, was ranked first by seven of the nine judges, and reclaimed her World title to an appreciative crowd.

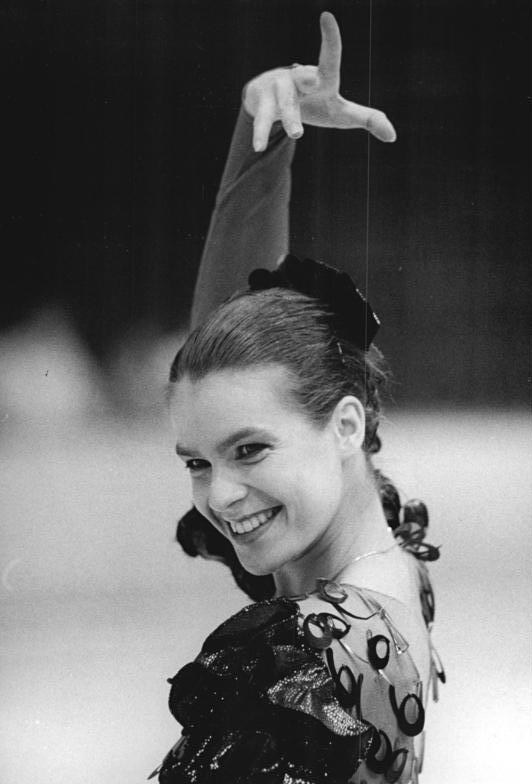
Witt in January 1988

In 1988, Witt won her sixth consecutive European Championship, equaling the achievement of Sonja Henie as the most-successful skater in ladies' singles at the European Championships. Both Witt's and Henie's number of European titles have since been surpassed by Irina Slutskaya, but Witt retains the record for most consecutive European titles, sharing it with Henie.

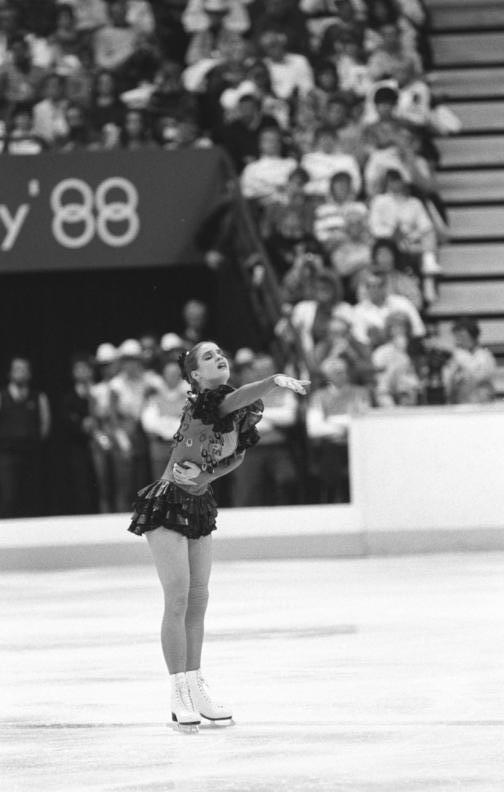
Witt at the 1988 Calgary Olympics, successfully defending her Olympic title

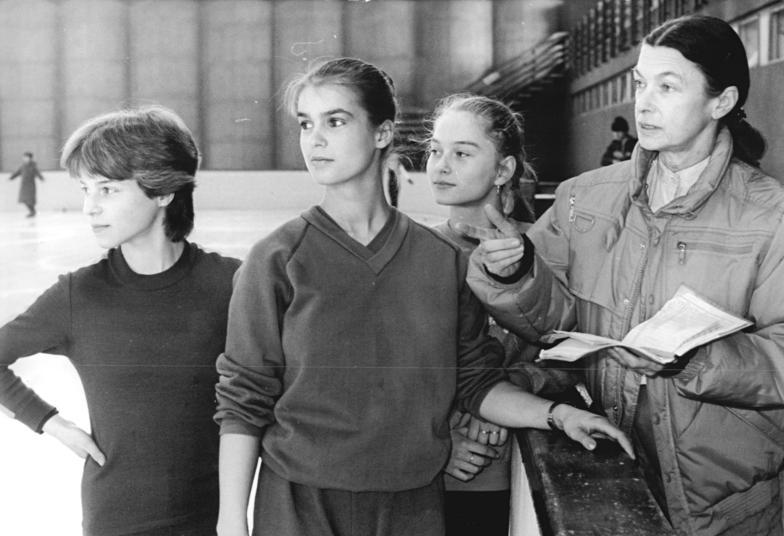
Witt with her trainer Jutta Müller at SC Karl-Marx-Stadt in Karl-Marx-Stadt in 1984

Both Witt and Thomas were favoured contenders at the 1988 Winter Olympics in Calgary, Alberta, Canada. Their rivalry was known as the "Battle of the Carmens", as each woman had independently elected to skate her long program to music from Bizet's opera Carmen. They held the top two spots after the compulsory figures and the short program. Witt was third in the compulsories, behind Ivanova and Thomas, before winning the short program with Thomas second. In her long program, Witt landed four triple jumps and downgraded her planned triple-loop jump to a double loop. This left room for Thomas to win the long program, but Thomas missed three of her five planned triple jumps. Canadian skater Elizabeth Manley won the long program convincingly over Witt (seven judges to two), however Witt retained her Olympic title based on her overall scores (she had finished ahead of Manley in both the compulsory figures and the short program).

Witt became only the second woman in figure skating history (after Sonja Henie) to defend her Olympic title successfully. Had Manley not narrowly lost second place to Thomas in the short program (by one judge), or Witt not narrowly held onto second place over Ito in the long program (on a 6–3 split), Manley would have defeated Witt for the overall gold medal. To honour Witt and her win in Calgary, North Korea issued miniature sheets with three large pictures of Witt on the ice. Time magazine called her "the most beautiful face of socialism."

Witt won a fourth and final World title to end her amateur career at the 1988 World Championships in Budapest, Hungary. She turned in a relatively lackluster long program, popping out of both a planned triple loop and triple salchow, and below the quality of her Olympic performance, but with other top contenders also being mostly subpar and fatigued after the high of the Calgary Games, she won gold with a victory in compulsory figures (just second win in figures in a World or Olympic event, only other instance was 1984 Worlds), 2nd place to Debi Thomas in the short program, and victory in the long program. One of her rivals, silver medalist Elizabeth Manley, later complained about some of what she perceived to be dubious foul play in the event, including Witt's win in the figures where she overcame Manley's lead in the first two figures in the final loop figure, which Manley believed to be her best, and Manley's music not being played properly to start her short program (where Manley had a combination miss and took only 4th place, ending her gold medal chances). On 1 November 1988, in honor of her victory at the Olympics, a block of stamps was released in the DPRK.

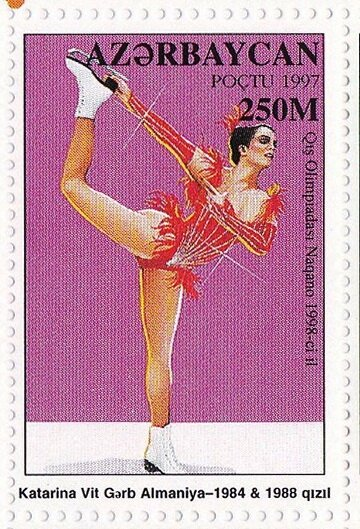
Witt on a 1998 Azerbaijani postage stamp

In 1988, Witt started a professional career – rare for East German athletes. She spent three years on tour in the United States with Brian Boitano, also an Olympic champion. Their show, "Witt and Boitano Skating", was so successful that for the first time in ten years, New York's Madison Square Garden was sold out for an ice show. Later, she continued at Holiday on Ice in the United States and in western Europe. She also became an actress in the film Carmen on Ice (1989), which expanded upon her gold-medal free program in Calgary. In 1990, she received an Emmy Award for her role in this film. As a professional she was never as successful competitively as an amateur, often placing last of four or five women in her appearances at the two biggest professional championships (Challenge of Champions and World Professional Championships in Landover), but she continued to receive great acclaim as an entertainer and show skater.

In 1994, Witt made a comeback to the competitive skating scene, coached again by Jutta Müller. She was expected to be in a fierce three-person fight for only two spots on the German Olympic team with both young rising star Tanja Szewczenko and veteran Marina Kielmann, who was almost the same age as Witt. She finished second at the German Championships behind Szewczenko, but above Kielmann.

Witt's first international competition for the reunified country of Germany, following eleven years competing for East Germany, was the 1994 European Championships. She finished eighth, again behind Szewczenko who finished in fifth, but again ahead of Kielmann who was ninth. She and Szewczenko thus gained the two available spots ahead of Kielmann for the 1994 Winter Olympics in Lillehammer, Norway, where she finished seventh. Witt performed a solid short program, where some of the contenders with more a difficult jump combination (Lu Chen, Josée Chouinard, Yuka Sato, Tonya Harding) faltered. This left her 6th, and included in the long program. She had not been expected to make it that far. In the buildup, she would also draw last to skate, and get to close the show in her final Olympic skate, after the medalists had already been determined. Her free program to the music "Sag mir wo die Blumen sind" (an arrangement of the Pete Seeger folksong "Where Have All the Flowers Gone?") was said to be a peace message from her to the people of Sarajevo, the site of her first Olympic victory. While she had some technical problems, completing only three of her planned five triples, she delivered emotional and moving performances. She received the Golden Camera for her Olympic comeback.

Witt's taste in figure-skating costumes sometimes caused debate. At the 1983 European Championships, she skated her Mozart short program in knee breeches instead of a skirt. Her blue, skirtless feather-trimmed 1988 costume for a showgirl-themed short program was considered too theatrical and sexy, and led to a change in the ISU regulations dubbed the "Katarina rule" which required female skaters to wear more modest clothing; skirts were required to cover the buttocks and crotch. In 1994, skating a Robin Hood-themed program, Witt stated, "I wore the Robin Hood – like a man's costume – because I didn't want to be accused of seducing the judges this time."

In 1994, Witt published her autobiography Meine Jahre zwischen Pflicht und Kür (My Years between Compulsories and Freestyle). In 1995, Witt was inducted into the World Figure Skating Hall of Fame. Her farewell from show skating tour took place in February and March 2008.

== Post-skating career ==
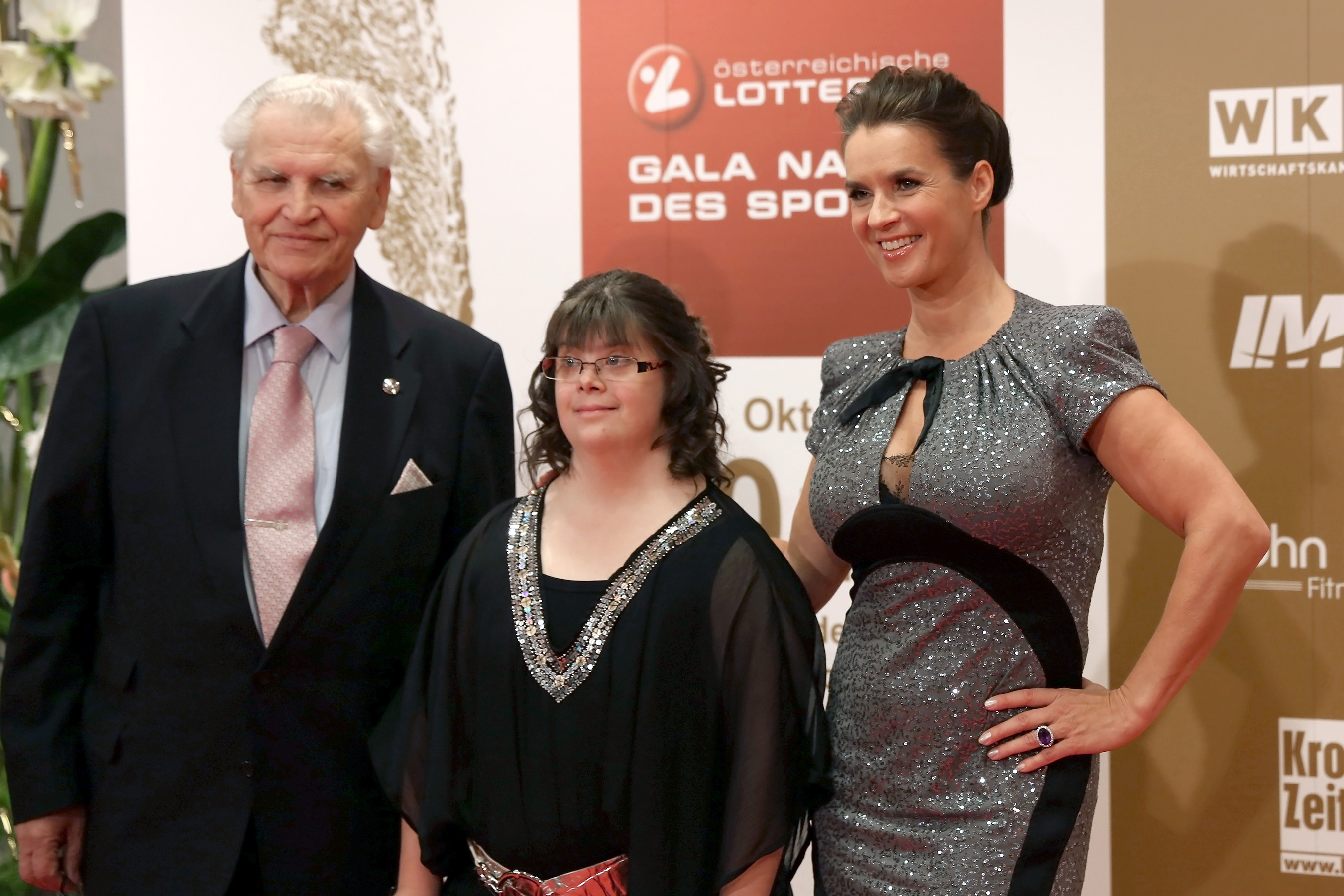
Katarina Witt (right) with Special Olympics athlete Teresa Breuer, Sportsman of the Year, Austria 2013

In 1996, Witt received the Golden Plate Award of the American Academy of Achievement.

In 1996, Witt had a cameo appearance in the movie Jerry Maguire, and on the television show Everybody Loves Raymond.

She starred in a German-language film called Die Eisprinzessin - The Ice Princess, providing the vocals for the theme song, "Skate with Me".

She appeared as herself in two episodes of the comedy series Arli$$ that aired in 1997 and 1998.

Witt posed nude for Playboy magazine, and the pictures were published months later in the December 1998 issue, which was the second ever sold-out issue of the magazine. (The first sold-out issue was the inaugural one including photos of Marilyn Monroe.) Witt said she did not care for the "cute, pretty, ice princess image" of figure skaters and wanted to "change people's perceptions".

In 1998, Witt appeared in the film Ronin in a small supporting role with several lines of dialogue. Around this time, she also played a villain in an episode of the tongue-in-cheek television series, V.I.P. In November 2005, Witt published a novel, Only with Passion, in which she offers advice to a fictional young skater based on her many years of skating. Since October 2006, she has had her own TV show, Stars auf Eis ("Stars on Ice"), on German channel ProSieben. She was invited to Istanbul as an honoured guest for the skating competition TV show called Buzda Dans ("Dance on Ice") on 25 February 2007. On 3 December 2011, Witt was confirmed as a judge on the UK TV show Dancing on Ice, where she made her first appearance on 8 January 2012.

On 7 July 2007, Witt was a competitor at the German segment of Live Earth. She headed Munich's unsuccessful bid to host the 2018 Winter Olympics.

In January 2013, Witt appeared on German TV in her first leading role, playing a figure skater who is pursued by a stalker. The made-for-television movie The Stalker thus has autobiographical elements, as Witt herself had been stalked in the United States 20 years earlier.

=== East German files ===
Following the dissolution of East Germany, Ministerium für Staatssicherheit (Stasi) files were found to show that the secret police had worked hard to keep Witt from defecting by giving her cars and accommodation, and permitted foreign travel. Witt found 3,500 pages detailing her life from the age of seven.

== Programs ==
Season	Short program	Free skating	Exhibition
1993–1994	Robin Hood: Prince of Thieves by Michael Kamen	Where Have All the Flowers Gone? by Pete Seeger	
1987–1988	Jerry's Girls by Jerry Herman	Carmen Suite by Rodion Shchedrin	Put the Blame on Mame by Rita Hayworth; Love Story; Big Spender by Shirley Bassey; Bad by Michael Jackson; I Am What I Am from "La Cage Aux Folles" by Shirley Bassey
1986–1987	In the Mood by Glenn Miller	West Side Story by Leonard Bernstein	
1985–1986	Theme from "Caravans" by Mike Batt	West Side Story by Leonard Bernstein	Make Believe It's Your First Time by The Carpenters
1984–1985	Flamenco Fantasy	I Got Rhythm; Embraceable You; Mona Lisa by George Gershwin	
1983–1984	Csárdás by Vittorio Monti	I Got Rhythm; Embraceable You; Mona Lisa by George Gershwin	Love Me Tender by Elvis Presley; Die Juliska aus Budapest from Maske in Blau by Fred Raymond
1982–1983	Rondò Veneziano Medley; Mozart Medley	Rhapsody in Black	
1981–1982		Superman by John Williams	
1980–1981	The Muppet Show		

== Results ==
Competition placements at senior level
Event	1978–79	1979–80	1980–81	1981–82	1982–83	1983–84	1984–85	1985–86	1986–87	1987–88	1993–94
Olympics						1st				1st	7th
Worlds		10th	5th	2nd	4th	1st	1st	2nd	1st	1st	
Europeans	14th	13th	5th	2nd	1st	1st	1st	1st	1st	1st	8th
Skate Canada						1st					
NHK Trophy			2nd		1st				1st	1st	
Blue Swords	1st	2nd		1st							
International Challenge Cup			2nd	1st		1st					
Golden Spin of Zagreb	3rd										
East German	3rd	2nd	1st	1st	1st	1st	1st	1st	1st	1st	
German											2nd

== See also ==
- Sport in Berlin

Awards and achievements
Preceded by (East Germany) Marita Koch	East German Sportswoman of the Year; 1984	Succeeded by (East Germany) Marita Koch
