= San Marino at the 1992 Winter Olympics =

- IOC code: SMR
- NOC: Sammarinese National Olympic Committee
- Website: www.cons.sm (in Italian)

in Albertville
- Competitors: 3 (men) in 2 sports
- Flag bearer: Andrea Sammaritani (Cross-country skiing)
- Medals: Gold 0 Silver 0 Bronze 0 Total 0

Winter Olympics appearances (overview)
- 1976; 1980; 1984; 1988; 1992; 1994; 1998; 2002; 2006; 2010; 2014; 2018; 2022; 2026

San Marino participated at the 1992 Winter Olympics in Albertville, France, held between 8 and 23 February 1992. The country's participation in the Games marked its fourth appearance at the Winter Olympics since its debut in the 1976 Games.

The San Marino team consisted of three athletes who competed across two events. Skier Andrea Sammaritani served as the country's flag-bearer during the opening ceremony. San Marino had not won a Winter Olympics medal as of the Games, and did not win any medal in the current Games.

== Background ==
The National Olympic Committee of San Marino was formed on 16 April 1959. The Comitato Olimpico Nazionale Sammarinese was recognized by the International Olympic Committee (IOC) on 25 May of the same year. San Marino first participated in Olympic competition at the 1960 Summer Olympics, and have participated in most Olympic Games ever since. The 1976 Winter Olympics marked San Marino's first participation in the Winter Olympics. After the nation made its debut in the 1976 Games, this edition of the Games in 1992 marked the nation's fourth appearance at the Winter Games.

The 1992 Winter Olympics was held in Albertville, France, held between 8 and 23 February 1992. The San Marino team consisted of three athletes who competed across two events. Skier Andrea Sammaritani served as the country's flag-bearer during the opening ceremony. San Marino had not won a Winter Olympics medal as of the Games, and did not win any medal in the current Games.

== Competitors ==
San Marino sent five athletes who competed in two sports at the Games.

Sport	Men	Women	Total
Alpine skiing	2	0	2
Cross-country skiing	1	0	1
Total	3	0	3

== Alpine skiing ==
Alpine skiing competitions for men were held at Val d’Isère and Les Menuires. The San Marino team consisted of two athletes– Nicola Ercolani, and Jason Gasperoni, who competed in three men's events. Ercolani made his debut in the previous Games and would go on to represent the nation in the next Winter Games in 1994. This was the first and only Winter Games appearance for Gasperoni.

In the men's super-G event at the Games, Ercolani recorded the best finish after crossing the 1,650 m (5,410 ft) course in just over one minute and 23 seconds to finish 66th amongst the 118 participants, while Gasperoni did not finish the course. In the giant slalom event, while Ercolani did not finish his run, Gasperoni clocked 1:20.74 in the first run and did better with a time of 1:17.61 in the second run. Gasperoni finished in 59th place amongst the 118 participants with a combined time of over two minutes and 38 seconds. In the slalom event, both of them failed to finish the course.

Athlete	Event	Race 1	Race 2	Total	
Athlete	Event	Time	Time	Time	Rank
Jason Gasperoni	Men's super-G	—N/a		DNF	–
Nicola Ercolani	Men's super-G	—N/a		1:23.72	66
Jason Gasperoni	Men's Giant slalom	1:20.74	1:17.61	2:38.35	59
Nicola Ercolani	Men's Giant slalom	DNF	–	DNF	–
Jason Gasperoni	Men's slalom	DNF	–	DNF	–
Nicola Ercolani	Men's slalom	DNF	DNF	DNF	DNF

== Cross-country skiing ==
Cross-country skiing competitions were held between 9 and 22 February at Les Saisies in a specially constructed Nordic center. The San Marino team consisted of a lone athlete, flag-bearter Andrea Sammaritani, who competed in two men's events. This was the third and final Winter Games appearance for Sammaritani after his participation in the previous two Games. In the men's 10 km classical event at the Games, Sammaritani finished 109th and second last after crossing the course in just over 47 minutes and 37 seconds. In the men's 15 km pursuit event, he fared slightly better and finished 97th amongst the 102 participants.

Athlete	Event	Race	
Athlete	Event	Time	Rank
Andrea Sammaritani	Men's 10 km classical	47:37.8	109
Andrea Sammaritani	Men's 15 km pursuit	1'22:39.4	97
