= San Marino at the 1988 Winter Olympics =

- IOC code: SMR
- NOC: Sammarinese National Olympic Committee
- Website: www.cons.sm (in Italian)

in Calgary
- Competitors: 5 (men) in 2 sports
- Flag bearer: Nicola Ercolani (Alpine skiing)
- Medals: Gold 0 Silver 0 Bronze 0 Total 0

Winter Olympics appearances (overview)
- 1976; 1980; 1984; 1988; 1992; 1994; 1998; 2002; 2006; 2010; 2014; 2018; 2022; 2026

San Marino participated at the 1988 Winter Olympics in Calgary, Alberta, Canada, held between 13 and 28 February 1988. The country's participation in the Games marked its third appearance at the Winter Olympics since its debut in the 1976 Games.

The San Marino team consisted of five athletes who competed across two events. Skier Nicola Ercolani served as the country's flag-bearer during the opening ceremony. San Marino had not won a Winter Olympics medal as of the Games, and did not win any medal in the current Games.

== Background ==
The National Olympic Committee of San Marino was formed on 16 April 1959. The Comitato Olimpico Nazionale Sammarinese was recognized by the International Olympic Committee (IOC) on 25 May of the same year. San Marino first participated in Olympic competition at the 1960 Summer Olympics, and have participated in most Olympic Games ever since. The 1976 Winter Olympics marked San Marino's first participation in the Winter Olympics. After the nation made its debut in the 1976 Games, this edition of the Games in 1988 marked the nation's third appearance at the Winter Games.

The 1988 Winter Olympics was held in Calgary, Canada, between 13 and 28 February 1988. The San Marino team consisted of five athletes who competed across two events. Skier Nicola Ercolani served as the country's flag-bearer during the opening ceremony. San Marino had not won a Winter Olympics medal as of the Games, and did not win any medal in the current Games.

== Competitors ==
San Marino sent five athletes who competed in two sports at the Games.

Sport	Men	Women	Total
Alpine skiing	4	0	4
Cross-country skiing	1	0	1
Total	5	0	5

== Alpine skiing ==
Alpine skiing competitions were held at Nakiska in Alberta. The San Marino team consisted of four athletes– Fabio Guardigli, Francesco Cardelli, flag bearer Nicola Ercolani, and Riccardo Stacchini, who competed in three men's events. This was the second Winter Games appearance for Cardelli after his debut in the previous Games. Ercolani made his debut in the Games and would go on to represent the nation in two further Winter Games. This was the first and only Winter Games appearance for Guardigli and Stacchini.

In the men's super-G event at the Games, Ercolani recorded the best finish after crossing the 2,327 m (7,635 ft) course in just under two minutes to finish 45th amongst the 57 finishers. In the giant slalom event, Ercolani clocked 1:27.42 in the first run and did better with a time of 1:17.14 in the second run. He finished in 56th with a combined time of over two minutes and 38 seconds. Guardigli and Cardelli finished 60th and 63rd in the same event. In the slalom event, Cardelli and Ercolani registered 44th and 45th place finishes while Guardigli failed to finish the course.

Athlete	Event	Race 1	Race 2	Total	
Athlete	Event	Time	Time	Time	Rank
Fabio Guardigli	Men's super-G	—		2:06.59	51
Nicola Ercolani	Men's super-G	—		1:59.70	45
Riccardo Stacchini	Men's super-G	—		DSQ	–
Fabio Guardigli	Men's giant slalom	1:24.40	1:22.15	2:46.55	60
Francesco Cardelli	Men's giant slalom	1:27.15	1:24.28	2:51.43	63
Nicola Ercolani	Men's giant slalom	1:21.42	1:17.14	2:38.56	56
Riccardo Stacchini	Men's giant slalom	1:21.89	DNF	DNF	–
Fabio Guardigli	Men's slalom	DNF	–	DNF	–
Francesco Cardelli	Men's slalom	1:20.40	1:14.81	2:35.21	44
Nicola Ercolani	Men's slalom	1:32.97	1:05.85	2:38.82	45

== Cross-country skiing ==
Cross-country skiing competitions were held at Canmore Nordic Centre. The San Marino team consisted of a lone athlete Andrea Sammaritani, who competed in two men's events. This was the second Winter Games appearance for Sammaritani after his debut in the previous Games. In the men's 15 km classical event at the Games, Sammaritani finished 82nd after crossing the course in just over one hour and two minutes to finish last amongst the classified finishers. In the men's 30 km classical event, he fared slightly better and finished second last amongst the 87 classified finishers.

Athlete	Event	Race	
Athlete	Event	Time	Rank
Andrea Sammaritani	Men's 15 km classical	1'02:58.1	85
Andrea Sammaritani	Men's 30 km classical	2'15:07.7	86

C = Classical style, F = Freestyle
