= Nicola Ercolani =

Sammarinese alpine skier (born 1969)

Personal information
- Nationality: Sammarinese
- Born: 10 November 1969 (age 55)
- Height: 192 cm (76 in)
- Weight: 96 kg (212 lb)

Sport
- Sport: Alpine skiing

Nicola Ercolani (born 10 November 1969) is a Sammarinese alpine skier. He represented San Marino at the 1988, 1992 and the 1994 Winter Olympics. He also served as the flag-bearer for San Marino during the 1988 Winter Olympics opening ceremony.

== Career ==
Ercolani started competing in international events in alpine skiing in 1988. He was named to the Sammarinese team for the 1988 Winter Olympics held at Calgary. This was his debut at the Winter Olympics. He served as the country's flag-bearer during the opening ceremony. In the men's super-G event at the Games, Ercolani recorded the best finish amongst the Sammarinese after crossing the 2,327 m (7,635 ft) course in just under two minutes to finish 45th amongst the 57 finishers. In the giant slalom event, Ercolani clocked 1:27.42 in the first run and did better with a time of 1:17.14 in the second run. He finished in 56th with a combined time of over two minutes and 38 seconds. In the slalom event, Ercolani registered a 45th place finish.

In 1992, Ercolani was named to the Sammarinese team for the second consecutive Winter Olympics. He participated in three events in the competition. In the men's super-G event at the Games, Ercolani crossed the 1,650 m (5,410 ft) course in just over one minute and 23 seconds to finish 66th amongst the 118 participants. In the giant slalom event, Ercolani did not finish his run. In the slalom event, he again failed to finish the course. In 1994, Ercolani was named to the Sammarinese team for the 1994 Winter Olympics. This was his third and last participation in the Winter Games. He participated in a single event at the Games. Ercolani did not finish his run in the giant slalom event.

After the 1994 Winter Games, Ercolani continued to represent San Marino in international competitions till 1995. His best finish came in the FIS championships held in St.Moritz in April 1995.
