= San Marino at the 1994 Winter Olympics =

- IOC code: SMR
- NOC: Sammarinese National Olympic Committee
- Website: www.cons.sm (in Italian)

in Lillehammer
- Competitors: 3 (men) in 2 sports
- Flag bearer: Dino Crescentini (bobsleigh)
- Medals: Gold 0 Silver 0 Bronze 0 Total 0

Winter Olympics appearances (overview)
- 1976; 1980; 1984; 1988; 1992; 1994; 1998; 2002; 2006; 2010; 2014; 2018; 2022; 2026

San Marino was represented at the 1994 Winter Olympics in Lillehammer, Norway by the Comitato Olimpico Nazionale Sammarinese.

In total, three athletes represented San Marino in two different sports including alpine skiing and bobsleigh.

The debut of the San Marino national bobsleigh team dates back to this edition. The two-man bobsleigh used by Dino Crescentini and Mike Crocenzi (Jean Pierre Renzi was reserve) is now on display at the Sports and Olympics Museum, inside the San Marino Stadium in Serravalle, San Marino.

== Competitors ==
In total, three athletes represented San Marino at the 1994 Winter Olympics in Lillehammer, Norway across two different sports.

Sport	Men	Women	Total
Alpine skiing	1	0	1
Bobsleigh	2	–	2
Total	3	0	3

== Alpine skiing ==
One Sammarinese athlete participated in the alpine skiing events – Nicola Ercolani in the men's giant slalom.

The men's giant slalom took place on 23 February 1994. Ercolani did not finish his first run and did not take part in run two.

Men

Athlete	Event	Race 1	Race 2	Total	
Athlete	Event	Time	Time	Time	Rank
Nicola Ercolani	Giant Slalom	DNF	–	DNF	–

== Bobsleigh ==
Two Sammarinese athletes participated in the bobsleigh events – Dino Crescentini and Mike Crocenzi in the two-man bob.

The appearance of a bobsleigh team representing San Marino attracted media attention as the athletes – dubbed "no-hopers" by The Independent – were from Rochester Hills, Michigan, United States and held dual Sammarinese citizenship but only recently taken up bobsleigh.

The two-man bobsleigh took place on 19 and 20 February 1994. The first two runs took place on 19 February and the last two runs on 20 February. In their first run, Crescentini and Crocenzi completed the course in 55.36 seconds. Their second run was their fastest of the four at 55.11 seconds. They completed run three in 55.35 seconds and their final run was 55.43 seconds. Their total time of 3 minutes 41.25 seconds saw them finish in 41st place from 43 sleds.

Sled	Athletes	Event	Run 1		Run 2		Run 3		Run 4		Total	
Sled	Athletes	Event	Time	Rank	Time	Rank	Time	Rank	Time	Rank	Time	Rank
SMR-1	Dino Crescentini; Mike Crocenzi	Two-man	55.36	41	55.11	39	55.35	41	55.43	41	3:41.25	41

== Sources ==
- Official Olympic Reports
- Olympic Winter Games 1994, full results by sports-reference.com
