= Andrea Sammaritani =

Sammarinese cross-country skier (born 1957)

Personal information
- Nationality: Sammarinese
- Born: 30 November 1957 (age 67); Rimini, Italy

Sport
- Sport: Cross-country skiing

Andrea Sammaritani (born 30 November 1957) is a Sammarinese cross-country skier. He competed at the 1984 Winter Olympics, the 1988 Winter Olympics and the 1992 Winter Olympics. He also served as the flag-bearer for San Marino during the 1992 Winter Olympics opening ceremony.

== Early years ==
Andrea Sammaritani was born 30 November 1957 at Rimini in Italy.

== Career ==
Sammaritani was named to the Sammarinese team for the 1984 Winter Olympics held at Sarajevo. This was his debut at the Winter Olympics. In the men's 15 km classical event at the Games, he finished 82nd after crossing the course in just over one hour and three minutes to finish second last amongst the classified finishers. Sammaritani was classified 69th and last amongst the 72 participants excluding non-finishers in the men's 30 km classical event.

Sammaritani was part of the San Marino team for the 1988 Winter Olympics held at Calgary. This was his second consecutive Winter Olympics. He served as the flag bearer for San Marino in the 1992 Winter Olympics opening ceremony. In the men's 15 km classical event at the Games, Sammaritani finished 82nd after crossing the course in just over one hour and two minutes to finish last amongst the classified finishers. In the men's 30 km classical event, he fared slightly better and finished second last amongst the 87 classified finishers.

In 1992, Sammaritani was named to the Sammarinese team for the third consecutive Winter Olympics. He participated in two events in the competition. This was his third and final Winter Games appearance. In the men's 10 km classical event at the Games, Sammaritani finished 109th and second last after crossing the course in just over 47 minutes and 37 seconds. In the men's 15 km pursuit event, he fared slightly better and finished 97th amongst the 102 participants.
