= San Marino at the 1984 Winter Olympics =

- IOC code: SMR
- NOC: Sammarinese National Olympic Committee
- Website: www.cons.sm (in Italian)

in Sarajevo
- Competitors: 3 (men) in 2 sports
- Flag bearer: Marino Guardigli
- Medals: Gold 0 Silver 0 Bronze 0 Total 0

Winter Olympics appearances (overview)
- 1976; 1980; 1984; 1988; 1992; 1994; 1998; 2002; 2006; 2010; 2014; 2018; 2022; 2026

San Marino participated at the 1984 Winter Olympics in Sarajevo, Bosnia, Yugoslavia, held between 8 and 19 February 1984. The country's participation in the Games marked its second appearance at the Winter Olympics since its debut in the 1976 Games.

The San Marino team consisted of three athletes who competed across two events. Marino Guardigli served as the country's flag-bearer during the opening ceremony. San Marino had not won a Winter Olympics medal as of the Games, and did not win any medal in the current Games.

== Background ==
The National Olympic Committee of San Marino was formed on 16 April 1959. The Comitato Olimpico Nazionale Sammarinese was recognized by the International Olympic Committee (IOC) on 25 May of the same year. San Marino first participated in Olympic competition at the 1960 Summer Olympics, and have participated in most Olympic Games ever since. The 1976 Winter Olympics marked San Marino's first participation in the Winter Olympics. After the nation made its debut in the 1976 Games, this edition of the Games in 1984 marked the nation's second appearance at the Winter Games.

San Marino participated at the 1984 Winter Olympics in Sarajevo, Bosnia, Yugoslavia, held between 8 and 19 February 1984. The country's participation in the Games marked its second appearance at the Winter Olympics since its debut in the 1976 Games.

The 1984 Winter Olympics was held in Sarajevo, Bosnia, Yugoslavia, held between 8 and 19 February 1984. The San Marino team consisted of three athletes who competed across two events. Marino Guardigli served as the country's flag-bearer during the opening ceremony. San Marino had not won a Winter Olympics medal as of the Games, and did not win any medal in the current Games.

== Competitors ==
San Marino sent three athletes who competed in two sports at the Games.

Sport	Men	Women	Total
Alpine skiing	2	0	2
Cross-country skiing	1	0	1
Total	3	0	3

== Alpine skiing ==
Alpine skiing competitions were held from 11 to 19 February at Bjelašnica and Jahorina mountains. The San Marino team consisted of two athletes– Christian Bollini, and Francesco Cardelli, who competed in two men's events. Cardelli made his debut in the Games and would go on to represent the nation in the next Winter Games in 1988. Bollini made his first and only Winter Games appearance in 1984.

In the giant slalom event, Cardelli clocked 1:49.00 in the first run to be ranked 69th amongst the 108 participants. However, he did not finish the second run. Bollini failed to complete his first run, and was not classified. In the slalom event, Cardelli and Bolini registered 40th and 43rd place finishes respectively amongst the 101 participants after posting better times on the second run compared to the first run.

Athlete	Event	Race 1		Race 2		Total	
Athlete	Event	Time	Rank	Time	Rank	Time	Rank
Christian Bollini	Men's Giant slalom	DNF	–	–	–	DNF	–
Francesco Cardelli	Men's Giant slalom	1:49.00	69	DNF	–	DNF	–
Christian Bollini	Men's Slalom	1:23.50	62	1:16.54	41	2:40.04	43
Francesco Cardelli	Men's Slalom	1:17.67	59	1:16.06	40	2:33.73	40

== Cross-country skiing ==
Cross-country skiing competitions were held between 9 and 19 February at Veliko Polje, Igman. The San Marino team consisted of a lone athlete Andrea Sammaritani, who competed in two men's events. This was the Winter Games debut appearance for Sammaritani, who also competed in the next Winter Olympics in 1988. In the men's 15 km classical event at the Games, Sammaritani finished 82nd after crossing the course in just over one hour and three minutes to finish second last amongst the classified finishers. The men's 30 km classical event was affected by bad weather. Sammaritani was classified 69th and last amongst the 72 participants excluding non-finishers.

Athlete	Event	Race	
Athlete	Event	Time	Rank
Andrea Sammaritani	Men's 15 km classical	1'03:05.3	82
Andrea Sammaritani	Men's 30 km classical	2'26:55.9	69
