= San Marino at the 2002 Winter Olympics =

- IOC code: SMR
- NOC: Sammarinese National Olympic Committee
- Website: www.cons.sm (in Italian)

in Salt Lake City
- Competitors: 1 (man) in 1 sport
- Flag bearer: Gian Matteo Giordani
- Medals: Gold 0 Silver 0 Bronze 0 Total 0

Winter Olympics appearances (overview)
- 1976; 1980; 1984; 1988; 1992; 1994; 1998; 2002; 2006; 2010; 2014; 2018; 2022; 2026

San Marino sent a delegation to compete at the 2002 Winter Olympics, in Salt Lake City, Utah, United States from 8–24 February 2002. This was the nation's sixth appearance at a Winter Olympic Games. The delegation consisted of a single athlete, alpine skier Gian Matteo Giordani. In his race, the giant slalom, he finished in last place of those who finished the course at 57th.

== Background ==
San Marino first entered Olympic competition at the 1960 Summer Olympics in Rome. The nation did not enter a Winter Olympic Games until Innsbruck in 1976. Excepting the 1980 and 1998 Winter Olympics, San Marino has participated in every edition of the Winter Olympics since, making Salt Lake City the nation's sixth Winter Olympics appearance. The Sammarinesi delegation consisted of a single alpine skier, Gian Matteo Giordani. He was also selected as the flag bearer for the opening ceremony. He was the only athlete competing for San Marino at the 2002 Games.

== Alpine skiing ==
Gian Matteo Giordani was 17 years old at the time of the Salt Lake City Olympics. Giordani placed at 73rd and 57th in the first and second runs, respectively. Giordani finished with a combined time of 2:48.31 and in 57th place overall, leaving him in last place among competitors that successfully completed the course.

Athlete	Event	Race 1	Race 2	Total	
Athlete	Event	Time	Time	Time	Rank
Gian Matteo Giordani	Giant Slalom	1:25.02	1:23.29	2:48.31	57
