= Stacchini =

Stacchini is an Italian surname. Notable people with the surname include:

- Gino Stacchini (born 1938), Italian footballer
- Riccardo Stacchini (born 1965), Sammarinese alpine skier
- Ulisse Stacchini (1871–1947), Italian architect
