= San Marino at the 1976 Winter Olympics =

- IOC code: SMR
- NOC: Sammarinese National Olympic Committee
- Website: www.cons.sm (in Italian)

in Innsbruck
- Competitors: 2 (men) in 1 sport
- Flag bearer: Marino Guardigli
- Medals: Gold 0 Silver 0 Bronze 0 Total 0

Winter Olympics appearances (overview)
- 1976; 1980; 1984; 1988; 1992; 1994; 1998; 2002; 2006; 2010; 2014; 2018; 2022; 2026

San Marino participated at the 1976 Winter Olympics held in Innsbruck, Austria from the 4 to 15 February 1976. The country's participation in the Games marked its debut at the Winter Olympics after having previously competing in three Summer Olympic Games.

The San Marino team consisted of two athletes– Giorgio Cecchetti and Maurizio Battistini, who competed in alpine skiing. Marino Guardigli served as the country's flag-bearer during the opening ceremony. San Marino did not win any medal in the Games.

== Background ==
The National Olympic Committee of San Marino was formed on 16 April 1959. The Comitato Olimpico Nazionale Sammarinese was recognized by the International Olympic Committee (IOC) on 25 May of the same year. San Marino first participated in Olympic competition at the 1960 Summer Olympics, and have participated in most Olympic Games ever since. The 1976 Winter Olympics marked San Marino's first participation in the Winter Olympics after having competed in three Summer Olympics. held in Innsbruck, Austria from the 4 to 15 February 1976. The country's participation in the Games marked its debut at the Winter Olympics after having previously competing in three Summer Olympic Games.

The 1976 Winter Olympics was held in Innsbruck, Austria from the 4 to 15 February 1976. The San Marino team consisted of two athletes who competed in a single sport. Marino Guardigli served as the country's flag-bearer during the opening ceremony. San Marino did not win a medal in the Games.

== Competitors ==
San Marino sent two athletes (all men) who competed in two events in alpine skiing.

Sport	Men	Women	Total
Alpine skiing	2	0	2
Total	2	0	2

== Alpine skiing ==
Alpine skiing competitions were held between 5 and 14 February 1976 at Axamer Lizum in Innsbruck. The San Marino team consisted of two athletes– Giorgio Cecchetti and Maurizio Battistini, who competed in two men's events. Being the nation's first appearance at the Winter Games, both the athletes made their Olympics debut at the Games. This was also the only Winter Games both of them took part in.

In the giant slalom event, Battistini and Cecchetti were classified 81st and 82nd amongst the 97 participants in the first run. Despite recording a worse time of 2:41.02 across the 1,525 m (5,003 ft) course in his second run, Cecchetti was classified in 51st place as many of the competitors including Battistini failed to complete the race. In the slalom event, Battistini was the only participant from the nation and he failed to finish the course.

Athlete	Event	Race 1		Race 2		Total	
Athlete	Event	Time	Rank	Time	Rank	Time	Rank
Giorgio Cecchetti	Men's Giant slalom	2:37.15	82	2:41.02	51	5:18.17	51
Maurizio Battistini	Men's Giant slalom	2:33.33	81	DNF	–	DNF	–
Maurizio Battistini	Men's Slalom	DNF	–	–	–	DNF	–
