= San Marino national bobsleigh team =

The San Marino bobsleigh team represents the Republic of San Marino in international bobsleedding competitions.

The team took part in one edition of the Winter Olympics, at Lillehammer 1994.

== History ==
The San Marino national bobsleigh team was founded by four construction entrepreneurs residing in Rochester Hills, Michigan with dual citizenship of San Marino and USA: Jean Pierre Renzi, Mike Crocenzi, and brothers Marcello and Dino Crescentini. Although they had neither the equipment nor a coach, they were determined to make their "Olympic dream" come true.

The four members of the San Marino team, three of whom were already over 40 years old at the time, started bobsleighing in 1991. In January 1994 they managed to qualify for the Olympic Games in Lillehammer, in an unusual way: during the trials in Lake Placid, they had to rent a bobsleigh after leaving theirs in Europe. After three days of slow runs, they discovered three loose bolts on one of the skates, and during one trial the San Marino team's bobsled suffered a serious accident, so much so that the track judges thought Dino Crescentini had died, as his helmet had been ripped off and was in the middle of the track. When the sled was repaired, they finished third in one race and fourth in another, thus earning enough points for a place in the Olympics.

The team of San Marino, composed of flag bearer Dino Crescentini and Mike Crocenzi, as well as Jean Pierre Renzi as reserve, ranked 41st place among the 43 teams participating in the two-man event at the XVII Winter Olympic Games, ahead of the second team of the US Virgin Islands, while the Jamaica national bobsleigh team failed to complete the competition.

The original San Marino's bobsleigh used in the 1994 Lillehammer Winter Games is now on display in the Museum of Sport and Olympism located inside the San Marino Stadium in Serravalle.

== Olympic record ==
=== Two-man ===
Olympics	City	Ranking	Bobsledders
1994	Lillehammer	41	Dino Crescentini, Mike Crocenzi

== See also ==
- San Marino at the Olympics
- San Marino at the 1994 Winter Olympics
