= Marino Cardelli =

Sammarinese alpine skier (born 1987)

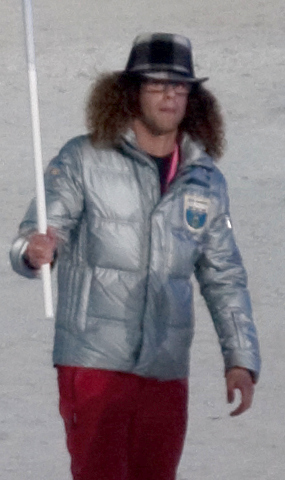
- Cardelli at the 2010 Olympics

Personal information
- Born: 5 October 1987 (age 39) Borgo Maggiore, San Marino
- Height: 180 cm (5 ft 11 in)
- Weight: 75 kg (165 lb)

Sport
- Sport: Alpine skiing

Marino Cardelli (born 5 October 1987) is an alpine skier from San Marino. He competed in the giant slalom event at the 2006 and 2010 Winter Olympics. He was the lone participant from the nation in these Games and hence served as the Olympic flag bearer for San Marino in both the Games.

== Early life ==
Marino Cardelli was born on 5 October 1987 in Borgo Maggiore in San Marino. His parent were both teachers. He went skiing with his parents and brother in Italy during his youth.

== Career ==
Cardelli participated in alpine skiing races conducted by the International Ski Federation starting in 2002. He competed in the World Junior Alpine Skiing Championships 2004 at Maribor, placing 101st in the giant slalom and was disqualified in the super-G event. The following year, he competed in the World Alpine Skiing Championships in the giant slalom event, where he placed 69th. In the World Junior Championships in 2005 held in Italy, he participated in three disciplines, with his best result being 74th in the giant slalom.

Cardelli was named to the Sammarinese team for the 2006 Winter Olympics held at Turin. This was his debut at the Winter Olympics. He was the only representative of San Marino at the Games. He served as the flag bearer for San Marino in the opening and closing ceremonies. Cardelli was 18 years old at the time of the Turin Olympics. As he was the lowest ranked competitor in the men's giant slalom event, he was last in the starting order on 20 February. He did not complete the first run of the race, and was not classified in the final rankings.

Cardelli was again part of the Sammarinese team for the 2010 Winter Olympics held at Vancouver. This was his second and last appearance at the Winter Olympics. He was again the only representative of San Marino at the Games. He served as the flag-bearer in the opening ceremony. His only event in Vancouver was the giant slalom event held on 23 February. He completed the first run time in one minute and 40 seconds, and was over 23 seconds behind the leader. Later that day, he clocked one minute and 44 seconds in his second run, 24 seconds behind the lap's fastest skier. With a combined time of three minutes and 25 seconds, he was placed in 80th position out of 81 competitors who finished both runs.
