= San Marino at the 2010 Winter Olympics =

- IOC code: SMR
- NOC: Sammarinese National Olympic Committee
- Website: www.cons.sm (in Italian)

in Vancouver
- Competitors: 1 (1 man) in 1 sport
- Flag bearer: Marino Cardelli
- Medals: Gold 0 Silver 0 Bronze 0 Total 0

Winter Olympics appearances (overview)
- 1976; 1980; 1984; 1988; 1992; 1994; 1998; 2002; 2006; 2010; 2014; 2018; 2022; 2026

San Marino sent a delegation to compete in the 2010 Winter Olympics in Vancouver, British Columbia, Canada from 12 to 28 February 2010. This was the nation's eighth appearance in the Winter Olympic Games since its debut in 1976. The San Marino delegation consisted of a single competitor, the alpine skier Marino Cardelli, who finished 80th in his only event.

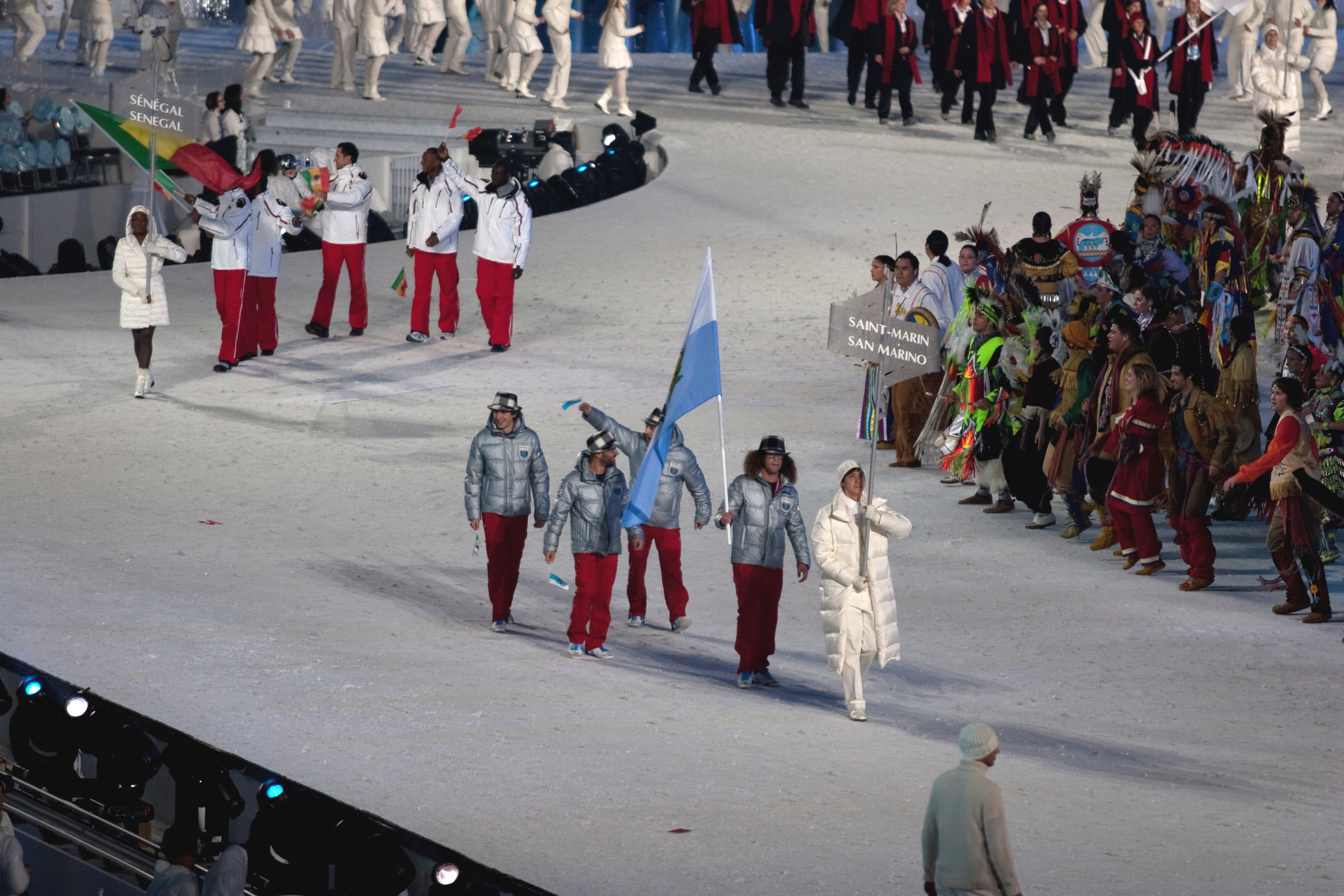
San Marino's delegation entering the stadium during the opening ceremonies.

== Background ==
San Marino first entered Olympic competition at the 1960 Summer Olympics in Rome. The nation did not enter a Winter Olympic Games until Innsbruck in 1976. Excepting the 1980 and 1998 Winter Olympics they have participated in every edition of the Winter Olympics since, making Vancouver the nation's eighth Winter Olympics appearance. Like the 2006 Olympics, the Sammarinesi delegation consisted of a single athlete, Marino Cardelli, returning for his second consecutive Olympics. Cardelli was chosen as the flag bearer for the opening ceremony, while Gian Luca Borgagni, the Chef de Mission for the delegation, was selected for the closing ceremony.

== Alpine skiing ==
San Marino qualified one athlete for alpine skiing. Marino Cardelli was 22 years old at the time of the Vancouver Olympics. His only event in Vancouver was the giant slalom held on 23 February. Cardelli posted a first run time of 1 minute and 40 seconds, over 23 seconds behind the leader. He stated, “My ankle is not very good and my form is not the best, But for me, arriving is a very special thing.” Later that day, his second run time was 1 minute and 44 seconds, 24 seconds behind the lap's fastest skier. His combined time of 3 minutes and 25 seconds placed him in 80th position, out of 81 competitors who finished both runs.

Athlete	Event	Run 1	Run 2	Finals	
Athlete	Event	Time	Time	Time	Rank
Marino Cardelli	Men's giant slalom	1:40.88	1:44.88	3:25.76	80

== See also ==
- San Marino at the 2010 Summer Youth Olympics
