= San Marino at the 2018 Winter Olympics =

- Flag of San Marino
- IOC code: SMR
- NOC: Sammarinese National Olympic Committee
- Website: www.cons.sm (in Italian)

in Pyeongchang, South Korea 9–25 February 2018
- Competitors: 1 (1 man) in 1 sport
- Flag bearer: Alessandro Mariotti
- Medals: Gold 0 Silver 0 Bronze 0 Total 0

Winter Olympics appearances (overview)
- 1976; 1980; 1984; 1988; 1992; 1994; 1998; 2002; 2006; 2010; 2014; 2018; 2022; 2026

San Marino participated at the 2018 Winter Olympics in Pyeongchang, South Korea, from 9 to 25 February 2018. The country's participation in the Games marked its tenth appearance at the Winter Olympics after having made its debut in the 1976 Winter Olympics.

The San Marino team consisted of lone athlete Alessandro Mariotti who competed in alpine skiing. Mariotti served as the country's flag-bearers during the opening and closing ceremonies. San Marino did not win any medal in the Games, and had not won a Winter Olympics medal as of these Games.

== Background ==
The National Olympic Committee of San Marino was formed on 16 April 1959. The Comitato Olimpico Nazionale Sammarinese was recognized by the International Olympic Committee (IOC) on 25 May of the same year. San Marino first participated in Olympic competition at the 1960 Summer Olympics, and have participated in most Olympic Games ever since. The 2018 Winter Olympics marked San Marino's tenth participation in the Winter Olympics after having made its debut in the 1976 Winter Olympics.

The 2018 Winter Olympics was held in Pyeongchang held between 9 and 25 February 2018. San Marino was represented by a single athlete Alessandro Mariotti who competed in alpine skiing. Mariotti served as the country's flag-bearers during the opening and closing ceremonies. San Marino did not win any medal in the Games, and had not won a Winter Olympics medal as of these Games.

== Competitors ==
San Marino sent a single athletes who competed in two events in alpine skiing.

Sport	Men	Women	Total
Alpine skiing	1	0	1
Total	1	0	1

== Alpine skiing ==
For National Olympic Committees not having athletes ranked in the top 500 in the International Ski Federation (FIS) ranking list on 17 January 2018, the basic qualification mark for the slalom and giant slalom events stipulated an average of less than 140 points as on 21 January 2018. The quotas were allocated further based on athletes satisfying other criteria with a maximum of 22 athletes (11 male and 11 female athletes) from a single participating NOC. Alessandro Mariotti met the basic qualification standard in the slalom and giant slalom categories. This was Mariotti's first and only representation in the Winter Olympic Games. Born in 1998, he has been competing in international alpine skiing events since 2014. He represented San Marino in the FIS Alpine World Ski Championships 2017 held at St.Moritz.

The slalom and giant slalom events were held at the Yongpyong Alpine Centre. The weather was cold and windy during the events, with multiple postponements and delays during the competition. In the men's giant slalom event, Mariotti crossed the finish line in just over one minute and 21 seconds to be ranked 75th amongst the 109 competitors. In the second run, he recorded a marginally better time, to finish 66th in the classification. With a combined time of over two minutes and 42 seconds, he finished about 24 seconds behind the eventual winner Marcel Hirscher in 65th place. In the men's slalom event, he did not register a finish.

Athlete	Event	Run 1		Run 2		Total	
Athlete	Event	Time	Rank	Time	Rank	Time	Rank
Alessandro Mariotti	Men's giant slalom	1:21.66	75	1:21.21	66	2:42.87	65
Alessandro Mariotti	Men's slalom	DNF					

== See also ==
- San Marino at the 2018 Summer Youth Olympics
