= Federica Selva =

Sammarinese alpine skier (born 1996)

Personal information
- Born: 7 June 1996 (age 30) Borgo Maggiore, San Marino
Medal record
Alpine skiing
Representing San Marino

Federica Selva (born 7 June 1996 in Borgo Maggiore) is a Sammarinese alpine skier. She competed for San Marino at the 2014 Winter Olympics in the giant slalom competition, and became the first female athlete to represent the country at the Winter Olympics as well.

== See also ==
- San Marino at the 2014 Winter Olympics
