= San Marino at the 2006 Winter Olympics =

- IOC code: SMR
- NOC: Sammarinese National Olympic Committee
- Website: www.cons.sm (in Italian)

in Turin
- Competitors: 1 (1 man) in 1 sport
- Flag bearers: Marino Cardelli (opening and closing)
- Medals: Gold 0 Silver 0 Bronze 0 Total 0

Winter Olympics appearances (overview)
- 1976; 1980; 1984; 1988; 1992; 1994; 1998; 2002; 2006; 2010; 2014; 2018; 2022; 2026

San Marino sent a delegation to compete at the 2006 Winter Olympics, in Turin, Italy from 10 to 26 February 2006. This was the nation's seventh appearance at a Winter Olympic Games since its debut in 1976. The delegation consisted of a single athlete, alpine skier Marino Cardelli. In his race, the giant slalom, he failed to finish the competition.

== Background ==
San Marino first entered Olympic competition at the 1960 Summer Olympics in Rome. The nation did not enter a Winter Olympic Games until Innsbruck in 1976. Excepting the 1980 and 1998 Winter Olympics, San Marino has participated in every edition of the Winter Olympics since, making Turin the nation's seventh Winter Olympics appearance. The Sammarinesi delegation consisted of a single alpine skier, Marino Cardelli. Cardelli would go on to also be the only Sanmarinesi competitor four years later in Vancouver. Cardelli was selected as the flag bearer for both the opening ceremony and the closing ceremony.

== Alpine skiing ==
Marino Cardelli was 18 years old at the time of the Turin Olympics. As he was the lowest ranked competitor in the giant slalom, he was last in the starting order on 20 February. He would be unable to finish the first run of the race, leaving him unranked for the competition.

| Athlete | Event | Final | | | |
| Athlete | Event | Run 1 | Run 2 | Total | Rank |
|---|---|---|---|---|---|
| Marino Cardelli | Men's giant slalom | did not finish | | | |
