= San Marino at the 2026 Winter Olympics =

- Flag of San Marino
- IOC code: SMR
- NOC: Sammarinese National Olympic Committee
- Website: www.cons.sm (in Italian)

in Milan and Cortina d'Ampezzo, Italy 6 February 2026 – 22 February 2026
- Competitors: 1 (1 man) in 1 sport
- Flag bearer (opening): Rafael Mini
- Flag bearer (closing): Rafael Mini
- Medals: Gold 0 Silver 0 Bronze 0 Total 0

Winter Olympics appearances (overview)
- 1976; 1980; 1984; 1988; 1992; 1994; 1998; 2002; 2006; 2010; 2014; 2018; 2022; 2026

San Marino competed at the 2026 Winter Olympics in Milan and Cortina d'Ampezzo, Italy, from 6 to 22 February 2026. The country's participation in the Games marked its twelfth appearance at the Winter Olympics after having made its debut in the 1976 Winter Olympics.

Alpine skier Rafael Mini was the country's flagbearer during the opening ceremony. Mini was also the country's flagbearer during the closing ceremony.

== Competitors ==
The following is the list of number of competitors participating at the Games per sport/discipline.

Sport	Men	Women	Total
Alpine skiing	1	0	1
Total	1	0	1

== Alpine skiing ==
San Marino qualified one male alpine skier through the basic quota.

Athlete	Event	Run 1		Run 2		Total	
Athlete	Event	Time	Rank	Time	Rank	Time	Rank
Rafael Mini	Men's giant slalom	1:29.88	70	1:22.68	64	2:52.56	65
Rafael Mini	Men's slalom	DNF					
