= Vincenzo Michelotti =

Sammarinese alpine skier (born 1996)

Personal information
- Born: 13 November 1996 (age 29) Borgo Maggiore, San Marino

Vincenzo Romano Michelotti (born 13 November 1996 in Borgo Maggiore, San Marino) is an alpine skier from San Marino. He will compete for San Marino at the 2014 Winter Olympics in the giant slalom competition. Michelotti was also selected to carry the Sammarinese flag during the opening ceremony.

Michelotti was also San Marino's only athlete at the 2012 Winter Youth Olympics.

Michelotti also plays football in San Marino Calcio youth system and competed at continental level with U-17 national team.

== See also ==
- San Marino at the 2014 Winter Olympics
