= 1988 Winter Olympics closing ceremony =

- Part of 1988 Winter Olympics
- Date: 28 February 1988; 38 years ago
- Time: 19:30 – 21:00 MST (UTC−7)
- Venue: McMahon Stadium
- Location: Calgary, Alberta, Canada; 51°4′13″N 114°7′17″W
- Filmed by: 1988 Olympic Radio and Television Organization (ORTO '88)

The closing ceremony of the 1988 Winter Olympics was held on February 28, 1988, beginning at 19:30 MST (3:30 UTC, February 29) at McMahon Stadium in Calgary, Alberta, Canada. The closing ceremony had 60,000 people in attendance, including 10,000 volunteers who received free admission. It marked the first time a Winter Olympics had a closing ceremony held outdoors.

The closing ceremonies consisted of a Parade of Athletes less formal than the opening ceremonies as athletes from all nations paraded together. The world's largest temporary ice rink was built in McMahon Stadium to showcase amateur figure skating teams as part of the closing ceremonies.

The Olympic flag was lowered and Mayor of Calgary Ralph Klein passed the flag to the president of the IOC who passed it on to Henri Dujol, Mayor of the French city of Albertville, the host of the 1992 Winter Olympics. After a speech by the president of the organizing committee for the Games, the president of the IOC proclaims the closing of the Calgary Games and the Olympic flame was slowly extinguished.

== Anthems ==
- National Anthem of Canada
- National Anthem of France
- (International Olympic Committee) Olympic Hymn
