= San Marino at the 2022 Winter Olympics =

- Flag of San Marino
- IOC code: SMR
- NOC: Sammarinese National Olympic Committee
- Website: www.cons.sm (in Italian)

in Beijing, China 4–20 February 2022
- Competitors: 2 (1 man and 1 woman) in 1 sport
- Flag bearers (opening): Matteo Gatti; Anna Torsani
- Flag bearer (closing): Matteo Gatti
- Medals: Gold 0 Silver 0 Bronze 0 Total 0

Winter Olympics appearances (overview)
- 1976; 1980; 1984; 1988; 1992; 1994; 1998; 2002; 2006; 2010; 2014; 2018; 2022; 2026

San Marino participated at the 2022 Winter Olympics in Beijing, China, from 4 to 20 February 2022. The country's participation in the Games marked its eleventh appearance at the Winter Olympics after having made its debut in the 1976 Winter Olympics.

The San Marino team consisted of two athletes– Matteo Gatti and Anna Torsani, who competed in alpine skiing. While both of them served as the country's flag-bearers during the opening ceremony, Gatti carried the flag during the closing ceremony. San Marino did not win any medal in the Games, and has not won a Winter Olympics medal as of these Games.

== Background ==
The National Olympic Committee of San Marino was formed on 16 April 1959. The Comitato Olimpico Nazionale Sammarinese was recognized by the International Olympic Committee (IOC) on 25 May of the same year. San Marino first participated in Olympic competition at the 1960 Summer Olympics, and have participated in most Olympic Games ever since. The 2022 Winter Olympics marked San Marino's eleventh participation in the Winter Olympics after having made its debut in the 1976 Winter Olympics.

The 2022 Winter Olympics was held in Beijing held between 4 and 20 February 2022. The San Marino team consisted of two athletes– Matteo Gatti and Anna Torsani, who competed in a single sport. While both of them served as the country's flag-bearers during the opening ceremony, Gatti carried the flag during the closing ceremony. San Marino did not win any medal in the Games, and had not won a Winter Olympics medal as of these Games.

== Competitors ==
San Marino sent two athletes who competed in four events in alpine skiing.

Sport	Men	Women	Total
Alpine skiing	1	1	2
Total	1	1	2

== Alpine skiing ==
=== Qualification ===
The basic qualification mark for the slalom and giant slalom events stipulated an average of less than 160 points in the list published by the International Ski Federation (FIS) as on 17 January 2022. The quotas were allocated further based on athletes satisfying other criteria with a maximum of 22 athletes (11 male and 11 female athletes) from a single participating NOC. Alpine skier Matteo Gatti met the basic qualification standard with 129.07 points in the slalom and 120.47 points in the giant slalom categories. In the women's category, Anna Torsani bettered the basic qualification standard with 154.50 points in the slalom and 158.12 points in the giant slalom categories. Subject to the other criteria, Gatti and Torsani qualified to participate in both the events at the games.

Gatti and Torsani were officially announced as the only representatives of San Marino at the Games. Both of them made their Olympic debut at the 2022 Winter Olympics. Born in 20101, Torsani has been competing in international alpine skiing events since 2017. Aged 21, Gatti had represented San Marino in the FIS Alpine World Ski Championships 2021.

=== Main event ===
In the men's giant slalom event held on 13 February 2022 at the Yanqing National Alpine Skiing Centre, Gatti completed his first run in 1:20.40 to be ranked 49th amongst the 87 competitors. However, he was disqualified during the second run and was not classified in the final classification. In the slalom event held on 16 February 2022, he crossed the finish line with a time of 1:08.52 to be ranked 49th after the first run. He improved in the second run by nearly five seconds, which enabled to him to be classified higher at 43rd in the overall classification.

In the women's giant slalom event held on 7 February 2022, Torsani completed her first run in 1:13.89 to be ranked 58th amongst the 80 competitors. Despite posting a slower time in the second run, she was classified 47th in the final classification as only 49 athletes completed the second run. She did not finish the first run in the women's slalom event.

Athlete	Event	Run 1		Run 2		Total	
Athlete	Event	Time	Rank	Time	Rank	Time	Rank
Matteo Gatti	Men's giant slalom	1:20.40	49	DSQ			
Matteo Gatti	Men's slalom	1:08.52	49	1:03.41	44	2:11.93	43
Anna Torsani	Women's giant slalom	1:13.89	58	1:15.37	48	2:29.26	47
Anna Torsani	Women's slalom	DNF		Did not advance			
