= WinSport =

Sporting non-profit organization in Calgary, Canada

WinSport Canada logo

The Calgary Olympic Development Association (CODA), operating as WinSport, is a non-profit organization based in Calgary, Alberta, Canada whose mandate is to provide training and development to Canada's Olympic athletes, and to maintain the facilities built for the 1988 Winter Olympics. The organization was founded in 1956 to bring the Olympics to Calgary, succeeding in its fourth attempt. WinSport has been credited with dramatically improving Canada's performance at the Olympics, as medal totals have increased at each subsequent Winter Games held since 1988, to a peak of 26 in the 2010 Winter Olympics.

== History ==
CODA was formed in 1956 with the aim of bringing the Winter Olympic Games to Calgary. It bid for both the 1964 and 1968 games, losing to Innsbruck, Austria and Grenoble, France, respectively. Aided by Peter Lougheed, CODA made a third bid for the 1972 games. The effort appeared to be a sure winner before environmentalists protested Calgary's bid, arguing that the games would cause irreparable damage to Banff National Park. Calgary once again lost, finishing second to Sapporo, Japan. CODA became dormant following the 1966 vote.

In 1979, CODA was resurrected as Calgary began its fourth attempt, initiating a bid for the 1988 games. Led by chairman Frank King, and relying on thousands of volunteers, CODA spent four years attempting to woo support, attending every major sporting event it could to sell International Olympic Committee (IOC) members on Calgary. Calgary faced strong bids from Falun–Åre, Sweden and Cortina d'Ampezzo, Italy, the latter bidder pressuring the IOC to "punish" the Calgary bid for Canada's boycott of the 1980 Summer Olympics in Moscow. Calgary nonetheless won the bid at a vote held in Baden-Baden, West Germany on September 30, 1981.

CODA gave way to the Calgary Olympic Committee (Olympiques Calgary Olympics '88, or OCO '88), which organized the games themselves. The Calgary games generated a C$90 million profit, of which $70.5 million was created into an endowment fund for CODA to maintain and operate the Olympic facilities following the games. Today, that fund has grown to $185 million. The Toronto Star challenged the claim of profitability in 1999 following Toronto's failed bid for the 1996 Summer Olympics, claiming that $461 million in government spending was not accounted for in the final figures.

With the completion of the games, CODA rededicated itself to maintaining the facilities left in the legacy of the games, and in developing Canada's Olympic athletes. CODA is credited with contributing to Canada's dramatic improvement at the Winter Olympics, as the nation has seen an increase in podium finishes in every games since Calgary, growing to 26 medals at the 2010 Winter Games from just five at Calgary.

On January 23, 2009, CODA began operating as the Canadian Winter Sport Institute, or "WinSport", the first such institution in Canada.

== Facilities ==
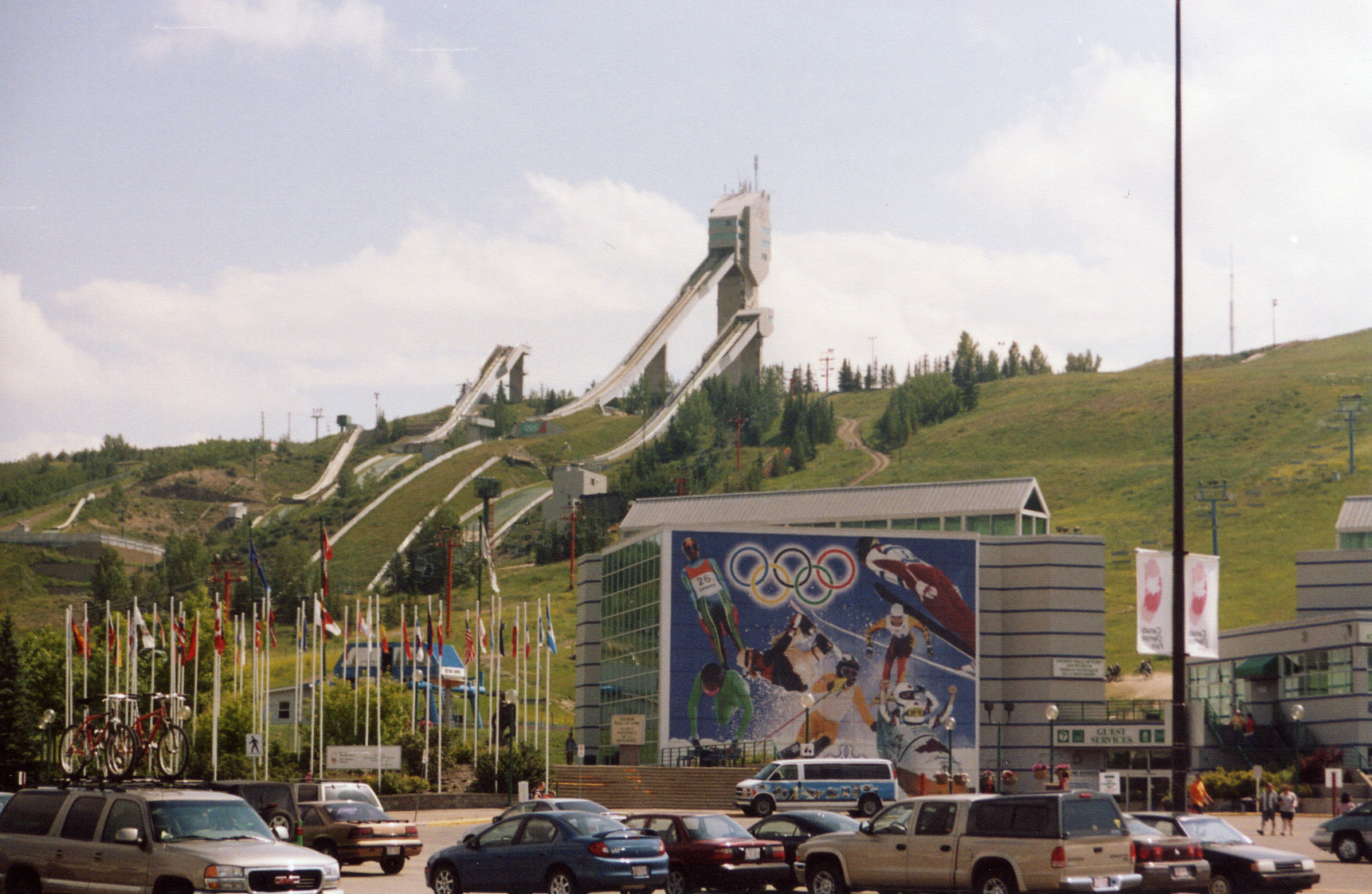
Canada Olympic Park is one of the most visible legacies of the 1988 games

WinSport maintains several facilities built for the 1988 games. Chief among them is Canada Olympic Park (COP). The primary facility of Canada's first Centre of Sport Excellence, COP still receives over one million visitors per year. COP is also home to Canada's Sports Hall of Fame.

The Olympic Oval was the first covered speed skating venue in North America, and remains one of the fastest speed skating surfaces in the world. Over 150 world records have been set at the Oval. The Oval continues to host international speed skating events. It also served as the home arena for the Calgary Inferno women's ice hockey team.

WinSport also runs the National Sport School in partnership with the Calgary Board of Education. Founded in 1994, the National Sport School is specifically designed for Olympic calibre students in grades nine through 12, allowing them to compete internationally without compromising their studies. 20 current or former students at the school represented Canada at the 2006 Winter Olympics.
