= Fabio Guardigli =

Sammarinese alpine skier (born 1968)

Personal information
- Nationality: Sammarinese
- Born: 21 October 1968 (age 56)

Sport
- Sport: Alpine skiing

Fabio Guardigli (born 21 October 1968) is a Sammarinese alpine skier. He competed in three events at the 1988 Winter Olympics.
