= Alessandro Mariotti =

Sammarinese alpine skier

Personal information
- National team: San Marino
- Born: 5 November 1998 (age 28)

Sport
- Country: San Marino
- Sport: Alpine Skiing

Achievements and titles
- Olympic finals: 2016 Winter Youth Olympics – 30th (Giant Slalom) 32nd (Slalom) 2018 Winter Olympics

Alessandro Mariotti (born 5 November 1998 in San Marino) is a San Marinese Alpine Skier. He is the sole competitor for San Marino at the 2018 Winter Olympics.

== Olympic Events ==
Mariotti contended at the European Youth Olympic Festival in Malbun, Liechtenstein in 2015. He ranked overall 37th in the slalom and 57th in the Giant Slalom.

Mariotti competed in the slalom and giant slalom for San Marino at the 2016 Winter Youth Olympics in Lillehammer, Norway. He came in 30th in the giant slalom and 32nd in the slalom.

== FIS tournaments ==
He made appearances at FIS World Ski Championships in both Vail, Colorado in 2015, and St. Moritz, Switzerland, in 2017. He came in 90th and 52nd in the giant slalom, respectively.

Mariotti also participated in several FIS tournaments where in December 2017, he ranked 20th in slalom in Ravna planina, Bosnia and Herzegovina. A week later, Mariotti ranked 11th and 14th in slalom and 12th and 14th in giant slalom at Kolašin, Montenegro.

== 2018 Winter Olympics ==
On 27 January 2018, at a press conference, it was announced that Mariotti qualified to compete in the 2018 Winter Olympics and would be the sole representative from San Marino. He will participate in the men's giant slalom. Mariotti was the flag bearer for San Marino in the 2018 Winter Olympics Parade of Nations.
