= Anna Torsani =

Sammarinese alpine skier

Personal information
- Born: October 10, 2001 (age 24) Borgo Maggiore, San Marino

Skiing career
- Sport: Alpine skiing
- Disciplines: Slalom

Olympics
- Teams: 1 - 2022
- Medals: 0 (0 gold)

World Championships
- Teams: 0
- Medals: 0 (0 gold)

World Cup
- Seasons: 0
- Wins: 0
- Podiums: 0
- Overall titles: 0
- Discipline titles: 0

Anna Torsani (born October 10, 2001) is a Sammarinese alpine skier from Borgo Maggiore, San Marino. She focuses on the events of slalom skiing. She is one of two athletes to represent San Marino at the 2022 Winter Olympics.

Torsani was the flagbearer for San Marino at the 2022 Winter Olympics, along with fellow alpine skier Matteo Gatti.

== Personal life ==
Torsani is a graduate student in Nursing Sciences.
