= San Marino at the 2014 Winter Olympics =

- Flag of San Marino
- IOC code: SMR
- NOC: Sammarinese National Olympic Committee
- Website: www.cons.sm (in Italian)

in Sochi, Russia 7 February 2014 – 23 February 2014
- Competitors: 2 (1 man and 1 woman) in 1 sport
- Flag bearer (opening): Vincenzo Michelotti
- Flag bearer (closing): Federica Selva
- Officials: 3
- Medals: Gold 0 Silver 0 Bronze 0 Total 0

Winter Olympics appearances (overview)
- 1976; 1980; 1984; 1988; 1992; 1994; 1998; 2002; 2006; 2010; 2014; 2018; 2022; 2026

San Marino sent a delegation to compete at the 2014 Winter Olympics in Sochi, Russia from 7 to 23 February 2014. This was the country's ninth appearance and the first time a woman was representing the nation at the Winter Olympics. The delegation consisted of three officials and two competitors, alpine skiers Vincenzo Michelotti and Federica Selva. Both of them took part in giant slalom races and were unranked in the competition. Michelotti was disqualified and Selva could not finish her race.

== Background ==
San Marino debuted at the 1960 Summer Olympics held in Rome, Italy and entered the Winter Olympics in 1976 at Innsbruck, Austria. Since then, it has participated in every Winter Olympics except the 1980 and 1998 ones held in the United States and Japan respectively, making Sochi the nation's ninth Winter Olympics appearance. The Sammarinesi delegation consisted of two alpine skiers, Vincenzo Michelotti and Federica Selva accompanied by three officials. Michelotti was the flag bearer for the opening ceremony while Selva for the closing ceremony.

== Alpine skiing ==
According to the final quota allocation released on 20 January 2014, San Marino had two athletes in qualification position. Federica Selva did not complete the first run of her race, thus receiving an official placement of did not finish.

Vincenzo Michelotti was the youngest Olympian at these Games at 17 years and 98 days, racing in the giant slalom. His left ski fell off during his run, and he crashed. Officials disqualified him when they determined that made his run not continuous.

Athlete	Event	Run 1		Run 2		Total	
Athlete	Event	Time	Rank	Time	Rank	Time	Rank
Vincenzo Michelotti	Men's giant slalom	DSQ					
Federica Selva	Women's giant slalom	DNF					

== See also ==
- San Marino at the 2014 Summer Youth Olympics
