= Gian Matteo Giordani =

Sammarinese alpine skier (born 1984)

Personal information
- Nationality: Sammarinese
- Born: 15 February 1984 (age 42)

Sport
- Sport: Alpine skiing

Gian Matteo Giordani (born 15 February 1984) is a Sammarinese alpine skier. He competed in the men's giant slalom at the 2002 Winter Olympics.
