= Mike Crocenzi =

Sammarinese bobsledder (born 1969)

Personal information
- Nationality: Sammarinese
- Born: 16 July 1969 (age 55); Warren, Michigan, United States

Sport
- Sport: Bobsleigh

Mike Crocenzi (born 16 July 1969) is a Sammarinese bobsledder. He competed with Dino Crescentini in the two man event at the 1994 Winter Olympics.

== See also ==
- San Marino national bobsleigh team
