= Jason Gasperoni =

German alpine skier (born 1963)

Personal information
- Nationality: German
- Born: 14 October 1963 (age 61)

Sport
- Sport: Alpine skiing

Jason Gasperoni (born 14 October 1963) is a German alpine skier. He competed in three events at the 1992 Winter Olympics.
