= Dino Crescentini =

Sammarinese bobsledder

Personal information
- Nationality: Sammarinese
- Born: 22 September 1947; San Marino
- Died: 22 June 2008 (aged 60); Bowmanville, Ontario, Canada

Sport
- Sport: Bobsleigh

Dino Crescentini (22 September 1947 – 22 June 2008) was a Sammarinese bobsledder and racing driver. He competed in the two man event at the 1994 Winter Olympics. He was killed while taking part in a motor race in Canada in 2008.

== Biography ==
Crescentini was born in San Marino in 1947, and moved to Michigan during the 1970s. He was living in Rochester Hills when he qualified to compete at the Winter Olympics. Along with Mike Crocenzi, Crescentini competed in the two man event at the 1994 Winter Olympics in Lillehammer, Norway. Crescentini was also the flag bearers for San Marino at the Winter Olympics.

Following the Olympics, Crescentini became a race car driver. In June 2008, at a racing festival at Mosport Park, Crescentini was killed after his car flipped over and hit a wall. He was taken to the hospital in Bowmanville where he died.

== See also ==
- San Marino national bobsleigh team
