= Maurizio Battistini =

Sammarinese alpine skier (born 1957)

Personal information
- Nationality: Sammarinese
- Born: 5 April 1957 (age 67)

Sport
- Sport: Alpine skiing

Maurizio Battistini (born 5 April 1957) is a Sammarinese alpine skier. He competed in two events at the 1976 Winter Olympics. In 1986 he joined the board of the "Gente del Titano" association formed by San Marino citizens living in Rimini, serving as its president from 1987 to 1993. In 2004, he received the appointment of San Marino consul at the Consulate of the Republic of San Marino in Rimini.
