= Riccardo Stacchini =

Sammarinese alpine skier (born 1965)

Personal information
- Nationality: Sammarinese
- Born: 29 October 1965 (age 59); Borgo Maggiore, San Marino

Sport
- Sport: Alpine skiing

Riccardo Stacchini (born 29 October 1965) is a Sammarinese alpine skier. He competed in two events at the 1988 Winter Olympics.
