= 1988 Winter Olympics opening ceremony =

- Part of 1988 Winter Olympics
- Date: 13 February 1988; 38 years ago
- Time: 13:30 – 14:30 MST (UTC−7)
- Venue: McMahon Stadium
- Location: Calgary, Alberta, Canada; 51°4′13″N 114°7′17″W
- Filmed by: 1988 Olympic Radio and Television Organization (ORTO '88)
- Footage: Opening ceremony highlights on YouTube

The opening ceremony of the 1988 Winter Olympics was held on February 13, 1988, beginning at 1:30 p.m. MST (16:30 UTC, February 13) at McMahon Stadium in Calgary, Alberta, Canada.

The event was officially opened by Governor General Jeanne Sauvé on behalf of Queen Elizabeth II. An audience of 60,000 spectators was in attendance at the venue, with 2,600 athletes and officials.

== Preparations ==
Planning for the opening ceremony was trusted to the head of the volunteer ceremonies committee Eddie Rogers. Rogers had previously planned the Calgary Stampede's grandstand shows. Rogers hired Paddy Sampson, a former CBC employee as the executive producer of the ceremonies. Sampson had much of the music used in the games recorded in Calgary, and had Tommy Banks brought in to direct the composition for the parade of athletes. Sampson found volunteers for the country-western dancing by scouring country and western bars in Southern Calgary, and asking strong dancers to volunteer for the opening ceremonies.

The 1988 Winter Olympic opening ceremonies were planned to be under some changes at Olympic Charter made in 1986. Previously, the parade of athletes took place partway through the ceremonies, stand during parts of the ceremony, and athletes departed prior to the end of the ceremonies. This ultimately allowed the athletes to watch and participate in the rest of the ceremony alongside the spectators in the stands.

The Calgary organizers wanted the audience to be part of the visual spectacle, and provided each spectator with a coloured poncho to wear. The ponchos were paid for by Coca-Cola, but after realizing the IOC's restriction on sponsorships during the opening ceremonies, the organizers sent the ponchos to a nearby prison where inmates were tasked with flipping the 62,000 ponchos inside-out and removing the labels. Several of the ponchos were defaced by inmates with obscenities and other statements, leading organizers to sort through the ponchos to remove the offensive garments and order replacements.

In preparations for the opening and closing ceremonies, temporary bleachers were installed in McMahon Stadium to increase the seated occupancy capacity to 60,000. The Olympic cauldron was constructed out of copper with platforms created to hold the flame, a 65-meter teepee was built behind the cauldron.

Approximately 8,000 volunteers were brought on to perform in the opening ceremonies, led by eight choreographers and one artistic director. Rehearsals began for most volunteers 12 weeks in advance of the ceremonies and took place on average twice a week.

The 1988 Winter Olympics were the first for many years to enforce the Olympic Charter rule limiting the attendance of the Opening Ceremony Parade to only athletes and four officials per team. Each team was provided marching passes which allowed access for athletes and four additional passes for officials on February 11. OCO'88 notes that some teams traded their marching passes to other teams who wanted more than four officials to participate in the opening ceremony.

During the opening ceremonies, 850 pigeons were released at McMahon Stadium. The temperature prior to the opening ceremonies was −9 °C (16 °F), with a brisk wind.

== Program ==
The opening ceremonies began with a choir of 1,100 singers from Across Alberta singing the theme song of the 1988 Games, Come Together. Following the song, more than 700 performers from 40 cultural groups participated in a salute to the Olympics, including the Calgary Stampede Showband and five First Nations. Afterwards the flags of the 57 participating nations were raised by Canadian Cadets, and the Governor General Jeanne Sauvé arrived and the Royal Canadian Mounted Police performed a short version of their Musical Ride.

The parade of athletes began with competitors entering from the North end of McMahon Stadium and circling around the field. National teams entered in alphabetical order based on their nation's name in English, as the host nation, Canada was the last team to enter, led by flag-bearer and figure skater Brian Orser. A western two-step dance with 360 dancers followed with live music provided by Ian Tyson and Gordon Lightfoot singing Four Strong Winds and Alberta Bound.

The official opening began with OCO'88 Chairman Frank King introducing IOC president Juan Antonio Samaranch and Governor General Jeanne Sauvé, followed by King giving a welcome speech, then Samaranch, followed by Sauvé declaring the Games officially open on behalf of Queen Elizabeth II. Afterwards 1,100 Calgary children gave a performance illustrating the Olympic sports.

A flag exchange occurred with representatives from Oslo, and the Olympic torch was carried into the stadium by Cathy Priestner and Ken Read, they momentarily shared the flame with wheelchair Olympian Rick Hansen, and handed off to 12-year-old Robyn Perry, a figure skater, to light the Olympic flame. As the flame illuminated, a flyover by the Canadian Air Force Snowbirds filled the sky with coloured smoke representing the five colours of the Olympic Games.

Gilles Vigneault's Mon Pays played as a celebration of Canadian bilingual culture, followed by the administration of the Olympic Oaths, and singing of O Canada. The opening ceremony ended with performers, athletes and spectators singing a recital of Can't You Feel It, a song composed by Canadian David Foster for the Games.

== Anthems ==
- National Anthem of Canada
- (International Olympic Committee) Olympic Hymn
