= 1992 Winter Olympics opening ceremony =

- Part of 1992 Winter Olympics
- Date: 8 February 1992
- Venue: Théâtre des Cérémonies
- Location: Albertville, France; 45.6616°N 6.3694°E
- Also known as: The Olympic Circus (French: Le cirque olympique) or The Five Ring Circus (French: Le cirque des cinq anneaux)
- Filmed by: Organisme de radio télévision olympique '92 (ORTO '92)
- Footage: https://www.olympicchannel.com/en/video/detail/albertville-1992-opening-ceremony/

The opening ceremony of the 1992 Winter Olympics took place at Théâtre des Cérémonies in Albertville, France, on 8 February 1992.

== Ceremony ==
It is themed around an innovative way for a theatre.

=== Opening ===
First, the group of performers signed a message welcoming everyone to the ceremony.

=== Parade of Nations ===
The flag bearers of 64 National Olympic Committees entered the stadium informally in single file, ordered by the French alphabet, and behind them marched the athletes with any distinction or grouping by nationality.

== Opening ==
OCO'92 President Jean-Claude Killy delivered a speech in French, welcoming everyone. IOC President Juan Antonio Samaranch delivered a speech in French and the President of France François Mitterrand declared the XVI Olympic Winter Games in Albertville opened.

Figure skater Surya Bonaly recited the Olympic Oath.

== Anthems ==
- (International Olympic Committee) Olympic Hymn
- Séverine du Peloux - National Anthem of France
