= 1988 Winter Olympics =

Multi-sport event in Calgary, Canada

XV Olympic Winter Games
- Emblem of the 1988 Winter Olympics (Note: The emblem is a stylized, pentagon-shaped, snowflake and maple leaf. It is made up of five large and five small letters of "C." The large "C"s symbolizes the country of Canada. The small "c"s symbolizes the city of Calgary. The whole emblem is above the Olympic rings.)
- Location: Calgary, Canada
- Motto: Come Together in Calgary (French: Rassemblez-vous à Calgary)
- Nations: 57
- Athletes: 1,426 (1,111 men, 315 women)
- Events: 46 in 6 sports (10 disciplines)
- Opening: February 13, 1988
- Closing: February 28, 1988
- Opened by: Governor General Jeanne Sauvé
- Closed by: IOC President Juan Antonio Samaranch
- Cauldron: Robyn Perry
- Stadium: McMahon Stadium

The 1988 Winter Olympics, officially known as the XV Olympic Winter Games (French: XV^{es} Jeux olympiques d'hiver) and commonly known as Calgary 1988 were a multi-sport event held from February 13 to 28, 1988, with Calgary, Canada, as the main host city. This marks the most recent time that two consecutive Olympic Games were hosted in North America; the 1984 Summer Olympics were hosted in Los Angeles. It was the first Winter Olympic Games to be held for 15 days, like the counterpart Summer Olympic Games. Most of the events took place in the city of Calgary; the snow events were shared by Nakiska ski resort in Kananaskis Country at the west of the city and the Canmore Nordic Centre Provincial Park in the town of Canmore. It was the last Winter Olympics that took place during the Cold War.

In 1988, a record 57 National Olympic Committees (NOC) sent a total of 1,424 athletes to these Games. These Winter Olympics would be the last attended for both the Soviet Union and East Germany NOCs. As had been the case at the 1976 Summer Olympics, which were held in Montreal, Canada did not win an official gold medal on their home soil, although they won three gold medals in unofficial demonstration events. The Finnish ski jumper, Matti Nykänen, and the Dutch speed skater, Yvonne van Gennip, won three individual gold medals each. The 1988 Winter Olympics were also remembered for the "heroic failure" of the British ski jumper, Michael Edwards, and the debut of the Jamaica national bobsleigh team. Both of them became subjects of major feature films about their participation in these Games, respectively Eddie the Eagle in 2016 and Cool Runnings in 1993.

At approximately C$829 million, the Calgary Games were the most expensive Olympics ever held at the time, as all the necessary infrastructure was built from scratch. The facilities that were built for these Winter Olympics helped the host region to turn into the heart of Canada's elite winter sports program, under the tutelage of WinSport. The five purpose-built venues are still used for training and hosting various winter sporting events.

== Host city selection ==
1988 Winter Olympics bidding results
City	Country	Round	
City	Country	1	2
Calgary	Canada	35	48
Falun	Sweden	25	31
Cortina d'Ampezzo	Italy	18	—

Calgary made its fourth attempt at hosting the Winter Games when it bid for the 1988 Winter Olympic Games, which also marked Canada's seventh bid for the Winter Olympic Games. Montreal made the first Canadian bid for the Winter Games in 1956 and won the rights to host the 1976 Summer Olympics, and Vancouver made attempts to host the 1976 and 1980 Games. Calgary, alongside neighbouring Banff, under the leadership of the Calgary Olympic Development Association (CODA), submitted bids for the Winter Games in 1964, 1968, and 1972. However, CODA went dormant in 1966 after losing three consecutive bids. In 1978, Frank King and Bob Niven of Calgary's Booster Club took over the organization's leadership and revived CODA. King and Niven consulted former Olympic Sprinter and CODA founder, Ernie McCullough, and politician Arthur Ryan Smith, who had worked on previous bids, for guidance on the project.

In October 1979, CODA secured the Canadian Olympic Association's (COA) support for Canada's official bid to host the 1988 Winter Olympics, winning over a competing bid by Vancouver with a vote of 27–9. Calgary's bid was at the time the most ambitious for the Winter Olympics ever, as the city lacked winter sports facilities and almost everything would have to be built from scratch. CODA proposed constructing all new venues, arguing that if Calgary was awarded the Games, Canada's inventory of training facilities would increase significantly. The Vancouver bidding committee argued that Calgary's bid represented a "Big-ticket Games" idea, and estimated to cost nearly three times what Vancouver was expected to pay to host the Winter Olympics. Vancouver's bid was based on already developed infrastructure, including the Expo 86 precinct, the Pacific Coliseum and Whistler Blackcomb, which later served as the basis for the successful 2010 Winter Olympics bid and the later unsuccessful 2030 Winter Olympics bid.

CODA then spent two years building local support for the megaproject, selling CA$5 memberships to approximately 80,000 of Calgary's 600,000 residents. Calgary also secured CA$270 million in funding from the federal (CA$200 million) and provincial governments. Some civic leaders, including then-mayor Ralph Klein, travelled around the world to lobby IOC delegates. The arrival of the National Hockey League's (NHL) newly relocated Calgary Flames from Atlanta in 1980 drove the city to construct a new multi-use arena that would later be named the Olympic Saddledome, demonstrating to the IOC Calgary's determination to host the Winter Olympics.

The Olympic bid itself emphasized the unique cultural and natural characteristics who mark the Calgary Metropolitan Region and the Alberta Province and also canadian prairies landscapes, as a perfect places for hosting the Winter Olympics. At the bidding documents, the city was marketed with a capitalist, oil-driven and vibrant economy that also had mountain playgrounds, extensive wilderness, and a rodeo culture. When the two images of Calgary and Alberta were brought together, they seemed to be contrasting; however, they complemented each other as part of extensive and intense bidding lobby process.

Calgary was one of three finalists during the 1988 Winter Olympics bid process. The other two were Falun, Sweden, and Cortina d'Ampezzo, Italy. The Italian town (comune) had before hosted the 1956 Winter Olympics and was seen by many as the favorite. The vote was held on September 30, 1981, in Baden-Baden, West Germany, during the 84th IOC Session and 11th Olympic Congress. After Cortina d'Ampezzo was eliminated in the first round of balloting, Calgary won in the second and final round of balloting over Falun, by a margin of 17 votes. The announcement of CODA's victory sent the delegates in Baden-Baden and Calgary residents into singing and dancing. It also made then Alberta premier, Peter Lougheed, burst openly into tears in front of the cameras. Later, Ralph Klein sang a rendition of Mac Davis' It's Hard to Be Humble. It was the first Winter Olympics awarded to Canada and the second Olympic Games overall, following the 1976 Summer Olympics in Montreal. Cortina d'Ampezzo, along with Milan, would get to host the 2026 Winter Olympics.

Olympic historians, John E. Findling and Kimberly D. Pelle noted that once the Games were awarded to Calgary, the cultural and community aspects of the bid were pushed aside by the newly formed Calgary Olympic organizing committee called the Olympiques Calgary Olympics '88 (OCO'88). It then proceeded to take on a "vigorous, resilient, and impersonal corporate business strategy" based in the work made by Los Angeles 1984 Organizing Committee (LAOCOG) toward the planning and operation of the Games.

== Venues ==
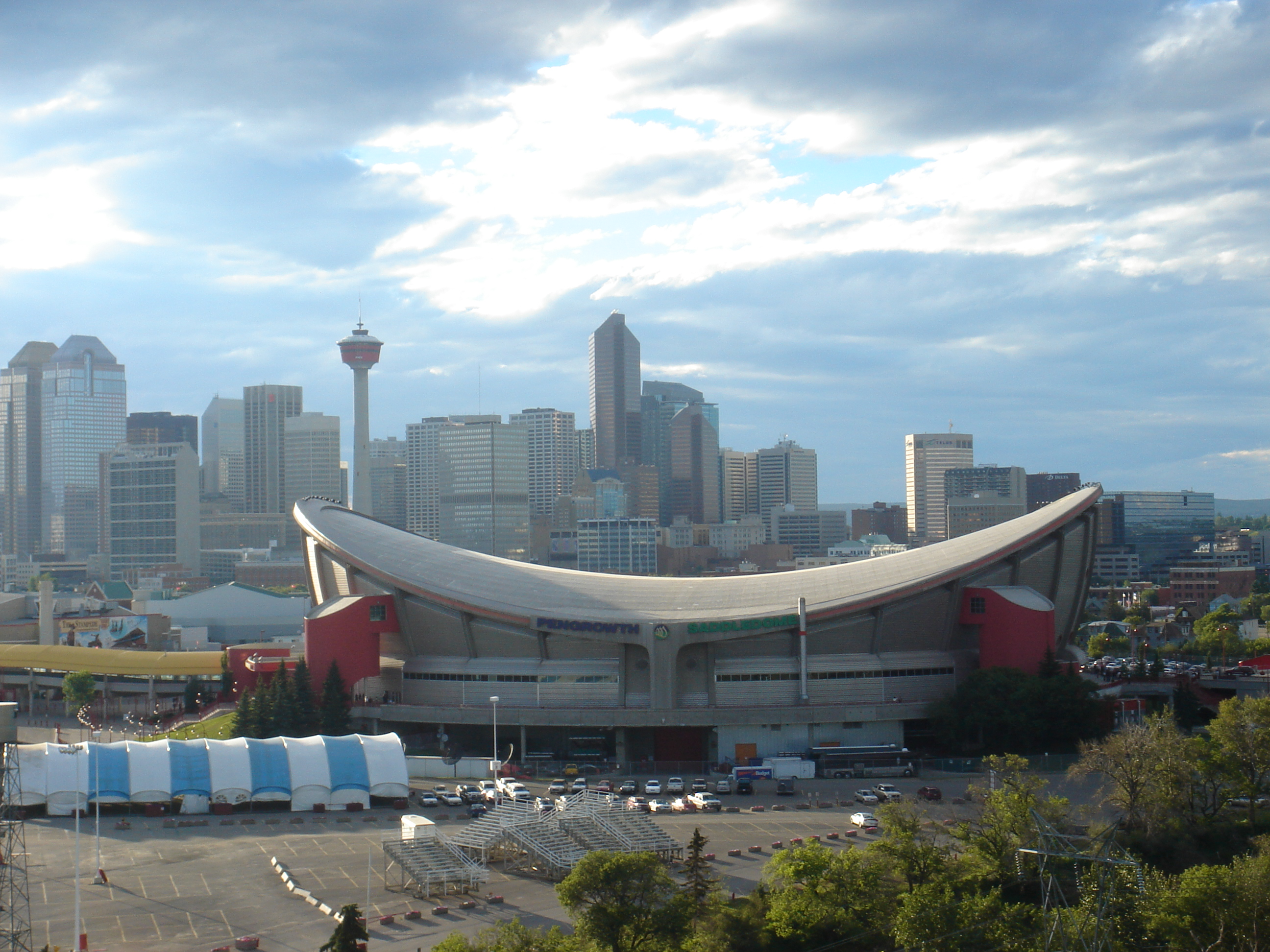
The IIHF called the Olympic Saddledome "the finest international rink in the world". It is also the largest hockey arena ever used at the Olympics with a capacity of 20,016 in 1988.

Bill Pratt was a former general contractor who took over as OCO'88 president in 1983. He was the main manager that oversaw the construction of the Olympic megaproject. Donald Jacques, a former general manager of the Calgary Exhibition and Stampede, once said, "Because of him, everything was built on time and on budget." However, Bill Pratt was controversial by rubbing many of his colleagues the wrong way. One former co-worker once predicted back in 1983: "He will get everything built. There may not be many (of us) left around to enjoy it, but he'll get it done." His relations with the news media were also strained at times. He had barely settled into his new position when the Calgary press media began criticizing OCO'88 for excessive secrecy and for awarding Olympic contracts to Calgary's PR firm Francis Williams and Johnson Ltd. Pratt was a director of that firm, before accepting the organizing committee job. OCO'88 had insisted that there was no conflict of interest involved in the whole process. Therefore, Pratt declared: "I have been nailed for a lot, but that does not bother me. The record stands". After the 1988 Winter Olympics bid was won in 1981, OCO'88 made a new technical assessment and had to re-plan all the originally proposed competition venues except for the few that already existed and were within the campus of the University of Calgary.

McMahon Stadium, the primary outdoor facility used mainly by the Canadian Football League's (CFL) Calgary Stampeders and inside of the University of Calgary and had originally been chosen to host only the opening ceremonies and the Saddledome was chosen to be the place of the closing ceremonies. But with the constant revisions of the project, the later addition of 4 more days in competition and mainly the gigantic demands for tickets, the Organizing Committee decided to move the closing ceremony to the Stadium which held twice the capacity of the Saddledome. The last time that the two Winter Olympic ceremonies were held at the same venue was at the 1960 Winter Olympics in Squaw Valley, California.

The 1988 Winter Olympics' five main all-purpose venues were created at a significant cost at that time. Three of them are located within Calgary and the other two are located west of the city. First, the Olympic Saddledome was planned to be the main venue of the games, hosting ice hockey and figure skating finals.This arena is also part of Stampede Park and was expected to cost C$83 million, but a cost overrun pushed it to nearly C$100 million and caused a nine-month delay. Second, the Olympic Oval was built on the campus of the University of Calgary for C$40 million. Contrary to what was proposed in the bid in which this infrastructure would be outdoors, throughout the process it was realized that it would have to be 100% covered and is the first fully enclosed 400-metre long track speed skating in the world, to protect the athletes and public from bitterly cold weather and the Chinook winds. Third, Canada Olympic Park (formerly called the Paskapoo Ski Hill) was renovated for C$200 million and is located on the western outskirts of Calgary. This most expensive venue of these Winter Olympics hosted the men's bobsleigh, luge, and men's ski jumping and its portion of the Nordic combined events. Also, it hosted some events of the demonstration sport of freestyle skiing.

From the west of Calgary, the other two main all-purpose venues were built at the foothills of the Rocky Mountains. First, the Canmore Nordic Centre was 90% funded by the province of Alberta, for C$17.3 million. It is located beside the town of Canmore and it hosted cross-country skiing, plus its men's portion of the Nordic combined, and the men's biathlon events. It was projected that the area could become a year-round destination for Albertans, by facilitating and accelerate Canmore's economic transition away from coal mining to tourist attraction. However, the Nakiska (Cree meaning "to meet") ski resort was the most controversial and polemic complex built for these Winter Olympics. It is located on Mount Allan (inside Kananaskis Country) and it hosted the alpine skiing events.It cost around C$25 million to Alberta government funds. This venue drew a lot of criticisms because of the various environmental concerns, the rejection by International Ski Federation (FIS) of slopes for each of the 10 events in the program and the use of artificial snow due to the lack of natural snow on that season. After the first inspections, the International Ski Federation (FIS) officials noted the venue's lack of technical difficulties needed for the Olympic competition. Therefore, these FIS delegates proposed some major changes in the slopes in an action to cause bigger difficulties. These modifications were met with praise from Olympic alpine skiing competitors. Like at Canada Olympic Park, this venue also hosted some freestyle skiing events as a demonstration sport.

Three other existing facilities served as secondary competition venues for the Games. The first one, was the Max Bell Centre hosted the demonstration sports of curling and short track speed skating. The Father David Bauer Olympic Arena and the Stampede Corral shared the functions of secondary venues for the ice hockey tournament and the figure skating preliminaries. Though the Stampede Corral did not support the International Ice Hockey Federation's (IIHF) standard-sized Olympic ice surface, OCO'88 was able to convince the IIHF to sanction the ice rink for Olympic competition, in exchange for a C$1.2 million payment.

== Participating National Olympic Committees ==
A record 57 National Olympic Committees (NOCs) entered athletes at the 1988 Winter Olympics, with eight more NOCs than any other previous Olympic Winter Games. 1,109 men and 315 women, for a total of 1,424 athletes, participated in these Games. Fiji, Guam, Guatemala, Jamaica, the Netherlands Antilles and the Virgin Islands had their Winter Olympics debut in 1988.

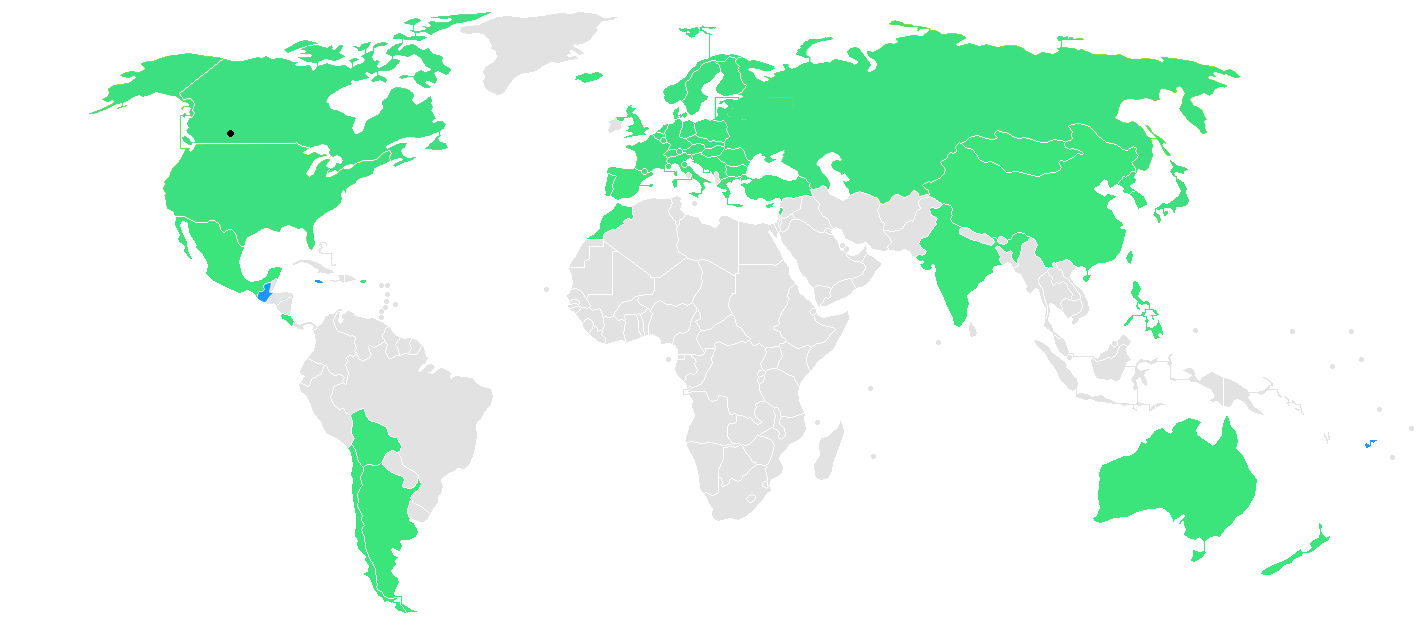
Participating NOCs

Participating National Olympic Committees
- Andorra (4)
- Argentina (15)
- Australia (19)
- Austria (81)
- Belgium (1)
- Bolivia (6)
- Bulgaria (26)
- Canada (112) (host)
- Chile (5)
- China (13)
- Chinese Taipei (13)
- Costa Rica (2)
- Cyprus (3)
- Czechoslovakia (60)
- Denmark (1)
- East Germany (53)
- Fiji (1)
- Finland (53)
- France (68)
- Great Britain (48)
- Greece (6)
- Guam (1)
- Guatemala (6)
- Hungary (5)
- Iceland (3)
- India (3)
- Italy (58)
- Jamaica (4)
- Japan (48)
- Lebanon (4)
- Liechtenstein (13)
- Luxembourg (1)
- Mexico (11)
- Monaco (3)
- Mongolia (3)
- Morocco (3)
- Netherlands (11)
- Netherlands Antilles (2)
- New Zealand (9)
- North Korea (6)
- Norway (63)
- Philippines (1)
- Poland (32)
- Portugal (5)
- Puerto Rico (9)
- Romania (11)
- San Marino (5)
- South Korea (22)
- Soviet Union (101)
- Spain (12)
- Sweden (67)
- Switzerland (70)
- Turkey (8)
- United States (118)
- Virgin Islands (6)
- West Germany (90)
- Yugoslavia (22)

=== Number of athletes by National Olympic Committees ===
IOC Letter Code	Country	Athletes
USA	United States	118
CAN	Canada	112
URS	Soviet Union	101
FRG	West Germany	90
AUT	Austria	81
SUI	Switzerland	70
FRA	France	68
SWE	Sweden	67
NOR	Norway	63
TCH	Czechoslovakia	60
ITA	Italy	58
GDR	East Germany	53
FIN	Finland	53
GBR	Great Britain	48
JPN	Japan	48
POL	Poland	32
BUL	Bulgaria	26
KOR	South Korea	22
YUG	Yugoslavia	22
AUS	Australia	19
ARG	Argentina	15
CHN	China	13
LIE	Liechtenstein	13
TPE	Chinese Taipei	13
ESP	Spain	12
MEX	Mexico	11
HOL	Netherlands	11
ROM	Romania	11
NZL	New Zealand	9
PUR	Puerto Rico	9
TUR	Turkey	8
BOL	Bolivia	6
GRE	Greece	6
GUA	Guatemala	6
PRK	North Korea	6
ISV	Virgin Islands	6
CHI	Chile	5
HUN	Hungary	5
POR	Portugal	5
SMR	San Marino	5
AND	Andorra	4
JAM	Jamaica	4
LIB	Lebanon	4
CYP	Cyprus	3
ISL	Iceland	3
IND	India	3
MON	Monaco	3
MGL	Mongolia	3
MAR	Morocco	3
CRC	Costa Rica	2
AHO	Netherlands Antilles	2
BEL	Belgium	1
DEN	Denmark	1
FIJ	Fiji	1
GUM	Guam	1
LUX	Luxembourg	1
PHI	Philippines	1
Total		1,424

== Sports ==
There were 46 events contested in 6 sports (10 disciplines). In addition, there were 22 events in 4 demonstration sports and disciplines that have no official status in the overall medal tally.

1988 Olympic Winter Games Sports program
- Alpine skiing (10)
- Biathlon (3)
- Bobsleigh (2)
- Cross-country skiing (8)
- Figure skating (4)
- Ice hockey (1)
- Luge (3)
- Nordic combined (2)
- Ski jumping (3)
- Speed skating (10)

Demonstration Sports (No official medals awarded)
- Curling (2) (details)
- Disabled skiing (4) (details)
- Freestyle skiing (6) (details)
- Short track speed skating (10) (details)

== Calendar ==
All dates are in Mountain Time Zone (UTC-7)

OC	Opening ceremony	●	Event competitions	1	Event finals	CC	Closing ceremony

February	13th Sat	14th Sun	15th Mon	16th Tue	17th Wed	18th Thu	19th Fri	20th Sat	21st Sun	22nd Mon	23rd Tue	24th Wed	25th Thu	26th Fri	27th Sat	28th Sun	Events
Ceremonies	OC															CC	—N/a
Alpine skiing		1	●	1		1	●	1	1	1		1	1	1	1		10
Biathlon								1			1			1			3
Bobsleigh								●	1						●	1	2
Cross country skiing		1	1		1		1		1	1			1		1		8
Figure skating		●		1	●	●		1	●	●	1	●	●		1		4
Ice hockey	●	●	●	●	●	●	●	●	●	●	●	●	●	●	●	1	1
Luge		●	1	●	1		1										3
Nordic combined											●	1			●	1	2
Ski jumping		1			1			1									3
Speed skating		1			1	1		1	1	1	1			1	1	1	10
Daily medal events		4	2	2	4	2	2	5	4	3	3	2	2	3	4	4	46
Cumulative total		4	6	8	12	14	16	21	25	28	31	33	35	38	42	46	46
February	13th Sat	14th Sun	15th Mon	16th Tue	17th Wed	18th Thu	19th Fri	20th Sat	21st Sun	22nd Mon	23rd Tue	24th Wed	25th Thu	26th Fri	27th Sat	28th Sun	Total events

=== Weather conditions ===
The weather conditions were a problem facing OCO'88 during the Games, with temperatures ranging from −28 to 22 °C (−18 to 72 °F). After an unexpectedly freezing opening ceremony, the outdoor competitions scheduled to start the next day had to be postponed. This ended up affecting the men's downhill skiing event at Nakiska which was postponed for one day, due to Chinook winds blowing up to 160 km/h. The women's downhill event also experienced the same scenario. With the ski jumping venue facing north at Canada Olympic Park (COP), the same winds also disrupted those events, with the large hill event being postponed four times. It also disrupted the Nordic combined events, in which the ski jumping part had to be postponed as well. This situation ended up causing something unprecedented in the history of the Winter Olympics, as for the first time both the ski jumping and Nordic combined cross-country skiing events were contested in a single day. Despite using artificial cooling, the bobsleigh and luge events did not need to be rescheduled; however, several races had to be postponed because of the high temperatures recorded and also because of the dirt that was carried away by these winds.

== Preparations ==
The official poster of the 1988 Winter Olympics

=== Olympic organizing committee (OCO'88) ===
The Calgary Olympic Development Association (CODA) Board of Directors had originally 25 members. It was chaired by Frank King, followed by former Mayors Ralph Klein and Ross Alger, and other prominent Calgarians. The executive committee president was Robert Niven. The Olympic Organizing Committee (OOC) was formed by utilizing many of the original board of directors members. It was initially started with 11 members and was grown to 25 members by October 1983. It grew further to 29 members by 1985, when former Alberta premier, Peter Lougheed, was added to the list. An Olympic biographer, Kevin Wamsley, noted that the CEO Frank King, President Bill Pratt, Ralph Klein, and former COA President Roger Jackson had collectively the most influence on all aspects of these Winter Olympics. This organizing committee took a hierarchical form for planning these Olympics, which caused consternation from some staff, volunteers, and people in executive roles. The original staff, who were at odds with the current management structure, were either fired or willingly resigned. Also, there were claims that some of the volunteers were verbally abused. As a result, David Leighton resigned as OOC President in 1982, after only five months on the job. Therefore, Bill Pratt, a former general manager of the Calgary Stampede, became the new OCOG's president shortly afterwards. The City of Calgary and the Canadian Olympic Association (COA) delegated officially all Olympic responsibilities, including staging the Winter Olympics under the Olympic Charter, to the newly formed OCO'88 in February and September 1983 respectively.

However, conflicts within OCO'88 grew in the public eye and a review of the entire management structure was conducted after Ralph Klein threatened it with a public inquiry in 1986. Thus, Frank King remained as CEO, but with the addition of more full-time staff. Also, more than 9,000 volunteers were registered who were allocated to the most diverse areas. Despite these changes, there was still some animosity within OCO'88. Kevin Walmsley noted that Bill Pratt and Frank King continued to have a very tense relationship and that any movement caused sparks with each other. Some members of the media commented that the changes made further alienated the general public, with a host broadcaster producer, Ralph Mellanby, describing it as "an oilman's and cattleman's Calgary thing." Long-time IOC member Dick Pound, on behalf of the International Olympic Committee (IOC), went on record to say that the IOC grew increasingly frustrated, as it saw the actions of OCO'88 as a refusal to collaborate with them.

=== Television ===
The 1988 Winter Olympic Games coincided with a shift in television policy by the International Olympic Committee and growing enthusiasm by broadcasters in the United States. Amendments to the Olympic Charter in 1977 established a policy mandating joint television rights involving the IOC and the local organizing committee and was enshrined in the 1981 bid agreement for the Calgary games.

The joint negotiating committee convened in 1984 late-January, some weeks before the Sarajevo 1984 Winter Games at the IOC's president residency at the Lausanne Palace were held to negotiate the Calgary television contracts with American broadcasters. The negotiating committee was represented by Dick Pound for the IOC, Bill Wardle for OCO'88 and consultant Barry Frank. The co-negotiating committee designed a new tender process for the television rights bid with an emphasis on creating a level playing field for all broadcasters. For the first time, the negotiations were based on a series of sealed bids and representatives from ABC, CBS and NBC vied for the opportunity to broadcast the Games.

After six rounds of sealed bids, the ABC delegation led by producer Roone Arledge was successful with an agreement paying a record US$309 million (CA$386 million Canadian at the time) in exchange for exclusive rights for the games. CBS exited the bidding process after the second round with a final offer of $257 million, while ABC and NBC both reached the fifth round with an offer of $300 million. In the sixth and final stage, the IOC and OCO'88 decided a coin flip would determine which of ABC or NBC had the right to submit the first bid or defer, a decision neither network supported. NBC's president of sports Arthur A. Watson elected to call the coin-flip, although he remained silent on the first flip, so a second coinflip was required, and NBC won with a choice of "heads", and after 30 minutes of deliberation submitted a $304 million bid. ABC's representative Arledge made a quick phone call to executive Fred Pierce, and ABC submitted a $309 million bid, exceeding NBC's bid by $5 million. ABC's record-setting bid was immediately controversial, first Arledge had exceeded the maximum allowable bid set by ABC's executives by $34 million, and in the coming weeks ABC's coverage of the 1984 Winter Olympics which cost $91.5 million returned poor Nielsen ratings. Early estimates speculated the network would lose $50-$60 million televising the games. The Wall Street Journal described the NBC agreement as the "biggest prize of the Winter Olympics". The deal which was at the time the highest amount ever paid for a sporting event, allowed OCO'88 to announce the Games would be debt-free.

The negotiations with American television broadcasters were in sharp contrast to negotiations for Western European rights with the European Broadcasting Union quickly closing an exclusive deal with the IOC for US$5.7 million led by Juan Antonio Samaranch and Marc Hodler on behalf of the IOC. The Calgary Herald headline after the announcement negatively reflected on the "bargain" the European network received, and OCO'88 chairman Frank King publicly expressed his disappointment with the IOC. Samaranch's argument for providing for a privileged negotiation with EBU was ensuring European viewers had equal access and coverage of the games, something he did not believe would occur if private networks from each nation were provided with the opportunity to bid. Dick Pound was also critical of the decision and argued more revenue could be brought in from BBC and RAI alone and the privileged status suppressed the willingness of the EBU to make a market-value bid on the games.

The CTV Television Network won the bid to broadcast the Games in Canada in December 1983, paying CA$4.5 million for the exclusive rights. CTV also won the $23.5 million contract to serve as the host broadcaster, responsible for the manpower and equipment to televise the games. In 1978, while the bid was strengthened, CBC and CTV signed an agreement that if Calgary were the eventual winner, the two broadcasters would create a consortium in which the purchase of television rights would take place jointly. The previous arrangement had CBC provide full coverage for Summer Games with CTV broadcasting a nightly summary, while CTV had the rights to Winter Games with CBC broadcasting a nightly summary. The nightly summary of the Games was also televised on CBC.

Japan's broadcast rights were awarded to NHK in July 1986 for US$3.9 million.

OCO'88 made several alterations to the Olympic program as part of efforts to ensure value for its broadcast partners. Now, the premier and main events, including ice hockey and figure skating, were scheduled for prime time and the Games were lengthened to 15 days from the previous 12 to ensure three weekends of coverage. However, a significant downturn in advertising revenue for sporting events resulted in ABC forecasting significant financial losses on the Games. Calgary organizers appreciated their fortunate timing in signing the deal. King described the timing of the contract with ABC as "the passing of the sun and the moon at the right time for Calgary". The revenue growth from broadcasting was significant for the Calgary Games, OCO'88 generated $324.9 million in broadcast rights, which was a significant growth over an eight-period (the 1980 Lake Placid Games generated US$20.7 million). ABC had net losses of more than $60 million, and broadcast rights to the 1992 Winter Olympics were later sold to the CBS network for $243 million, a 20 per cent reduction compared to Calgary.

=== Ticketing controversies ===
A series of ticket-related scandals plagued the organizing committee as the Games approached, resulting in widespread public anger. Demand for tickets was high, particularly for the main events which had sold out a year in advance. Residents had been promised that only 10 per cent of tickets would go to "Olympic insiders", IOC officials and sponsors, but OCO'88 was later forced to admit that up to 50 percent of seats to top events had gone to insiders. The organizing committee, which was subsequently chastised by mayor Klein for running a "closed shop", admitted that it had failed to properly communicate the obligations it had to supply IOC officials and sponsors with priority tickets.

These events were preceded by the ticketing manager for OCO'88 being charged with theft and fraud after he sent modified ticket request forms to Americans that asked them to pay in United States funds rather than Canadian and to return them to his company's post office box rather than the office of the organizing committee. At that time, the American dollar was trading 40 cents higher than the Canadian dollar, resulting in significantly higher than anticipated revenue through currency conversion. The ticket manager maintained his innocence claiming he was used as a scapegoat and sponsor credit card Visa was responsible for the error, despite his claims, the ticketing manager was convicted of fraud, theft, and forgery, and sentenced to 5 years in prison.

Organizers attempted to respond to public concern by asking sponsors to consider reducing their orders and by paying $1.5 million to add 2,600 seats to the Saddledome, as well as increase capacity for ski jumping, alpine skiing and the opening ceremonies. This led to a change of the venue of the closing ceremonies from Saddledome to McMahon Stadium, as the stadium capacity was about two times bigger than the indoor venue. King also noted that the Calgary Games offered a then-record 1.9 million tickets for sale, three times the amount available at Sarajevo or Lake Placid and that 79 percent of them were to be allocated to Calgarians. By the start of the 1988 Winter Games, a record of over 1.4 million tickets had been sold, a figure that eclipsed the previous three Winter Games combined. In the OCO'88's final report, the Committee admits the culmination of fraud charges, a large portion of premier tickets requested by Olympic insiders, and poor communications led to a negative public reaction to the ticketing process.

For the first time in the history of the Olympics, both summer and winter, the Organizing Committee worked with a refund policy for returned or unused tickets. When an event was postponed by at least 24 hours, the ticketholder was eligible for a refund. Due to weather issues, the 8 events that were scheduled for the first 24 hours had to be rescheduled, resulting in 130,000 ticket refunds totalling CA$2.9 million, with transactions handled by the Royal Bank of Canada.

=== Community ===
Hidy and Howdy were the mascots of the Calgary Games.

The city of Calgary, whose Calgary Stampede event relies heavily on volunteers, attracted over 22,000 people to sign up for more than 9,400 volunteer posts during the Olympics. Also, for the first time, a "Homestay" program was created and several local families opened their homes to visitors from around the world, and others were renting their rooms or houses to those who could not stay in pay a reserve in a hotel.

Klein was among those who felt it necessary that the event be community driven, a decision which allowed the city's welcoming spirit to manifest. The Games' mascots, Hidy and Howdy, were designed to evoke images of "western hospitality". The smiling, cowboy-themed polar bears were popular across Canada. Played by a team of 150 students from Bishop Carroll High School, the sister-brother pair made up to 300 appearances per month in the lead-up to the Games. From their introduction at the closing ceremonies of the Sarajevo Games in 1984 until their retirement at the conclusion of the Calgary Games, the pair made about 50,000 appearances. The iconic mascots graced signs welcoming travellers to Calgary for nearly two decades until they were replaced in 2007. The mascot's names "Hidy" and "Howdy" were chosen by a public contest.

=== Finances ===
Revenue and Expenses for the 1988 Winter Olympic Games Organizing Committee
Revenue	$CAD in thousands
Television Rights	325,870
Tickets	41,936
Corporate Partners	88,016
Total Government Contributions (Note: Does not include capital expenditures by the Government of Canada (additional $151 million), Government of Alberta (additional $127 million) and City of Calgary (additional $43 million).)	52,210
Government of Canada	49,000
Government of Alberta	3,000
Other	210
Recoveries	35,646
Interest	15,152
Revenue Total	558,830
Expenses	$CAD in thousands
Facilities	88,416
Operations	95,983
Communications	29,660
Culture	23,189
Executive	6,956
Finance	42,437
Marketing	62,222
Sports	8,240
Team'88 Services	20,286
Technology	65,379
Contributions to Sports	78,425
Interest	2,620
Provision	2,951
Expenses Total	526,764
Surplus	32,066

The 1988 Winter Olympic Games were the most expensive Games, summer or winter, to be held at that time, with total expenses exceeding CA$879.6 million. (Note: The Boston Globe lists the Games' expenses at CA$829 million, while the OCO'88 reports the committee spent CA$558.8 million, in addition to federal, provincial and municipal capital expenditures of CA$320.8 million, resulting in a total of CA$879.6 million. The total does not include services rendered by the three levels of government.) The high cost was anticipated, as organizers were aware at the outset of their bid that most facilities would have to be constructed. The venues, constructed primarily with public money, were designed to have lasting use beyond the Games and were planned to become the home of several of Canada's national winter sports teams. The record-breaking cost of the Calgary Olympics came in stark contrast to the original projections during the 1981 bid, which estimated a total cost of CA$218 million, split between CA$126 million in capital costs and CA$92 million in operating costs. The significant growth in capital expenditures came despite the three levels of government taking over projects which constituted nearly half of the original budgeted capital projects.

The primary source of revenue for OCO'88 was the lucrative television contracts, bringing in CA$325.9 million (58.3 per cent of revenue), the absolute majority coming from American broadcasters, followed by corporate sponsorships at CA$88 million (15.8 per cent of revenue), and ticket sales of CA$41.9 million (7.5 per cent of revenue). Of the total expenses for the Games (CA$879.6 million), the Government of Canada contributed CA$200 million (22.7 per cent), the Government of Alberta contributed CA$130 million (14.8 per cent), and the City of Calgary contributed CA$43 million (4.9 per cent). The CA$320.8 million of government capital contributions not directly included in OCO'88's revenue statements included the Government of Canada constructing the CA$72.2 million Canada Olympic Park, and CA$40 million for the Olympic Oval. Provincial expenses included CA$14.4 million to build the Canmore Nordic Centre, and CA$25.3 million to build Nakiska. All three governments contributed to the CA$97.7 million Olympic Saddledome. Of OCO'88's reported revenue of CA$526.8 million, CA$110 million was paid to the IOC as a share of television and market rights, and an additional CA$7 million was paid to the United States Olympic Committee for rights to broadcast the Games in the United States, and CA$3 million was reimbursed to NOC's for accommodation fees at the Games.

The Games were a major economic boom for the city, which had fallen into its worst recession in 40 years following the collapse of both oil and grain prices three years before the games. A report prepared for the city in January 1985 estimated the games would create 11,100 man-years of employment and generate CA$450 million in salaries and wages. In its post-Games report, OCO'88 estimated the Olympics created CA$1.4 billion in economic benefits across Canada during the 1980s, 70 percent within Alberta, as a result of capital spending, increased tourism and new sporting opportunities created by the facilities.

== Torch relay ==
The 1988 Olympic torch relay began on November 15, 1987, when the torch was lit at Olympia and Greek runner Stelios Bisbas began what was called "the longest torch run in history". The flame arrived in St. John's, Newfoundland on the Atlantic Ocean two days later and over 88 days, travelled west across the then 10 Canadian provinces and two territories. It passed through most major cities, north to the Arctic Ocean at Inuvik, Northwest Territories, then west to the Pacific Ocean at Victoria, British Columbia before returning east to Alberta, and finally Calgary. The torch covered a distance of 18,000 kilometres (11,000 mi), the greatest distance for a torch relay in Olympic history until the 2000 Summer Olympics, and a sharp contrast to the 1976 Summer Olympics when the relay covered only 775 kilometres (482 mi).

The identity of the final torchbearer who would light the Olympic cauldron was one of the Organizing Committee's most closely guarded secrets. The relay began at St. John's with Barbara Ann Scott and Ferd Hayward representing Canada's past Olympians and ended with Ken Read and Cathy Priestner carrying the torch into McMahon Stadium representing the nation's current Olympians. They then stopped to acknowledge the contribution of parathlete Rick Hansen and his "Man in Motion" tour before handing the torch to 12-year-old Robyn Perry, an aspiring figure skater who was selected to represent the future of the Olympic Movement three years before the IOC changed the year of the Winter Games, to light the cauldron.

=== Olympic Torch ===
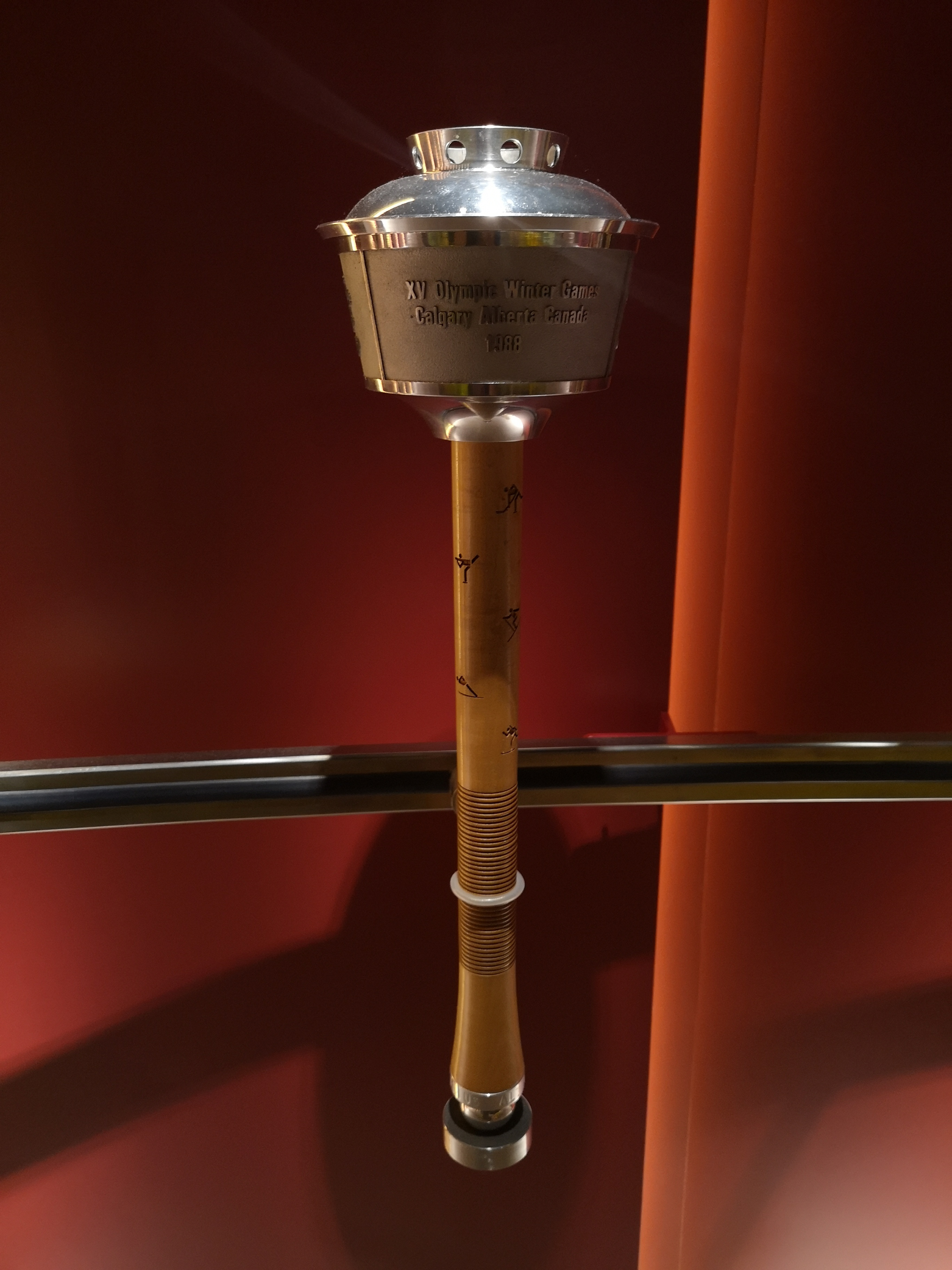
1988 Winter Olympic Torch

The design of the Olympic Torch for the Calgary games was a reproduction of the main landmark building of the Calgary skyline, the Calgary Tower. The National Research Council Canada developed the design for the Torch, the base of the torch is made of maple wood, the national tree of Canada, aluminum, and hardened steel, all 100% collected in Canadian territory. The torch was designed to remain lit despite the extreme conditions of Canadian winters. The Torch had to be light enough for relay runners to carry comfortably, and the final design came in at 60 centimetres in length and 1.7 kilograms in weight. The maple handle portion included laser-incised pictograms of the 10 official Olympic Winter sports, and lettering was engraved on the steel caldron portion. The torch used a mixed type of three fuels (gasoline, kerosene and alcohol) to allow a continuous burn during the unpredictable Canadian winter. Approximately 100 torches were manufactured for the Games.

== Event highlights ==
The 1988 Winter Games began on the afternoon of February 13 with a $10 million opening ceremony in front of 60,000 spectators at McMahon Stadium that featured 5,500 performers, an aerial flyover by the Royal Canadian Air Force's Snowbirds, the parade of nations and the release of 1,000 homing pigeons. Canadian composer David Foster performed the instrumental theme song ("Winter Games") and its vocal version ("Can't You Feel It?"), while internationally recognized Canadian folk/country musicians Gordon Lightfoot singing Alberta Bound and Ian Tyson performing Four Strong Winds were among the featured performers. Governor General Jeanne Sauvé opened the Games on behalf of Queen Elizabeth II as an estimated 1.5 billion people watched the ceremony.

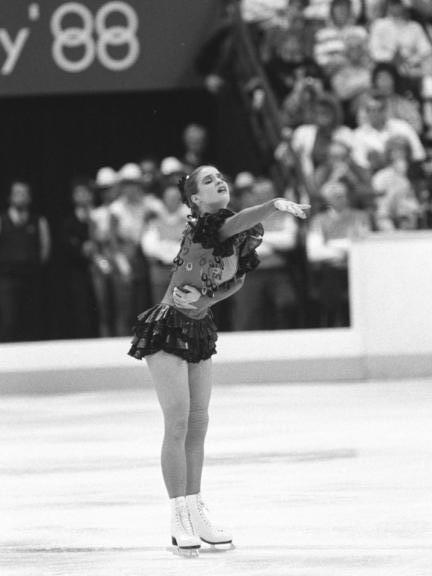
Katarina Witt won gold in women's figure skating

The weather was a dominant story throughout much of the Games, as strong chinook winds that brought daily temperatures as high as 17 °C (63 °F) wreaked havoc on the schedules for outdoor events. Events were delayed when winds were deemed unsafe for competitors and organizers used artificial snow making equipment to ensure skiing venues were properly prepared. It was the first time in Olympic history that alpine events were held on artificial snow. The Games were also marred by the death of the Austrian ski team's doctor, Joerg Oberhammer, on February 25 after a collision with another skier threw him underneath a working snow grooming machine at Nakiska, crushing and killing him instantly. The incident was ruled an accident.

The top individual competitors at the Olympics were Finnish ski jumper Matti Nykänen and Dutch speed skater Yvonne van Gennip as they each won three gold medals. Italy's Alberto Tomba won gold in two skiing events, his first of five career Olympic medals en route to becoming the first alpine skier to win medals at three Winter Games. East Germany's Katarina Witt defended her 1984 gold medal in women's figure skating, capturing a second gold in Calgary. Her compatriot Christa Rothenburger won the gold medal in the 1000 metre race in speed skating, then went on to win a silver medal in the team sprint cycling event at the 1988 Summer Games to become the only person in Olympic history to win medals at both Olympic Games in the same year. The Soviet Union won gold in ice hockey as Nordic neighbours Finland and Sweden took silver and bronze, respectively.

As it had in 1976, Canada again failed to win an official gold medal as the host of an Olympic Games. Canadians won three gold medals in demonstration events, including by Sylvie Daigle as one of her five medals in short-track speed skating. Canada's top official performances came in figure skating where Brian Orser and Elizabeth Manley each won silver medals. Promoted by the media as the "Battle of the Brians"—the competition between Orser and American rival Brian Boitano—and the "Battle of the Carmens"—between Witt and American rival Debi Thomas, who had both elected to skate to Bizet's Carmen in their long programs—were the marquee events of the Games. Boitano won the gold medal over Orser by one-tenth of a point. Witt won the gold while Thomas won the bronze medal. Manley was not viewed as a medal contender, but skated the greatest performance of her career to come within a fraction of Witt's gold medal-winning score.

American speed skater Dan Jansen's personal tragedy was one of the more poignant events of the Games as he skated the 500 metre race mere hours after his sister Jane died of leukemia. A gold medal favourite, Jansen chose to compete as he felt it is what his sister would have wanted. Viewers around the world witnessed his heartbreak as he fell and crashed into the outer wall in the first quarter of his heat. In the 1000 metre race four days later, Jansen was on a world record pace when he again fell. After failing again in Albertville, Jansen finally won a gold medal at the 1994 Lillehamer Games.

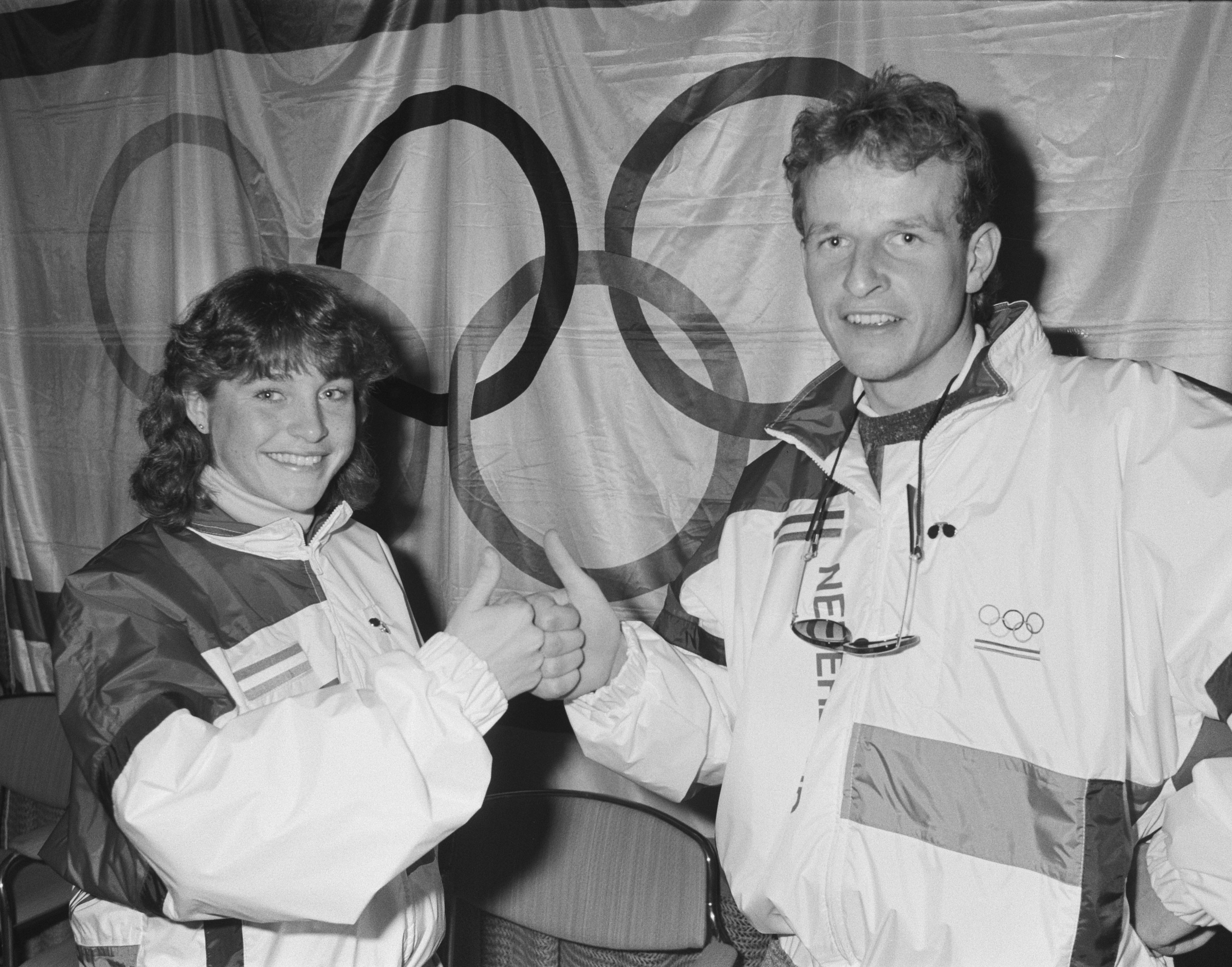
The Netherlands' Yvonne van Gennip (left) won three gold medals in Calgary

One of the most popular athletes from the games was British ski jumper Michael Edwards, who gained infamy by placing last in both the 70 and 90 metre events finishing 70 and 53 points behind his next closest competitor, respectively. Edwards' "heroic failure" made him an instant celebrity; he went from earning £6,000 per year as a plasterer before the Games to making £10,000 per hour per appearance afterward. Left embarrassed by the spectacle he created, the IOC altered the rules following Calgary to eliminate each nation's right to send at least one athlete and set minimum competition standards for future events. Regardless, the President of the Organizing Committee, Frank King, playfully saluted Edwards' unorthodox sporting legacy, which would also be commemorated with a 2016 feature film, Eddie the Eagle.

The Jamaican bobsleigh team, making their nation's Winter Olympic debut, was also popular in Calgary. The team was the brainchild of a pair of Americans who recruited individuals with strong sprinting ability from the Jamaican military to form the team. Dudley Stokes and Michael White finished the two-man event in 30th place out of 41 competitors and launched the Jamaican team into worldwide fame. The pair, along with Devon Harris and Chris Stokes, crashed in the four-man event, but were met with cheers from the crowd as they pushed their sled across the finish line. Their odyssey was made into the 1993 movie Cool Runnings, a largely fictionalized comedy by Walt Disney Pictures.

== Medal table ==
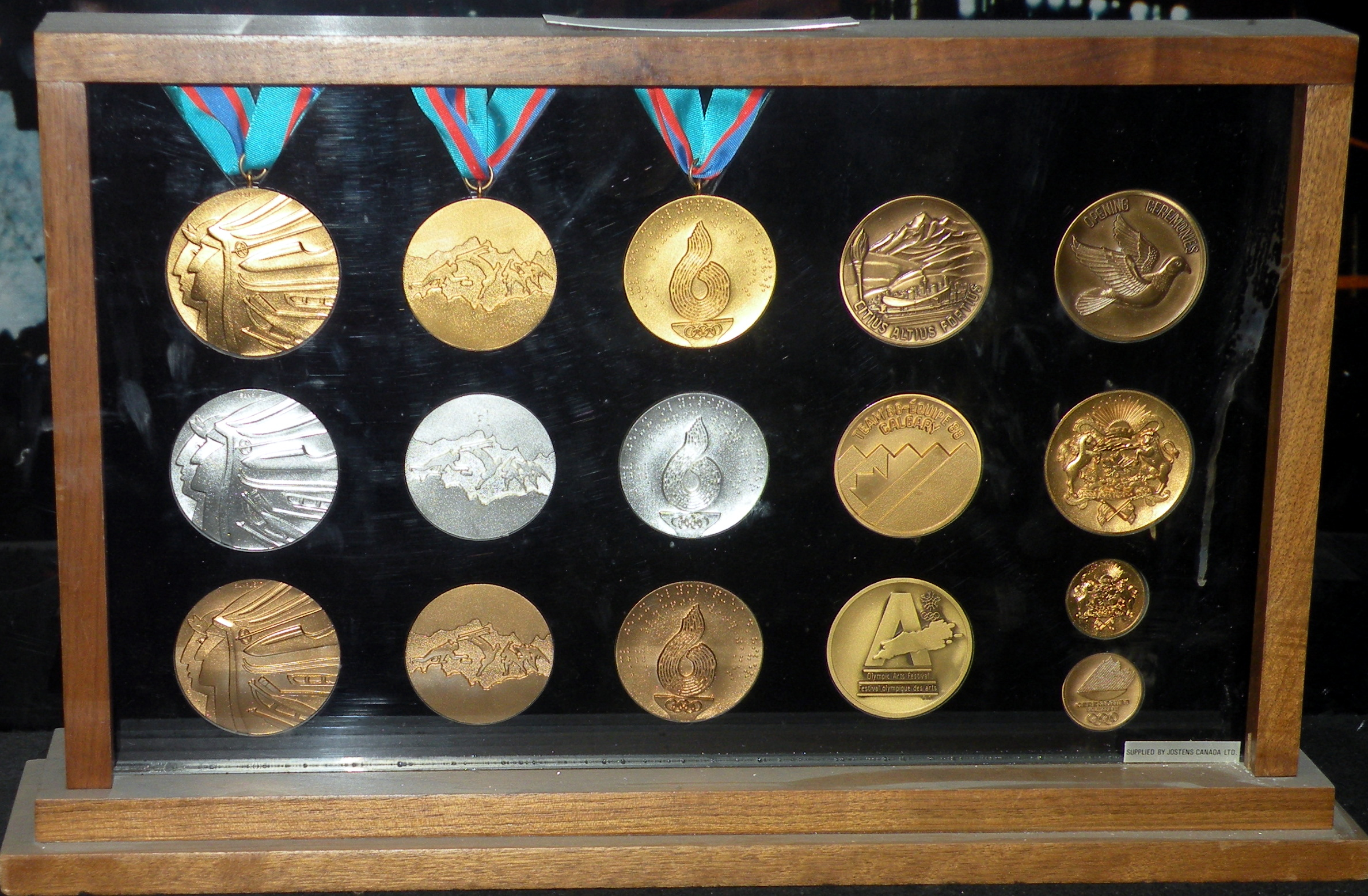
A set of medals from the Games on display at the Scotiabank Saddledome in Calgary.

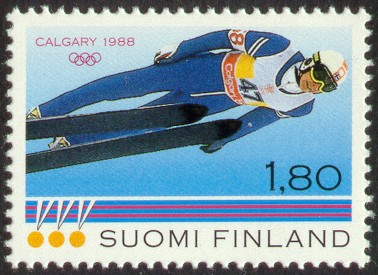
Postage stamp depicting Matti Nykänen at the Calgary Winter Olympic Games

* Host nation (Canada)

Rank	Nation	Gold	Silver	Bronze	Total
1	Soviet Union	11	9	9	29
2	East Germany	9	10	6	25
3	Switzerland	5	5	5	15
4	Finland	4	1	2	7
5	Sweden	4	0	2	6
6	Austria	3	5	2	10
7	Netherlands	3	2	2	7
8	West Germany	2	4	2	8
9	United States	2	1	3	6
10	Italy	2	1	2	5
11	France	1	0	1	2
12	Norway	0	3	2	5
13	Canada*	0	2	3	5
14	Yugoslavia	0	2	1	3
15	Czechoslovakia	0	1	2	3
16	Japan	0	0	1	1
16	Liechtenstein	0	0	1	1
Totals (17 entries)		46	46	46	138

=== Podium sweeps ===
Date	Sport	Event	NOC	Gold	Silver	Bronze
February 18	Luge	Women's singles	East Germany	Steffi Walter-Martin	Ute Oberhoffner-Weiß	Cerstin Schmidt
February 25	Cross-country skiing	Women's 20 kilometre freestyle	Soviet Union	Tamara Tikhonova	Anfisa Reztsova	Raisa Smetanina

=== Records in speed skating ===
All of the long track world (WR) and Olympic records (OR) that occurred during these Games were later broken at succeeding Winter Olympics and other world events.

Date	Event	NOC	Name	Time
February 14	Men's 500 metres	East Germany	Uwe-Jens Mey	36.45 (WR)
February 17	Men's 5000 metres	Sweden	Tomas Gustafson	6:44.63 (OR)
February 18	Men's 1000 metres	Soviet Union	Nikolay Gulyayev	1:13.03 (OR)
February 20	Men's 1500 metres	East Germany	André Hoffmann	1:52.06 (WR)
February 21	Men's 10000 metres	Sweden	Tomas Gustafson	13:48.20 (WR)
February 22	Women's 500 metres	United States	Bonnie Blair	39.10 (WR)
February 23	Women's 3000 metres	Netherlands	Yvonne van Gennip	4:11.94 (WR)
February 26	Women's 1000 metres	East Germany	Christa Luding-Rothenburger	1:17.65 (WR)
February 27	Women's 1500 metres	Netherlands	Yvonne van Gennip	2:00.68 (OR)
February 28	Women's 5000 metres	Netherlands	Yvonne van Gennip	7:14.13 (WR)

== Legacy ==
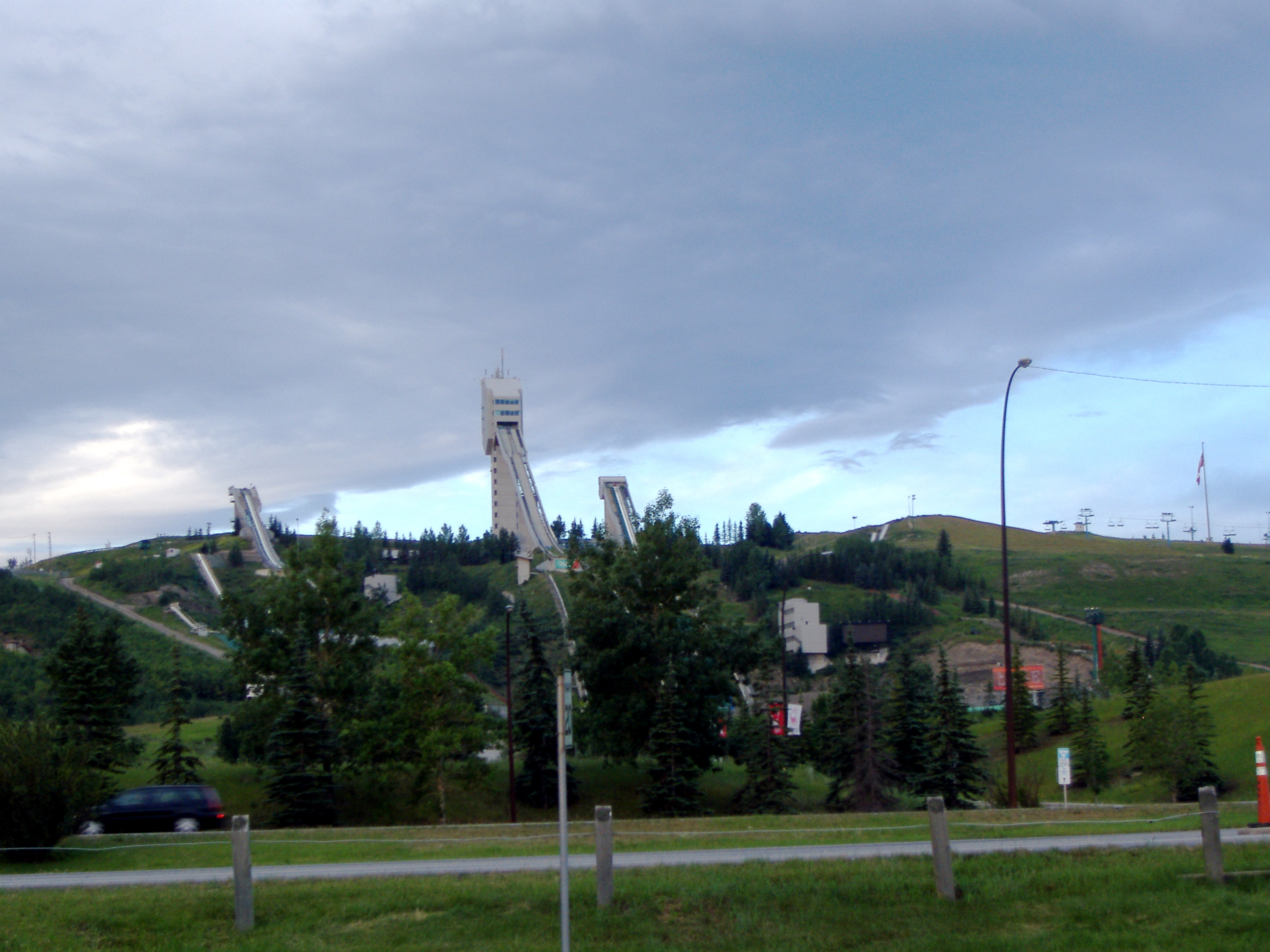
Canada Olympic Park in 2006

Prior to 1988, the Winter Olympics were viewed as a second-rate event, in comparison to the Summer Olympics. The IOC had, at one point, considered eliminating it altogether. First, there are only a few mountainous areas in the world that would be able to host the Winter Olympics. Second, there were major challenges in generating revenues for the host city and the IOC from such Games. However, CODA convinced the IOC that it could not only generate enough revenues to make a profit but have enough money left over to ensure a lasting legacy of winter sports development. OCO'88 followed mainly the example of LAOOC which organized the 1984 Summer Olympics. Under LAOOC's president, Peter Ueberroth, he was able to attract a large United States television contract and Los Angeles became the first Olympic host city to make a profit. For the 1988 Winter Olympics, OCO'88 attracted financial support from over two dozen major Canadian and multinational corporations, in order to generate millions of dollars in revenues.

For OCO'88, it foresaw some winter sports, like the debut of the Super-G and other new winter sports events, as a way to increase the audience's appeal of the Winter Olympics. Thus, for the sponsors, the Games' length of time to 15 days provided an extra weekend of Olympic media coverage to the world. This additional programming time was filled mainly by TV-friendly demonstration events that are popular in Canada. The 1988 Winter Olympics' exposure to curling, freestyle skiing, and short track speed skating events in Calgary influenced the worldwide popularity of all of them. So much so that all these events became the new and official Olympic finals in the period between the 1992 Winter Olympics to the 2002 Winter Olympics.

=== Impact on Calgary ===
Hosting the Winter Olympics helped fuel a significant increase in Calgary's reputation on the world stage. Crosbie Cotton, a reporter for the Calgary Herald who covered the city's Olympic odyssey from its 1979 initiative to the closing ceremonies, noted an increased positive outlook of the city's population over time. He believed that the populace began to outgrow its "giant inferiority complex" that is "typically Canadian", by replacing it with a new level of confidence as the Games approached. This outcome helped the city grow from a regional oil and gas centre, best known for the Calgary Stampede, to a destination for international political, economic, and sporting events. A study prepared for the organizing committee of the 2010 Winter Olympics, (VANOC), claimed that Calgary hosted over 200 national and international sporting competitions between 1987 and 2007, due to the facilities it had constructed for these Olympic Games.

The Games' enduring popularity within Calgary has been attributed to efforts in making them "everybody's Games." Aside from the sense of community fostered by the high level of volunteer support, OCO'88 included the general public in other ways. For example, the citizens were given an opportunity to purchase a brick with their names engraved on it. Those bricks were used to build the Olympic Plaza, where the medal ceremonies were held in 1988. It remains a popular public park and event site in the city's downtown core today.

After the success of these Olympic Games, Calgary was wanting to bring back the Olympic experience again. It offered, to the IOC, in becoming a possible alternate host city of the 2002 Winter Olympics, after a bidding scandal resulted in speculation that Salt Lake City would not be able to remain the host city. Next, the city was attempting to be Canada's bid for the 2010 Winter Olympics, but the COC decided to give it to Vancouver and Whistler. Later, a 2013 Calgary Sun online poll found that 81% of respondents said they would support the idea of hosting another Winter Olympics. On November 13, 2018, Calgary held a public non-binding plebiscite on whether it should bid to host the 2026 Olympic and Paralympic Winter Games. On November 19, 2018, the results of the plebiscite showed that 56.4% (171,750) of eligible voters said "No", while 43.6% (132,832) of them said "Yes." Therefore, the city council concluded that the bid would be withdrawn.

=== Canada's development as a winter sport nation ===
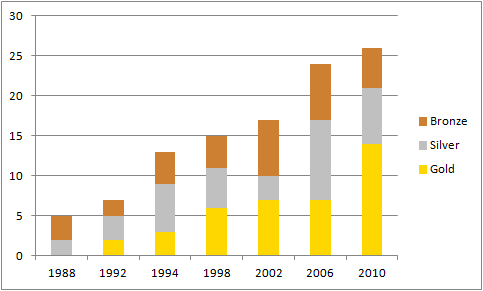
Canada increased its medal totals in each successive Winter Games from Calgary until Vancouver in 2010.

In light of the 1976 Summer Olympics' disastrous financial legacy, the Calgary Olympic organizing committee, OCO'88, parlayed its ability to generate television and sponsorship revenues, along with the three levels of government support, into what was ultimately a C$170 million surplus. While OCO'88 reported officially a surplus after the Games were over, the accounting practices of the final report did not include federal, provincial, and municipal capital and operations funding infrastructures.

The overall surplus was turned into endowment funds that were split between Canada Olympic Park (C$110 million) and CODA. They were subsequently reformed later, in order to manage the Olympic facilities with a trust fund that had grown steadily to be worth over C$200 million by 2013. Consequently, all five primary facilities built for the 1988 Winter Olympics remained operational for their intended purposes, 25 years after the Games concluded. Calgary and Canmore became the heart of winter sports in Canada, as CODA (now known as WinSport) established itself as the nation's leader in developing elite winter athletes. For the 2006 Winter Olympics, a quarter of Canada's Olympic winter athletes were from the Calgary region and three-quarters of its medalists were from or trained in Alberta.

Before 1988, Canada was not a winter sports power. The nation's five overall medals won in Calgary was its second-best total at a Winter Olympics, behind the seven overall medals it won at the 1932 Winter Olympics in Lake Placid, New York. After 1988, Canada won an increasing number of gold and overall medals at each successive Winter Olympics. It culminated in an overall performance of 26 medals won at the 2010 Winter Olympics, which included the previous Olympic record of 14 gold medals. Until 2010, Norway won the most Olympic gold medals on home soil at the 1952 Winter Olympics. However, Norway recaptured the record of winning the most Olympic gold medals at a single Winter Olympics in 2022, claiming 16. At the 2018 Winter Olympics, Canada earned its highest overall medal count in the Winter Olympics to date, with a total of 29 medals.

== See also ==
- 1988 Winter Paralympics
- 1988 Summer Paralympics
- 1988 Summer Olympics
- Olympic Games held in Canada
  - 1976 Summer Olympics – Montreal
  - 1988 Winter Olympics – Calgary
  - 2010 Winter Olympics – Vancouver
- List of IOC country codes

Winter Olympics
Preceded by Sarajevo	XV Olympic Winter Games; Calgary; 1988	Succeeded by Albertville
