= List of flag bearers for San Marino at the Olympics =

San Marino at the Olympics
- IOC code: SMR
- NOC: Comitato Olimpico Nazionale Sammarinese
- Website: www.cons.sm (in Italian)
- Medals: Gold 0 Silver 1 Bronze 2 Total 3

Summer appearances
- 1960; 1964; 1968; 1972; 1976; 1980; 1984; 1988; 1992; 1996; 2000; 2004; 2008; 2012; 2016; 2020; 2024

Winter appearances
- 1976; 1980; 1984; 1988; 1992; 1994; 1998; 2002; 2006; 2010; 2014; 2018; 2022; 2026

This is a list of flag bearers who have represented San Marino at the Olympics.

Flag bearers carry the national flag of their country at the opening ceremony of the Olympic Games.

#	Event year	Season	Flag bearer	Sport
1	1960	Summer		
2	1968	Summer	Leo Franciosi	Shooting
3	1972	Summer	Pilade Casali	Shooting (did not compete)
4	1976	Winter	Marino Guardigli	Official
5	1976	Summer	Pilade Casali	Shooting (did not compete)
6	1980	Summer	Volunteer	–
7	1984	Winter	Marino Guardigli	Official
8	1984	Summer	Maurizio Zonzini	Gymnastics
9	1988	Winter	Nicola Ercolani	Alpine skiing
10	1988	Summer	Dominique Canti	Shooting
11	1992	Winter	Andrea Sammaritani	Cross country skiing
12	1992	Summer	Sara Casadei	Swimming
13	1994	Winter	Dino Crescentini	Bobsleigh
14	1996	Summer	Manlio Molinari	Athletics
15	2000	Summer	Emanuela Felici	Shooting
16	2002	Winter	Gian Matteo Giordani	Alpine skiing
17	2004	Summer	Diego Mularoni	Swimming
18	2006	Winter	Marino Cardelli	Alpine skiing
19	2008	Summer	Daniela Del Din	Shooting
20	2010	Winter	Marino Cardelli	Alpine skiing
21	2012	Summer	Alessandra Perilli	Shooting
22	2014	Winter	Vincenzo Michelotti	Alpine skiing
23	2016	Summer	Arianna Perilli	Shooting
24	2018	Winter	Alessandro Mariotti	Alpine skiing
25	2020	Summer	Myles Amine	Wrestling
25	2020	Summer	Arianna Valloni	Swimming
26	2022	Winter	Matteo Gatti	Alpine skiing
26	2022	Winter	Anna Torsani	Alpine skiing
27	2024	Summer	Loris Bianchi	Swimming
27	2024	Summer	Alessandra Gasparelli	Athletics

== See also ==
- San Marino at the Olympics
