= San Marino at the 1992 Summer Olympics =

- IOC code: SMR
- NOC: Sammarinese National Olympic Committee
- Website: www.cons.sm (in Italian)

in Barcelona
- Competitors: 17 (16 men, 1 woman) in 7 sports
- Flag bearer: Sara Casadei
- Medals: Gold 0 Silver 0 Bronze 0 Total 0

Summer Olympics appearances (overview)
- 1960; 1964; 1968; 1972; 1976; 1980; 1984; 1988; 1992; 1996; 2000; 2004; 2008; 2012; 2016; 2020; 2024

San Marino competed at the 1992 Summer Olympics in Barcelona, Spain. Seventeen competitors, sixteen men and one woman, took part in fifteen events in seven sports.

== Competitors ==
The following is the list of number of competitors in the Games.

Sport	Men	Women	Total
Archery	1	0	1
Athletics	5	0	5
Cycling	1	0	1
Judo	1	0	1
Shooting	2	0	2
Swimming	4	1	5
Tennis	2	0	2
Total	16	1	17

== Archery ==
In its debut Olympic archery competition, San Marino was represented by one man. He did not advance to the elimination rounds.

Athlete	Event	Ranking round		Round of 32	Round of 16	Quarterfinals	Semifinals	Final / BM		
Athlete	Event	Score	Seed	Opposition Score	Opposition Score	Opposition Score	Opposition Score	Opposition Score	Opposition Score	Rank
Paolo Tura	Men's Individual	1130	N/A	did not advance						

== Athletics ==
Men's 100m metres

- Dominique Canti

- Heat – 11.14 (→ did not advance)

Men's 4 × 100 m metres Relay

- Nicola Selva, Manlio Molinari, Dominique Canti, and Aldo Canti

- Heat – 42.08 (→ did not advance)

Men's Marathon

- Gian Luigi Macina

- Final – 2:30.45 (66)

== Cycling ==
One male cyclist represented San Marino in 1992.

Men's road race

- Guido Frisoni

== Swimming ==
Men's 50m Freestyle

- Filippo Piva
  1. Heat – 26.41 (→ did not advance, 66th place)
- Roberto Pellandra
  1. Heat – 26.51 (→ did not advance, 67th place)

Men's 200m Freestyle

- Daniele Casadei
  1. Heat – 2:06.14 (→ did not advance, 52nd place)

Men's 100m Breaststroke

- Danilo Zavoli
  1. Heat – 1:09.65 (→ did not advance, 50th place)

Men's 200m Breaststroke

- Danilo Zavoli
  1. Heat – 2:34.87 (→ did not advance, 47th place)

Women's 50m Freestyle

- Sara Casadei
  1. Heat – 30.05 (→ did not advance, 49th place)

== Tennis ==
Men's Doubles Competition

- Christian Forcellini and Gabriel Francini
  1. First round – Lost to Anastasios Bavelas and Konstantinos Efraimoglou (Greece) 1–6, 1–6, 2-6
