= San Marino at the Olympics =

- IOC code: SMR
- NOC: Sammarinese National Olympic Committee
- Website: www.cons.sm (in Italian)
- Medals Ranked 131st: Gold 0 Silver 1 Bronze 2 Total 3

Summer appearances
- 1960; 1964; 1968; 1972; 1976; 1980; 1984; 1988; 1992; 1996; 2000; 2004; 2008; 2012; 2016; 2020; 2024; 2028

Winter appearances
- 1976; 1980; 1984; 1988; 1992; 1994; 1998; 2002; 2006; 2010; 2014; 2018; 2022; 2026

San Marino, following its debut at the 1960 Summer Olympics, has competed in 16 Summer Olympic Games and in 12 Winter Olympic Games.

San Marino has won three medals at the Olympics, two in shooting and one in wrestling, with all three thus far coming at Tokyo 2020. Its most successful athlete is Alessandra Perilli, who, having finished 4th in the Women's Trap final at London 2012, went on to win two medals at Tokyo 2020, first a bronze in the Women's Trap and two days later, silver with Gian Marco Berti in the Mixed Trap Team final.

With a population of 33,600, San Marino is, as of Paris 2024, the smallest country by population to have won an Olympic medal, narrowly edging out previous smallest nations Bermuda (Summer Olympics) and Liechtenstein (Winter Olympics).

== Medal tables ==
=== Medals by Summer Games ===
Games	Athletes	Gold	Silver	Bronze	Total	Rank
1960 Rome	9	0	0	0	0	–
1964 Tokyo	did not participate					
1968 Mexico City	4	0	0	0	0	–
1972 Munich	7	0	0	0	0	–
1976 Montreal	10	0	0	0	0	–
1980 Moscow	16	0	0	0	0	–
1984 Los Angeles	19	0	0	0	0	–
1988 Seoul	12	0	0	0	0	–
1992 Barcelona	15	0	0	0	0	–
1996 Atlanta	7	0	0	0	0	–
2000 Sydney	4	0	0	0	0	–
2004 Athens	5	0	0	0	0	–
2008 Beijing	4	0	0	0	0	–
2012 London	4	0	0	0	0	–
2016 Rio de Janeiro	4	0	0	0	0	–
2020 Tokyo	5	0	1	2	3	72
2024 Paris	5	0	0	0	0	–
2028 Los Angeles	future event					
2032 Brisbane	future event					
Total		0	1	2	3	131

=== Medals by Winter Games ===
Games	Athletes	Gold	Silver	Bronze	Total	Rank
1976 Innsbruck	2	0	0	0	0	–
1980 Lake Placid	did not participate					
1984 Sarajevo	3	0	0	0	0	–
1988 Calgary	5	0	0	0	0	–
1992 Albertville	3	0	0	0	0	–
1994 Lillehammer	3	0	0	0	0	–
1998 Nagano	did not participate					
2002 Salt Lake City	1	0	0	0	0	–
2006 Turin	1	0	0	0	0	–
2010 Vancouver	1	0	0	0	0	–
2014 Sochi	2	0	0	0	0	–
2018 Pyeongchang	1	0	0	0	0	–
2022 Beijing	2	0	0	0	0	–
2026 Milano Cortina	1	0	0	0	0	–
2030 French Alps	future event					
2034 Utah	future event					
Total		0	0	0	0	–

=== Medals by summer sport ===
Sport	Gold	Silver	Bronze	Total
Shooting	0	1	1	2
Wrestling	0	0	1	1
Totals (2 entries)	0	1	2	3

== List of Medalists ==
Medal	Name	Games	Sport	Event
Silver	Alessandra Perilli; Gian Marco Berti	2020 Tokyo	Shooting	Mixed trap team
Bronze	Alessandra Perilli	2020 Tokyo	Shooting	Women's trap
Bronze	Myles Amine	2020 Tokyo	Wrestling	Men’s freestyle 86 kg

== Olympic participants ==
=== Summer Olympics ===
Sport	1960	1968	1972	1976	1980	1984	1988	1992	1996	2000	2004	2008	2012	2016	2020	Athletes
Archery								1	1				1			2
Athletics				2	1	2	2	5	1	1	1	1	1	1		12
Cycling	4	2	1	1	2	1		1								10
Gymnastics						1										1
Judo					2	2	3	1	1						1	5
Sailing						1	1		1							3
Shooting	4	2	6	7	10	10	2	2	2	2	2	1	1	3	2	31
Swimming						2	2	5	1	1	2	2	1		1	12
Tennis								2								2
Weightlifting					1		1									2
Wrestling	1														1	2

=== Winter Olympics ===
Sport	1976	1984	1988	1992	1994	2002	2006	2010	2014	2018	2022	2026	Athletes
Alpine Skiing	2	2	4	2	1	1	1	1	2	1	2	1	16
Bobsleigh					2								2
Cross Country Skiing		1	1	1									1

== See also ==
- List of flag bearers for San Marino at the Olympics
- San Marino at the Paralympics
