= San Marino at the 1972 Summer Olympics =

- IOC code: SMR
- NOC: Sammarinese National Olympic Committee

in Munich
- Competitors: 7 in 2 sports
- Flag bearer: Pilade Casali
- Medals: Gold 0 Silver 0 Bronze 0 Total 0

Summer Olympics appearances (overview)
- 1960; 1964; 1968; 1972; 1976; 1980; 1984; 1988; 1992; 1996; 2000; 2004; 2008; 2012; 2016; 2020; 2024

San Marino competed at the 1972 Summer Olympics in Munich, West Germany. Seven competitors, all men, took part in four events in two sports.

== Cycling ==
One cyclist represented San Marino in 1972.

Individual road race

- Daniele Cesaretti – did not finish (→ no ranking)

== Shooting ==
Six shooters represented San Marino in 1972.

25 m pistol

- Bruno Morri – 570pts (47th place).
- Roberto Tamagnini – Withdrew.

50 m rifle, three positions

- Italo Casali – 1026pts (65th place).
- Libero Casali – 997pts (68th place).

Trap

- Silvano Raganini – 186pts (24th place).
- Guglielmo Giusti – 175pts (43rd place).
