= San Marino at the 1988 Summer Olympics =

- IOC code: SMR
- NOC: Sammarinese National Olympic Committee

in Seoul
- Competitors: 11 in 6 sports
- Flag bearer: Dominique Canti
- Medals: Gold 0 Silver 0 Bronze 0 Total 0

Summer Olympics appearances (overview)
- 1960; 1964; 1968; 1972; 1976; 1980; 1984; 1988; 1992; 1996; 2000; 2004; 2008; 2012; 2016; 2020; 2024

San Marino competed at the 1988 Summer Olympics in Seoul, South Korea.

== Competitors ==
The following is the list of number of competitors in the Games.

Sport	Men	Women	Total
Athletics	2	0	2
Judo	3	–	3
Sailing	1	0	1
Shooting	2	0	2
Swimming	2	0	2
Weightlifting	1	–	1
Total	11	0	11

== Results by event ==
=== Swimming ===
Men's 50m Freestyle

- Michele Piva
  1. Heat – 26.60 (→ did not advance, 63rd place)
- Filippo Piva
  1. Heat – 26.96 (→ did not advance, 66th place)

Men's 100m Freestyle

- Michele Piva
  1. Heat – 57.99 (→ did not advance, 69th place)
- Filippo Piva
  1. Heat – 58.39 (→ did not advance, 71st place)

Men's 100m Backstroke

- Filippo Piva
  1. Heat – 1:07.63 (→ did not advance, 48th place)

Men's 100m Breaststroke

- Michele Piva
  1. Heat – 1:13.94 (→ did not advance, 56th place)
