= San Marino at the 1960 Summer Olympics =

- IOC code: SMR (SMA used at these Games)
- NOC: Sammarinese National Olympic Committee

in Rome
- Competitors: 10 in 4 sports
- Medals: Gold 0 Silver 0 Bronze 0 Total 0

Summer Olympics appearances (overview)
- 1960; 1964; 1968; 1972; 1976; 1980; 1984; 1988; 1992; 1996; 2000; 2004; 2008; 2012; 2016; 2020; 2024

San Marino competed in the Summer Olympic Games for the first time at the 1960 Summer Olympics in Rome, Italy. Ten competitors, nine men and one woman, took part in six events in four sports.

== Cycling ==
Four male cyclists represented San Marino in 1960.

Individual road race

- Salvatore Palmucci
- Domenico Cecchetti
- Sante Ciacci
- Vito Corbelli

Team time trial

- Salvatore Palmucci
- Sante Ciacci
- Domenico Cecchetti
- Vito Corbelli

== Shooting ==
Four shooters represented San Marino in 1960.

50 m pistol

- Aroldo Casali
- Spartaco Cesaretti

Trap

- Leo Franciosi
- Guglielmo Giusti

== Wrestling ==
- Vittorio Mancini – 16th place, men's freestyle bantamweight

== Gymnastics ==
- Fernanda Faetanini (did not participate in any events)
