= San Marino at the 2020 Summer Olympics =

- IOC code: SMR
- NOC: Sammarinese National Olympic Committee
- Website: www.cons.sm (in Italian)

in Tokyo, Japan 23 July 2021 – 8 August 2021
- Competitors: 5 in 4 sports
- Flag bearers (opening): Arianna Valloni; Myles Amine
- Flag bearer (closing): Myles Amine
- Medals Ranked 72nd: Gold 0 Silver 1 Bronze 2 Total 3

Summer Olympics appearances (overview)
- 1960; 1964; 1968; 1972; 1976; 1980; 1984; 1988; 1992; 1996; 2000; 2004; 2008; 2012; 2016; 2020; 2024

San Marino participated at the 2020 Summer Olympics in Tokyo, Japan, held between 23 July and 8 August 2021. It was originally scheduled to take place from 24 July to 9 August 2020, but was postponed because of the COVID-19 pandemic. The country's participation in the Games marked its fifteenth appearance at the Summer Olympics since its debut in the 1960 Games.

The San Marino team consisted of five athletes who competed across four sports. Swimmer Arianna Valloni and wrestler Myles Amine served as the country's flag-bearer during the parade of nations in the opening ceremony, and Amine served as the flag-bearer during the closing ceremony.

San Marino had not won a Summer Olympics medal before the Games. The nation's first Olympic medal, a bronze medal, was won by female trap shooter Alessandra Perilli. With this San Marino became the smallest country, by population, ever to have won any Olympic medal. Two days later, on 31 July, Perilli and Gian Marco Berti won the country's second medal, a silver in the mixed trap shooting event. San Marino then took home its third medal on 5 August, with Amine winning a bronze in the 86 kg freestyle wrestling event. San Marino was ranked 72nd in the medal table, and with five competitors, the nation had the most overall medals per population.

== Background ==
The National Olympic Committee of San Marino was formed on 16 April 1959. The Comitato Olimpico Nazionale Sammarinese was recognized by the International Olympic Committee (IOC) on 25 May of the same year. San Marino first participated in Olympic competition at the 1960 Summer Olympics, and have participated in most Olympic Games ever since. After the nation made its debut in the 1960 Games, this edition of the Games in 2020 marked the nation's fifteenth appearance at the Summer Games.

The 1988 Winter Olympics was held in Tokyo, Japan, held between 23 July and 8 August 2021. It was originally scheduled to take place from 24 July to 9 August 2020, but was postponed because of the COVID-19 pandemic. The San Marino team consisted of five athletes who competed across four sports. Swimmer Arianna Valloni and wrestler Myles Amine served as the country's flag-bearer during the parade of nations in the opening ceremony, and Amine served as the flag-bearer during the closing ceremony. San Marino had not won a Summer Olympics medal previously.

== Medalists ==
On 29 July, Alessandra Perilli won a bronze medal in the women's trap shooting. This was the nation's first ever Olympic medal, and with this San Marino became the smallest country, by population, ever to have won any Olympic medal. Two days later, on 31 July, Perilli and Gian Marco Berti won the country's second medal, a silver in the mixed trap shooting event. San Marino then took home its third medal on 5 August, with Amine winning a bronze in the 86 kg freestyle wrestling event. San Marino was ranked 72nd in the medal table, and with five competitors, the nation had the most overall medals per population. With five competitors in four sports, San Marino won the most overall medals per population.

Medal	Name	Sport	Event	Date
Silver	Gian Marco Berti; Alessandra Perilli	Shooting	Mixed trap	31 July
Bronze	Alessandra Perilli	Shooting	Women's trap	29 July
Bronze	Myles Amine	Wrestling	Men's freestyle 86 kg	5 August

== Competitors ==
San Marino sent five athletes who competed in four sports at the Games.

Sport	Men	Women	Total
Judo	1	0	1
Shooting	1	1	2
Swimming	0	1	1
Wrestling	1	0	1
Total	3	2	5

== Judo ==
San Marino received an invitation from the tripartite commission and the International Judo Federation to send a single participant to the Games. Paolo Persoglia participated in the men's middleweight category (90 kg) in the Olympics, marking the nation's return to the sport for the first time since Atlanta 1996. However, Persoglia lost in the first round to Noël van 't End of Netherlands.

Athlete	Event	Round of 64	Round of 32	Round of 16	Quarterfinals	Semifinals	Repechage	Final / BM	
Athlete	Event	Opposition Result	Opposition Result	Opposition Result	Opposition Result	Opposition Result	Opposition Result	Opposition Result	Rank
Paolo Persoglia	Men's −90 kg	Bye	van 't End (NED); L 00–10	Did not advance					

== Shooting ==
As per the International Shooting Sport Federation (ISSF) guidelines, quota places for the Games were allocated to the NOCs based on the results at designated ISSF supervised events held from 1 September 2018 to 6 June 2021. Four quota places in individual events were awarded to the shooters who competed in the respective mixed team events (rifle, pistol, and trap). Initial quota places were allocated only to the NOCs, who were then allowed to choose the individual shooters. After the initial quotas were allocated, shooters were granted entries based on the ISSF world rankings, which were awarded directly to the individual shooters and were not permitted to be changed by the NOCs.

Sammarinese shooters achieved three quota places in trap events for the shooting events based on the results at the 2018 ISSF World Shooting Championships, the 2019 ISSF World Cup series, European Championships or Games, and European Qualifying tournaments.

On 29 July, Alessandra Perilli won bronze in the women's trap shooting. Six shooters qualified for the final and, after the first 25 target shots, the lowest shooter was eliminated. After another 10 shots, only four shooters remained and both Perilli and Laetisha Scanlan had 26 hits. Perilli went through by virtue of her higher placement in the qualification round. Perilli was eliminated next, but finishing third made her the first ever Olympic medallist from San Marino. Perilli had already finished fourth in the same event and missed out on a medal in a shoot-off during the 2012 Summer Olympics in London.

On 31 July, Perilli teamed up with Gian Marco Berti for the Mixed trap team event. In the qualification rounds, the team shot 148 out of 150 shots to be ranked second. By virtue of the second place finish, the team qualified for the gold medal face-off against Fátima Gálvez and Alberto Fernández of Spain. In the final, the team lost by a single shot, and settled for the silver medal. This was San Marino's first ever silver medal at the Olympics.

Athlete	Event	Qualification		Final	
Athlete	Event	Points	Rank	Points	Rank
Gian Marco Berti	Men's trap	121	18	Did not advance	
Alessandra Perilli	Women's trap	122	2 Q	29	3rd place, bronze medalist(s)
Gian Marco Berti; Alessandra Perilli	Mixed trap team	148	2 Q	40	2nd place, silver medalist(s)

== Swimming ==
As per the Fédération internationale de natation (FINA) guidelines, a NOC was permitted to enter a maximum of two qualified athletes in each individual event, who have achieved the Olympic Qualifying Time (OQT). If the quota was not filled, one athlete per event was allowed to enter, provided they achieved the Olympic Selection Time (OST). The qualifying time standards should have been achieved in competitions approved by World Aquatics in the period between 1 March 2019 to 27 June 2021. FINA also allowed NOCs to enter swimmers (one per gender) under a universality place even if they have not achieved the standard entry times (OQT/OST). San Marino was awarded two universality quota places in swimming, and Arianna Valloni represented the nation in the women's freestyle events.

The swimming events were held at the Tokyo Aquatics Centre. Valloni finished 29th and 32nd in the heats for the women's 800 m and 1500 m freestyle events, and failed to qualify for the next round.

Athlete	Event	Heat		Final	
Athlete	Event	Time	Rank	Time	Rank
Arianna Valloni	Women's 800 m freestyle	8:54.78	29	Did not advance	
Arianna Valloni	Women's 1500 m freestyle	16:54.64	32	Did not advance	

== Wrestling ==
As per the United World Wrestling, each NOC was allowed to enter a maximum of 18 wrestlers with one per event. Quotas were allocated at the 2019 World Wrestling Championships, continental tournaments (2021 Asian Wrestling Olympic Qualification Tournament for Asia) and 2021 World Wrestling Olympic Qualification Tournament. For the first time since Rome 1960, San Marino qualified one wrestler for the competitions. Myles Amine participated in the men's freestyle 86 kg competition, as a result of his top six finish at the 2019 World Championships.

The wrestling events took place between 1 and 7 August at the Makuhari Messe in Mihama-ku. In the men's 86 kg category, Amine secured a first round victory over Carlos Izquierdo of Colombia by points score. He lost to David Taylor of the United States in the quarterfinals. In the repechage rounds, he beat Ali Shabanau of Belarus and Deepak Punia of India in successive matches to win the bronze medal.

Key:

- VT (ranking points: 5–0 or 0–5) – Victory by fall.
- VB (ranking points: 5–0 or 0–5) – Victory by injury (VF for forfeit, VA for withdrawal or disqualification)
- PP (ranking points: 3–1 or 1–3) – Decision by points – the loser with technical points.
- PO (ranking points: 3–0 or 0–3) – Decision by points – the loser without technical points.
- ST (ranking points: 4–0 or 0–4) – Great superiority – the loser without technical points and a margin of victory of at least 8 (Greco-Roman) or 10 (freestyle) points.
- SP (ranking points: 4–1 or 1–4) – Technical superiority – the loser with technical points and a margin of victory of at least 8 (Greco-Roman) or 10 (freestyle) points.

Freestyle

Athlete	Event	Round of 16	Quarterfinal	Semifinal	Repechage	Final / BM	
Athlete	Event	Opposition Result	Opposition Result	Opposition Result	Opposition Result	Opposition Result	Rank
Myles Amine	Men's −86 kg	Izquierdo (COL); W 4–1 ^{SP}	Taylor (USA); L 1–4 ^{SP}	Did not advance	Shabanau (BLR); W 3–0 ^{PO}	Punia (IND); W 3–1 ^{PP}	3rd place, bronze medalist(s)
