= San Marino at the 1996 Summer Olympics =

- IOC code: SMR
- NOC: Sammarinese National Olympic Committee
- Website: www.cons.sm (in Italian)

in Atlanta
- Competitors: 7 in 6 sports
- Flag bearer: Manlio Molinari
- Medals: Gold 0 Silver 0 Bronze 0 Total 0

Summer Olympics appearances (overview)
- 1960; 1964; 1968; 1972; 1976; 1980; 1984; 1988; 1992; 1996; 2000; 2004; 2008; 2012; 2016; 2020; 2024

San Marino competed at the 1996 Summer Olympics in Atlanta, United States.

== Archery ==
In its second Olympic archery competition, San Marino was represented by one man. He lost his first match.

Men's Individual Competition:

- Paolo Tura – Round of 64 (→ 62nd place), 0-1

== Athletics ==
Men
Track & road events

Athlete	Event	Heat		Semifinal		Final	
Athlete	Event	Result	Rank	Result	Rank	Result	Rank
Manlio Molinari	800m	1:56.08	52nd	did not qualify			

== Judo ==
- Loris Mularoni

== Sailing ==
- Luca Belluzzi

== Shooting ==
- Francesco Amici
- Nadia Marchi

== Swimming ==
- Diego Mularoni
