= San Marino at the 2000 Summer Olympics =

- IOC code: SMR
- NOC: Sammarinese National Olympic Committee
- Website: www.cons.sm (in Italian)

in Sydney
- Competitors: 4 in 3 sports
- Flag bearer: Emanuela Felici
- Medals: Gold 0 Silver 0 Bronze 0 Total 0

Summer Olympics appearances (overview)
- 1960; 1964; 1968; 1972; 1976; 1980; 1984; 1988; 1992; 1996; 2000; 2004; 2008; 2012; 2016; 2020; 2024

San Marino was represented at the 2000 Summer Olympics in Sydney, New South Wales, Australia by the Sammarinese National Olympic Committee.

In total, four athletes including three men and one woman represented San Marino in three different sports including athletics, shooting and swimming.

== Background ==
San Marino made their Olympic debut at the 1960 Summer Olympics in Rome, Italy. The 2000 Summer Olympics in Sydney, New South Wales, Australia marked their 10th appearance at the Summer Olympics. The delegation of four athletes was one of the smallest sent to a Summer Olympics, only the delegation sent to the 1992 Summer Olympics in Barcelona, Spain was smaller.

== Competitors ==
In total, four athletes represented San Marino at the 2000 Summer Olympics in Sydney, New South Wales, Australia across three different sports.

Sport	Men	Women	Total
Athletics	1	0	1
Shooting	1	1	2
Swimming	1	0	1
Total	3	1	4

== Athletics ==
In total, one Sammarinese athlete participated in the athletics events – Gian Luigi Macina in the men's marathon.

The athletics events took place at the Sydney Olympic Stadium in Sydney Olympic Park, Sydney from 22 September – 1 October 2000.

Athletes	Events	Final	
Athletes	Events	Time	Rank
Gian Luigi Macina	Marathon	2:35:42	74

== Shooting ==
In total, two Sammarinese athletes participated in the shooting events – Francesco Amici in the men's trap and Emanuela Felici in the women's trap.

The shooting events took place at the Sydney International Shooting Centre in Cecil Park, New South Wales from 16–22 September 2000.

Men

Athlete	Event	Qualification		Final	
Athlete	Event	Score	Rank	Score	Rank
Francesco Amici	Trap	106	32nd	did not advance	

Women

Athlete	Event	Qualification		Final	
Athlete	Event	Score	Rank	Score	Rank
Emanuela Felici	Trap	64	7th	did not advance	

== Swimming ==
In total, one Sammarinese athlete participated in the swimming events – Diego Mularoni in the men's 1,500 m freestyle.

The swimming events took place at the Sydney Olympic Park Aquatic Centre in Sydney Olympic Park, Sydney from 16–23 September 2000.

Athlete	Event	Heat		Semifinal		Final	
Athlete	Event	Time	Rank	Time	Rank	Time	Rank
Diego Mularoni	1,500 m freestyle	16:12.91	39	Did not advance			
