= San Marino at the 2024 Summer Olympics =

- IOC code: SMR
- NOC: Sammarinese National Olympic Committee
- Website: www.cons.sm (in Italian)

in Paris, France 26 July 2024 – 11 August 2024
- Competitors: 5 (2 men and 3 women) in 5 sports
- Flag bearers (opening): Loris Bianchi; Alessandra Gasparelli
- Flag bearers (closing): Myles Amine; Giorgia Cesarini
- Medals: Gold 0 Silver 0 Bronze 0 Total 0

Summer Olympics appearances (overview)
- 1960; 1964; 1968; 1972; 1976; 1980; 1984; 1988; 1992; 1996; 2000; 2004; 2008; 2012; 2016; 2020; 2024

San Marino participated at the 2024 Summer Olympics in Paris from 26 July to 11 August 2024. The country's participation in the Games marked its sixteenth appearance at the Summer Olympics since its debut in the 1960 Games.

The San Marino team consisted of five athletes who competed across five sports. Alessandra Gasparelli and Loris Bianchi served as the country's flag-bearers during the parade of nations in the opening ceremony. Myles Amine and Giorgia Cesarini served as the flag-bearers during the closing ceremony.

== Background ==
The National Olympic Committee of San Marino was formed on 16 April 1959. The Comitato Olimpico Nazionale Sammarinese was recognized by the International Olympic Committee (IOC) on 25 May of the same year. San Marino first participated in Olympic competition at the 1960 Summer Olympics, and have participated in most Olympic Games ever since. After the nation made its debut in the 1960 Games, this edition of the Games in 2024 marked the nation's sixteenth appearance at the Summer Games.

The 2024 Summer Olympics was held in Paris from 26 July to 11 August 2024. The San Marino team consisted of five athletes who competed across five sports. Alessandra Gasparelli and Loris Bianchi served as the country's flag-bearers during the parade of nations in the opening ceremony. Myles Amine and Giorgia Cesarini served as the flag-bearers during the closing ceremony. San Marino had not won a Summer Olympics medal before the 2020 Games. In the previous event at Tokyo, the nation won three medals including a silver and a bronze. However, the nation did not win a medal during the 2024 Summer Olympics.

== Competitors ==
San Marino sent five athletes including two men and three women who competed in five sports at the Games.

Sport	Men	Women	Total
Archery	0	1	1
Athletics	0	1	1
Shooting	0	1	1
Swimming	1	0	1
Wrestling	1	0	1
Total	2	3	5

== Archery ==
As per the qualification system drawn up by the World Archery Federation, each National Olympic Committee (NOC) was permitted to enter a maximum of six competitors, three per gender. NOCs that qualify teams for a particular gender are able to send a three-member team to the team event and also have each member compete in the individual event with the remaining spots filled by individual qualification tournaments. The qualification for the team event was determined by various qualification tournaments and world archery rankings. San Marino was allocated a universality place by the World Archery Federation for the women's individual event. Giorgia Cesarini made her Olympics debut at the Games.

The ranking rounds for the archery events were held at the Les Invalides on 25 July. Cesarini was raked 58th amongst the 64 participants with a score of 625 points. In the main event, Cesarini was eliminated in the first round by Michelle Kroppen of Germany.

Athlete	Event	Ranking round		Round of 64	Round of 32	Round of 16	Quarterfinals	Semifinals	Final / BM	
Athlete	Event	Score	Seed	Opposition Score	Opposition Score	Opposition Score	Opposition Score	Opposition Score	Opposition Score	Rank
Giorgia Cesarini	Women's individual	625	58	Kroppen (GER); L 3–7	Did not advance					33

== Athletics ==
As per the governing body World Athletics (WA), a NOC was allowed to enter up to three qualified athletes in each individual event and one qualified relay team if the Olympic Qualifying Standards (OQS) had been met during the qualifying period at the events approved by WA. The remaining places are allocated based on the World Athletics Rankings which were derived from the average of the best five results for an athlete over the designated qualifying period and the universality places were allocated later at the discretion of WA. San Marino received a universality slot to send one sprinter to the women's 100 m event in the Olympics.

In the main event held on 2 August at Stade de France, Alessandra Gasparelli made it through to the main heats after finishing second in the preliminary rounds. In the heats, she set a new national record with a time of 11.54 seconds. However, she finished in seventh place out of the eight sprinters, and was eliminated from further competition.

Key

- Note–Ranks given for track events are within the athlete's heat only
- Q = Qualified for the next round
- q = Qualified for the next round as a fastest loser or, in field events, by position without achieving the qualifying target
- NR = National record
- N/A = Round not applicable for the event
- Bye = Athlete not required to compete in round

Track events

Athlete	Event	Preliminary		Heat		Semifinal		Final	
Athlete	Event	Result	Rank	Result	Rank	Result	Rank	Result	Rank
Alessandra Gasparelli	Women's 100 m	11.62	2 Q	11.54 NR	7	Did not advance			

== Shooting ==
As per the International Shooting Sport Federation (ISSF) guidelines, quota places for the Games were allocated to the NOCs based on the results at designated ISSF supervised events held from 14 August 2022 to 9 June 2024. Initial quota places were allocated only to the NOCs, who were allowed to choose the individual shooters. After the initial quotas were allocated, shooters were granted entries based on the ISSF world rankings, which were awarded directly to the individual shooters and were not to be changed by the NOCs. San Marino achieved one quota place for the shooting event.

Alessandra Perilli represented the nation in the women's trap event. She won a silver and bronze, including the country's first ever Olympic medal, in the previous Olympics. The main event that took place on 30 and 31 July 2024 at the Chateauroux Shooting Centre. Perilli scored 116 hits out of a possible 125 and was ranked 15th in the qualification. As only the top six advanced to the final, she did not qualify for the final.

Athlete	Event	Qualification		Final	
Athlete	Event	Points	Rank	Points	Rank
Alessandra Perilli	Women's trap	116	15	Did not advance	

== Swimming ==
As per the World Aquatics guidelines, a NOC was permitted to enter a maximum of two qualified athletes in each individual event, who have achieved the Olympic Qualifying Time. One athlete per event will be allowed to enter if they meet the Olympic Selection Time if the quota is not filled. NOCs were allowed to enter swimmers (one per gender) under a universality place even if no one achieved the standard entry times. San Marino was awarded one universality quota place in swimming. Loris Bianchi qualified for the men's 400 m freestyle event.

The swimming events were held at the Paris La Défense Arena. In the men's 400m freestyle, Bianchi finished 32nd out of the 37 competitors with a time of 4:01.13 and failed to qualify for the next round.

Athlete	Event	Heat		Semifinal		Final	
Athlete	Event	Time	Rank	Time	Rank	Time	Rank
Loris Bianchi	Men's 400 m freestyle	4:01.13	32	Did not advance			

Qualifiers for the later rounds (Q) of all events were determined based solely on time. Therefore, the positions shown represent overall results compared to competitors across all heats.

== Wrestling ==
As per the United World Wrestling, each NOC was allowed to enter a maximum of 18 wrestlers with one per event. Quotas were allocated at the 2023 World Wrestling Championships, continental tournaments and 2024 World Wrestling Olympic Qualification Tournament. Myles Amine earned his spot at the Games with a top-five finish at the 2023 World Championships held in Belgrade, Serbia.

This was the second Olympic appearance for Amine, who was a bronze medalist from the previous Olympic Games. The men's −86 kg category events that took place on 8–9 August 2024 at the Grand Palais Éphémère in Champ de Mars. A typical wrestling bout consisted of two halves of three minutes each separated by a 30-second break. The two competitors compete on a mat, which is nine meters in diameter and try to score points by executing various legal maneuvers. Forcing an opponent's shoulders to the mat results in an instant victory by fall.

Amine beat Vasyl Mykhailov of Ukraine and Osman Nurmagomedov of Azerbaijan in the first two rounds by points scores to advance to the semifinals. He lost the semifinal bout to Hassan Yazdani of Iran. In the bronze medal bout, he lost to Dauren Kurugliev of Greece by a single point, and missed out on a chance to win medals at consecutive Olympic Games.

Key:

- VT (ranking points: 5–0 or 0–5) – Victory by fall.
- VB (ranking points: 5–0 or 0–5) – Victory by injury (VF for forfeit, VA for withdrawal or disqualification)
- PP (ranking points: 3–1 or 1–3) – Decision by points – the loser with technical points.
- PO (ranking points: 3–0 or 0–3) – Decision by points – the loser without technical points.
- ST (ranking points: 4–0 or 0–4) – Great superiority – the loser without technical points and a margin of victory of at least 8 (Greco-Roman) or 10 (freestyle) points.
- SP (ranking points: 4–1 or 1–4) – Technical superiority – the loser with technical points and a margin of victory of at least 8 (Greco-Roman) or 10 (freestyle) points.

Freestyle

Athlete	Event	Round of 16	Quarterfinal	Semifinal	Repechage	Final / BM	
Athlete	Event	Opposition Result	Opposition Result	Opposition Result	Opposition Result	Opposition Result	Rank
Myles Amine	Men's −86 kg	Mykhailov (UKR); W 7–4	Nurmagomedov (AZE); W 16–14	Yazdani (IRI); L 1–7	Bye	Kurugliev (GRE); L 4–5	=5

== See also ==
- San Marino at the Olympics
- San Marino at the 2024 Winter Youth Olympics
