= San Marino at the 2012 Summer Olympics =

- IOC code: SMR
- NOC: Sammarinese National Olympic Committee
- Website: www.cons.sm (in Italian)

in London
- Competitors: 4 in 4 sports
- Flag bearer: Alessandra Perilli
- Medals: Gold 0 Silver 0 Bronze 0 Total 0

Summer Olympics appearances (overview)
- 1960; 1964; 1968; 1972; 1976; 1980; 1984; 1988; 1992; 1996; 2000; 2004; 2008; 2012; 2016; 2020; 2024

San Marino competed at the 2012 Summer Olympics in London, which was held from 27 July to 12 August 2012. The country's participation at London marked its thirteenth appearance in the Summer Olympics since its début at the 1960 Summer Olympics. The delegation sent by the Sammarinese National Olympic Committee consisted of four athletes: sprinter Martina Pretelli, archer Emanuele Guidi, trap shooter Alessandra Perilli and short-distance swimmer Clelia Tini.

Three of the four Sammarinese athletes qualified for the Games by using wild cards for their respective events, bar Perilli who made the Olympics by meeting the required criteria for her sport. Although Pretelli, Guidi and Tini were unable to advance beyond the heats of their contests, Perilli came joint second in the final of the women's trap shooting event. Perilli narrowly missed out on claiming San Marino's first Olympic medal after placing fourth following a shoot-out for the bronze and silver medals.

== Background ==
San Marino first entered Olympic competition at the 1960 Summer Olympics in Rome. Excepting the 1964 Tokyo Summer Olympics, they have participated in every edition of the Summer Olympic Games since, making London the nation's thirteenth appearance in the quadrennial event. No athlete who has represented San Marino has ever won a medal at the Olympic Games. The London Summer Games were held from 27 July to 12 August 2012. The Sammarinesi delegation consisted of four athletes, archer Emanuele Guidi, sprinter Martina Pretelli, trap shooter Alessandra Perilli and short-distance swimmer Clelia Tini. They were accompanied by a press officer and five officials, including the San Marino State Secretary for Sport, Fabio Berardi, and the president of the Sammarinese National Olympic Committee, Angelo Vicini. The delegation flew to London on 24 July. Perilli was selected as the flag bearer for the opening and closing ceremonies.

== Archery ==
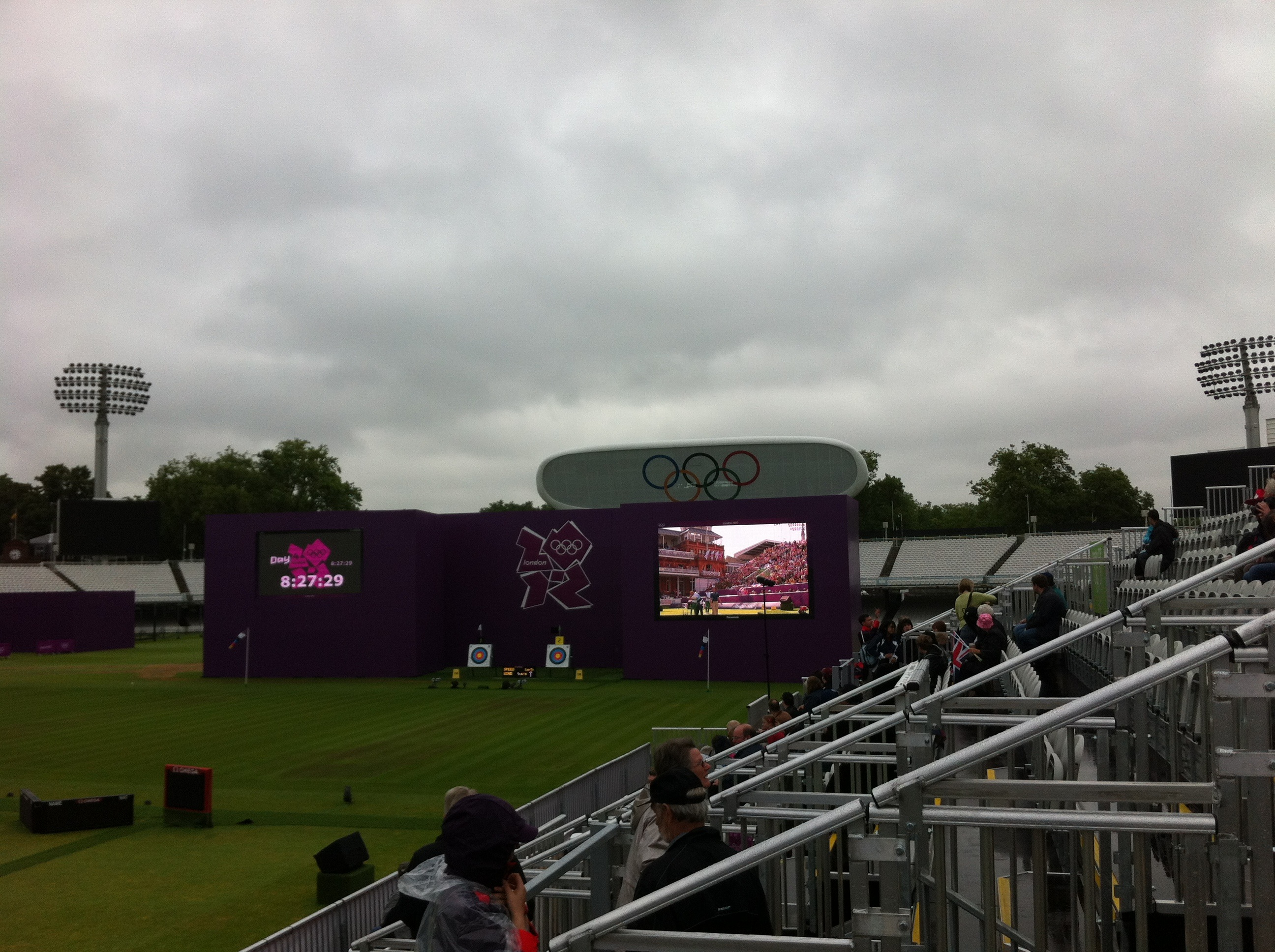
The Lord's Cricket Ground, where Guidi competed in archery.

The 2012 Summer Olympics marked Emanuele Guidi's first appearance at the Olympic Games at the age of 42. He qualified for the men's individual competition after receiving a wild card from the Tripartite Commission. The archery events at the 2012 London Games were held at the Lord's Cricket Ground. Guidi competed on 27 July in the ranking round, finishing 64th and last of all competitors with 589 points. He scored 110 points less than the leading competitor, Im Dong-Hyun of South Korea. Guidi competed against Im, the second-placed ranked archer in the world, in the Round of 64 three days later. Guidi made a good start but was unable to put Im under pressure throughout the contest and the latter took all three sets of the match to advance into the next round of the contest. After the competition, Guidi said to Reuters, "I am still shaking. Did you see me shaking on the shooting line? I had nothing to lose today. My first objective was being here and I am. I just hope I did not make such a bad performance."

=== Men ===
Athlete	Event	Ranking round		Round of 64	Round of 32	Round of 16	Quarterfinals	Semifinals	Final / BM	
Athlete	Event	Score	Seed	Opposition Score	Opposition Score	Opposition Score	Opposition Score	Opposition Score	Opposition Score	Rank
Emanuele Guidi	Men's individual	589	64	Im D-h (KOR) (1); L 0–6	Did not advance					

== Athletics ==
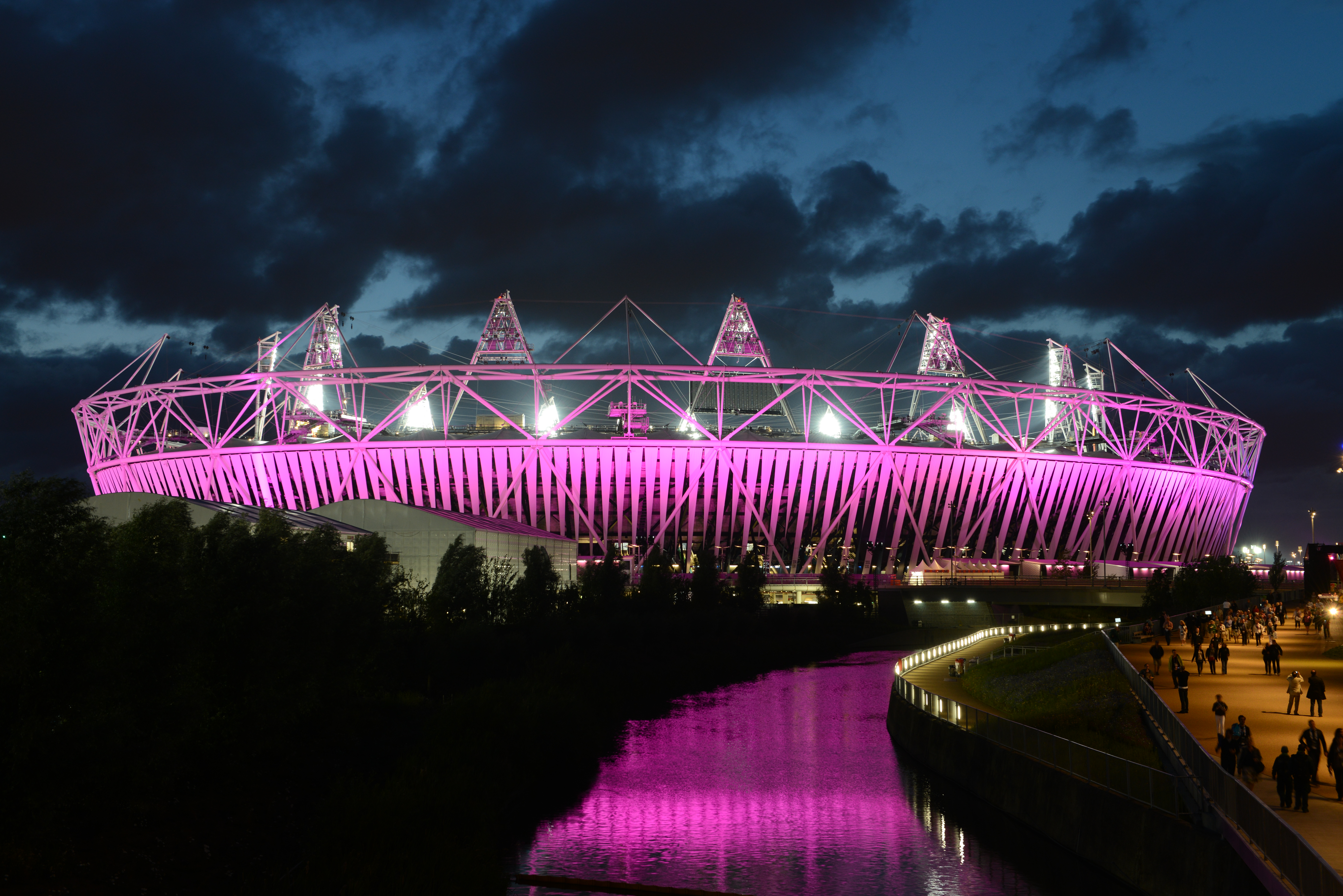
The London Olympic Stadium, where Pretelli competed in athletics.

Martina Pretelli was the sole representative of San Marino in athletics and was making her début at the Olympics at the age of 23. She was the first woman athletics competitor sent by San Marino to the Summer Olympics since the 1976 Montreal Games. Pretelli qualified by using a wild card because her best time of 12.15 seconds set at the 2011 Campionati Universitari Italiani in Turin was 0.77 seconds slower than the "B" qualifying standard for the women's 100 metres. San Marino was unable to send high jumper Eugenio Rossi because the governing body of athletics, the International Association of Athletics Federations, denied a request from the Sammarinese National Olympic Committee to allow him to compete in London. Pretelli was drawn in the fourth heat of the women's 100 metres on 3 August, finishing third out of nine runners with a time of 12.41 seconds. She placed 12th overall and did not advance into the quarter-finals after being two-tenths of a second slower than the slowest athlete who made the later stages. (Note: One athlete, Noor Hussain Al-Malki, was unable to finish.) Afterwards, Pretelli revealed her training was delayed by tendinitis and she was only able to run three races going into the Olympics.

===Key===
- Note–Ranks given for track events are within the athlete's heat only
- Q = Qualified for the next round

=== Women ===
Athlete	Event	Heat		Quarterfinal		Semifinal		Final	
Athlete	Event	Result	Rank	Result	Rank	Result	Rank	Result	Rank
Martina Pretelli	100 m	12.41	3	Did not advance					

== Shooting ==
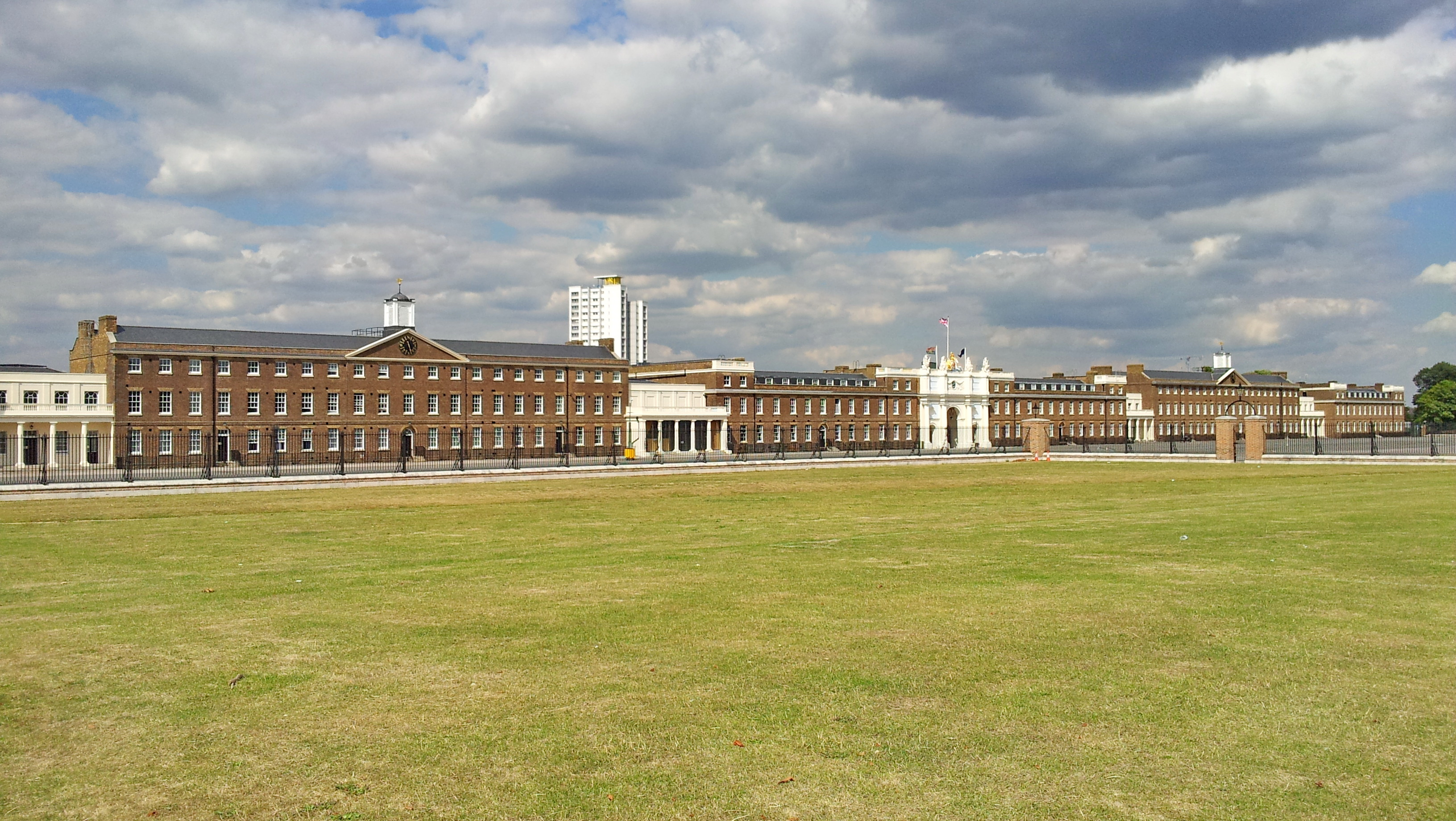
The Royal Artillery Barracks, where Alessandra Perilli competed in the women's trap shooting competition.

Alessandra Perilli was 24 years old at the time of the 2012 Summer Games and was making her début at the Olympics. She qualified for the women's trap contest by earning a quota spot through a victory in the 2011 ISSF World Cup in March that year. On 4 August Perilli competed in the qualification round of her event. She finished fifth out of 22nd athletes with a score of 71 points and qualified for the final held the same day due to her result. At the end of the final, Perilli was tied for second place with France's Delphine Réau and Zuzana Štefečeková of Slovakia with 93 points out of a possible 100. She then participated in a three-way shoot-out to determine the winners of the bronze and silver medals Perilli ended up finishing fourth overall and this stopped her from claiming San Marino's maiden medal at the Olympic Games but achieved the nation's best ever result at the Games. Despite the result, she spoke of her satisfaction with the effort she put in and dedicated the performance to her entourage and declared the fourth place result "a medal".

=== Women ===
Athlete	Event	Qualification		Final	
Athlete	Event	Points	Rank	Points	Rank
Alessandra Perilli	Trap	71	5 Q	93 S/O 1	4

== Swimming ==
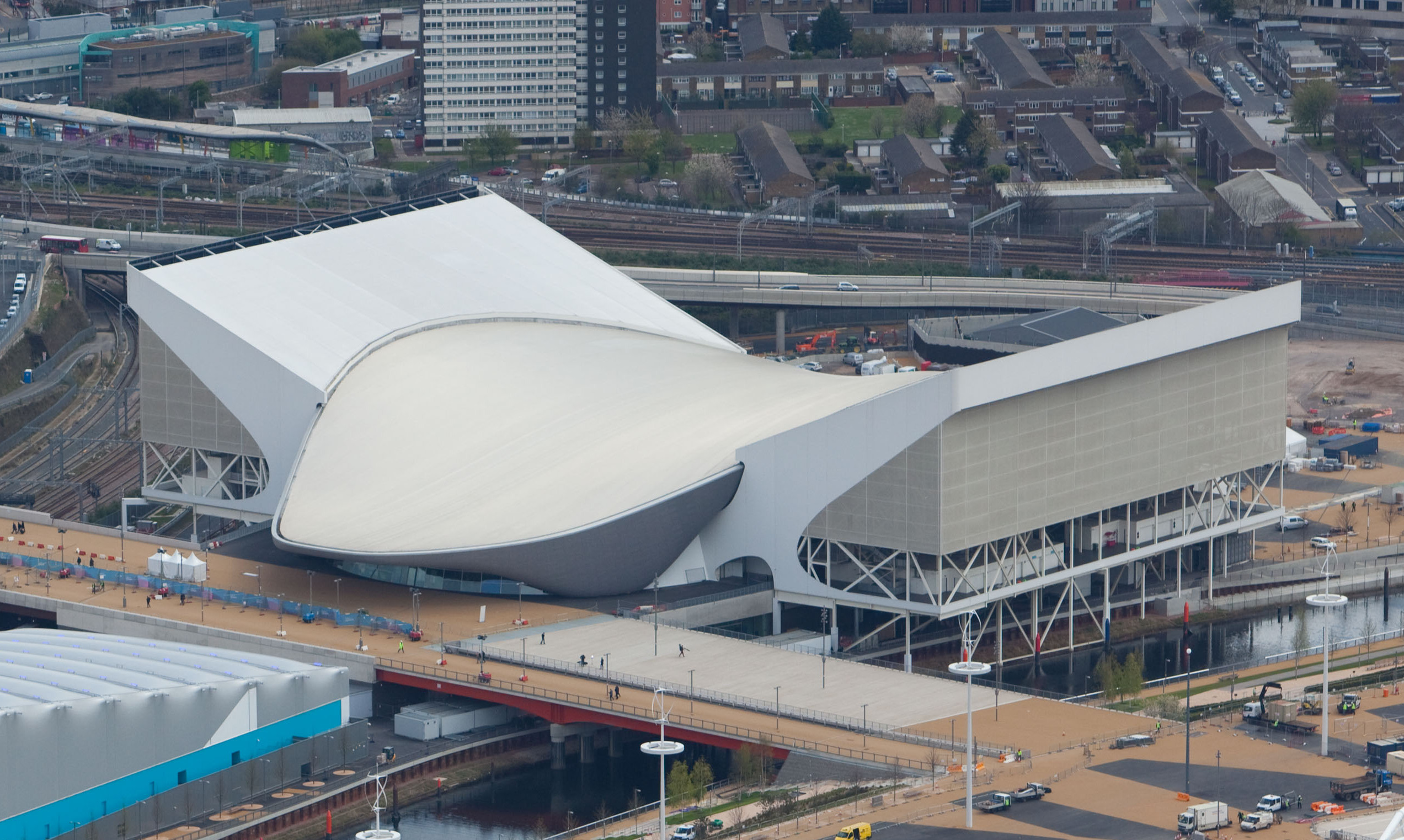
The London Aquatics Centre where Tini competed in the women's 100 metre freestyle event.

At the age of 20, Clelia Tini was entering the Olympic Games for the first time and was the only athlete to represent San Marino in swimming competition at the London Olympics. She qualified for the Games by using a universality place from swimming's world governing body FINA because her fastest time of 58.12 seconds was 1.58 seconds slower than the "B" (FINA/Olympic Invitation) qualification time for her event, the women's 100 metre freestyle. Tini set herself the goal of lowering her personal best and go below under 58 seconds, "I am very excited but I am also very charged. I am aware that I have prepared very well and have all the credentials to make a race in line with my expectations." She was drawn in heat three on 1 August, placing eighth and last of all swimmers with a time of 58.29 seconds. Tini was 38th overall and she could not advance into the semi-finals as her effort was 3.86 seconds off the slowest competitor who made the later stages. (Note: Two swimmers, Cate Campbell and Therese Alshammar, did not start.) After the event, she declared her happiness over her performance and revealed her preparation for the Olympics were hindered by a back injury.

=== Women ===
Athlete	Event	Heat		Semifinal		Final	
Athlete	Event	Time	Rank	Time	Rank	Time	Rank
Clelia Tini	100 m freestyle	58.29	38	Did not advance			
