= Cesaretti =

Cesaretti is an Italian surname. Notable people with the surname include:

- Cristian Cesaretti (born 1987), Italian footballer
- Daniele Cesaretti (born 1954), Sammarinese cyclist
- Gusmano Cesaretti, Italian photographer
- Spartaco Cesaretti (1921–1984), Sammarinese sport shooter
