= Shooting at the 2020 Summer Olympics – Mixed trap team =

Olympic shooting event

Mixed trap team at the Games of the XXXII Olympiad
- Olympic shooting pictogram
- Venue: Asaka Shooting Range
- Dates: 31 July 2021
- Competitors: 32 from 12 nations
- Teams: 16

Medalists
1st place, gold medalist(s)		Fátima Gálvez; Alberto Fernández	Spain
2nd place, silver medalist(s)		Alessandra Perilli; Gian Marco Berti	San Marino
3rd place, bronze medalist(s)		Madelynn Bernau; Brian Burrows	United States

The Mixed trap team event at the 2020 Summer Olympics took place on 31 July 2021 at the Asaka Shooting Range.

== Records ==
Prior to this competition, the existing world and Olympic records were as follows.

Qualification records
World record	United States (USA); Australia (AUS); Turkey (TUR)	149	Acapulco, Mexico	20 March 2019
Olympic record	Not established	–	–	–

== Schedule ==
All times are Japan Standard Time (UTC+9)

Date	Time	Round
Saturday, 31 July 2021	9:00	Qualification Precision
Saturday, 31 July 2021	13:30; 14:05	Bronze medal match Gold medal match

== Results ==
=== Qualification ===
Rank	Athletes	Nation	1	2	3	Total	Team total	S-off	Notes
1	Fátima Gálvez	Spain	24	25	24	73	148	+1	QG, OR
1	Alberto Fernández	Spain	25	25	25	75	148	+1	QG, OR
2	Alessandra Perilli	San Marino	25	24	25	74	148	+0	QG, OR
2	Gian Marco Berti	San Marino	25	24	25	74	148	+0	QG, OR
3	Zuzana Rehák-Štefečeková	Slovakia 1	24	25	25	74	146	+11	QB
3	Erik Varga	Slovakia 1	23	25	24	72	146	+11	QB
4	Madelynn Bernau	United States 2	25	25	25	75	146	+10	QB
4	Brian Burrows	United States 2	22	25	24	71	146	+10	QB
5	Yukie Nakayama	Japan	25	24	25	74	145		
5	Shigetaka Oyama	Japan	23	23	25	71	145		
6	Penny Smith	Australia 2	24	23	24	71	145		
6	Thomas Grice	Australia 2	25	25	24	74	145		
7	Laetisha Scanlan	Australia 1	25	23	24	72	145		
7	James Willett	Australia 1	25	25	23	73	145		
8	Jana Špotáková	Slovakia 2	23	25	22	70	144		
8	Marián Kovačócy	Slovakia 2	25	24	25	74	144		
9	Wang Xiaojing	China	24	25	23	72	144		
9	Yu Haicheng	China	25	23	24	72	144		
10	Kirsty Hegarty	Great Britain	22	23	25	70	143		
10	Matthew Coward-Holley	Great Britain	24	25	24	73	143		
11	Daria Semianova	ROC 1	25	22	22	69	142		
11	Aleksey Alipov	ROC 1	24	25	24	73	142		
12	Jessica Rossi	Italy	24	20	23	67	141		
12	Mauro De Filippis	Italy	24	25	25	74	141		
13	Kayle Browning	United States 1	20	25	24	69	140		
13	Derrick Mein	United States 1	25	21	25	71	140		
14	Ekaterina Subbotina	ROC 2	23	23	22	68	139		
14	Maxim Kabatskiy	ROC 2	23	25	23	71	139		
15	Alejandra Ramírez	Mexico	23	21	24	68	138		
15	Jorge Orozco	Mexico	23	25	22	70	138		
16	Maggy Ashmawy	Egypt	23	23	23	69	138		
16	Abdel-Aziz Mehelba	Egypt	23	24	22	69	138		

=== Finals ===
Rank	Athletes	Nation	Total	S-off
Gold medal match
1st place, gold medalist(s)	Fátima Gálvez; Alberto Fernández	Spain	41	
2nd place, silver medalist(s)	Alessandra Perilli; Gian Marco Berti	San Marino	40	
Bronze medal match
3rd place, bronze medalist(s)	Madelynn Bernau; Brian Burrows	United States 2	42	+3
4	Zuzana Rehák-Štefečeková; Erik Varga	Slovakia 1	42	+2
