= San Marino at the 1984 Summer Olympics =

- IOC code: SMR
- NOC: Sammarinese National Olympic Committee

in Los Angeles
- Competitors: 19 (18 men, 1 woman) in 7 sports
- Flag bearer: Maurizio Zonzini
- Medals: Gold 0 Silver 0 Bronze 0 Total 0

Summer Olympics appearances (overview)
- 1960; 1964; 1968; 1972; 1976; 1980; 1984; 1988; 1992; 1996; 2000; 2004; 2008; 2012; 2016; 2020; 2024

San Marino competed at the 1984 Summer Olympics in Los Angeles, United States. 19 competitors, 18 men and 1 woman, took part in 26 events in 7 sports.

== Coins commissioned ==
There were 2 coins commissioned in celebration the participation of The Republic of San Marino. One coin with a face value of 500 Sammarinese lira depicting the Three Towers of San Marino, three people and the Olympic symbols. The other worth a face value of 1000 Sammarinese lira showing the Three Towers of San Marino and two people standing on the Olympic symbols holding up a bird of prey.

== Athletics ==
Men's 20 km Walk

- Stefano Casali

- Final — 1:35:48 (→ 35th place)

Men's 800 meter

- Manlio Molinari

- Heat — 1:57.09 (→ 62nd place)

== Cycling ==
One cyclist represented San Marino in 1984.

Individual road race

- Maurizio Casadei — did not finish (→ no ranking)

== Gymnastics ==
- Maurizio Zonzini

Men's individual all around

ranked 65

Men's floor exercise

Ranked 66

Men's horse vault

Ranked 63

Men's parallel bars

Ranked 61

Men's horizontal bars

Ranked 68

Men's rings

Ranked 68

Men's pommeled horse

Ranked 34

== Judo ==
Men's extra-lightweight

- Alberto Francini

- Ranked 18

Men's middleweight

- Franch Casadei

- Ranked 18

== Sailing ==
Men's windsurfer

- Flavio Pelliccioni

- ranked 29

== Shooting ==
Men's Rapid-Fire Pistol, 25 metres

- Eliseo Paolini

- Ranked 29

- Bruno Morri

- Ranked 34

Men's Free Pistol, 50 metres

- Germano Bollini

- Tied for 51 with Gianfranco Giardi

- Gianfranco Giardi

- Tied for 51 with Germano Bollini

Men's Air Rifle, 10 metres

- Pasquale Raschi

- Ranked 51

Men's Small-Bore Rifle, Three Positions, 50 metres

- Pasquale Raschi

- Ranked 49

- Alfredo Pelliccioni

- Ranked 51

Men's Small-Bore Rifle, Prone, 50 metres

- Francesco Nanni

- Ranked 5 (best performance of entire Olympic team)

- Pier Paolo Taddei

- Ranked 62

Mixed Trap

- Luciano Santolini

- Ranked 31

- Elio Gasperoni

- 48

== Swimming ==
Men's 100m Freestyle

- Michele Piva

- Heat — 59.26 (→ did not advance, 63rd place)

Men's 200m Freestyle

- Michele Piva

- Heat — 2:15.39 (→ did not advance, 54th place)

Men's 100m Breaststroke

- Michele Piva

- Heat — 1:16.21 (→ did not advance, 48th place)

Men's 200m Individual Medley

- Michele Piva

- Heat — 2:29.81 (→ did not advance, 41st place)

Women's 100m Freestyle

- Daniela Galassi

- Heat — 1:06.19 (→ did not advance, 44th place)

Women's 200m Freestyle

- Daniela Galassi

- Heat — 2:19.22 (→ did not advance, 34th place)
