= Ciacci =

Ciacci is a surname of Italian origin. Notable people with the surname include:

- Little Tony (Antonio Ciacci; 1941–2013), Sammarinese pop singer and actor
- Catullo Ciacci (1934–1996), Italian cyclist
- Matteo Ciacci (born 1990), Sammarinese politician
- Nicola Ciacci (born 1982), Sammarinese footballer
- Sante Ciacci (born 1941), Sammarinese cyclist
