= San Marino at the 2016 Summer Olympics =

- IOC code: SMR
- NOC: Sammarinese National Olympic Committee
- Website: www.cons.sm (in Italian)

in Rio de Janeiro
- Competitors: 4 in 2 sports
- Flag bearer: Arianna Perilli
- Medals: Gold 0 Silver 0 Bronze 0 Total 0

Summer Olympics appearances (overview)
- 1960; 1964; 1968; 1972; 1976; 1980; 1984; 1988; 1992; 1996; 2000; 2004; 2008; 2012; 2016; 2020; 2024

San Marino competed at the 2016 Summer Olympics in Rio de Janeiro, Brazil, from 5 to 21 August 2016. Since the nation's official debut in 1960, Sammarinese athletes have appeared in every edition of the Summer Olympic Games, except for a single occasion. San Marino failed to register any athletes at the 1964 Summer Olympics in Tokyo.

San Marino National Olympic Committee (Italian: Comitato Olimpico Nazionale Sammarinese, CONS) sent a team of four athletes, two per gender, to compete only in athletics and shooting at the Games, matching the nation's roster size with four previous editions, including London 2012. All of them made their Olympic debut in Rio de Janeiro, except for trap shooter and London 2012 fourth-place finalist Alessandra Perilli, who only returned for her second Games as the most experienced competitor. Meanwhile, Alessandra's older sister Arianna Perilli led the delegation as San Marino's flag bearer in the opening ceremony. San Marino, however, had to wait five more years for its first medal.

== Athletics ==
San Marino has received a universality slot from IAAF to send a male athlete to the Olympics.

Key

- Note–Ranks given for track events are within the athlete's heat only
- Q = Qualified for the next round
- q = Qualified for the next round as a fastest loser or, in field events, by position without achieving the qualifying target
- NR = National record
- N/A = Round not applicable for the event
- Bye = Athlete not required to compete in round

Field events

Athlete	Event	Qualification		Final	
Athlete	Event	Distance	Position	Distance	Position
Eugenio Rossi	Men's high jump	2.17	35	Did not advance	

== Shooting ==
Sammarinese shooters have achieved quota places for the following events by virtue of their best finishes at the 2014 and 2015 ISSF World Championships, the 2015 ISSF World Cup series, and European Championships or Games, as long as they obtained a minimum qualifying standard (MQS) by March 31, 2016.

Athlete	Event	Qualification		Semifinal		Final	
Athlete	Event	Points	Rank	Points	Rank	Points	Rank
Stefano Selva	Men's trap	102	32	Did not advance			
Alessandra Perilli	Women's trap	63	16	Did not advance			
Arianna Perilli	Women's trap	65	13	Did not advance			

Qualification Legend: Q = Qualify for the next round; q = Qualify for the bronze medal (shotgun)
