= San Marino at the 1976 Summer Olympics =

- IOC code: SMR
- NOC: Sammarinese National Olympic Committee

in Montreal
- Competitors: 10 (8 men, 2 women) in 3 sports
- Flag bearer: Pilade Casali
- Medals: Gold 0 Silver 0 Bronze 0 Total 0

Summer Olympics appearances (overview)
- 1960; 1964; 1968; 1972; 1976; 1980; 1984; 1988; 1992; 1996; 2000; 2004; 2008; 2012; 2016; 2020; 2024

San Marino competed at the 1976 Summer Olympics in Montreal, Quebec, Canada. Ten competitors, eight men and two women, took part in seven events in three sports.

== Cycling ==
One cyclist represented San Marino in 1976.

Individual road race

- Daniele Cesaretti – did not finish (→ no ranking)
