= Shooting at the 2019 African Games =

- Venue: Centre des Chênes LAARJAT
- Location: Salé, Morocco
- Dates: 25–30 August

Shooting at the 2019 African Games was held from 25 to 30 August 2019 in Salé, Morocco.

== Participating nations ==
- Algeria
- Egypt
- Kenya
- Liberia
- Mauritania
- Morocco
- Namibia
- Nigeria
- Senegal
- Tunisia
- Zimbabwe

== Medal table ==
* Host nation (Morocco)

Rank	Nation	Gold	Silver	Bronze	Total
1	Egypt (EGY)	3	1	2	6
2	Morocco (MAR)*	2	3	2	7
3	Senegal (SEN)	0	1	0	1
4	Algeria (ALG)	0	0	1	1
Totals (4 entries)		5	5	5	15

== Medal summary ==
Event	Gold	Silver	Bronze
Trap Men	Ahmed Kamar; Egypt	Redouane Mouqtadir; Morocco	Younes Haj Ali; Morocco
Skeet Men	Mustapha Neblaoui; Morocco	Hassane Ramlaoui; Senegal	Sarkis Martayan; Egypt
Trap Women	Maggy Ashmawy; Egypt	Yasmine Marirhi; Morocco	Saadia Zeggane; Algeria
Skeet Women	Ibtissam Marirhi; Morocco	Amira Aboushokka; Egypt	Yasmina Mesfioui; Morocco
Trap Mixed	Egypt; Ahmed Kamar; Maggy Ashmawy	Morocco; Younes Haj Ali; Ibtissam Marirhi	Morocco; Ahmed Zaher; Suzan Khairallah
