= San Marino at the 1968 Summer Olympics =

- IOC code: SMR
- NOC: Sammarinese National Olympic Committee

in Mexico City
- Competitors: 4 in 2 sports
- Flag bearer: Leo Franciosi
- Medals: Gold 0 Silver 0 Bronze 0 Total 0

Summer Olympics appearances (overview)
- 1960; 1964; 1968; 1972; 1976; 1980; 1984; 1988; 1992; 1996; 2000; 2004; 2008; 2012; 2016; 2020; 2024

San Marino competed at the 1968 Summer Olympics in Mexico City, Mexico. They fielded four competitors, all men.

== Cycling ==
Two cyclists represented San Marino in 1968.

Individual road race

- Gerard Lettoli – 5:10:22.35 hrs (→ 60th place)
- Enzo Frisoni – 5:12:46.82 hrs (→ 61st place)

== Shooting ==
Two shooters represented San Marino in 1968.

Trap

- Leo Franciosi – 181 pts (→ 42nd place)
- Salvatore Pelliccioni – 177 pts (→ 45th place)
