= Shooting at the 2015 Pan American Games – Women's trap =

Shooting – Women's trap at the 2015 Pan American Games
- Venue: Pan Am Shooting Centre
- Dates: July 13
- Competitors: 10 from 6 nations

Medalists
Gold medal	Amanda Chudoba	Canada
Silver medal	Kayle Browning	United States
Bronze medal	Kimberley Bowers	United States

The women's trap shooting event at the 2015 Pan American Games was held on July 13 at Pan Am Shooting Centre in Innisfil. The event consisted of three rounds: a qualifier, a semifinal and a medal round. In the qualifier, each shooter fired three sets of 25 targets in trap shooting, with 10 targets being thrown to the left, 10 to the right, and five straight-away in each set. The shooters could take two shots at each target. The top six shooters in the qualifying round moved on to the semifinal, where they fired one additional round of 15 targets and only one shot could be taken at each target. The top two qualified to dispute the gold medal, and the third and fourth qualified to disputed the bronze medal. Ties are broken using a shoot-off; additional shots are fired one at a time until there is no longer a tie.

The winners of all fifteen events, along with the runner up in the men's air rifle, skeet, trap and both women's rifle events would qualify for the 2016 Summer Olympics in Rio de Janeiro, Brazil (granted the athlete had not yet earned a quota for their country).

== Schedule ==
All times are Eastern Daylight Time (UTC-4).

Date	Time	Round
July 13, 2015	9:00	Qualification
July 13, 2015	14:30	Semifinal
July 13, 2015	14:45	Finals

== Records ==
The existing world and Pan American Games records were as follows.

Qualification records
World record	Jessica Rossi (ITA); Corey Cogdell (USA)	75	London, England; Granada, Spain	April 8, 2012; July 5, 2013
Pan American record				

== Results ==
=== Qualification round ===
Rank	Athlete	Country	1	2	3	Total	Notes
1	Kayle Browning	United States	24	20	19	63	Q
2	Kimberley Bowers	United States	23	21	18	62	Q
3	Janice Teixeira	Brazil	19	21	20	60	Q
4	Amanda Chudoba	Canada	19	23	18	60	Q
5	Susan Nattrass	Canada	17	20	22	59	Q
6	Ana Latorre	Puerto Rico	18	22	18	58	Q
7	Pamela Salman	Chile	17	18	19	54	
8	Vivian Rodriguez	Puerto Rico	15	18	17	50	
9	Ana Soto	Guatemala	17	18	15	50	
10	Gisele Saraiva	Brazil	19	9	13	41	

=== Semifinal ===
Rank	Athlete	Country	Result	Shoot-off	Notes
1	Kayle Browning	United States	13		QG
1	Amanda Chudoba	Canada	13		QG
3	Kimberley Bowers	United States	11		QB
3	Ana Latorre	Puerto Rico	11		QB
5	Janice Teixeira	Brazil	10		
6	Susan Nattrass	Canada	9		

=== Finals ===
==== Bronze-medal match ====
Rank	Athlete	Country	Result	Shoot-off	Notes
3rd place, bronze medalist(s)	Kimberley Bowers	United States	11	+1+1	
4	Ana Latorre	Puerto Rico	11	+1+0	

==== Gold-medal match ====
Rank	Athlete	Country	Result	Shoot-off	Notes
1st place, gold medalist(s)	Amanda Chudoba	Canada	11	+1+1	
2nd place, silver medalist(s)	Kayle Browning	United States	11	+1+0	
