= Maggy Ashmawy =

Egyptian sport shooter (born 1992)

Personal information
- Born: 1 October 1992 (age 33) Cairo, Egypt
- Height: 1.73 m (5 ft 8 in)

Sport
- Country: Egypt
- Sport: Sport shooting
Medal record
Representing Egypt
African Games
Gold medal – first place	2019 Rabat	Trap
Gold medal – first place	2019 Rabat	Trap mixed

Maggy Ashmawy (Arabic: ماجي عشماوي; born 1 October 1992) is an Egyptian sport shooter. She represented Egypt at the 2019 African Games and won the gold medal in the women's trap event. She also won gold in the mixed trap event together with Ahmed Kamar.

In 2021, she competed in the women's trap event at the 2020 Summer Olympics held in Tokyo, Japan. She also competed in the women's trap event at the 2024 Summer Olympics held in Paris, France.
