= Yasmina Mesfioui =

Moroccan sport shooter

Personal information
- Nationality: Morocco
- Born: 9 April 1976 (age 50) Khouribga, Morocco
- Height: 1.66 m (5 ft 5 1/2 in)
- Weight: 57 kg (126 lb)

Sport
- Sport: Shooting
- Event: Trap
- Coached by: David Abihssira
Medal record
Representing Morocco
African Games
Bronze medal – third place	2019 Rabat	Skeet women

Yasmina Mesfioui (Arabic: ياسمينة المسفيوي; born April 9, 1976, in Khouribga) is a Moroccan sport shooter. Mesfioui represented Morocco at the 2012 Summer Olympics in London, where she competed in the women's trap. She scored a total of 61 targets in the qualifying rounds by one point behind India's Shagun Chowdhary, finishing in twenty-first place.
