= Whitly Loper =

American sport shooter (born 1986)

Whitley Loper
Personal information
- Full name: Collyn Loper
- Nationality: United States
- Born: December 31, 1986 (age 39) Jackson, Mississippi, U.S.
- Height: 5 ft 5 in (1.64 m)
- Weight: 150 lb (68 kg)

Sport
- Sport: Shooting
- Event: Trap (TR75)
- Club: USA Shooting
- Coached by: Lloyd Woodhouse
Medal record
Women's shooting
Representing the United States
Pan American Games
Gold medal – first place	2003 Santo Domingo	TR75

Collyn "Whitly" Loper (born December 31, 1986, in Jackson, Mississippi) is an American sport shooter. She won a gold medal in trap shooting at the 2003 Pan American Games in Santo Domingo, Dominican Republic, and eventually finished fourth at the 2004 Summer Olympics in Athens, narrowly missing out an opportunity to claim an Olympic medal. Since the age of fourteen, Loper has been serving throughout her sporting career for the U.S. national team, and trains rigorously under her longtime coach Lloyd Woodhouse. Naturally right-handed, Loper was born blind in her right eye that urged her to shoot left.

Having pursued the sport since the age of twelve, Loper started out as a successful junior with her third-place finish in the women's trap on her first major international competition at the 2001 World Championships in Cairo, Egypt. Two years later, Loper boasted her early success to the sport by claiming the gold medal at the Pan American Games in Santo Domingo, Dominican Republic, finishing ahead of Canada's Cynthia Meyer by a three-point lead 87 to 84. With her noteworthy triumph, Loper also secured an Olympic berth for the U.S. shooting team.

At the 2004 Summer Olympics in Athens, Loper competed as the youngest member of the U.S. shooting team (aged 17) in the women's trap. Five months before the Games, Loper finished first in a grueling shoot-off against Joetta Dement at the U.S. Olympic trials in Fort Benning, Georgia to keep her own Olympic place that she obtained from the Pan American Games. As one of the possible frontrunners vying for an Olympic medal in the sporting event, Loper put up her own monumental effort with a qualifying score of 62 hits out of a possible 75 to grab the third seed in the six-woman final, but narrowly missed out on a potential medal by just one target that allowed her South Korean rival Lee Bo-na to snatch the bronze, finishing only in fourth with a total score of 82. Admittedly, Loper broke her family's promise not to take a quick glimpse of the scoreboard as a result of her medal failure.
