= Shooting at the 2004 Summer Olympics – Women's trap =

Women's trap at the Games of the XXVIII Olympiad
- Venue: Markópoulo Olympic Shooting; Centre
- Date: August 16, 2004
- Competitors: 17 from 16 nations
- Winning score: 88

Medalists
1st place, gold medalist(s)		Suzanne Balogh	Australia
2nd place, silver medalist(s)		María Quintanal	Spain
3rd place, bronze medalist(s)		Lee Bo-na	South Korea

The women's trap competition at the 2004 Summer Olympics was held on August 16 at the Markópoulo Olympic Shooting Centre near Athens, Greece. Suzanne Balogh of Australia won the competition by a wide four-hit margin.

The event consisted of two rounds: a qualifier and a final. In the qualifier, each shooter fired 3 sets of 25 targets in trap shooting, with 10 targets being thrown to the left, 10 to the right, and 5 straight-away in each set. The shooters could take two shots at each target.

The top 6 shooters in the qualifying round moved on to the final round. There, they fired one additional round of 25 targets, where only one shot could be taken at each target. The total score from all 100 targets was used to determine final ranking. Ties are broken using a shoot-off; additional shots are fired one at a time until there is no longer a tie.

Australia's Suzanne Balogh battled her way against the gusty winds on a mountaintop range outside Athens to claim the gold medal in this event with a total score of 88 clay pigeons. Spain's María Quintanal took the silver with 84, while South Korea's Lee Bo-na hit 23 out of 25 targets for a combined record of 83 to grab a bronze, overwhelming 17-year-old American high school student Whitly Loper by just one shot.

Normally, no more than one competitor per country would be allowed in this event, but an exception was made for Canada to let Susan Nattrass take use of a redistributed quota place. 28 years after her Olympic debut, Nattrass reached the final but finished sixth.

== Records ==
Prior to this competition, the existing world and Olympic records were as follows.

Qualification records
World record	Viktoria Chuyko (UKR)	74	Nicosia, Cyprus	13 June 1998
Olympic record	Daina Gudzinevičiūtė (LTU)	71	Sydney, Australia	18 September 2000

Final records
World record	Elena Tkach (RUS)	97 (73+24)	Seoul, South Korea	12 May 2001
Olympic record	Daina Gudzinevičiūtė (LTU)	93 (71+22)	Sydney, Australia	18 September 2000

== Qualification round ==
Rank	Athlete	Country	1	2	3	Total	Shoot-off	Notes
1	Suzanne Balogh	Australia	23	23	20	66		Q
2	María Quintanal	Spain	24	19	22	65		Q
3	Susanne Kiermayer	Germany	20	21	21	62		Q
4	Whitly Loper	United States	21	20	21	62		Q
5	Susan Nattrass	Canada	20	22	19	61		Q
6	Lee Bo-na	South Korea	18	23	19	60	2	Q
7	Emanuela Felici	San Marino	20	21	19	60	1	
8	Taeko Takeba	Japan	20	19	20	59		
9	Sarah Gibbins	Great Britain	21	17	20	58		
9	Pia Hansen	Sweden	19	19	20	58		
9	Roberta Pelosi	Italy	20	15	23	58		
12	Stéphanie Neau	France	17	21	19	57		
13	Irina Laricheva	Russia	18	18	20	56		
14	Daina Gudzinevičiūtė	Lithuania	19	19	17	55		
15	Viktoria Chuyko	Ukraine	14	22	18	54		
16	Cynthia Meyer	Canada	20	16	16	52		
17	Gao E	China	15	15	18	48		

Q Qualified for final

== Final ==
Rank	Athlete	Qual	Final	Total
1st place, gold medalist(s)	Suzanne Balogh (AUS)	66	22	88
2nd place, silver medalist(s)	María Quintanal (ESP)	65	19	84
3rd place, bronze medalist(s)	Lee Bo-na (KOR)	60	23	83
4	Whitly Loper (USA)	62	20	82
5	Susanne Kiermayer (GER)	62	17	79
6	Susan Nattrass (CAN)	61	15	76
