= San Marino at the 1980 Summer Olympics =

- Flag of the Olympic Movement
- IOC code: SMR
- NOC: Sammarinese National Olympic Committee

in Moscow
- Competitors: 16 in 5 sports
- Medals: Gold 0 Silver 0 Bronze 0 Total 0

Summer Olympics appearances (overview)
- 1960; 1964; 1968; 1972; 1976; 1980; 1984; 1988; 1992; 1996; 2000; 2004; 2008; 2012; 2016; 2020; 2024

San Marino competed at the 1980 Summer Olympics in Moscow, USSR. Sixteen competitors, all men, took part in ten events in five sports. In partial support of the American-led boycott of the 1980 Summer Olympics, San Marino competed under the Olympic Flag instead of its national flag.

== Athletics ==
Men's 20 km Walk

- Stefano Casali

- Final — 1:49:21.3 (→ 24th place)

== Cycling ==
Two cyclists represented San Marino in 1980.

Individual road race

- Maurizio Casadei
- Roberto Tomassini
