= Viktoria Chuyko =

Ukrainian sport shooter

Personal information
- Full name: Viktoriya Vasylivna Chuiko
- Nationality: Ukraine
- Born: 1 March 1972 (age 54) Kiev, Ukrainian SSR, Soviet Union
- Height: 1.90 m (6 ft 3 in)
- Weight: 90 kg (198 lb)

Sport
- Sport: Shooting
- Event: Trap (TR75)
Medal record
Women's shooting
Representing Ukraine
World Championships
Gold medal – first place	2003 Nicosia	TR75

Viktoriya Vasylivna Chuiko (also Viktoria Chuyko, Ukrainian: Вікторія Василівна Чуйко; born 1 March 1972 in Kiev) is a Ukrainian sport shooter. She represented her nation Ukraine in trap shooting at the 2004 Summer Olympics, and currently holds the prelim world record in her own discipline, set at the 1998 European Shooting Championships in Nicosia, Cyprus with a marvelous score of 74 hits.

Chuyko qualified for the Ukrainian squad in the women's trap at the 2004 Summer Olympics in Athens, by securing her Olympic ticket and having obtained a minimum score of 71 hits to claim the gold medal at the 2003 ISSF World Shotgun Championships in Nicosia, Cyprus. She amassed a total score of 54 hits out of 75 targets to seal a fifteenth-place finish in the prelims, escaping from the last spot in a field of seventeen shooters by six hits.
