= Stéphanie Neau =

French sport shooter

Personal information
- Full name: Stéphanie Neau
- Nationality: France
- Born: 16 September 1975 (age 50) Blois, France
- Height: 1.69 m (5 ft 6 1/2 in)
- Weight: 70 kg (154 lb)

Sport
- Sport: Shooting
- Event: Trap (TR75)
- Club: BTC Chatelaillon
- Coached by: Marc Mennessier
Medal record
Women's shooting
Representing France
European Championships
Bronze medal – third place	2009 Osijek	TR75

Stéphanie Neau (French pronunciation: [stefani no]; born September 16, 1975 in Blois) is a French sport shooter. She was selected to compete for France in trap shooting at the 2004 Summer Olympics in Athens, and eventually won a bronze medal at the 2009 European Championships in Osijek, Croatia. Neau is a member of Ball Trap Club Chatelaillon in Châtelaillon-Plage, where she trains throughout her sport career under personal coach and 1996 Olympian Marc Mennessier.

Neau qualified for a French team, as a 29-year-old, in women's trap shooting at the 2004 Summer Olympics in Athens. She outplayed her rival and 2000 Olympic silver medalist Delphine Racinet by only three points 87 to 84 at the European Grand Prix meet in Brno, Czech Republic to snatch the Olympic place that her rival claimed from the ISSF World Cup series a year earlier. Neau marked 57 hits out of a possible 75 to finish twelfth from a small field of seventeen shooters in the qualifying round, failing to advance to the final.
