= Amanda Chudoba =

Canadian sport shooter (born 1990)

Personal information
- Full name: Amanda Chudoba-Obrigewitch
- Born: June 29, 1990 (age 35) Edmonton, Alberta, Canada
- Height: 168 cm (5 ft 6 in)
- Weight: 70 kg (154 lb)

Sport
- Country: Canada
- Sport: Shooting
- Event: Trap (TR75)
Medal record
Women's shooting
Representing Canada
Pan American Games
Gold medal – first place	2015 Toronto	Trap
Bronze medal – third place	2019 Lima	Mixed trap

Amanda Chudoba-Obrigewitch (born June 29, 1990) is a Canadian trap shooter. She was born in Edmonton, Alberta, Canada and shoots for the Canadian International Trap team, and represents Canada in Women's trap shooting.

Chudoba won Gold at the 2015 Pan American Games in Toronto, Ontario, Canada. This allowed Canada a quota spot for Women's Trap Shooting for the 2016 Olympics in Rio.
