= Shooting at the 2020 Summer Olympics – Women's trap =

Olympic shooting event

Women's trap at the Games of the XXXII Olympiad
- Olympic shooting pictogram
- Venue: Asaka Shooting Range
- Dates: 28–29 July 2021
- Competitors: 26 from 19 nations

Medalists
1st place, gold medalist(s)		Zuzana Rehák-Štefečeková	Slovakia
2nd place, silver medalist(s)		Kayle Browning	United States
3rd place, bronze medalist(s)		Alessandra Perilli	San Marino

The Women's trap event at the 2020 Summer Olympics took place on 28 and 29 July 2021 at the Asaka Shooting Range.

== Records ==
Prior to this competition, the existing world and Olympic records were as follows.

Qualification records
World record	Satu Mäkelä-Nummela (FIN)	123	Acapulco, Mexico	18 March 2019
Olympic record	Not established	–	–	–

Final records
World record	Ashley Carroll (USA)	48	Guadalajara, Mexico	5 March 2018
Olympic record	Not established	–	–	–

== Schedule ==
All times are Japan Standard Time (UTC+9)

Date	Time	Round
Wednesday, 28 July 2021; Thursday, 29 July 2021	9:00; 9:00	Qualification
Thursday, 29 July 2021	14:30	Final

== Results ==
=== Qualification ===
Rank	Athlete	Country	1	2	3	4	5	Total	Notes
1	Zuzana Rehák-Štefečeková	Slovakia	25	25	25	25	25	125	Q, WR, OR
2	Alessandra Perilli	San Marino	24	25	25	24	24	122	Q
3	Silvana Stanco	Italy	24	25	25	23	24	121+3	Q
4	Laetisha Scanlan	Australia	24	25	24	23	25	121+2	Q
5	Penny Smith	Australia	23	24	25	24	24	120+2	Q
6	Kayle Browning	United States	23	24	24	24	25	120+1	Q
7	Madelynn Bernau	United States	24	25	22	24	24	119	
8	Jessica Rossi	Italy	25	23	24	23	24	119	
9	Sandra Bernal	Poland	24	23	22	24	25	118	
10	Natalie Rooney	New Zealand	23	23	23	23	25	117	
11	Wang Xiaojing	China	22	24	23	24	24	117	
12	Carole Cormenier	France	25	23	24	23	22	117	
13	Alejandra Ramírez	Mexico	22	23	25	21	25	116	
14	Fátima Gálvez	Spain	22	24	22	25	23	116	
15	Daria Semianova	ROC	22	24	24	23	23	116	
16	Kirsty Hegarty	Great Britain	24	24	23	22	23	116	
17	Ekaterina Subbotina	ROC	24	24	25	20	23	116	
18	Deng Weiyun	China	21	25	23	22	24	115	
19	Yukie Nakayama	Japan	21	24	22	25	23	115	
20	Selin Ali	Bulgaria	22	24	23	24	22	115	
21	Ray Bassil	Lebanon	24	20	23	24	23	114	
22	Maggy Ashmawy	Egypt	19	24	24	22	24	113	
23	Ana Waleska Soto	Guatemala	21	23	23	23	23	113	
24	Satu Mäkelä-Nummela	Finland	23	23	24	21	22	113	
25	Mélanie Couzy	France	22	22	22	22	22	110	
26	Adriana Ruano	Guatemala	23	21	22	23	21	110	

=== Final ===
Rank	Athlete	Series						Notes
Rank	Athlete	1	2	3	4	5	6	Notes
1st place, gold medalist(s)	Zuzana Rehák-Štefečeková (SVK)	21	25	30	34	38	43	OR
2nd place, silver medalist(s)	Kayle Browning (USA)	20	24	29	34	37	42	
3rd place, bronze medalist(s)	Alessandra Perilli (SMR)	19	23	26	29			
4	Laetisha Scanlan (AUS)	19	24	26				
5	Silvana Stanco (ITA)	17	22					
6	Penny Smith (AUS)	13						
