= Silvano Raganini =

Sammarinese sports shooter

Personal information
- Born: 10 December 1943 (age 82)

Sport
- Sport: Sports shooting

Silvano Raganini (born 10 December 1943) is a Sammarinese former sports shooter. He competed at the 1972 Summer Olympics and the 1976 Summer Olympics.

Outside of sport, Raganini worked as a hotelier.
