= Kimberley Bowers =

American Trap Shooter

Personal information
- Born: 1993 (age 32–33) Berkeley, California, United States
- Home town: Lafayette, California, United States

Sport
- Sport: Shooting sports
Medal record
Representing United States
Pan American Games
Bronze medal – third place	2015 Toronto	Trap

Kimberley Bowers (born 1993), is an American trap shooter. She was born in Berkeley, California USA and shoots for USA Shooting. She represents the US in Women's Trap Shooting.

Bowers won bronze at the 2015 Pan American Games in Toronto, Ontario Canada.
