= Brian Burrows =

American sport shooter (born 1988)

Personal information
- Born: February 17, 1988 (age 38) Torrance, California, U.S.
- Height: 5 ft 11 in (180 cm)
- Weight: 193 lb (88 kg)

Sport
- Country: United States
- Sport: Shooting
- Event: Trap
Medal record
Men's shooting
Representing United States
Olympic Games
Bronze medal – third place	2020 Tokyo	Mixed trap
Pan American Games
Gold medal – first place	2019 Lima	Trap
Silver medal – second place	2019 Lima	Mixed trap

Brian Burrows (born February 17, 1988, in Torrance, California) is an American sport shooter. Burrows and Madelynn Bernau won the bronze medal in the mixed trap team event at the 2020 Summer Olympics held in Tokyo, Japan.

Burrows won the gold medal in the men's trap event at the 2019 Pan American Games held in Lima, Peru. He also won the silver medal in the mixed trap event together with Rachel Tozier.

In 2021, he represented the United States at the 2020 Summer Olympics in Tokyo, Japan.
