= Sara Casadei =

Sammarinese swimmer

Personal information
- Born: 2 October 1975 (age 50)

Sport
- Sport: Swimming

Sara Casadei (born 2 October 1975) is a Sammarinese swimmer. She competed in the women's 50 metre freestyle event at the 1992 Summer Olympics. Casadei was the flag bearer for San Marino in the 1992 Summer Olympics opening ceremony.
