= Danilo Zavoli =

Sammarinese swimmer

Personal information
- Born: 1 April 1973 (age 53) Rimini, Italy

Sport
- Sport: Swimming

Danilo Zavoli (born 1 April 1973) is a Sammarinese swimmer. He competed in two events at the 1992 Summer Olympics.
