= Ahmed Kamar =

Egyptian sport shooter (born 1986)

Personal information
- Born: 19 September 1986 (age 39) Giza, Egypt

Sport
- Sport: Sports shooting
Medal record
Representing Egypt
African Games
Gold medal – first place	2019 Rabat	Trap men
Gold medal – first place	2019 Rabat	Trap mixed

Ahmed Kamar (born 19 September 1986) is an Egyptian sports shooter. He competed in the men's trap event at the 2016 Summer Olympics.
