= Ibtissam Marirhi =

Moroccan sports shooter

Personal information
- Nationality: Moroccan
- Born: 27 May 1989 (age 37)

Sport
- Sport: Sports shooting

Ibtissam Marirhi (born 27 May 1989) is a Moroccan sports shooter. She competed in the women's skeet event at the delayed 2020 Summer Olympics.
