= Leo Franciosi =

Sammarinese sports shooter

Personal information
- Born: Leo Marino Franciosi; 28 August 1932 (age 93) San Marino, San Marino
- Height: 172 cm (5 ft 8 in)
- Weight: 74 kg (163 lb)

Sport
- Country: San Marino
- Sport: Sport shooting
- Event: Trap

Leo Marino Franciosi (born 28 August 1932) is a Sammarinese former sport shooter. He competed at the 1960, 1968, 1976 and 1980 Summer Olympics.

== Biography ==
Franciosi was born on 28 August 1932 in the city of San Marino, in the microstate of San Marino. His father, Umberto, was a butcher, and Franciosi grew up in the hillsides in the village of Borgo Maggiore. He began working at his father's butcher shop at age 14. He also was a competitive sport shooter and in 1960, he was selected to participate for San Marino at the 1960 Summer Olympics in Rome, San Marino's first time competing at the games. Competing in the men's trap event, he placed 24th out of the 36 who advanced to the finals, hitting 176 of 200 targets, while the winner, Ion Dumitrescu, hit 192.

Franciosi returned to the Olympics in 1968 as one of two Sammarinese trap shooters selected. He served as the flag bearer for San Marino in the 1968 Summer Olympics opening ceremony. There, he had what the Los Angeles Times described in 1984 as his country's "greatest moment" at the Olympics, where the "beloved" Franciosi finished the first day's competition tied for first, after having not missed any shots. The Times noted that "the populace followed his progress minute by minute as best they could." The head of the Sammarinese National Olympic Committee recalled that "there was very great hope he could be first or second. He was afraid to win. He said, 'My gosh, I'm winning. I'm going to win' ... That's when you lose." He missed a number of shots on the second day and fell out of medal contention, ultimately placing 42nd.

Franciosi returned for the 1976 Summer Olympics, where he placed tied for 21st with a score of 175 out of 200. He competed at his final Olympics in 1980 in Moscow, tying with fellow Sammarinese Elio Gasperoni for 22nd place, with a score of 185. He retired afterwards and continued working at his father's butcher shop. By 1984, he was married. In later years, he competed in bowls, and by 2024, he was San Marino's oldest living Olympian.
