= Kayle Browning =

American sport shooter (born 1992)

Personal information
- Born: July 9, 1992 (age 33) Conway, Arkansas, U.S.
- Education: University of Central Arkansas
- Height: 5 ft 6 in (168 cm)
- Weight: 135 lb (61 kg)

Sport
- Country: United States
- Sport: Shooting
- Event: Trap
Medal record
Women's shooting
Representing United States
Olympic Games
Silver medal – second place	2020 Tokyo	Trap
World Championships
Gold medal – first place	2019 Lonato del Garda	Trap team
Bronze medal – third place	2018 Changwon	Trap team
Pan American Games
Silver medal – second place	2015 Toronto	Trap
Bronze medal – third place	2011 Guadalajara	Trap
Championships of the Americas
Gold medal – first place	2018 Guadalajara	Trap
Gold medal – first place	2018 Guadalajara	Trap team

Kayle Browning (born July 9, 1992) is an American sport shooter. She participated at the 2018 ISSF World Shooting Championships, winning a medal. Browning was an alternate for the 2012 Olympics and is a silver medalist in the 2020 Olympics in trap shooting.

Browning is a graduate of Greenbrier High School and attended University of Central Arkansas.

== Records ==
Current world records held in trap
Mixed Team	Qualification	149	Kayle Browning (USA); Brian Burrows (USA) Safiye Sariturk (TUR); Nedim Tolga Tuncer (TUR) Penny Smith (AUS); Mitchell Iles-Crevatin (AUS)	March 20, 2019 March 20, 2019 March 20, 2019	Guadalajara (MEX) Guadalajara (MEX) Guadalajara (MEX)
