= Vito Corbelli =

Sammarinese cyclist

Personal information
- Born: 17 February 1941 (age 85) Rimini, Italy

Cycling career
- Sport: Cycling

Vito Corbelli (born 17 February 1941) is a former Sammarinese cyclist. He competed in the individual road race and team time trial events at the 1960 Summer Olympics.
