= Roberto Tamagnini =

Sammarinese sports shooter

Personal information
- Born: 1 March 1942 (age 84) San Marino

Sport
- Sport: Sports shooting

Roberto Tamagnini (born 1 March 1942) is a Sammarinese former sports shooter. He competed at the 1972, 1976 and the 1980 Summer Olympics.

Outside of sport, Tamagnini worked as a traffic officer.
