= Emanuele Guidi =

Sammarinese archer (born 1969)

Personal information
- Full name: Emanuele Guidi
- Born: September 16, 1969 (age 56)

Sport
- Sport: Archery
- Team: San Marino

Emanuele Guidi (born September 16, 1969) is a Sammarinese professional archer. He represented San Marino at the 2012 Summer Olympics where he finished 64th in the Men's individual. At the time of the 2012 games, Guidi ranked 394th in the world.
