= Giorgia Cesarini =

Sammarinese archer (born 2002)

- Born: August 12, 2002 (age 23); Borgo Maggiore
- Known for: Olympic archer for San Marino

Giorgia Cesarini (born August 12, 2002) is a Sammarinese archer who contested the Paris Olympics. She was the first woman Sammarinese archer at an Olympics and she carried their flag in the closing ceremony.

== Life ==
Cesarini was born in 2002 in Borgo Maggiore.

She began to compete internationally in 2018 when she ran in the 100m at the European Under 18 Championships in Győr, Hungary. Her time of 14"14 placed her eighth and she was about sixteen. She was part of San Marino's athletics team at European events open to her country. At Skopje she ran in the 4×100 m and 4×400 m relay teams in 2019. In 2021 she was in Limmasol in Cyprus contesting the javelin and in 2023 she went to Chorzów in Poland to throw the javelin (8th) and the shot put (11th) at the 2023 European Athletics Team Championships Third Division.

In 2019, she went to the World Archery championships in Berlin. She came 130th in the individual recurve bow missing on the next round. The next years championship was in Essen and she was more successful as she beat Astrid Daxböck 7-3 to finish 32nd breaking her nation's record with 649 points. She was beaten by Ukraine's Olha Chebotarenko 7-1. At university she gave up archery but the COVID-19 pandemic made her rethink and she decided to double-down on what had been her hobby.

She went to Paris as her name was one of four that was put forward by World Archery to compete at the 2024 Paris Olympics. San Marino had lobbied for her to be chosen. She was the first Samminese woman archer to go to an Olympics and she was only the third archer. Her score was 625 points and she came 58th. She was beaten by the German Michelle Kroppen who was a team Olympic medallist from the previous Olympics and in Paris. Cesarini had a score that was better than seven of her fellow contestants.

She was 21 when she was her country's flag bearer in the closing ceremony in Paris accompanied by her teammate, the wrestler Myles Amine.
