= Madelynn Bernau =

American sport shooter (born 1998)

Personal information
- Full name: Madelynn Ann Bernau
- Nationality: American
- Born: June 1, 1998 (age 28) Racine, Wisconsin, U.S.
- Education: Martin Methodist College
- Height: 5 ft 6 in (168 cm)

Sport
- Country: United States
- Sport: Shooting
- Event: Trap
Medal record
Women's shooting
Representing United States
Olympic Games
Bronze medal – third place	2020 Tokyo	Mixed trap

Madelynn Ann Bernau (born June 1, 1998, in Racine, Wisconsin) is an American sport shooter. Bernau and Brian Burrows won the bronze medal in the mixed trap team event at the 2020 Summer Olympics held in Tokyo, Japan.
