= Emanuela Felici =

Sammarinese sport shooter

Personal information
- Full name: Emanuela Felici
- Nationality: San Marino
- Born: 22 December 1980 (age 45) Borgo Maggiore, San Marino
- Height: 1.61 m (5 ft 3 1/2 in)
- Weight: 60 kg (132 lb)

Sport
- Sport: Shooting
- Event: Trap (TR75)

Emanuela Felici (born 22 December 1980 in Borgo Maggiore) is a Sammarinese sport shooter. She represented her nation San Marino in two editions of the Olympic Games (2000 and 2004), finishing seventh each in the process. Considered one of the world's top female trap shooters, Felici pocketed two career bronze medals at the 2002 European Championships in Lonato del Garda, Italy, and at the 2007 ISSF World Cup Series in Maribor, Slovenia.

== Biography ==
Felici made her official debut at the 2000 Summer Olympics in Sydney, where she wound up to seventh in the inaugural women's trap with a score of 64 hits, narrowly missing a spot for the final round by just a single point behind Russia's Yelena Tkach. Felici was also appointed by the San Marino Olympic Committee (Italian: Comitato Olimpico Nazionale Sammarinese) to carry the national flag in the opening ceremony.

At the 2004 Summer Olympics in Athens, Felici qualified for her second Sammarinese squad, as a 23-year-old, in the women's trap by finishing ninth and securing an Olympic ticket from the 2003 ISSF World Cup series in Granada, Spain. She amassed a total score of 60 hits out of 75 targets in the qualifying stage, but fell abruptly in a shoot-off for the final round against South Korean shooter and eventual bronze medalist Lee Bo-na by 2 to 1, matching her position from the previous Games in the process.
