= Alberto Fernández (sport shooter) =

Spanish sport shooter (born 1983)

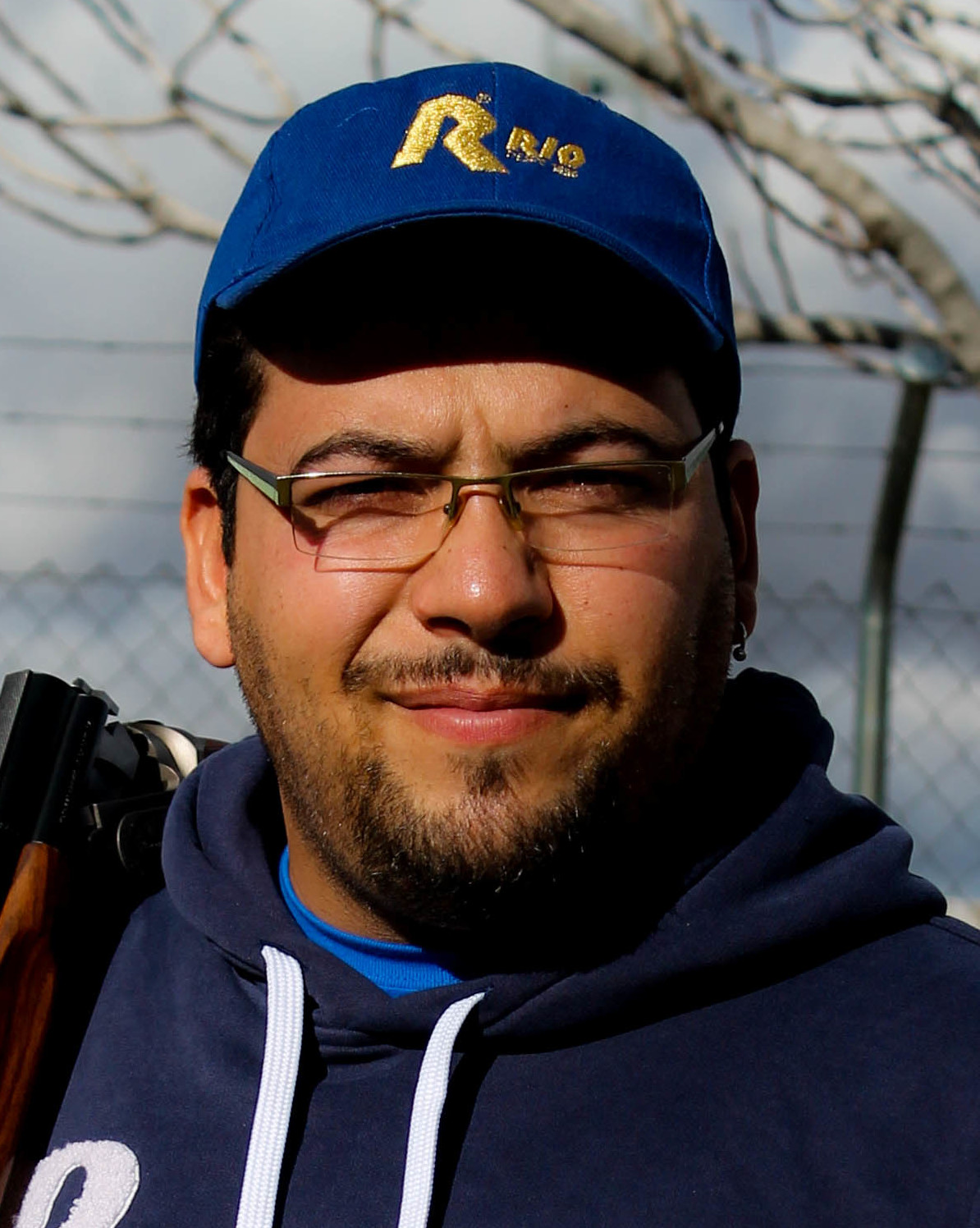
- Fernández in 2014

Personal information
- Full name: Alberto Fernández Muñoz
- Nationality: Spanish
- Born: 16 June 1983 (age 43) Madrid, Spain
- Height: 1.81 m (5 ft 11 in)
- Weight: 100 kg (220 lb)

Sport
- Country: Spain
- Sport: Shooting
- Event: Trap
- Club: Las Acacias
Medal record
Men's shooting
Representing Spain
Olympic Games
Gold medal – first place	2020 Tokyo	Mixed trap
World Championships
Gold medal – first place	2010 Munich	Trap
Gold medal – first place	2018 Changwon	Trap
European Championships
Gold medal – first place	2024 Lonato	Trap

Alberto Fernández Muñoz (Note: In this Spanish name, the first or paternal surname is Fernández and the second or maternal family name is Muñoz.) (born 16 June 1983 in Madrid) is a Spanish trap shooter. He competes in Trap Shooting and Olympic pit, being triple world champion in the years 2010, 2013, and 2018.

He has won three gold medals at the World Shooting Championships, between 2010 and 2018, and five medals at the European Shooting Championships, between 2006 and 2015.

He competed in four Summer Olympics, winning the gold medal in the mixed trap team event at the 2020 Summer Olympics in Tokyo, in team with Fátima Gálvez. In the individual trap event, he was 33rd in Beijing 2008, 25th in London 2012, 17th in Rio de Janeiro 2016, and 9th in Tokyo.

== International achievements ==
Summer Olympic Games
Year	Place	Medal	Competition
2020	Tokyo (Japan)	Gold	Mixed Team Competition
ISSF World Shooting Championships
2010	Munich (Germany)	Gold	Individual
2013	Lima (Peru)	Gold	Team Competition
2018	Changwon (South Korea)	Gold	Individual
ISSF European Shooting Championships
Year	Place	Medal	Competition
2006	Maribor (Slovenia)	Bronze	Individual
2006	Maribor (Slovenia)	Bronze	Team Competition
2010	Kazan (Russia)	Gold	Individual
2015	Maribor (Slovenia)	Silver	Individual
2015	Maribor (Slovenia)	Bronze	Team Competition

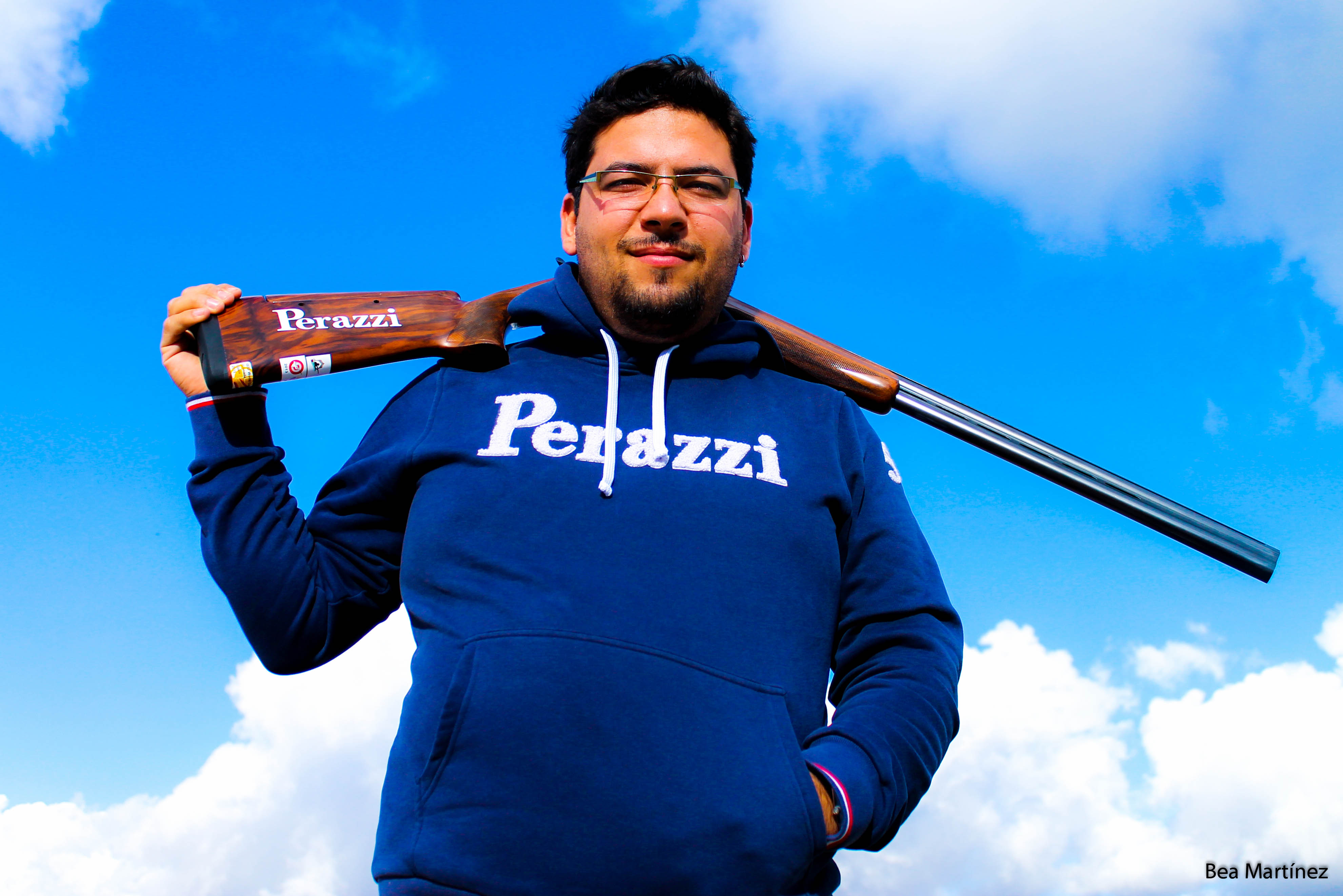
Alberto Fernández in 2014
