= Gian Marco Berti =

Sammarinese sports shooter (born 1982)

Personal information
- Nationality: Sammarinese
- Born: 11 November 1982 (age 43) San Marino, San Marino

Sport
- Sport: Sports shooting
Medal record
Men's sport shooting
Representing San Marino
Olympic Games
Silver medal – second place	2020 Tokyo	Mixed team trap
European Championships
Bronze medal – third place	2024 Lonato	Mixed team trap
Mediterranean Games
Bronze medal – third place	2022 Oran	Trap
Games of the Small States of Europe
Gold medal – first place	2025 Andorra la Vella	Trap

Gian Marco Berti (born 11 November 1982) is a Sammarinese sports shooter. He competed in the men's trap and the mixed trap team events at the 2020 Summer Olympics. In the mixed trap team event he won a silver medal with Alessandra Perilli which made them San Marino's first Olympic silver medallists.

He won the bronze medal in the men's trap event at the 2022 Mediterranean Games held in Oran, Algeria.

== Personal life ==
Berti studied law at the University of Urbino. His father, Gian Nicola, represented San Marino in sport shooting at the 1988 Summer Olympics.
