= Sante Ciacci =

Sammarinese cyclist (born 1941)

Personal information
- Born: 22 November 1941 (age 84) San Leo, Italy

Cycling career
- Sport: Cycling

Sante Ciacci (born 22 November 1941) is an Italian-born Sammarinese former cyclist. He competed in the individual road race and team time trial events at the 1960 Summer Olympics.
