= Dominique Canti =

Sammarinese sprinter

Dominique Fabien Canti (born 17 February 1967) is a former Sammarinese sprinter who competed in the men's 100m competition at the 1992 Summer Olympics. He recorded an 11.14, not enough to qualify for the next round past the heats. His personal best is 10.60, set in 1992. Additionally, he was on San Marino's 4 × 100 m relay team in the 1992 Olympiad, where they timed at 42.08. At the 1988 Summer Olympics, he ran an 11.11 in the 100m contest. Canti was the flag bearer for San Marino in the 1988 Summer Olympics opening ceremony.
