= Paolo Tura =

Sammarinese archer (born 1971)

Personal information
- Nationality: Sammarinese
- Born: 10 February 1971 (age 55)

Sport
- Sport: Archery

Paolo Tura (born 10 February 1971) is a Sammarinese archer. He competed at the 1992 Summer Olympics and the 1996 Summer Olympics.
