= Filippo Piva =

Sammarinese swimmer

Personal information
- Born: 22 August 1967 (age 58)

Sport
- Sport: Swimming

Filippo Piva (born 22 August 1967) is a Sammarinese swimmer. He competed at the 1988 Summer Olympics and the 1992 Summer Olympics.
