= Guglielmo Giusti =

Sammarinese sports shooter

Personal information
- Born: 1 December 1937 (age 88) San Marino, San Marino

Sport
- Sport: Sports shooting

Guglielmo Giusti (born 1 December 1937) is a Sammarinese former sports shooter. He competed at the 1960 Summer Olympics and the 1972 Summer Olympics.
