= Daniela Del Din =

Sammarinese professional sport shooter

Personal information
- Nationality: San Marino
- Born: 29 September 1969 (age 56) San Marino, San Marino
- Height: 1.73 m (5 ft 8 in)
- Weight: 68 kg (150 lb)

Sport
- Sport: Shooting
- Event: Trap
Medal record
Women's shooting
Representing San Marino
Mediterranean Games
Gold medal – first place	2009 Pescara	Trap
Silver medal – second place	2005 Almería	Trap
World Championships
Bronze medal – third place	2007 Nicosia	Trap

Daniela Del Din (born September 29, 1969, in San Marino) is a Sammarinese professional sport shooter. She won the bronze medal at the 2007 ISSF World Shooting Championships in Nicosia, Cyprus, and in 2009, she captured her first gold in trap shooting at the ISSF World Cup in Cairo, Egypt, defeating junior world champion Jessica Rossi of Italy. She also won two medals for the same category at the Mediterranean Games.

== Background ==
Del Din started shooting as her sporting discipline at the age of 16. She first competed for San Marino at the 1989 ISSF World Shooting Championships in Montecatini, Italy, where she placed fourth in trap shooting. Shortly after the championships, Del Din relinquished the sport to focus on her personal life and career as an accountant.

=== Leaving retirement ===
In 2005, Del Din finally came out of retirement, when she captured her first medal in trap shooting at the Mediterranean Games in Almería, Spain. Two years later, she was ranked number three in the world by ISSF, after winning silver and bronze medals at the ISSF World Shooting Championships in Nicosia, Cyprus, and at the final ISSF World Cup in Belgrade, Serbia, respectively. She also scored 68 points at the fourth meet of the World Cup in Maribor, Slovenia, finishing only in thirteenth place. Her top-level success at the shooting competitions allowed Del Din to qualify for the Olympics. The following year, Del Din added her second silver medal at the World Cup in Suhl, Germany, finishing behind Rossi by just a single point in the final.

At age thirty-seven, Del Din made her official debut for the 2008 Summer Olympics in Beijing, where she became the nation's first female flag bearer in the opening ceremony. Del Din competed for the women's trap shooting, where she placed fifteenth out of the twenty shooters in the qualifying rounds, behind France's Delphine Racinet by three targets in the final attempt, with a total score of 62 points.

== Successes ==
In 2009, Del Din had won her first ever gold medal for trap shooting at the Mediterranean Games in Pescara, Italy, and anchored her teammate Alessandra Perilli for a two-medal sweep in the podium. Few months, she won her second gold at the ISSF World Cup in Cairo, Egypt, with a remarkable hit of 70 qualifying and 19 final hits, for a total of 89 targets.
