= Michele Piva =

Sammarinese swimmer

Personal information
- Born: 1 September 1965 (age 60)

Sport
- Sport: Swimming

Michele Piva (born 1 September 1965) is a Sammarinese swimmer. He competed at the 1984 Summer Olympics and the 1988 Summer Olympics.
