= Daniele Cesaretti =

Sammarinese cyclist

Personal information
- Born: 19 April 1954 (age 72) San Marino, San Marino

Cycling career
- Sport: Cycling

Daniele Cesaretti (born 19 April 1954) is a Sammarinese former cyclist. He competed at the 1972 Summer Olympics and the 1976 Summer Olympics.
