= Francesco Amici =

Sammarinese sport shooter (born 1960)

Personal information
- Born: 5 February 1960 (age 66)
Medal record
Men's shooting
Representing San Marino
Games of the Small States of Europe
Gold medal – first place	2003 Malta	Trap

Francesco Amici (born 5 February 1960) is a Sammarinese sport shooter who specializes in the trap. He has competed at four Olympic games.

At the 2004 Olympic Games he finished in joint ninth place in the trap qualification, missing a place among the top six, who progressed to the final round. Amici also won two medals at World championships (an individual one in 1995 and as a team member in 2010) and two individual medals at World Cup events (in 1995 and 2008).

Olympic results
Event	1992	1996	2000	2004
Trap (mixed)	21st 142+46	Not held		
Trap (men)	Not held	31st 118	32nd 106	9th 119
