= Alessandra Perilli =

Sammarinese sport shooter (born 1988)

Personal information
- Nationality: Italian; Sammarinese (since 2009)
- Born: 1 April 1988 (age 38) Rimini, Italy
- Height: 169 cm (5 ft 7 in)
- Weight: 73 kg (161 lb)

Sport
- Country: San Marino
- Sport: Shooting
- Event: Trap
Medal record
Women's Shooting
Representing San Marino
Olympic Games
Silver medal – second place	2020 Tokyo	Mixed team trap
Bronze medal – third place	2020 Tokyo	Trap
World Championships
Bronze medal – third place	2009 Maribor	Trap team
Bronze medal – third place	2010 Munich	Trap team
Silver medal – second place	2025 Athens	Mixed team trap
ISSF World Cup Final
Gold medal – first place	2015 Nicosia	Trap
Silver medal – second place	2016 Rome	Trap
Gold medal – first place	2024 New Delhi	Trap
Silver medal – second place	2025 Doha	Trap
European Championships
Bronze medal – third place	2019 Lonato	Trap
Bronze medal – third place	2024 Lonato	Mixed team trap
European Games
Bronze medal – third place	2015 Baku	Mixed team trap
Mediterranean Games
Bronze medal – third place	2009 Pescara	Trap
Bronze medal – third place	2013 Mersin	Trap
Gold medal – first place	2018 Tarragona	Trap
Bronze medal – third place	2026 Taranto	Trap
Games of the Small States of Europe
Silver medal – second place	2009 Cyprus	Trap
Gold medal – first place	2025 Andorra	Trap
European Junior Championships
Bronze medal – third place	2008 Nicosia	Trap

Alessandra Perilli (born 1 April 1988) is a Sammarinese trap shooter. Born in Rimini, Italy, she competed for Italy at youth level before switching to San Marino, her mother's country, in 2009.

Perilli finished fourth in women's trap at the 2012 Summer Olympics after a shoot-off for the medals, which at the time was San Marino's best Olympic result. At the 2020 Summer Olympics in Tokyo she won bronze in women's trap, the first Olympic medal in San Marino's history and one that made it the least populous nation to win an Olympic medal. Two days later, she won silver in the mixed team trap with Gian Marco Berti.

She has also won the ISSF World Cup Final twice, in 2015 and 2024, along with four World Cup events, gold at the 2018 Mediterranean Games and bronze at the 2026 Mediterranean Games, and silver with Berti in mixed team trap at the 2025 World Championships. She has competed at four Olympic Games and carried San Marino's flag at the 2012 opening and closing ceremonies and the 2016 closing ceremony.

== Biography ==
Alessandra Perilli was born in Rimini, Italy on 1 April 1988. Her father, Claudio Perilli, was an Italian champion in Olympic trap and a long-time member of the Italian national team. Her elder sister, Arianna Perilli, was the first of the two to take up trap, and was selected for Italy at the age of 15 for the 1991 European Championships in Bologna. Arianna went on to represent both Italy and San Marino and won the 2017 European Championship. Alessandra was introduced to shooting by her father and took it up as a teenager. (Note: Sources differ on the year: CNN gives 2001, while the ISSF gives 2003 and the San Marino Olympic Committee says she began at the age of 15.)

She began competing in 2007 and represented Italy at youth level. Her first international medal was a bronze in junior women's trap at the 2008 European Championships in Nicosia. In 2009 she took sporting citizenship of San Marino, her mother's homeland.

== Shooting career ==
=== Early career and 2012 Olympics ===
Perilli made her competitive debut for San Marino at the 2009 Games of the Small States of Europe in Cyprus, winning silver. Later that year she won bronze at the 2009 Mediterranean Games in Pescara. In San Marino in 2009, she won her first World Cup medal, taking silver after a shoot-off against China's Lu Xingyu. It was the first time she had reached a World Cup final; she had led the competition after qualification. At the 2009 World Championships in Maribor she finished fourth in the individual event and helped San Marino to bronze in the women's team trap. She was part of the San Marino team that took bronze in the women's team trap at the 2010 World Championships in Munich.

In 2011 she won World Cup events in Concepción and Sydney, results that earnt her a place at the London Olympics. In the Sydney final in March she scored 89 out of 100, placing her ahead of Italy's Jessica Rossi.

Perilli was San Marino's flag bearer at both the opening and closing ceremonies of the 2012 Summer Olympics. In the women's trap she qualified fifth with 71 and scored 22 in the final, finishing in a three-way tie for second place. She lost the shoot-off for the medals to France's Delphine Réau and Slovakia's Zuzana Štefečeková and placed fourth. She became the first Sammarinese athlete in any sport to finish in the top four at an Olympic Games, bettering Francesco Nanni's fifth place in the 50-metre rifle prone at the 1984 Summer Olympics. It was San Marino's best Olympic result up to that point. She later described the result as bitter, and said she had considered giving up the sport after the Olympics.

=== 2013–2019 ===
Perilli won bronze at the 2013 Mediterranean Games in Mersin. Between 2013 and 2014 she spent seven months away from the sport while pregnant with her son. In 2014 she won bronze at the World Cup in Munich. Silver at the Al Ain World Cup in 2015 secured her a quota place for the 2016 Summer Olympics. That year she also won bronze in the mixed team trap with Manuel Mancini at the inaugural 2015 European Games in Baku. She ended the season by winning the World Cup Final in Nicosia.

She took silver at the 2016 World Cup Final in Rome. At the 2016 Rio Olympics she placed 16th in qualification with 63 and did not reach the final. Her sister Arianna also competed in the event for San Marino and finished 13th with 65. Il Fatto Quotidiano attributed Alessandra's result to nerves. She carried San Marino's flag at the closing ceremony.

In 2017 she won World Cup bronzes in Acapulco and Larnaca. The same year she won a mixed team bronze with Gian Marco Berti at the World Cup in Cyprus. In 2018 she scored a world record of 122 out of 125 in qualification at the Changwon World Cup, where she went on to win bronze, and that summer she won gold at the 2018 Mediterranean Games in Tarragona. In 2019 she and Berti won the mixed team event at the Lahti World Cup. Her bronze at the 2019 European Shooting Championships in Lonato del Garda earned her a place at the 2020 Tokyo Olympics. Later in 2019, she finished fourth at the World Championships, also held in Lonato.

=== 2020–2021: Tokyo Olympics ===
In 2020 Perilli won silver at the World Cup in Nicosia, and she reached first place in the women's trap world ranking that year. In 2021, with the Olympics having been postponed by a year, she won the women's trap and took silver in the mixed team with Berti at the Lonato del Garda World Cup.

She was one of five athletes in San Marino's team in Tokyo. Her preparation for the Games was supported by an Olympic Solidarity scholarship from the International Olympic Committee, which provides monthly grants towards training, travel and qualification costs for athletes from smaller National Olympic Committees. She qualified for the final of the women's trap with 122. In the final on 29 July 2021 she led until the 13th target, dropped to fourth, then moved back onto the podium after three misses by Australia's Laetisha Scanlan. She later said that when the fifth-placed shooter was eliminated, she resolved not to finish fourth again. She eventually finished third behind Slovakia's Zuzana Rehák-Štefečeková and Kayle Browning of the United States. It was San Marino's first Olympic medal in 61 years of competing at the Games. It also saw San Marino become the least populous nation to win an Olympic medal. The Sammarinese website InsiderSM subsequently described her as a legend of the country's sport. Perilli thanked her coach, Luca Di Mari, and described the medal as a team effort. Perilli dedicated the medal to her family, her partner and her son, and said she was already thinking about the Paris 2024 Olympics.

Two days later, Perilli and Berti reached the gold medal match of the first Olympic mixed team trap event. The pair narrowly lost to Spain's Fátima Gálvez and Alberto Fernández, so took silver. Berti became the first Sammarinese man to win an Olympic medal.

=== 2022–2024 Paris Olympics qualification and participation ===
Perilli later said that the celebrations in San Marino after the Tokyo Olympics went on for months and that the parties eventually became very tiring. Qualification for the 2024 Paris Olympics began at the 2022 European Championships in Larnaca, where she placed 24th. At the 2023 World Championships in Baku, she finished sixth. At the 2023 European Games in Kraków she was eliminated in a semi-final shoot-off, and placed fifth.

The 2024 season saw her gain medals in World Cup events, with bronze in Cairo and silver in Rabat. At the European Championships in Lonato in May, she and Berti won bronze in the mixed team, taking the bronze medal match against Turkey on a golden hit. The last individual quota places for Paris were awarded on 9 June 2024 from the ISSF's final Qualification Ranking for the Olympic Games, going to the highest-ranked athletes in each event who had not already qualified. Perilli was sixth in the women's trap ranking, and the athletes above her had already secured places, so the trap quota went to her. Her World Cup medals in Cairo and Rabat that spring had helped lift her ranking. On 27 June she was confirmed in San Marino's five-member team, for her fourth Olympic Games.

The women's trap competition was held at Châteauroux on 30 and 31 July 2024. She ended the first day 19th of 30 on 69 out of 75, four targets outside the six final places. She finished qualification on 116 out of 125 and placed 15th, missing the final.

=== Recent career ===
Perilli won the World Cup Final in New Delhi in October 2024, ahead of Italy's Erica Sessa and Turkey's Safiye Temizdemir. It was her second World Cup Final title, nine years after her first. Afterwards she described shooting as her life and passion, and said she intended to compete at the 2028 Summer Olympics in Los Angeles. She explained that she organised each day around the sport, planning her meals and sleep and adjusting for time zones, because everything had to be perfect.

She won bronze at the World Cup in Nicosia in May 2025. Later that month, she became champion of the Games of the Small States of Europe in Andorra, beating Cyprus's Annita Koukkoulli 38–36 in the final. After finishing fourth at the European Championships in Châteauroux, she placed 16th in the individual event at the World Championships. In the mixed team event, she and Berti progressed from a four-way shoot-off to reach the gold medal match. They lost 40–45 to Italy's Massimo Fabbrizi and Alessia Iezzi, to take silver.

In December 2025 she competed as defending champion at the World Cup Final, in Doha, and qualified fourth with 117. She led Italy's Silvana Stanco late in the final, but missed two of her last targets and the pair finished level on 26. Stanco won the shoot-off, meaning that Perilli took silver.

During the 2026 World Cup season, she and Berti finished fifth in the mixed team both in Hangzhou and in Lonato. Perilli was selected for San Marino's team at the 2026 Mediterranean Games in Taranto, where she qualified for the final in a shoot-off, and went on to win bronze. It was her fourth Mediterranean Games medal, seventeen years after her first in Pescara.

== Personal life ==
As of 2021, Perilli lived in Borgo Maggiore, San Marino. She is married, with the surname Perilli-Pinotti, and has a son born in 2014. She has studied hospitality management. Outside shooting, she works with the police. She shoots right-handed with a dominant left eye. Luca Di Mari is both her personal and national coach. She has named her sister Arianna as one of her sporting heroes.

== Awards ==
- San Marino Sport Awards, Athlete of the Year: 2011, 2012, 2015, 2020, 2021 (shared with Gian Marco Berti and Myles Amine)
- San Marino Sport Awards, Team of the Year: 2025 (mixed team trap, with Gian Marco Berti)
- Fair Play Menarini Hall of Fame, "Sport promotion" category (2022)

== Notes ==
Olympic Games
Preceded by Daniela Del Din	Flagbearer for San Marino; London 2012	Succeeded by Arianna Perilli
