= Sammarinese National Olympic Committee =

National Olympic Committee

- Country: San Marino
- [[|]]
- Code: SMR
- Created: 1959
- Recognized: 1959
- Continental Association: EOC
- Headquarters: Serravalle, San Marino
- President: Gian Primo Giardi
- Secretary General: Eros Bologna
- Website: www.cons.sm

The Sammarinese National Olympic Committee (Italian: Comitato Olimpico Nazionale Sammarinese; IOC Code: SMR) is the National Olympic Committee representing San Marino.

The committee was recognised by the International Olympic Committee in 1959. As of February 2024, its president is Gian Primo Giardi.

== See also ==
- San Marino at the Olympics
