= United States at the 1988 Winter Olympics =

- Flag of the United States
- IOC code: USA
- NOC: United States Olympic Committee

in Calgary
- Competitors: 118 in 6 sports
- Flag bearer: Lyle Nelson (biathlon)
- Medals Ranked 9th: Gold 2 Silver 1 Bronze 3 Total 6

Winter Olympics appearances (overview)
- 1924; 1928; 1932; 1936; 1948; 1952; 1956; 1960; 1964; 1968; 1972; 1976; 1980; 1984; 1988; 1992; 1994; 1998; 2002; 2006; 2010; 2014; 2018; 2022; 2026

The United States competed at the 1988 Winter Olympics in Calgary, Alberta, Canada.

== Medalists ==
The following U.S. competitors won medals at the games. In the by discipline sections below, medalists' names are bolded.

Medal	Name	Sport	Event	Date
Gold	Brian Boitano	Figure skating	Men's singles	February 20
Gold	Bonnie Blair	Speed skating	Women's 500 meters	February 22
Silver	Eric Flaim	Speed skating	Men's 1500 meters	February 20
Bronze	Peter Oppegard; Jill Watson	Figure skating	Pairs	February 16
Bronze	Bonnie Blair	Speed skating	Women's 1000 meters	February 26
Bronze	Debi Thomas	Figure skating	Women's singles	February 27

Multiple medalists
Name	Sport	1st place, gold medalist(s)	2nd place, silver medalist(s)	3rd place, bronze medalist(s)	Total
Bonnie Blair	Speed skating	1	0	1	**2**

== Competitors ==
The following is the list of number of competitors in the Games.

Sport	Men	Women	Total
Alpine skiing	9	8	17
Biathlon	5	–	5
Bobsleigh	9	–	9
Cross-country skiing	6	5	11
Figure skating	9	8	17
Ice hockey	22	–	22
Luge	7	3	10
Nordic combined	4	–	4
Ski jumping	6	–	6
Speed skating	10	7	17
Total	87	31	118

== Alpine skiing ==
Timed events
Men

Athlete	Event	Run 1		Run 2		Total	
Athlete	Event	Time	Rank	Time	Rank	Time	Rank
Bill Hudson	Downhill	—N/a				DNF	
A. J. Kitt	Downhill	—N/a				2:04.94	26
Doug Lewis	Downhill	—N/a				2:06.25	32
Jeff Olson	Downhill	—N/a				2:05.09	28
Bill Hudson	Super-G	—N/a				1:47.29	30
A. J. Kitt	Super-G	—N/a				DSQ	
Jeff Olson	Super-G	—N/a				1:45.56	24
Tiger Shaw	Super-G	—N/a				1:44.26	18
Felix McGrath	Giant slalom	1:06.79	16	1:03.81	13	2:10.60	13
Jack Miller	Giant slalom	DNF					
Bob Ormsby	Giant slalom	1:10.07	39	1:05.78	29	2:15.85	34
Tiger Shaw	Giant slalom	1:06.71	14	1:03.52	12	2:10.23	12
Felix McGrath	Slalom	DNF					
Jack Miller	Slalom	55.00	24	DNF			
Bob Ormsby	Slalom	DSQ					
Alex Williams	Slalom	DNF					

Women

Athlete	Event	Run 1		Run 2		Total	
Athlete	Event	Time	Rank	Time	Rank	Time	Rank
Pam Fletcher	Downhill	—N/a				DNS	
Kristin Krone	Downhill	—N/a				1:29.13	20
Hilary Lindh	Downhill	—N/a				DNF	
Edith Thys	Downhill	—N/a				1:28.53	18
Debbie Armstrong	Super-G	—N/a				1:21.87	18
Kristin Krone	Super-G	—N/a				1:24.51	32
Hilary Lindh	Super-G	—N/a				1:23.11	26
Edith Thys	Super-G	—N/a				1:20.93	9
Debbie Armstrong	Giant slalom	1:01.73	17	1:08.99	13	2:10.72	13
Tamara McKinney	Giant slalom	DNF					
Diann Roffe	Giant slalom	1:01.75	18	1:08.94	12	2:10.69	12
Heidi Voelker	Giant slalom	1:02.10	20	DNF			
Beth Madsen	Slalom	51.09	17	50.09	11	1:41.18	11
Tamara McKinney	Slalom	DNF					
Diann Roffe	Slalom	51.74	22	51.14	14	1:42.88	15
Heidi Voelker	Slalom	DNF					

Combined
Men

Athlete	Event	Downhill		Slalom				Total	
Athlete	Event	Time	Points	Time 1	Time 2	Total	Points	Points	Rank
Bill Hudson	Combined	DNF							
A. J. Kitt	Combined	1:50.42	38.85	56.95	DNF				
Felix McGrath	Combined	1:53.35	71.19	DNF					
Jeff Olson	Combined	DNF							

Women

Athlete	Event	Downhill		Slalom				Total	
Athlete	Event	Time	Points	Time 1	Time 2	Total	Points	Points	Rank
Kristin Krone	Combined	1:18.80	36.11	44.94	45.25	1:30.19	78.70	114.81	17
Hilary Lindh	Combined	1:19.27	43.36	46.96	48.35	1:35.31	121.20	164.57	23
Beth Madsen	Combined	1:21.31	74.84	41.86	42.92	1:24.78	33.79	108.64	15
Edith Thys	Combined	1:18.38	29.63	DNF					

== Biathlon ==
Athlete	Event	Time	Misses	Rank
Darin Binning	Individual	1:03:54.8	4	42
Bill Carow	Individual	1:05:10.1	5	49
Curt Schreiner	Individual	1:05:22.7	5	52
Josh Thompson	Individual	1:01:29.4	5	25
Bill Carow	Sprint	28:19.6	4 (1+3)	49
Lyle Nelson	Sprint	27:34.3	1 (0+1)	30
Curt Schreiner	Sprint	28:19.9	3 (2+1)	50
Josh Thompson	Sprint	27:27.7	4 (2+2)	27
Darin Binning; Lyle Nelson; Curt Schreiner; Josh Thompson	Relay	1:29:33.0	2	9

== Bobsleigh ==
Athlete	Event	Run 1		Run 2		Run 3		Run 4		Total	
Athlete	Event	Time	Rank	Time	Rank	Time	Rank	Time	Rank	Time	Rank
Brent Rushlaw; Mike Aljoe	Two-man	59.01	25	1:00.13	17	1:00.96	16	DNF			
Matt Roy; Jim Herberich	Two-man	59.37	29	1:00.06	15	1:00.34	10	59.57	11	3:59.34	16
Brent Rushlaw; Hal Hoye; Mike Wasko; Bill White	Four-man	56.72	4	57.67	8	56.69	9	57.20	1	3:48.28	4
Brian Shimer; Jim Herberich; Matt Roy; Scott Pladel	Four-man	57.17	12	58.49	19	57.47	19	58.10	13	3:51.23	16

== Cross-country skiing ==
Men

Athlete	Event	Time	Rank
Todd Boonstra	15 km classical	47:21.8	53
Joe Galanes	15 km classical	48:05.2	58
Dan Simoneau	15 km classical	44:53.8	29
Bill Spencer	15 km classical	45:59.6	40
Kevin Brochman	30 km classical	1:37:07.1	56
Jon Engen	30 km classical	1:35:41.9	51
Joe Galanes	30 km classical	DNF	
Dan Simoneau	30 km classical	1:35:21.4	49
Kevin Brochman	50 km freestyle	2:19:45.5	47
Jon Engen	50 km freestyle	DNF	
Dan Simoneau	50 km freestyle	DNF	
Bill Spencer	50 km freestyle	2:25:22.6	56
Todd Boonstra; Dan Simoneau; Bill Spencer; Joe Galanes	4×10 km relay	1:50:27.6	13

Women

Athlete	Event	Time	Rank
Leslie Bancroft-Krichko	5 km classical	16:31.1	31
Nancy Fiddler	5 km classical	17:05.4	41
Leslie Thompson	5 km classical	16:58.5	39
Betsy Youngman	5 km classical	17:32.6	47
Leslie Bancroft-Krichko	10 km classical	33:25.1	36
Dorcas DenHartog-Wonsavage	10 km classical	34:26.1	40
Nancy Fiddler	10 km classical	34:31.1	41
Leslie Thompson	10 km classical	35:17.7	45
Dorcas DenHartog-Wonsavage	20 km freestyle	1:00:48.6	23
Nancy Fiddler	20 km freestyle	1:03:57.5	43
Leslie Thompson	20 km freestyle	1:01:04.1	25
Betsy Youngman	20 km freestyle	1:03:31.3	42
Leslie Bancroft-Krichko; Dorcas DanHartog-Wonsavage; Nancy Fiddler; Leslie Thompson	4×5 km relay	1:04:08.8	8

== Figure skating ==
Individual

Athlete	Event	CF	SP	FS	Total	
Athlete	Event	Rank	Rank	Rank	TFP	Rank
**Brian Boitano**	Men's singles	2	2	1	3.0	1st place, gold medalist(s)
Christopher Bowman	Men's singles	8	5	7	13.8	7
Paul Wylie	Men's singles	12	8	9	19.4	10
Caryn Kadavy	Ladies's singles	7	5	DNS	DNF	
Jill Trenary	Ladies's singles	5	6	5	10.4	4
**Debi Thomas**	Ladies's singles	2	2	4	6.0	3rd place, bronze medalist(s)

Mixed

Athlete	Event	CD	SP / OD	FS / FD	Total	
Athlete	Event	Rank	Rank	Rank	TFP	Rank
Natalie Seybold; Wayne Seybold	Pairs	—N/a	10	10	15.0	10
Gillian Wachsman; Todd Waggoner	Pairs	—N/a	4	5	7.0	5
**Jill Watson**; **Peter Oppegard**	Pairs	—N/a	3	3	4.5	3rd place, bronze medalist(s)
Suzanne Semanick; Scott Gregory	Ice dancing	6	6	6	12.0	6
Susan Wynne; Joseph Druar	Ice dancing	11	11	11	22.0	11

== Ice hockey ==
Summary

Team	Event	First round						Consolation game	Final round			
Team	Event	Opposition Score	Opposition Score	Opposition Score	Opposition Score	Opposition Score	Rank	Opposition Score	Opposition Score	Opposition Score	Opposition Score	Rank
United States men's	Men's tournament	Austria; **W** 10–6	Czechoslovakia; **L** 5–7	Soviet Union; **L** 5–7	Norway; **W** 6–3	West Germany; **L** 1–4	4	7th place game Switzerland; **W** 8–4	did not advance			7

Roster

- Scott Fusco
- Corey Millen
- Greg Brown
- Guy Gosselin
- Clark Donatelli
- Jim Johannson
- Peter Laviolette
- Scott Young
- Brian Leetch
- Mike Richter
- Jeff Norton
- Eric Weinrich
- Dave Snuggerud
- Allen Bourbeau
- Kevin Stevens
- Tony Granato
- Craig Janney
- Steve Leach
- Lane MacDonald
- Kevin Miller
- Todd Okerlund
- Chris Terreri
- Dave Peterson (Head coach)

First round

Team	Pld	W	L	D	GF	GA	GD	Pts
Soviet Union	5	5	0	0	32	10	+22	10
West Germany	5	4	1	0	19	12	+7	8
Czechoslovakia	5	3	2	0	23	14	+9	6
United States	5	2	3	0	27	27	0	4
Austria	5	0	4	1	12	29	−17	1
Norway	5	0	4	1	11	32	−21	1

Source: HockeyCanada.ca

13 February 1988	**United States**	**10–6**	Austria

15 February 1988	**Czechoslovakia**	**7–5**	United States

17 February 1988	**Soviet Union**	**7–5**	United States

19 February 1988	**United States**	**6–3**	Norway

21 February 1988	**West Germany**	**4–1**	United States

7th place game

25 February 1988	**United States**	**8–4**	Switzerland

== Luge ==
Men

Athlete	Event	Run 1		Run 2		Run 3		Run 4		Total	
Athlete	Event	Time	Rank	Time	Rank	Time	Rank	Time	Rank	Time	Rank
Duncan Kennedy	Singles	47.032	16	47.065	16	47.093	15	47.282	16	3:08.472	14
Frank Masley	Singles	46.813	11	46.890	9	46.813	8	47.427	18	3:07.943	12
Jon Owen	Singles	47.670	25	47.632	23	47.834	25	48.328	28	3:11.464	23
Joe Barile; Steven Maher	Doubles	46.262	10	48.701	17	—N/a				1:34.963	16
Timothy Nardiello; Miro Zajonc	Doubles	46.482	13	46.838	11	—N/a				1:33.320	11

Women

Athlete	Event	Run 1		Run 2		Run 3		Run 4		Total	
Athlete	Event	Time	Rank	Time	Rank	Time	Rank	Time	Rank	Time	Rank
Cammy Myler	Singles	46.502	8	46.888	9	46.828	12	46.617	8	3:06.835	9
Erica Terwillegar	Singles	46.506	9	47.300	15	46.780	10	46.705	10	3:07.291	11
Bonny Warner	Singles	46.409	6	46.643	8	46.633	7	46.371	5	3:06.211	6

== Nordic combined ==
Athlete	Event	Ski Jumping					Cross-country		Total	
Athlete	Event	Jump 1	Jump 2	Jump 3	Total	Rank	Time	Rank	Time	Rank
Gary Crawford	Individual	~~55.4~~	65.2	70.6	135.8	43	43:54.7	41	54:12.7	41
Joe Holland	Individual	101.8	~~96.4~~	108.6	210.4	9	41:01.8	28	43:02.5	19
Todd Wilson	Individual	88.2	91.9	~~78.1~~	180.1	37	42:07.9	39	47:30.6	40
Joe Holland; Hans Johnstone; Todd Wilson	Team	—N/a			516.9	9	1:23:42.9	10	1:33:06.9	10

== Ski jumping ==
Athlete	Event	Jump 1		Jump 2		Total	
Athlete	Event	Distance	Points	Distance	Points	Points	Rank
Mike Holland	Normal hill	79.5	92.8	74.5	81.8	174.6	33
Mark Konopacke	Normal hill	83.5	100.2	79.0	88.0	188.2	18
Dennis McGrane	Normal hill	78.0	90.4	73.0	79.4	169.8	43
Rick Mewborn	Normal hill	75.0	80.1	74.0	78.5	158.6	54
Chris Hastings	Large hill	94.0	74.0	93.0	71.1	145.1	49
Mike Holland	Large hill	105.0	96.9	92.0	73.7	170.6	32
Mark Konopacke	Large hill	100.0	83.9	96.0	76.3	160.2	42
Ted Langlois	Large hill	95.0	75.9	90.0	66.9	142.8	50
Mike Holland; Mark Konopacke; Ted Langlois; Dennis McGrane	Team	—N/a	259.3	—N/a	237.5	496.8	10

== Speed skating ==
Men

Athlete	Event	Time	Rank
Erik Henriksen	500 m	37.50	15
Dan Jansen	500 m	DNF	
Marty Pierce	500 m	37.76	22
Nick Thometz	500 m	37.16	8
Tom Cushman	1000 m	1:14.68	17
Eric Flaim	1000 m	1:13.53	4
Dan Jansen	1000 m	DNF	
Nick Thometz	1000 m	1:14.71	18
John Baskfield	1500 m	1:55.88	20
**Eric Flaim**	1500 m	1:52.12	2nd place, silver medalist(s)
Mark Greenwald	1500 m	1:54.64	11
Dave Silk	1500 m	1:55.26	15
Erick Flaim	5000 m	6:47.09	4
Mark Greenwald	5000 m	6:51.98	9
Dave Silk	5000 m	6:49.95	6
Eric Flaim	10,000 m	14:05.57	4
Jeff Klaiber	10,000 m	14:38.60	25
Dave Silk	10,000 m	14:25.56	14

Women

Athlete	Event	Time	Rank
Leslie Bader	500 m	41.57	23
**Bonnie Blair**	500 m	39.10 **WR**	1st place, gold medalist(s)
Katie Class	500 m	40.91	12
Kristen Talbot	500 m	41.71	25
Leslie Bader	1000 m	1:21.09	7
**Bonnie Blair**	1000 m	1:18.31	3rd place, bronze medalist(s)
Katie Class	1000 m	1:21.10	8
Nancy Swider-Peltz	1000 m	1:24.81	24
Leslie Bader	1500 m	2:05.53	10
Bonnie Blair	1500 m	2:04.02	4
Katie Class	1500 m	2:07.30	13
Janet Goldman	1500 m	2:08.72	18
Leslie Bader	3000 m	4:30.09	20
Mary Docter	3000 m	4:29.93	19
Janet Goldman	3000 m	4:25.26	11
Mary Docter	5000 m	7:37.00	11
Janet Goldman	5000 m	7:36.98	10
Nancy Swider-Peltz	5000 m	7:52.12	22
