= Speed skating at the 1988 Winter Olympics – Women's 1500 metres =

Women's 1500 metres at the XV Olympic Winter Games
- Pictogram for speed skating
- Venue: Olympic Oval
- Dates: February 27, 1988
- Competitors: 28 from 13 nations
- Winning time: 2:00.68

Medalists
1st place, gold medalist(s)		Yvonne van Gennip; Netherlands
2nd place, silver medalist(s)		Karin Kania; East Germany
3rd place, bronze medalist(s)		Andrea Ehrig; East Germany

The women's 1500 metres in speed skating at the 1988 Winter Olympics took place on February 27, at the Olympic Oval.

== Records ==
Prior to this competition, the existing world and Olympic records were as follows:

World record	Karin Kania (GDR)	1:59.30	Alma-Ata, Kazakh SSR, Soviet Union	22 March 1986
Olympic record	Karin Kania (GDR)	2:03.42	Sarajevo, Yugoslavia	9 February 1984

The following new World and Olympic records were set during the competition.

Date	Athlete	Country	Time	OR	WR
27 February	Andrea Ehrig	East Germany	2:01.49	OR	
27 February	Karin Kania	East Germany	2:00.82	OR	
27 February	Yvonne van Gennip	Netherlands	2:00.68	OR	

== Results ==
Constanze Moser-Scandolo was about to start for the East German team when she had to pull out due to injury; she won the World Allround Speed Skating Championships for Women in the following year.

The following are the results of the competitors:

Rank	Athlete	Country	Time	Behind	Notes
1st place, gold medalist(s)	Yvonne van Gennip	Netherlands	2:00.68	–	OR
2nd place, silver medalist(s)	Karin Kania	East Germany	2:00.82	+0.14	
3rd place, bronze medalist(s)	Andrea Ehrig	East Germany	2:01.49	+0.81	
4	Bonnie Blair	United States	2:04.02	+3.34	
5	Yelena Lapuga	Soviet Union	2:04.24	+3.56	
6	Seiko Hashimoto	Japan	2:04.38	+3.70	
7	Gunda Kleeman	East Germany	2:04.68	+4.00	
7	Erwina Ryś-Ferens	Poland	2:04.68	+4.00	
9	Song Hwa-son	North Korea	2:05.25	+4.57	
10	Leslie Bader	United States	2:05.53	+4.85	
11	Natalie Grenier	Canada	2:06.80	+6.12	
12	Marieke Stam	Netherlands	2:07.00	+6.32	
13	Katie Class	United States	2:07.30	+6.95	
14	Ariane Loignon	Canada	2:07.63	+7.03	
15	Yelena Tumanova	Soviet Union	2:07.71	+7.03	
16	Anja Mischke	West Germany	2:08.52	+7.84	
17	Zofia Tokarczyk	Poland	2:08.54	+7.86	
18	Jane Goldman	United States	2:08.72	+8.04	
19	Natsue Seki	Japan	2:08.89	+8.21	
20	Edel Therese Høiseth	Norway	2:09.34	+8.66	
21	Chantal Côté	Canada	2:09.62	+8.94	
22	Han Chun-ok	North Korea	2:09.66	+8.98	
23	Caroline Maheux	Canada	2:10.83	+10.15	
24	Kim Young-ok	South Korea	2:11.95	+11.27	
25	Minna Nystedt	Norway	2:12.40	+11.72	
26	Choi Hye-sook	South Korea	2:12.96	+12.28	
27	Stéphanie Dumont	France	2:13.01	+12.33	
28	Bibija Kerla	Yugoslavia	2:21.69	+21.01	
