= 1987 World Allround Speed Skating Championships for women =

International speed skating competition

1987 World Allround Speed Skating Championships for Women
- Venue: Wisconsin State Fair Park, West Allis, Wisconsin, United States
- Dates: 7–8 February
- Competitors: 32 from 15 nations

Medalist women
1st place, gold medalist(s)		Karin Kania-Enke	DDR
2nd place, silver medalist(s)		Andrea Schöne-Mitscherlich	DDR
3rd place, bronze medalist(s)		Yvonne van Gennip	NED

The 48th edition of the World Allround Speed Skating Championships for Women took place on 7 and 8 February 1987 in West Allis at the Wisconsin State Fair Park ice rink.

Title holder was Andrea Schöne-Mitscherlich from East Germany.

== Distance medalists ==
Event	Gold (gold)	Silver (silver)	Bronze (bronze)
500m	Karin Kania-Enke	Jacqueline Börner	Katie Class
3000m	Andrea Schöne-Mitscherlich	Karin Kania-Enke	Yvonne van Gennip
1500m	Karin Kania-Enke	Andrea Schöne-Mitscherlich	Yvonne van Gennip
5000m	Andrea Schöne-Mitscherlich	Karin Kania-Enke	Yvonne van Gennip

== Classification ==
Rank	Skater	Country	Points Samalog	500m	3000m	1500m	5000m
1st place, gold medalist(s)	Karin Kania-Enke	East Germany	176.721	41.38 (gold)	4:32.16 (2)	2:08.90 (gold)	7:50.15 (2)
2nd place, silver medalist(s)	Andrea Schöne-Mitscherlich	East Germany	177.358	42.11 (5)	4:30.10 (gold)	2:10.61 (2)	7:46.96 (gold)
3rd place, bronze medalist(s)	Yvonne van Gennip	Netherlands	180.384	42.90 (11)	4:37.33 (3)	2:11.81 (3)	7:53.27 (3)
4	Seiko Hashimoto	Japan	181.557	42.40 (7)	4:39.78 (4)	2:12.36 (4)	8:04.07 (6)
5	Jacqueline Börner	East Germany	182.535	41.81 (2)	4:43.88 (7)	2:14.23 (5)	8:06.69 (7)
6	Marieke Stam	Netherlands	184.529	42.45 (8)	4:48.40 (12)	2:15.08 (6)	8:09.87 (8)
7	Natalja Artamonova-Koerova	Soviet Union	185.036	42.73 (9)	4:42.98 (6)	2:15.49 (7)	8:19.80 (11)
8	Heike Schalling	East Germany	185.926	44.90 (27)	4:40.44 (5)	2:17.64 (12)	8:04.06 (5)
9	Emese Nemeth-Hunyady	Austria	186.797	42.77 (10)	4:47.76 (9)	2:18.81 (14)	8:17.97 (9)
10	Wang Xiuli	China	186.847	42.11 (5)	4:51.17 (17)	2:17.31 (10)	8:24.39 (14)
11	Petra Moolhuizen	Netherlands	186.925	43.76 (15)	4:44.37 (8)	2:17.05 (9)	8:20.87 (12)
12	Yelena Lapuga	Soviet Union	186.998	43.82 (16)	4:49.54 (15)	2:19.78 (17)	8:03.29 (4)
13	Leslie Bader	United States	188.055	43.32 (13)	4:47.90 (11)	2:19.06 (16)	8:23.99 (13)
14	Zhang Qing	China	188.974	44.12 (20)	4:48.61 (13)	2:20.63 (19)	8:18.77 (10)
15	Jasmin Krohn	Sweden	191.819	45.08 (28)	4:50.28 (16)	2:23.66 (25)	8:24.73 (15)
16	Annette Karlsson	Sweden	195.421	43.99 (18)	4:48.70 (14)	2:20.25 (18)	9:15.65 * (16)
NC17	Natalie Grenier	Canada	137.813	43.29 (12)	4:53.10 (19)	2:17.02 (8)	–
NC18	Katie Class	United States	138.226	41.97 (3)	4:53.98 (19)	2:17.02 (21)	–
NC19	Ariane Loignon	Canada	138.726	43.56 (14)	4:55.76 (22)	2:17.62 (11)	–
NC20	Marie-France van Helden-Vives	France	140.395	44.52 (24)	4:52.89 (18)	2:21.18 (20)	–
NC21	Lyudmila Titova	Soviet Union	140.716	44.28 (23)	5:01.30 (24)	2:18.66 (13)	–
NC22	Elena Belci	Italy	141.265	44.08 (19)	4:54.15 (21)	2:24.48 (28)	–
NC23	Grietje Mulder	Netherlands	141.356	45.42 (29)	4:57.52 (23)	2:19.05 (15)	–
NC24	Edel Therese Høiseth	Norway	141.813	42.00 (4)	5:10.34 (29)	2:24.27 (27)	–
NC25	Kelly Mullen	United States	141.886	44.18 (21)	5:01.42 (26)	2:22.41 (22)	–
NC26	Svetlana Boyko	Soviet Union	142.266	44.54 (25)	5:01.36 (25)	2:22.50 (23)	–
NC27	Kim Yeong-ok	South Korea	142.616	44.20 (22)	5:02.02 (27)	2:24.24 (26)	–
NC28	Karen Gardiner	Australia	144.948	45.60 (30)	5:07.01 (28)	2:24.54 (29)	–
NC29	Stéphanie Dumont	France	145.830	43.89 (17)	5:11.34 (30)	2:30.15 (30)	–
NC30	Minna Nystedt	Norway	147.550	46.30 (31)	5:20.40 (31)	2:23.55 (24)	–
NC31	Anje Kremer	New Zealand	163.659	53.15 (32)	5:34.66 (32)	2:44.20 (31)	–
NC	Natsue Seki	Japan	92.751	44.79 (26)	4:47.77 (10)	DQ	–

* = Fall
DQ = Disqualified

== Attribution ==
In Dutch
