= Speed skating at the 1988 Winter Olympics – Women's 500 metres =

Women's 500 metres at the XV Olympic Winter Games
- Pictogram for speed skating
- Venue: Olympic Oval
- Dates: February 22, 1988
- Competitors: 30 from 15 nations
- Winning time: 39.10

Medalists
| 1st place, gold medalist(s) | | Bonnie Blair; United States |
| 2nd place, silver medalist(s) | | Christa Rothenburger; East Germany |
| 3rd place, bronze medalist(s) | | Karin Kania; East Germany |

The women's 500 metres in speed skating at the 1988 Winter Olympics took place on 22 February, at the Olympic Oval.

== Records ==
Prior to this competition, the existing world and Olympic records were as follows:

| World record | Christa Rothenburger (GDR) | 39.39 | Calgary, Canada | 6 December 1987 |
| Olympic record | Christa Rothenburger (GDR) | 41.02 | Sarajevo, Yugoslavia | 10 February 1984 |

The following new world and olympic records was set during the competition.

| Date | Pair | Athlete | Country | Time | OR | WR |
|---|---|---|---|---|---|---|
| 22 February | Pair 1 | Andrea Ehrig | East Germany | 40.71 | OR | |
| 22 February | Pair 2 | Christa Rothenburger | East Germany | 39.12 | OR | WR |
| 22 February | Pair 4 | Bonnie Blair | United States | 39.10 | OR | WR |

== Results ==
| Rank | Athlete | Country | Time | Difference | Notes |
|---|---|---|---|---|---|
| 1st place, gold medalist(s) | Bonnie Blair | United States | 39.10 | – | WR |
| 2nd place, silver medalist(s) | Christa Rothenburger | East Germany | 39.12 | +0.02 | |
| 3rd place, bronze medalist(s) | Karin Kania | East Germany | 39.24 | +0.14 | |
| 4 | Angela Stahnke | East Germany | 39.68 | +0.58 | |
| 5 | Seiko Hashimoto | Japan | 39.74 | +0.64 | |
| 6 | Shelley Rhead-Skarvan | Canada | 40.36 | +1.26 | |
| 7 | Monika Pflug | West Germany | 40.53 | +1.43 | |
| 8 | Shoko Fusano | Japan | 40.61 | +1.51 | |
| 9 | Natalya Glebova | Soviet Union | 40.66 | +1.56 | |
| 10 | Andrea Ehrig | East Germany | 40.71 | +1.61 | |
| 11 | Natalie Grenier | Canada | 40.73 | +1.63 | |
| 12 | Katie Class | United States | 40.91 | +1.81 | |
| 13 | Yoo Seon-Hee | South Korea | 40.92 | +1.82 | |
| 14 | Edel Therese Høiseth | Norway | 40.95 | +1.85 | |
| 15 | Ingrid Haringa | Netherlands | 41.12 | +2.02 | |
| 16 | Yelena Ilyina | Soviet Union | 41.15 | +2.05 | |
| 17 | Christine Aaftink | Netherlands | 41.22 | +2.12 | |
| 18 | Zofia Tokarczyk | Poland | 41.37 | +2.27 | |
| 19 | Emese Hunyady | Austria | 41.38 | +2.28 | |
| 19 | Erwina Ryś-Ferens | Poland | 41.38 | +2.28 | |
| 21 | Noriko Toda | Japan | 41.44 | +2.34 | |
| 22 | Song Hwa-son | North Korea | 41.46 | +2.36 | |
| 23 | Leslie Bader | United States | 41.57 | +2.47 | |
| 23 | Ariane Loignon | Canada | 41.57 | +2.47 | |
| 25 | Kristen Talbot | United States | 41.71 | +2.61 | |
| 26 | Han Chun-Ok | North Korea | 42.25 | +3.15 | |
| 27 | Marie-France van Helden | France | 42.49 | +3.39 | |
| 28 | Jasmin Krohn | Sweden | 42.81 | +3.71 | |
| 29 | Stéphanie Dumont | France | 43.30 | +4.20 | |
| 30 | Bibija Kerla | Yugoslavia | 44.47 | +5.37 | |
