= Speed skating at the 1988 Winter Olympics – Women's 3000 metres =

Women's 3000 metres at the XV Olympic Winter Games
- Pictogram for speed skating
- Venue: Olympic Oval
- Dates: February 23, 1988
- Competitors: 29 from 16 nations
- Winning time: 4:11.94 WR

Medalists
1st place, gold medalist(s)		Yvonne van Gennip; Netherlands
2nd place, silver medalist(s)		Andrea Ehrig; East Germany
3rd place, bronze medalist(s)		Gabi Zange; East Germany

The women's 3000 metres in speed skating at the 1988 Winter Olympics took place on 23 February, at the Olympic Oval. 25 competitors from 14 nations participated in the event.

== Records ==
Prior to this competition, the existing world and Olympic records were as follows:

World record	Gabi Zange (GDR)	4:16.76	Calgary, Canada	5 December 1987
Olympic record	Andrea Ehrig (GDR)	4:24.79	Sarajevo, Yugoslavia	15 February 1984

The following new world and olympic records was set during the competition.

Date	Pair	Athlete	Country	Time	OR	WR
23 February	Pair 1	Andrea Ehrig	East Germany	4:12.09	OR	WR
23 February	Pair 4	Yvonne van Gennip	Netherlands	4:11.94	OR	WR

== Results ==
Rank	Pair	Lane	Athlete	Country	Time	Behind	Notes
1st place, gold medalist(s)	4	I	Yvonne van Gennip	Netherlands	4:11.94	–	(WR)
(silver)	1	I	Andrea Ehrig	East Germany	4:12.09	+0.15	
(bronze)	3	O	Gabi Zange	East Germany	4:16.92	+4.98	
4	1	O	Karin Kania	East Germany	4:18.80	+6.86	
5	15	I	Erwina Ryś-Ferens	Poland	4:22.59	+10.59	
6	9	O	Svetlana Boyko	Soviet Union	4:22.90	+10.96	
7	5	O	Seiko Hashimoto	Japan	4:23.29	+11.35	
7	6	I	Yelena Lapuga	Soviet Union	4:23.29	+11.35	
9	6	O	Yelena Tumanova	Soviet Union	4:24.07	+12.13	
10	10	O	Jasmin Krohn	Sweden	4:25.06	+13.12	
11	9	I	Jane Goldman	United States	4:25.26	+13.32	
12	12	O	Anja Mischke	West Germany	4:26.30	+14.36	
13	7	I	Elena Belci	Italy	4:27.21	+15.27	
14	4	O	Emese Hunyady	Austria	4:27.56	+15.62	
15	1O	I	Ariane Loignon	Canada	4:28.55	+16.61	
16	2	O	Marieke Stam	Netherlands	4:28.92	+16.98	
17	14	O	Han Chun-ok	North Korea	4:29.16	+17.22	
18	2	I	Natsue Seki	Japan	4:29.77	+17,83	
19	3	I	Mary Docter	United States	4:29.93	+17.99	
20	12	I	Leslie Bader	United States	4:30.09	+18.15	
21	8	I	Zhang Qing	China	4:30.19	+18.25	
22	14	I	Kim Young-ok	South Korea	4:30.60	+18.66	
23	13	I	Song Hwa-Son	North Korea	4:31.05	+19.11	
24	7	O	Marie-France van Helden	France	4:32.34	+20.40	
25	13	O	Minna Nystedt	Norway	4:35.35	+23.41	
26	8	O	Chantal Côté	Canada	4:35.74	+23.80	
27	11	I	Stéphanie Dumont	France	4:38.03	+26.09	
28	15	O	Choi Hye-sook	South Korea	4:42.26	+30.32	
-	5	O	Ingrid Paul	Netherlands	DQ		
