= Speed skating at the 1988 Winter Olympics – Women's 1000 metres =

Women's 1000 metres at the XV Olympic Winter Games
- Pictogram for speed skating
- Venue: Olympic Oval
- Dates: February 26, 1988
- Competitors: 27 from 12 nations
- Winning time: 1:17.65 WR

Medalists
1st place, gold medalist(s)		Christa Rothenburger; East Germany
2nd place, silver medalist(s)		Karin Kania; East Germany
3rd place, bronze medalist(s)		Bonnie Blair; United States

The women's 1000 metres in speed skating at the 1988 Winter Olympics took place on 26 February, at the Olympic Oval.

== Records ==
Prior to this competition, the existing world and Olympic records were as follows:

World record	Karin Kania (GDR)	1:18.11	Calgary, Canada	5 December 1987
Olympic record	Karin Kania (GDR)	1:21.61	Sarajevo, Yugoslavia	13 February 1984

The following new world and olympic records was set.

Date	Pair	Athlete	Country	Time	OR	WR
26 February	Pair 3	Bonnie Blair	United States	1:18.31	OR	
26 February	Pair 4	Karin Enke	East Germany	1:17.70	OR	WR
26 February	Pair 5	Christa Rothenburger	East Germany	1:17.65	OR	WR

== Results ==
Rank	Athlete	Country	Time	Behind	Notes
1st place, gold medalist(s)	Christa Rothenburger	East Germany	1:17.65	–	(WR)
2nd place, silver medalist(s)	Karin Kania	East Germany	1:17.70	+0.05	
3rd place, bronze medalist(s)	Bonnie Blair	United States	1:18.31	+0.66	
4	Andrea Ehrig	East Germany	1:19.32	+1.67	
5	Seiko Hashimoto	Japan	1:19.75	+2.10	
6	Angela Stahnke	East Germany	1:20.05	+2.40	
7	Leslie Bader	United States	1:21.09	+3.44	
8	Katie Class	United States	1:21.10	+3.45	
9	Natalie Grenier	Canada	1:21.15	+3.50	
10	Erwina Ryś-Ferens	Poland	1:21.44	+3.79	
11	Shoko Fusano	Japan	1:21.47	+3.82	
12	Christine Aaftink	Netherlands	1:21.63	+3.92	
13	Zofia Tokarczyk	Poland	1:21.80	+4.15	
14	Shelley Rhead-Skarvan	Canada	1:21.84	+4.19	
15	Edel Therese Høiseth	Norway	1:21.90	+4.25	
16	Emese Hunyady	Austria	1:22.22	+4.57	
17	Yoo Seon-hee	South Korea	1:22.35	+4.70	
18	Yelena Ilyina	Soviet Union	1:22.40	+4.75	
19	Ariane Loignon	Canada	1:22.75	+5.10	
20	Natalya Glebova	Soviet Union	1:22.99	+5.34	
21	Ingrid Haringa	Netherlands	1:23.15	+5.50	
22	Noriko Toda	Japan	1:23.49	+5.64	
23	Han Chun-ok	North Korea	1:24.26	+6.61	
24	Nancy Swider-Peltz	United States	1:24.81	7.16	
25	Marie-Pierre Lamarche	Canada	1:25.18	+7.53	
26	Bibija Kerla	Yugoslavia	1:30.89	+13.24	
-	Song Hwa-son	North Korea	DQ		
