= East Germany at the 1988 Winter Olympics =

- IOC code: GDR
- NOC: National Olympic Committee of the German Democratic Republic

in Calgary
- Competitors: 53 (36 men, 17 women) in 8 sports
- Flag bearer: Frank-Peter Roetsch (biathlon)
- Medals Ranked 2nd: Gold 9 Silver 10 Bronze 6 Total 25

Winter Olympics appearances (overview)
- 1968; 1972; 1976; 1980; 1984; 1988

Other related appearances
- Germany (1928–1936, 1952, 1992–pres.); United Team of Germany (1956–1964)

East Germany (German Democratic Republic) competed at the Winter Olympic Games for the last time at the 1988 Winter Olympics in Calgary, Alberta, Canada. Following German reunification in 1990, a single German team would compete in the 1992 Winter Olympics.

== Medalists ==
Medal	Name	Sport	Event	Date
Gold	Uwe-Jens Mey	Speed skating	Men's 500 metres	14 February
Gold	Jens Müller	Luge	Men's singles	15 February
Gold	Steffi Walter-Martin	Luge	Women's singles	18 February
Gold	Jörg Hoffmann; Jochen Pietzsch	Luge	Doubles	19 February
Gold	Frank-Peter Roetsch	Biathlon	Individual	20 February
Gold	André Hoffmann	Speed skating	Men's 1500 metres	20 February
Gold	Frank-Peter Roetsch	Biathlon	Sprint	23 February
Gold	Christa Rothenburger	Speed skating	Women's 1000 metres	26 February
Gold	Katarina Witt	Figure skating	Women's singles	27 February
Silver	Ute Oberhoffner-Weiß	Luge	Women's singles	18 February
Silver	Uwe-Jens Mey	Speed skating	Men's 1000 metres	18 February
Silver	Stefan Krauße; Jan Behrendt	Luge	Doubles	19 February
Silver	Wolfgang Hoppe; Bogdan Musiol	Bobsleigh	Two-man	21 February
Silver	Christa Rothenburger	Speed skating	Women's 500 metres	22 February
Silver	Andrea Ehrig-Schöne-Mitscherlich	Speed skating	Women's 3000 metres	23 February
Silver	Karin Enke-Kania	Speed skating	Women's 1000 metres	26 February
Silver	Karin Enke-Kania	Speed skating	Women's 1500 metres	27 February
Silver	Wolfgang Hoppe; Dietmar Schauerhammer; Bogdan Musiol; Ingo Voge	Bobsleigh	Four-man	28 February
Silver	Andrea Ehrig-Schöne-Mitscherlich	Speed skating	Women's 5000 metres	28 February
Bronze	Cerstin Schmidt	Luge	Women's singles	18 February
Bronze	Bernhard Lehmann; Mario Hoyer	Bobsleigh	Two-man	21 February
Bronze	Karin Enke-Kania	Speed skating	Women's 500 metres	22 February
Bronze	Gabi Zange-Schönbrunn	Speed skating	Women's 3000 metres	23 February
Bronze	Andrea Ehrig-Schöne-Mitscherlich	Speed skating	Women's 1500 metres	27 February
Bronze	Gabi Zange-Schönbrunn	Speed skating	Women's 5000 metres	28 February

== Competitors ==
The following is the list of number of competitors in the Games.

Sport	Men	Women	Total
Biathlon	6	–	6
Bobsleigh	10	–	10
Cross-country skiing	2	5	7
Figure skating	2	3	5
Luge	7	3	10
Nordic combined	3	–	3
Ski jumping	2	–	2
Speed skating	4	6	10
Total	36	17	53

== Biathlon ==
Men

Event	Athlete	Misses ^{1}	Time	Rank
10 km Sprint	Frank Luck	1	25:57.6	6
10 km Sprint	André Sehmisch	2	25:52.3	5
10 km Sprint	Birk Anders	2	25:51.8	4
10 km Sprint	Frank-Peter Roetsch	1	25:08.1	1st place, gold medalist(s)

Event	Athlete	Time	Misses	Adjusted time ^{2}	Rank
20 km	Jürgen Wirth	57:25.9	3	1'00:25.9	16
20 km	Matthias Jacob	55:20.1	3	58:20.1	9
20 km	André Sehmisch	55:11.4	3	58:11.4	7
20 km	Frank-Peter Roetsch	53:33.3	3	56:33.3	1st place, gold medalist(s)

Men's 4 x 7.5 km relay

Athletes	Race		
Athletes	Misses ^{1}	Time	Rank
Jürgen Wirth; Frank-Peter Roetsch; Matthias Jacob; André Sehmisch	3	1'24:28.4	5

^{1} A penalty loop of 150 metres had to be skied per missed target.
^{2} One minute added per missed target.

== Bobsleigh ==
Sled	Athletes	Event	Run 1		Run 2		Run 3		Run 4		Total	
Sled	Athletes	Event	Time	Rank	Time	Rank	Time	Rank	Time	Rank	Time	Rank
GDR-1	Wolfgang Hoppe; Bogdan Musioł	Two-man	57.06	1	59.26	8	59.45	1	58.42	1	3:54.19	2nd place, silver medalist(s)
GDR-2	Bernhard Lehmann; Mario Hoyer	Two-man	57.65	7	58.67	2	59.59	4	58.73	3	3:54.64	3rd place, bronze medalist(s)

Sled	Athletes	Event	Run 1		Run 2		Run 3		Run 4		Total	
Sled	Athletes	Event	Time	Rank	Time	Rank	Time	Rank	Time	Rank	Time	Rank
GDR-1	Wolfgang Hoppe; Dietmar Schauerhammer; Bogdan Musioł; Ingo Voge	Four-man	56.16	1	57.31	2	56.77	13	57.34	3	3:47.58	2nd place, silver medalist(s)
GDR-2	Detlef Richter; Bodo Ferl; Ludwig Jahn; Alexander Szelig	Four-man	57.18	13	57.60	6	56.33	3	57.95	9	3:49.06	8

== Cross-country skiing ==
Men

Event	Athlete	Race	
Event	Athlete	Time	Rank
15 km C	Holger Bauroth	43:59.2	21
15 km C	Uwe Bellmann	42:17.8	5
30 km C	Holger Bauroth	1'30:03.4	22
30 km C	Uwe Bellmann	1'28:37.2	15
50 km F	Uwe Bellmann	2'08:18.6	8
50 km F	Holger Bauroth	2'07:02.4	5

C = Classical style, F = Freestyle

Women

Event	Athlete	Race	
Event	Athlete	Time	Rank
5 km C	Susann Kuhfittig	16:41.9	37
5 km C	Silke Braun	16:22.5	25
5 km C	Kerstin Moring	16:01.6	19
5 km C	Simone Opitz	15:41.1	13
10 km C	Kerstin Moring	32:12.8	25
10 km C	Susann Kuhfittig	32:01.5	23
10 km C	Simone Greiner-Petter	31:53.0	21
10 km C	Simone Opitz	31:14.3	10
20 km F	Susann Kuhfittig	1'03:05.8	38
20 km F	Simone Greiner-Petter	59:01.2	15
20 km F	Kerstin Moring	58:17.2	7
20 km F	Simone Opitz	57:54.3	5

C = Classical style, F = Freestyle

Women's 4 × 5 km relay

Athletes	Race	
Athletes	Time	Rank
Kerstin Moring; Simone Opitz; Silke Braun; Simone Greiner-Petter	1'02:19.9	5

== Figure skating ==
Men

Athlete	CF	SP	FS	TFP	Rank
Michael Huth	21	25	23	45.6	23

Women

Athlete	CF	SP	FS	TFP	Rank
Simone Koch	14	8	8	19.6	9
Katarina Witt	3	1	2	4.2	1st place, gold medalist(s)

Pairs

Athletes	SP	FS	TFP	Rank
Peggy Schwarz; Alexander König	11	6	11.5	7

== Luge ==
Men

Athlete	Run 1		Run 2		Run 3		Run 4		Total	
Athlete	Time	Rank	Time	Rank	Time	Rank	Time	Rank	Time	Rank
Michael Walter	46.578	6	46.754	6	46.838	9	46.763	3	3:06.933	5
Thomas Jacob	46.426	4	46.638	5	46.433	1	46.861	6	3:06.358	4
Jens Müller	46.301	1	46.444	1	46.436	2	46.367	1	3:05.548	1st place, gold medalist(s)

(Men's) Doubles

Athletes	Run 1		Run 2		Total	
Athletes	Time	Rank	Time	Rank	Time	Rank
Jörg Hoffmann; Jochen Pietzsch	45.786	1	46.154	2	1:31.940	1st place, gold medalist(s)
Stefan Krauße; Jan Behrendt	45.886	2	46.153	1	1:32.039	2nd place, silver medalist(s)

Women

Athlete	Run 1		Run 2		Run 3		Run 4		Total	
Athlete	Time	Rank	Time	Rank	Time	Rank	Time	Rank	Time	Rank
Cerstin Schmidt	46.078	3	46.020	1	46.059	2	46.024	3	3:04.181	3rd place, bronze medalist(s)
Ute Oberhoffner-Weiß	45.906	2	46.057	2	46.150	3	45.992	1	3:04.105	2nd place, silver medalist(s)
Steffi Walter-Martin	45.282	1	46.173	3	46.969	1	46.003	2	3:03.973	1st place, gold medalist(s)

== Nordic combined ==
Men's individual

Events:

- normal hill ski jumping (Best two out of three jumps.)
- 15 km cross-country skiing (Start delay, based on ski jumping results.)

Athlete	Event	Ski Jumping		Cross-country		Total	
Athlete	Event	Points	Rank	Start at	Time	Points	Rank
Uwe Prenzel	Individual	207.6	13	2:19.4	40:38.2	421.630	4
Marko Frank	Individual	209.4	10	2:07.4	41:15.6	416.020	8
Thomas Prenzel	Individual	215.5	5	1:26.7	41:18.1	415.640	9

Men's Team

Three participants per team.

Events:

- normal hill ski jumping (Three jumps per team member per round, best two rounds counted.)
- 10 km cross-country skiing (Start delay, based on ski jumping results.)

Athletes	Ski jumping		Cross-country		Total
Athletes	Points	Rank	Start at	Time	Rank
Thomas Prenzel; Marko Frank; Uwe Prenzel	571.6	5	4:51.0	1'23:04.5	5

== Ski jumping ==
Athlete	Event	Jump 1		Jump 2		Total	
Athlete	Event	Distance	Points	Distance	Points	Points	Rank
Remo Lederer	Normal hill	79.5	94.3	78.0	90.9	185.2	21
Jens Weißflog	Normal hill	81.5	99.5	80.0	97.1	196.6	9
Jens Weißflog	Large hill	104.5	95.7	93.5	76.3	172.0	31
Remo Lederer	Large hill	105.5	98.1	97.0	83.7	181.8	22

== Speed skating ==
Men

Event	Athlete	Race	
Event	Athlete	Time	Rank
500 m	Peter Adeberg	38.11	28
500 m	André Hoffmann	37.75	21
500 m	Uwe-Jens Mey	36.45 WR	1st place, gold medalist(s)
1000 m	André Hoffmann	1:14.62	15
1000 m	Peter Adeberg	1:14.19	8
1000 m	Uwe-Jens Mey	1:13.11	2nd place, silver medalist(s)
1500 m	Peter Adeberg	1:53.57	8
1500 m	André Hoffmann	1:52.06 WR	1st place, gold medalist(s)
5000 m	Roland Freier	6:51.42	8
10,000 m	Roland Freier	14:19.16	8

Women

Event	Athlete	Race	
Event	Athlete	Time	Rank
500 m	Andrea Ehrig-Schöne-Mitscherlich	40.71	10
500 m	Angela Stahnke-Hauck	39.68	4
500 m	Karin Enke-Kania	39.24	3rd place, bronze medalist(s)
500 m	Christa Rothenburger	39.12	2nd place, silver medalist(s)
1000 m	Angela Stahnke-Hauck	1:20.05	6
1000 m	Andrea Ehrig-Schöne-Mitscherlich	1:19.32	4
1000 m	Karin Enke-Kania	1:17.70	2nd place, silver medalist(s)
1000 m	Christa Rothenburger	1:17.65 WR	1st place, gold medalist(s)
1500 m	Gunda Niemann-Stirnemann-Kleemann	2:04.68	7
1500 m	Andrea Ehrig-Schöne-Mitscherlich	2:01.49	3rd place, bronze medalist(s)
1500 m	Karin Enke-Kania	2:00.82	2nd place, silver medalist(s)
3000 m	Karin Enke-Kania	4:18.80	4
3000 m	Gabi Zange-Schönbrunn	4:16.92	3rd place, bronze medalist(s)
3000 m	Andrea Ehrig-Schöne-Mitscherlich	4:12.09	2nd place, silver medalist(s)
5000 m	Gunda Niemann-Stirnemann-Kleemann	7:34.59	7
5000 m	Gabi Zange-Schönbrunn	7:21.61	3rd place, bronze medalist(s)
5000 m	Andrea Ehrig-Schöne-Mitscherlich	7:17.12	2nd place, silver medalist(s)
