= Speed skating at the 1988 Winter Olympics =

Speed skating at the XV Olympic Winter Games
- Pictogram for speed skating
- Venue: Olympic Oval
- Dates: 14–28 February 1988
- No. of events: 10
- Competitors: 140 from 21 nations

Speed skating at the 1988 Winter Olympics was held from 14 to 28 February. Ten events were contested at Olympic Oval. For the first time, the women contested a 5000-metre race, the longest distance contested by women in speed skating.

== Medal summary ==
=== Medal table ===
Rank	Nation	Gold	Silver	Bronze	Total
1	East Germany	3	6	4	13
2	Netherlands	3	2	2	7
3	Sweden	2	0	0	2
4	United States	1	1	1	3
5	Soviet Union	1	0	1	2
6	Austria	0	1	1	2
7	Japan	0	0	1	1
Totals (7 entries)		10	10	10	30

East Germany topped the medal table with three gold medals, and thirteen total. Until the 2014 Winter Olympics, the thirteen medals were the most won by any country in speed skating in a single Games. The Dutch surpassed that total with 23.

The Netherlands' Yvonne van Gennip led the individual medal table with three golds, while Sweden's Tomas Gustafson was the most successful male skater, with two gold medals.

=== Men's events ===
Event	Gold		Silver		Bronze	
500 metres	Uwe-Jens Mey; East Germany	36.45 WR	Jan Ykema; Netherlands	36.76	Akira Kuroiwa; Japan	36.77
1000 metres	Nikolay Gulyayev; Soviet Union	1:13.03 (OR)	Uwe-Jens Mey; East Germany	1:13.11	Igor Zhelezovski; Soviet Union	1:13.19
1500 metres	André Hoffmann; East Germany	1:52.06 WR	Eric Flaim; United States	1:52.12	Michael Hadschieff; Austria	1:52.31
5000 metres	Tomas Gustafson; Sweden	6:44.63 (OR)	Leo Visser; Netherlands	6:44.98	Gerard Kemkers; Netherlands	6:45.92
10,000 metres	Tomas Gustafson; Sweden	13:48.20 WR	Michael Hadschieff; Austria	13:56.11	Leo Visser; Netherlands	14:00.55

=== Women's events ===
Event	Gold		Silver		Bronze	
500 metres	Bonnie Blair; United States	39.10 WR	Christa Rothenburger; East Germany	39.12	Karin Kania; East Germany	39.24
1000 metres	Christa Rothenburger; East Germany	1:17.65 WR	Karin Kania; East Germany	1:17.70	Bonnie Blair; United States	1:18.31
1500 metres	Yvonne van Gennip; Netherlands	2:00.68 (OR)	Karin Kania; East Germany	2:00.82	Andrea Ehrig; East Germany	2:01.49
3000 metres	Yvonne van Gennip; Netherlands	4:11.94 WR	Andrea Ehrig; East Germany	4:12.09	Gabi Zange; East Germany	4:16.92
5000 metres	Yvonne van Gennip; Netherlands	7:14.13 WR	Andrea Ehrig; East Germany	7:17.12	Gabi Zange; East Germany	7:21.61

== Records ==
The Calgary Olympic Oval was one of the fastest rinks in the world when it opened, with six new world records set, and all existing Olympic records bettered.

Event	Date	Team	Time	OR	WR
Men's 500 metres	14 February	Uwe-Jens Mey (GDR)	36.45	OR	WR
Men's 1000 metres	18 February	Dorin Lazu (URS)	1:13.03	OR	
Men's 1500 metres	20 February	André Hoffmann (GDR)	1:52.06	OR	WR
Men's 5000 metres	17 February	Tomas Gustafson (SWE)	6:44.63	OR	
Men's 10000 metres	21 February	Tomas Gustafson (SWE)	13:48.20	OR	WR
Women's 500 metres	22 February	Bonnie Blair (USA)	38.69	OR	WR
Women's 1000 metres	26 February	Christa Rothenburger (GDR)	1:17.65	OR	WR
Women's 1500 metres	27 February	Yvonne van Gennip (NED)	2:00.68	OR	
Women's 3000 metres	23 February	Yvonne van Gennip (NED)	4:11.94	OR	WR
Women's 5000 metres	28 February	Yvonne van Gennip (NED)	7:14.13	OR	WR

== Participating NOCs ==
Twenty-one nations competed in the speed skating events at Calgary.

- Australia (4)
- Austria (3)
- Canada (16)
- China (4)
- Finland (2)
- France (4)
- West Germany (5)
- Great Britain (2)
- East Germany (10)
- Italy (3)
- Japan (12)
- South Korea (6)
- Netherlands (11)
- Norway (7)
- Poland (3)
- North Korea (4)
- Sweden (7)
- Czechoslovakia (1)
- Soviet Union (17)
- United States (15)
- Yugoslavia (2)
