= Netherlands at the 1988 Winter Olympics =

- Flag of the Netherlands
- IOC code: NED (HOL used at these Games)
- NOC: Dutch Olympic Committee

in Calgary
- Competitors: 11 (6 men, 5 women) in 1 sport
- Flag bearer: Jan Ykema (speedskating)
- Medals Ranked 7th: Gold 3 Silver 2 Bronze 2 Total 7

Winter Olympics appearances (overview)
- 1928; 1932; 1936; 1948; 1952; 1956; 1960; 1964; 1968; 1972; 1976; 1980; 1984; 1988; 1992; 1994; 1998; 2002; 2006; 2010; 2014; 2018; 2022; 2026

Athletes from the Netherlands competed at the 1988 Winter Olympics in Calgary, Alberta, Canada.

== Medalists ==
Medal	Name	Sport	Event	Date
Gold	Yvonne van Gennip	Speed skating	Women's 3000 metres	23 February
Gold	Yvonne van Gennip	Speed skating	Women's 1500 metres	27 February
Gold	Yvonne van Gennip	Speed skating	Women's 5000 metres	28 February
Silver	Jan Ykema	Speed skating	Men's 500 metres	14 February
Silver	Leo Visser	Speed skating	Men's 5000 metres	17 February
Bronze	Gerard Kemkers	Speed skating	Men's 5000 metres	17 February
Bronze	Leo Visser	Speed skating	Men's 10000 metres	21 February

== Competitors ==
The following is the list of number of competitors in the Games.

Sport	Men	Women	Total
Speed skating	6	5	11
Total	6	5	11

== Speed skating ==
Men

Event	Athlete	Race	
Event	Athlete	Time	Rank
500 m	Menno Boelsma	37.52	16
500 m	Hein Vergeer	37.80	24
500 m	Jan Ykema	36.76	2nd place, silver medalist(s)
1000 m	Menno Boelsma	1:15.34	24
1000 m	Hein Vergeer	1:14.62	15
1000 m	Jan Ykema	DNF	–
1500 m	Hein Vergeer	1:56.63	27
5000 m	Herbert Dijkstra	6:54.63	13
5000 m	Gerard Kemkers	6:45.92	3rd place, bronze medalist(s)
5000 m	Leo Visser	6:44.98	2nd place, silver medalist(s)
10,000 m	Herbert Dijkstra	14:22.53	11
10,000 m	Gerard Kemkers	14:08.34	5
10,000 m	Leo Visser	14:00.55	3rd place, bronze medalist(s)

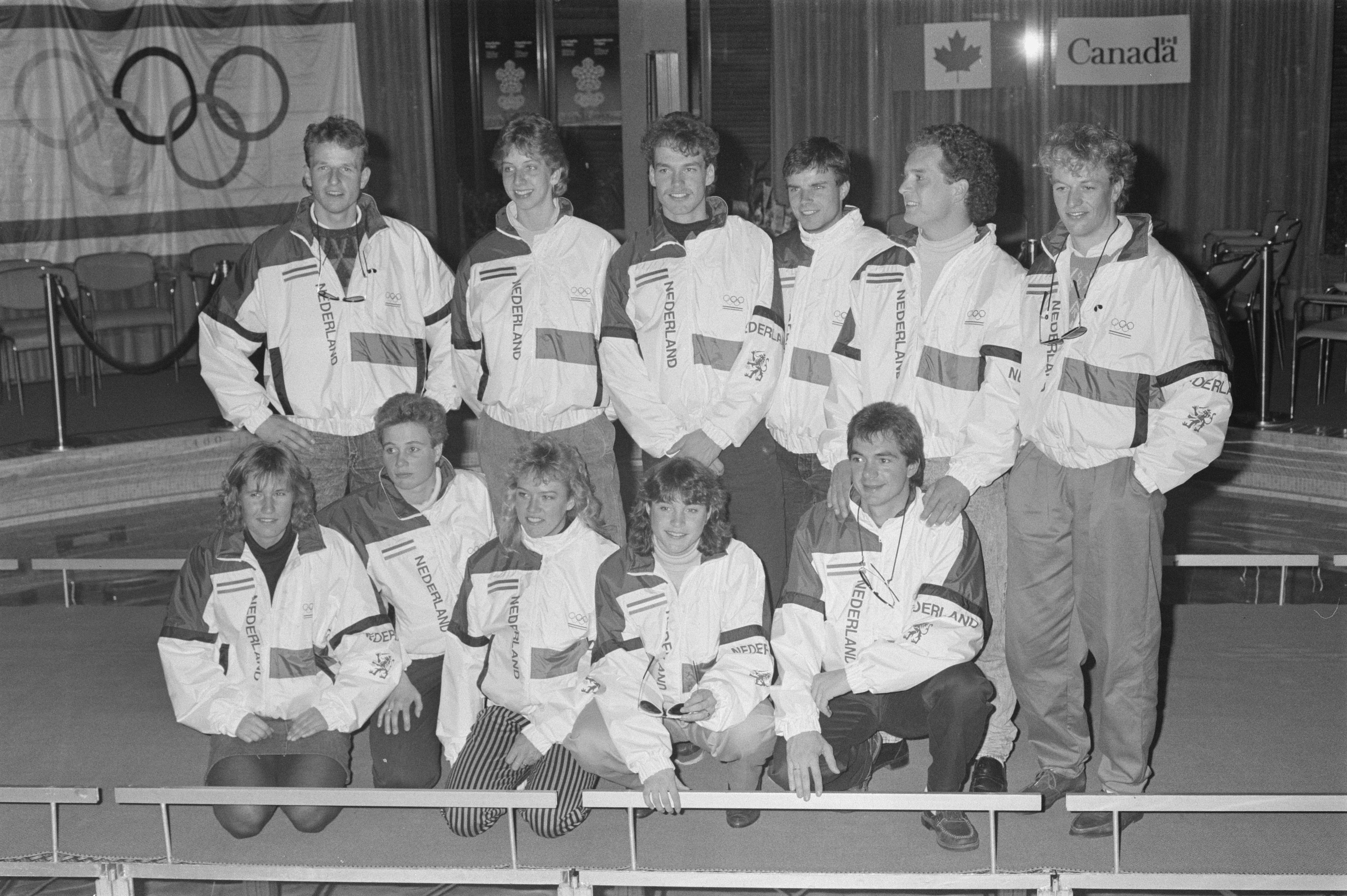
The Dutch speedskating Olympic team

Women

Event	Athlete	Race	
Event	Athlete	Time	Rank
500 m	Christine Aaftink	41.22	17
500 m	Ingrid Haringa	41.12	15
1000 m	Christine Aaftink	1:21.63	12
1000 m	Ingrid Haringa	1:23.15	21
1500 m	Yvonne van Gennip	2:00.68 OR	1st place, gold medalist(s)
1500 m	Marieke Stam	2:07.00	12
3000 m	Yvonne van Gennip	4:11.94 WR	1st place, gold medalist(s)
3000 m	Ingrid Paul	DSQ	–
3000 m	Marieke Stam	4:28.92	16
5000 m	Yvonne van Gennip	7:14.13 WR	1st place, gold medalist(s)
5000 m	Ingrid Paul	7:40.67	14
5000 m	Marieke Stam	7:38.02	13
