= 1988 Winter Olympics national flag bearers =

During the Parade of Nations section of the 1988 Winter Olympics opening ceremony, athletes from the participating countries marched into the arena. Each delegation was led by a flag bearer and a sign with the name of the country on it. The Parade of Nations was organized in English, one of the official languages in Canada. As tradition dictates, Greece led the parade and Canada was the last to march to the stadium as the host nation. Organizers played Happy Birthday to You during Australia's team march as a homage to Australia which was celebrating Bicentenary event at that time.

== List ==
Order	Nation	Flag bearer	Sport
1	Greece	Thomai Lefousi	Alpine skiing
2	Andorra	Claudina Rossell	Alpine skiing
3	Argentina	Julio Moreschi	Cross-country skiing
4	Australia	Michael Richmond	Speed skating
5	Austria	Leonhard Stock	Alpine skiing
6	Belgium	Katrien Pauwels	Figure skating
7	Bolivia	Guillermo Avilapaz	Alpine skiing
8	Bulgaria	Vladimir Velitchkov	Biathlon
9	Chile	Nils Linneberg	Alpine skiing
10	China	Zhang Zhubin	Figure skating
11	Costa Rica	Arturo Kinch	Alpine skiing
12	Cyprus	Karolina Fotiadou	Alpine skiing
13	Czechoslovakia	Jiří Parma	Ski jumping
14	North Korea	Ri Im-bin	Speed skating
15	Denmark	Lars Dresler	Figure skating
16	West Germany	Peter Angerer	Biathlon
17	Fiji	Rusiate Rogoyawa	Cross-country skiing
18	Finland	Pertti Niittylä	Speed skating
19	France	Catherine Quittet	Alpine skiing
20	East Germany	Frank-Peter Roetsch	Biathlon
21	Great Britain	Nick Phipps	Bobsleigh
22	Guam	Judd Bankert	Biathlon
23	Guatemala	Alfredo Rego	Alpine skiing
24	Hungary	Attila Tóth	Figure skating
25	Iceland	Einar Ólafsson	Cross-country skiing
26	India	Kishor Rahtna Rai	Alpine skiing
27	Italy	Paul Hildgartner	Luge
28	Jamaica	Dudley Stokes	Bobsleigh
29	Japan	Seiko Hashimoto	Speed skating
30	South Korea	Hong Kun-pyo	Cross-country skiing
31	Lebanon	Michel Samen	
32	Liechtenstein	Andreas Wenzel	Alpine skiing
33	Luxembourg	Armand Wagener	
34	Mexico	Ricardo Olavarrieta	Figure skating
35	Monaco	Albert II, Prince of Monaco	Bobsleigh
36	Mongolia	Enkhee Davaagiin	Cross-country skiing
37	Morocco	Mustapha Naitlhou	Non-competitor
38	Netherlands	Jan Ykema	Speed skating
39	Netherlands Antilles	Bart Carpentier Alting	Luge
40	New Zealand	Simon Wi Rutene	Alpine skiing
41	Norway	Oddvar Brå	Cross-country skiing
42	Philippines	Raymund Ocampo	Luge
43	Poland	Henryk Gruth	Ice hockey
44	Portugal	Antonio Reis	Bobsleigh
45	Puerto Rico	Mary Pat Wilson	Alpine skiing
46	Romania	Dorin Degan	Bobsleigh
47	San Marino	Nicola Ercolani	Alpine skiing
48	Spain	Ainhoa Ibarra	Alpine skiing
49	Sweden	Thomas Wassberg	Cross-country skiing
50	Switzerland	Michela Figini	Alpine skiing
51	Chinese Taipei	Chen Chin-san	Bobsleigh
52	Turkey	Abdullah Yılmaz	Cross-country skiing
53	Soviet Union	Andrey Bukin	Figure Skating
54	United States	Lyle Nelson	Biathlon
55	Virgin Islands	Seba Johnson	Alpine skiing
56	Yugoslavia	Bojan Krizaj	Alpine skiing
57	Canada	Brian Orser	Figure Skating
