= Lyle Nelson =

American biathlete

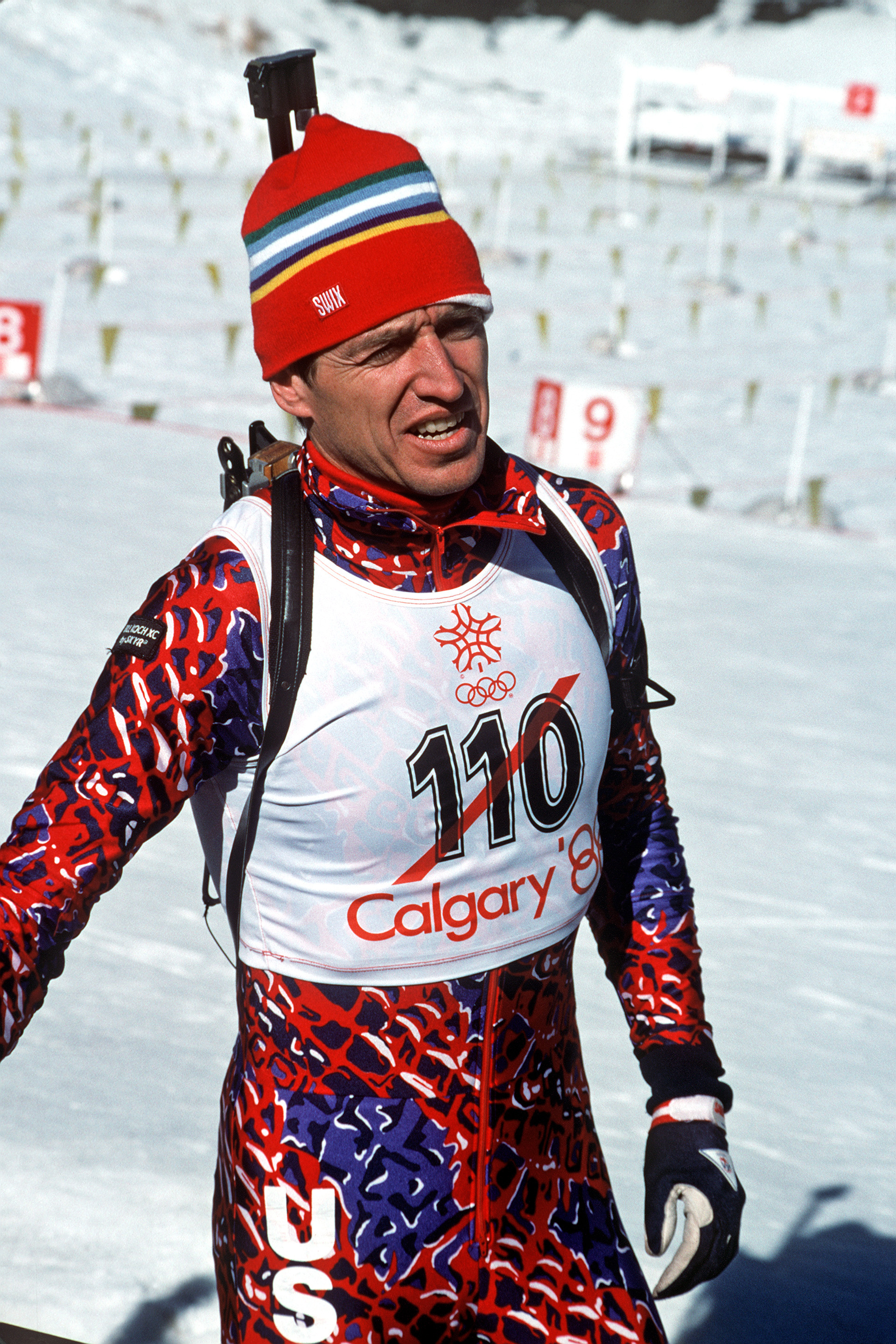
Nelson in 1988

Lyle Barber Nelson (born February 9, 1949, in McCall, Idaho) is a retired American biathlete. He represented USA at four Olympics. At his last Olympics in 1988, he was the flag bearer.

In 1976 he finished 35th in the Individual 20K biathlon. He led off the American team with Dennis Donahue, John Morton and Peter Dascoulias as they finished 11th place in the 30K relay.

In 1980, when USA hosted at Lake Placid, he finished 19th in the new 10K sprint biathlon and joined Martin Hagen, Donald Nielsen Jr. and Peter Hoag Jr. in finishing 8th in the 30K relay.

In 1984, he returned to the Individual 20K biathlon, finishing 26th. He joined Nielsen again along with Bill Carow and Josh Thompson in finishing 11th in the 30K relay.

In 1988, as the 39 year old veteran, he was selected to carry the flag at the 1988 Opening Ceremonies held just north of his home in Calgary. In the 10K sprint, he finished tied with Sverre Istad for 30th place and joined Thompson, Curt Schreiner and Darin Binning in finishing 9th in the relay.

== Personal life ==
Prior to the Olympics, he attended the United States Military Academy, graduating in 1971 and joining the Army, rising to the rank of Captain. He later attended the University of Southern California, earning his master's degree.

As an administrator, he was the president of the United States Biathlon Association. He worked on trying to expand the sport into a summer biathlon program to attract some of the 16 million runners into biathlon.

He served as a commentator at the 1994 and 1998 Olympics. When the Olympics returned to the US at Salt Lake City in 2002, he served as the venue director for the biathlon.

He is currently Director of Community Relations and Health Promotion at St. Luke's McCall Hospital in his home town.
