= Anja Mischke =

German speed skater (born 1967)

Personal information
- Born: April 29, 1967 (age 58); Berlin, West Germany

Sport
- Country: West Germany
- Sport: speed skating

Anja Mischke (born 29 April 1967) is a former West German female speed skater. She represented West Germany at the 1988 Winter Olympics and competed in the women's 1500m and in the women's 3000m speed skating events.
