= Joseph Galanes =

American cross-country skier (born 1965)

Personal information
- Born: June 3, 1965 (age 61) Brattleboro, Vermont, United States

Sport
- Sport: Cross-country skiing

Joseph Galanes (born June 3, 1965) is an American cross-country skier. He competed in the men's 15 kilometre classical event at the 1988 Winter Olympics.
