= Kristin Krone =

American alpine skier (born 1968)

Kristin Krone (born June 17, 1968) is an American former alpine skier who competed in the 1988 Winter Olympics and 1992 Winter Olympics.
