= Ingrid Haringa =

Dutch speed skater and racing cyclist

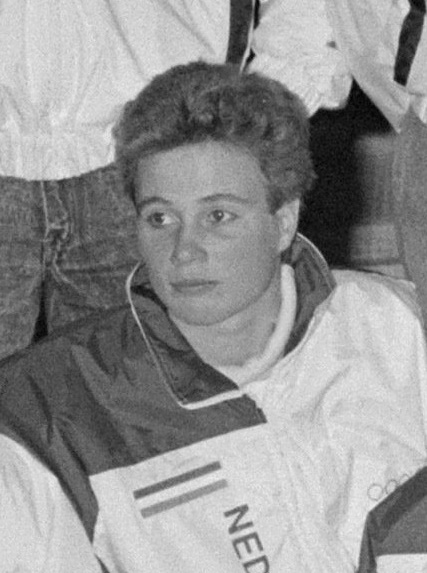
- Ingrid Haringa in 1988

Personal information
- Born: 11 July 1964 (age 61) Velsen, the Netherlands
- Height: 1.75 m (5 ft 9 in)
- Weight: 70 kg (154 lb)

Sport
- Sport: Cycling
Medal record
Olympic Games
Bronze medal – third place	1992 Barcelona	Sprint
Bronze medal – third place	1996 Atlanta	Sprint
Silver medal – second place	1996 Atlanta	Points race

Ingrid Roelinda Haringa (born 11 July 1964) is a police officer and a former Dutch speed skater and track cyclist.

== Biography ==
=== Skating ===
Ingrid Haringa began her career as a speed skater. During the late eighties she was considered one of the best sprinters in the Netherlands. At the Dutch Championships, she won four gold medals: in the 500 meters in 1987 and 1988 and in the 1000 meters in 1988 and 1989. She participated as part of the Dutch team at the 1988 Olympic Winter Games in Calgary. She finished 15th in the 500 meters and 21st in the 1000 meters. At the World Sprint Championships in 1989 she finished fourth. She subsequently shifted her focus to cycling.

==== Personal bests ====
Haringa's personal bests are:

- 500 m – 40.61 (1988)
- 1000 m – 1:21.41 (1989)
- 1500 m – 2:10.56 (1987)
- 3000 m – 4:43.62 (1990)
- 5000 m – 8:21.8 (1983)

=== Cycling ===
In 1991 she made her debut at the UCI Track Cycling World Championships in Stuttgart. There, she started in the team pursuit, sprint and the points race. She became world champion in the latter two disciplines at her first attempt. She subsequently defended her world title in the points race for three years in a row. At the 1992 Summer Olympics in Barcelona, she won a bronze medal in the sprint. Her performance at the 1996 Summer Olympics in Atlanta was even better, as she won silver in the points race, as well as another bronze in the sprint. In 1996, she also competed in the road race, despite being a track sprinter; however, she did not finish the race.

Because of her performances on the velodrome, she was named Dutch Sportswoman of the Year in 1991 and in 1996.

=== Post-active career ===
In 1998 she went back to the skating rink, but now as coach of Gianni Romme and Bob de Jong. After one season Haringa was succeeded by the American Peter Mueller.

== See also ==
- List of Dutch Olympic cyclists

Awards
Preceded by Leontien van Moorsel	Dutch Sportswoman of the Year; 1991	Succeeded by Ellen van Langen
Preceded by Angelique Seriese	Dutch Sportswoman of the Year; 1996	Succeeded by Tonny de Jong
