= Bill Spencer (cross-country skier) =

American cross-country skier (born 1956)

Personal information
- Born: March 23, 1956 (age 70) Anchorage, Alaska, United States

Sport
- Sport: Cross-country skiing

David William "Bill" Spencer (born March 23, 1956) is an American cross-country skier. He competed in the men's 15 kilometre classical event, the men's 50 kilometre freestyle, and the men's 4 x 10 kilometre relay at the 1988 Winter Olympics finishing 40th, 56th, and 13th respectively.
