= Choi Hye-sook =

South Korean speed skater

Personal information
- Nationality: South Korean
- Born: 21 January 1971 (age 54)

Sport
- Sport: Speed skating

Choi Hye-sook (born 21 January 1971) is a South Korean speed skater. She competed in two events at the 1988 Winter Olympics.
