= Kevin Brochman =

American cross-country skier (born 1959)

Personal information
- Born: July 6, 1959 (age 67) Stillwater, Minnesota, United States

Sport
- Sport: Cross-country skiing

Kevin Brochman (born July 6, 1959) is an American cross-country skier. He competed at the 1984 Winter Olympics and the 1988 Winter Olympics.
