= Jim Herberich =

American bobsledder

Personal information
- Born: March 8, 1963 (age 63) Winchester, Massachusetts, United States

Sport
- Sport: Bobsleigh

Jim Herberich (born March 8, 1963) is an American bobsledder. He competed at the 1988, 1994 and the 1998 Winter Olympics. He graduated from Harvard University.
