= Thomas Prenzel =

East German Nordic combined skier

Thomas Prenzel (born August 7, 1968) was an East German Nordic combined skier who competed in the late 1980s. At the 1988 Winter Olympics in Calgary, he finished fifth in the 3 x 10 km team and ninth in the 15 km individual events.

Prenzel's only victory was in a 15 km individual event in Italy in 1987. His best World Cup finish was sixth twice in 15 km individual events in 1988.
