= Yelena Ilyina =

Soviet speed skater

Personal information
- Nationality: Soviet
- Born: 5 May 1967 (age 57)

Sport
- Sport: Speed skating

Yelena Ilyina (born 5 May 1967) is a Soviet speed skater. She competed in two events at the 1988 Winter Olympics.
