= Jon Engen =

American skier (1957–2018)

Personal information
- Nationality: American
- Born: March 9, 1957; Oslo, Norway
- Died: April 26, 2018 (aged 61)

Sport
- Sport: Biathlon, cross-country skiing

Jon Engen (March 9, 1957 – April 26, 2018) was an American skier. He competed at the 1988 Winter Olympics, the 1992 Winter Olympics, and the 1994 Winter Olympics, taking part in both biathlon, and cross-country skiing.

== Biography ==
Engen was born in Oslo, Norway in 1957, and learned to ski from the age of four. While in Norway, he won junior competition titles and achieved success at a national level. After attending the University of Oslo and serving in the Norwegian Army, he moved to America in 1980. Three years later, he graduated from the Montana State University, where he had to study English as a foreign language.

In the mid 1980s, Engen began training in an attempt to be selected for the American Olympic team for cross-country skiing, including roller skiing at night. Engen eventually qualified for the 1988 Winter Olympics in Calgary, Canada. He then competed at the 1992 Winter Olympics in Albertville, France, before returning to the country of his birth for the 1994 Winter Olympics in Lillehammer. At the masters level, Engen won more than twenty World Cup medals, including twelve golds.

After competing at three Winter Olympics, Engen coached cross-country skiing in Sun Valley, where he started a Nordic skiing programme. Engen was also on the board of the US Ski & Snowboard Association, working for the association for a decade. He was inducted into the Sun Valley Ski Hall of Fame, and just prior to his death, he was awarded with the Al Merrill Nordic Award for services to Nordic skiing.

Engen died in April 2018 from pancreatic cancer, after being diagnosed with the illness in August 2017. In 2019, the Boulder Mountain Tour was held in his memory.
