= Jack Miller (alpine skier) =

American alpine skier (born 1965)

John 'Jack' Miller (born March 20, 1965) is an American former alpine skier who competed in the 1988 Winter Olympics. He was born in Boulder, Colorado and in no relation to the more famous alpine skier and former FIS World Cup champion Bode Miller.

After the 1988 Winter Olympics, Jack Miller skied professionally until 1994. After his ski career ended, Miller attended Regis University, graduating in 1998 with a degree in marketing. In 1999 Miller moved from Steamboat Springs, Colorado and settled in the mountains above Boulder, Colorado where he became the owner of Action Getaway, which helps people plan and develop worldwide ski package adventures. Miller was also the national pacesetter for NASTAR racing in the United States and Canada. Miller and his wife Athan later owned and operated Steamers Coffeehouse, Jack's Bar and Grill and became owner-managers of Village Square at the Village of Five Parks in Arvada, Colorado.
