= Katie Class =

American speed skater (born 1963)

Personal information
- Born: March 24, 1963 (age 63) Saint Paul, Minnesota, United States

Sport
- Sport: Speed skating

Katie Class (born March 24, 1963) is an American speed skater. She competed in two events at the 1984 Winter Olympics and three events at the 1988 Winter Olympics. She later became a director for USA Speedskating.

== Biography ==
Class was born in Saint Paul, Minnesota in 1963, and was the youngest of seven. She began skating when she was five years old. Class went to Morehead State University. She skated on the US national team for most of the 1980s, winning five medals at the World Cup and a bronze at the 1987 World Championships.

Class took part at two editions of the Winter Olympics. At the 1984 Winter Olympics in Sarajevo, Class took part in the women's 500 metres and women's 1,000 metres events, with her best result of tenth place in the 500 metres. Four years later, at the 1988 Winter Olympics in Calgary, she took part in the 500 metres, 1,000 metres and the 1,500 metres. Her best finish was eighth in 1,000 metres.

Class retired from competitions in 1988, and also graduated from the University of Minnesota. Following her career as a speedskater, Class became the executive director of USA Speedskating, spending 16 years in the role. She was inducted into the US Speedskating Hall of Fame in April 2009. The following year, she was also inducted into the Greater Cleveland Sports Hall of Fame.
