= Mark Greenwald =

American speed skater

Personal information
- Nationality: American
- Born: December 1, 1968 (age 57) Chicago, Illinois, United States

Sport
- Sport: Speed skating

Mark Greenwald (born December 1, 1968) is an American speed skater. He competed at the 1988 Winter Olympics and the 1992 Winter Olympics. In 2010, he became the Executive Director of US Speedskating.
