= Marko Frank =

East German Nordic combined skier

Marko Frank (born 25 December 1968) was an East German Nordic combined skier who competed in the late 1980s. At the 1988 Winter Olympics in Calgary, he finished fifth in the 3 x 10 km team and eighth in the 15 km individual events.

Frank's best individual career was third in a 15 km individual event in Italy in 1987. His best World Cup finish was seventh in a 15 km individual event in Switzerland in 1988.
