= Bill Hudson (alpine skier) =

American alpine skier (born 1966)

Bill Hudson (born June 27, 1966, in Los Angeles) is an American former alpine skier who competed in the 1988 Winter Olympics.
