= Kim Young-ok (speed skater) =

South Korean speed skater

Personal information
- Nationality: South Korean
- Born: 13 September 1966 (age 58)

Sport
- Sport: Speed skating

Kim Young-ok (born 13 September 1966) is a South Korean speed skater. She competed in three events at the 1988 Winter Olympics.
