= Bonnie Blair =

American speed skater (born 1964)

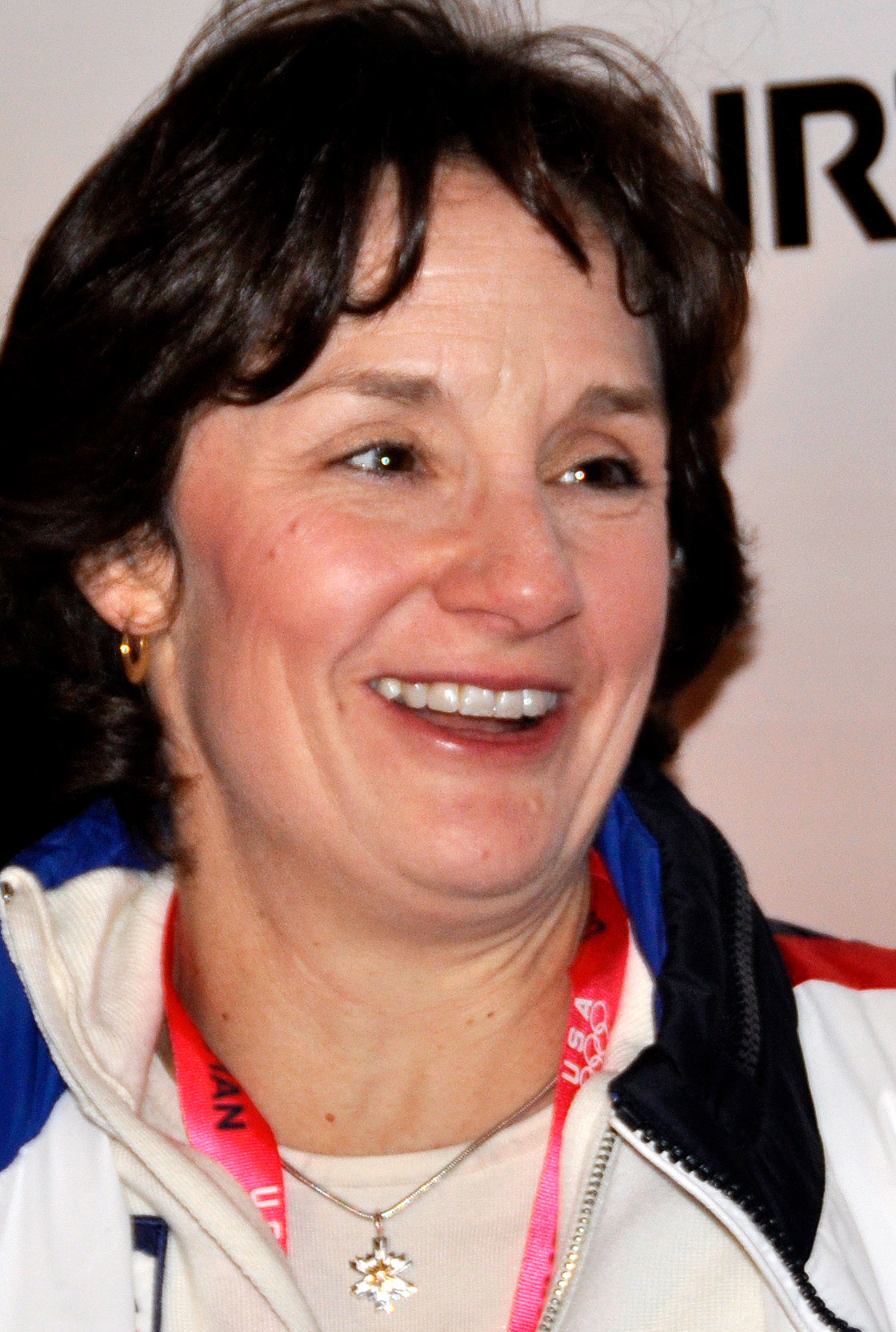
- Blair in 2010

Personal information
- Born: March 18, 1964 (age 62) Cornwall, New York, U.S.
- Height: 5 ft 5 in (165 cm)
- Weight: 130 lb (59 kg)
- Spouse: Dave Cruikshank (m. 1996)

Sport
- Country: United States
- Sport: Speed skating
- Turned pro: 1984
- Retired: 1995

Achievements and titles
- Olympic finals: 1984, 1988, 1992, 1994
Medal record
Women's speed skating
Representing the United States
Olympic Games
Gold medal – first place	1988 Calgary	500 m
Gold medal – first place	1992 Albertville	500 m
Gold medal – first place	1992 Albertville	1,000 m
Gold medal – first place	1994 Lillehammer	500 m
Gold medal – first place	1994 Lillehammer	1,000 m
Bronze medal – third place	1988 Calgary	1,000 m
World Championships
Gold medal – first place	1989 Heerenveen	Sprint
Gold medal – first place	1994 Calgary	Sprint
Gold medal – first place	1995 Milwaukee	Sprint
Silver medal – second place	1987 Sainte Foy	Sprint
Silver medal – second place	1990 Tromsø	Sprint
Silver medal – second place	1992 Oslo	Sprint
Silver medal – second place	1993 Ikaho	Sprint
Bronze medal – third place	1986 Karuizawa	Sprint
Bronze medal – third place	1988 West Allis	Sprint

Bonnie Kathleen Blair (born March 18, 1964) is a retired American speed skater. She is one of the top skaters of her era, and one of the most decorated athletes in Olympic history. Blair competed for the United States in four Olympics, winning five gold medals and one bronze medal.

Blair made her Olympic debut in Sarajevo in 1984 where she finished eighth in the 500 meters. At the time, Blair trained in both short-track and long-track speed skating. She won the 1986 short-track world championship. Blair returned to the Olympics in 1988 competing in long-track at the 1988 Winter Olympics in Calgary. There she won her first Olympic gold medal in the 500 meters and a bronze medal in the 1,000 meter. Blair won two gold medals in the 1992 Winter Olympics in Albertville and her final two Olympic gold medals at the 1994 Lillehammer games. Blair continued competing through 1995 when the World Championships were held in Milwaukee, finally retiring in March 1995.

After retiring from speed skating, Blair became a motivational speaker. She has been inducted into the Chicagoland Sports Hall of Fame, the Wisconsin Athletic Hall of Fame, and the United States Olympic Hall of Fame.

== Early life and education ==
Blair was born in Cornwall, New York to Charlie and Eleanor Blair. She was the youngest of six children. Her godmother is Canadian speed skater Cathy Priestner. The family moved to Champaign, Illinois when Bonnie was a toddler. Bonnie first tried skating, already a hobby for her siblings, at age two. She participated in her first skating meet at age 4. Early on, Blair competed in "pack style," or short track speed skating, where several skaters race on the ice at once. At age 7, Blair won her age group at the Illinois Speed Skating Championship. She attended Jefferson Middle School and later Champaign Centennial High School In addition to skating, Blair was also a cheer leader and a member of the student council.

It wasn't until 1979 when Olympic medalist Cathy Priestner Faminow became Blair's coach that Blair switched from pack style to long track speed skating in which skaters compete for the fastest time. At age 15, Blair tried out for the national team, earning a spot on her first attempt. With her increased focus on the 1984 Olympics, Blair went to train in Europe. To finance the expense of training in Europe, the Champaign Policemen's Benevolent Association began helping to sponsor Blair. She completed her high school diploma through the mail in 1982. She moved to the Milwaukee area to train with the United States national speed skating team, living with a family friend while she trained. Blair took classes at Parkland College, although college classes were less of a priority than training and she did not receive a degree.

== Career ==
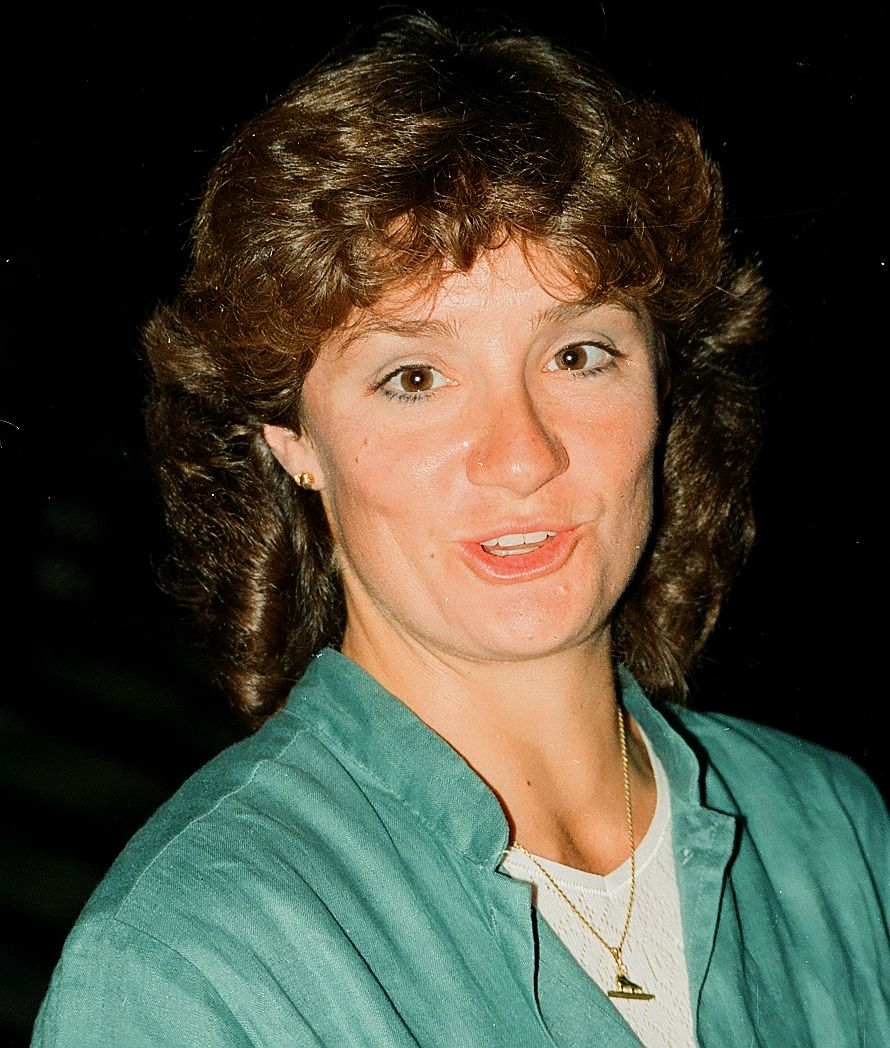

=== Early career and first Olympics (1984–1986) ===
Blair made her international competitive debut at the 1984 World Sprinting Championships where she placed tenth. Later that year, Blair appeared at her first Olympic games at age 19 in Sarajevo. Blair had not been not considered a front-runner and later recalled she was happy just to be at the games and see her family in the stands. She failed to medal and finished eighth in the 500 meters. The U.S. failed to win any speed skating medals at the 1984 Olympics. After the 1984 Olympics, Blair worked closely with coach Mike Crowe to improve her skating skills to compete with the powerful East German skaters.

A strong performance at the United States International Skating Association Metric All-Around Championships, held in West Allis, Wisconsin, earned Blair a spot on the U.S. long track women's sprint team for the 1985 World Championships. Blair won both the 500 meter and 1500 meter at the West Allis event, and was considered one of the U.S. team's strongest medal contenders. On the 1985-1986 World Cup Circuit, Blair finished fourth in four distances: the 500 meter, 1,000 meter, and 1,500 meter. In May 1985, at a time when U.S. speed skating lacked unity, U.S. International Speedskating Association replaced national team coach Dianne Holum with Mike Crowe.

During this time, Blair trained in both short-track and long-track. Blair won events at 1984, 1985 and 1986 short-track world championships and was the 1986 overall short-track world champion.

=== Rise and becoming an Olympic medalist (1987–1989) ===
Early in 1987, Blair won World Cup titles in the 500 and 1,000 meters. She followed up her World Cup titles in by setting her first world record in the 500 meters with a time 39.43 seconds. Blair also proved she could beat East-German world champion Karin Enke-Kania in head-to-head match-ups. Although Blair was four inches shorter than Enke-Kania, Blair's technique and fast start time made her a formidable competitor. Blair held a world record at 500 meters until December 1987 when Christa Rothenburger beat her time at the World Cup. Blair, under the weather with a cough and cold, finished second in the event. Overall, Blair won 4 of 18 women's medals at the 1987 World Cup; East German skaters, including Rothenburger, won 13.

At the December 1987 U.S. speed skating trials for the 1988 Winter Olympics, Blair led the women's field in the 500,1,000, and 1,500 meters, securing her place on the U.S. Olympic team, as expected. Blair was considered a stronger competitor in the shorter distances, where she was seen as the United States' best chance at a gold medal in speed skating. U.S. speed skating failure to win a single medal at the 1984 Olympics added to the pressure and attention focused on Blair leading up to the 1988 games.

Blair went on to the 1988 Winter Olympics in Calgary, Alberta, where her first event was the 500 meters. Rothenburger skating first, setting a new world record. Blair responded to the challenge with her best start ever in the 500 meters, winning the gold medal in world record time of 39.10 seconds. For her second event of the games, Blair had a personal best and briefly set an Olympic record in the 1,000 meters. Two of Blair's competitors, who skated after her, subsequently beat her time; thus Blair won the bronze in the 1,000 meters. Blair's third and final event of the 1988 Winter Olympics was the 1,500 meters, in which she placed fourth. Blair's family friends in the stands, affectionately known as the "Blair Bunch," became a staple of her competitive career. To end the games, Blair was chosen to carry the American flag at the closing ceremonies.

Despite her success at the 1988 Olympics, Blair did not enjoy a windfall from endorsements. Holding Blair back from more advertisements was both her choice of sports, which was thought to be less marketable, and ABC's coverage of the games, which failed to resonate with viewers. Blair also took a break from skating, enrolling in Montana Technological University. She skipped the first two World Cup events of the 1989 season. Blair was back to competing later in the season and won the 1989 World Sprint Championships held in Heerenveen, Netherlands. At the event, Blair won the 500 meters twice and finished third and second in two 100 meters races for an overall victory. The win made Blair the first U.S. woman to win a world sprint championship in nearly a decade.

Following the 1988 Olympics, Blair also tried track cycle racing, and was coached by former speed skater and cycling world champion Connie Paraskevin. Cycling became part of Blair's speed skating training as both sports utilized the same muscle groups. She made her competitive cycling debut in June 1989 at the Sundance Juice Sparkler Grand Prix. After placing fourth at U.S. Nationals and missing the opportunity to compete at the World Championships, Blair opted to give up competitive cycling and focus solely on speed skating.

=== Repeat Olympic gold (1990–1992) ===
The 1990–1991 season had setbacks for Blair. She contracted a severe case of bronchitis that affected her breathing. The breathing problem lingered through the 1991 World Sprint Championships where she finished fifth. As confidence in coach Crowe had waned in the lead up to the 1988 Olympics, Blair helped to recruit Peter Mueller to coach the U.S. team. The coaching switch took place ten months before the 1992 Olympics. Training with Mueller in the summer before the Olympics, Blair regained her competitive edge.

Blair again competed at Olympics in 1992, this time held in Albertville, France. Although she had won gold at the prior Olympics, Blair felt that her small stature made her an underdog against much larger East German competitors. Blair again won gold in the 500 meters, becoming the first woman to win the event in back to back Olympics, with a time of 40.33 seconds. Her winning time was slower than her record setting pace in Calgary, however, the venue in Albertville was outdoors creating conditions which were less conducive for speed skating. The second-place finisher, Ye Qiaobo of China, claimed to have been slowed down by an improper crossover from another skater. Although Ye claimed the crossover cost her the gold, the referee's rejected China's protest. Blair dedicated her gold medal to her father, Charlie, who had died from lung cancer two years earlier. Charlie had dreamed of Bonnie becoming an Olympic speed skater.

In her second event, the 1,500 meters, Blair finished 21st. The placement was due in part to the strategy of her coach, Peter Mueller; Mueller told Blair he would give her a signal to coast if he felt she was not on pace for a podium finish, allowing her to conserve energy. As Blair approached the final 400 meters, Mueller gave the signal. Blair won her second gold of the 1992 Olympics in the 1,000 meters (1:21.90). Her time was only 0.02 seconds faster than Ye. Blair's gold made her the most decorated U.S. woman in Winter Olympics of all time.

Her success in the 1992 Olympics led to more attention for Blair. She was on the cover of Sports Illustrated. Blair also began to pick-up more endorsements, including sports marketing group Advantage International. After the Olympics, Blair moved to Milwaukee, Wisconsin to train at the newly opened Pettit International Ice Center.

=== Final Olympics (1993–1994) ===
Back in 1986, the International Olympic Committee voted to stage the Winter Olympics and Summer Olympics in alternating four year cycles. Thus, the next Winter Games would be held in February 1994. The attempt to compete at her fourth Olympics was not without its challenges; the 1993 season was lackluster for Blair. At the 1993 World Sprint Championships, Blair did not win any of her four races finishing behind rival Ye Qiabo. Blair felt as though she had lost her quickness and after failing to rectify the problem with coach Peter Mueller, she switched to Nick Thometz. At the 1994, U.S. Olympic long-track trials at the Pettit National Ice Center, Blair set track records in the first round of the 500 meter and 1,000 meter trails.

The 1994 Winter Olympics in Lillehammer, Norway, were another success for Blair: She again won gold in the 500 meters (39.25) and 1,000 meters (1:18.74) races. Blair finished 0.36 seconds ahead of the second best time in the 500 meters. Her 1.38 second margin in the 1,000 meters race is the largest margin of victory in the history of the event. Blair's success at Lillehammer placed her among the most decorated American Olympians of all time. She became the first American woman to win five gold Olympic medals and the first American Winter Olympian to win six career medals. In addition to the 500 and 1,000 meters races, Blair also competed in the 1,500 meter distance, missing the podium with a fourth-place finish. At her post race press conference, Blair confirmed Lillehammer would be her last Olympic games.

=== Post-Olympic career ===
After the 1994 Olympics, Blair continued to compete. Less than a month after Lillehammer Olympics, Blair set another world record in the 500 meters, becoming the first female to complete the race in under 39 seconds, achieving a time of 38.99 seconds. Blair topped her own World Record the following year, achieving a time of 38.69 on February 12, 1995, in Calgary. Blair continued on to the 1995 World Championships in her adopted home town of Milwaukee. The Blair Bunch, the name given to Blair's family and friends, accounted for 12% of the crowd at the Pettit National Ice Center. There, Blair won the 500 meters with a time of 39.54 seconds. On March 18, 1995, she retired.

After fellow speed skater Johann Olav Koss founded Right to Play in 2000, he recruited Blair to serve as one of the charities first celebrity ambassadors. Blair became involved with Right to Play, When the Winter Olympics returned to the United States in 2002, Blair was one of the final torchbearers to carry the Olympic flame into Rice-Eccles Stadium for the opening ceremony in Salt Lake City, Utah. As of 2002, Blair served on U.S. Speedskating's board of directors. As of 2014, Blair worked as a motivational speaker and corporate spokesperson. That same year she was a member of the U.S. Olympic delegation to Sochi. As of 2018, Blair serves on the board of the Pettit National Ice Center.

== Awards and honors ==
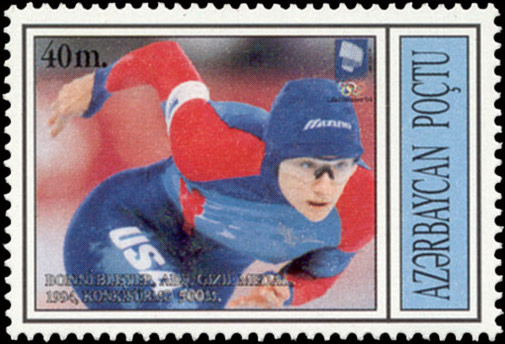
Bonnie Blair on Azerbaijani postage stamp, 1995

In 1992, Blair became the third winter athlete to win the Sullivan Award. Blair won the 1992 Oscar Mathisen Award, the first female winner of this award. In 1992, Blair received the Golden Plate Award of the American Academy of Achievement. She also was Female Athlete of the Year as selected by the Associated Press in 1994. Blair also won the World Cup points championship 11 times. Sports Illustrated named Blair their Sportswoman of the Year for 1994. By 1994, Blair's hometown of Champaign had renamed one of its streets Bonnie Blair Drive.

She is a member of the Chicagoland Sports Hall of Fame and the Wisconsin Athletic Hall of Fame. In 2004, she was elected to the United States Olympic Hall of Fame. She was awarded a star (#7) on The Flag for Hope on September 29, 2015, in recognition of her outstanding speed skating career and philanthropic efforts.

== Personal life ==
Blair began dating fellow Olympic speed skater Dave Cruikshank in 1990. The pair married in Milwaukee, Wisconsin in 1996. Blair and Cruikshank have two children: a son, Grant, and daughter, Blair. Grant Cruikshank played hockey at Colorado College and as of 2021 for the University of Minnesota. Blair's daughter competed at the 2018 United States Olympic speed skating trials at the 500 meter distance, held at Pettit National Ice Center. In 2021, Blair spoke out in opposition to allowing male-to-female transgender athletes to participate in organized athletics.

== See also ==
- List of multiple Olympic gold medalists
- List of multiple Olympic gold medalists in one event
- West Allis Speedskating Club

Awards
Preceded by (Norway) Johann Olav Koss	Oscar Mathisen Award; 1992	Succeeded by (Netherlands) Falko Zandstra
Preceded by (Romania) Nadia Comăneci	Flo Hyman Memorial Award; 1999	Succeeded by (United States) Monica Seles
