= Kristen Talbot =

American speed skater

Personal information
- Full name: Kristen Michele Talbot
- Born: September 24, 1970 (age 55) Schuylerville, New York, United States

Sport
- Country: United States
- Sport: Speed skating

Kristen Talbot (born 24 November 1970) is an American speed skater. She was a member of the US Olympic team at the 1988 Winter Olympics, 1992 Winter Olympics and 1994 Winter Olympics. She graduated from Skidmore College.

In preparation for the 1994 Winter Olympics, Talbot took time away from training to donate her bone marrow to her brother, Jason, who was severely affected by aplastic anemia.
