= Josh Thompson (biathlete) =

American biathlete & pilot (born 1962)

Joshua Casey Thompson (born in Lawrence, Kansas on February 28, 1962) is a retired American biathlete and pilot. He was educated at Colorado Rocky Mountain School and Western State Colorado University, attending the latter on an athletic scholarship and leading them to a national collegiate cross-country title. He initially enjoyed success at junior level as a cross-country skier before switching to biathlon after first coming across the sport while competing at the junior national cross-country championships in 1980. His silver at the 20 km race of the Biathlon World Championships 1987 was the best place a US biathlete had achieved at that point. He never won an Olympic medal but finished sixteenth at the 1992 Winter Olympics in Albertville, France, which was a good showing for Americans at that time. As the sport was not popular in the US at that time he was said to be better known in Europe than in his homeland. He has since become a pilot in Gunnison, Colorado.
