= Bill Carow (biathlete) =

American biathlete (born 1958)

Personal information
- Born: June 26, 1958 (age 68) Brattleboro, Vermont, United States

Sport
- Sport: Biathlon

Bill Carow (born June 26, 1958) is an American biathlete. He competed at the 1984 Winter Olympics and the 1988 Winter Olympics.
