= Darin Binning =

American biathlete (born 1966)

Personal information
- Born: May 5, 1966 (age 60) Rock Springs, Wyoming, United States

Sport
- Sport: Biathlon

Darin Binning (born May 5, 1966) is an American biathlete. He competed in the 20 km individual event at the 1988 Winter Olympics.
