= Karin Enke =

German speed skater

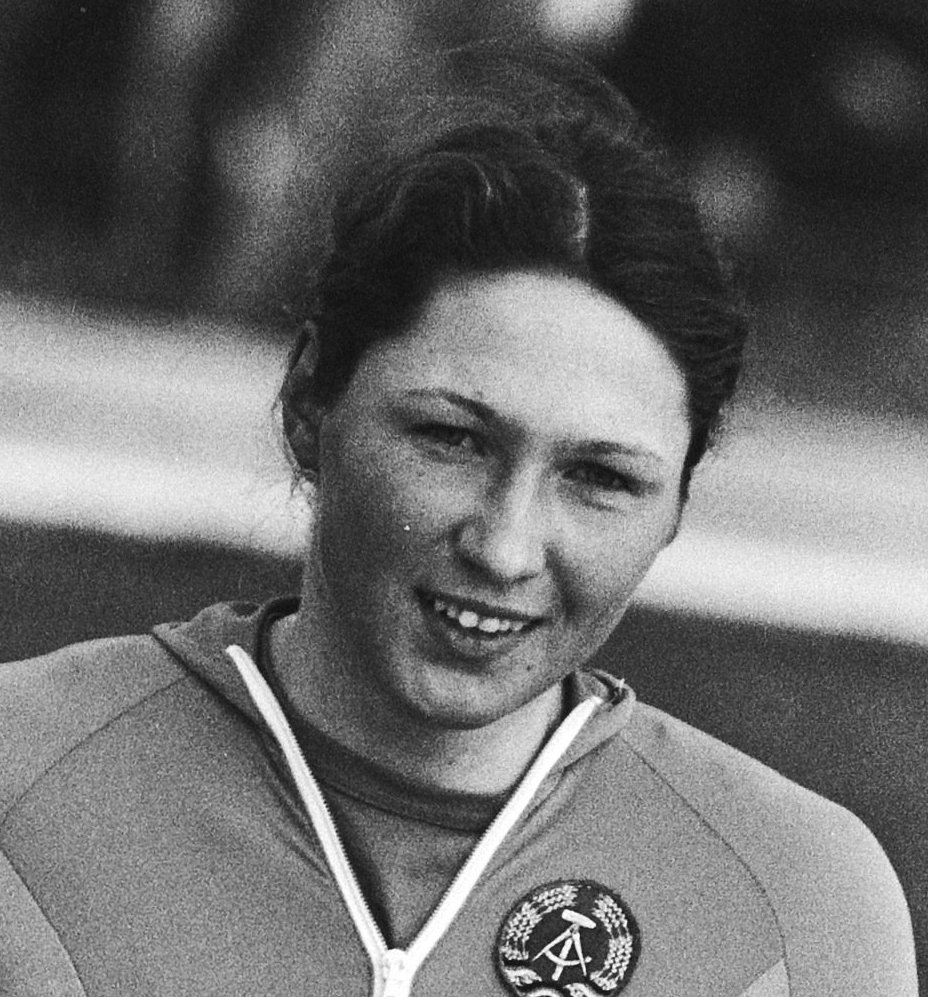
- Enke in 1983

Personal information
- Born: 20 June 1961 (age 65) Dresden, East Germany
- Height: 1.80 m (5 ft 11 in)
- Weight: 72 kg (159 lb)

Sport
- Sport: Speed skating
- Club: SC Einheit Dresden
Medal record
Women's speed skating
Representing East Germany
Olympic Games
| Gold medal – first place | 1980 Lake Placid | 500 m |
| Gold medal – first place | 1984 Sarajevo | 1000 m |
| Gold medal – first place | 1984 Sarajevo | 1500 m |
| Silver medal – second place | 1984 Sarajevo | 500 m |
| Silver medal – second place | 1984 Sarajevo | 3000 m |
| Silver medal – second place | 1988 Calgary | 1000 m |
| Silver medal – second place | 1988 Calgary | 1500 m |
| Bronze medal – third place | 1988 Calgary | 500 m |

Karin Mayer (née Enke, formerly Busch, Kania and Richter; born 20 June 1961) is a former speed skater, one of the most dominant of the 1980s. She is a three-time Olympic gold medallist, winning the 500 metres in 1980, the 1000 metres in 1984 and the 1500 metres in 1984. She won a total of eight Olympic medals, representing East Germany.

== Short biography ==
Karin Enke started her sport career as a figure skater at the club SC Einheit Dresden. Representing East Germany she came in ninth place at the European Figure Skating Championships in 1977. Later she changed to speed skating. Dominant on all distances (being reigning World Allround Champion and World Sprint Champion, and having won German Single Distance Championships titles on all five distances in 1983), Enke was the favourite for all four distances at the 1984 Winter Olympics of Sarajevo, but she won "only" two gold and two silver medals. At the World Cup, Enke had 21 single-distance victories, but won only one overall World Cup. She retired from speed skating after the 1987–88 season.

Born as Karin Enke, she married in 1981 and competed as Karin Busch during the 1981–82 winter. The marriage did not last long and during the 1982–83 and 1983–84 winters, she competed as Karin Enke again. After marrying her longtime former trainer Rudolf Kania in 1984, she competed as Karin Kania for the rest of her speed skating career. After her career had ended, she divorced and married again and became Karin Enke-Richter.

Like several other female East German skaters who got married after the season had ended (and several of them more than once over the course of their careers), Enke caused some confusion among the speed skating public when she—a skater with a name unfamiliar to them—suddenly won major titles in her "first" season. To alleviate the confusion, Enke kept her maiden name as the first part of her last name after her third marriage, just like Gunda Kleemann (also known as Gunda Niemann and Gunda Niemann-Stirnemann) kept Niemann (the name of her first husband) as the first part of her last name even after her divorce and both before and after her second marriage, which is unusual in most Western European countries.

== Doping use ==
On 3 January 2010, Giselher Spitzer, a German sport historian and researcher of the Humboldt University of Berlin, claimed in the Dutch TV documentary Andere Tijden ('Other Times') that back in 1984, Karin Enke had been prepared with doping. He based his claim on Stasi-documents, which were shown during the programme. Citation: "[Dem Arzt] war bekannt, dass Karin ENKE zu den Olympischen Spielen zu den ausgewählten Athleten gehörte, die mit erheblichen Mengen Testosteron und gleichzeitigen Gegenspritzen von Epitestosteron auf ihre Wettkämpfe vorbereitet würden." ("It was known to the medic, that Karin ENKE at the Olympic Games belonged to those athletes who were prepared for the Games with relevant measures of Testosteron and, synchronously, with contrasting measures of Epitosteron.").

== Medals ==
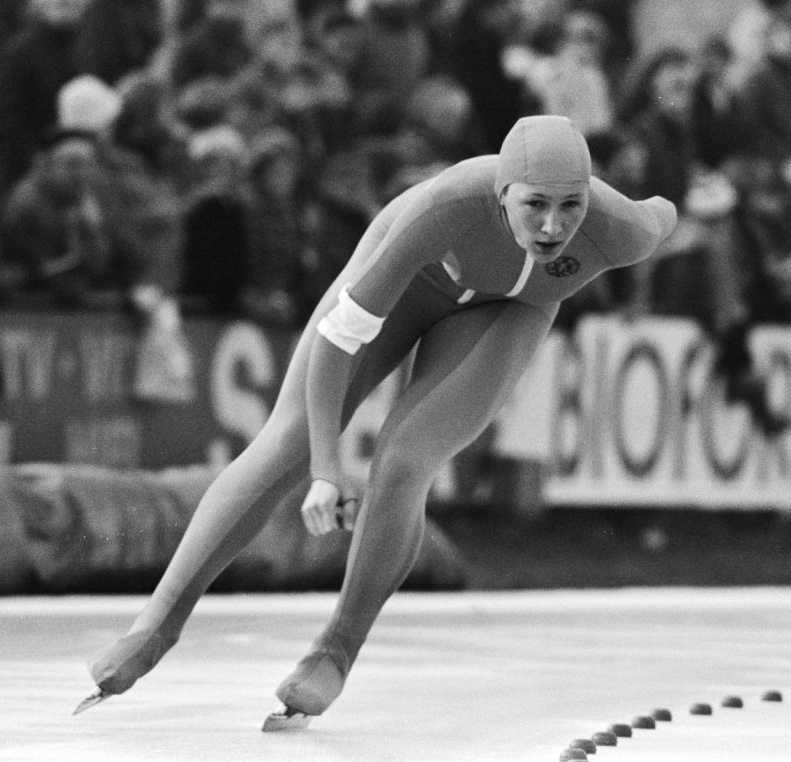
Karin Enke at the European Championships in 1983

An overview of medals won by Enke at important championships she participated in, listing the years in which she won each:

| Championships | Gold medal | Silver medal | Bronze medal |
|---|---|---|---|
| Winter Olympics | 1980 (500 m); 1984 (1000 m); 1984 (1500 m) | 1984 (500 m); 1984 (3000 m); 1988 (1000 m); 1988 (1500 m) | 1988 (500 m) |
| World Allround | 1982; 1984; 1986; 1987; 1988 | 1981; 1983 | |
| World Sprint | 1980; 1981; 1983; 1984; 1986; 1987 | 1982; 1988 | |
| World Cup | 1986 (1000 m) | 1986 (500 m); 1986 (1500 m); 1988 (1000 m) | 1986 (3000/5000 m); 1988 (500 m); 1988 (1500 m); 1988 (3000/5000 m) |
| European Allround | | 1981; 1982; 1983 | |
| German Allround | 1982; 1983 | | |
| German Sprint | 1984; 1986 | 1983 | |
| German Single Distance | 1980 (1000 m); 1983 (500 m); 1983 (1000 m); 1983 (1500 m); 1983 (3000 m); 1983 (5000 m); 1984 (500 m); 1984 (1000 m); 1984 (1500 m); 1986 (1000 m); 1987 (500 m); 1988 (1000 m); 1988 (1500 m) | 1980 (1500 m); 1986 (500 m); 1986 (1500 m); 1986 (3000 m); 1988 (500 m) | 1980 (500 m) |

== World records ==
Over the course of her career, Enke skated 10 world records:

| Distance | Result | Date | Location |
|---|---|---|---|
| Mini combination | 168.271 | 14 February 1982 | Inzell |
| 1500 m | 2:03.42 | 9 February 1984 | Sarajevo |
| 1000 m | 1:18.84 | 22 February 1986 | Karuizawa |
| Sprint combination | 160.060 | 23 February 1986 | Karuizawa |
| 1500 m | 2:02.23 | 6 March 1986 | Inzell |
| 3000 m | 4:18.02 | 21 March 1986 | Medeo |
| 500 m | 39.52 | 21 March 1986 | Medeo |
| 1500 m | 1:59.30 | 22 March 1986 | Medeo |
| Mini combination | 168.387 | 22 March 1986 | Inzell |
| 1000 m | 1:18.11 | 5 December 1987 | Calgary |

== Personal records ==
To put these personal records in perspective, the last column (WR) lists the official world records on the dates that Enke skated her personal records.

| Distance | Result | Date | Location | WR |
|---|---|---|---|---|
| 500 m | 39.24 | 22 February 1988 | Calgary | 39.39 |
| 1000 m | 1:17.70 | 26 February 1988 | Calgary | 1:18.11 |
| 1500 m | 1:59.30 | 22 March 1986 | Medeo | 2:02.23 |
| 3000 m | 4:17.76 | 5 December 1987 | Calgary | 4:16.85 |
| 5000 m | 7:39.82 | 22 March 1986 | Medeo | 7:31.45 |
| Small combination | 168.272 | 22 March 1986 | Medeo | 171.760 |
| Mini combination | 168.271 | 14 February 1982 | Inzell | 168.387 |
| Sprint combination | 160.060 | 23 February 1986 | Karuizawa | 161.120 |

Note that Enke's personal record on the 500 m was not a world record because Bonnie Blair skated 39.10 at the same tournament (the 1988 Winter Olympics). Enke's personal record on the 1000 m was not a world record either because (again at the same 1988 Winter Olympics) Christa Rothenburger skated 1:17.65 – 0.05 seconds faster.
