= Stéphanie Dumont =

French speed skater (born 1968)

Personal information
- Full name: Stéphanie Dominique Dumont
- Born: February 5, 1968 (age 58)
- Children: Jules Dumont-Haug, Louis Dumont-Haug, Charles Dumont-Haug

Sport
- Country: France
- Sport: speed skating

Stéphanie Dumont (born 5 February 1968) is a French former speed skater. She represented France at the 1988 Winter Olympics in the speed skating event.
