= Yvonne van Gennip =

Dutch speed skater (born 1964)

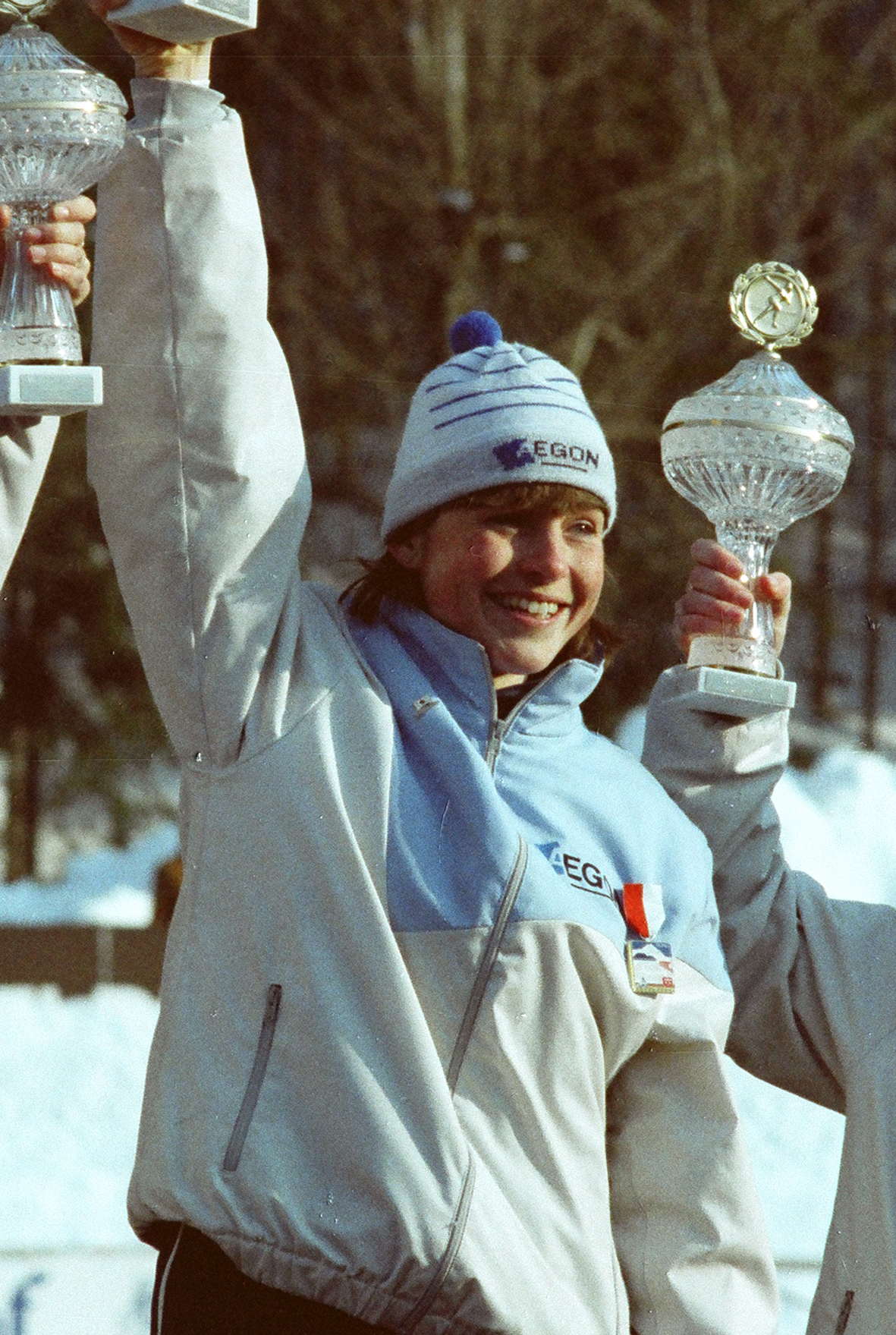
- Yvonne van Gennip (1987)

Personal information
- Born: 1 May 1964 (age 62) Haarlem, Netherlands
- Height: 1.66 m (5 ft 5 1/2 in)
- Weight: 66 kg (146 lb)

Sport
- Country: Netherlands
- Sport: Speed skating
- Club: IJsclub Haarlem
- Turned pro: 1983
Medal record
Women's speed skating
Representing the Netherlands
Olympic Games
Gold medal – first place	1988 Calgary	1500 m
Gold medal – first place	1988 Calgary	3000 m
Gold medal – first place	1988 Calgary	5000 m
World Championships
Silver medal – second place	1988 Skien	Allround
Bronze medal – third place	1987 West Allis	Allround
Bronze medal – third place	1989 Lake Placid	Allround
European Championships
Silver medal – second place	1985 Groningen	Allround
Silver medal – second place	1986 Geihus	Allround
Silver medal – second place	1987 Groningen	Allround
Bronze medal – third place	1988 Kongsberg	Allround
Bronze medal – third place	1991 Sarajevo	Allround
World Junior Championships
Silver medal – second place	1982 Innsbruck	Allround
Bronze medal – third place	1981 Elverum	Allround

Yvonne Maria Therèse van Gennip (born 1 May 1964) is one of the most successful female Dutch all-round speed skaters. Her main success dates from the 1988 Winter Olympics in Calgary, where she unexpectedly won three gold medals. She was the most successful athlete at the 1988 Winter Olympics, along with Matti Nykänen of Finland.

After she had injured her foot, and had surgery less than two months before the games, the East German women were heavily favoured to win the distances over 500 meters. But Van Gennip smashed the world record by almost five seconds to win the 3000 metres, beat her personal record by almost 4 seconds to win the 1500 metres, and was almost seven seconds faster than her own world record time to win the 5000 metres as well.

Van Gennip participated in the 1984 Winter Olympics in Sarajevo and in the 1992 Winter Olympics in Albertville as well, but did not win a medal. She won a silver medal in the 1988 World Speed Skating Championships, and bronze medals in the 1987 and 1989 World Championships.

== Early life ==
Van Gennip was born on 1 May 1964 in Haarlem, the daughter of Johannes Gerardus van Gennip (22 April 1922 – 30 September 1999) and Reina Elisabeth Mettes (20 May 1924 – 15 March 2013).

She married bank director Gert van Kuijk on 15 August 2002 in Zandvoort, the couple divorced in 2009. Since 2010 she has been in a relationship with Jaap de Groot, lead editor for sports for De Telegraaf.

== Records ==
=== Personal records ===
Personal records
Speed skating
Event	Result	Date	Location	Notes
500 m	41.54	19 March 1987	Thialf, Heerenveen	
1000 m	1:21.21	12 February 1989	Olympic Oval, Calgary	
1500 m	2:00.68	27 February 1988	Olympic Oval, Calgary	
3000 m	4:11.94	23 February 1988	Olympic Oval, Calgary	
5000 m	7:14.13	28 February 1988	Olympic Oval, Calgary	
10000 m	15:25.25	19 March 1988	Thialf, Heerenveen	

=== World records ===
Distance	Time	Date	Location
3000 m	4:16.85	19 March 1987	Thialf, Heerenveen
5000 m	7:20.35	20 March 1987	Thialf, Heerenveen
3000 m	4:11.94	23 February 1988	Olympic Oval, Calgary
5000 m	7:14.13	28 February 1988	Olympic Oval, Calgary

== Achievements ==
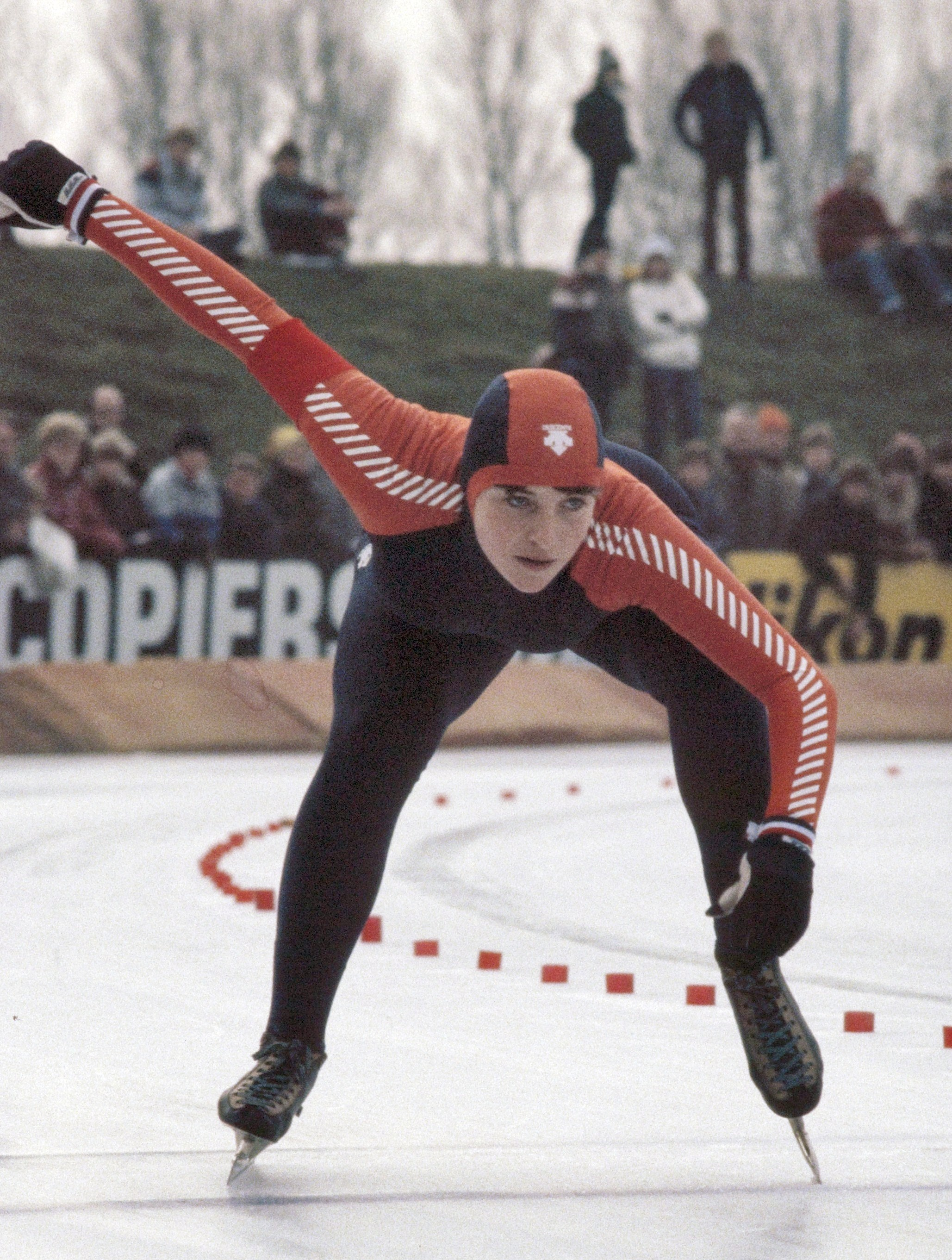
Yvonne van Gennip at the World Sprint Championships in 1982; start of 500 m

Olympic Games
1500 m	11th	Sarajevo	YUG	9 Feb	1984
1000 m	6th	Sarajevo	YUG	13 Feb	1984
3000 m	5th	Sarajevo	YUG	15 Feb	1984
3000 m	Gold	Calgary	CAN	23 Feb	1988
1500 m	Gold	Calgary	CAN	27 Feb	1988
5000 m	Gold	Calgary	CAN	28 Feb	1988
1500 m	NF	Albertville	FRA	12 Feb	1992
3000 m	6th	Albertville	FRA	9 Feb	1992
5000 m	NS	Albertville	FRA	17 Feb	1992
World Allround Championships
1984	12th	Deventer	NED	29 Jan.	1984
1985	4th	Sarajevo	YUG	10 Feb.	1985
1986	4th	The Hague	NED	9 Feb.	1986
1987	Bronze	West Allis	U.S.	8 Feb.	1987
1988	Silver	Skien	NOR	13 Mar.	1988
1989	Bronze	Lake Placid	U.S.	5 Feb.	1989
1991	5th	Hamar	NOR	3 Feb.	1991
World Sprint Championships
1982	4th	Alkmaar	NED	7 Feb.	1982
1983	25th	Helsinki	FIN	27 Feb.	1983
1984	14th	Trondheim	NOR	4 Mar.	1984
1987	10th	Sainte Foy	CAN	1 Feb.	1987
European Allround Championships
1984	11th	Medeo	URS	15 Jan.	1984
1985	Silver	Groningen	NED	13 Jan.	1985
1986	Silver	Geithus	NOR	12 Jan.	1986
1987	Silver	Groningen	NED	18 Jan.	1987
1988	Bronze	Kongsberg	NOR	17 Jan.	1988
1989	5th	West Berlin	—	15 Jan.	1989
1991	Bronze	Sarajevo	YUG	20 Jan.	1991
1992	4th	Heerenveen	NED	19 Jan.	1992
World Junior Allround Championships
1981	Bronze	Elverum	NOR	1 Mar.	1981
1982	Silver	Innsbruck	AUT	28 Feb.	1982

== See also ==
- List of multiple Olympic gold medalists at a single Games

Awards and achievements
Preceded by Irene de Kok	Dutch Sportswoman of the Year; 1988	Succeeded by Elly van Hulst
