= Bibija Kerla =

Bosnian speed skater

Personal information
- Nationality: Bosnian
- Born: 23 October 1959 (age 65)

Sport
- Sport: Speed skating

Bibija Kerla (born 23 October 1959) is a Bosnian speed skater. She competed at the 1984 Winter Olympics and the 1988 Winter Olympics, representing Yugoslavia.
