= Yelena Lapuga =

Soviet speed skater

Personal information
- Nationality: Soviet
- Born: 17 May 1964 (age 60); Pavlodar, Soviet Union

Sport
- Sport: Speed skating

Yelena Lapuga (born 17 May 1964) is a Soviet speed skater. She competed at the 1988 Winter Olympics and the 1992 Winter Olympics.
