= Zofia Tokarczyk =

Polish speed skater

Personal information
- Nationality: Polish
- Born: 17 April 1963 (age 63) Nowy Sącz, Poland

Sport
- Sport: Speed skating

Zofia Tokarczyk (born 17 April 1963) is a Polish speed skater. She competed at the 1984 Winter Olympics and the 1988 Winter Olympics.

== Early life ==
Tokarczyk was born in Nowy Sącz, Poland on 17 April 1963 and was raised in Zakopane. She studied at the School of Sporting Excellence and was competed for the club AZS Zakopane.
