= Jane Goldman (speed skater) =

American speed skater

Personal information
- Born: September 16, 1964 (age 60); Skokie, Illinois, United States

Sport
- Sport: Speed skating

Jane Goldman (born September 16, 1964) is an American speed skater. She competed at the 1984 Winter Olympics and the 1988 Winter Olympics.
