= Edel Therese Høiseth =

Norwegian speed skater

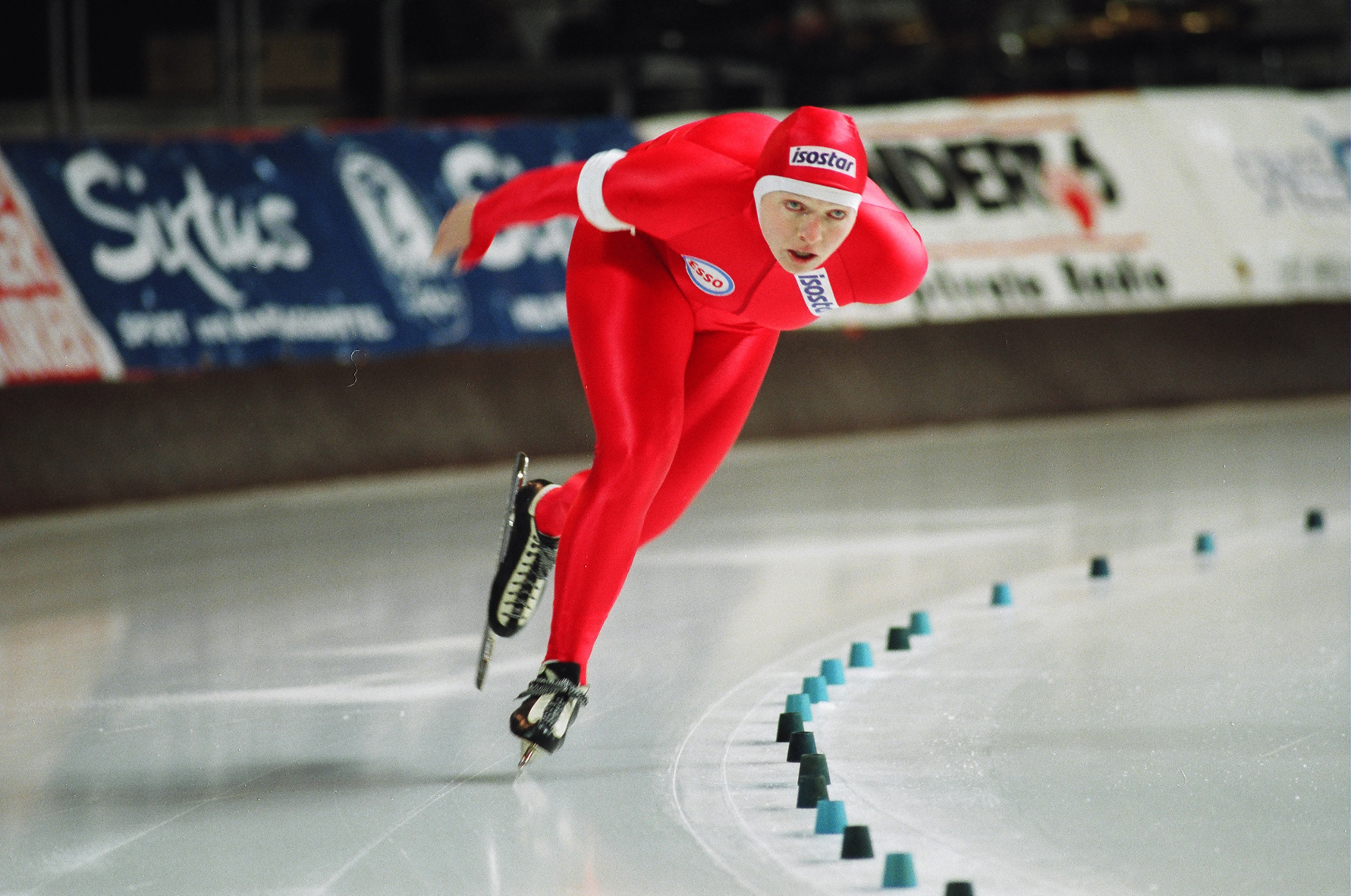
Edel Therese Høiseth

Edel Therese Høiseth (born 27 January 1966) is a former speed skater from Norway, who specialised in the shorter distances; the 500 m and 1,000 m.

Høiseth skated in all Winter Olympics from 1984 to 1998, making her one of only three Norwegians to have participated in as many as five Winter Olympics (the other two being Oddvar Brå and Petter Thoresen). Her best Olympic result is an eighth place on the 500 m at the 1994 Winter Olympics. One of her best seasons was 1996, when she won the silver medal at the World Sprint Championships behind Chris Witty. Throughout her unusually long career at international top level, she also won more than 40 Norwegian Championships in Allround, Sprint, and Single Distance (500 m, 1,000 m, and 1,500 m). In 2000, on two occasions in Calgary, she achieved times of 1:15.37 and 1:15.47 on the 1,000 m; the world record at that time was Monique Garbrecht's 1:14.61. Høiseth's best 500 m time is 38.40.

== Medals ==
An overview of medals won by Høiseth at important championships she participated in, listing the years in which she won each:

Championships	Gold medal	Silver medal	Bronze medal
Winter Olympics	–	–	–
World Allround	–	–	–
World Sprint	–	1996	–
World Single Distance	–	–	–
World Cup	–	1996 (1,000 m); 2000 (1,000 m)	1986 (500 m); 1987 (500 m)
European Allround	–	–	–

== Personal records ==
To put these personal records in perspective, the WR column lists the official world records on the dates that Høiseth skated her personal records.

Event	Result	Date	Venue	WR
500 m	38.40	29 January 2000	Calgary	37.55
1,000 m	1:15.37	30 January 2000	Calgary	1:14.61
1,500 m	1:59.97	17 March 2000	Calgary	1:55.50
3,000 m	4:29.50	29 March 1999	Calgary	4:01.67
5,000 m	8:13.13	19 December 1999	Hamar	6:57.24

Høiseth has an Adelskalender score of 172.619 points.
