= Christa Luding-Rothenburger =

German cyclist and speed skater

Christa Luding
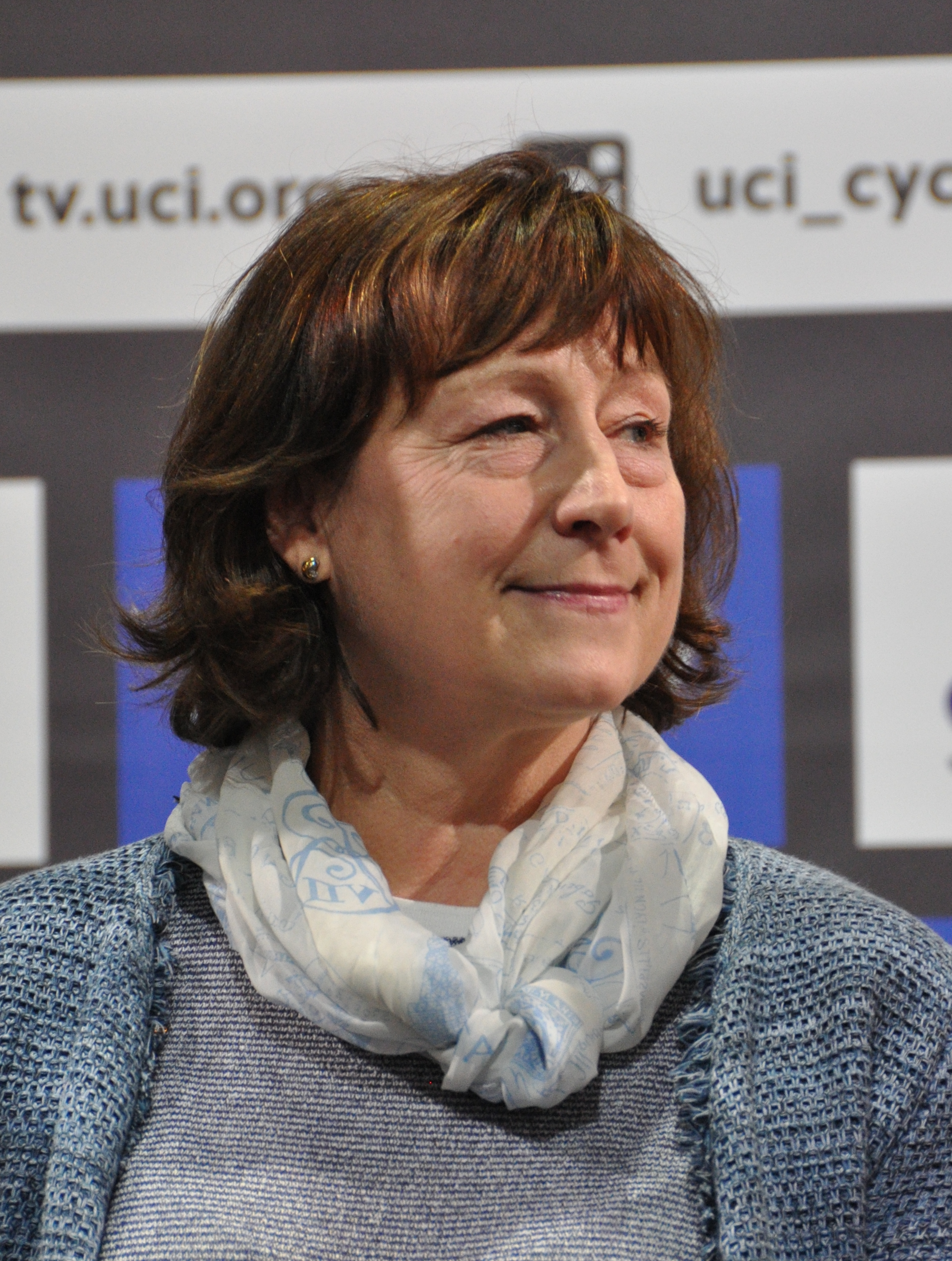
- Luding-Rothenburger in 2020

Personal information
- Born: 4 December 1959 (age 66) Weißwasser, Bezirk Cottbus, East Germany

Sport
- Country: East Germany
- Sport: Speed skating
Medal record
Women's speed skating
Representing East Germany
Olympic Games
Gold medal – first place	1984 Sarajevo	500 m
Gold medal – first place	1988 Calgary	1000 m
Silver medal – second place	1988 Calgary	500 m
Representing Germany
Bronze medal – third place	1992 Albertville	500 m
Women's track cycling
Representing East Germany
Olympic Games
Silver medal – second place	1988 Seoul	Sprint
World Championships
Gold medal – first place	1986 Colorado Springs	Sprint

Christa Luding-Rothenburger (née Rothenburger; born 4 December 1959) is a former German speed skater and track cyclist. She was born in Weißwasser, East Germany. Luding is one of the few athletes who have competed in both the Summer and Winter Olympic Games, and the first female to win a medal in both the Summer and Winter Games. She is the only athlete to win Winter and Summer Olympic medals in the same year (1988), a feat that is no longer possible due to the staggering of the Winter and Summer Olympic years. In speed skating, she is a two-time Olympic gold medallist, while she is an Olympic silver medallist in cycling.

== Biography ==
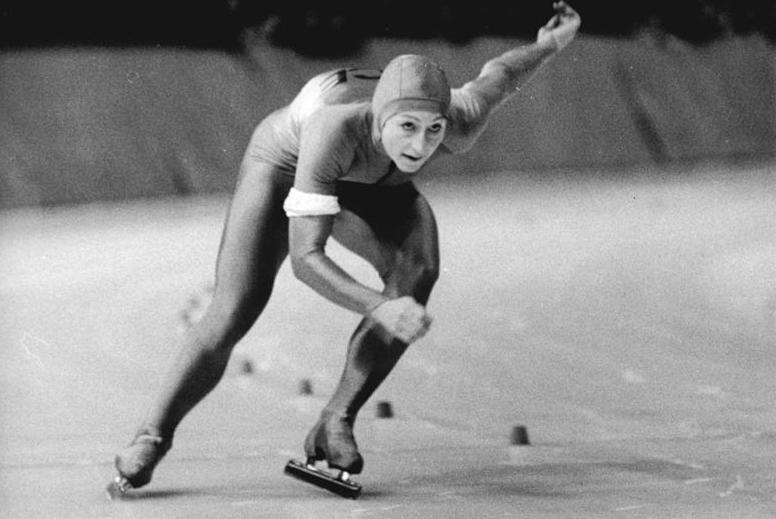
Luding-Rothenburger in 1988

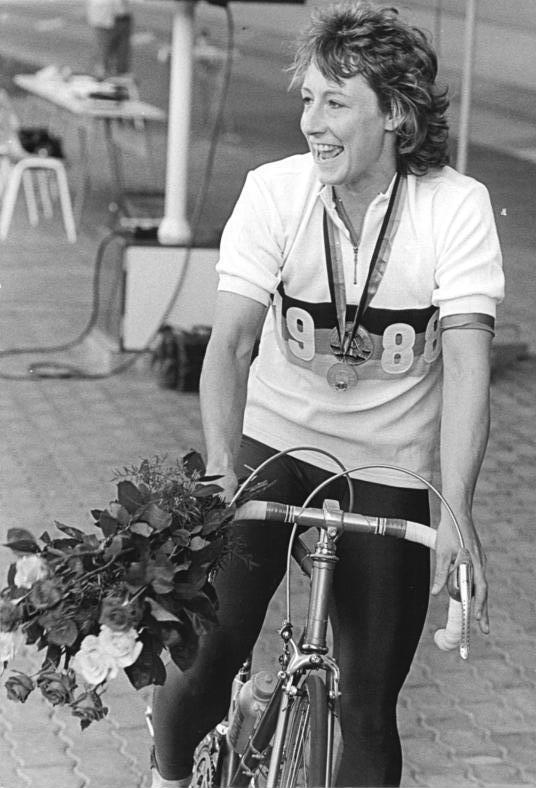
Luding-Rothenburger in 1988

Before the German reunification in 1990, Luding competed for East Germany – afterwards for Germany. For more than 10 years, she was one of the world's best sprinters in speed skating. At the World Sprint Championships in speed skating, she became world champion twice (in 1985 and 1988), won silver twice (in 1986 and 1989), and won 4 bronze medals (in 1979, 1983, 1987 and 1992). She has also won the 500 m World Cup 3 times (in 1986, 1988 and 1989) and the 1000 m World Cup once (in 1988).

In 1980, she was convinced by her coach, Ernst Luding (whom she would marry after the 1988 Winter Olympics), to take up cycling during the off-season. First she was told to stick to skating, but finally the president of the East German sports federation gave her permission to enter international cycling competitions. At the 1986 World Cycling Championships, she won track cycling gold in the women's sprint and silver the following year. This made her the second woman (after Sheila Young) to become world champion in both speed skating and cycling. In October 1986, she was awarded a Star of People's Friendship in gold (second class) for her sporting success.

In 1988, she earned the distinction of being the only athlete to win Summer and Winter Olympic medals in the same year. It also made her the first woman, and the third athlete overall, to win a medal in both the Summer and Winter Olympics. At the Winter Games in Calgary, Alberta, Canada, she won the gold medal in the 1000 m speed skating event and silver in the 500 m. Seven months later, she won the silver medal in the (1000 m) sprint in track cycling at the Summer Games in Seoul, South Korea.

After winning a bronze medal at the 1992 World Sprint Championships (in which she was unable to win any of the 4 distances), Luding-Rothenburger ended her speed skating career.

== Medals ==
An overview of medals won by Rothenburger at important championships she participated in, listing the years in which she won each:

Championships	Gold medal	Silver medal	Bronze medal
Speed skating
Winter Olympics	1984 (500 m); 1988 (1000 m)	1988 (500 m)	1992 (500 m)
World Sprint	1985; 1988	1986; 1989	1979; 1983; 1987; 1992
World Cup	1986 (500 m); 1988 (500 m); 1988 (1000 m); 1989 (500 m)	1986 (1000 m); 1989 (500 m)	
German Sprint	1981; 1982; 1983; 1992	1978; 1979; 1988	1977
German Single Distance	1980 (500 m); 1985 (500 m); 1986 (500 m); 1988 (500 m); 1989 (500 m); 1991 (500 m); 1991 (1000 m)	1980 (1000 m); 1984 (500 m); 1986 (1000 m); 1988 (1000 m); 1989 (1000 m)	1983 (500 m); 1983 (1000 m); 1984 (1000 m)
Track cycling
Summer Olympics		1988 (Sprint)	
World Sprint	1986	1987	

== World records ==
Over the course of her career, Rothenburger skated 8 world records:

Distance	Result	Date	Location
500 m	40.28	27 March 1981	Medeo
1000 m	1:20.95	27 March 1981	Medeo
500 m	40.18	28 March 1981	Medeo
Sprint combination	162.275	28 March 1981	Medeo
500 m	39.69	25 March 1983	Medeo
Sprint combination	161.120	26 March 1983	Medeo
500 m	39.39	6 December 1987	Calgary
1000 m	1:17.65	26 February 1988	Calgary

== Personal records ==
Distance	Result	Date	Location
500 m	39.12	22 February 1988	Calgary
1000 m	1:17.65	26 February 1988	Calgary
1500 m	2:05.83	16 January 1988	Davos
3000 m	4:50.59	17 January 2010	Davos
Mini combination	176.227	17 January 1982	Davos
Sprint combination	159.500	26 February 1989	Heerenveen

== See also ==
- List of multi-sport athletes
- List of multi-sport champions
- List of multiple Olympic medalists
