= Natalie Grenier =

Canadian speed skater

Personal information
- Nationality: Canadian
- Born: March 11, 1964 (age 62) Quebec City, Quebec

Sport
- Country: Canada
- Sport: Speed skating

Natalie Grenier (born March 11, 1964) is a former Canadian female speed skater. She competed at the 1984 Winter Olympics and 1988 Winter Olympics representing Canada.

In the 1988 Winter Olympics, she chose not to take part in the women's 3000m event due to a case of the Flu which had spread throughout the Olympic Village, in order to ensure optimal results in her upcoming best races, the 1000m and 1500m events. At the time, Grenier was engaged to the popular American speed skating world champion, Dan Jansen.
