= Leslie Bader =

American speed skater

Personal information
- Born: November 10, 1963 (age 61); Monroe, Connecticut, United States

Sport
- Sport: Speed skating

Leslie Bader (born November 10, 1963) is an American speed skater. She competed in four events at the 1988 Winter Olympics.
