= Andrea Ehrig-Mitscherlich =

German speed skater

Andrea Ehrig
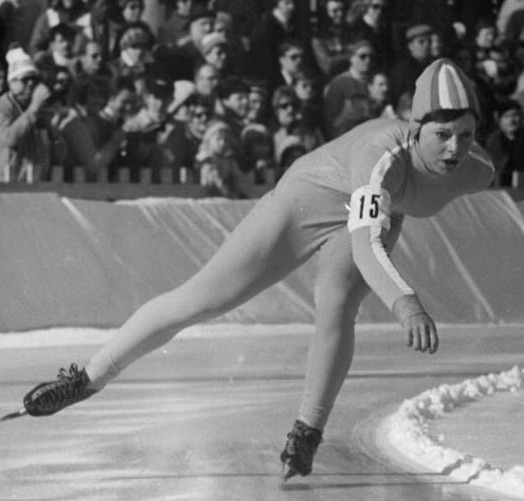
- Competing as Andrea Mitscherlich in 1977

Personal information
- Born: 1 December 1960 (age 65) Dresden, East Germany
- Height: 1.65 m (5 ft 5 in)
- Weight: 58 kg (128 lb)

Sport
- Sport: Speed skating
- Club: SC Einheit Dresden
Medal record
Women's speed skating
Representing East Germany
Olympic Games
Gold medal – first place	1984 Sarajevo	3000 metres
Silver medal – second place	1976 Innsbruck	3000 metres
Silver medal – second place	1984 Sarajevo	1000 metres
Silver medal – second place	1984 Sarajevo	1500 metres
Silver medal – second place	1988 Calgary	3000 metres
Silver medal – second place	1988 Calgary	5000 metres
Bronze medal – third place	1988 Calgary	1500 metres
World Championships
Gold medal – first place	1983 Chemnitz	Allround
Gold medal – first place	1985 Sarajevo	Allround
Silver medal – second place	1982 Inzell	Allround
Silver medal – second place	1984 Deventer	Allround
Silver medal – second place	1986 The Hague	Allround
Silver medal – second place	1987 West-Allis	Allround
European Championships
Gold medal – first place	1983 Heerenveen	Allround
Gold medal – first place	1985 Groningen	Allround
Gold medal – first place	1986 Geithus	Allround
Gold medal – first place	1987 Groningen	Allround
Gold medal – first place	1988 Kongsberg	Allround

Andrea Ehrig (née Mitscherlich, also known as Schöne, born 1 December 1960) is a retired East German speed skater. She was one of the world's best long-distance skaters in the 1980s. A four-time Olympian, she won seven Olympic medals, including gold in the 3000 metres (as Andrea Schöne) at the 1984 Sarajevo Games.

== Career ==
Ehrig was born Andrea Mitscherlich in Dresden, Saxony, East Germany. At the 1976 Olympics in Innsbruck, as a 15-year-old, she won a silver medal in the 3000 m event, just one one-hundredth of a second ahead of Lisbeth Korsmo who won bronze. At the 1980 Olympics in Lake Placid she came fourth in the 3000 metres. Four years later at the 1984 Olympics in Sarajevo, competing under her first married name of Schöne, she won silver in both the 1000 and the 1500 m and became Olympic champion in the 3000 metres. In 1988, at her fourth and final Olympic Games in Calgary, competing as Andrea Ehrig, she won two more silver medals in the long distances, and a bronze medal in the 1500 metres. She became European champion five times and World Champion twice, in 1983 and 1985. Between 1983 and 1987 she set 10 world records in 1500–10,000 m events.

Ehrig was married twice. After the 1980 Winter Olympics, she married the rower Ingolf Schöne and towards the end of that year, it was announced that she was expecting their child. She married a second time in 1985 to fellow Olympic speed skater Andreas Ehrig.

Personal bests:

- 500 m – 40.71 (1988)
- 1000 m – 1:19.32 (1988)
- 1500 m – 2:01.00 (1986)
- 3000 m – 4:12.09 (1988)
- 5000 m – 7:17.12 (1988)
