= Biathlon at the 1988 Winter Olympics – Relay =

Men's biathlon relay at the XV Olympic Winter Games
- Venue: Canmore Nordic Centre
- Dates: 26 February 1988
- Competitors: 64 from 16 nations
- Winning time: 1:22:30.0

Medalists
1st place, gold medalist(s)		Soviet Union; Dmitry Vasilyev; Sergei Tchepikov; Alexandr Popov; Valeriy Medvedtsev
2nd place, silver medalist(s)		West Germany; Ernst Reiter; Stefan Höck; Peter Angerer; Fritz Fischer
3rd place, bronze medalist(s)		Italy; Werner Kiem; Gottlieb Taschler; Johann Passler; Andreas Zingerle

The men's 4 × 7.5 kilometre biathlon relay competition at the 1988 Winter Olympics 23 February, at Canmore Nordic Centre. Each national team consisted of four members, with each skiing 7.5 kilometres and shooting twice, once prone and once standing.

At each shooting station, a competitor has eight shots to hit five targets; however, only five bullets are loaded in a magazine at one – if additional shots are required, the spare bullets must be loaded one at a time. If after the eight shots are taken, there are still targets not yet hit, the competitor must ski a 150-metre penalty loop.

== Summary ==
The East German team were defending world champions, and had won at least a silver medal in every major competition of the 80s except for the 1984 Olympic race. In Calgary, they again failed to medal, missing three early shots to fall well behind. With the East Germans in trouble, the Soviets were able to pull away and win by more than a minute. This was the sixth consecutive relay win for the Soviet Union, and with the country dissolving before the 1992 Games, this win ensured that the Soviet Union never lost an Olympic relay. West Germany and Italy, the two teams that claimed bronze medals behind the top two teams at the 1986 and 1987 World Championships, rounded out the medals in Calgary.

== Results ==
Rank	Bib	Team	Penalties (P+S)	Result	Deficit
1st place, gold medalist(s)	3	Soviet Union; Dmitry Vasilyev; Sergei Tchepikov; Alexandr Popov; Valeriy Medvedtsev	0; 0 0; 0 0; 0 0; 0 0	1:22:30.0; 21:04.3; 20:12.0; 20:35.1; 20:38.6	–
2nd place, silver medalist(s)	5	West Germany; Ernst Reiter; Stefan Höck; Peter Angerer; Fritz Fischer	0; 0 0; 0 0; 0 0; 0 0	1:23:37.4; 21:05.7; 21:18.0; 20:33.9; 20:39.8	+1:07.4
3rd place, bronze medalist(s)	9	Italy; Werner Kiem; Gottlieb Taschler; Johann Passler; Andreas Zingerle	0; 0 0; 0 0; 0 0; 0 0	1:23:51.5; 20:57.9; 21:31.1; 20:38.6; 20:43.9	+1:21.5
4	1	Austria; Anton Lengauer-Stockner; Bruno Hofstätter; Franz Schuler; Alfred Eder	0; 0 0; 0 0; 0 0; 0 0	1:24:17.6; 20:55.6; 21:20.5; 21:15.1; 20:46.4	+1:47.6
5	11	East Germany; Jürgen Wirth; Frank-Peter Roetsch; Matthias Jacob; André Sehmisch	3; 3 0; 0 0; 0 0; 0 0	1:24:28.4; 22:51.8; 20:20.9; 20:29.1; 20:46.6	+1:58.4
6	4	Norway; Geir Einang; Frode Løberg; Gisle Fenne; Eirik Kvalfoss	0; 0 0; 0 0; 0 0; 0 0	1:25:57.0; 21:58.6; 21:46.4; 20:59.9; 21:12.1	+3:27.0
7	10	Sweden; Peter Sjödén; Mikael Löfgren; Roger Westling; Leif Andersson	3; 0 0; 0 0; 3 0; 0 0	1:29:11.9; 22:18.3; 21:25.0; 23:40.2; 21:48.4	+6:41.9
8	16	Bulgaria; Vasil Bozhilov; Vladimir Velichkov; Krasimir Videnov; Khristo Vodenicharov	7; 1 0; 0 0; 4 0; 0 2	1:29:24.9; 22:14.7; 20:58.8; 23:28.2; 22:43.2	+6:54.9
9	8	United States; Lyle Nelson; Curt Schreiner; Darin Binning; Josh Thompson	2; 1 0; 0 0; 0 0; 1 0	1:29:33.0; 22:43.3; 21:39.7; 22:17.3; 22:52.7	+7:03.0
10	12	France; Éric Claudon; Jean-Paul Giachino; Hervé Flandin; Francis Mougel	6; 0 0; 4 0; 0 0; 0 2	1:30:22.8; 21:58.1; 23:58.2; 21:26.8; 22:59.7	+7:52.8
11	6	Czechoslovakia; Jiří Holubec; František Chládek; Tomáš Kos; Jan Matouš	3; 0 0; 3 0; 0 0; 0 0	1:30:48.8; 21:53.2; 23:52.7; 23:32.2; 21:30.7	+8:18.8
12	2	Finland; Juha Tella; Antero Lähde; Arto Jääskeläinen; Tapio Piipponen	5; 3 0; 0 2; 0 0; 0 0	1:30:54.4; 23:33.0; 22:54.1; 22:46.5; 21:40.8	+8:24.4
13	13	Great Britain; Mike Dixon; Mark Langin; Carl Davies; Trevor King	5; 0 0; 0 0; 0 1; 0 4	1:31:44.6; 21:35.6; 21:55.5; 23:31.5; 24:42.0	+9:14.6
14	15	Japan; Tadashi Nakamura; Misao Kodate; Akihiro Takizawa; Koichi Sato	6; 2 1; 1 0; 2 0; 0 0	1:32:52.4; 23:26.6; 21:46.9; 25:15.1; 22:23.8	+10:22.4
15	7	Canada; Charles Plamondon; Glenn Rupertus; Ken Karpoff; Jamie Kallio	4; 1 2; 1 0; 0 0; 0 0	1:33:37.0; 24:48.4; 22:52.4; 22:29.6; 23:26.6	+11:07.0
16	14	South Korea; Hong Byung-Sik; Joo Young-Dai; Kim Yong-Woon; Shin Young-Sun	7; 0 1; 2 1; 0 2; 1 0	1:51:42.7; 26:42.0; 26:38.9; 29:43.4; 28:38.4	+29:12.7
