= Biathlon at the 1988 Winter Olympics – Sprint =

Men's biathlon sprint at the XV Olympic Winter Games
- Venue: Canmore Nordic Centre
- Dates: 23 February 1988
- Competitors: 72 from 22 nations
- Winning time: 25:08.1

Medalists
1st place, gold medalist(s)		Frank-Peter Roetsch	East Germany
2nd place, silver medalist(s)		Valeriy Medvedtsev	Soviet Union
3rd place, bronze medalist(s)		Sergei Tchepikov	Soviet Union

The Men's 10 kilometre sprint biathlon competition at the 1988 Winter Olympics was held on 23 February, at Canmore Nordic Centre. Competitors raced over three loops of the skiing course, shooting two times, once prone and once standing. Each miss was penalized by requiring the competitor to race over a 150-metre penalty loop.

== Results ==
Frank-Peter Roetsch had led an East German sweep of the sprint podium at the 1987 Biathlon World Championships, and despite a penalty loop, won by more than 15 seconds over two clean shooting Soviet racers, 1986 sprint world champion Valeriy Medvedtsev and 21-year-old Sergei Tchepikov. Roetsch had also won the 20 kilometre event earlier in the week, ending up with both individual gold medals in Calgary.

Rank	Bib	Name	Country	Time	Penalties	Deficit
1st place, gold medalist(s)	63	Frank-Peter Roetsch	East Germany	25:08.1	1 (0+1)	–
2nd place, silver medalist(s)	50	Valeriy Medvedtsev	Soviet Union	25:23.7	0 (0+0)	+15.6
3rd place, bronze medalist(s)	31	Sergei Tchepikov	Soviet Union	25:29.4	0 (0+0)	+21.3
4	10	Birk Anders	East Germany	25:51.8	2 (0+2)	+43.7
5	42	André Sehmisch	East Germany	25:52.3	2 (1+1)	+44.2
6	36	Frank Luck	East Germany	25:57.6	1 (0+1)	+49.5
7	37	Tapio Piipponen	Finland	26:02.2	1 (0+1)	+54.1
8	49	Johann Passler	Italy	26:07.7	2 (1+1)	+59.6
9	69	Dmitry Vasilyev	Soviet Union	26:09.7	1 (0+1)	+1:01.6
10	52	Peter Angerer	West Germany	26:13.2	2 (0+2)	+1:05.1
11	28	Geir Einang	Norway	26:13.3	0 (0+0)	+1:05.2
12	67	Fritz Fischer	West Germany	26:25.9	1 (0+1)	+1:17.8
13	57	Pieralberto Carrara	Italy	26:32.7	2 (2+0)	+1:24.6
14	64	Frode Løberg	Norway	26:32.9	1 (1+0)	+1:24.8
15	24	Andreas Zingerle	Italy	26:33.0	2 (1+1)	+1:24.9
16	56	Jan Matouš	Czechoslovakia	26:33.3	1 (0+1)	+1:25.2
17	53	Franz Schuler	Austria	26:45.0	1 (0+1)	+1:36.9
18	11	Juri Kashkarov	Soviet Union	26:49.1	3 (1+2)	+1:41.0
19	34	Ernst Reiter	West Germany	26:50.2	2 (2+0)	+1:42.1
20	45	Eirik Kvalfoss	Norway	26:51.9	4 (2+2)	+1:43.8
21	38	Mike Dixon	Great Britain	26:53.3	0 (0+0)	+1:45.2
22	9	Mikael Löfgren	Sweden	27:01.0	1 (0+1)	+1:52.9
23	68	Bruno Hofstätter	Austria	27:02.8	1 (0+1)	+1:54.7
24	23	Tomáš Kos	Czechoslovakia	27:13.5	1 (0+1)	+2:05.4
25	41	Harri Eloranta	Finland	27:15.2	3 (2+1)	+2:07.1
26	18	Stefan Höck	West Germany	27:26.2	3 (0+3)	+2:18.1
27	33	Josh Thompson	United States	27:27.7	4 (2+2)	+2:19.6
28	62	Jiří Holubec	Czechoslovakia	27:29.8	3 (0+3)	+2:21.7
29	65	Krasimir Videnov	Bulgaria	27:31.1	1 (0+1)	+2:23.0
30	17	Sverre Istad	Norway	27:34.3	5 (1+4)	+2:26.2
30	47	Lyle Nelson	United States	27:34.3	1 (0+1)	+2:26.2
32	32	Francis Mougel	France	27:34.9	3 (1+2)	+2:26.8
33	13	Roberto Marchesi	Italy	27:36.7	2 (0+2)	+2:28.6
34	7	Jaromír Šimůnek	Czechoslovakia	27:38.6	1 (0+1)	+2:30.5
34	32	Glenn Rupertus	Canada	27:38.6	2 (1+1)	+2:30.5
36	16	Khristo Vodenicharov	Bulgaria	27:40.5	1 (1+0)	+2:32.4
37	12	Egon Leitner	Austria	27:42.4	2 (0+2)	+2:34.3
38	30	Vladimir Velichkov	Bulgaria	27:48.8	2 (1+1)	+2:40.7
39	26	Misao Kodate	Japan	27:52.6	2 (1+1)	+2:44.5
40	21	Alfred Eder	Austria	27:57.3	2 (0+2)	+2:49.2
41	6	Juha Tella	Finland	27:58.3	3 (2+1)	+2:50.2
42	60	Antero Lähde	Finland	27:59.9	3 (2+1)	+2:51.8
43	55	Vasil Bozhilov	Bulgaria	28:06.5	2 (1+1)	+2:58.4
44	51	Tadashi Nakamura	Japan	28:11.4	2 (1+1)	+3:03.3
45	48	Carl Davies	Great Britain	28:12.1	2 (1+1)	+3:04.0
46	61	Ken Karpoff	Canada	28:12.9	1 (0+1)	+3:04.8
47	43	Peter Sjödén	Sweden	28:13.3	2 (1+1)	+3:05.2
48	25	Zsolt Kovács	Hungary	28:13.9	0 (0+0)	+3:05.8
49	71	Bill Carow	United States	28:19.6	4 (1+3)	+3:11.5
50	2	Curt Schreiner	United States	28:19.9	3 (2+1)	+3:11.8
51	1	Christian Dumont	France	28:20.3	2 (1+1)	+3:12.2
52	29	Hervé Flandin	France	28:21.4	4 (3+1)	+3:13.3
53	27	Jure Velepec	Yugoslavia	28:21.9	2 (2+0)	+3:13.8
54	22	Roger Westling	Sweden	28:24.8	4 (1+3)	+3:16.7
55	44	Charles Plamondon	Canada	28:30.5	3 (2+1)	+3:22.4
56	54	Xavier Blond	France	28:36.6	3 (2+1)	+3:28.5
57	72	Leif Andersson	Sweden	28:48.9	4 (3+1)	+3:40.8
58	8	Paget Stewart	Canada	29:06.9	4 (1+3)	+3:58.8
59	14	Koichi Sato	Japan	29:43.1	3 (1+2)	+4:35.0
60	5	Mark Langin	Great Britain	29:52.1	5 (3+2)	+4:44.0
61	59	Trevor King	Great Britain	30:00.5	5 (3+2)	+4:52.4
62	35	Andrew Paul	Australia	30:36.6	1 (0+1)	+5:28.5
63	70	Akihiro Takizawa	Japan	31:38.7	5 (3+2)	+6:30.6
64	19	Shin Young-sun	South Korea	33:05.4	4 (2+2)	+7:57.3
65	20	Alejandro Giró	Argentina	33:55.4	3 (3+0)	+8:47.3
66	58	Joo Young-dai	South Korea	34:50.4	8 (3+5)	+9:42.3
67	39	Kim Yong-woon	South Korea	35:18.6	7 (3+4)	+10:10.5
68	40	Luis Argel	Argentina	35:25.1	8 (4+4)	+10:17.0
69	46	Joung Young-suk	South Korea	35:31.3	6 (4+2)	+10:23.2
70	4	Gustavo Giró	Argentina	36:38.8	6 (3+3)	+11:30.7
71	3	Judd Bankert	Guam	45:37.1	8 (4+4)	+20:29.0
72	15	Elliot Archilla	Puerto Rico	47:47.4	6 (3+3)	+22:39.3
