= Canada at the 1988 Winter Olympics =

- Flag of Canada
- IOC code: CAN
- NOC: Canadian Olympic Committee
- Website: www.olympic.ca

in Calgary, Canada 13 February 1988 – 28 February 1988
- Competitors: 112 (82 men and 30 women) in 10 sports
- Flag bearer (opening): Brian Orser
- Flag bearer (closing): Karen Percy
- Medals Ranked 13th: Gold 0 Silver 2 Bronze 3 Total 5

Winter Olympics appearances (overview)
- 1924; 1928; 1932; 1936; 1948; 1952; 1956; 1960; 1964; 1968; 1972; 1976; 1980; 1984; 1988; 1992; 1994; 1998; 2002; 2006; 2010; 2014; 2018; 2022; 2026

Canada was the host nation for the 1988 Winter Olympics in Calgary. It was the first time that Canada had hosted the Winter Olympic Games, and second time overall, after the 1976 Summer Olympics in Montreal.

== Medalists ==
The following Canadian competitors won medals at the games. In the discipline sections below, the medallists' names are bolded. As was the case with the 1976 Summer Olympics, Canada failed to obtain a gold medal on home soil.

| Medal | Name | Sport | Event | Date |
|---|---|---|---|---|
| Silver | Brian Orser | Figure skating | Men's singles | February 20 |
| Silver | Elizabeth Manley | Figure skating | Women's singles | February 27 |
| Bronze | Karen Percy | Alpine skiing | Women's downhill | February 19 |
| Bronze | Karen Percy | Alpine skiing | Women's super-G | February 22 |
| Bronze | Tracy Wilson; Robert McCall | Figure skating | Ice dance | February 23 |

== Competitors ==
The following is the list of number of competitors participating at the Games per sport/discipline.

| Sport | Men | Women | Total |
|---|---|---|---|
| Alpine skiing | 10 | 8 | 18 |
| Biathlon | 5 | 0 | 5 |
| Bobsleigh | 9 | 0 | 9 |
| Cross-country skiing | 6 | 5 | 11 |
| Figure skating | 9 | 8 | 17 |
| Ice hockey | 22 | 0 | 22 |
| Luge | 7 | 2 | 9 |
| Nordic combined | 1 | 0 | 1 |
| Ski jumping | 4 | 0 | 4 |
| Speed skating | 9 | 7 | 16 |
| Total | 82 | 30 | 112 |

== Alpine skiing ==
A total of 14 competitors, including the entire Canadian team was disqualified from the giant slalom event after organizers became aware their ski suits were not previously approved by the International Ski Federation.

Men

| Athlete | Event | Run 1 | | Run 2 | | Total | |
| Athlete | Event | Time | Rank | Time | Rank | Time | Rank |
|---|---|---|---|---|---|---|---|
| Felix Belczyk | Downhill | —N/a | | | | 2:03.59 | 18 |
| Felix Belczyk | Super-G | —N/a | | | | 1:44.31 | 19 |
| Peter Bosinger | Giant slalom | DSQ | | | | | |
| Rob Boyd | Downhill | —N/a | | | | 2:03.27 | 16 |
| Rob Boyd | Super-G | —N/a | | | | 1:45.04 | 22 |
| Mike Carney | Downhill | —N/a | | | | 2:03.25 | 14 |
| Greg Grossmann | Giant slalom | DSQ | | | | | |
| Greg Grossmann | Slalom | DNF | | | | | |
| Jim Read | Giant slalom | DSQ | | | | | |
| Jim Read | Slalom | DNF | | | | | |
| Jim Read | Super-G | —N/a | | | | 1:43.01 | 13 |
| Brian Stemmle | Downhill | DSQ | | | | | |
| Michael Tommy | Slalom | DNF | | | | | |
| Alain Villiard | Giant slalom | DSQ | | | | | |
| Alain Villiard | Slalom | 54.33 | 22 | 49.44 | 14 | 1:43.77 | 14 |
| Alain Villiard | Super-G | —N/a | | | | DNF | |

Combined

| Athlete | Event | Downhill | | Slalom | | | | Total | |
| Athlete | Event | Time | Points | Run 1 | Run 2 | Total | Points | Points | Rank |
|---|---|---|---|---|---|---|---|---|---|
| Felix Belczyk | Men's combined | 1:48.24 | 14.79 | DSQ | | | | DNF | |
| Rob Boyd | Men's combined | DNF | | | | | | | |
| Mike Carney | Men's combined | DNF | | | | | | | |
| Don Stevens | Men's combined | 1:50.97 | 44.92 | 48.82 | 47.63 | 1:36.45 | 90.88 | 135.80 | 19 |

Women

| Athlete | Event | Run 1 | | Run 2 | | Total | |
| Athlete | Event | Time | Rank | Time | Rank | Time | Rank |
|---|---|---|---|---|---|---|---|
| Kellie Casey | Downhill | —N/a | | | | DNF | |
| Laurie Graham | Downhill | —N/a | | | | 1:26.99 | 5 |
| Laurie Graham | Super-G | —N/a | | | | 1:21.11 | 13 |
| Josée Lacasse | Giant slalom | 1:01.12 | 13 | 1:08.66 | 11 | 2:09.78 | 11 |
| Josée Lacasse | Slalom | 51.63 | 20 | 51.51 | 16 | 1:43.14 | 16 |
| Lucie Laroche | Super-G | —N/a | | | | 1:21.95 | 19 |
| Kerrin Lee-Gartner | Downhill | —N/a | | | | 1:28.07 | 15 |
| Kerrin Lee-Gartner | Giant slalom | 1:02.71 | 24 | 1:10.61 | 17 | 2:13.32 | 17 |
| Kerrin Lee-Gartner | Slalom | DSQ | | | | | |
| Kerrin Lee-Gartner | Super-G | —N/a | | | | 1:22.11 | 23 |
| Michelle McKendry-Ruthven | Giant slalom | DNF | | | | | |
| Michelle McKendry-Ruthven | Slalom | 53.16 | 27 | 52.63 | 18 | 1:45.79 | 18 |
| **Karen Percy** | Downhill | —N/a | | | | 1:26.62 | 3rd place, bronze medalist(s) |
| **Karen Percy** | Giant slalom | DNF | | | | | |
| **Karen Percy** | Slalom | DNF | | | | | |
| **Karen Percy** | Super-G | —N/a | | | | 1:20.29 | 3rd place, bronze medalist(s) |

Women's combined

| Athlete | Event | Downhill | | Slalom | | | | Total | |
| Athlete | Event | Time | Points | Run 1 | Run 2 | Total | Points | Points | Rank |
|---|---|---|---|---|---|---|---|---|---|
| Nancy Gee | Women's combined | 1:20.21 | 57.87 | 42.41 | 43.84 | 1:26.25 | 45.99 | 103.86 | 13 |
| Kerrin Lee-Gartner | Women's combined | 1:18.15 | 26.08 | 42.23 | 43.20 | 1:25.43 | 39.18 | 65.26 | 8 |
| Michelle McKendry-Ruthven | Women's combined | 1:17.58 | 17.28 | 42.24 | 44.20 | 1:26.44 | 47.57 | 64.85 | 7 |
| Karen Percy | Women's combined | 1:18.22 | 27.16 | 40.62 | 43.38 | 1:24.00 | 27.31 | 54.47 | 4 |

== Biathlon ==
| Athlete | Event | Time | Misses | Rank |
|---|---|---|---|---|
| Jamie Kallio | Men's individual | 1:03:13.1 | 7 (0+0+2+5) | 59 |
| Ken Karpoff | Men's individual | 59:19.7 | 3 (0+3+0+0) | 33 |
| Ken Karpoff | Men's sprint | 28:12.9 | 1 (0+1) | 46 |
| Charles Plamondon | Men's individual | 59:27.5 | 5 (1+1+1+2) | 46 |
| Charles Plamondon | Men's sprint | 28:30.5 | 3 (2+1) | 55 |
| Glenn Rupertus | Men's individual | 56:10.4 | 7 (1+3+2+1) | 34 |
| Glenn Rupertus | Men's sprint | 27:38.6 | 2 (1+1) | 34 |
| Paget Stewart | Men's sprint | 29:06.9 | 4 (1+3) | 58 |
| Charles Plamondon; Glenn Rupertus; Ken Karpoff; Jamie Kallio | Men's relay | 1:33:37.0 | 4 (2+2) | 15 |

== Bobsleigh ==
| Sled | Athletes | Event | Run 1 | | Run 2 | | Run 3 | | Run 4 | | Total | |
| Sled | Athletes | Event | Time | Rank | Time | Rank | Time | Rank | Time | Rank | Time | Rank |
|---|---|---|---|---|---|---|---|---|---|---|---|---|
| CAN-1 | Greg Haydenluck; Lloyd Guss | Two-man | 57.36 | 3 | 59.90 | 13 | 1:00.11 | 7 | 59.60 | 12 | 3:56.97 | 10 |
| CAN-2 | David Leuty; Kevin Tyler | Two-man | 58.56 | 18 | 59.08 | 5 | 1:00.55 | 13 | 1:00.00 | 16 | 3:58.19 | 13 |

| Sled | Athletes | Event | Run 1 | | Run 2 | | Run 3 | | Run 4 | | Total | |
| Sled | Athletes | Event | Time | Rank | Time | Rank | Time | Rank | Time | Rank | Time | Rank |
|---|---|---|---|---|---|---|---|---|---|---|---|---|
| CAN-1 | Chris Lori; Ken LeBlanc; Andrew Swim; Howard Dell | Four-man | 56.66 | 3 | 58.05 | 14 | 57.34 | 18 | 58.32 | 17 | 3:50.37 | 15 |
| CAN-2 | Greg Haydenluck; Cal Langford; Kevin Tyler; Lloyd Guss | Four-man | 57.18 | 13 | 57.82 | 11 | 56.67 | 8 | 58.32 | 17 | 3:49.99 | 13 |

== Cross-country skiing ==
Men

| Event | Athlete | Race | |
| Event | Athlete | Time | Rank |
|---|---|---|---|
| 15 km C | Dennis Lawrence | 46:26.3 | 47 |
| 15 km C | Al Pilcher | 46:21.1 | 46 |
| 15 km C | Yves Bilodeau | 46:26.6 | 34 |
| 15 km C | Pierre Harvey | 43:22.0 | 17 |
| 30 km C | Wayne Dustin | 1'34:37.8 | 46 |
| 30 km C | Al Pilcher | 1'33:04.7 | 39 |
| 30 km C | Yves Bilodeau | 1'32:17.8 | 35 |
| 30 km C | Pierre Harvey | 1'28:21.7 | 14 |
| 50 km F | Wayne Dustin | 2'21:31.8 | 49 |
| 50 km F | Alain Masson | 2'19:21.7 | 46 |
| 50 km F | Dennis Lawrence | 2'17:55.7 | 43 |
| 50 km F | Pierre Harvey | 2'10:54.8 | 21 |

C = Classical style, F = Freestyle

Men's 4 × 10 km relay

| Athletes | Race | |
| Athletes | Time | Rank |
|---|---|---|
| Yves Bilodeau; Al Pilcher; Pierre Harvey; Dennis Lawrence | 1'48:59.7 | 9 |

Women

| Event | Athlete | Race | |
| Event | Athlete | Time | Rank |
|---|---|---|---|
| 5 km C | Jean McAllister | 17:32.4 | 46 |
| 5 km C | Carol Gibson | 16:35.2 | 33 |
| 5 km C | Angela Schmidt-Foster | 16:32.5 | 32 |
| 5 km C | Lorna Sasseville | 16:23.3 | 26 |
| 10 km C | Angela Schmidt-Foster | 33:45.9 | 38 |
| 10 km C | Marie-Andrée Masson | 33:35.6 | 37 |
| 10 km C | Carol Gibson | 33:03.9 | 33 |
| 10 km C | Lorna Sasseville | 32:49.7 | 30 |
| 20 km F | Angela Schmidt-Foster | 1'04:21.9 | 44 |
| 20 km F | Jean McAllister | 1'02:02.8 | 31 |
| 20 km F | Marie-Andrée Masson | 1'01:12.6 | 27 |
| 20 km F | Carol Gibson | 1'01:12.0 | 26 |

C = Classical style, F = Freestyle

Women's 4 × 5 km relay

| Athletes | Race | |
| Athletes | Time | Rank |
|---|---|---|
| Angela Schmidt-Foster; Carol Gibson; Lorna Sasseville; Marie-Andrée Masson | 1'04:22.6 | 9 |

== Figure skating ==
Men

| Athlete | CF | SP | FS | TFP | Rank |
|---|---|---|---|---|---|
| Neil Paterson | 17 | 13 | 16 | 31.4 | 16 |
| Kurt Browning | 11 | 7 | 6 | 15.4 | 8 |
| Brian Orser | 3 | 1 | 2 | 4.2 | 2nd place, silver medalist(s) |

Women

| Athlete | CF | SP | FS | TFP | Rank |
|---|---|---|---|---|---|
| Charlene Wong | 18 | 14 | 13 | 29.4 | 13 |
| Elizabeth Manley | 4 | 3 | 1 | 4.6 | 2nd place, silver medalist(s) |

Pairs

| Athletes | SP | FS | TFP | Rank |
|---|---|---|---|---|
| Isabelle Brasseur; Lloyd Eisler | 7 | 9 | 12.5 | 9 |
| Christine Hough; Doug Ladret | 8 | 8 | 12.0 | 8 |
| Denise Benning; Lyndon Johnston | 5 | 7 | 9.5 | 6 |

Ice Dancing

| Athletes | CD | OD | FD | TFP | Rank |
|---|---|---|---|---|---|
| Melanie Cole; Michael Farrington | 16 | 16 | 16 | 32.0 | 16 |
| Karyn Garossino; Rodney Garossino | 12 | 12 | 12 | 24.0 | 12 |
| Tracy Wilson; Robert McCall | 3 | 3 | 3 | 6.0 | 3rd place, bronze medalist(s) |

== Ice hockey ==
Summary

| Team | Event | First round | | | | | | Consolation game | Final round | | | |
| Team | Event | Opposition Score | Opposition Score | Opposition Score | Opposition Score | Opposition Score | Rank | Opposition Score | Opposition Score | Opposition Score | Opposition Score | Rank |
|---|---|---|---|---|---|---|---|---|---|---|---|---|
| Canada men's | Men's tournament | Poland; **W** 1-0 | Switzerland; **W** 4-2 | Finland; **L** 1-3 | France; **W** 9-5 | Sweden; **D** 2-2 | 3 | —N/a | Soviet Union; **L** 0-5 | West Germany; **W** 8-1 | Czechoslovakia; **W** 6-3 | 4 |

=== Group A ===
| | Pld | W | L | T | GF | GA | Pts |
|---|---|---|---|---|---|---|---|
| Finland | 5 | 3 | 1 | 1 | 22 | 8 | 7 |
| Sweden | 5 | 2 | 0 | 3 | 23 | 10 | 7 |
| Canada | 5 | 3 | 1 | 1 | 17 | 12 | 7 |
| Switzerland | 5 | 3 | 2 | 0 | 19 | 10 | 6 |
| Poland | 5 | 1 | 3 | 1 | 9 | 13 | 3 |
| France | 5 | 0 | 5 | 0 | 10 | 47 | 0 |

- Canada 1-0 Poland
- Canada 4-2 Switzerland
- Finland 3-1 Canada
- Canada 9-5 France
- Canada 2-2 Sweden

=== Medal round ===
The top three teams from each group play the top three teams from the other group once. Points from previous games against their own group carry over.

| | Pld | W | L | T | GF | GA | Pts |
|---|---|---|---|---|---|---|---|
| Soviet Union | 5 | 4 | 1 | 0 | 25 | 7 | 8 |
| Finland | 5 | 3 | 1 | 1 | 18 | 10 | 7 |
| Sweden | 5 | 2 | 1 | 2 | 15 | 16 | 6 |
| Canada 4th | 5 | 2 | 2 | 1 | 17 | 14 | 5 |
| West Germany | 5 | 1 | 4 | 0 | 8 | 26 | 2 |
| Czechoslovakia | 5 | 1 | 4 | 0 | 12 | 22 | 2 |

- Soviet Union 5-0 Canada
- Canada 8-1 West Germany
- Canada 6-3 Czechoslovakia

Team Roster

- Sean Burke
- Andy Moog
- Chris Felix
- Randy Gregg
- Serge Roy
- Tony Stiles
- Tim Watters
- Trent Yawney
- Zarley Zalapski
- Ken Berry
- Marc Habscheid
- Vaughn Karpan
- Wally Schreiber
- Gord Sherven
- Claude Vilgrain
- Serge Boisvert
- Brian Bradley
- Bob Joyce
- Steve Tambellini
- Merlin Malinowski
- Jim Peplinski
- Ken Yaremchuk

- Head coach: Dave King

== Luge ==
Men

| Athlete | Run 1 | | Run 2 | | Run 3 | | Run 4 | | Total | |
| Athlete | Time | Rank | Time | Rank | Time | Rank | Time | Rank | Time | Rank |
|---|---|---|---|---|---|---|---|---|---|---|
| Chris Wightman | 47.855 | 29 | 47.856 | 25 | 47.773 | 23 | 48.182 | 26 | 3:11.666 | 24 |
| Nil Labrecque | 47.461 | 23 | 47.866 | 26 | 49.307 | 31 | 48.093 | 24 | 3:12.727 | 27 |
| Harington Telford | 47.152 | 18 | 47.564 | 21 | 47.119 | 16 | 47.463 | 19 | 3:09.298 | 19 |

(Men's) Doubles

| Athletes | Run 1 | | Run 2 | | Total | |
| Athletes | Time | Rank | Time | Rank | Time | Rank |
|---|---|---|---|---|---|---|
| Bob Gasper; André Benoit | 46.240 | 9 | 47.066 | 12 | 1:33.306 | 10 |
| Sam Salmon; Dan Doll | 48.300 | 17 | 49.058 | 18 | 1:37.358 | 17 |

Women

| Athlete | Run 1 | | Run 2 | | Run 3 | | Run 4 | | Total | |
| Athlete | Time | Rank | Time | Rank | Time | Rank | Time | Rank | Time | Rank |
|---|---|---|---|---|---|---|---|---|---|---|
| Kathy Salmon | 47.569 | 18 | 48.112 | 19 | 48.356 | 20 | 47.670 | 19 | 3:11.707 | 19 |
| Marie-Claude Doyon | 46.372 | 5 | 46.596 | 7 | 46.796 | 11 | 46.447 | 6 | 3:06.211 | 7 |

== Nordic combined ==
Men's individual

Events:

- normal hill ski jumping (Best two out of three jumps.)
- 15 km cross-country skiing (Start delay, based on ski jumping results.)

| Athlete | Event | Ski Jumping | | Cross-country | | Total | |
| Athlete | Event | Points | Rank | Start at | Time | Points | Rank |
|---|---|---|---|---|---|---|---|
| Jon Servold | Individual | 187.1 | 33 | 4:36.0 | 46:32.1 | 368.535 | 38 |

== Ski jumping ==
| Athlete | Event | Jump 1 | | Jump 2 | | Total | |
| Athlete | Event | Distance | Points | Distance | Points | Points | Rank |
|---|---|---|---|---|---|---|---|
| Horst Bulau | Normal hill | 74.5 | 80.8 | 78.0 | 86.9 | 167.7 | 44 |
| Todd Gillman | Normal hill | 75.0 | 82.6 | 78.0 | 88.4 | 171.0 | 42 |
| Ron Richards | Normal hill | 78.0 | 88.4 | 78.0 | 86.9 | 175.3 | 32 |
| Steve Collins | Normal hill | 83.5 | 102.7 | 78.0 | 88.4 | 191.1 | 13 |
| Ron Richards | Large hill | 93.0 | 73.6 | 84.0 | 54.5 | 128.1 | 53 |
| Todd Gillman | Large hill | 96.0 | 80.8 | 86.5 | 30.0 | 110.8 | 54 |
| Steve Collins | Large hill | 100.0 | 87.9 | 97.0 | 81.2 | 169.1 | 35 |
| Horst Bulau | Large hill | 112.5 | 109.4 | 99.5 | 88.2 | 197.6 | 7 |

Men's team large hill

| Athletes | Result | |
| Athletes | Points ^{1} | Rank |
|---|---|---|
| Horst Bulau; Steve Collins; Todd Gillman; Ron Richards | 497.2 | 9 |

^{1} Four teams members performed two jumps each. The best three were counted.

== Speed skating ==
Men

| Event | Athlete | Race | |
| Event | Athlete | Time | Rank |
|---|---|---|---|
| 500 m | Robert Tremblay | 38.34 | 29 |
| 500 m | Daniel Turcotte | 37.60 | 17 |
| 500 m | Gaétan Boucher | 37.47 | 14 |
| 500 m | Guy Thibault | 36.96 | 7 |
| 1000 m | Marcel Tremblay | 1:15.13 | 22 |
| 1000 m | Jean Pichette | 1:14.72 | 19 |
| 1000 m | Guy Thibault | 1:14.16 | 7 |
| 1000 m | Gaétan Boucher | 1:13.77 | 5 |
| 1500 m | Gregor Jelonek | 1:56.37 | 23 |
| 1500 m | Ben Lamarche | 1:55.59 | 18 |
| 1500 m | Jean Pichette | 1:54.63 | 10 |
| 1500 m | Gaétan Boucher | 1:54.18 | 9 |
| 5000 m | Gordon Goplen | 7:08.49 | 34 |
| 5000 m | Jean Pichette | 7:04.95 | 31 |
| 5000 m | Ben Lamarche | 6:57.63 | 21 |
| 10,000 m | Gordon Goplen | 14:31.18 | 20 |
| 10,000 m | Ben Lamarche | 14:21.39 | 10 |

Women

| Event | Athlete | Race | |
| Event | Athlete | Time | Rank |
|---|---|---|---|
| 500 m | Ariane Loignon | 41.57 | 23 |
| 500 m | Natalie Grenier | 40.73 | 11 |
| 500 m | Shelley Rhead-Skarvan | 40.36 | 6 |
| 1000 m | Marie-Pierre Lamarche | 1:25.18 | 25 |
| 1000 m | Ariane Loignon | 1:22.75 | 19 |
| 1000 m | Shelley Rhead-Skarvan | 1:21.84 | 14 |
| 1000 m | Natalie Grenier | 1:21.15 | 9 |
| 1500 m | Caroline Maheux | 2:10.83 | 23 |
| 1500 m | Chantal Côté | 2:09.62 | 21 |
| 1500 m | Ariane Loignon | 2:07.63 | 14 |
| 1500 m | Natalie Grenier | 2:06.80 | 11 |
| 3000 m | Chantal Côté | 4:35.74 | 26 |
| 3000 m | Ariane Loignon | 4:28.55 | 15 |
| 5000 m | Kathy Gordon | 7:53.30 | 23 |
| 5000 m | Ariane Loignon | 7:49.55 | 20 |
| 5000 m | Natalie Grenier | 7:46.96 | 18 |
