= Biathlon at the 1988 Winter Olympics – Individual =

Men's biathlon individual at the XV Olympic Winter Games
- Venue: Canmore Nordic Centre
- Dates: 20 February 1988
- Competitors: 71 from 21 nations
- Winning time: 56:33.3

Medalists
1st place, gold medalist(s)		Frank-Peter Roetsch	East Germany
2nd place, silver medalist(s)		Valeriy Medvedtsev	Soviet Union
3rd place, bronze medalist(s)		Johann Passler	Italy

The men's 20 kilometre individual biathlon competition at the 1988 Winter Olympics was held on 20 February, at Canmore Nordic Centre. Each miss resulted in one minute being added to a competitor's skiing time.

== Summary ==
The defending world champion, Frank-Peter Roetsch, had the fastest ski time by more than a full minute, and despite three missed shots, he held off the field to win by 20 seconds. 1986 World champion Valeriy Medvedtsev and Norway's Eirik Kvalfoss finished with the joint second-fastest ski time, but while Medvedtsev's two misses saw him win silver, Kvalfoss missed three and finished 6th. Italy's Johann Passler, the fourth-fastest skier, held off Sergei Tchepikov, who had the best shooting score, to win bronze.

== Results ==
Rank	Bib	Name	Country	Ski Time	Penalties (P+S+P+S)	Result	Deficit
1st place, gold medalist(s)	43	Frank-Peter Roetsch	East Germany	53:33.3	3 (1+1+0+1)	56:33.3	–
2nd place, silver medalist(s)	26	Valeriy Medvedtsev	Soviet Union	54:54.6	2 (0+1+0+1)	56:54.6	+0:21.3
3rd place, bronze medalist(s)	53	Johann Passler	Italy	55:10.1	2 (1+0+0+1)	57:10.1	+0:36.8
4	51	Sergei Tchepikov	Soviet Union	56:17.5	1 (0+1+0+0)	57:17.5	+0:44.2
5	11	Juri Kashkarov	Soviet Union	55:43.1	2 (0+1+1+0)	57:43.1	+1:09.8
6	50	Eirik Kvalfoss	Norway	54:54.6	3 (1+1+1+0)	57:54.6	+1:21.3
7	28	André Sehmisch	East Germany	55:11.4	3 (0+1+2+0)	58:11.4	+1:38.1
8	35	Tapio Piipponen	Finland	55:18.3	3 (1+0+1+1)	58:18.3	+1:45.0
9	59	Matthias Jacob	East Germany	55:20.1	3 (0+2+1+0)	58:20.1	+1:46.8
10	29	Peter Angerer	West Germany	55:46.7	3 (0+2+0+1)	58:46.7	+2:13.4
11	14	Gottlieb Taschler	Italy	55:53.6	3 (1+1+0+1)	58:53.6	+2:20.3
12	58	Alexandr Popov	Soviet Union	56:24.0	3 (0+2+1+0)	59:24.0	+2:50.7
13	47	Mike Dixon	Great Britain	57:32.4	2 (1+0+0+1)	59:32.4	+2:59.1
14	48	Jan Matouš	Czechoslovakia	56:35.3	3 (1+0+0+2)	59:35.3	+3:02.0
15	12	Khristo Vodenicharov	Bulgaria	58:20.8	2 (1+0+1+0)	1:00:20.8	+3:47.5
16	7	Jürgen Wirth	East Germany	57:25.9	3 (1+0+1+1)	1:00:25.9	+3:52.6
17	61	Herbert Fritzenwenger	West Germany	56:27.8	4 (0+2+2+0)	1:00:27.8	+3:54.5
18	63	Jean-Paul Giachino	France	57:43.7	3 (0+1+1+1)	1:00:43.7	+4:10.4
19	45	Vasil Bozhilov	Bulgaria	56:49.8	4 (2+1+0+1)	1:00:49.8	+4:16.5
20	27	Frode Løberg	Norway	56:52.7	4 (1+0+3+0)	1:00:52.7	+4:19.4
21	32	Vladimir Velichkov	Bulgaria	56:56.5	4 (1+1+0+2)	1:00:56.5	+4:23.2
22	8	Tomáš Kos	Czechoslovakia	58:02.7	3 (0+1+0+2)	1:01:02.7	+4:29.4
23	42	Fritz Fischer	West Germany	56:04.5	5 (1+1+0+3)	1:01:04.5	+4:31.2
24	71	Bruno Hofstätter	Austria	57:05.1	4 (1+1+0+2)	1:01:05.1	+4:31.8
25	57	Josh Thompson	United States	56:29.4	5 (1+1+0+3)	1:01:29.4	+4:56.1
26	33	Alfred Eder	Austria	55:39.7	6 (3+1+2+0)	1:01:39.7	+5:06.4
27	18	Egon Leitner	Austria	58:52.3	3 (1+1+1+0)	1:01:52.3	+5:19.0
28	1	Carl Davies	Great Britain	58:54.1	3 (0+2+0+1)	1:01:54.1	+5:20.8
29	9	Ernst Reiter	West Germany	56:54.8	5 (2+0+2+1)	1:01:54.8	+5:21.5
30	17	Gisle Fenne	Norway	56:56.5	5 (1+1+3+0)	1:01:56.5	+5:23.2
31	30	Peter Sjödén	Sweden	59:07.8	3 (0+1+0+2)	1:02.07.8	+5:34.5
32	37	Jiří Holubec	Czechoslovakia	57:08.3	5 (0+2+1+2)	1:02.08.3	+5:35.0
33	55	Ken Karpoff	Canada	59:19.7	3 (0+3+0+0)	1:02:19.7	+5:46.4
34	19	Glenn Rupertus	Canada	56:10.4	7 (1+3+2+1)	1:03:10.4	+6:37.1
35	24	Jure Velepec	Yugoslavia	59:15.6	4 (1+1+1+1)	1:03:15.6	+6:42.3
36	39	Franz Schuler	Austria	55:24.5	8 (1+4+1+2)	1:03:24.5	+6:51.2
37	68	Leif Andersson	Sweden	58:27.3	5 (1+1+1+2)	1:03:27.3	+6:54.0
38	60	Juha Tella	Finland	57:39.0	6 (2+1+3+0)	1:03:39.0	+7:05.7
39	65	Sylfest Glimsdal	Norway	55:46.9	8 (2+4+0+2)	1:03:46.9	+7:13.6
40	52	Misao Kodate	Japan	57:51.0	6 (1+3+1+1)	1:03:51.0	+7:17.7
41	2	Thierry Gerbier	France	57:51.7	6 (2+2+1+1)	1:03:51.7	+7:18.4
42	15	Darin Binning	United States	59:54.8	4 (1+1+2+0)	1:03:54.8	+7:21.5
43	66	Werner Kiem	Italy	57:00.3	7 (2+3+1+1)	1:04:00.3	+7:27.0
44	62	František Chládek	Czechoslovakia	1:00:01.3	4 (1+1+1+1)	1:04:01.3	+7:28.0
45	21	Éric Claudon	France	58:16.8	6 (1+3+0+2)	1:04:16.8	+7:43.5
46	10	Charles Plamondon	Canada	59:27.5	5 (1+1+1+2)	1:04:27.5	+7:54.2
47	22	Trevor King	Great Britain	58:37.9	6 (2+1+1+2)	1:04:37.9	+8:04.6
48	4	Tadashi Nakamura	Japan	57:01.3	8 (2+4+0+2)	1:05:01.3	+8:28.0
49	40	Bill Carow	United States	1:00:10.1	5 (0+3+0+2)	1:05:10.1	+8:36.8
50	54	Harri Eloranta	Finland	58:10.6	7 (2+2+1+2)	1:05:10.6	+8:37.3
51	49	Mikael Löfgren	Sweden	58:12.0	7 (2+2+2+1)	1:05:12.0	+8:38.7
52	31	Curt Schreiner	United States	1:00:22.7	5 (1+1+1+2)	1:05:22.7	+8:49.4
53	56	Mark Langin	Great Britain	1:01:50.3	4 (0+1+1+2)	1:05:50.3	+9:17.0
54	23	Zsolt Kovács	Hungary	1:02:15.2	4 (1+2+0+1)	1:06:15.2	+9:41.9
55	64	Khristo Kovachki	Bulgaria	59:15.6	7 (1+2+2+2)	1:06:15.6	+9:42.3
56	41	Hervé Flandin	France	59:50.9	7 (2+3+1+1)	1:06:50.9	+10:17.6
57	20	Andrew Paul	Australia	1:02:59.3	6 (3+2+1+0)	1:08:59.3	+12:26.0
58	13	Arto Jääskeläinen	Finland	58:29.5	11 (4+1+2+4)	1:09:29.5	+12:56.2
59	67	Jamie Kallio	Canada	1:03:13.1	7 (0+0+2+5)	1:10:13.1	+13:39.8
60	36	Koichi Sato	Japan	1:02:18.7	8 (3+2+1+2)	1:10:18.7	+13:45.4
61	69	Akihiro Takizawa	Japan	1:03:38.0	7 (3+2+1+1)	1:10:38.0	+14:04.7
62	34	Hong Byung-sik	South Korea	1:06:03.2	8 (4+0+2+2)	1:14:03.2	+17:29.9
63	3	Joo Young-dai	South Korea	1:06:27.5	8 (3+3+1+1)	1:14:27.5	+17:54.2
64	5	Alejandro Giró	Argentina	1:11:34.4	5 (1+2+1+1)	1:16:34.4	+20:01.1
65	70	Kim Yong-woon	South Korea	1:08:23.0	9 (4+2+1+2)	1:17:23.0	+20:49.7
66	44	Shin Young-sun	South Korea	1:08:44.5	9 (2+3+3+1)	1:17:44.5	+21:11.2
67	46	Luis Argel	Argentina	1:12:47.6	11 (3+3+4+1)	1:23:47.6	+27:14.3
68	16	Elliot Archilla	Puerto Rico	1:38:57.6	13 (2+3+4+4)	1:51:57.6	+55:24.3
-	6	Roger Westling	Sweden	DNF	-	-	-
-	38	Andreas Zingerle	Italy	DQ	-	-	-
-	25	Gustavo Giró	Argentina	DQ	-	-	-
