= Alpine skiing at the 1988 Winter Olympics – Men's downhill =

Men's downhill at the XV Olympic Winter Games
- Alpine skiing
- Venue: Nakiska, Kananaskis Village, Alberta, Canada
- Date: February 15, 1988
- Competitors: 51 from 18 nations
- Winning time: 1:59.63

Medalists
1st place, gold medalist(s)		Pirmin Zurbriggen	Switzerland
2nd place, silver medalist(s)		Peter Müller	Switzerland
3rd place, bronze medalist(s)		Franck Piccard	France

Men's Downhill
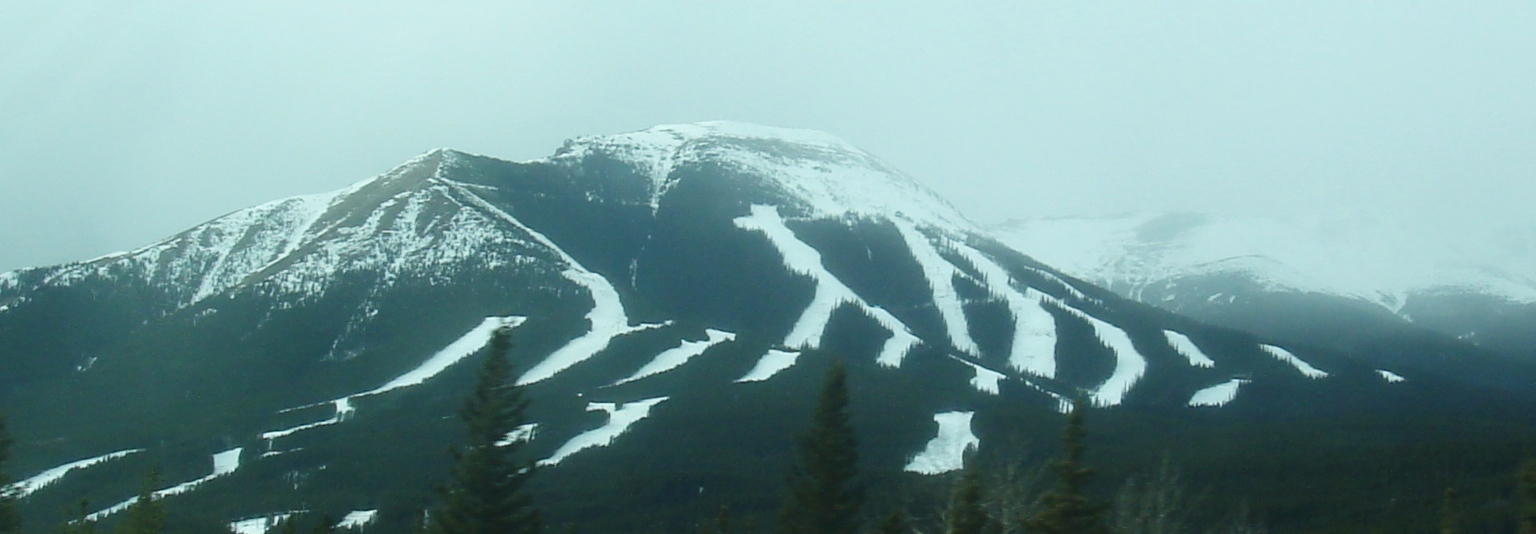
- Location: Nakiska
- Vertical: 874 m (2,867 ft)
- Top elevation: 2,412 m (7,913 ft)
- Base elevation: 1,538 m (5,046 ft)

The Men's downhill competition of the Calgary 1988 Olympics was held at the newly-developed Nakiska on Mount Allan on Monday, February 15.

The reigning world champion was Peter Müller, while all-around Pirmin Zurbriggen was the defending World Cup downhill champion, led the current season, and was a medal threat in all five alpine events. Defending Olympic champion Bill Johnson did not make the U.S. Olympic team; this was the third of four consecutive Olympics without the defending champion in the field.

The race was postponed a day due to winds that gusted to 98 mph (158 km/h) at the exposed summit; Zurbriggen took the gold and Müller the silver, a half-second behind. More than a second behind the runner-up was bronze medalist Franck Piccard. Leonhard Stock, the 1980 champion, was fourth, but nearly two seconds behind Zurbriggen.

The course started at an elevation of 2,412 m (7,913 ft) above sea level with a vertical drop of 874 m (2,867 ft) and a course length of 3.147 km (1.96 mi). Zurbriggen's winning time of 119.63 seconds yielded an average speed of 94.702 km/h (58.8 mph), with an average vertical descent rate of 7.306 m/s (24.0 ft/s).

== Results ==
The race was started at 11:30 local time, (UTC −7). At the starting gate, the skies were overcast, the temperature was −7 °C (19 °F), and the snow condition was hard; the temperature at the finish was 0 °C (32 °F).

Rank	Bib	Name	Country	Time	Difference
1st place, gold medalist(s)	14	Pirmin Zurbriggen	Switzerland	1:59.63	—
2nd place, silver medalist(s)	1	Peter Müller	Switzerland	2:00.14	+0.51
3rd place, bronze medalist(s)	15	Franck Piccard	France	2:01.24	+1.61
4	12	Leonhard Stock	Austria	2:01.56	+1.93
5	21	Gerhard Pfaffenbichler	Austria	2:02.02	+2.39
6	9	Markus Wasmeier	West Germany	2:02.03	+2.40
7	10	Anton Steiner	Austria	2:02.19	+2.56
8	26	Martin Bell	Great Britain	2:02.49	+2.86
9	8	Marc Girardelli	Luxembourg	2:02.59	+2.96
10	13	Danilo Sbardellotto	Italy	2:02.69	+3.06
11	28	Shinya Chiba	Japan	2:03.16	+3.53
12	3	Daniel Mahrer	Switzerland	2:03.18	+3.55
13	25	Hannes Zehentner	West Germany	2:03.23	+3.60
14	35	Mike Carney	Canada	2:03.25	+3.62
15	16	Atle Skårdal	Norway	2:03.26	+3.63
16	7	Rob Boyd	Canada	2:03.27	+3.64
17	6	Franz Heinzer	Switzerland	2:03.36	+3.73
18	11	Felix Belczyk	Canada	2:03.59	+3.96
19	37	Günther Mader	Austria	2:03.96	+4.33
20	24	Hansjörg Tauscher	West Germany	2:04.31	+4.68
21	20	Peter Dürr	West Germany	2:04.32	+4.69
22	30	Steven Lee	Australia	2:04.46	+4.83
23	33	Graham Bell	Great Britain	2:04.56	+4.93
24	19	Jan Einar Thorsen	Norway	2:04.77	+5.14
25	2	Christophe Plé	France	2:04.78	+5.15
26	32	A J Kitt	United States	2:04.94	+5.31
27	18	Lars-Börje Eriksson	Sweden	2:05.02	+5.39
28	27	Jeff Olson	United States	2:05.09	+5.46
29	43	Peter Jurko	Czechoslovakia	2:05.32	+5.69
30	34	Niklas Henning	Sweden	2:05.52	+5.89
31	17	Igor Cigolla	Italy	2:05.85	+6.22
32	29	Doug Lewis	United States	2:06.25	+6.62
33	39	Adrian Bireš	Czechoslovakia	2:06.34	+6.71
34	36	Katsuhito Kumagai	Japan	2:07.17	+7.54
35	45	Finn Christian Jagge	Norway	2:07.64	+8.01
36	51	Silvio Wille	Liechtenstein	2:07.77	+8.14
37	37	Boris Duncan	Great Britain	2:07.88	+8.25
38	46	Gregor Hoop	Liechtenstein	2:08.50	+8.87
39	47	Robert Büchel	Liechtenstein	2:08.66	+9.03
40	44	Niklas Lindqvist	Sweden	2:09.41	+9.78
41	40	Nils Linneberg	Chile	2:09.83	+10.20
42	41	Dieter Linneberg	Chile	2:11.16	+11.53
43	49	Hubertus von Hohenlohe	Mexico	2:12.58	+12.95
44	48	Jorge Birkner	Argentina	2:14.20	+14.57
45	50	Javier Rivara	Argentina	2:16.79	+17.16
-	42	Peter Forras	Australia	DNF	-
-	31	Bill Hudson	United States	DNF	-
-	4	Luc Alphand	France	DNF	-
-	23	Michael Mair	Italy	DNF	-
-	22	Philippe Verneret	France	DQ	-
-	5	Brian Stemmle	Canada	DQ	-
