= Alpine skiing at the 1988 Winter Olympics – Men's combined =

Men's combined at the XV Olympic Winter Games
- Alpine skiing
- Venue: Nakiska
- Date: February 17, 1988
- Competitors: 56 from 20 nations
- Winning points: 36.55

Medalists
1st place, gold medalist(s)		Hubert Strolz	Austria
2nd place, silver medalist(s)		Bernhard Gstrein	Austria
3rd place, bronze medalist(s)		Paul Accola	Switzerland

The Men's combined competition of the Calgary 1988 Olympics was held at Nakiska.

The defending world champion was Marc Girardelli of Luxembourg, while Switzerland's Pirmin Zurbriggen was the defending World Cup combined champion, and Austria's Hubert Strolz led the 1988 World Cup.

== Results ==
Rank	Name	Country	Downhill		Slalom				Total
Rank	Name	Country	Time	Points	Run 1	Run 2	Total	Points	Total
1st place, gold medalist(s)	Hubert Strolz	Austria	1:48.51	17.77	44.56	42.75	1:27.31	18.78	36.55
2nd place, silver medalist(s)	Bernhard Gstrein	Austria	1:50.20	36.43	43.17	42.65	1:25.82	7.02	43.45
3rd place, bronze medalist(s)	Paul Accola	Switzerland	1:51.27	48.24	42.58	42.35	1:24.93	0.00	48.24
4	Luc Alphand	France	1:49.60	29.80	45.27	43.20	1:28.47	27.93	57.73
5	Peter Jurko	Czechoslovakia	1:50.29	37.42	44.32	43.29	1:27.61	21.14	58.56
6	Jean-Luc Crétier	France	1:50.04	34.66	44.62	43.90	1:28.52	28.32	62.98
7	Markus Wasmeier	West Germany	1:49.32	26.71	45.32	44.52	1:29.84	38.73	65.44
8	Adrian Bireš	Czechoslovakia	1:50.24	36.86	45.94	43.00	1:28.94	31.63	68.49
9	Finn Christian Jagge	Norway	1:54.66	85.65	43.35	42.79	1:26.14	9.55	95.20
10	Niklas Henning	Sweden	1:51.16	47.02	46.11	45.06	1:31.17	49.23	96.25
11	Armin Bittner	West Germany	1:55.42	94.04	42.82	42.82	1:25.64	5.60	99.64
12	Christophe Plé	France	1:49.06	23.84	47.68	47.30	1:34.98	79.28	103.12
13	Thomas Stangassinger	Austria	1:54.70	86.09	44.76	42.93	1:27.69	21.77	107.86
14	Gregor Hoop	Liechtenstein	1:53.21	69.65	45.95	44.68	1:30.63	44.97	114.62
15	Bernhard Fahner	Switzerland	1:51.78	53.86	47.56	45.81	1:33.37	66.58	120.44
16	Paul Frommelt	Liechtenstein	1:56.82	109.49	43.33	43.20	1:26.53	12.62	122.11
17	Peter Dürr	West Germany	1:48.30	15.45	49.84	48.84	1:38.68	108.47	123.92
18	Oswald Tötsch	Italy	1:57.83	120.64	44.32	42.32	1:26.64	13.49	134.13
19	Don Stevens	Canada	1:50.97	44.92	48.82	47.63	1:36.45	90.88	135.80
20	Robert Büchel	Liechtenstein	1:53.96	77.92	46.96	45.42	1:32.38	58.77	136.69
21	Katsuhito Kumagai	Japan	1:52.10	57.39	48.85	47.14	1:35.99	87.25	144.64
22	Hannes Zehentner	West Germany	1:49.16	24.94	59.52	47.33	1:46.85	172.92	197.86
23	Juan Pablo Santiagos	Chile	1:58.52	128.25	49.18	47.91	1:37.09	95.93	224.18
24	Jorge Birkner	Argentina	1:59.37	137.64	49.74	48.67	1:38.41	106.34	243.98
25	Giannis Stamatiou	Greece	2:07.51	227.48	50.45	49.68	1:40.13	119.91	347.39
26	Martin Bell	Great Britain	1:49.54	29.14	84.34	50.49	2:14.83	393.65	422.79
-	Pirmin Zurbriggen	Switzerland	1:46.90	0.00	44.32	DNF	-	-	-
-	Franck Piccard	France	1:47.38	5.30	DNF	-	-	-	-
-	Felix Belczyk	Canada	1:48.24	14.79	DQ	-	-	-	-
-	Lars-Börje Eriksson	Sweden	1:49.52	28.92	DNF	-	-	-	-
-	Günther Mader	Austria	1:49.56	29.36	DNF	-	-	-	-
-	Danilo Sbardellotto	Italy	1:49.57	29.47	DNF	-	-	-	-
-	Graham Bell	Great Britain	1:50.25	36.98	DQ	-	-	-	-
-	Atle Skårdal	Norway	1:50.27	37.20	DNF	-	-	-	-
-	A J Kitt	United States	1:50.42	38.85	56.95	DNF	-	-	-
-	Igor Cigolla	Italy	1:50.86	43.71	DNF	-	-	-	-
-	Martin Hangl	Switzerland	1:51.48	50.55	DNF	-	-	-	-
-	Jan Einar Thorsen	Norway	1:51.89	55.08	DNF	-	-	-	-
-	Felix McGrath	United States	1:53.35	71.19	DNF	-	-	-	-
-	Boris Duncan	Great Britain	1:53.40	71.74	DNS	-	-	-	-
-	Sergey Petrik	Soviet Union	1:55.82	98.45	DQ	-	-	-	-
-	Dieter Linneberg	Chile	1:55.97	100.11	DNF	-	-	-	-
-	Konstantin Chistyakov	Soviet Union	1:55.99	100.33	DNF	-	-	-	-
-	Niklas Lindqvist	Sweden	1:56.63	107.39	46.02	DNF	-	-	-
-	Hubertus von Fürstenberg-von Hohenlohe	Mexico	1:57.42	116.11	DQ	-	-	-	-
-	Paulo Oppliger	Chile	1:57.65	118.65	51.54	DQ	-	-	-
-	Javier Rivara	Argentina	1:58.28	125.61	DNF	-	-	-	-
-	Silvio Wille	Liechtenstein	2:21.71	384.21	DQ	-	-	-	-
	Simon Wi Rutene	New Zealand	DNF	-	-	-	-	-	-
	Nils Linneberg	Chile	DNF	-	-	-	-	-	-
	Mike Carney	Canada	DNF	-	-	-	-	-	-
	Bill Hudson	United States	DNF	-	-	-	-	-	-
	Jeff Olson	United States	DNF	-	-	-	-	-	-
	Rob Boyd	Canada	DNF	-	-	-	-	-	-
	Peter Forras	Australia	DQ	-	-	-	-	-	-
	Steven Lee	Australia	DQ	-	-	-	-	-	-
