= Speed skating at the 1988 Winter Olympics – Men's 5000 metres =

Speed skating at the Olympics

Men's 5000 metres at the XV Olympic Winter Games
- Pictogram for speed skating
- Venue: Olympic Oval
- Dates: 17 February 1988
- Competitors: 38 from 18 nations
- Winning time: 6:44.63 OR

Medalists
1st place, gold medalist(s)		Tomas Gustafson; Sweden
2nd place, silver medalist(s)		Leo Visser; Netherlands
3rd place, bronze medalist(s)		Gerard Kemkers; Netherlands

The men's 5000 metres in speed skating at the 1988 Winter Olympics took place on 17 February, at the Olympic Oval. 38 competitors from 18 nations participated in the event.

== Records ==
Prior to this competition, the existing world and Olympic records were as follows:

World record	Geir Karlstad (NOR)	6:43.59	Calgary, Canada	4 December 1987
Olympic record	Eric Heiden (USA)	7:02.29	Lake Placid, United States	16 February 1980

The following new World and Olympic records were set during the competition:

Date	Pair	Athlete	Country	Time	OR	WR
17 February	Pair 1	Dmitriy Bochkaryov	Soviet Union	6:56.57	OR	
17 February	Pair 2	Leo Visser	Netherlands	6:44.98	OR	
17 February	Pair 9	Tomas Gustafson	Sweden	6:44.63	OR	

== Results ==
Rank	Pair	Lane	Athlete	Country	Time	Time behind	Notes
1st place, gold medalist(s)	9	I	Tomas Gustafson	Sweden	6:44.63	—	OR
2nd place, silver medalist(s)	2	O	Leo Visser	Netherlands	6:44.98	+0.35	
3rd place, bronze medalist(s)	4	O	Gerard Kemkers	Netherlands	6:45.92	+1.29	
4	8	I	Eric Flaim	United States	6:47.09	+2.46	
5	3	O	Michael Hadschieff	Austria	6:48.72	+4.09	
6	11	I	Dave Silk	United States	6:49.95	+5.32	
7	3	I	Geir Karlstad	Norway	6:50.88	+6.25	
8	10	I	Roland Freier	East Germany	6:51.42	+6.79	
9	7	I	Mark Greenwald	United States	6:51.98	+7.35	
10	12	O	Danny Kah	Australia	6:52.14	+7.51	
11	16	O	Roberto Sighel	Italy	6:53.04	+8.41	
12	6	O	Rolf Falk-Larssen	Norway	6:54.37	+9.74	
13	5	O	Herbert Dijkstra	Netherlands	6:54.63	+10.00	
14	7	O	Toru Aoyanagi	Japan	6:54.70	+10.07	
15	16	I	Bruno Milesi	Italy	6:54.93	+10.30	
16	10	O	Pertti Niittylä	Finland	6:55.18	+10.55	
17	1	O	Dmitry Bochkaryov	Soviet Union	6:56.57	+11.94	
18	15	I	Timo Järvinen	Finland	6:56.68	+12.05	
19	19	I	Per Bengtsson	Sweden	6:57.05	+12.42	
20	4	I	Christian Eminger	Austria	6:57.22	+12.59	
21	2	I	Ben Lamarche	Canada	6:57.63	+13.00	
22	17	I	Hans van Helden	France	6:57.69	+13.06	
23	6	I	Sergey Berezin	Soviet Union	6:58.08	+13.45	
24	5	I	Hansjörg Baltes	West Germany	6:59.45	+14.82	
25	14	I	Jiří Kyncl	Czechoslovakia	6:59.82	+15.19	
26	1	I	Yury Klyuyev	Soviet Union	7:00.01	+15.38	
27	9	O	Munehisa Kuroiwa	Japan	7:01.55	+16.92	
28	18	O	Song Yong-hun	North Korea	7:01.56	+16.93	
29	17	O	Kim Gwan-gyu	South Korea	7:02.13	+17.50	
30	15	O	Joakim Karlberg	Sweden	7:02.30	+17.67	
31	12	I	Jean Pichette	Canada	7:04.95	+20.32	
32	13	I	Yoshiyuki Shimizu	Japan	7:05.35	+20.72	
33	8	O	Frode Syvertsen	Norway	7:05.57	+20.94	
34	14	O	Gordon Goplen	Canada	7:08.49	+23.86	
35	19	O	Im Ri-bin	North Korea	7:10.13	+25.50	
36	13	O	Hwang Ik-hwan	South Korea	7:10.65	+26.02	
37	11	I	Julian Green	Great Britain	7:13.20	+28.57	
38	18	I	Craig McNicoll	Great Britain	7:34.14	+49.51	
