= Bulgaria at the 1988 Winter Olympics =

- Flag of Bulgaria
- IOC code: BUL
- NOC: Bulgarian Olympic Committee
- Website: www.bgolympic.org (in Bulgarian and English)

in Calgary
- Competitors: 26 in 7 sports
- Flag bearer: Vladimir Velichkov
- Medals: Gold 0 Silver 0 Bronze 0 Total 0

Winter Olympics appearances (overview)
- 1936; 1948; 1952; 1956; 1960; 1964; 1968; 1972; 1976; 1980; 1984; 1988; 1992; 1994; 1998; 2002; 2006; 2010; 2014; 2018; 2022; 2026; 2030

Bulgaria competed at the 1988 Winter Olympics in Calgary, Alberta, Canada.

== Competitors ==
The following is the list of number of competitors in the Games.

Sport	Men	Women	Total
Alpine skiing	4	0	4
Biathlon	5	–	5
Bobsleigh	5	–	5
Cross-country skiing	5	0	5
Figure skating	1	1	2
Luge	2	1	3
Ski jumping	2	–	2
Total	24	2	26

== Alpine skiing ==
Men

Athlete	Event	Race 1	Race 2	Total	
Athlete	Event	Time	Time	Time	Rank
Stefan Shalamanov	Giant Slalom	DNF	–	DNF	–
Borislav Dimitrachkov	Giant Slalom	DNF	–	DNF	–
Lyubomir Popov	Giant Slalom	1:10.73	DNF	DNF	–
Stefan Shalamanov	Slalom	58.68	53.69	1:52.37	23
Lyubomir Popov	Slalom	57.78	53.03	1:50.81	19
Borislav Dimitrachkov	Slalom	57.58	53.23	1:50.81	19
Petar Popangelov	Slalom	55.14	51.20	1:46.34	16

== Biathlon ==
Men

Event	Athlete	Misses ^{1}	Time	Rank
10 km Sprint	Vasil Bozhilov	2	28:06.5	43
10 km Sprint	Vladimir Velichkov	2	27:48.8	38
10 km Sprint	Khristo Vodenicharov	1	27:40.5	36
10 km Sprint	Krasimir Videnov	1	27:31.1	29

Event	Athlete	Time	Misses	Adjusted time ^{2}	Rank
20 km	Khristo Kovachki	59:15.6	7	1'06:15.6	55
20 km	Vladimir Bozhilov	56:56.5	4	1'00:56.5	21
20 km	Vasil Bozhilov	56:49.8	4	1'00:49.8	19
20 km	Khristo Vodenicharov	58:20.8	2	1'00:20.8	15

Men's 4 x 7.5 km relay

Athletes	Race		
Athletes	Misses ^{1}	Time	Rank
Vasil Bozhilov; Vladimir Velichkov; Krasimir Videnov; Khristo Vodenicharov	7	1'29:24.9	8

^{1} A penalty loop of 150 metres had to be skied per missed target.
^{2} One minute added per missed target.

== Bobsleigh ==
Sled	Athletes	Event	Run 1		Run 2		Run 3		Run 4		Total	
Sled	Athletes	Event	Time	Rank	Time	Rank	Time	Rank	Time	Rank	Time	Rank
BUL-1	Tsvetozar Viktorov; Aleksandar Simeonov	Two-man	58.82	22	1:00.74	26	1:01.35	23	1:00.26	20	4:01.17	22
BUL-2	Todor Todorov; Nikolay Botev	Two-man	59.68	32	1:01.44	34	1:02.05	33	1:01.64	33	4:04.81	32

Sled	Athletes	Event	Run 1		Run 2		Run 3		Run 4		Total	
Sled	Athletes	Event	Time	Rank	Time	Rank	Time	Rank	Time	Rank	Time	Rank
BUL-1	Tsvetozar Viktorov; Plamen Stamov; Nikolay Botev; Aleksandar Simeonov	Four-man	57.72	21	59.07	24	58.20	24	58.67	21	3:53.66	24

== Cross-country skiing ==
Men

Event	Athlete	Race	
Event	Athlete	Time	Rank
15 km C	Atanas Simidchiev	49:53.6	67
15 km C	Mano Ketenzhiev	48:54.7	64
15 km C	Todor Makhov	47:47.5	55
15 km C	Svetoslav Atanasov	46:43.0	49
30 km C	Mano Ketenzhiev	1'34:57.0	48
30 km C	Todor Makhov	1'33:25.5	41
30 km C	Ivan Smilenov	1'32:26.9	36
30 km C	Svetoslav Atanasov	1'31:15.7	28
50 km F	Mano Ketenzhiev	DNF	–
50 km F	Todor Makhov	DNF	–
50 km F	Atanas Simidchiev	2'17:02.4	40

C = Classical style, F = Freestyle

Men's 4 × 10 km relay

Athletes	Race	
Athletes	Time	Rank
Svetoslav Atanasov; Ivan Smilenov; Atanas Simidchiev; Todor Makhov	1'49:27.9	12

== Figure skating ==
Men

Athlete	CF	SP	FS	TFP	Rank
Boyko Aleksiev	26	27	DNQ	DNF	–

Women

Athlete	CF	SP	FS	TFP	Rank
Petya Gavazova	30	26	DNQ	DNF	–

== Luge ==
(Men's) Doubles

Athletes	Run 1		Run 2		Total	
Athletes	Time	Rank	Time	Rank	Time	Rank
Krasimir Kamenov; Mitko Bachev	51.957	18	48.620	16	1:40.577	18

Women

Athlete	Run 1		Run 2		Run 3		Run 4		Total	
Athlete	Time	Rank	Time	Rank	Time	Rank	Time	Rank	Time	Rank
Simoneta Racheva	48.790	23	48.836	23	48.698	22	48.533	23	3:14.857	23

== Ski jumping ==
Athlete	Event	Jump 1		Jump 2		Total	
Athlete	Event	Distance	Points	Distance	Points	Points	Rank
Emil Zografski	Normal hill	77.0	83.3	78.0	87.9	171.2	40
Vladimir Breychev	Normal hill	79.0	90.0	71.0	69.7	159.7	53
Vladimir Breychev	Large hill	101.5	86.5	86.5	61.0	147.5	46
Emil Zografski	Large hill	101.5	88.0	94.0	73.0	161.0	40
