= Speed skating at the 1988 Winter Olympics – Women's 5000 metres =

Women's 5000 metres at the XV Olympic Winter Games
- Pictogram for speed skating
- Venue: Olympic Oval
- Dates: February 28, 1988
- Competitors: 25 from 15 nations
- Winning time: 7:14.13 WR

Medalists
1st place, gold medalist(s)		Yvonne van Gennip; Netherlands
2nd place, silver medalist(s)		Andrea Ehrig; East Germany
3rd place, bronze medalist(s)		Gabi Zange; East Germany

The women's 5000 metres in speed skating at the 1988 Winter Olympics took place on 28 February, at the Olympic Oval. 25 competitors from 15 nations participated in the event.

== Records ==
Prior to this competition, the existing world and Olympic records were as follows:

World record	Yvonne van Gennip (NED)	7:20.36	Heerenveen, Netherlands	20 March 1987
Olympic record	None	None	None	None

The following new world and olympic records was set during the competition.

Date	Pair	Athlete	Country	Time	OR	WR
28 February	Pair 1	Andrea Ehrig	East Germany	7:17.12	OR	WR
28 February	Pair 5	Yvonne van Gennip	Netherlands	7:14.13	OR	WR

== Results ==
Rank	Pair	Lane	Athlete	Country	Time	Behind	Notes
1st place, gold medalist(s)	5	O	Yvonne van Gennip	Netherlands	7:14.13	–	(WR)
(silver)	1	O	Andrea Ehrig	East Germany	7:17.12	+2.99	
(bronze)	2	I	Gabi Zange	East Germany	7:21.61	+7.48	
4	6	I	Svetlana Boyko	Soviet Union	7:28.39	+14.26	
5	5	I	Yelena Lapuga	Soviet Union	7:28.65	+14.52	
6	4	O	Seiko Hashimoto	Japan	7:34.43	+20.30	
7	3	I	Gunda Kleemann	East Germany	7:34.59	+20.46	
8	1O	I	Jasmin Krohn	Sweden	7:36.56	+22.43	
9	12	O	Han Chun-ok	North Korea	7:36.81	+22.68	
10	7	O	Jane Goldman	United States	7:36.98	+22.85	
11	2	O	Mary Docter	United States	7:37.00	+22.87	
12	9	I	Elena Belci	Italy	7:37.23	+23.10	
13	3	O	Marieke Stam	Netherlands	7:38.02	+23.87	
14	1	I	Ingrid Paul	Netherlands	7:40.67	+26.54	
15	7	I	Yelena Tumanova	Soviet Union	7:40.82	+26.69	
16	8	I	Wang Xiaoyan	China	7:46.30	+32.17	
17	11	O	Kim Young-ok	South Korea	7:46.51	+32.38	
18	9	O	Natalie Grenier	Canada	7:46.96	+32.84	
19	4	I	Natsue Seki	Japan	7:47.43	+33.30	
20	8	O	Ariane Loignon	Canada	7:49.55	+35.42	
21	13	I	Erwina Ryś-Ferens	Poland	7:50.43	+36.30	
22	12	I	Nancy Swider-Peltz	United States	7:52.12	+37.99	
23	1O	O	Kathy Gordon	Canada	7:53.30	+39.17	
24	11	I	Minna Nystedt	Norway	7:54.11	+39.98	
25	6	O	Stéphanie Dumont	France	8:00.40	+46.27	
