= Doug Lewis (skier) =

American alpine skier

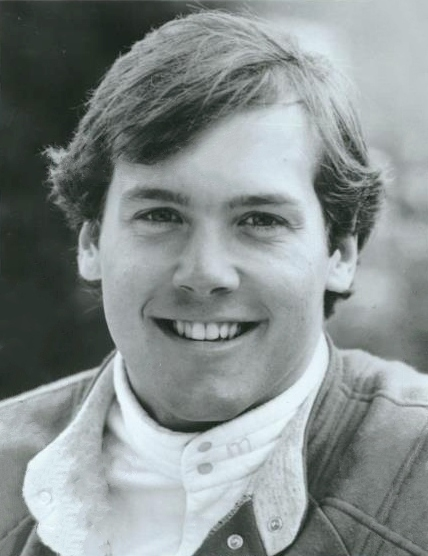
- Lewis in 1985

Personal information
- Full name: Douglas Grey Lewis
- Born: January 18, 1964 (age 62) Middlebury, Vermont, U.S.
- Height: 5 ft 9 in (1.75 m)

Skiing career
- Sport: Alpine skiing
- Retired: March 1988 (age 24)
- Disciplines: Downhill, super-G, giant slalom, combined
- World Cup debut: March 11, 1984 (age 20)

Olympics
- Teams: 2 – (1984, 1988)
- Medals: 0

World Championships
- Teams: 2 – (1985, 1987)
- Medals: 1 (0 gold)

World Cup
- Seasons: 5 – (1984–1988)
- Wins: 0
- Podiums: 1 – (1 DH)
- Overall titles: 0 – (39th in 1985)
- Discipline titles: 0 – (15th in DH, 1985)
Medal record
Representing the United States
World Championships
| Bronze medal – third place | 1985 Bormio | Downhill |

Douglas Grey Lewis (born January 18, 1964) is a former World Cup alpine ski racer with the U.S. Ski Team in the mid-1980s. Born in Middlebury, Vermont, he was a two-time Olympian in 1984 and 1988.

After competing in the 1984 Olympics at age 20, Lewis made his World Cup debut a month later in March 1984 with an 8th-place finish at Whistler, BC. The following season, Lewis had two World Cup top ten finishes and was the bronze medalist in the downhill at the 1985 World Championships at Bormio, Italy. He was unknown at that time, and having a bib number behind the best 15 racers he did gatecrash a party of three Swiss racers on the podium (and pushing away Franz Heinzer). His only World Cup podium came six months later, a second-place finish in Las Leñas, Argentina, in August 1985.

Lewis is currently an analyst for alpine ski racing with Universal Sports, and also runs a children's sports camp with locations in Waitsfield, Vermont, and Park City, Utah. He is a 1991 graduate of the University of Vermont.

== World Cup results ==
=== Season standings ===
| Season | Age | Overall | Slalom | Giant Slalom | Super-G | Downhill | Combined |
|---|---|---|---|---|---|---|---|
| 1984 | 20 | 79 | — | — | not awarded | 27 | — |
| 1985 | 21 | 59 | — | 51 | not awarded | 25 | — |
| 1986 | 22 | 39 | — | — | — | 15 | 36 |
| 1987 | 23 | 53 | — | — | — | 19 | — |
| 1988 | 24 | | | | | | |

- Points were only awarded for top fifteen finishes (see scoring system).

=== Top ten finishes ===
| Season | Date | Location | Discipline | Place |
|---|---|---|---|---|
| 1984 | 11 Mar 1984 | Whistler, BC, Canada | Downhill | 8th |
| 1985 | 15 Dec 1984 | Val Gardena, Italy | Downhill | 9th |
| 1985 | 11 Jan 1985 | Kitzbühel, Austria | Downhill | 10th |
| 1985 | (Italy) 1985 World Championships | | | |
| 1986 | 16 Aug 1985 | Las Leñas, Argentina | Downhill | 2nd |
| 1986 | 17 Jan 1986 | Kitzbühel, Austria | Downhill | 5th |
| 1986 | 8 Mar 1986 | (United States) Aspen, CO, USA | Downhill | 8th |
| 1987 | 28 Feb 1987 | Furano, Japan | Downhill | 7th |
| 1987 | 7 Mar 1987 | (United States) Aspen, CO, USA | Downhill | 9th |

== World championship results ==
| Year | Age | Slalom | Giant Slalom | Super-G | Downhill | Combined |
|---|---|---|---|---|---|---|
| 1985 | 21 | — | — | not run | 3 | — |
| 1987 | 23 | — | — | — | 29 | 17 |

== Olympic results ==
| Year | Age | Slalom | Giant Slalom | Super-G | Downhill | Combined |
|---|---|---|---|---|---|---|
| 1984 | 20 | — | — | not run | 24 | not run |
| 1988 | 24 | — | — | — | 32 | — |
