= Felix McGrath =

American alpine skier

Charles Felix McGrath
Personal information
- Born: 13 March 1963 (age 63) Princeton, New Jersey, U.S.
- Children: Atle Lie McGrath

Skiing career
- Country: United States
- Sport: Alpine skiing ♂
- Retired: 1990 (age 27)
- Disciplines: Slalom, giant slalom, combined
- World Cup debut: 1984

Olympics
- Teams: 1 – (1988)
- Medals: 0

World Championships
- Teams: 3 – (1985, 1987, 1989)
- Medals: 0

World Cup
- Seasons: 6 – (1985–1990)
- Wins: 0
- Podiums: 1 – (1 SL)
- Overall titles: 0 – (15th in 1988)
- Discipline titles: 0 – (3rd in SL, 1988)

Charles Francis Felix McGrath (born March 13, 1963) is a retired American World Cup alpine ski racer who competed in the Winter Olympics in 1988, and three World Championships.

== Career ==
McGrath raced for the United States Ski Team on the World Cup circuit from 1984 through 1990, and had one podium finish in slalom, runner-up to Alberto Tomba at Åre in 1988. He finished that season third in slalom and fifteenth overall.

As of 1987, he was the top U.S. ski racer, but was ranked 57th in the world. The Los Angeles Times wrote of his criticism for the lack of competency among the coaches, who were "putting exaggerated pressure on the racers." He felt that the coaches were not attuned to the steps required to develop relatively inexperienced skiers and were not cognizant of the personal training regimes of individual team members. At the World Championships in 1987, McGrath was tenth in the slalom.

McGrath was national champion five times. He became a ski instructor and coach at Waterville Valley in New Hampshire, and later for the ski team at the University of Vermont in Burlington. Ultimately, he became the head coach of the Norwegian women’s alpine team. He was named to Sports Illustrated 's 50 Greatest Sports Figures from Vermont in 1999.

While a World Cup racer, McGrath made a commercial for Alka-Seltzer Plus, which was shown during the Super Bowl in January 1988.

== World Cup results ==
=== Season standings ===
Season	Age	Overall	Slalom	Giant Slalom	Super G	Downhill	Combined
1985	21	98	45	—	—N/a	—	—
1986	22	78	36	—	—	—	—
1987	23	71	31	34	—	—	—
1988	24	15	3	22	—	—	14
1989	25	33	9	—	—	—	—
1990	26	51	18	—	—	—	—

- Points were only awarded for top fifteen finishes (see scoring system).

=== Race podiums ===
- 1 podium – (1 SL), 5 top fives

Season	Date	Location	Discipline	Place
1988	19 March 1988	Åre, Sweden	Slalom	2nd

== World Championship results ==
Year	Age	Slalom	Giant Slalom	Super-G	Downhill	Combined
1985	21	DNF1	—	not run	—	—
1987	23	10	—	—	—	13
1989	25	DNF1	21	—	—	—

== Olympic results ==
Year	Age	Slalom	Giant Slalom	Super-G	Downhill	Combined
1988	24	DNF1	13	—	—	—

== Personal life ==
Born in Princeton, New Jersey, McGrath grew up in Norwich, Vermont, where his father Bob (1935–2019) was a longtime art history professor at nearby Dartmouth College. McGrath married a Norwegian, Selma Lie, a cross-country ski racer for the University of Vermont; their son Atle Lie McGrath (b. 2000) is a World Cup alpine racer for the Norwegian ski team.

== Video ==
- YouTube – Alka-Seltzer Plus commercial (1987)
