= Wang Xiaoyan =

Wang Xiaoyan is the name of:

- Wang Xiaoyan (gymnast) (born 1968), Chinese gymnast
- Wang Xiaoyan (speed skater) (born 1969), Chinese speed skater
- Wang Xiaoyan (softball) (born 1970), Chinese softball player
