= Italy at the 1988 Winter Olympics =

- IOC code: ITA
- NOC: Italian National Olympic Committee
- Website: www.coni.it (in Italian)

in Calgary
- Competitors: 58 (42 men, 16 women) in 8 sports
- Flag bearer: Paul Hildgartner (luge)
- Medals Ranked 10th: Gold 2 Silver 1 Bronze 2 Total 5

Winter Olympics appearances (overview)
- 1924; 1928; 1932; 1936; 1948; 1952; 1956; 1960; 1964; 1968; 1972; 1976; 1980; 1984; 1988; 1992; 1994; 1998; 2002; 2006; 2010; 2014; 2018; 2022; 2026

Italy competed at the 1988 Winter Olympics in Calgary, Alberta, Canada, winning 2 gold, 1 silver and 2 bronze medals.

== Medalists ==
Medal	Name	Sport	Event	Date
Gold	Alberto Tomba	Alpine skiing	Men's giant slalom	25 February
Gold	Alberto Tomba	Alpine skiing	Men's slalom	27 February
Silver	Maurilio De Zolt	Cross-country skiing	Men's 50 kilometre freestyle	27 February
Bronze	Johann Passler	Biathlon	Individual	20 February
Bronze	Werner Kiem; Gottlieb Taschler; Johann Passler; Andreas Zingerle	Biathlon	Relay	26 February

== Competitors ==
The following is the list of number of competitors in the Games.

Sport	Men	Women	Total
Alpine skiing	8	3	11
Biathlon	6	–	6
Bobsleigh	9	–	9
Cross-country skiing	7	7	14
Figure skating	2	2	4
Luge	6	3	9
Ski jumping	2	–	2
Speed skating	2	1	3
Total	42	16	58

== Alpine skiing ==
Men

Athlete	Event	Race 1	Race 2	Total	
Athlete	Event	Time	Time	Time	Rank
Michael Mair	Downhill			DNF	–
Igor Cigolla	Downhill			2:05.85	31
Danilo Sbardellotto	Downhill			2:02.69	10
Alberto Tomba	Super-G			DNF	–
Carlo Gerosa	Super-G			1:45.82	26
Heinz Holzer	Super-G			1:42.88	11
Ivano Camozzi	Super-G			1:42.66	10
Heinz Holzer	Giant Slalom	1:08.08	1:05.20	2:13.28	27
Carlo Gerosa	Giant Slalom	1:06.90	1:04.75	2:11.65	17
Ivano Camozzi	Giant Slalom	1:05.86	1:02.91	2:08.77	4
Alberto Tomba	Giant Slalom	1:03.91	1:02.46	2:06.37	1st place, gold medalist(s)
Ivano Camozzi	Slalom	DNF	–	DNF	–
Carlo Gerosa	Slalom	53.06	DSQ	DSQ	–
Oswald Tötsch	Slalom	52.44	48.11	1:40.55	8
Alberto Tomba	Slalom	51.62	47.85	1:39.47	1st place, gold medalist(s)

Men's combined

Athlete	Downhill	Slalom		Total	
Athlete	Time	Time 1	Time 2	Points	Rank
Oswald Tötsch	1:57.83	44.32	42.32	134.14	18
Igor Cigolla	1:50.86	DNF	–	DNF	–
Danilo Sbardellotto	1:49.57	DNF	–	DNF	–

Women

Athlete	Event	Race 1	Race 2	Total	
Athlete	Event	Time	Time	Time	Rank
Michaela Marzola	Downhill			1:28.69	19
Michaela Marzola	Super-G			1:20.91	7
Nadia Bonfini	Giant Slalom	DSQ	–	DSQ	–
Paoletta Magoni	Giant Slalom	1:01.65	DNF	DNF	–
Nadia Bonfini	Slalom	51.95	DNF	DNF	–
Paoletta Magoni	Slalom	50.42	49.34	1:39.76	7

Women's combined

Athlete	Downhill	Slalom		Total	
Athlete	Time	Time 1	Time 2	Points	Rank
Michaela Marzola	1:17.95	43.65	44.57	85.34	10

== Biathlon ==
Men

Event	Athlete	Misses ^{1}	Time	Rank
10 km Sprint	Roberto Marchesi	2	27:36.7	33
10 km Sprint	Andreas Zingerle	2	26:33.0	15
10 km Sprint	Pieralberto Carrara	2	26:32.7	13
10 km Sprint	Johann Passler	2	26:07.7	8

Event	Athlete	Time	Misses	Adjusted time ^{2}	Rank
20 km	Andreas Zingerle	DSQ	–	DSQ	–
20 km	Werner Kiem	57:00.3	3	1'04:00.3	43
20 km	Gottlieb Taschler	55:53.6	3	58:53.6	11
20 km	Johann Passler	55:10.1	2	57:10.1	3rd place, bronze medalist(s)

Men's 4 x 7.5 km relay

Athletes	Race		
Athletes	Misses ^{1}	Time	Rank
Werner Kiem; Gottlieb Taschler; Johann Passler; Andreas Zingerle	0	1'23:51.5	3rd place, bronze medalist(s)

^{1} A penalty loop of 150 metres had to be skied per missed target.
^{2} One minute added per missed target.

== Bobsleigh ==
Sled	Athletes	Event	Run 1		Run 2		Run 3		Run 4		Total	
Sled	Athletes	Event	Time	Rank	Time	Rank	Time	Rank	Time	Rank	Time	Rank
ITA-1	Alex Wolf; Georg Beikircher	Two-man	59.35	28	59.65	9	1:00.32	9	1:00.03	17	3:59.35	17
ITA-2	Ivo Ferriani; Stefano Ticci	Two-man	58.25	14	1:00.60	24	1:01.08	19	1:00.21	19	4:00.14	19

Sled	Athletes	Event	Run 1		Run 2		Run 3		Run 4		Total	
Sled	Athletes	Event	Time	Rank	Time	Rank	Time	Rank	Time	Rank	Time	Rank
ITA-1	Alex Wolf; Pasquale Gesuito; Georg Beikircher; Stefano Ticci	Four-man	57.20	15	57.72	9	56.53	7	58.01	10	3:49.46	10
ITA-2	Roberto D'Amico; Thomas Rottensteiner; Paolo Scaramuzza; Andrea Meneghin	Four-man	57.69	20	58.65	21	57.50	20	58.04	11	3:51.88	19

== Cross-country skiing ==
Men

Event	Athlete	Race	
Event	Athlete	Time	Rank
15 km C	Gianfranco Polvara	43:08.3	14
15 km C	Giorgio Vanzetta	42:49.6	10
15 km C	Marco Albarello	42:48.6	9
15 km C	Maurilio De Zolt	42:31.2	6
30 km C	Silvano Barco	1'32:41.8	38
30 km C	Marco Albarello	1'26:09.1	8
30 km C	Gianfranco Polvara	1'26:02.7	7
30 km C	Giorgio Vanzetta	1'25:37.2	5
50 km F	Fausto Bormetti	2'10:20.7	18
50 km F	Albert Walder	2'09:19.6	16
50 km F	Gianfranco Polvara	2'08:40.3	10
50 km F	Maurilio De Zolt	2'05:36.4	2nd place, silver medalist(s)

C = Classical style, F = Freestyle

Men's 4 × 10 km relay

Athletes	Race	
Athletes	Time	Rank
Silvano Barco; Albert Walder; Giorgio Vanzetta; Maurilio De Zolt	1'46:16.7	5

Women

Event	Athlete	Race	
Event	Athlete	Time	Rank
5 km C	Gabriella Carrel	17:08.8	42
5 km C	Guidina Dal Sasso	16:26.4	27
5 km C	Clara Angerer	16:20.4	24
5 km C	Manuela Di Centa	15:57.2	18
10 km C	Manuela Di Centa	31:50.2	20
10 km C	Stefania Belmondo	31:47.2	19
10 km C	Bice Vanzetta	31:34.5	17
10 km C	Guidina Dal Sasso	31:16.7	11
20 km F	Elena Desderi	1'02:54.8	36
20 km F	Stefania Belmondo	1'01:36.9	29
20 km F	Guidina Dal Sasso	59:40.4	19
20 km F	Manuela Di Centa	57:55.2	6

C = Classical style, F = Freestyle

Women's 4 × 5 km relay

Athletes	Race	
Athletes	Time	Rank
Clara Angerer; Guidina Dal Sasso; Elena Desderi; Stefania Belmondo	1'04:23.6	10

== Figure skating ==
Men

Athlete	CF	SP	FS	TFP	Rank
Alessandro Riccitelli	20	20	22	42.0	21

Women

Athlete	CF	SP	FS	TFP	Rank
Beatrice Gelmini	15	17	11	26.8	11

Ice Dancing

Athletes	CD	OD	FD	TFP	Rank
Lia Trovati; Roberto Pelizzola	10	10	10	20.0	10

== Luge ==
Men

Athlete	Run 1		Run 2		Run 3		Run 4		Total	
Athlete	Time	Rank	Time	Rank	Time	Rank	Time	Rank	Time	Rank
Kurt Brugger	47.084	17	47.362	20	47.045	12	47.130	12	3:08.621	15
Paul Hildgartner	46.844	12	46.854	8	46.764	6	47.234	14	3:07.696	10
Hansjörg Raffl	46.590	7	46.971	12	46.893	10	47.071	11	3:07.525	8

(Men's) Doubles

Athletes	Run 1		Run 2		Total	
Athletes	Time	Rank	Time	Rank	Time	Rank
Kurt Brugger; Wilfried Huber	46.125	7	46.428	7	1:32.553	7
Bernhard Kammerer; Walter Brunner	46.381	11	46.790	10	1:33.171	9

Women

Athlete	Run 1		Run 2		Run 3		Run 4		Total	
Athlete	Time	Rank	Time	Rank	Time	Rank	Time	Rank	Time	Rank
Maria-Luise Rainer	47.142	16	46.947	10	47.064	14	46.992	15	3:08.145	15
Gerda Weissensteiner	46.814	14	47.183	14	46.908	13	46.760	13	3:07.665	14
Veronika Oberhuber	46.720	12	46.963	11	47.118	15	46.715	12	3:07.516	13

== Ski jumping ==
Athlete	Event	Jump 1		Jump 2		Total	
Athlete	Event	Distance	Points	Distance	Points	Points	Rank
Sandro Sambugaro	Normal hill	74.0	77.0	79.0	88.5	165.5	46
Virginio Lunardi	Normal hill	75.5	82.4	74.5	79.8	161.6	50
Virginio Lunardi	Large hill	100.0	85.4	89.0	65.5	150.9	45
Sandro Sambugaro	Large hill	100.0	85.4	94.5	76.2	161.6	39

== Speed skating ==
Men

Event	Athlete	Race	
Event	Athlete	Time	Rank
5000 m	Bruno Milesi	6:54.93	15
5000 m	Roberto Sighel	6:53.04	11
10,000 m	Bruno Milesi	14:23.84	13
10,000 m	Roberto Sighel	14:13.60	7

Women

Event	Athlete	Race	
Event	Athlete	Time	Rank
3000 m	Elena Belci	4:27.21	13
5000 m	Elena Belci	7:37.23	12
