= Ju Yeongdae =

Ju Yeongdae (Korean: 주영대) may refer to:

- Joo Young-dai (born 1966), South Korean biathlete
- Joo Young-dae (born 1973), South Korean para table tennis player
