= Robert Buchel =

Robert Buchel might refer to:

- Robert Büchel (born 1968), Liechtenstein former alpine skier
- Robert Buchel (reality television), featured on My 600-lb Life
