= Constanze Moser-Scandolo =

East German speed skater

Constanze Moser
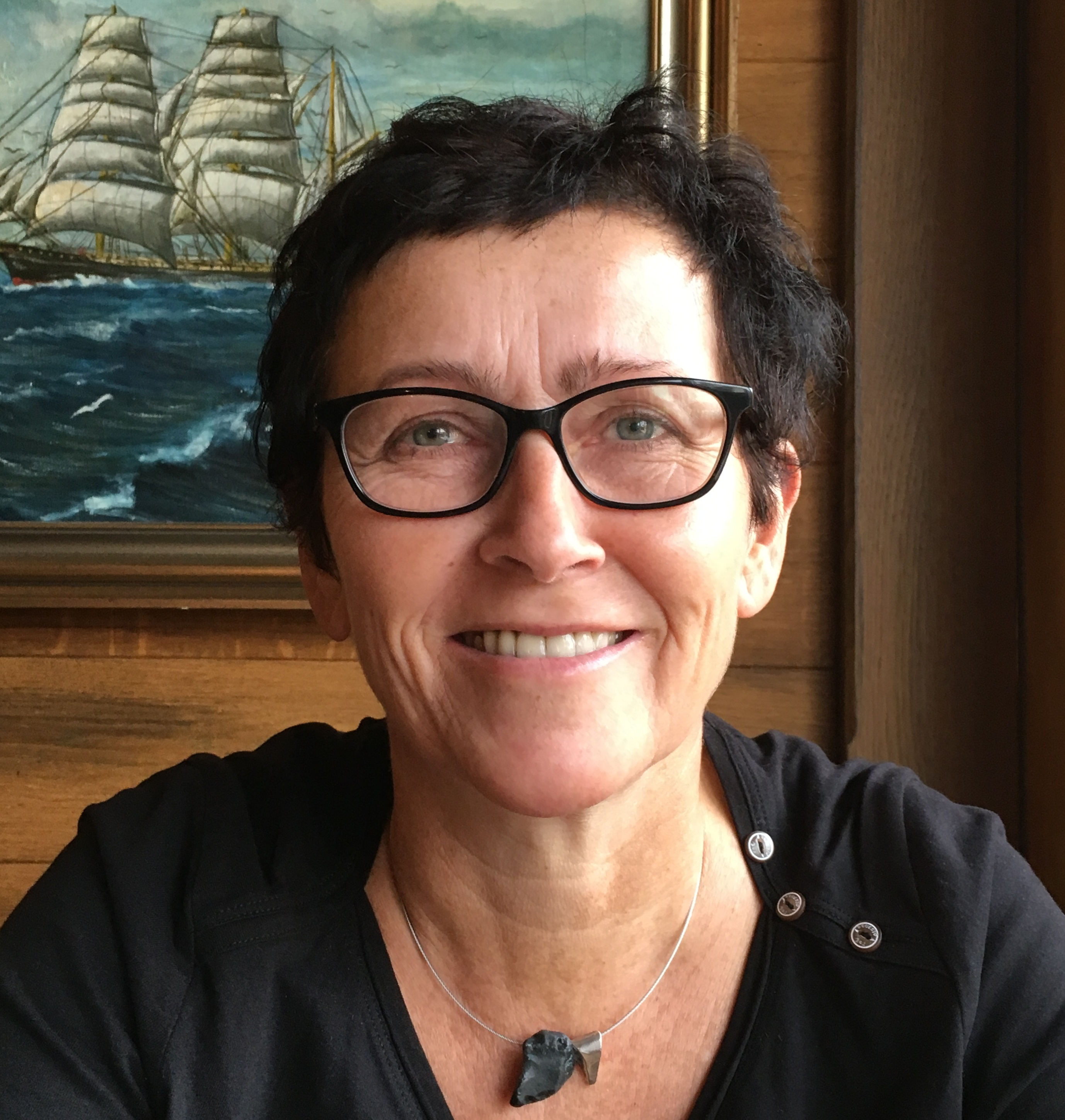
- Moser-Scandolo in 2016

Personal information
- Born: 4 July 1965 (age 60) Weimar, East Germany

Sport
- Country: Germany
- Sport: Speed skating
Medal record
Women's speed skating
Representing Germany
World Allround Championships
Gold medal – first place	1989 Lake Placid	Allround
Bronze medal – third place	1990 Calgary	Allround

Constanze Moser-Scandolo (born 4 July 1965) is a former World Champion speed skater who competed for East Germany.

== Short biography ==
Born as Constanze Scandolo in Weimar, East Germany, she started skating at the SC Turbine Erfurt skating club in Erfurt where she trained in the same group as Gunda Niemann and Heike Schalling. In 1988, she was at the Winter Olympics in Calgary, slated to compete in the 1,500 m. However, an injury forced her to withdraw just minutes before the start of her race. She had her best year in 1989 when she became World Allround Champion, won silver at the European Allround Championships, and also won the World Cup on the 1,500 m, as well as ending third on the 1,000 m and the 3,000/5,000 m. She also won 4 medals at various German Championships in that same year. In 1990, she won a bronze medal at the World Allround Championships. After the birth of her daughter Elisa Moser on 27 November 1990, she ended her speed skating career. Currently, she works at the Thüringen Department of Economics.

== Medals ==
An overview of medals won by Moser-Scandolo at important championships she participated in, listing the years in which she won each:

Championships	Gold medal	Silver medal	Bronze medal
Winter Olympics			
World Allround	1989		1990
World Cup	1989 (1,500 m)	1990 (1,500 m)	1989 (1,000 m); 1989 (3,000/5,000 m)
European Allround		1989	
German Allround	1986	1989	
German Sprint			
German Single Distance		1989 (1,500 m); 1990 (1,500 m)	1985 (3,000 m); 1988 (1,500 m); 1988 (3,000 m); 1988 (5,000 m); 1989 (3,000 m); 1989 (5,000 m); 1990 (3,000 m)

== Personal records ==
To put these personal records in perspective, the last column (WR) lists the official world records on the dates that Scandolo-Moser skated her personal records.

Distance	Result	Date	Location	WR
500 m	40.83	11 February 1989	Calgary	39.10
1,000 m	1:20.69	11 March 1989	Inzell	1:17.65
1,500 m	2:02.65	11 February 1989	Calgary	1:59.30
3,000 m	4:18.68	12 February 1989	Calgary	4:11.94
5,000 m	7:29.88	11 February 1990	Calgary	7:14.13

== Sources ==
- Constanze Scandolo at SkateResults.com
- Constanze Moser-Scandolo at DESG (Deutsche Eisschnelllauf Gemeinschaft) (in German)
- Personal records from Jakub Majerski's Speedskating Database
