= Joung Young-suk =

South Korean biathlete (born 1967)

Personal information
- Nationality: South Korean
- Born: 6 October 1967 (age 57)

Sport
- Sport: Biathlon

Joung Young-suk (born 6 October 1967) is a South Korean biathlete. He competed in the sprint event at the 1988 Winter Olympics.
