= Patrik Hasler (skier) =

Liechtenstein cross-country skier (born 1947)

Personal information
- Nationality: Liechtenstein
- Born: 26 October 1947 (age 77)

Sport
- Sport: Cross-country skiing

Patrik Hasler (born 26 October 1947) is a Liechtensteiner cross-country skier. He competed in the men's 15 kilometre classical event at the 1988 Winter Olympics.
