= Deborah Nordyke =

American biathlete (born 1962)

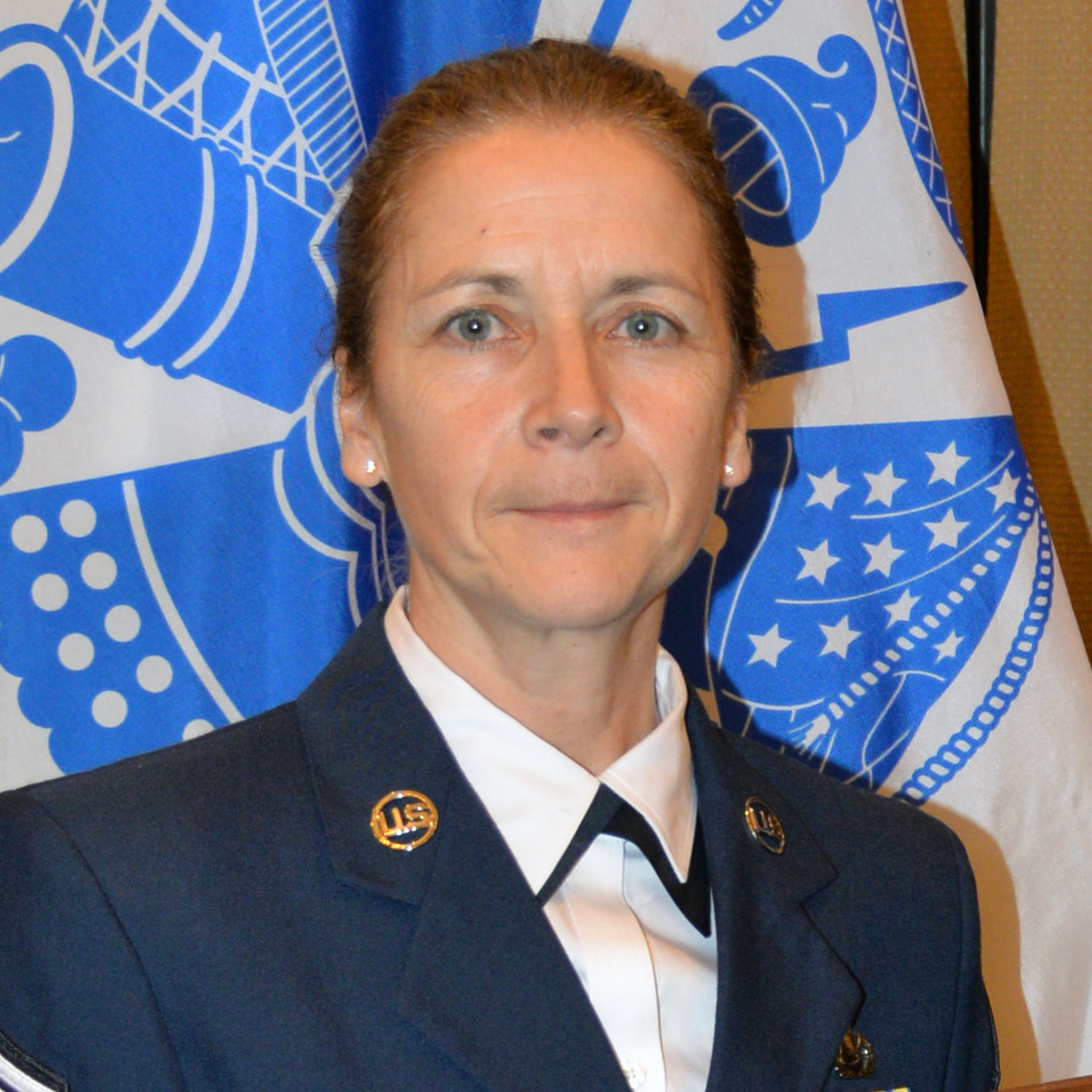
- Nordyke in 2016

Personal information
- Born: May 20, 1962 (age 64) Bethalto, Illinois, United States
- Education: Bartlett High School; University of Alaska Anchorage
- Spouse: Curtis Schreiner

Sport
- Sport: Biathlon
- Rank: Master Sergeant (NYANG)
- College team: Alaska Anchorage Seawolves

Deborah L. Nordyke (born May 20, 1962) is an American biathlete. She competed in the two events at the 1998 Winter Olympics.

In 1980, Nordyke graduated from Bartlett High School in Anchorage, Alaska where she competed in gymnastics and track and field. After high school, she attended the University of Alaska Anchorage and planned to become a teacher. She had never skied until joining the Air National Guard and the Alaska Anchorage Seawolves ski team. She did not begin training regularly in biathlon until 1992, at which time she was working as an elementary school teacher in Oregon. She participated in summer biathlon competitions in the offseason.

As of January 1998, Nordyke was engaged to be married to fellow American Olympic biathlete Curtis Schreiner of Day, New York and the couple hoped to be married that year. In June 1998, she was granted a transfer to the 109th Airlift Wing of the New York Air National Guard. Her first child with Schreiner was born in February 1999. As of February 2016, she and Schreiner were living with their three children in Hadley, New York where she was working as a substitute teacher while continuing to serve in the National Guard.
