= Konstantin Ritter =

Liechtenstein cross-country skier (born 1964)

Personal information
- Born: 22 April 1964 (age 60); Eschen, Liechtenstein

Sport
- Sport: Cross-country skiing

Konstantin Ritter (born 22 April 1964) is a Liechtensteiner cross-country skier. He competed at the 1984 Winter Olympics and the 1988 Winter Olympics.
