= Anton Lengauer-Stockner =

Austrian biathlete (born 1961)

Personal information
- Nationality: Austrian
- Born: 18 November 1961 (age 64) Schwoich, Austria

Sport
- Sport: Biathlon

Anton Lengauer-Stockner (born 18 November 1961) is an Austrian biathlete. He competed in the relay event at the 1988 Winter Olympics.
