= Dan Doll =

Canadian luger (born 1969)

Personal information
- Born: 6 August 1969 (age 55); Calgary, Alberta, Canada

Sport
- Sport: Luge

Dan Doll (born 6 August 1969) is a Canadian luger. He competed at the 1988 Winter Olympics and the 1992 Winter Olympics.
