= Sam Salmon =

Canadian luger (born 1969)

Personal information
- Full name: Harry Salmon
- Nationality: Canadian
- Born: 11 May 1969 (age 56)

Sport
- Sport: Luge

Harry "Sam" Salmon (born 11 May 1969) is a Canadian luger. He competed in the men's doubles event at the 1988 Winter Olympics. His sister is Kathy Salmon.
