= Antero Lähde =

Finnish biathlete

Personal information
- Nationality: Finnish
- Born: 13 December 1964 (age 60); Kauvatsa, Finland

Sport
- Sport: Biathlon

Antero Lähde (born 13 December 1964) is a Finnish biathlete. He competed in the sprint event at the 1988 Winter Olympics.
