= Greg Haydenluck =

Canadian athlete (born 1958)

Greg Haydenluck (born July 7, 1958) is a Canadian track and field athlete and bobsledder who competed from the mid-1970s to the early 1990s.

== Track and field career ==
A native of Manitoba, Haydenluck competed as a sprinter while in high school. This included setting provincial records both in 200 (rural provincial) and 400 metres (rural provincial and provincial) events in 1977, records that still stood as of the 2004–05 school year. His success as a sprinter earned him a scholarship to the University of South Dakota. While at South Dakota, Haydenluck switched to decathlon and earned All-American honors both in 1979 and in 1982. He would earn Canada's national championship in the decathlon in 1985.

== Bobsleigh career ==
By the late 1980s Haydenluck had switched to bobsleigh. Competing in two Winter Olympics, he earned his best result of tenth in the two-man event at Calgary in 1988 Winter Olympics. Haydenluck's best finish in the Bobsleigh World Cup championships was second in the two-man event in 1989–90. He retired after the 1992 Winter Olympics in Albertville.

== Post career ==
As of 2006, Haydenluck was physical education teacher in Central Technical School. He was inducted into the University of South Dakota Athletic Hall of Fame in 2001.

Haydenluck was inducted into the Manitoba Sports Hall of Fame in 2008.
