= Aleksandar Simeonov (bobsleigh) =

Bulgarian bobsledder

Personal information
- Born: 25 April 1963 (age 63)

Sport
- Sport: Bobsled

Aleksandar Simeonov (Bulgarian: Александър Симеонов, born 25 April 1963) is a retired Bulgarian bobsledder. He competed in the two-man and four-man events at the 1988 Winter Olympics and placed 22nd–24th.
