= Roberto Marchesi =

Italian biathlete (born 1966)

Personal information
- Nationality: Italian
- Born: 10 April 1966 (age 58); Bergamo, Italy

Sport
- Sport: Biathlon

Roberto Marchesi (born 10 April 1966) is an Italian biathlete. He competed in the sprint event at the 1988 Winter Olympics.
