= Wang Xiaoyan (speed skater) =

Chinese speed skater

Personal information
- Nationality: Chinese
- Born: 31 July 1969 (age 55)

Sport
- Sport: Speed skating

Wang Xiaoyan (Chinese: 王晓燕, born 31 July 1969) is a Chinese speed skater. She competed in the women's 5000 metres at the 1988 Winter Olympics.
