= Stefan Shalamanov =

Bulgarian alpine skier (born 1970)

Personal information
- Nationality: Bulgarian
- Born: 27 January 1970 (age 56) Sofia, Bulgaria

Sport
- Sport: Alpine skiing

Stefan Shalamanov (Bulgarian: Стефан Шаламанов, born 27 January 1970) is a Bulgarian alpine skier. He competed in two events at the 1988 Winter Olympics.
