= Jean-Paul Giachino =

French biathlete (born 1963)

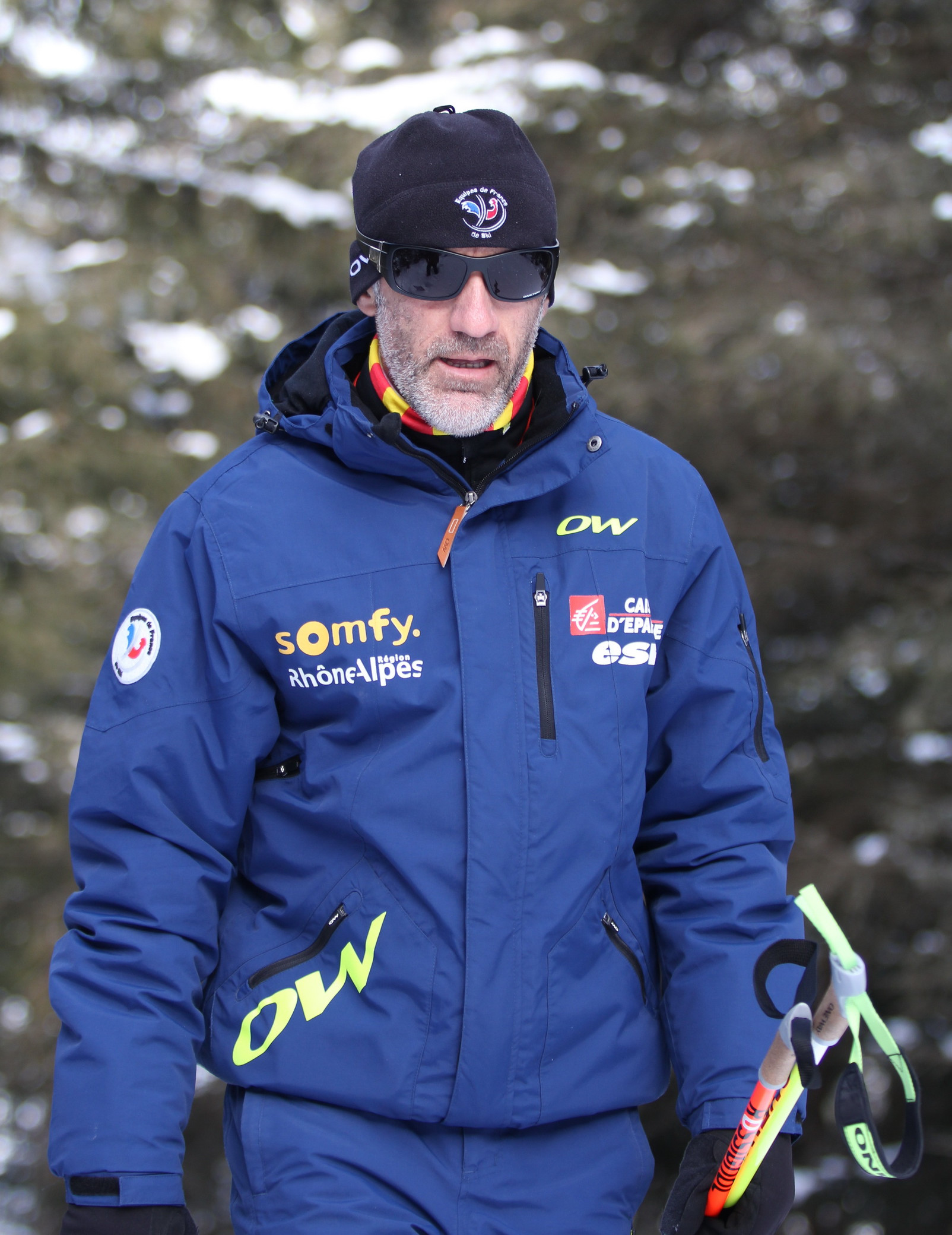
- Jean-Paul Giachino in 2013

Personal information
- Nationality: French
- Born: 3 January 1963 (age 62)

Sport
- Sport: Biathlon

Jean-Paul Giachino (born 3 January 1963) is a French biathlete. He competed in the 20 km individual event at the 1988 Winter Olympics.
