= Ben Lamarche =

Canadian speed skater

Benoît Lamarche
Personal information
- Born: 7 July 1966 (age 59) Quebec City, Quebec, Canada

Sport
- Sport: Speed skating

Benoît Lamarche (born 7 July 1966) is a Canadian speed skater. He competed at the 1984 Winter Olympics and the 1988 Winter Olympics.

Ben Lamarche is the father of Pierre Olivier Lamarche, Béatrice Lamarche, and Catherine Lamarche and the older brother of Marie-Pierre Lamarche.
