= Chantal Côté =

Canadian speed skater

Personal information
- Born: 16 February 1964 (age 61); Chibougamau, Quebec, Canada

Sport
- Sport: Speed skating

Chantal Côté (born 16 February 1964) is a Canadian speed skater. She competed in two events at the 1988 Winter Olympics.
