= Mano Ketenzhiev =

Bulgarian cross-country skier (born 1963)

Personal information
- Nationality: Bulgarian
- Born: 14 July 1963 (age 61)

Sport
- Sport: Cross-country skiing

Mano Ketenzhiev (born 14 July 1963) is a Bulgarian cross-country skier. He competed in the men's 15 kilometre classical event at the 1988 Winter Olympics.
