= Jürgen Wirth =

German biathlete

Personal information
- Nationality: German
- Born: 20 June 1965 (age 59); Großbreitenbach, East Germany

Sport
- Sport: Biathlon

Jürgen Wirth (born 20 June 1965) is a German former biathlete. He competed in the 20 km individual event at the 1988 Winter Olympics, representing East Germany.
