= Harington Telford =

Canadian luger (born 1966)

Personal information
- Born: 24 August 1966 (age 60) Calgary, Alberta, Canada

Sport
- Sport: Luge

Harington Telford (born 24 August 1966) is a Canadian luger. He competed at the 1988 Winter Olympics and the 1992 Winter Olympics.
