= Shelley Rhead-Skarvan =

Canadian speed skater

Personal information
- Born: 16 February 1965 (age 60); Moose Jaw, Saskatchewan, Canada

Sport
- Sport: Speed skating

Shelley Rhead-Skarvan (born 16 February 1965) is a Canadian speed skater. She competed at the 1988 Winter Olympics and the 1992 Winter Olympics.
