= Caroline Maheux =

Canadian speed skater

Personal information
- Born: 27 April 1969 (age 56) Sherbrooke, Quebec, Canada

Sport
- Sport: Speed skating

Caroline Maheux (born 27 April 1969) is a Canadian speed skater. She competed in the women's 1500 metres at the 1988 Winter Olympics.
