= Kathy Salmon =

Canadian luger

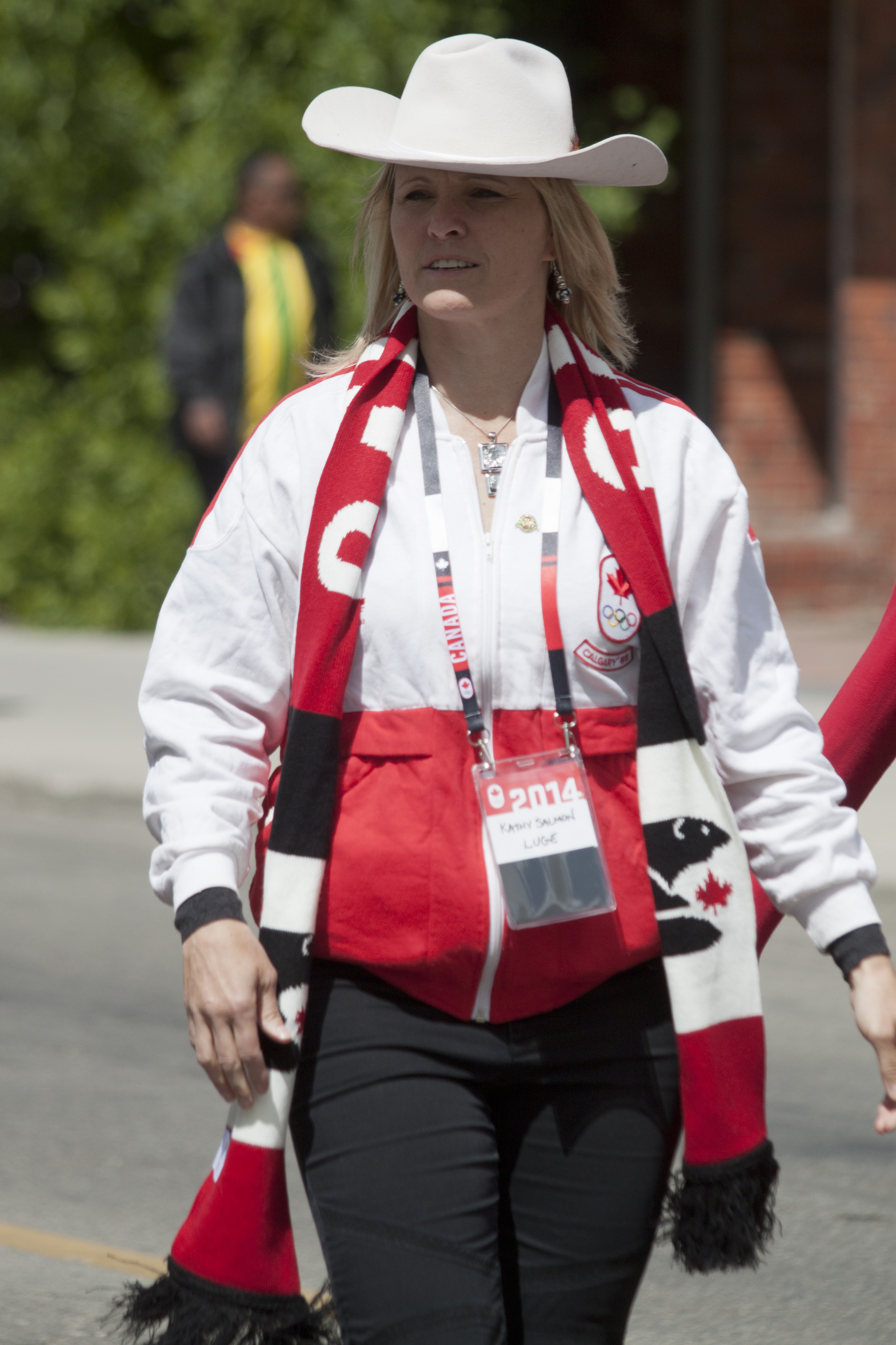
- Salmon in Parade of Champions in Calgary (2014)

Personal information
- Full name: Katherine Salmon
- Nationality: Canadian
- Born: March 23, 1968 (age 57) Iserlohn, Germany

Sport
- Country: Canada
- Updated on 7 June 2014

Katherine Salmon (born March 23, 1968, in Iserlohn, Germany) is a Canadian former Olympic luge athlete. Her brother is Harry "Sam" Salmon.

She came in 19th in the Women's singles in Luge at the 1988 Winter Olympics in Calgary. She finished 16th when she competed again at the 1992 Winter Olympics in Albertville. She was a six-time Canadian Champion. Her best finish was 6th in the 1989 Luge World Cup in Calgary.

After she did not make the 1994 Canada Olympic Team, Salmon enrolled as a student at the University of Calgary. The Alberta Sport Council hired her as an Alberta Games and Marketing Coordinator. She launched KidSport in Alberta after the program was brought to the Canadian Council of Provincial and Territorial Sport Federations by Sport BC. She was the first staff person to work with many other Alberta volunteers to implement the program in communities throughout the province. She is the current Provincial Chair of KidSport Alberta, having continued her involvement for 20 years. More than $11 million has been distributed to more than 60,000 Alberta kids for their sport registration fees.

She graduated with distinction with a Bachelor of Education from the University of Calgary and went on to obtain her master's in Education, Teaching English as a Second Language. She is a mother of three and works for the Calgary Board of Education as the principal of Peter Lougheed school in Calgary, Alberta.

She participated in Canadian Living magazine's Whole Life Makeover from 2004 to 2005. She now competes in triathlons on a recreational basis.
