= André Benoit (luger) =

Canadian luger (born 1962)

Personal information
- Born: 16 October 1962 (age 62); Sainte-Foy, Quebec, Canada

Sport
- Sport: Luge

André Benoit (born 16 October 1962) is a Canadian luger. He competed at the 1988 Winter Olympics and the 1992 Winter Olympics.
