= Todor Makhov =

Bulgarian cross-country skier (born 1961)

Personal information
- Nationality: Bulgarian
- Born: 25 October 1961 (age 63)

Sport
- Sport: Cross-country skiing

Todor Makhov (born 25 October 1961) is a Bulgarian cross-country skier. He competed in the men's 15 kilometre classical event at the 1988 Winter Olympics.
