= Franz Schuler =

Austrian biathlete (born 1962)

Olympic medal record

Men's Biathlon

World championship
Silver medal – second place	1986 Oslo	10 km sprint

Franz Schuler (born 3 October 1962) is a former Austrian biathlete and police officer, who competed as a member of the Polizeisportverein (police sports club) Innsbruck. He was born in Kufstein.

== Selected results ==
- 1984:
  - 8th, Winter Olympics 4 × 7.5 kilometres relay (together with Rudolf Horn, Walter Hörl and Alfred Eder)
  - 30th, Winter Olympics Men's 20 kilometres
- 1986:
  - 2nd, World Championships 10 kilometres
- 1988:
  - 4th, Winter Olympics 4 × 7.5 kilometres relay (together with Anton Lengauer-Stockner, Bruno Hofstätter and Alfred Eder)
  - 17th, Winter Olympics Men's 10 kilometres
  - 36th, Winter Olympics Men's 20 kilometres
- 1992:
  - 12th, Winter Olympics 4 × 7.5 kilometres relay (together with Bruno Hofstätter, Egon Leitner and Ludwig Gredler)
  - 21st, Winter Olympics Men's 10 kilometres
  - 49th, Winter Olympics Men's 20 kilometres
- 1994:
  - 9th, Winter Olympics 4 × 7.5 kilometres relay (together with Wolfgang Perner, Ludwig Gredler and Martin Pfurtscheller)
  - 30th, Winter Olympics Men's 10 kilometres
  - 48th, Winter Olympics Men's 20 kilometres
