= Elliot Archilla =

Puerto Rican biathlete

Personal information
- Nationality: Puerto Rican
- Born: 19 March 1946 (age 79)

Sport
- Sport: Biathlon

Elliot Archilla (born 19 March 1946) is a Puerto Rican biathlete. He competed in the 20 km individual event at the 1988 Winter Olympics.
