= Khristo Kovachki =

Bulgarian biathlete (born 1967)

Personal information
- Nationality: Bulgarian
- Born: 23 March 1967 (age 58)

Sport
- Sport: Biathlon

Achievements and titles
- Olympic finals: 1988 Winter Olympics

Khristo Kovachki (Bulgarian: Христо Ковачки; born 23 March 1967) is a Bulgarian biathlete. He competed in the 20 km individual event at the 1988 Winter Olympics.
