= Kathy Gordon =

Canadian speed skater

Personal information
- Nationality: Canadian
- Born: 18 July 1967 (age 58) Nanaimo, British Columbia, Canada

Sport
- Sport: Speed skating

Kathy Gordon (born 18 July 1967) is a Canadian speed skater. She competed in the women's 5000 metres at the 1988 Winter Olympics.
