= Dennis Lawrence (cross-country skier) =

Canadian cross-country skier

Dennis Lawrence (born 25 October 1965) is a Canadian former cross-country skier who competed in the 1988 Winter Olympics.

Results
Games	Age	City	Sport	Event	Team	Rank
Winter 1988	22	Calgary	Cross Country Skiing	Men's 15 kilometres	Canada	47
Winter 1988	22	Calgary	Cross Country Skiing	Men's 50 kilometres	Canada	43
Winter 1988	22	Calgary	Cross Country Skiing	Men's 4 X 10kilometres relay	Canada	9
