= Georg Beikircher =

Italian bobsledder (born 1963)

Personal information
- Nationality: Italian
- Born: 16 March 1963 (age 62); Brunico, Italy

Sport
- Sport: Bobsleigh

Georg Beikircher (born 16 March 1963) is an Italian bobsledder. He competed at the 1984 Winter Olympics and the 1988 Winter Olympics.
