= Nikolay Botev =

Bulgarian bobsledder (born 1963)

Personal information
- Nationality: Bulgarian
- Born: 29 January 1963 (age 62); Ruse, Bulgaria

Sport
- Sport: Bobsleigh

Nikolay Botev (Bulgarian: Николай Ботев, born 29 January 1963) is a Bulgarian bobsledder. He competed in the two man and the four man events at the 1988 Winter Olympics.
