= Alex Wolf (bobsleigh) =

Italian bobsledder (born 1956)

Personal information
- Nationality: Italian
- Born: 18 March 1956 (age 69); Lagundo, Italy

Sport
- Sport: Bobsleigh

Alex Wolf (born 18 March 1956) is an Italian bobsledder. He competed at the 1984 Winter Olympics and the 1988 Winter Olympics.
