= Alejandro Giró =

Argentine biathlete (born 1970)

Personal information
- Nationality: Argentine
- Born: 6 June 1970 (age 56)

Sport
- Sport: Biathlon

Alejandro Giró (born 6 June 1970) is an Argentine biathlete. He competed in the 20 km individual event at the 1988 Winter Olympics.
