= Gustavo Giró =

Argentine biathlete (born 1968)

Personal information
- Nationality: Argentine
- Born: 14 October 1968 (age 58)

Sport
- Sport: Biathlon

Gustavo Giró (born 14 October 1968) is an Argentine biathlete. He competed in the 20 km individual event at the 1988 Winter Olympics.
