= Gregor Hoop =

Liechtenstein alpine skier (born 1967)

Gregor Hoop (22 May 1967 – 27 August 1990) was a Liechtensteiner alpine skier who competed in the 1988 Winter Olympics.
