= Juha Tella =

Finnish biathlete

Personal information
- Nationality: Finnish
- Born: 9 October 1960 (age 66) Ruokolahti, Finland

Sport
- Sport: Biathlon

Juha Tella (born 9 October 1960) is a Finnish biathlete. He competed in the 20 km individual event at the 1988 Winter Olympics.
