= Tadashi Nakamura (biathlete) =

Japanese biathlete (born 1956)

Personal information
- Nationality: Japanese
- Born: 16 July 1956 (age 70) Hokkaido, Japan

Sport
- Sport: Biathlon

Tadashi Nakamura (中村 忠, Nakamura Tadashi; born 16 July 1956) is a Japanese biathlete. He competed in the 20 km individual event at the 1988 Winter Olympics.
