= Marie-Pierre Lamarche =

Canadian speed skater

Personal information
- Born: 20 October 1968 (age 56); Quebec City, Quebec, Canada

Sport
- Sport: Speed skating

Marie-Pierre Lamarche (born 20 October 1968) is a Canadian speed skater. She competed in the women's 1000 metres at the 1988 Winter Olympics.
