= Kim Yong-woon =

South Korean biathlete (born 1969)

Personal information
- Nationality: South Korean
- Born: 17 March 1969 (age 56)

Sport
- Sport: Biathlon

Kim Yong-woon (born 17 March 1969) is a South Korean biathlete. He competed in the 20 km individual event at the 1988 Winter Olympics.
