= Akihiro Takizawa =

Japanese biathlete (born 1961)

Personal information
- Nationality: Japanese
- Born: 25 November 1961 (age 63); Niigata, Japan

Sport
- Sport: Biathlon

Akihiro Takizawa (滝澤 明博, Takizawa Akihiro, born 25 November 1961) is a Japanese biathlete. He competed in the 20 km individual event at the 1988 Winter Olympics.
