= Éric Claudon =

French biathlete (born 1961)

Personal information
- Nationality: French
- Born: 10 July 1961 (age 63); Cornimont, France

Sport
- Sport: Biathlon

Éric Claudon (born 10 July 1961) is a French biathlete. He competed at the 1984 Winter Olympics and the 1988 Winter Olympics.
