= Jean Pichette =

Canadian speed skater

Personal information
- Born: 19 July 1963 (age 61); Lévis, Quebec, Canada

Sport
- Sport: Speed skating

Jean Pichette (born 19 July 1963) is a Canadian speed skater. He competed at the 1984 Winter Olympics and the 1988 Winter Olympics.
