= Werner Kiem =

Italian biathlete (born 1962)

Olympic medal record

Men's biathlon
Bronze medal – third place	1988 Calgary	4 x 7.5 km relay

World championships
Bronze medal – third place	1986 Oslo	4 x 7.5 km relay

Werner Kiem (born 30 November 1962) is a former Italian biathlete.

Kiem won bronze medals in the 4 x 7.5 km relay with teammates Gottlieb Taschler, Johann Passler and Andreas Zingerle at the 1986 Biathlon World Championships in Oslo and the 1988 Olympic Games in Calgary, Alberta, Canada.

== Further notable results ==
- 1986: 1st, Italian championships of biathlon, sprint
- 1987: 2nd, Italian championships of biathlon, sprint
