= Adrián Bíreš =

Slovak alpine skier (born 1969)

Adrián Bireš
Personal information
- Nationality: Slovak
- Born: 18 May 1969 (age 57) Banská Bystrica, Czechoslovakia

Sport
- Sport: Alpine skiing

Adrián Bireš (born 18 May 1969) is a Slovak alpine skier. He competed in five events at the 1988 Winter Olympics as part of the Czechoslovak olympic delegation.
