= Carl Davies =

British biathlete (born 1964)

Personal information
- Nationality: British
- Born: 30 July 1964 (age 62) Leeds, England

Sport
- Sport: Biathlon

Carl Davies (born 30 July 1964) is a British biathlete. He competed in the 20 km individual event at the 1988 Winter Olympics.
