= Paget Stewart =

Canadian biathlete

Personal information
- Full name: Paget John Stewart
- Born: 16 April 1963 Winnipeg, Manitoba, Canada
- Died: 7 October 2015 (aged 52) Brule, Alberta, Canada

Sport
- Sport: Biathlon

Paget John Stewart (16 April 1963 – 7 October 2015) was a Canadian biathlete who competed in the 1988 Winter Olympics. He committed suicide in 2015.
