= Peter Sjödén =

Swedish biathlete (born 1967)

Personal information
- Nationality: Swedish
- Born: 14 October 1967 (age 57); Älvdalen, Sweden

Sport
- Sport: Biathlon

Peter Sjödén (born 14 October 1967) is a Swedish biathlete. He competed in the 20 km individual event at the 1988 Winter Olympics.
