= Andrew Paul (biathlete) =

Australian biathlete

Andrew Paul is an Australian biathlete who competed at two Winter Olympics, in 1984 and 1988. He was the first Australian biathlete to compete at the Olympics. On his debut, he came 50th and 47th out of 63 and 62 competitors respectively in the 10 km and 20 km events. In 1988, he came 62nd and 57th out of 72 and 68 racers in the same events.
