= Ariane Loignon =

Canadian speed skater

Personal information
- Born: 2 May 1965 (age 59); Repentigny, Quebec, Canada

Sport
- Sport: Speed skating

Ariane Loignon (born 2 May 1965) is a Canadian speed skater. She competed in five events at the 1988 Winter Olympics.
