= Mark Langin =

British biathlete (born 1962)

Personal information
- Nationality: British
- Born: 18 May 1962 (age 64) Tyldesley, England

Sport
- Sport: Biathlon

Mark Langin (born 18 May 1962) is a British biathlete. He competed in the 20 km individual event at the 1988 Winter Olympics.
