= Shin Young-sun =

South Korean biathlete (born 1969)

Personal information
- Nationality: South Korean
- Born: 30 October 1969 (age 55)

Sport
- Sport: Biathlon

Shin Young-sun (born 30 October 1969) is a South Korean biathlete. He competed in the 20 km individual event at the 1988 Winter Olympics.

In 2014, he became the head coach of the national biathlon team at the 22nd Winter Olympics in Sochi.
