= Silvio Wille =

Liechtenstein alpine (born 1966)

Silvio Wille (born 16 May 1966) is a Liechtensteiner former alpine skier who competed in the 1988 Winter Olympics.
