= Peter Forras =

Australian alpine skier (born 1964)

Personal information
- Nationality: Australian
- Born: 13 January 1964 (age 61)

Sport
- Sport: Alpine skiing

Peter Forras (born 13 January 1964) is an Australian former alpine skier. He competed in two events at the 1988 Winter Olympics.
