= Gordon Goplen =

Canadian speed skater

Personal information
- Born: 1 May 1964 (age 60); Saskatoon, Saskatchewan, Canada

Sport
- Sport: Speed skating

Gordon Goplen (born 1 May 1964) is a Canadian speed skater. He competed in two events at the 1988 Winter Olympics. He was inducted into the Saskatoon Sports Hall of Fame in 1999.
