= Koichi Sato (biathlete) =

Japanese biathlete (born 1956)

Personal information
- Nationality: Japanese
- Born: 5 February 1956 (age 70) Aomori, Japan

Sport
- Sport: Biathlon

Koichi Sato (佐藤 幸一, Satō Kōichi; born 5 February 1956) is a Japanese biathlete. He competed in the 20 km individual event at the 1988 Winter Olympics.
