= Arto Jääskeläinen =

Finnish biathlete

Personal information
- Nationality: Finnish
- Born: 9 October 1960 (age 64); Orimattila, Finland

Sport
- Sport: Biathlon

Arto Jääskeläinen (born 9 October 1960) is a Finnish biathlete. He competed at the 1984 Winter Olympics and the 1988 Winter Olympics.
