= Tapio Piipponen =

Finnish biathlete

Personal information
- Nationality: Finnish
- Born: 21 June 1957 (age 67); Sotkamo, Finland

Sport
- Sport: Biathlon

Tapio Piipponen (born 21 June 1957) is a Finnish biathlete. He competed at the 1984 Winter Olympics and the 1988 Winter Olympics.
