= Joo Young-dai =

South Korean biathlete

Personal information
- Nationality: South Korean
- Born: 20 September 1966 (age 58)

Sport
- Sport: Biathlon

Joo Young-dai (Korean: 주영대; RR: Ju Yeongdae, born 20 September 1966) is a South Korean biathlete. He competed in the 20 km individual event at the 1988 Winter Olympics.
