= Vasil Bozhilov =

Bulgarian biathlete (born 1967)

Personal information
- Nationality: Bulgarian
- Born: 18 September 1967 (age 57)

Sport
- Sport: Biathlon

Vasil Bozhilov (born 18 September 1967) is a Bulgarian biathlete. He competed in the 20 km individual event at the 1988 Winter Olympics.
