= Trevor King (biathlete) =

British biathlete (born 1960)

Personal information
- Nationality: British
- Born: 28 May 1960 (age 65) Southampton, England

Sport
- Sport: Biathlon

Trevor King (born 28 May 1960) is a British biathlete. He competed at the 1984 Winter Olympics and the 1988 Winter Olympics.

== Personal life ==
King's daughter, Dani Rowe, won an Olympic gold medal in the team pursuit at the 2012 Summer Olympics. He became a policeman after his sporting career ended.
