= Jamie Kallio =

Canadian biathlete (born 1965)

Jamie Kallio (born 1 November 1965 in Sudbury, Ontario) is a Canadian former biathlete who competed in the 1988 Winter Olympics. He competed both in the Men's 20 kilometers race, where he scored rank 59, and the Men's 4 x 7.5 kilometers relay, where he finished rank 15.
