= Robert Büchel =

Liechtenstein alpine skier (born 1968)

Robert Büchel (born 16 June 1968) is a Liechtensteiner former alpine skier who competed in the 1988 Winter Olympics.
