= Mike Carney =

Canadian alpine skier (born 1966)

Mike Carney (born 13 April 1966 in Squamish, British Columbia) is a Canadian former alpine skier who competed in the 1988 Winter Olympics.
