= Curt Schreiner =

American biathlete (born 1967)

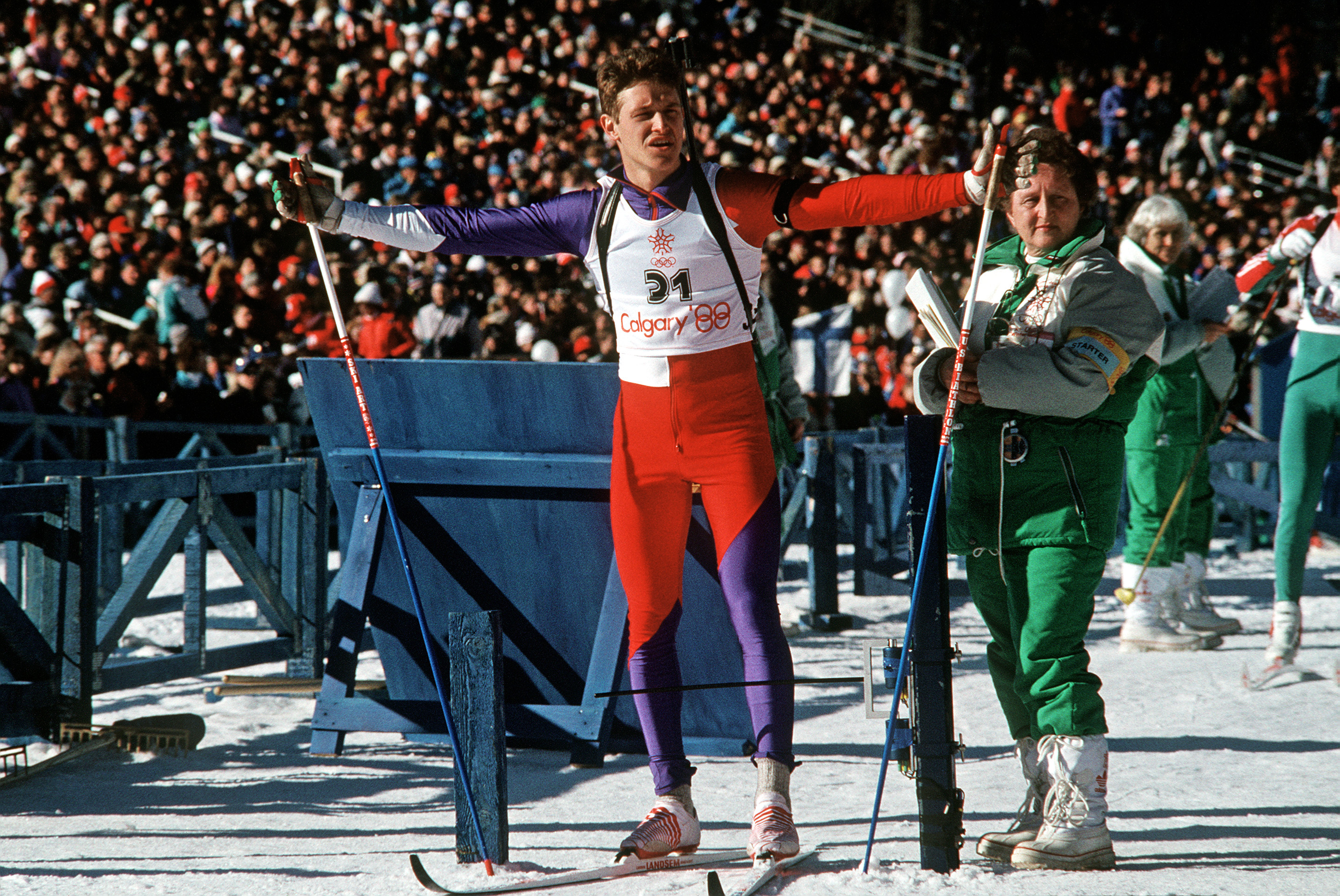
- Schreiner at the 1988 Winter Olympics

Personal information
- Born: March 9, 1967 (age 59) Albany, New York, U.S.
- Spouse: Deborah Nordyke

Sport
- Sport: Biathlon

Curt Schreiner (born March 9, 1967) is an American biathlete. He competed at the 1988 Winter Olympics, the 1992 Winter Olympics and the 1994 Winter Olympics.

Schreiner took an interest in biathlon after watching the 1980 Olympics. When he was a teenager, he and his family built a biathlon course on the family's 175-acre (71 ha) property in Day, New York.

Schreiner competed in canoeing, biathlon and cross-country skiing at the Empire State Games as well as the world junior canoe championships. He graduated as valedictorian of Hadley-Luzerne High School in Lake Luzerne, New York.

After high school, Schreiner commuted from home to Skidmore College so that he could to train on his home biathlon course. As Schreiner got more serious about his biathlon training, he was encouraged by fellow competitors to join the military and enlisted in the New York Army National Guard. Because his military service interrupted his time at Skidmore, he earned college credits at Northern Michigan University and later graduated from Excelsior College.

After failing to qualify for the 1998 and 2002 Winter Olympics, Schreiner quit biathlon and became certified in teaching. However, only weeks after completing his certification, he was called to active duty and deployed to serve in the Iraq War. After returning from Iraq, he completed his master's degree via a SUNY Plattsburgh campus in Queensbury, New York.

In 2007, he was diagnosed with multiple sclerosis.
