= Gottlieb Taschler =

Italian biathlete (b1961)

Personal information
- Full name: Gottlieb Taschler
- Born: 21 August 1961 (age 64) Antholz-Anterselva, Italy
- Height: 1.74 m (5 ft 9 in)

Sport

Professional information
- Sport: Biathlon
- Club: Sportverein Antholz; Fiamme Gialle

Olympic Games
- Teams: 3 (1984, 1988, 1992)
- Medals: 1 (0 gold)

World Championships
- Teams: 7 (1983, 1985, 1986, 1987, 1989, 1990, 1991)
- Medals: 2 (1 gold)

World Cup
- Seasons: 11 (1981/82–1991/92)
- Individual victories: 0
- Individual podiums: 1
Medal record
Men's biathlon
Representing Italy
Olympic Games
Bronze medal – third place	1988 Calgary	4 × 7.5 km relay
World Championships
Gold medal – first place	1991 Lahti	Team event
Bronze medal – third place	1986 Oslo Holmenkollen	4 × 7.5 km relay

Gottlieb Taschler (born 21 August 1961) is a former Italian biathlete. He competed at the 1984, 1988 and 1992 Winter Olympics. Currently he is a vice-president of the International Biathlon Union.

At the 1984 Winter Olympics in Sarajevo, he finished 5th in the 4 × 7.5 km relay with the Italian team. At the 1988 Winter Olympics in Calgary, he won a bronze medal in the relay, and finished 11th in the 20 km individual.

In 2010 he contacted doping doctor Michele Ferrari to set up a meeting with his son Daniel Taschler. Wiretaps show that his son then acquired EPO from Dr. Ferrari.

== Biathlon results ==
All results are sourced from the International Biathlon Union.

=== Olympic Games ===
1 medal (1 bronze)

Event	Individual	Sprint	Relay
(Socialist Federal Republic of Yugoslavia) 1984 Sarajevo	—	19th	5th
(Canada) 1988 Calgary	11th	—	Bronze
(France) 1992 Albertville	44th	—	—

=== World Championships ===
2 medals (1 gold, 1 bronze)

Event	Individual	Sprint	Team	Relay
(Italy) 1983 Antholz-Anterselva	18th	—	—N/a	10th
(West Germany) 1985 Ruhpolding	5th	—	—N/a	8th
(Norway) 1986 Oslo Holmenkollen	29th	6th	—N/a	Bronze
(United States) 1987 Lake Placid	18th	—	—N/a	8th
(Austria) 1989 Feistritz	23rd	16th	—	4th
(Soviet Union) 1990 Minsk	50th	—	9th	—
(Finland) 1991 Lahti	—	—	Gold	—

*During Olympic seasons competitions are only held for those events not included in the Olympic program.
**Team was added as an event in 1989.

Further notable results

- 1983: 3rd, Italian championships of biathlon
- 1986: 2nd, Italian championships of biathlon
- 1987: 3rd, Italian championships of biathlon
- 1988: 3rd, Italian championships of biathlon
