= Roger Westling =

Swedish biathlete (born 1961)

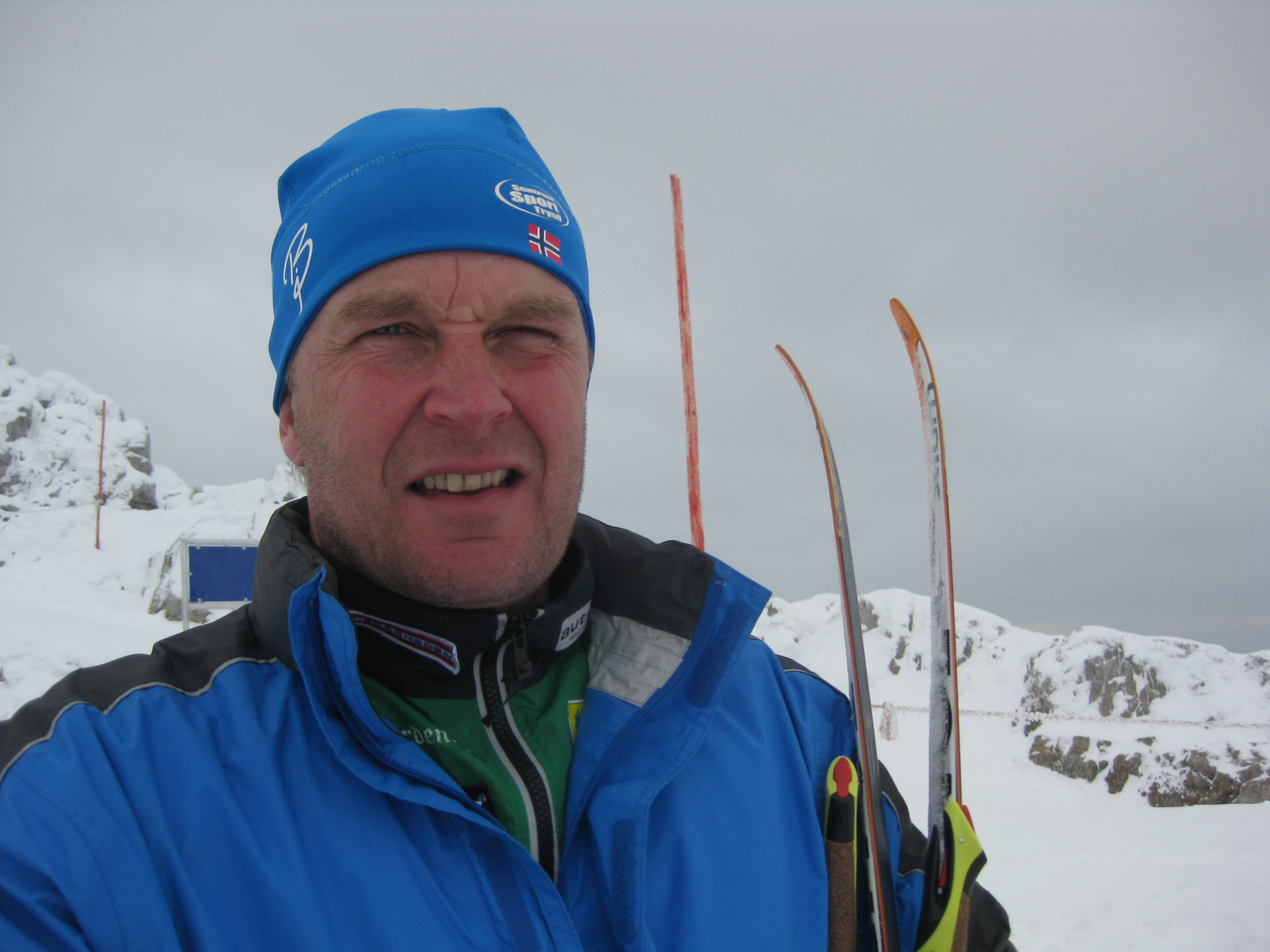
- Roger Westling in 2009

Personal information
- Nationality: Swedish
- Born: 17 December 1961 (age 64) Dalarna, Sweden

Sport
- Sport: Biathlon

Roger Westling (born 17 December 1961) is a Swedish biathlete. He competed at the 1984 Winter Olympics and the 1988 Winter Olympics.
