= Igor Cigolla =

Italian alpine skier (born 1963)

Igor Cigolla (born 17 August 1963 in Cavalese) is a former Italian alpine skier who competed in the 1988 Winter Olympics in Calgary and finished 31st in the downhill event.
