= Bruno Hofstätter =

Austrian biathlete (born 1963)

Personal information
- Nationality: Austrian
- Born: 14 May 1963 (age 62) Lienz, Austria

Sport
- Sport: Biathlon

Bruno Hofstätter (born 14 May 1963) is an Austrian biathlete. He competed at the 1988 Winter Olympics and the 1992 Winter Olympics.
