= Ken Karpoff =

Canadian biathlete (born 1956)

Ken Karpoff (born 14 January 1956) is a Canadian former biathlete who competed in the 1988 Winter Olympics.
