= Charles Plamondon =

Canadian biathlete (born 1961)

Charles Plamondon (born 4 May 1961) is a Canadian former biathlete who competed in the 1988 Winter Olympics.
