= Khristo Vodenicharov =

Bulgarian biathlete (born 1966)

Personal information
- Nationality: Bulgarian
- Born: 20 November 1966 (age 59)

Sport
- Sport: Biathlon

Khristo Vodenicharov (born 20 November 1966) is a Bulgarian biathlete. He competed at the 1988 Winter Olympics and the 1992 Winter Olympics.
