= Glenn Rupertus =

Canadian biathlete

Glenn Rupertus is a Canadian former biathlete who competed in the 1988 Winter Olympics, the 1992 Winter Olympics, and the 1994 Winter Olympics.

Glenn was born in Wetaskiwin, Alberta, on 26 July 1964.
