= France at the 1992 Winter Olympics =

- IOC code: FRA
- NOC: French National Olympic and Sports Committee

in Albertville
- Competitors: 109 (79 men, 30 women) in 12 sports
- Flag bearer: Fabrice Guy (Nordic Combined)
- Medals Ranked 7th: Gold 3 Silver 5 Bronze 1 Total 9

Winter Olympics appearances (overview)
- 1924; 1928; 1932; 1936; 1948; 1952; 1956; 1960; 1964; 1968; 1972; 1976; 1980; 1984; 1988; 1992; 1994; 1998; 2002; 2006; 2010; 2014; 2018; 2022; 2026

France was the host nation for the 1992 Winter Olympics in Albertville. It was the third time that France had hosted the Winter Olympic Games (after the 1924 Games in Chamonix and the 1968 Games in Grenoble), and the fifth time overall (after the 1900 and 1924 Summer Olympics, both in Paris).

== Medalists ==
Medal	Name	Sport	Event	Date
Gold	Fabrice Guy	Nordic combined	Individual	12 February
Gold	Edgar Grospiron	Freestyle skiing	Men's moguls	13 February
Gold	Corinne Niogret; Véronique Claudel; Anne Briand-Bouthiaux	Biathlon	Women's relay	14 February
Silver	Franck Piccard	Alpine skiing	Men's downhill	9 February
Silver	Sylvain Guillaume	Nordic combined	Individual	12 February
Silver	Olivier Allamand	Freestyle skiing	Men's moguls	13 February
Silver	Isabelle Duchesnay; Paul Duchesnay	Figure skating	Ice dance	17 February
Silver	Carole Merle	Alpine skiing	Women's super-G	18 February
Bronze	Florence Masnada	Alpine skiing	Women's combined	13 February

== Competitors ==
The following is the list of number of competitors in the Games.

Sport	Men	Women	Total
Alpine skiing	10	9	19
Biathlon	6	4	10
Bobsleigh	9	–	9
Cross-country skiing	6	5	11
Figure skating	6	6	12
Freestyle skiing	4	2	6
Ice hockey	22	–	22
Luge	3	0	3
Nordic combined	4	–	4
Short track speed skating	4	4	8
Ski jumping	4	–	4
Speed skating	1	0	1
Total	79	30	109

== Alpine skiing ==
Men

Athlete	Event	Race 1	Race 2	Total	
Athlete	Event	Time	Time	Time	Rank
Adrien Duvillard	Downhill			DNF	–
Denis Rey	Downhill			1:54.28	27
Luc Alphand	Downhill			1:52.34	12
Franck Piccard	Downhill			1:50.42	2nd place, silver medalist(s)
Armand Schiele	Super-G			DNF	–
Franck Piccard	Super-G			DNF	–
Jean-Luc Crétier	Super-G			1:16.36	24
Luc Alphand	Super-G			1:15.39	16
Franck Piccard	Giant Slalom	1:07.14	1:04.79	2:11.93	18
Alain Feutrier	Giant Slalom	1:07.11	1:04.89	2:12.00	19
Stéphane Exartier	Giant Slalom	1:06.87	1:03.80	2:10.67	13
Patrice Bianchi	Slalom	DNF	–	DNF	–
Stéphane Exartier	Slalom	58.31	55.59	1:53.90	30
Alain Feutrier	Slalom	54.50	DNF	DNF	–
François Simond	Slalom	53.88	53.61	1:47.49	12

Men's combined

Athlete	Downhill	Slalom		Total	
Athlete	Time	Time 1	Time 2	Points	Rank
Adrien Duvillard	DSQ	–	–	DSQ	–
Denis Rey	DSQ	–	–	DSQ	–
Jean-Luc Crétier	1:46.25	49.67	52.42	18.97	4

Women

Athlete	Event	Race 1	Race 2	Total	
Athlete	Event	Time	Time	Time	Rank
Marie-Pierre Gatel	Downhill			1:56.25	23
Cathy Chedal	Downhill			1:55.91	22
Régine Cavagnoud	Downhill			1:54.94	17
Carole Merle	Downhill			1:54.73	13
Régine Cavagnoud	Super-G			1:26.69	26
Cathy Chedal	Super-G			1:25.66	22
Florence Masnada	Super-G			1:25.42	19
Carole Merle	Super-G			1:22.63	2nd place, silver medalist(s)
Cathy Chedal	Giant Slalom	DSQ	–	DSQ	–
Sophie Lefranc	Giant Slalom	1:09.54	1:09.13	2:18.67	19
Christelle Guignard	Giant Slalom	1:08.08	DNF	DNF	–
Carole Merle	Giant Slalom	1:06.67	1:07.57	2:14.24	6
Béatrice Filliol	Slalom	DNF	–	DNF	–
Florence Masnada	Slalom	DNF	–	DNF	–
Christelle Guignard	Slalom	50.20	46.11	1:36.31	14
Patricia Chauvet-Blanc	Slalom	48.98	44.74	1:33.72	6

Women's combined

Athlete	Downhill	Slalom		Total	
Athlete	Time	Time 1	Time 2	Points	Rank
Béatrice Filliol	1:30.03	34.23	DNF	DNF	–
Régine Cavagnoud	1:28.16	35.96	36.03	51.13	10
Florence Masnada	1:27.08	35.19	34.82	21.38	3rd place, bronze medalist(s)

== Biathlon ==
Men

Event	Athlete	Misses ^{1}	Time	Rank
10 km Sprint	Xavier Blond	3	28:32.8	45
10 km Sprint	Christian Dumont	4	28:30.7	42
10 km Sprint	Patrice Bailly-Salins	3	27:49.7	30
10 km Sprint	Hervé Flandin	1	26:56.6	10

Event	Athlete	Time	Misses	Adjusted time ^{2}	Rank
20 km	Lionel Laurent	59:10.6	4	1'03:10.6	47
20 km	Thierry Gerbier	1'00:24.8	2	1'02:24.8	39
20 km	Patrice Bailly-Salins	56:28.3	4	1'00:28.3	22
20 km	Christian Dumont	57:27.0	2	59:27.0	13

Men's 4 x 7.5 km relay

Athletes	Race		
Athletes	Misses ^{1}	Time	Rank
Xavier Blond; Thierry Gerbier; Christian Dumont; Hervé Flandin	0	1'27:13.3	6

Women

Event	Athlete	Misses ^{1}	Time	Rank
7.5 km Sprint	Véronique Claudel	4	27:04.5	24
7.5 km Sprint	Corinne Niogret	3	26:32.3	17
7.5 km Sprint	Delphyne Heymann-Burlet	4	25:50.5	9
7.5 km Sprint	Anne Briand-Schaaf	2	25:29.8	7

Event	Athlete	Time	Misses	Adjusted time ^{2}	Rank
15 km	Anne Briand-Bouthiaux	49:05.1	7	56:05.1	19
15 km	Corinne Niogret	51:06.6	2	53:06.6	7
15 km	Delphyne Heymann-Burlet	50:00.8	3	53:00.8	6
15 km	Véronique Claudel	50:21.2	2	52:21.2	4

Women's 3 x 7.5 km relay

Athletes	Race		
Athletes	Misses ^{1}	Time	Rank
Corinne Niogret; Véronique Claudel; Anne Briand-Bouthiaux	0	1'15:55.6	1st place, gold medalist(s)

^{1} A penalty loop of 150 metres had to be skied per missed target.
^{2} One minute added per missed target.

== Bobsleigh ==
Sled	Athletes	Event	Run 1		Run 2		Run 3		Run 4		Total	
Sled	Athletes	Event	Time	Rank	Time	Rank	Time	Rank	Time	Rank	Time	Rank
FRA-1	Christophe Flacher; Claude Dasse	Two-man	1:01.13	16	1:01.52	15	1:01.47	11	1:01.44	12	4:05.56	14
FRA-2	Gabriel Fourmigué; Philippe Tanchon	Two-man	1:01.19	18	1:01.72	19	1:01.77	16	1:01.70	14	4:06.38	17

Sled	Athletes	Event	Run 1		Run 2		Run 3		Run 4		Total	
Sled	Athletes	Event	Time	Rank	Time	Rank	Time	Rank	Time	Rank	Time	Rank
FRA-1	Christophe Flacher; Claude Dasse; Thierry Tribondeau; Gabriel Fourmigué	Four-man	58.45	7	58.79	7	58.78	11	58.89	8	3:54.91	8
FRA-2	Bruno Mingeon; Stéphane Poirot; Didier Stil; Dominique Klinnik	Four-man	59.03	17	59.33	19	59.52	20	59.53	20	3:57.41	18

== Cross-country skiing ==
Men

Event	Athlete	Race	
Event	Athlete	Time	Rank
10 km C	Cédric Vallet	34:35.1	79
10 km C	Philippe Sanchez	31:42.3	51
10 km C	Stéphane Azambre	31:22.2	43
10 km C	Patrick Rémy	30:45.1	36
15 km pursuit^{1} F	Cédric Vallet	48:10.2	68
15 km pursuit^{1} F	Stéphane Azambre	43:26.9	38
15 km pursuit^{1} F	Philippe Sanchez	42:34.3	30
15 km pursuit^{1} F	Patrick Rémy	42:08.5	22
30 km C	Guy Balland	1'30:19.6	37
30 km C	Patrick Rémy	1'27:54.0	23
50 km F	Stéphane Azambre	2'13:49.8	26
50 km F	Guy Balland	2'10:40.8	14
50 km F	Hervé Balland	2'07:17.7	5

^{1} Starting delay based on 10 km results.
C = Classical style, F = Freestyle

Men's 4 × 10 km relay

Athletes	Race	
Athletes	Time	Rank
Patrick Rémy; Philippe Sanchez; Stéphane Azambre; Hervé Balland	1'44:51.1	8

Women

Event	Athlete	Race	
Event	Athlete	Time	Rank
5 km C	Sophie Villeneuve	16:15.0	49
5 km C	Sylvie Giry-Rousset	16:06.6	45
5 km C	Marie-Pierre Guilbaud	15:53.6	37
5 km C	Isabelle Mancini	15:12.1	22
10 km pursuit^{2} F	Marie-Pierre Guilbaud	31:41.3	46
10 km pursuit^{2} F	Sylvie Giry-Rousset	29:46.3	32
10 km pursuit^{2} F	Sophie Villeneuve	29:28.5	31
10 km pursuit^{2} F	Isabelle Mancini	27:39.3	9
15 km C	Carole Stanisière	47:20.1	32
15 km C	Sylvie Giry-Rousset	46:48.5	28
30 km F	Marie-Pierre Guilbaud	DNF	–
30 km F	Sylvie Giry-Rousset	1'35:08.4	39
30 km F	Isabelle Mancini	1'31:03.3	21
30 km F	Sophie Villeneuve	1'30:14.5	18

^{2} Starting delay based on 5 km results.
C = Classical style, F = Freestyle

Women's 4 × 5 km relay

Athletes	Race	
Athletes	Time	Rank
Carole Stanisière; Sylvie Giry-Rousset; Sophie Villeneuve; Isabelle Mancini	1'01:30.7	5

== Curling ==
Curling was a demonstration sport at the 1992 Winter Olympics.

France
Megève CC, Megève

Skip: Dominique Dupont-Roc
Third: Claude Feige
Second: Patrick Philippe
Lead: Thierry Mercier
Alternate: Daniel Moratelli

== Figure skating ==
Men

Athlete	SP	FS	TFP	Rank
Éric Millot	17	13	21.5	15
Nicolas Pétorin	14	14	21.0	14

Women

Athlete	SP	FS	TFP	Rank
Laëtitia Hubert	5	15	17.5	12
Surya Bonaly	3	6	7.5	5

Pairs

Athletes	SP	FS	TFP	Rank
Line Haddad; Sylvain Prive	16	16	24.0	16

Ice Dancing

Athletes	CD1	CD2	OD	FD	TFP	Rank
Sophie Moniotte; Pascal Lavanchy	9	9	8	9	17.4	9
Doninique Yvon; Frédéric Palluel	8	8	9	8	16.6	8
Isabelle Duchesnay; Paul Duchesnay	3	3	2	2	4.4	2nd place, silver medalist(s)

== Freestyle skiing ==
Men

Athlete	Event	Qualification			Final		
Athlete	Event	Time	Points	Rank	Time	Points	Rank
Éric Berthon	Moguls	33.26	23.41	8 Q	33.87	24.79	4
Youri Gilg	Moguls	33.39	23.63	5 Q	33.20	22.85	9
Olivier Allamand	Moguls	31.85	24.96	2 Q	32.91	24.87	2nd place, silver medalist(s)
Edgar Grospiron	Moguls	31.80	25.23	1 Q	31.23	25.81	1st place, gold medalist(s)

Women

Athlete	Event	Qualification			Final		
Athlete	Event	Time	Points	Rank	Time	Points	Rank
Candice Gilg	Moguls	54.94	8.74	24	did not advance		
Raphaëlle Monod	Moguls	38.78	24.09	1 Q	43.72	15.57	8

== Ice hockey ==
=== Group B ===
Twelve participating teams were placed in two groups. After playing a round-robin, the top four teams in each group advanced to the Medal Round while the last two teams competed in the consolation round for the 9th to 12th places.

Team advanced to the Final Round
Team sent to compete in the Consolation round

Team	GP	W	L	T	GF	GA	DIF	PTS
Canada	5	4	1	0	28	9	19	8
Unified Team	5	4	1	0	32	10	22	8
Czechoslovakia	5	4	1	0	25	15	10	8
France	5	2	3	0	14	22	-8	4
Switzerland	5	1	4	0	13	25	-12	2
Norway	5	0	5	0	7	38	-31	0

France	2:3	Canada
France	4:6	Czechoslovakia
France	4:3	Switzerland
France	0:8	Unified Team
France	4:2	Norway

=== Final round ===
Quarter-finals

France	1:4	United States

Consolation round 5th-8th places

France	4:5	Germany

7th-place match

France 8th	1:4	Finland

Contestants

- Jean-Marc Djian
- Fabrice Lhenry
- Petri Ylönen
- Stéphane Botteri
- Gérald Guennelon
- Michel Leblanc
- Jean-Philippe Lemoine
- Denis Perez
- Serge Poudrier
- Bruno Saunier
- Peter Almásy
- Mickaël Babin
- Stéphane Barin
- Philippe Bozon
- Arnaud Briand
- Yves Crettenand
- Patrick Dunn
- Benoît Laporte
- Pascal Margerit
- Christian Pouget
- Pierre Pousse
- Antoine Richer
- Christophe Ville

- Head coach: Kjell Larsson

== Luge ==
Men

Athlete	Run 1		Run 2		Run 3		Run 4		Total	
Athlete	Time	Rank	Time	Rank	Time	Rank	Time	Rank	Time	Rank
Frédéric Bertrand	47.663	30	47.800	32	48.443	31	49.050	32	3:12.956	32
Yves Boyer	47.378	29	46.917	26	47.891	28	47.644	27	3:09.830	28
Olivier Fraise	46.287	21	47.278	30	46.981	22	46.814	20	3:07.360	22

(Men's) Doubles

Athletes	Run 1		Run 2		Total	
Athletes	Time	Rank	Time	Rank	Time	Rank
Yves Boyer; Frédéric Bertrand	48.847	20	48.060	19	1:36.907	19

== Nordic combined ==
Men's individual

Events:

- normal hill ski jumping (Best two out of three jumps.)
- 15 km cross-country skiing (Start delay, based on ski jumping results.)

Athlete	Event	Ski Jumping		Cross-country		Total
Athlete	Event	Points	Rank	Start at	Time	Rank
Xavier Girard	Individual	199.3	22	+3:14.7	48:02.0	13
Francis Repellin	Individual	201.9	19	+2:57.4	50:28.4	27
Sylvain Guillaume	Individual	208.1	13	+2:16.0	45:16.5	2nd place, silver medalist(s)
Fabrice Guy	Individual	222.1	3	+42.7	44:28.1	1st place, gold medalist(s)

Men's Team

Three participants per team.

Events:

- normal hill ski jumping (Best two out of three jumps per team member were counted.)
- 10 km cross-country skiing (Start delay, based on ski jumping results.)

Athletes	Ski jumping		Cross-country		Total
Athletes	Points	Rank	Start at	Time	Rank
Francis Repellin; Sylvain Guillaume; Fabrice Guy	578.4	5	+5:33.0	1'25:52.0	4

== Short track speed skating ==
Men

Athlete	Event	Round one		Quarter finals		Semi finals		Finals	
Athlete	Event	Time	Rank	Time	Rank	Time	Rank	Time	Final rank
Marc Bella	1000 m	1:34.22	3	did not advance					
Marc Bella; Arnaud Drouet; Rémi Ingres; Claude Nicouleau	5000 m relay			7:38.32	3 q	7:26.09	3 QB	7:26.09	5

Women

Athlete	Event	Round one		Quarter finals		Semi finals		Finals	
Athlete	Event	Time	Rank	Time	Rank	Time	Rank	Time	Final rank
Karine Rubini	500 m	49.25	2 Q	1:08.41	4	did not advance			
Valérie Barizza; Sandrine Daudet; Murielle Leyssieux; Karine Rubini	3000 m relay					4:43.32	3	did not advance	

== Ski jumping ==
Athlete	Event	Jump 1		Jump 2		Total	
Athlete	Event	Distance	Points	Distance	Points	Points	Rank
Jérôme Gay	Normal hill	79.5	88.7	79.5	92.2	180.9	43
Steve Delaup	Normal hill	78.5	92.1	79.5	94.7	186.8	32
Nicolas Jean-Prost	Normal hill	81.0	97.6	81.0	98.1	195.7	19
Didier Mollard	Normal hill	84.5	103.7	85.0	106.0	209.7	8
Jérôme Gay	Large hill	70.0	17.0	97.5	76.5	93.5	54
Nicolas Jean-Prost	Large hill	92.5	69.5	78.0	35.2	104.7	51
Didier Mollard	Large hill	104.5	89.8	81.0	42.4	132.2	40
Steve Delaup	Large hill	106.0	92.9	105.5	92.7	185.6	6

Men's team large hill

Athletes	Result	
Athletes	Points ^{1}	Rank
Jérôme Gay; Didier Mollard; Nicolas Jean-Prost; Steve Delaup	510.9	10

^{1} Four teams members performed two jumps each. The best three were counted.

== Speed skating ==
Men

Event	Athlete	Race	
Event	Athlete	Time	Rank
1000 m	Thierry Lamberton	1:31.64	44
1500 m	Thierry Lamberton	2:04.04	41
5000 m	Thierry Lamberton	7:35.51	35
