= France at the 1994 Winter Olympics =

- IOC code: FRA
- NOC: French National Olympic and Sports Committee
- Website: www.franceolympique.com (in French)

in Lillehammer
- Competitors: 98 (68 men, 30 women) in 10 sports
- Flag bearer: Anne Briand (biathlon)
- Medals Ranked 17th: Gold 0 Silver 1 Bronze 4 Total 5

Winter Olympics appearances (overview)
- 1924; 1928; 1932; 1936; 1948; 1952; 1956; 1960; 1964; 1968; 1972; 1976; 1980; 1984; 1988; 1992; 1994; 1998; 2002; 2006; 2010; 2014; 2018; 2022; 2026

France competed at the 1994 Winter Olympics in Lillehammer, Norway.

== Medalists ==
Medal	Name	Sport	Event	Date
Silver	Anne Briand	Biathlon	Women's individual	18 February
Bronze	Thierry Dusserre; Patrice Bailly-Salins; Lionel Laurent; Hervé Flandin	Biathlon	Men's relay	15 February
Bronze	Edgar Grospiron	Freestyle skiing	Men's moguls	16 February
Bronze	Philippe Candeloro	Figure skating	Men's singles	19 February
Bronze	Corinne Niogret; Véronique Claudel; Delphyne Burlet; Anne Briand	Biathlon	Women's relay	25 February

== Competitors ==
The following is the list of number of competitors in the Games.

Sport	Men	Women	Total
Alpine skiing	8	9	17
Biathlon	6	5	11
Bobsleigh	8	–	8
Cross-country skiing	5	5	10
Figure skating	4	5	9
Freestyle skiing	6	2	8
Ice hockey	22	–	22
Nordic combined	4	–	4
Short track speed skating	1	4	5
Ski jumping	4	–	4
Total	68	30	98

== Alpine skiing ==
Men

Athlete	Event	Final				
Athlete	Event	Run 1	Run 2	Run 3	Total	Rank
Luc Alphand	Downhill				1:46.25	8
Luc Alphand	Super-G				1:33.39	8
Sébastien Amiez	Slalom	1:03.66	DNF		DNF	
Nicolas Burtin	Downhill				1:46.22	6
Nicolas Burtin	Super-G				1:35.28	31
Jean-Luc Crétier	Downhill				1:47.27	24
Jean-Luc Crétier	Combined	1:38.92	DQ		DQ	
Yves Dimier	Slalom	1:03.72	1:03.27		2:06.99	16
Franck Piccard	Super-G				1:34.75	23
Franck Piccard	Giant Slalom	1:29.79	1:24.18		2:53.97	13
Ian Piccard	Giant Slalom	1:30.21	1:24.64		2:54.85	17
Christophe Plé	Downhill				1:47.11	22
Christophe Plé	Super-G				1:34.50	17

Women

Athlete	Event	Final				
Athlete	Event	Run 1	Run 2	Run 3	Total	Rank
Nathalie Bouvier	Downhill				1:38.85	29
Régine Cavagnoud	Downhill				1:38.69	26
Régine Cavagnoud	Super-G				1:23.13	11
Régine Cavagnoud	Giant Slalom	1:23.45	1:13.33		2:36.78	18
Patricia Chauvet-Blanc	Slalom	DNF			DNF	
Béatrice Filliol	Slalom	DNF			DNF	
Sophie Lefranc	Giant Slalom	DNF			DNF	
Florence Masnada	Downhill				1:37.92	13
Florence Masnada	Super-G				1:23.43	14
Florence Masnada	Slalom	DNF			DNF	
Florence Masnada	Combined	1:29.11	51.86	49.05	3:10.02	7
Carole Merle	Super-G				1:23.72	19
Carole Merle	Giant Slalom	1:21.56	1:11.88		2:33.44	5
Leila Piccard	Giant Slalom	1:24.58	DNF		DNF	
Leila Piccard	Slalom	1:01.33	DNF		DNF	
Mélanie Suchet	Downhill				1:37.34	6
Mélanie Suchet	Super-G				1:23.74	20

== Biathlon ==
Men

Athlete	Event	Final		
Athlete	Event	Time	Pen.	Rank
Patrice Bailly-Salins	10 km Sprint	29:43.1	2	11
Patrice Bailly-Salins	20 km Individual	59:53.5	4	13
Stéphane Bouthiaux	10 km Sprint	31:07.3	3	35
Thierry Dusserre	10 km Sprint	30:22.6	2	19
Hervé Flandin	10 km Sprint	29:33.8	1	8
Hervé Flandin	20 km Individual	1:02:25.9	4	44
Lionel Laurent	20 km Individual	1:01:42.6	3	32
Franck Perrot	20 km Individual	1:02:57.0	3	47
Thierry Dusserre; Patrice Bailly-Salins; Lionel Laurent; Hervé Flandin	4 × 7.5 kilometres relay	1:32:31.3	1	3rd place, bronze medalist(s)

Women

Athlete	Event	Final		
Athlete	Event	Time	Pen.	Rank
Anne Briand	7.5 km Sprint	28:00.8	4	30
Anne Briand	15 km Individual	52:53.3	3	2nd place, silver medalist(s)
Emmanuelle Claret	7.5 km Sprint	28:19.7	5	35
Véronique Claudel	7.5 km Sprint	27:28.2	1	20
Véronique Claudel	15 km Individual	55:40.6	2	20
Delphyne Burlet	15 km Individual	54:21.8	1	11
Corinne Niogret	7.5 km Sprint	27:48.1	3	27
Corinne Niogret	15 km Individual	53:38.1	2	5
Corinne Niogret; Véronique Claudel; Delphyne Burlet; Anne Briand	4× 7.5 km Relay	1:52:28.3	1	3rd place, bronze medalist(s)

== Bobsleigh ==
Athlete	Event	Final					
Athlete	Event	Run 1	Run 2	Run 3	Run 4	Total	Rank
Christophe Flacher; Max Robert	Two-man	53.44	53.60	53.47	53.79	3:34.30	21
Gabriel Fourmigué; Philippe Tanchon	Two-man	53.54	53.70	53.58	53.98	3:34.80	23
Christophe Flacher; Thierry Tribondeau; Claude Dasse; Max Robert	Four-man	52.54	52.61	52.89	53.14	3:31.18	21
Bruno Mingeon; Philippe Tanchon; Gabriel Fourmigué; Éric Le Chanony	Four-man	52.43	52.49	52.54	52.58	3:30.04	16

== Cross-country skiing ==
Men

Athlete	Event	Final					
Athlete	Event	Start	Rank	Time	Rank	Total	Rank
Stéphane Azambre	10 km Classical					27:14.6	54
Hervé Balland	30 km Free					DNF	
Patrick Rémy	10 km Classical					25:57.6	22
Patrick Rémy	15 km Free Pursuit	+01:37	22	38:23.5	26	+4:11.7	20
Patrick Rémy	50 km Classical					2:16:21.4	23
Philippe Sanchez	10 km Classical					26:47.8	39
Philippe Sanchez	15 km Free Pursuit	+02:27	39	38:44.8	35	+5:23.0	29
Philippe Sanchez	50 km Classical					2:22:01.0	46
Cédric Vallet	10 km Classical					27:30.0	63
Cédric Vallet	15 km Free Pursuit	+03:10	63	40:14.5	54	+7:35.7	53
Cédric Vallet	30 km Free					1:19:49.7	32
Cédric Vallet	50 km Classical					2:19:06.7	33
Philippe Sanchez; Patrick Remy; Hervé Balland; Stéphane Azambre	4 × 10 km Relay					1:48:25.1	10

Women

Athlete	Event	Final					
Athlete	Event	Start	Rank	Time	Rank	Total	Rank
Sylvie Giry-Rousset	15 km Free					DNF	
Sylvie Giry-Rousset	30 km Classical					1:39:26.3	50
Isabelle Mancini	5 km Classical					16:31.4	51
Isabelle Mancini	10 km Free Pursuit	+02:23	51	29:49.8	25	+4:42.7	30
Isabelle Mancini	15 km Free					46:16.2	39
Carole Stanisière	5 km Classical					16:08.7	41
Carole Stanisière	10 km Free Pursuit	+02:00	41	32:02.4	49	+6:32.3	47
Carole Stanisière	30 km Classical					1:32:17.6	24
Élisabeth Tardy	5 km Classical					16:39.3	54
Élisabeth Tardy	10 km Free Pursuit	+02:31	54	30:58.9	36	+5:59.8	41
Sophie Villeneuve	5 km Classical					15:31.9	23
Sophie Villeneuve	10 km Free Pursuit	+01:23	23	28:05.8	8	+1:58.7	10
Sophie Villeneuve	15 km Free					42:41.3	9
Carole Stanisière; Sylvie Giry-Rousset; Sophie Villeneuve; Élisabeth Tardy	4 × 10 km Relay					1:02:28.6	11

== Figure skating ==
Men

Athlete	Final				
Athlete	Short Program	Rank	Free Skating	Total	Rank
Philippe Candeloro	1.5	3	5.0	6.5	3rd place, bronze medalist(s)
Éric Millot	3.0	6	7.0	10.0	7

Women

Athlete	Final				
Athlete	Short Program	Rank	Free Skating	Total	Rank
Surya Bonaly	1.5	3	4.0	5.5	4
Laëtitia Hubert	10.0	20	15.0	25.0	17
Marie-Pierre Leray	7.0	14	13.0	20.0	14

Ice Dancing

Athlete	Final								
Athlete	Compulsory Dance 1	Rank	Compulsory Dance 2	Rank	Original Dance	Rank	Free Dance	Total	Rank
Sophie Moniotte; Pascal Lavanchy	1.0	5	1.0	5	3.0	5	5.0	10.0	5
Bérangère Nau; Luc Moneger	3.0	15	3.0	15	9.0	15	14.0	27.0	14

== Freestyle skiing ==
Men

Athlete	Event	Qualifying		Final	
Athlete	Event	Points	Rank	Points	Rank
Olivier Allamand	Moguls	25.89	5 Q	25.28	6
Jean-Marc Bacquin	Aerials	203.58	8 Q	196.88	9
Alexis Blanc	Aerials	162.22	18	Did Not Advance	
Olivier Cotte	Moguls	26.36	4 Q	25.79	4
Sébastien Foucras	Aerials	55.68	24	Did Not Advance	
Edgar Grospiron	Moguls	26.65	2 Q	26.64	3rd place, bronze medalist(s)

Women

Athlete	Event	Qualifying		Final	
Athlete	Event	Points	Rank	Points	Rank
Candice Gilg	Moguls	24.12	5 Q	24.82	5
Raphaëlle Monod	Moguls	24.16	4 Q	25.17	4

== Ice hockey ==
=== Men's team competition ===
- Team roster
  - Michel Valliere
  - Petri Ylönen
  - Stéphane Botteri
  - Gérald Guennelon
  - Christophe Moyon
  - Denis Perez
  - Serge Poudrier
  - Bruno Saunier
  - Steven Woodburn
  - Benjamin Agnel
  - Stéphane Arcangeloni
  - Stéphane Barin
  - Arnaud Briand
  - Sylvain Girard
  - Benoît Laporte
  - Eric LeMarque
  - Pierrick Maia
  - Franck Pajonkowski
  - Pierre Pousse
  - Antoine Richer
  - Franck Saunier
  - Christophe Ville
- Head coach: Kjell Larsson

Results

Stage	Opponent	Result	Points	Rank
Group Stage	United States	4-4		
Group Stage	Canada	1-3		
Group Stage	Sweden	1-7		
Group Stage	Italy	3-7		
Group Stage	Slovakia	2-6		
Group Stage		11-27	1	6
Placement Round 9-12	Austria	5-4		
9th Place Match	Italy	2-3		10

== Nordic combined ==
Athlete	Event	First Round		Second Round			Cross-country				
Athlete	Event	Points	Rank	Points	Total	Rank	Start	Time	Rank	Total	Rank
Étienne Gouy	Individual event	98.5	28	93.5	192.0	28	+06:06	41:08.5	30	47:14.5	28
Sylvain Guillaume	Individual event	97.5	30	104.5	202.0	16	+05:00	38:18.4	2	43:18.4	9
Fabrice Guy	Individual event	105.0	12	86.0	191.0	31	+06:13	39:07.2	7	45:20.2	17
Stéphane Michon	Individual event	88.5	42	82.5	171.0	41	+08:26	39:00.1	6	47:26.1	34
Stéphane Michon; Fabrice Guy; Sylvain Guillaume	Team event	291.5	9	266.0	557.5	10	+14:40	1:20:53.0	1	1:35:33.0	6

== Short track speed skating ==
Men

Athlete	Event	Heats		Quarterfinals		Semifinals		Final	
Athlete	Event	Time	Rank	Time	Rank	Time	Rank	Time	Rank
Bruno Loscos	500 metres	45.54	3rd	Ranking Round					21st
Bruno Loscos	1000 metres	1:33.93	4th	Ranking Round					26th

Women

Athlete	Event	Heats		Quarterfinals		Semifinals		Final	
Athlete	Event	Time	Rank	Time	Rank	Time	Rank	Time	Rank
Valérie Barizza	500 metres	50.30	4th	Ranking Round					28th
Valérie Barizza	1000 metres	1:52.30	4th	Ranking Round					27th
Sandrine Daudet	500 metres	49.06	2nd	47.97	3rd	Ranking Round			13th
Sandrine Daudet	1000 metres	1:41.91	2nd	1:40.83	4th	Ranking Round			16th
Laure Drouet	500 metres	50.47	3rd	Ranking Round					22nd
Laure Drouet	1000 metres	1:41.21	4th	Ranking Round					25th
Valérie Barizza; Sandrine Daudet; Sandra Deleglise; Laure Drouet	3000 metres relay					4:55.24	4th	4:59.94	7th

== Ski jumping ==
Athlete	Event	First Round		Final		
Athlete	Event	Points	Rank	Points	Total	Rank
Steve Delaup	Large hill	85.3	27	84.9	170.2	23
Steve Delaup	Normal hill	73.0	56	89.5	162.5	47
Nicolas Dessum	Large hill	92.8	20	78.2	171.0	21
Nicolas Dessum	Normal hill	123.5	11	109.5	233.0	14
Nicolas Jean-Prost	Large hill	26.4	54	70.7	97.1	47
Nicolas Jean-Prost	Normal hill	111.0	28	113.5	224.5	22
Didier Mollard	Large hill	117.7	7	95.6	213.3	10
Didier Mollard	Normal hill	115.5	20	114.5	230.0	17
Nicolas Jean-Prost; Steve Delaup; Nicolas Dessum; Didier Mollard	Team Large Hill	414.7	6	407.4	822.1	6
