= France at the 1988 Winter Olympics =

- IOC code: FRA
- NOC: French National Olympic and Sports Committee

in Calgary
- Competitors: 68 (53 men, 15 women) in 9 sports
- Flag bearer: Catherine Quittet (Alpine Skiing)
- Medals Ranked 11th: Gold 1 Silver 0 Bronze 1 Total 2

Winter Olympics appearances (overview)
- 1924; 1928; 1932; 1936; 1948; 1952; 1956; 1960; 1964; 1968; 1972; 1976; 1980; 1984; 1988; 1992; 1994; 1998; 2002; 2006; 2010; 2014; 2018; 2022; 2026

France competed at the 1988 Winter Olympics in Calgary, Alberta, Canada. Frank Piccard won France's first Winter Olympic gold medal for 20 years.

As Albertville would be hosting the following Winter Olympics, a French segment was performed at the closing ceremony.

== Medalists ==
Medal	Name	Sport	Event	Date
Gold	Franck Piccard	Alpine skiing	Men's super-G	21 February
Bronze	Franck Piccard	Alpine skiing	Men's downhill	15 February

== Competitors ==
The following is the list of number of competitors in the Games.

Sport	Men	Women	Total
Alpine skiing	9	8	17
Biathlon	7	–	7
Cross-country skiing	5	0	5
Figure skating	3	3	6
Ice hockey	22	–	22
Luge	0	1	1
Nordic combined	4	–	4
Ski jumping	2	–	2
Speed skating	2	2	4
Total	54	14	68

== Alpine skiing ==
Men

Athlete	Event	Race 1	Race 2	Total	
Athlete	Event	Time	Time	Time	Rank
Philippe Verneret	Downhill			DSQ	–
Luc Alphand	Downhill			DNF	–
Christophe Plé	Downhill			2:04.78	25
Franck Piccard	Downhill			2:01.24	3rd place, bronze medalist(s)
Philippe Verneret	Super-G			DNF	–
Yves Tavernier	Super-G			1:44.88	20
Luc Alphand	Super-G			1:42.27	7
Franck Piccard	Super-G			1:39.66	1st place, gold medalist(s)
Alain Feutrier	Giant Slalom	DNF	–	DNF	–
Christian Gaidet	Giant Slalom	1:07.59	1:04.08	2:11.67	18
Yves Tavernier	Giant Slalom	1:07.44	1:04.77	2:12.21	24
Jean-Luc Crétier	Slalom	DSQ	–	DSQ	–
Yves Tavernier	Slalom	55.39	DNF	DNF	–
Christian Gaidet	Slalom	54.23	DNF	DNF	–
Didier Bouvet	Slalom	53.34	DNF	DNF	–

Men's combined

Athlete	Downhill	Slalom		Total	
Athlete	Time	Time 1	Time 2	Points	Rank
Jean-Luc Crétier	1:50.04	44.62	43.90	62.98	6
Luc Alphand	1:49.60	45.27	43.20	57.73	4
Christophe Plé	1:49.06	47.68	47.30	103.12	12
Franck Piccard	1:47.38	DNF	–	DNF	–

Women

Athlete	Event	Race 1	Race 2	Total	
Athlete	Event	Time	Time	Time	Rank
Claudine Emonet	Downhill			1:28.36	17
Carole Merle	Downhill			1:27.53	12
Cathy Chedal	Super-G			DNF	–
Claudine Emonet	Super-G			1:22.05	22
Catherine Quittet	Super-G			1:21.48	16
Carole Merle	Super-G			1:21.01	12
Małgorzata Tłalka-Mogore	Giant Slalom	1:03.01	1:11.38	2:14.39	19
Carole Merle	Giant Slalom	1:01.30	1:08.06	2:09.36	9
Catherine Quittet	Giant Slalom	1:01.11	1:07.73	2:08.84	8
Christelle Guignard	Giant Slalom	1:00.90	1:08.56	2:09.46	10
Christelle Guignard	Slalom	DNF	–	DNF	–
Patricia Chauvet-Blanc	Slalom	51.48	51.31	1:42.79	14
Pascaline Freiher	Slalom	51.37	DNF	DNF	–
Dorota Tłalka-Mogore	Slalom	50.28	49.58	1:39.86	8

Women's combined

Athlete	Downhill	Slalom		Total	
Athlete	Time	Time 1	Time 2	Points	Rank
Claudine Emonet	DNF	–	–	DNF	–
Pascaline Freiher	1:24.18	42.16	42.50	151.93	22
Carole Merle	1:16.46	DSQ	–	DSQ	–

== Biathlon ==
Men

Event	Athlete	Misses ^{1}	Time	Rank
10 km Sprint	Xavier Blond	3	28:36.6	56
10 km Sprint	Hervé Flandin	4	28:21.4	52
10 km Sprint	Christian Dumont	2	28:20.3	51
10 km Sprint	Francis Mougel	3	27:34.9	32

Event	Athlete	Time	Misses	Adjusted time ^{2}	Rank
20 km	Hervé Flandin	59:50.9	7	1'06:50.9	56
20 km	Éric Claudon	58:16.8	6	1'04:16.8	45
20 km	Thierry Gerbier	57:51.7	6	1'03:51.7	41
20 km	Jean-Paul Giachino	57:43.7	3	1'00:43.7	18

Men's 4 x 7.5 km relay

Athletes	Race		
Athletes	Misses ^{1}	Time	Rank
Éric Claudon; Jean-Paul Giachino; Hervé Flandin; Francis Mougel	6	1'30:22.8	10

^{1} A penalty loop of 150 metres had to be skied per missed target.
^{2} One minute added per missed target.

== Cross-country skiing ==
Men

Event	Athlete	Race	
Event	Athlete	Time	Rank
15 km C	Claude Pierrat	47:54.3	56
15 km C	Guy Balland	46:39.9	48
15 km C	Patrick Rémy	45:45.3	37
15 km C	Jean-Luc Thomas	44:26.5	26
30 km C	Patrick Rémy	1'40:24.5	68
30 km C	Dominique Locatelli	1'35:40.0	50
30 km C	Claude Pierrat	1'34:15.6	43
30 km C	Guy Balland	1'30:20.4	24
50 km F	Jean-Luc Thomas	DNF	–
50 km F	Dominique Locatelli	2'13:56.8	37
50 km F	Guy Balland	2'11:58.7	24
50 km F	Claude Pierrat	2'09:54.9	17

C = Classical style, F = Freestyle

Men's 4 × 10 km relay

Athletes	Race	
Athletes	Time	Rank
Patrick Rémy; Jean-Luc Thomas; Dominique Locatelli; Guy Balland	1'49:15.9	11

== Figure skating ==
Men

Athlete	CF	SP	FS	TFP	Rank
Axel Médéric	13	14	17	30.4	15

Women

Athlete	CF	SP	FS	TFP	Rank
Agnès Gosselin	12	21	18	34.2	16

Ice Dancing

Athletes	CD	OD	FD	TFP	Rank
Corinne Paliard; Didier Courtois	15	14	14	28.4	14
Isabelle Duchesnay; Paul Duchesnay	8	8	8	16.0	8

== Ice hockey ==
=== Group A ===
Top three teams (shaded ones) entered the medal round.

	Pld	W	L	T	GF	GA	Pts
Finland	5	3	1	1	22	8	7
Sweden	5	2	0	3	23	10	7
Canada	5	3	1	1	17	12	7
Switzerland	5	3	2	0	19	10	6
Poland	5	1	3	1	9	13	3
France	5	0	5	0	10	47	0

- Sweden 13-2 France
- Finland 10-1 France
- Poland 6-2 France*
- Canada 9-5 France
- Switzerland 9-0 France

* The Polish team was stripped of its victory after Jarosław Morawiecki tested positive for testosterone. France was recorded as having a 2-nil win, but received no points in the standings.

=== Game for 11th place ===
Team 1	Score	Team 2
France	7–6 SO	Norway

Team roster

- Jean-Marc Djian
- Patrick Foliot
- Daniel Maric
- Stéphane Botteri
- Michel Leblanc
- Jean-Philippe Lemoine
- Jean-Christophe Lerondeau
- François Ouimet
- Denis Perez
- Pierre Schmitt
- Steven Woodburn
- Peter Almasy
- Paulin Bordeleau
- Philippe Bozon
- Guy Dupuis
- Derek Haas
- Stéphane Lessard
- Franck Pajonkowski
- André Peloffy
- Christian Pouget
- Pierre Pousse
- Antoine Richer
- Christophe Ville

- Head coach: Unknown

== Luge ==
Women

Athlete	Run 1		Run 2		Run 3		Run 4		Total	
Athlete	Time	Rank	Time	Rank	Time	Rank	Time	Rank	Time	Rank
Laurence Bonici	48.436	22	48.790	22	48.692	21	48.488	22	3:14.406	22

== Nordic combined ==
Men's individual

Events:

- normal hill ski jumping (Best two out of three jumps.)
- 15 km cross-country skiing (Start delay, based on ski jumping results.)

Athlete	Event	Ski Jumping		Cross-country		Total	
Athlete	Event	Points	Rank	Start at	Time	Points	Rank
Francis Reppelin	Individual	159.9	42	7:37.4	DNF	DNF	–
Jean-Pierre Bohard	Individual	183.2	35	5:02.0	46:35.9	367.965	39
Fabrice Guy	Individual	192.1	29	4:02.7	43:22.4	396.995	20
Xavier Girard	Individual	193.9	27	3:50.7	44:50.9	383.720	32

Men's Team

Three participants per team.

Events:

- normal hill ski jumping (Three jumps per team member per round, best two rounds counted.)
- 10 km cross-country skiing (Start delay, based on ski jumping results.)

Athletes	Ski jumping		Cross-country		Total
Athletes	Points	Rank	Start at	Time	Rank
Jean-Pierre Bohard; Xavier Girard; Fabrice Guy	541.0	8	7:24.0	1'27:09.4	8

== Ski jumping ==
Athlete	Event	Jump 1		Jump 2		Total	
Athlete	Event	Distance	Points	Distance	Points	Points	Rank
Frédéric Berger	Normal hill	75.0	80.6	75.5	83.9	164.5	49
Didier Mollard	Normal hill	79.0	89.5	77.0	84.8	174.3	34
Didier Mollard	Large hill	108.0	101.1	94.0	76.5	177.6	25

== Speed skating ==
Men

Event	Athlete	Race	
Event	Athlete	Time	Rank
500 m	Hans van Helden	39.05	33
500 m	Claude Nicouleau	38.63	31
1000 m	Claude Nicouleau	1:17.91	33
1000 m	Hans van Helden	1:16.32	29
1500 m	Hans van Helden	1:55.61	19
5000 m	Hans van Helden	6:57.69	22
10,000 m	Hans van Helden	14:34.84	23

Women

Event	Athlete	Race	
Event	Athlete	Time	Rank
500 m	Stéphanie Dumont	43.30	29
500 m	Marie-France van Helden	42.49	27
1500 m	Stéphanie Dumont	2:13.01	27
3000 m	Stéphanie Dumont	4:38.03	27
3000 m	Marie-France van Helden	4:32.34	24
5000 m	Stéphanie Dumont	8:00.40	25

== Demonstration sports ==
=== Curling ===
- Catherine Lefebvre
- Annick Mercier
- Agnès Mercier
- Andrée Dupont-Roc
