= France at the 1998 Winter Olympics =

- IOC code: FRA
- NOC: French National Olympic and Sports Committee
- Website: www.franceolympique.com (in French)

in Nagano
- Competitors: 106 (75 men, 31 women) in 12 sports
- Flag bearer: Philippe Candeloro (figure skating)
- Medals Ranked 13th: Gold 2 Silver 1 Bronze 5 Total 8

Winter Olympics appearances (overview)
- 1924; 1928; 1932; 1936; 1948; 1952; 1956; 1960; 1964; 1968; 1972; 1976; 1980; 1984; 1988; 1992; 1994; 1998; 2002; 2006; 2010; 2014; 2018; 2022; 2026

France competed at the 1998 Winter Olympics in Nagano, Japan.

== Medalists ==
Medal	Name	Sport	Event	Date
Gold	Karine Ruby	Snowboarding	Women's giant slalom	10 February
Gold	Jean-Luc Crétier	Alpine skiing	Men's downhill	13 February
Silver	Sébastien Foucras	Freestyle skiing	Men's aerials	18 February
Bronze	Philippe Candeloro	Figure skating	Men's singles	14 February
Bronze	Florence Masnada	Alpine skiing	Women's downhill	16 February
Bronze	Marina Anissina; Gwendal Peizerat	Figure skating	Ice dance	16 February
Bronze	Sylvain Guillaume; Nicolas Bal; Ludovic Roux; Fabrice Guy	Nordic combined	Team	20 February
Bronze	Bruno Mingeon; Emanuel Hostache; Éric Le Chanony; Max Robert	Bobsleigh	Four-man	21 February

== Competitors ==
The following is the list of number of competitors in the Games.

Sport	Men	Women	Total
Alpine skiing	10	8	18
Biathlon	5	5	10
Bobsleigh	5	–	5
Cross-country skiing	4	4	8
Figure skating	6	8	14
Freestyle skiing	6	1	7
Ice hockey	22	0	22
Nordic combined	4	–	4
Short track speed skating	2	0	2
Ski jumping	2	–	2
Snowboarding	8	5	13
Speed skating	1	0	1
Total	75	31	106

== Alpine skiing ==
Men

Athlete	Event	Race 1	Race 2	Total	
Athlete	Event	Time	Time	Time	Rank
Adrien Duvillard	Downhill			DNF	–
Nicolas Burtin	Downhill			DNF	–
Jean-Luc Crétier	Downhill			1:50.11	1st place, gold medalist(s)
Nicolas Burtin	Super-G			DSQ	–
Frédéric Marin-Cudraz	Super-G			DNF	–
Jean-Luc Crétier	Super-G			1:37.95	25
Ian Piccard	Giant Slalom	1:22.08	1:19.02	2:41.10	11
Joël Chenal	Giant Slalom	1:22.05	DSQ	DSQ	–
Christophe Saioni	Giant Slalom	1:21.84	1:19.40	2:41.24	13
François Simond	Slalom	DNF	–	DNF	–
Sébastien Amiez	Slalom	56.96	55.23	1:52.19	14
Joël Chenal	Slalom	56.68	54.83	1:51.51	8
Pierrick Bourgeat	Slalom	56.28	55.54	1:51.82	10

Women

Athlete	Event	Race 1	Race 2	Total	
Athlete	Event	Time	Time	Time	Rank
Carole Montillet-Carles	Downhill			1:30.65	14
Régine Cavagnoud	Downhill			1:29.72	7
Mélanie Suchet	Downhill			1:29.48	4
Florence Masnada	Downhill			1:29.37	3rd place, bronze medalist(s)
Florence Masnada	Super-G			1:19.03	18
Régine Cavagnoud	Super-G			1:18.91	16
Carole Montillet-Carles	Super-G			1:18.88	14
Mélanie Suchet	Super-G			1:18.51	8
Leila Piccard	Giant Slalom	DNF	–	DNF	–
Sophie Lefranc	Giant Slalom	1:19.88	1:33.39	2:53.27	5
Patricia Chauvet-Blanc	Slalom	DNF	–	DNF	–
Laure Pequegnot	Slalom	DNF	–	DNF	–
Leila Piccard	Slalom	46.25	DNF	DNF	–

Women's combined

Athlete	Downhill	Slalom		Total	
Athlete	Time	Time 1	Time 2	Total time	Rank
Florence Masnada	1:29.87	37.21	35.76	2:42.84	6

== Biathlon ==
Men

Event	Athlete	Misses ^{1}	Time	Rank
10 km Sprint	Raphaël Poirée	DNF	DNF	–
10 km Sprint	Andreas Heymann	2	33:06.9	69
10 km Sprint	Julien Robert	0	32:52.4	67
10 km Sprint	Thierry Dusserre	1	30:43.6	50

Event	Athlete	Time	Misses	Adjusted time ^{2}	Rank
20 km	Andreas Heymann	58:42.7	6	1'04:42.7	57
20 km	Thierry Dusserre	1'01:26.6	1	1'02:26.6	46
20 km	Julien Robert	1'01:01.6	1	1'02:01.6	40
20 km	Raphaël Poirée	58:08.4	2	1'00:08.4	22

Men's 4 × 7.5 km relay

Athletes	Race		
Athletes	Misses ^{1}	Time	Rank
Andreas Heymann; Raphaël Poirée; Thierry Dusserre; Patrice Bailly-Salins	2	1'24:53.0	7

Women

Event	Athlete	Misses ^{1}	Time	Rank
7.5 km Sprint	Anne Briand-Bouthiaux	5	26:16.1	54
7.5 km Sprint	Florence Baverel-Robert	1	25:39.6	43
7.5 km Sprint	Corinne Niogret	2	24:54.7	25
7.5 km Sprint	Emmanuelle Claret	1	24:08.7	14

Event	Athlete	Time	Misses	Adjusted time ^{2}	Rank
15 km	Florence Baverel-Robert	1'05:42.8	4	1'09:42.8	63
15 km	Christelle Gros	59:33.8	7	1'06:33.8	59
15 km	Anne Briand-Bouthiaux	55:13.1	3	58:13.1	20
15 km	Corinne Niogret	56:51.1	1	57:51.1	16

Women's 4 × 7.5 km relay

Athletes	Race		
Athletes	Misses ^{1}	Time	Rank
Christelle Gros; Emmanuelle Claret; Florence Baverel-Robert; Corinne Niogret	0	1'43:54.6	8

^{1} A penalty loop of 150 metres had to be skied per missed target.
^{2} One minute added per missed target.

== Bobsleigh ==
Sled	Athletes	Event	Run 1		Run 2		Run 3		Run 4		Total	
Sled	Athletes	Event	Time	Rank	Time	Rank	Time	Rank	Time	Rank	Time	Rank
FRA-1	Bruno Mingeon; Emmanuel Hostache	Two-man	54.80	6	54.65	7	54.55	10	54.62	10	3:38.62	9
FRA-2	Éric Alard; Éric Le Chanony	Two-man	55.25	15	54.75	11	54.73	13	54.58	9	3:39.31	13

Sled	Athletes	Event	Run 1		Run 2		Run 3		Total	
Sled	Athletes	Event	Time	Rank	Time	Rank	Time	Rank	Time	Rank
FRA-1	Bruno Mingeon; Emmanuel Hostache; Éric Le Chanony; Max Robert	Four-man	53.13	8	53.30	3	53.63	1	2:40.06	3rd place, bronze medalist(s)

== Cross-country skiing ==
Men

Event	Athlete	Race	
Event	Athlete	Time	Rank
10 km C	Philippe Sanchez	31:03.5	59
10 km C	Vincent Vittoz	29:03.5	24
10 km C	Patrick Rémy	28:55.2	20
15 km pursuit^{1} F	Patrick Rémy	43:56.8	30
15 km pursuit^{1} F	Vincent Vittoz	42:31.9	19
30 km C	Patrick Rémy	DNF	–
50 km F	Vincent Vittoz	2'14:16.2	21
50 km F	Hervé Balland	2'11:55.9	14

^{1} Starting delay based on 10 km results.
C = Classical style, F = Freestyle

Men's 4 × 10 km relay

Athletes	Race	
Athletes	Time	Rank
Vincent Vittoz; Patrick Rémy; Hervé Balland; Philippe Sanchez	1'45:00.2	13

Women

Event	Athlete	Race	
Event	Athlete	Time	Rank
5 km C	Anne-Laure Condevaux	20:21.2	64
5 km C	Karine Philippot	19:38.6	52
5 km C	Annick Vaxelaire-Pierrel	19:33.4	49
5 km C	Sophie Villeneuve	19:05.5	32
10 km pursuit^{2} F	Annick Vaxelaire-Pierrel	32:20.0	37
10 km pursuit^{2} F	Karine Philippot	32:00.3	33
10 km pursuit^{2} F	Sophie Villeneuve	31:31.5	27
15 km C	Annick Vaxelaire-Pierrel	52:30.1	45
30 km F	Karine Philippot	1'29:51.6	22
30 km F	Sophie Villeneuve	1'28:57.8	17

^{2} Starting delay based on 5 km results.
C = Classical style, F = Freestyle

Women's 4 × 5 km relay

Athletes	Race	
Athletes	Time	Rank
Sophie Villeneuve; Annick Vaxelaire-Pierrel; Anne-Laure Condevaux; Karine Philippot	58:27.7	11

== Figure skating ==
Men

Athlete	SP	FS	TFP	Rank
Philippe Candeloro	5	2	4.5	3rd place, bronze medalist(s)

Women

Athlete	SP	FS	TFP	Rank
Laëtitia Hubert	12	21	27.0	20
Surya Bonaly	6	11	14.0	10
Vanessa Gusmeroli	8	6	10.0	6

Pairs

Athletes	SP	FS	TFP	Rank
Sabrina Lefrançois; Nicolas Osseland	17	17	25.5	17
Sarah Abitbol; Stéphane Bernadis	7	6	9.5	6

Ice Dancing

Athletes	CD1	CD2	OD	FD	TFP	Rank
Dominique Deniaud; Martial Jaffredo	20	21	21	20	40.8	20
Sophie Moniotte; Pascal Lavanchy	10	10	12	11	22.2	11
Marina Anissina; Gwendal Peizerat	3	3	3	4	7.0	3rd place, bronze medalist(s)

== Freestyle skiing ==
Men

Athlete	Event	Qualification			Final		
Athlete	Event	Time	Points	Rank	Time	Points	Rank
Olivier Cotte	Moguls	28.66	23.46	20	did not advance		
Julien Regnier-Lafforgue	Moguls	28.20	24.20	12 Q	25.93	24.64	11
Fabrice Ougier	Moguls	27.72	24.26	11 Q	25.88	24.22	12
Thony Hemery	Moguls	26.18	25.06	6 Q	DNF	DNF	–
Jean-Damien Climonet	Aerials		186.81	16	did not advance		
Sébastien Foucras	Aerials		200.27	12 Q		248.79	2nd place, silver medalist(s)

Women

Athlete	Event	Qualification			Final		
Athlete	Event	Time	Points	Rank	Time	Points	Rank
Candice Gilg	Moguls	DNF	–	–	–	DNF	–

== Ice hockey ==
=== Men's tournament ===
==== Preliminary round - Group B ====
Top team (shaded) advanced to the first round.

Team	GP	W	L	T	GF	GA	GD	Pts
Belarus	3	2	0	1	14	4	+10	5
Germany	3	2	1	0	7	9	-2	4
France	3	1	2	0	5	8	-3	2
Japan	3	0	2	1	5	10	-5	1

All times are local (UTC-7).

7 February 1998	France	0 – 4 (0-1, 0-1, 0-2)	Belarus	The Big Hat/ Aqua Wing Arena, Nagano, Japan; Attendance: 3,419

9 February 1998	Japan	2 – 5 (2-1, 0-1, 0-3)	France	The Big Hat/ Aqua Wing Arena, Nagano, Japan; Attendance: 9,930

10 February 1998	France	0 – 2 (0-0, 0-1, 0-1)	Germany	The Big Hat/ Aqua Wing Arena, Nagano, Japan; Attendance: 3,916

==== Consolation round - 11th place match ====
All times are local (UTC-7).

12 February 1998	France 11th	5 – 1 (1-0, 0-0, 4-1)	Italy	The Big Hat/ Aqua Wing Arena, Nagano, Japan; Attendance: 8,854

==== Leading scorers ====
Rank	Player	GP	G	A	Pts	PIM
5th	Philippe Bozon	4	5	2	7	4

- Team roster
  - François Gravel
  - Cristobal Huet
  - Fabrice Lhenry
  - Serge Poudrier
  - Denis Perez
  - Jean-Philippe Lemoine
  - Serge Djelloul
  - Karl Dewolf
  - Jean-Christophe Filippin
  - Grégory Dubois
  - Philippe Bozon
  - Christian Pouget
  - Stéphane Barin
  - Bob Ouellet
  - Jonathan Zwikel
  - Anthony Mortas
  - Arnaud Briand
  - Richard Aimonetto
  - Pierre Allard
  - Maurice Rozenthal
  - François Rozenthal
  - Laurent Gras
  - Roger Dubé
- Head coach: Jimmy Tibbets

== Nordic combined ==
Men's individual

Events:

- normal hill ski jumping
- 15 km cross-country skiing (Start delay, based on ski jumping results.)

Athlete	Event	Ski Jumping		Cross-country time	Total rank
Athlete	Event	Points	Rank	Cross-country time	Total rank
Fabrice Guy	Individual	201.5	28	46:43.3	29
Ludovic Roux	Individual	202.5	27	46:52.2	31
Sylvain Guillaume	Individual	212.5	16	43:42.5	9
Nicolas Bal	Individual	218.5	11	42:46.8	7

Men's Team

Four participants per team.

Events:

- normal hill ski jumping
- 5 km cross-country skiing (Start delay, based on ski jumping results.)

Athletes	Ski jumping		Cross-country time	Total rank
Athletes	Points	Rank	Cross-country time	Total rank
Sylvain Guillaume; Nicolas Bal; Ludovic Roux; Fabrice Guy	863.0	6	55:53.4	3rd place, bronze medalist(s)

== Short track speed skating ==
Men

Athlete	Event	Round one		Quarter finals		Semi finals		Finals	
Athlete	Event	Time	Rank	Time	Rank	Time	Rank	Time	Final rank
Ludovic Mathieu	500 m	43.767	4	did not advance					
Bruno Loscos	500 m	43.725	3	did not advance					
Ludovic Mathieu	1000 m	1:36.076	4	did not advance					
Bruno Loscos	1000 m	1:30.805	3	did not advance					

== Ski jumping ==
Athlete	Event	Jump 1			Jump 2		Total	
Athlete	Event	Distance	Points	Rank	Distance	Points	Points	Rank
Jérôme Gay	Normal hill	74.0	82.0	37	did not advance			
Nicolas Dessum	Normal hill	83.0	101.5	15 Q	82.5	100.5	202.0	16
Jérôme Gay	Large hill	115.5	107.9	17 Q	118.0	111.4	219.3	21
Nicolas Dessum	Large hill	118.5	113.3	10 Q	119.0	115.2	228.5	16

== Snowboarding ==
Men's giant slalom

Athlete	Race 1	Race 2	Total	
Athlete	Time	Time	Time	Rank
Maxence Idesheim	1:00.75	1:04.77	2:05.52	8
Mathieu Bozzetto	59.83	1:04.74	2:04.57	5
Nicolas Conte	59.69	DNF	DNF	–
Christophe Ségura	59.59	1:09.27	2:08.86	12

Men's halfpipe

Athlete	Qualifying round 1		Qualifying round 2		Final	
Athlete	Points	Rank	Points	Rank	Points	Rank
Jean Baptiste Charlet	31.3	29	39.6	5 QF	73.4	12
Tony Vannucci Roos	36.2	14	35.8	17	did not advance	
Jonathan Collomb-Patton	38.2	8 QF			75.5	10
Guillaume Chastagnol	40.2	2 QF			78.3	5

Women's giant slalom

Athlete	Race 1	Race 2	Total	
Athlete	Time	Time	Time	Rank
Nathalie Desmares	1:21.43	1:08.42	2:29.85	17
Charlotte Bernard	1:14.43	1:14.30	2:28.73	16
Isabelle Blanc	1:11.28	DSQ	DSQ	–
Karine Ruby	1:09.33	1:08.01	2:17.34	1st place, gold medalist(s)

Women's halfpipe

Athlete	Qualifying round 1		Qualifying round 2		Final	
Athlete	Points	Rank	Points	Rank	Points	Rank
Doriane Vidal	27.2	17	32.1	8	did not advance	

== Speed skating ==
Men

Event	Athlete	Race	
Event	Athlete	Time	Rank
1500 m	Cédric Kuentz	1:54.78	37
5000 m	Cédric Kuentz	6:45.90	19
