= Cross-country skiing at the 1988 Winter Olympics – Men's 4 × 10 kilometre relay =

Men's 4 × 10 kilometre relay at the XV Olympic Winter Games
- Pictogram for cross country
- Venue: Canmore Nordic Centre Provincial Park
- Dates: 24 February 1988
- Competitors: 64 (16 teams) from 16 nations
- Winning time: 1:43:58.6

Medalists
1st place, gold medalist(s)		Jan Ottosson; Thomas Wassberg; Gunde Svan; Torgny Mogren; Sweden
2nd place, silver medalist(s)		Vladimir Smirnov; Vladimir Sakhnov; Mikhail Devyatyarov; Alexey Prokurorov; Soviet Union
3rd place, bronze medalist(s)		Radim Nyč; Václav Korunka; Pavel Benc; Ladislav Švanda; Czechoslovakia

The men's 4 × 10 km relay cross-country skiing competition at the 1988 Winter Olympics in Calgary, Canada, took place on Wednesday 24 February at the Canmore Nordic Centre Provincial Park in Canmore, Alberta. The race saw Sweden beat Soviet Union by 12.7 seconds, with Czechoslovakia finishing third.

== Results ==
Rank	Bib	Country	Time	Deficit
1st place, gold medalist(s)	1	Sweden; Jan Ottosson; Thomas Wassberg; Gunde Svan; Torgny Mogren	1:43:58.6	–
2nd place, silver medalist(s)	2	Soviet Union; Vladimir Smirnov; Vladimir Sakhnov; Mikhail Devyatyarov; Alexey Prokurorov	1:44:11.3	+12.7
3rd place, bronze medalist(s)	14	Czechoslovakia; Radim Nyč; Václav Korunka; Pavel Benc; Ladislav Švanda	1:45:22.7	+1:24.1
4	5	Switzerland; Andi Grünenfelder; Jürg Capol; Giachem Guidon; Jeremias Wigger	1:46:16.3	+2:17.7
5	7	Italy; Silvano Barco; Albert Walder; Giorgio Vanzetta; Maurilio De Zolt	1:46:16.7	+2:18.1
6	4	Norway; Pål Gunnar Mikkelsplass; Oddvar Brå; Vegard Ulvang; Terje Langli	1:46:48.7	+2:50.1
7	6	West Germany; Walter Kuß; Georg Fischer; Jochen Behle; Herbert Fritzenwenger	1:48:05.0	+4:06.4
8	3	Finland; Jari Laukkanen; Harri Kirvesniemi; Jari Räsänen; Kari Ristanen	1:48:24.0	+4:25.4
9	13	Canada; Yves Bilodeau; Al Pilcher; Pierre Harvey; Dennis Lawrence	1:48:59.7	+5:01.1
10	10	Austria; Andre Blatter; Alois Schwarz; Johann Standmann; Alois Stadlober	1:49:14.5	+5:15.9
11	16	France; Patrick Rémy; Jean-Luc Thomas; Dominique Locatelli; Guy Balland	1:49:15.9	+5:17.3
12	9	Bulgaria; Svetoslav Atanasov; Ivan Smilenov; Atanas Simidchiev; Todor Makhov	1:49:27.9	+5:29.3
13	8	United States; Todd Boonstra; Dan Simoneau; Bill Spencer; Joe Galanes	1:50:27.6	+6:29.0
14	11	Japan; Atsushi Egawa; Kazunari Sasaki; Tanayuki Yuki; Masaharu Yamazaki	1:51:10.7	+7:12.1
15	15	South Korea; Hong Kun-Pyo; Park Ki-Ho; Cho Sung-Hoon; Jun Yeung-Hae	1:59:00.4	+15:01.8
16	12	Great Britain; John Spotswood; Ewan McKenzie; Martin Watkins; Andrew Wylie	1:59:39.3	+15:40.7
