= Luge at the 1988 Winter Olympics – Women's singles =

Women's singles at the XV Olympic Winter Games
- Venue: Canada Olympic Park
- Dates: 16–18 February 1988
- Competitors: 24 from 12 nations
- Winning time: 3:03.973

Medalists
1st place, gold medalist(s)		Steffi Walter-Martin	East Germany
2nd place, silver medalist(s)		Ute Oberhoffner-Weiß	East Germany
3rd place, bronze medalist(s)		Cerstin Schmidt	East Germany

The Women's singles luge competition at the 1988 Winter Olympics in Calgary was held on 16 and 18 February, at Canada Olympic Park.

== Results ==
Rank	Athlete	Country	Run 1	Run 2	Run 3	Run 4	Total
1st place, gold medalist(s)	Steffi Walter-Martin	East Germany	45.828	46.173	45.969	46.003	3:03.973
2nd place, silver medalist(s)	Ute Oberhoffner-Weiß	East Germany	45.906	46.057	46.150	45.992	3:04.105
3rd place, bronze medalist(s)	Cerstin Schmidt	East Germany	46.078	46.020	46.059	46.024	3:04.181
4	Veronika Bilgeri	West Germany	46.321	46.375	46.369	46.605	3:05.670
5	Yuliya Antipova	Soviet Union	46.449	46.425	46.610	46.303	3:05.787
6	Bonny Warner	United States	46.409	46.643	46.633	46.371	3:06.056
7	Marie-Claude Doyon	Canada	46.372	46.596	46.796	46.447	3:06.211
8	Nadezhda Danilina	Soviet Union	46.597	46.447	46.613	46.707	3:06.364
9	Cammy Myler	United States	46.502	46.888	46.828	46.617	3:06.835
10	Irina Kusakina	Soviet Union	46.690	47.071	46.643	46.639	3:07.043
11	Erica Terwillegar	United States	46.506	47.300	46.780	46.705	3:07.291
12	Andrea Tagwerker	Austria	46.787	47.140	46.735	46.839	3:07.501
13	Veronika Oberhuber	Italy	46.720	46.963	47.118	46.715	3:07.516
14	Gerda Weissensteiner	Italy	46.814	47.183	46.908	46.760	3:07.665
15	Maria-Luise Rainer	Italy	47.142	46.947	47.064	46.992	3:08.145
16	Anne Abernathy	Virgin Islands	47.106	47.316	47.742	47.073	3:09.237
17	Livia Pelin	Romania	47.204	47.541	47.601	47.305	3:09.651
18	Mina Tanaka	Japan	47.770	47.945	47.928	47.599	3:11.242
19	Kathy Salmon	Canada	47.569	48.112	48.356	47.670	3:11.707
20	Alyson Wreford	Great Britain	49.888	48.247	47.869	47.726	3:13.730
21	Hitomi Koshimizu	Japan	47.682	49.276	49.160	48.008	3:14.126
22	Laurence Bonici	France	48.436	48.790	48.692	48.488	3:14.406
23	Simoneta Racheva	Bulgaria	48.790	48.836	48.698	48.533	3:14.857
24	Teng Pi-Hui	Chinese Taipei	48.282	48.431	49.610	50.804	3:17.127
