= Cross-country skiing at the 1988 Winter Olympics – Men's 15 kilometre classical =

Men's 15 kilometre classical at the XV Olympic Winter Games
- Venue: Canmore Nordic Centre Provincial Park
- Dates: 19 February 1988
- Competitors: 90 from 33 nations
- Winning time: 41:18.9

Medalists
1st place, gold medalist(s)		Mikhail Devyatyarov; Soviet Union
2nd place, silver medalist(s)		Pål Gunnar Mikkelsplass; Norway
3rd place, bronze medalist(s)		Vladimir Smirnov; Soviet Union

The men's 15 kilometre classical cross-country skiing competition at the 1988 Winter Olympics in Calgary, Canada, was held on 19 February at the Canmore Nordic Centre.

Each skier started at half a minute intervals, skiing the entire 15 kilometre course. Marco Albarello of Italy was the 1987 World champion and Gunde Svan of Sweden was the defending champion from the 1984 Olympics in Sarajevo, Yugoslavia.

== Results ==
Rank	Bib	Name	Country	Time	Deficit
1st place, gold medalist(s)	86	Mikhail Devyatyarov	Soviet Union	41:18.9	–
2nd place, silver medalist(s)	29	Pål Gunnar Mikkelsplass	Norway	41:33.4	+14.5
3rd place, bronze medalist(s)	40	Vladimir Smirnov	Soviet Union	41:48.5	+29.6
4	76	Oddvar Brå	Norway	42:17.3	+58.4
5	62	Uwe Bellmann	East Germany	42:17.8	+58.9
6	10	Maurilio De Zolt	Italy	42:31.2	+1:12.3
7	64	Vegard Ulvang	Norway	42:31.5	+1:12.6
8	35	Harri Kirvesniemi	Finland	42:42.8	+1:23.9
9	61	Marco Albarello	Italy	42:48.6	+1:29.7
10	85	Giorgio Vanzetta	Italy	42:49.6	+1:30.7
11	59	Christer Majbäck	Sweden	42:58.6	+1:39.7
12	3	Terje Langli	Norway	42:59.3	+1:40.4
13	84	Gianfranco Polvara	Italy	43:07.3	+1:48.4
14	23	Gunde Svan	Sweden	43:08.3	+1:49.4
15	1	Alexander Batyuk	Soviet Union	43:08.7	+1:49.8
16	7	Jan Ottosson	Sweden	43:18.1	+1:59.2
17	12	Pierre Harvey	Canada	43:22.0	+2:03.1
18	75	Alexey Prokourorov	Soviet Union	43:36.9	+2:18.0
19	43	Ladislav Švanda	Czechoslovakia	43:40.9	+2:22.0
20	11	Aki Karvonen	Finland	43:54.5	+2:35.6
21	37	Holger Bauroth	East Germany	43:59.2	+2:40.3
22	83	Jürg Capol	Switzerland	43:59.5	+2:40.6
23	80	Jochen Behle	West Germany	43:59.7	+2:40.8
24	49	Torgny Mogren	Sweden	44:12.1	+2:53.2
25	92	Jari Laukkanen	Finland	44:22.0	+3:03.1
26	91	Jean-Luc Thomas	France	44:26.5	+3:07.6
27	55	Walter Kuss	West Germany	44:29.0	+3:10.1
28	87	Václav Korunka	Czechoslovakia	44:47.6	+3:28.7
29	24	Dan Simoneau	United States	44:53.8	+3:34.9
30	60	Jari Räsänen	Finland	45:04.5	+3:45.6
31	41	Alois Schwarz	Austria	45:06.9	+3:48.0
32	21	Andre Blatter	Austria	45:15.2	+3:56.3
33	52	Chris Herberle	Australia	45:19.5	+4:00.6
34	47	Yves Bilodeau	Canada	45:26.6	+4:07.7
35	56	Andi Grünenfelder	Switzerland	45:35.5	+4:16.6
36	73	Alois Stadlober	Austria	45:38.5	+4:19.6
37	50	Patrick Rémy	France	45:45.3	+4:26.4
38	28	John Spotswood	Great Britain	45:47.3	+4:28.4
39	70	Janež Kršinar	Yugoslavia	45:54.8	+4:35.9
40	89	Bill Spencer	United States	45:59.6	+4:40.7
41	53	Pavel Benc	Czechoslovakia	46:01.6	+4:42.7
42	78	Johann Standmann	Austria	46:04.1	+4:45.2
43	19	Martin Petrásek	Czechoslovakia	46:07.8	+4:48.9
44	25	Sašo Grajf	Yugoslavia	46:12.3	+4:53.4
45	63	Kazunari Sasaki	Japan	46:12.6	+4:53.7
46	57	Al Pilcher	Canada	46:21.1	+5:02.2
47	90	Dennis Lawrence	Canada	46:26.3	+5:07.4
48	67	Guy Balland	France	46:36.9	+5:18.0
49	9	Stanislav Atanasov	Bulgaria	46:43.0	+5:24.1
50	72	Benjamin Eberle	Liechtenstein	46:49.3	+5:30.4
51	34	Patrik Hasler	Liechtenstein	47:07.3	+5:48.4
52	27	Tanayuki Yuki	Japan	47:08.4	+5:49.5
53	58	Todd Boonstra	United States	47:21.8	+6:02.9
54	30	Ki Ho Park	South Korea	47:44.3	+6:25.4
55	77	Todor Makhov	Bulgaria	47:47.5	+6:28.6
56	6	Claude Pierrat	France	47:54.3	+6:35.4
57	46	Gábor Mayer	Hungary	47:56.2	+6:37.3
58	16	Joseph Galanes	United States	48:05.2	+6:46.3
59	82	Jun Jeung-hae	South Korea	48:22.3	+7:03.4
60	4	Patrick Winterton	Great Britain	48:36.0	+7:17.1
61	65	Jordi Ribó	Spain	48:40.7	+7:21.8
62	69	Ziitsagaany Ganbat	Mongolia	48:48.9	+7:30.0
63	44	José Giro	Spain	48:54.2	+7:35.3
64	68	Mano Ketenzhiev	Bulgaria	48:54.7	+7:35.8
65	88	Martin Watkins	Great Britain	49:16.6	+7:57.7
66	71	Christos Titas	Greece	49:48.6	+8:29.7
67	36	Atanas Simidchev	Bulgaria	49:53.6	+8:34.7
68	5	Masaharu Yamazaki	Japan	50:06.8	+8:47.9
69	48	Dambajantsagiin Battulga	Mongolia	50:09.4	+8:50.5
70	38	David Hislop	Australia	50:19.8	+9:00.9
71	15	Hong Kun-pyo	South Korea	50:21.4	+9:02.5
72	32	Athanasios Tsakiris	Greece	50:34.4	+9:15.5
73	74	Ronald Howden	Great Britain	50:47.4	+9:28.5
74	42	Zhao Jun	China	50:55.2	+9:36.3
75	66	Sung-Hoon Cho	South Korea	51:31.1	+10:12.2
76	26	Saim Koca	Turkey	51:36.6	+10:17.7
77	54	Abdullah Yilmaz	Turkey	51:54.6	+10:35.7
78	13	Fikret Ören	Turkey	52:05.1	+10:46.2
79	79	Erhan Dursum	Turkey	52:18.3	+10:59.4
80	31	Dag Rene Burgos	Guatemala	53:00.8	+11:41.9
81	8	Ricardo Burgos	Guatemala	55:16.3	+13:57.4
82	39	Arturo Kinch	Costa Rica	59:37.9	+18:19.0
83	14	Rusiate Rogoyawa	Fiji	1:01:26.3	+20:07.4
84	18	Roberto Alvárez	Mexico	1:01:26.4	+20:07.5
85	22	Andrea Sammaritani	San Marino	1:02:58.1	+21:39.2
	2	Nikos Anastassiadis	Greece	DNF	
	17	Konstantin Ritter	Liechtenstein	DNF	
	20	Konrad Hallenbarter	Switzerland	DNF	
	33	Julio Moreschi	Argentina	DNF	
	45	Giachem Guidon	Switzerland	DNF	
	51	Einar Ólafsson	Iceland	DNS	
	81	Atsushi Egawa	Japan	DNS	
