= Luge at the 1992 Winter Olympics – Doubles =

Doubles at the XVI Olympic Winter Games
- Venue: La Plagne
- Dates: 14 February 1992
- Competitors: 40 from 15 nations
- Winning time: 1:32.053

Medalists
1st place, gold medalist(s)		Germany; Stefan Krauße, Jan Behrendt
2nd place, silver medalist(s)		Germany; Yves Mankel, Thomas Rudolph
3rd place, bronze medalist(s)		Italy; Hansjörg Raffl, Norbert Huber

The Doubles luge competition at the 1992 Winter Olympics in Albertville was held on 14 February, at La Plagne.

== Results ==
Rank	Athletes	Country	Run 1	Run 2	Total
1st place, gold medalist(s)	Stefan Krauße; Jan Behrendt	Germany	46.060	45.993	1:32.053
2nd place, silver medalist(s)	Yves Mankel; Thomas Rudolph	Germany	46.125	46.114	1:32.239
3rd place, bronze medalist(s)	Hansjörg Raffl; Norbert Huber	Italy	46.114	46.184	1:32.298
4	Ioan Apostol; Liviu Cepoi	Romania	46.315	46.334	1:32.649
5	Kurt Brugger; Wilfried Huber	Italy	46.447	46.363	1:32.810
6	Hans Kohala; Carl-Johan Lindqvist	Sweden	46.661	46.473	1:33.134
7	Gerhard Gleirscher; Markus Schmidt	Austria	46.514	46.743	1:33.257
8	Albert Demchenko; Aleksey Zelensky	Unified Team	46.552	46.747	1:33.299
9	Wendel Suckow; Bill Tavares	United States	46.787	46.664	1:33.451
10	Igor Lobanov; Gennady Belyakov	Unified Team	46.849	47.098	1:33.947
11	Aivars Polis; Roberts Suharevs	Latvia	46.988	46.961	1:33.949
12	Chris Thorpe; Gordy Sheer	United States	46.980	47.062	1:34.042
13	Christi-Adrian Sudu; Dan Doll	Canada	47.178	46.923	1:34.101
14	Bob Gasper; André Benoit	Canada	46.873	47.229	1:34.102
15	Petr Urban; Jan Kohoutek	Czechoslovakia	47.055	47.219	1:34.274
16	Harald Rolfsen; Snorre Pedersen	Norway	47.610	47.368	1:34.978
17	Ilko Karacholov; Ivan Karacholov	Bulgaria	47.538	47.514	1:35.052
18	Atsushi Sasaki; Yuji Sasaki	Japan	47.776	47.566	1:35.342
19	Yves Boyer; Frédéric Bertrand	France	48.847	48.060	1:36.907
20	Leszek Szarejko; Adrian Przechewka	Poland	47.127	1:07.927	1:55.054
