= Luge at the 1992 Winter Olympics – Men's singles =

Men's singles at the XVI Olympic Winter Games
- Venue: La Plagne
- Dates: 9–10 February 1992
- Competitors: 34 from 18 nations
- Winning time: 3:02.363

Medalists
1st place, gold medalist(s)		Georg Hackl	Germany
2nd place, silver medalist(s)		Markus Prock	Austria
3rd place, bronze medalist(s)		Markus Schmidt	Austria

The men's singles luge competition at the 1992 Winter Olympics in Albertville was held on 9 and 10 February, at La Plagne.

== Results ==
Rank	Athlete	Country	Run 1	Run 2	Run 3	Run 4	Total
1st place, gold medalist(s)	Georg Hackl	Germany	45.190	45.351	46.026	45.796	3:02.363
2nd place, silver medalist(s)	Markus Prock	Austria	45.356	45.330	46.075	45.908	3:02.669
3rd place, bronze medalist(s)	Markus Schmidt	Austria	45.243	45.416	46.254	46.029	3:02.942
4	Norbert Huber	Italy	45.506	45.400	46.105	45.962	3:02.973
5	Jens Müller	Germany	45.435	45.598	46.023	46.136	3:03.192
6	Robert Manzenreiter	Austria	45.573	45.550	46.222	45.922	3:03.267
7	Oswald Haselrieder	Italy	45.698	45.319	46.252	46.007	3:03.276
8	René Friedl	Germany	45.609	45.503	46.274	46.157	3:03.543
9	Sergey Danilin	Unified Team	45.708	45.622	46.281	46.162	3:03.773
10	Duncan Kennedy	United States	45.553	45.849	46.258	46.192	3:03.852
11	Gerhard Plankensteiner	Italy	45.676	45.752	46.313	46.167	3:03.908
12	Wendel Suckow	United States	45.838	45.874	46.416	46.067	3:04.195
13	Agris Elerts	Latvia	45.785	45.906	46.456	46.527	3:04.674
14	Mikael Holm	Sweden	46.202	45.794	46.914	46.382	3:05.292
15	Oleg Yermolin	Unified Team	46.046	46.176	46.569	46.504	3:05.295
16	Eduard Burmistrov	Unified Team	46.138	46.032	46.612	46.728	3:05.510
17	Kazuhiko Takamatsu	Japan	46.283	46.065	46.838	46.614	3:05.800
18	Harington Telford	Canada	45.924	46.426	46.829	47.016	3:06.195
19	Petr Urban	Czechoslovakia	46.211	46.285	46.961	46.812	3:06.269
20	Jan Kohoutek	Czechoslovakia	46.156	46.261	46.958	47.067	3:06.442
21	Robert Pipkins	United States	47.996	45.878	46.601	46.424	3:06.899
22	Olivier Fraise	France	46.287	47.278	46.981	46.814	3:07.360
23	Nick Ovett	Great Britain	46.517	46.456	47.257	47.173	3:07.403
24	Christi-Adrian Sudu	Canada	46.669	46.576	47.328	47.225	3:07.798
25	Pablo García	Spain	46.521	46.818	47.256	47.715	3:08.310
26	Ioan Apostol	Romania	46.728	46.913	47.516	47.626	3:08.783
27	Ian Whitehead	Great Britain	46.814	47.121	47.613	47.356	3:08.904
28	Yves Boyer	France	47.378	46.917	47.891	47.644	3:09.830
29	Simon Payne	Bermuda	47.741	47.517	47.942	47.973	3:11.173
30	Kyle Heikkila	Virgin Islands	46.886	47.170	48.486	48.636	3:11.178
31	Rubén González	Argentina	47.301	47.238	48.086	49.152	3:11.777
32	Frédéric Bertrand	France	47.663	47.800	48.443	49.050	3:12.956
33	Igor Špirić	Yugoslavia	48.261	47.947	48.707	48.508	3:13.423
34	Ismar Biogradlić	Yugoslavia	48.997	48.570	49.783	49.305	3:16.655
