= Chedal =

Chedal is a surname. Notable people with the surname include:

- Cathy Chedal (born 1968), French alpine skier
- Emmanuel Chedal (born 1983), French ski jumper
