= Radim Nyč =

Czech cross country skier (born 1983)

Personal information
- Nationality: Czech Republic
- Born: 11 April 1966 (age 60) Liberec, Czechoslovakia

Sport
- Sport: Skiing

World Cup career
- Seasons: 6 – (1988–1993)
- Indiv. starts: 23
- Indiv. podiums: 0
- Team starts: 8
- Team podiums: 3
- Team wins: 0
- Overall titles: 0 – (23rd in 1989, 1992)
Medal record
Men's cross-country skiing
Representing Czechoslovakia
Olympic Games
Bronze medal – third place	1988 Calgary	4 × 10 km relay
World Championships
Bronze medal – third place	1989 Lahti	4 × 10 km relay

Radim Nyč (born 11 April 1966) is a Czech former cross-country skier who competed from 1988 to 1994. He earned a bronze medal in the 4 × 10 km relay at the 1988 Winter Olympics in Calgary while his best individual Winter Olympics finish was a sixth in the 50 km event in 1992.

Nyč also won a bronze medal in the 4 × 10 km relay at the 1989 FIS Nordic World Ski Championships. His best individual finish at the World Championships was a 13th in the 15 km event at those same championships.

Nyč's best career World Cup finish was sixth in 1991 in Canada.

== Cross-country skiing results ==
All results are sourced from the International Ski Federation (FIS).

=== Olympic Games ===
- 1 medal – (1 bronze)

Year	Age	10 km	15 km	Pursuit	30 km	50 km	4 × 10 km relay
1988	21	—N/a	—	—N/a	25	20	Bronze
1992	25	33	—N/a	25	—	6	7

=== World Championships ===
- 1 medal – (1 bronze)

Year	Age	10 km	15 km classical	15 km freestyle	Pursuit	30 km	50 km	4 × 10 km relay
1989	22	—N/a	—	13	—N/a	—	DNF	Bronze
1991	24	33	—N/a	20	—N/a	—	—	8
1993	26	—	—N/a	—N/a	—	—	28	8

=== World Cup ===
==== Season standings ====
Season	Age	Overall
1988	21	NC
1989	22	23
1990	23	29
1991	24	NC
1992	25	23
1993	26	71

==== Team podiums ====
- 3 podiums – (3 RL)

No.	Season	Date	Location	Race	Level	Place	Teammates
1	1987–88	4 February 1988	Calgary, Canada	4 × 10 km Relay F	Olympic Games^{[1]}	3rd	Korunka / Benc / Švanda
2	1988–89	24 February 1989	Lahti, Finland	4 × 10 km Relay C/F	World Championships^{[1]}	3rd	Švanda / Petrásek / Korunka
3	1989–90	11 March 1990	Örnsköldsvik, Sweden	4 × 10 km Relay C/F	World Cup	3rd	Buchta / Švanda / Korunka

Note: ^{1} Until the 1999 World Championships and the 1994 Winter Olympics, World Championship and Olympic races were included in the World Cup scoring system.
