= Martin Petrásek =

Czech cross country skier (born 1983)

Personal information
- Nationality: Czech Republic
- Born: 26 March 1966 (age 60) Ostrov, Czechoslovakia

Sport
- Sport: Skiing

World Cup career
- Seasons: 6 – (1988–1989, 1991–1992, 1994, 1999)
- Indiv. starts: 23
- Indiv. podiums: 0
- Team starts: 1
- Team podiums: 1
- Team wins: 0
- Overall titles: 0 – (23rd in 1989)
Medal record
Men's cross-country skiing
Representing Czechoslovakia
World Championships
Bronze medal – third place	1989 Lahti	4 × 10 km relay

Martin Petrásek (born 26 March 1966) is a Czech former cross-country skier who competed from 1988 to 2001. He earned a bronze medal in the 4 × 10 km relay at the 1989 FIS Nordic World Ski Championships and also finished 10th in the 10 km event at the 1991 championships.

Petrásek's best individual finish at the Winter Olympics was 24th in the 30 km event in 1992. His only individual victory was in a 15 km event in Austria in 1993.

== Cross-country skiing results ==
All results are sourced from the International Ski Federation (FIS).

=== Olympic Games ===
Year	Age	10 km	15 km	Pursuit	30 km	50 km	4 × 10 km relay
1988	21	—N/a	43	—N/a	32	—	—
1992	25	66	—N/a	55	24	—	—
1994	27	71	—N/a	58	DNS	DNF	—

=== World Championships ===
- 1 medal – (1 bronze)

Year	Age	10 km	15 km classical	15 km freestyle	30 km	50 km	4 × 10 km relay
1989	22	—N/a	18	—	37	—	Bronze
1991	24	10	—N/a	—	41	—	8

=== World Cup ===
==== Season standings ====
Season	Age			
Season	Age	Overall	Long Distance	Sprint
1988	21	38	—N/a	—N/a
1989	22	23	—N/a	—N/a
1991	24	37	—N/a	—N/a
1992	25	NC	—N/a	—N/a
1994	27	NC	—N/a	—N/a
1999	32	NC	NC	—

==== Team podiums ====
- 1 podium – (1 RL)

No.	Season	Date	Location	Race	Level	Place	Teammates
1	1988–89	24 February 1989	Lahti, Finland	4 × 10 km Relay C/F	World Championships^{[1]}	3rd	Švanda / Nyč / Korunka

Note: ^{1} Until the 1999 World Championships, World Championship races were included in the World Cup scoring system.
