= Luboš Buchta =

Czech cross-country skier and Olympic athlete

Personal information
- Nationality: Czech Republic
- Born: 16 May 1967 (age 59) Nové Město na Moravě, Czechoslovak Socialist Republic

Sport
- Sport: Skiing
- Club: Dukla Liberec

World Cup career
- Seasons: 1989–1999
- Indiv. starts: 81
- Indiv. podiums: 1
- Indiv. wins: 0
- Team starts: 14
- Team podiums: 1
- Team wins: 0
- Overall titles: 0 – (17th in 1992)
- Discipline titles: 0

Lubomír Buchta (born 16 May 1967 in Nové Město na Moravě) is a Czech cross-country skier who competed from 1989 to 1999. Competing in three Winter Olympics, his best finish was seventh in the 4 × 10 km relay at Albertville in 1992 while his best individual finish was 13th twice (30 km: 1992, 50 km: 1998).

Buchta's best finish at the FIS Nordic World Ski Championships was fifth in the 10 km event at Val di Fiemme in 1991. His best World Cup finish was third in a 50 km event in Norway in 1992.

Buchta earned four FIS race victories up to 15 km from 1994 to 1997.

== Cross-country skiing results ==
All results are sourced from the International Ski Federation (FIS).

=== Olympic Games ===
Year	Age	10 km	Pursuit	30 km	50 km	4 × 10 km relay
1992	24	—	—	13	—	7
1994	26	26	24	—	20	8
1998	30	52	50	DNF	13	—

=== World Championships ===
Year	Age	10 km	15 km classical	15 km freestyle	Pursuit	30 km	50 km	4 × 10 km relay
1989	22	—N/a	26	—	—N/a	30	—	—
1991	24	5	—N/a	—	—N/a	9	—	—
1993	26	35	—N/a	—N/a	34	36	—	8
1995	28	20	—N/a	—N/a	31	27	—	9
1997	30	27	—N/a	—N/a	18	—	21	8

=== World Cup ===
==== Season standings ====
Season	Age			
Season	Age	Overall	Long Distance	Sprint
1989	21	43	—N/a	—N/a
1990	22	21	—N/a	—N/a
1991	23	21	—N/a	—N/a
1992	24	17	—N/a	—N/a
1993	25	43	—N/a	—N/a
1994	26	30	—N/a	—N/a
1995	27	40	—N/a	—N/a
1996	28	30	—N/a	—N/a
1997	29	46	67	47
1998	30	32	24	54
1999	31	NC	NC	—

==== Individual podiums ====
- 1 podium

No.	Season	Date	Location	Race	Level	Place
1	1991–92	14 March 1992	Vang, Norway	50 km Individual C	World Cup	3rd

==== Team podiums ====
- 1 podium – (1 RL)

No.	Season	Date	Location	Race	Level	Place	Teammates
1	1989–90	11 March 1990	Örnsköldsvik, Sweden	4 × 10 km Relay C/F	World Cup	3rd	Švanda / Nyč / Korunka

Olympic Games
Preceded by Pavel Benc	Flagbearer for the Czech Republic; Nagano 1998	Succeeded by Aleš Valenta
