= Chris Heberle =

Australian cross-country skier (born 1965)

Personal information
- Full name: Christopher John Heberle
- Nationality: Australian
- Born: 30 June 1965 (age 59); Tawonga South, Victoria, Australia

Sport
- Sport: Cross-country skiing

Chris Heberle (born 30 June 1965) is an Australian cross-country skier. He competed in the men's 15 kilometre classical event at the 1988 Winter Olympics. He is the co-founder, together with Klaas Sybranda, of Intouch Technology, which was instrumental in the early development of software for the ski industry.
