= Alyson Wreford =

British luger

Personal information
- Nationality: British
- Born: 19 February 1959 (age 66)

Sport
- Sport: Luge

Alyson Wreford (born 19 February 1959) is a British luger. She competed in the women's singles event at the 1988 Winter Olympics.
