= Livia Pelin =

Romanian luger

Personal information
- Nationality: Romanian
- Born: 29 January 1966 (age 59)

Sport
- Sport: Luge

Livia Pelin (born 29 January 1966) is a Romanian luger. She competed in the women's singles event at the 1988 Winter Olympics.
