= Oleg Yermolin =

Russian luger (born 1972)

Personal information
- Nationality: Russian
- Born: 18 February 1972 (age 53); Bratsk, Russia

Sport
- Sport: Luge

Oleg Yermolin (born 18 February 1972) is a Russian luger. He competed in the men's singles event at the 1992 Winter Olympics.
