= Andrew Wylie (skier) =

British cross-country skier (born 1961)

Personal information
- Nationality: British
- Born: 6 September 1961 (age 63); Cambridge, England

Sport
- Sport: Cross-country skiing

Andrew Wylie (born 6 September 1961) is a British cross-country skier. He competed in the men's relay event at the 1988 Winter Olympics.
