= List of flag bearers for the Czech Republic at the Olympics =

Czech Republic at the Olympics
- IOC code: CZE
- NOC: Czech Olympic Committee
- Website: www.olympic.cz (in Czech and English)
- Medals: Gold 34 Silver 35 Bronze 42 Total 111

Summer appearances
- 1996; 2000; 2004; 2008; 2012; 2016; 2020; 2024

Winter appearances
- 1994; 1998; 2002; 2006; 2010; 2014; 2018; 2022; 2026

Other related appearances
- Bohemia (1900–1912); Czechoslovakia (1924–1992)

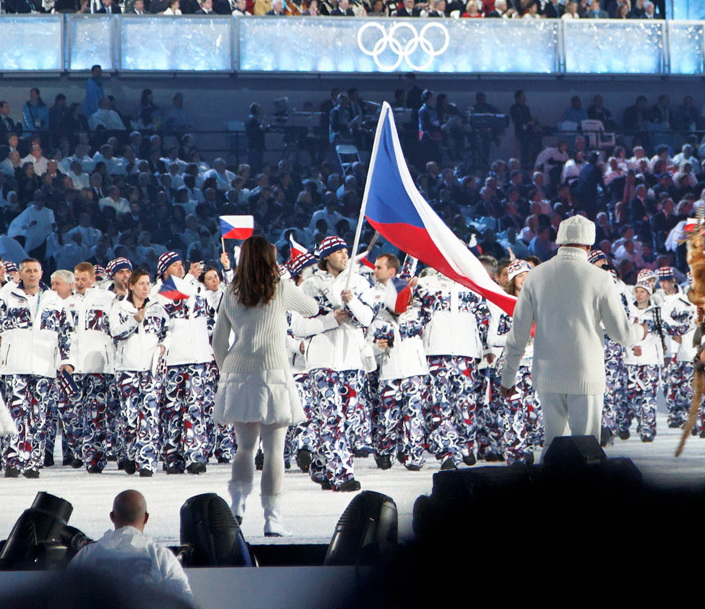
Jaromír Jágr, 2010 Winter Olympics national flag bearers

This is a list of flag bearers who have represented Czech Republic at the Olympics.

Flag bearers carry the national flag of their country at the opening ceremony of the Olympic Games.

| # | Event year | Season | Flag bearer | Sport |
|---|---|---|---|---|
| 1 | 1994 | Winter | Pavel Benc | Cross-country skiing |
| 2 | 1996 | Summer | Václav Chalupa | Rowing |
| 3 | 1998 | Winter | Luboš Buchta | Cross-country skiing |
| 4 | 2000 | Summer | Martin Doktor | Canoe sprint |
| 5 | 2002 | Winter | Aleš Valenta | Freestyle skiing |
| 6 | 2004 | Summer | Květoslav Svoboda | Swimming |
| 7 | 2006 | Winter | Martina Sáblíková | Speed skating |
| 8 | 2008 | Summer | Štěpánka Hilgertová | Canoe slalom |
| 9 | 2010 | Winter | Jaromír Jágr | Ice hockey |
| 10 | 2012 | Summer | Petr Koukal | Badminton |
| 11 | 2014 | Winter | Šárka Strachová | Alpine skiing |
| 12 | 2016 | Summer | Lukáš Krpálek | Judo |
| 13 | 2018 | Winter | Eva Samková | Snowboarding |
| 14 | 2020 | Summer | Petra Kvitová | Tennis |
| 14 | 2020 | Summer | Tomáš Satoranský | Basketball |
| 15 | 2022 | Winter | Alena Mills | Ice hockey |
| 15 | 2022 | Winter | Michal Březina | Figure skating |
| 16 | 2024 | Summer | Marie Horáčková | Archery |
| 16 | 2024 | Summer | Lukáš Krpálek | Judo |
| 17 | 2026 | Winter | Lucie Charvátová | Biathlon |
| 17 | 2026 | Winter | David Pastrňák | Ice hockey |

== See also ==
- Czech Republic at the Olympics
