= Pavel Benc =

Czech cross-country skier (born 1963)

Personal information
- Nationality: Czech Republic
- Born: 10 July 1963 (age 63) Jablonec nad Nisou, Czechoslovakia

Sport
- Sport: Skiing

World Cup career
- Seasons: 13 – (1984–1989, 1991–1997)
- Indiv. starts: 56
- Indiv. podiums: 0
- Team starts: 8
- Team podiums: 1
- Team wins: 0
- Overall titles: 0 – (25th in 1989, 1991)
- Discipline titles: 0
Medal record
Men's cross-country skiing
Representing Czechoslovakia
Olympic Games
Bronze medal – third place	1988 Calgary	4 × 10 km relay

Pavel Benc (Czech pronunciation: [ˈpavɛl ˈbɛnts]) (born 10 July 1963) is a Czech cross-country skier who raced from 1985 to 1997. He earned a bronze medal in the 4 × 10 km relay at the 1988 Winter Olympics. His best individual Winter Olympics finish was eight in the 50 km event during the 1992 Winter Olympics. Benc's best finish was fifth in the 50 km event at the 1991 FIS Nordic World Ski Championships. His best overall finish was second in a 15 km event in 1993.

== Cross-country skiing results ==
All results are sourced from the International Ski Federation (FIS).

=== Olympic Games ===
- 1 medal – (1 bronze)

Year	Age	10 km	15 km	Pursuit	30 km	50 km	4 × 10 km relay
1984	20	—N/a	46	—N/a	34	—	—
1988	24	—N/a	41	—N/a	—	27	Bronze
1992	28	41	—N/a	33	—	8	7
1994	30	65	—N/a	36	25	DNS	8

=== World Championships ===
Year	Age	10 km	15 km classical	15 km freestyle	Pursuit	30 km	50 km	4 × 10 km relay
1985	21	—N/a	—N/a	33	—N/a	—	16	—
1987	23	—N/a	21	—N/a	—N/a	—	—	4
1989	25	—N/a	—	21	—N/a	34	DNF	—
1991	27	—	—N/a	32	—N/a	28	5	—
1993	29	—	—N/a	—N/a	—	32	7	8
1995	31	—	—N/a	—N/a	—	36	14	9

=== World Cup ===
==== Season standings ====
Season	Age			
Season	Age	Overall	Long Distance	Sprint
1984	20	NC	—N/a	—N/a
1985	21	30	—N/a	—N/a
1986	22	NC	—N/a	—N/a
1987	23	35	—N/a	—N/a
1988	24	NC	—N/a	—N/a
1989	25	25	—N/a	—N/a
1991	27	25	—N/a	—N/a
1992	28	36	—N/a	—N/a
1993	29	27	—N/a	—N/a
1994	30	71	—N/a	—N/a
1995	31	61	—N/a	—N/a
1996	32	NC	—N/a	—N/a
1997	33	NC	NC	—

==== Team podiums ====
- 1 podium – (1 RL)

No.	Season	Date	Location	Race	Level	Place	Teammates
1	1987–88	4 February 1988	Calgary, Canada	4 × 10 km Relay F	Olympic Games^{[1]}	3rd	Nyč / Korunka / Švanda

Note: ^{1} Until the 1994 Winter Olympics, Olympic races were included in the World Cup scoring system.

Olympic Games
Preceded by -	Flagbearer for the Czech Republic; Lillehammer 1994	Succeeded by Luboš Buchta
