= Ian Whitehead (luger) =

British luger (born 1963)

Personal information
- Nationality: British
- Born: 7 January 1963 (age 63) Clatterbridge, England

Sport
- Sport: Luge

Ian Whitehead (born 7 January 1963) is a British luger. He competed in the men's singles event at the 1992 Winter Olympics.
