= Mina Tanaka (luger) =

Japanese luger (born 1971)

Personal information
- Nationality: Japanese
- Born: 6 April 1971 (age 53); Hokkaido, Japan

Sport
- Sport: Luge

Mina Tanaka (田中 三奈, Tanaka Mina, born 6 April 1971) is a Japanese luger. She competed in the women's singles event at the 1988 Winter Olympics.
