= Robert Pipkins =

American luger (born 1973)

Personal information
- Nationality: American
- Born: February 23, 1973 (age 52); Buffalo, New York, United States

Sport
- Sport: Luge

Robert Pipkins (born February 23, 1973) is an American former luger. He competed at the 1992 Winter Olympics and the 1994 Winter Olympics. He was the first African-American to represent the United States in the luge at an international level.

== Biography ==
Pipkins was born in Buffalo, New York in 1973, and attended Drexel University in Philadelphia. He took up luge in 1987, after his mother read about the sport and encouraged him to take part in the sport. In 1992, Pipkins became the first American luger to win an international race, when he finished first at the World Junior Championships. He was on the US Luge Team from 1991 to 1998, winning four back-to-back titles during that time.

At the 1992 Winter Olympics in Albertville, Pipkins competed in the men's singles event, finishing in 21st place. Two years later, at the 1994 Winter Olympics in Lillehammer, he competed in the same event, this time finishing in 16th place. He also tried to qualify for the 2002 Winter Olympics.

In 1993 in Oberhof, Germany, Pipkins was attacked by a group of neo-Nazi skinheads. Fellow luger Duncan Kennedy came to Pipkins rescue, helping him to get away. Following the attack, the United States Olympic Committee declared that Germany was "dangerous". The Mayor of Oberhof also sent an apology to Bill Clinton, with those involved handed prison sentences.
