= Václav Korunka =

Czech cross country skier

Personal information
- Nationality: Czech Republic
- Born: 25 December 1965 (age 60) Jilemnice, Czechoslovakia

Sport
- Sport: Skiing
- Club: Dukla Liberec

World Cup career
- Seasons: 12 – (1988–1999)
- Indiv. starts: 73
- Indiv. podiums: 3
- Indiv. wins: 0
- Team starts: 18
- Team podiums: 3
- Team wins: 0
- Overall titles: 0 – (11th in 1993)
- Discipline titles: 0
Medal record
Men's cross-country skiing
Representing Czechoslovakia
Olympic Games
Bronze medal – third place	1988 Calgary	4 × 10 km relay
World Championships
Bronze medal – third place	1989 Lahti	4 × 10 km relay

Václav Korunka (Czech pronunciation: [ˈvaːtslaf ˈkoruŋka]; born 25 December 1965) is a Czech former cross-country skier who competed from 1988 to 1999. He earned a bronze medal in the 4 × 10 km relay at the 1988 Winter Olympics in Calgary while his best individual Winter Olympics finish was a 13th in the 50 km event in 1992.

Korunka also won a bronze medal in the 4 × 10 km relay at the 1989 FIS Nordic World Ski Championships. His best individual finish at the World Championships was an eight in the 15 km event in those same championships.

Korunka won three FIS races in his career as well.

== Cross-country skiing results ==
All results are sourced from the International Ski Federation (FIS).

=== Olympic Games ===
- 1 medal – (1 bronze)

Year	Age	10 km	15 km	Pursuit	30 km	50 km	4 × 10 km relay
1988	22	—N/a	28	—N/a	—	—	Bronze
1992	26	17	—N/a	14	—	13	7
1994	28	59	—N/a	37	—	—	8

=== World Championships ===
- 1 medal – (1 bronze)

Year	Age	10 km	15 km classical	15 km freestyle	Pursuit	30 km	50 km	4 × 10 km relay
1989	23	—N/a	8	14	—N/a	—	DNF	Bronze
1991	25	13	—N/a	25	—N/a	—	19	8
1993	27	23	—N/a	—N/a	16	—	9	8
1995	29	30	—N/a	—N/a	38	—	24	9
1997	31	—	—N/a	—N/a	—	21	38	8
1999	33	32	—N/a	—N/a	45	42	—	8

=== World Cup ===
==== Season standings ====
Season	Age			
Season	Age	Overall	Long Distance	Sprint
1988	22	38	—N/a	—N/a
1989	23	18	—N/a	—N/a
1990	24	32	—N/a	—N/a
1991	25	16	—N/a	—N/a
1992	26	36	—N/a	—N/a
1993	27	11	—N/a	—N/a
1994	28	56	—N/a	—N/a
1995	29	65	—N/a	—N/a
1996	30	31	—N/a	—N/a
1997	31	57	57	63
1998	32	NC	NC	—
1999	33	106	NC	NC

==== Individual podiums ====
- 3 podiums

No.	Season	Date	Location	Race	Level	Place
1	1990–91	5 January 1991	Minsk, Soviet Union	15 km Individual F	World Cup	3rd
2	1992–93	12 December 1992	Ramsau, Austria	10 km Individual F	World Cup	3rd
3	1992–93	7 March 1993	Lahti, Finland	30 km Individual F	World Cup	3rd

==== Team podiums ====
- 3 podiums – (3 RL)

No.	Season	Date	Location	Race	Level	Place	Teammates
1	1987–88	4 February 1988	Calgary, Canada	4 × 10 km Relay F	Olympic Games^{[1]}	3rd	Nyč / Benc / Švanda
2	1988–89	24 February 1989	Lahti, Finland	4 × 10 km Relay C/F	World Championships^{[1]}	3rd	Švanda / Petrásek / Nyč
3	1989–90	11 March 1990	Örnsköldsvik, Sweden	4 × 10 km Relay C/F	World Cup	3rd	Švanda / Buchta / Nyč

Note: ^{1} Until the 1999 World Championships and the 1994 Winter Olympics, World Championship and Olympic races were included in the World Cup scoring system.
