= Simoneta Racheva =

Bulgarian luger

Personal information
- Nationality: Bulgarian
- Born: 1 March 1961 (age 64)

Sport
- Sport: Luge

Simoneta Racheva (Bulgarian: Симонета Рачева was born 1 March 1961) is a Bulgarian luger. She competed in the women's singles event at the 1988 Winter Olympics.
