= Ladislav Švanda =

Czech cross-country skier (born 1983)

Personal information
- Nationality: Czech Republic
- Born: 14 February 1959 (age 67) Prague, Czechoslovakia

Sport
- Sport: Skiing

World Cup career
- Seasons: 8 – (1982–1983, 1985–1990)
- Indiv. starts: 21
- Indiv. podiums: 0
- Team starts: 5
- Team podiums: 3
- Team wins: 0
- Overall titles: 0 – (25th in 1985)
Medal record
Men's cross-country skiing
Representing Czechoslovakia
Olympic Games
Bronze medal – third place	1988 Calgary	4 × 10 km relay
World Championships
Bronze medal – third place	1989 Lahti	4 × 10 km relay

Ladislav Švanda (born 14 February 1959) is a Czech former cross-country skier who competed for Czechoslovakia from 1982 to 1990. He earned a bronze medal in the 4 × 10 km relay at the 1988 Winter Olympics in Calgary while his best individual Winter Olympics finish was a 15th in the 50 km event at those same games.

Švanda also won a bronze medal in the 4 × 10 km relay at the 1989 FIS Nordic World Ski Championships. His best individual finish at the Nordic skiing World Championships was ninth in the 50 km event in 1987.

Švanda's best career World Cup finish was seventh twice (1985, 1986).

== Cross-country skiing results ==
All results are sourced from the International Ski Federation (FIS).

=== Olympic Games ===
- 1 medal – (1 bronze)

Year	Age	15 km	30 km	50 km	4 × 10 km relay
1988	29	19	17	15	Bronze

=== World Championships ===
- 1 medal – (1 bronze)

Year	Age	10 km	15 km classical	15 km freestyle	30 km	50 km	4 × 10 km relay
1987	28	—N/a	22	—N/a	13	9	4
1989	30	—N/a	—	17	17	DNF	Bronze
1991	32	—	—N/a	—	36	36	8

=== World Cup ===
==== Season standings ====
Season	Age	Overall
1982	23	61
1983	24	56
1985	26	25
1986	27	32
1987	28	39
1988	29	28
1989	30	NC
1990	31	43

==== Team podiums ====
- 3 podiums – (3 RL)

No.	Season	Date	Location	Race	Level	Place	Teammates
1	1987–88	4 February 1988	Calgary, Canada	4 × 10 km Relay F	Olympic Games^{[1]}	3rd	Nyč / Korunka / Benc
2	1988–89	24 February 1989	Lahti, Finland	4 × 10 km Relay C/F	World Championships^{[1]}	3rd	Petrásek / Nyč / Korunka
3	1989–90	11 March 1990	Örnsköldsvik, Sweden	4 × 10 km Relay C/F	World Cup	3rd	Buchta / Nyč / Korunka

Note: ^{1} Until the 1999 World Championships and the 1994 Winter Olympics, World Championship and Olympic races were included in the World Cup scoring system.
