= Karine Laurent Philippot =

French cross-country skier (born 1974)

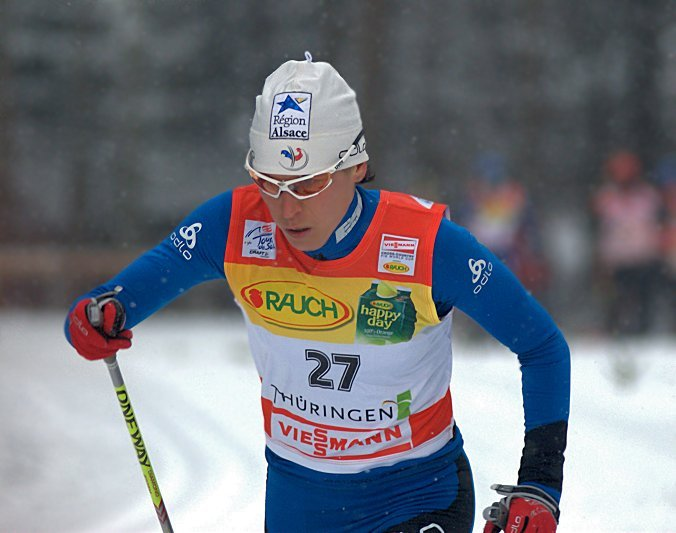
- Laurent Philippot in 2010

Personal information
- Nationality: France
- Born: 29 October 1974 (age 51) Mulhouse, France

Sport
- Sport: Skiing

World Cup career
- Seasons: 15 – (1995–2002, 2004–2010)
- Indiv. starts: 174
- Indiv. podiums: 2
- Indiv. wins: 0
- Team starts: 35
- Team podiums: 3
- Team wins: 0
- Overall titles: 0 – (26th in 2000)
- Discipline titles: 0

Karine Laurent Philippot (French: [kaʁin loʁɑ̃ filipɔ]; born 29 October 1974 in Mulhouse as Karine Philippot) is a French cross-country skier and non-commissioned officer who has competed since 1994. Her best World Cup finish was second in a 10 km event in China in 2007.

Laurent Philippot also competed in four Winter Olympics, earning her best finish of sixth in the 4 × 5 km relay at Vancouver in 2010. Her best finish at the FIS Nordic World Ski Championships was sixth in the team sprint event at Oberstdorf in 2005.

== Cross-country skiing results ==
All results are sourced from the International Ski Federation (FIS).

=== Olympic Games ===
Year	Age	5 km	10 km	15 km	Pursuit	30 km	Sprint	4 × 5 km relay	Team sprint
1998	23	52	—N/a	—	33	22	—N/a	11	—N/a
2002	27	—N/a	—	8	19	—	—	—	—N/a
2006	31	—N/a	—	—N/a	20	11	—	9	—
2010	35	—N/a	26	—N/a	19	10	—	6	9

=== World Championships ===
Year	Age	5 km	10 km	15 km	Pursuit	30 km	Sprint	4 × 5 km relay	Team sprint
1995	20	66	—N/a	—	50	31	—N/a	9	—N/a
1997	22	68	—N/a	17	45	—	—N/a	7	—N/a
1999	24	—	—N/a	—	—	—	—N/a	—	—N/a
2001	26	—N/a	—	—	12	CNX^{[a]}	25	—	—N/a
2005	30	—N/a	15	—N/a	—	—	—	9	6
2007	32	—N/a	38	—N/a	36	DNS	—	—	—
2009	34	—N/a	DNS	—N/a	18	11	—	8	—

a. ^{1} Cancelled due to extremely cold weather.

=== World Cup ===
==== Season standings ====
Season	Age	Discipline standings					Ski Tour standings	
Season	Age	Overall	Distance	Long Distance	Middle Distance	Sprint	Tour de Ski	World Cup Final
1995	20	NC	—N/a	—N/a	—N/a	—N/a	—N/a	—N/a
1996	21	NC	—N/a	—N/a	—N/a	—N/a	—N/a	—N/a
1997	22	37	—N/a	34	—N/a	40	—N/a	—N/a
1998	23	43	—N/a	31	—N/a	54	—N/a	—N/a
1999	24	63	—N/a	42	—N/a	NC	—N/a	—N/a
2000	25	26	—N/a	36	25	20	—N/a	—N/a
2001	26	32	—N/a	—N/a	—N/a	45	—N/a	—N/a
2002	27	29	—N/a	—N/a	—N/a	64	—N/a	—N/a
2004	29	67	49	—N/a	—N/a	NC	—N/a	—N/a
2005	30	34	21	—N/a	—N/a	NC	—N/a	—N/a
2006	31	34	23	—N/a	—N/a	—	—N/a	—N/a
2007	32	18	16	—N/a	—N/a	47	12	—N/a
2008	33	62	37	—N/a	—N/a	77	31	32
2009	34	29	20	—N/a	—N/a	NC	—	18
2010	35	29	25	—N/a	—N/a	71	15	10

==== Individual podiums ====
- 2 podiums – (2 WC)

No.	Season	Date	Location	Race	Level	Place
1	2004–05	6 March 2005	Lahti, Finland	10 km Individual F	World Cup	3rd
2	2006–07	16 February 2007	Changchun, China	10 km Individual F	World Cup	2nd

==== Team podiums ====
- 3 podiums – (3 TS)

No.	Season	Date	Location	Race	Level	Place	Teammate
1	1997–98	10 March 1998	Falun, Sweden	6 × 1.6 km Team Sprint F	World Cup	2nd	Villeneuve
2	1998–99	8 March 1999	Vantaa, Finland	Team Sprint F	World Cup	2nd	Vaxelaire-Pierrel
3	2001–02	2 March 2002	Lahti, Finland	4 × 1.5 km Team Sprint F	World Cup	3rd	Belmondo
