= Ludovic Mathieu =

French speed skater (born 1976)

Personal information
- Nationality: French
- Born: 25 September 1976 (age 48); Thionville, France

Sport
- Sport: Short track speed skating

Ludovic Mathieu (born 25 September 1976) is a French short track speed skater. He competed at the 1998 Winter Olympics and the 2002 Winter Olympics.
