= Pierre Schmitt =

French ice hockey player

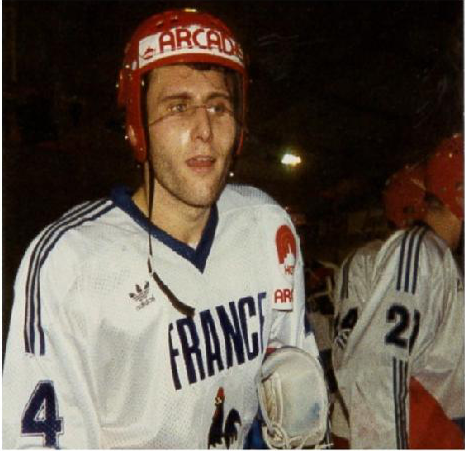

Personal information
- Nationality: French
- Born: 19 December 1965 (age 59)

Sport
- Sport: Ice hockey

Pierre Schmitt (born 19 December 1965) is a French ice hockey player. He competed in the men's tournament at the 1988 Winter Olympics.
