= Andreas Heymann =

French biathlete (born 1966)

Personal information
- Nationality: French
- Born: 26 December 1966 (age 58); Breitenbrunn, East Germany

Sport
- Sport: Biathlon

Andreas Heymann (born 26 December 1966) is a French biathlete. He competed in the men's 20 km individual event at the 1998 Winter Olympics.
