= Stéphane Lessard =

French ice hockey player

Personal information
- Nationality: French
- Born: 2 February 1962 (age 63)

Sport
- Sport: Ice hockey

Stéphane Lessard (born 2 February 1962) is a French ice hockey player. He competed in the men's tournament at the 1988 Winter Olympics.
