= Benjamin Agnel =

French ice hockey player

- Born: 29 November 1973 (age 52) Ouagadougou, Upper Volta
- Height: 5 ft 9 in (175 cm)
- Weight: 165 lb (75 kg; 11 st 11 lb)
- Position: Center
- Shot: Left
- Played for: Brûleurs de Loups; Dragons de Rouen; Bergen IK; HC Falcons Brixen/Bressanone; Real Torino HC; LHC Les Lions; Chevaliers du lac d'Annecy
- National team: France
- Playing career: 1991–2008

Benjamin Agnel (born 29 November 1973) is a French former ice hockey player. He competed in the 1994 Winter Olympics.
