= Jean-Christophe Lerondeau =

French ice hockey player

Personal information
- Nationality: French
- Born: 27 June 1963 (age 61); Juvisy-sur-Orge, France

Sport
- Sport: Ice hockey

Jean-Christophe Lerondeau (born 27 June 1963) is a French ice hockey player. He competed in the men's tournament at the 1988 Winter Olympics.
