= Eduard Burmistrov =

Russian luger (born 1968)

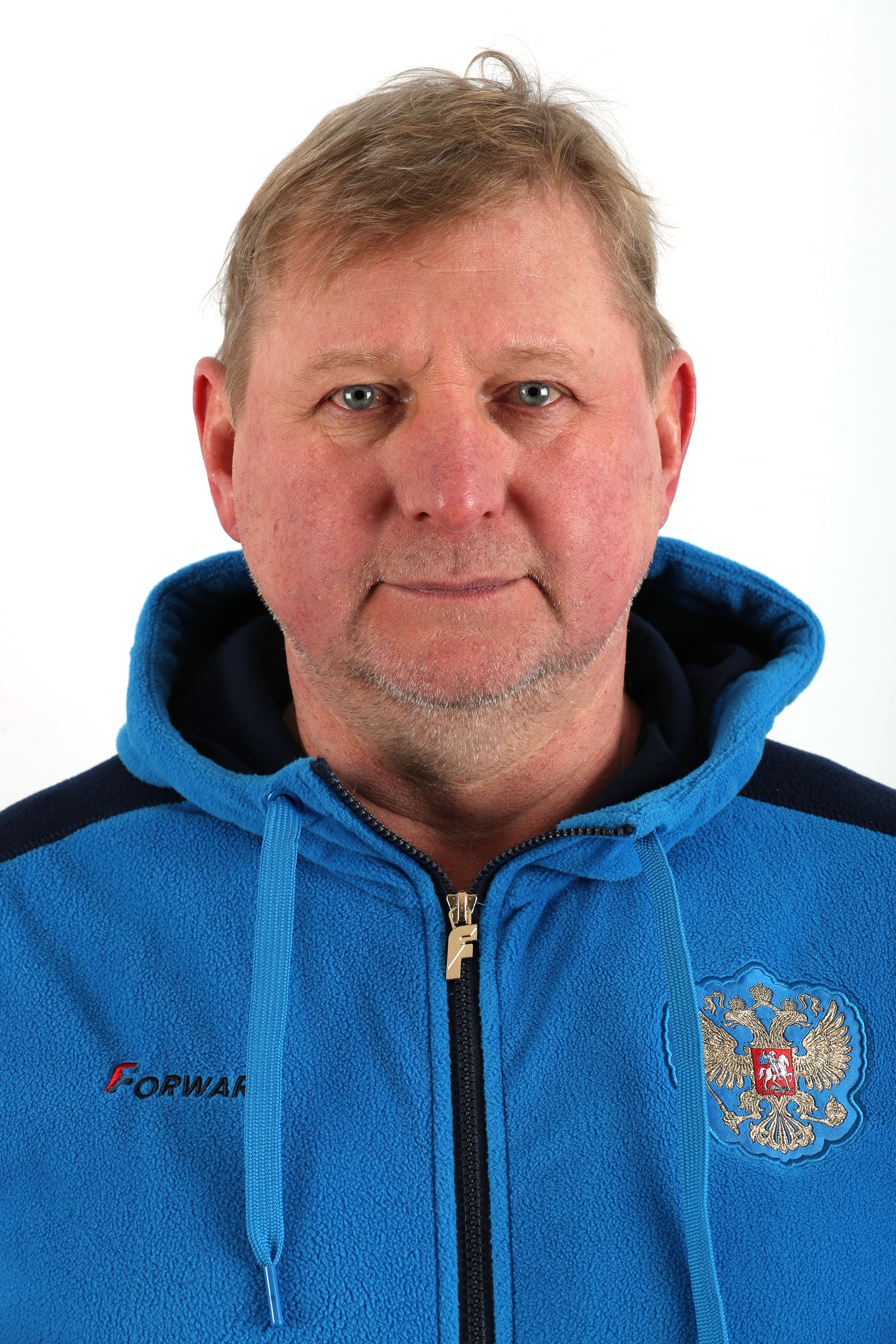
- Eduard Burmistrov in 2018

Personal information
- Nationality: Russian
- Born: 24 February 1968 (age 57); Bratsk, Russia

Sport
- Sport: Luge

Eduard Burmistrov (born 24 February 1968) is a Russian luger. He competed at the 1992 Winter Olympics and the 1994 Winter Olympics.
