= Olivier Fraise =

French luger (born 1970)

Personal information
- Nationality: French
- Born: 14 September 1970 (age 54); Épinal, France

Sport
- Sport: Luge

Olivier Fraise (born 14 September 1970) is a French luger. He competed in the men's singles event at the 1992 Winter Olympics.
