= Harald Rolfsen =

Norwegian luger (born 1969)

Personal information
- Born: 3 May 1969 (age 56); Oslo, Norway

Sport
- Sport: Luge

Harald Christopher Rolfsen (born 3 May 1969) is a Norwegian luger, born in Oslo. He competed at the 1992 and 1994 Winter Olympics.

He won seven national titles in single luge, in 1994, 1995, 2000, 2002, 2003, 2004 and 2005.

== Early life and education ==
Harald Rolfsen was born on May 3, 1969 in Oslo. He began to actively engage in luge in early childhood, trained at the local sports club "Akephoreninge". He made his international debut at the age of seventeen, when he attended the Junior World Championships in Königssee, Germany, and took thirtieth place among single sleds. In 1988, he competed at the World Youth Championships in Valdaora, Italy, where he was twenty-first in singles and twelfth in doubles. Two years later, in singles, he finished twenty-ninth at the senior European Championships in Igls, Austria, and thirty-fourth at the World Championships in Calgary, Canada. A year later, he went to the World Championships in the German city of Winterberg, where he showed the twenty-second time on a single sled and the twenty-fourth time on a two-seater sled.
