= Irina Kusakina =

Soviet luger (born 1965)

Medal record

Luge

World Championships
Bronze medal – third place	1989 Winterberg	Mixed team

Irina Kusakina (born 5 June 1965) is a Soviet luger who competed during the late 1980s. She won a bronze in the mixed team event at the 1989 FIL World Luge Championships in Winterberg, West Germany. She also competed at the 1988 Winter Olympics.
