= Frédéric Bertrand =

French luger (born 1971)

Personal information
- Nationality: French
- Born: 24 July 1971 (age 53); Hyères, France

Sport
- Sport: Luge

Frédéric Bertrand (born 24 July 1971) is a French luger. He competed in the men's singles and doubles events at the 1992 Winter Olympics.
