= Yves Boyer =

French luger (born 1965)

Personal information
- Nationality: French
- Born: 19 June 1965 (age 59); Albertville, France

Sport
- Sport: Luge

Yves Boyer (born 19 June 1965) is a French luger. He competed in the men's singles and doubles events at the 1992 Winter Olympics.
