= Veronika Oberhuber =

Italian luger

Medal record

Luge

World Championships
| Gold medal – first place | 1989 Winterberg | Mixed team |

Veronika Oberhuber (born 1 February 1967) is an Italian luger who has competed during the 1980s. She won the gold medal in the mixed team event at the 1989 FIL World Luge Championships in Winterberg, West Germany. Oberhuber competed in two Winter Olympics, earning her beat finish of 11th at Sarajevo in 1984.
