= Thierry Lamberton =

French speed skater (born 1966)

Thierry Dominique Lamberton (born 18 October 1966) is a former ice speed skater from France, who represented his native country at the 1992 Winter Olympics in Albertville, France.
