= Annick Vaxelaire-Pierrel =

French cross-country skier (born 1974)

Personal information
- Nationality: France
- Born: 19 July 1974 (age 52) Remiremont, France

Sport
- Sport: Skiing

World Cup career
- Seasons: 9 – (1995–2003)
- Indiv. starts: 87
- Indiv. podiums: 0
- Team starts: 16
- Team podiums: 1
- Team wins: 0
- Overall titles: 0 – (37th in 1998, 1999)
- Discipline titles: 0

Annick Vaxelaire-Pierrel (born 19 July 1974) is a French cross-country skier. She competed at the 1998 Winter Olympics and the 2002 Winter Olympics.

== Cross-country skiing results ==
All results are sourced from the International Ski Federation (FIS).

=== Olympic Games ===
Year	Age	5 km	10 km	15 km	Pursuit	30 km	Sprint	4 × 5 km relay
1998	23	49	—N/a	45	37	DNS	—N/a	11
2002	27	—N/a	—	24	37	—	—	—

=== World Championships ===
Year	Age	5 km	10 km	15 km	Pursuit	30 km	Sprint	4 × 5 km relay
1995	20	38	—N/a	30	37	25	—N/a	9
1997	22	54	—N/a	18	29	—	—N/a	7
1999	24	22	—N/a	DNF	22	29	—N/a	9
2001	26	—N/a	—	45	42	CNX^{[a]}	41	—
2003	28	—N/a	—	—	26	32	—	9

a. ^{1} Cancelled due to extremely cold weather.

=== World Cup ===
==== Season standings ====
Season	Age					
Season	Age	Overall	Distance	Long Distance	Middle Distance	Sprint
1995	20	65	—N/a	—N/a	—N/a	—N/a
1996	21	41	—N/a	—N/a	—N/a	—N/a
1997	22	25	—N/a	20	—N/a	19
1998	23	37	—N/a	36	—N/a	36
1999	24	37	—N/a	61	—N/a	40
2000	25	NC	—N/a	NC	NC	NC
2001	26	72	—N/a	—N/a	—N/a	49
2002	27	93	—N/a	—N/a	—N/a	NC
2003	28	96	—N/a	—N/a	—N/a	NC

==== Team podiums ====
- 1 podium – (1 TS)

No.	Season	Date	Location	Race	Level	Place	Teammate
1	1998–99	8 March 1999	Vantaa, Finland	Team Sprint F	World Cup	2nd	Laurent Philippot
