= Jean-Pierre Bohard =

French Nordic combined skier

Jean-Pierre Bohard (born February 2, 1969) was a French Nordic combined skier who competed from 1987 to 1989. He finished eighth in the 3 x 10 km team event at the 1988 Winter Olympics in Calgary.

Bohard's best World Cup finish was 14th in a 15 km individual event in France in 1987.
