= Michaël Babin =

French ice hockey player

Personal information
- Nationality: French
- Born: 20 March 1970 (age 55); Caen, France

Sport
- Sport: Ice hockey

Michaël Babin (born 20 March 1970) is a French ice hockey player. He competed in the men's tournament at the 1992 Winter Olympics.
