= Christophe Moyon =

French ice hockey player

Personal information
- Nationality: French
- Born: 12 May 1963 (age 61); Albert, France

Sport
- Sport: Ice hockey

Christophe Moyon (born 12 May 1963) is a French ice hockey player. He competed in the men's tournament at the 1994 Winter Olympics.
