= Laurence Bonici =

French luger (born 1957)

Personal information
- Nationality: French
- Born: 24 September 1957 (age 67); Villard-de-Lans, France

Sport
- Sport: Luge

Laurence Bonici (born 24 September 1957) is a French luger. She competed in the women's singles event at the 1988 Winter Olympics.
