= Ron Howden (skier) =

British cross-country skier (born 1967)

Ronald Howden (born 23 March 1967 in Toronto) competed for team Britain at the 1988 Winter Olympics. He competed in the Men's 15 km Classical Nordic skiing, placing 73 out 92.
