= Christophe Flacher =

French bobsledder

Christophe Flacher (born 5 June 1966 in Bourgoin-Jallieu) is a French bobsledder who competed in the early 1990s. He competed in two Winter Olympics. His best finish was eighth in the four-man event at Albertville in 1992.
