= Cédric Vallet =

French cross-country skier (born 1971)

Personal information
- Nationality: French
- Born: 22 September 1971 (age 53); Megève, France

Sport
- Sport: Cross-country skiing

Cédric Vallet (born 22 September 1971) is a French cross-country skier. He competed at the 1992 Winter Olympics and the 1994 Winter Olympics.
