= Steve Delaup =

French ski jumper

Steve Delaup (born 7 August 1972 in Porto Vecchio) was a French ski jumper who competed from 1991 to 1995. He competed at the 1992 Winter Olympics and the 1994 Winter Olympics.

Delaup's best individual finish at the FIS Nordic World Ski Championships was eighth in the large hill event at Falun in 1993.

Delaup's best World Cup career finish was third in Japan in 1992.
