= Francis Repellin =

French Nordic combined skier (born 1969)

Medal record

Men's Nordic combined

World Championships
Silver medal – second place	1991 Val di Fiemme	3 x 10 km team

Francis Repellin (born 4 March 1969) is a French Nordic combined skier who competed from 1987 to 1993. He won a silver medal in the 3 x 10 km team event at the 1991 FIS Nordic World Ski Championships in Val di Fiemme.

Repellin's best individual finish was 2nd twice ([1988] - Austria, 1989 - Norway).

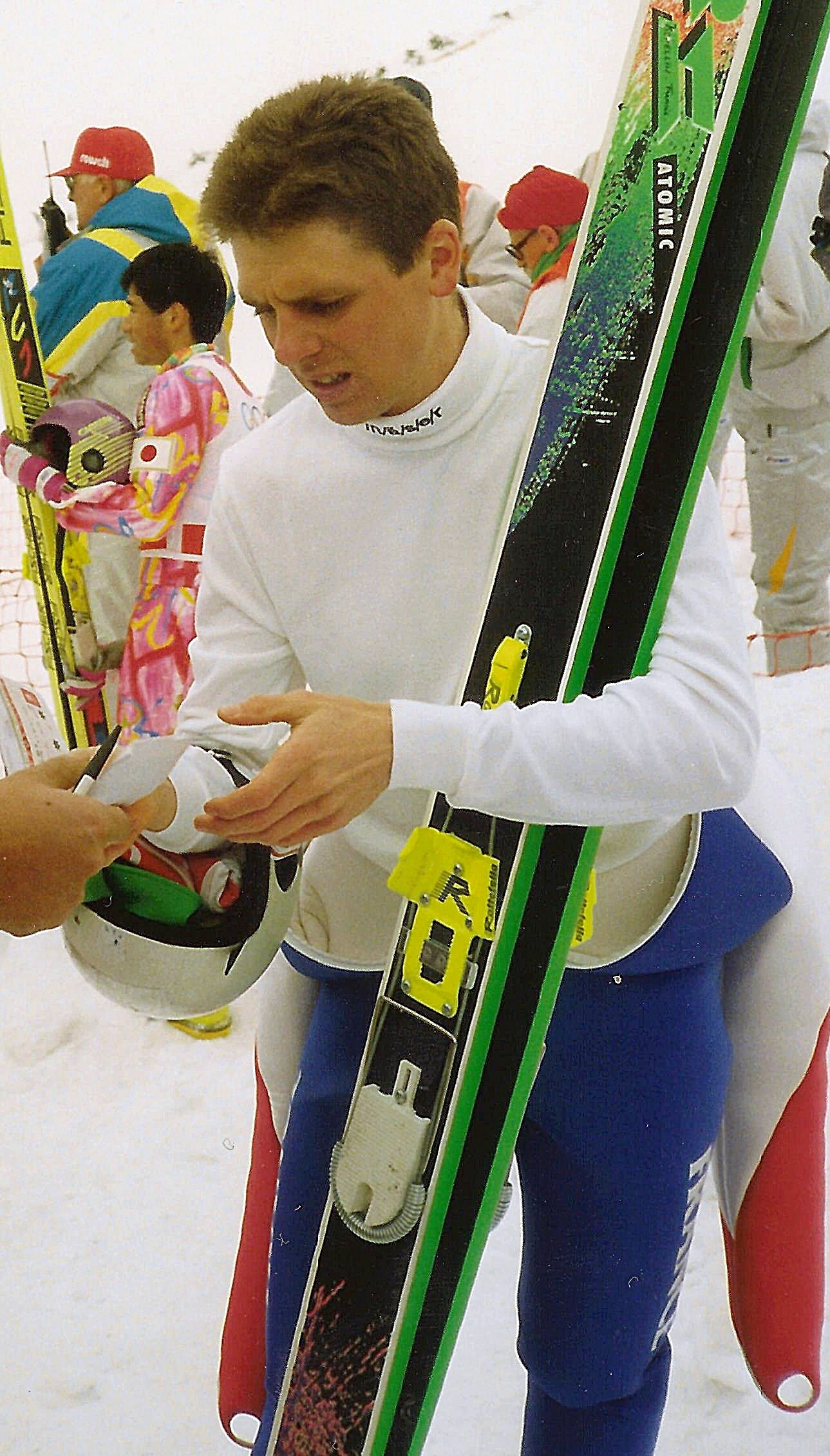
Francis Repellin during the J.O. d'Alberville, February 17, 1992
