= Bruno Saunier =

French ice hockey player

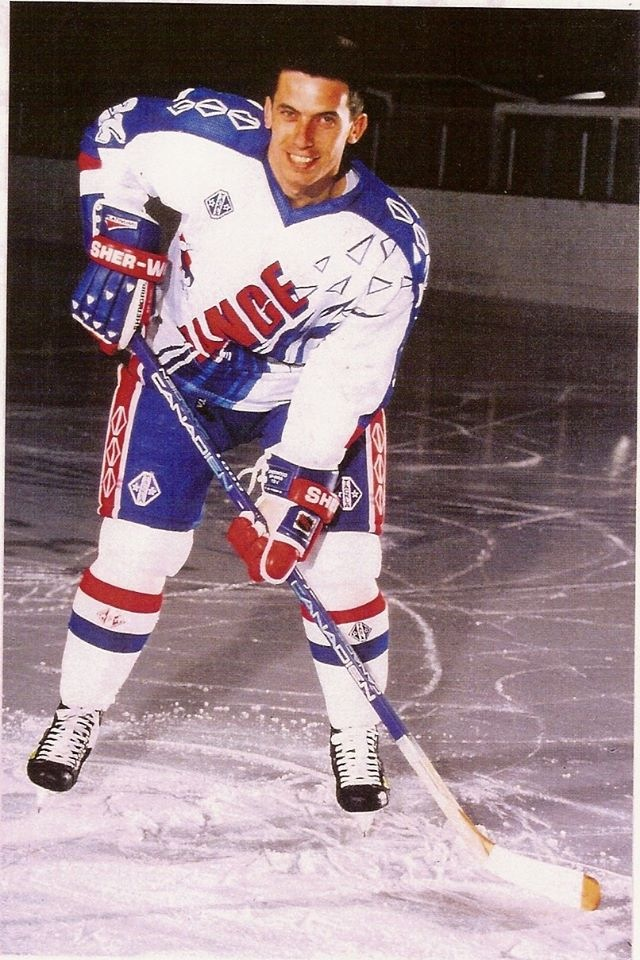

Personal information
- Nationality: French
- Born: 19 July 1963 (age 62); Gap, France

Sport
- Sport: Ice hockey

Bruno Saunier (born 19 July 1963) is a French ice hockey player. He competed in the men's tournaments at the 1992 Winter Olympics and the 1994 Winter Olympics.
