= Jean-Luc Thomas =

French cross-country skier (born 1963)

Personal information
- Nationality: French
- Born: 6 February 1963 (age 62)

Sport
- Sport: Cross-country skiing

Jean-Luc Thomas (born 6 February 1963) is a French cross-country skier. He competed in the men's 15 kilometre classical event at the 1988 Winter Olympics.
