= Michel Leblanc (ice hockey) =

French ice hockey player

Personal information
- Nationality: French
- Born: 17 December 1959 (age 65); Trois-Rivières, Quebec, Canada

Sport
- Sport: Ice hockey

Michel Leblanc (born 17 December 1959) is a Canadian-born French former ice hockey player. He competed in the men's tournaments at the 1988 Winter Olympics and the 1992 Winter Olympics for France.
