= Philippe Tanchon =

French bobsledder

Personal information
- Nationality: French
- Born: 23 January 1963 (age 62); Douai, France

Sport
- Sport: Bobsleigh

Philippe Tanchon (born 23 January 1963) is a retired French bobsledder. He competed at the 1992 Winter Olympics and the 1994 Winter Olympics. At the 1992 Winter Olympics, Tanchon placed 17th in the two-men competition, and at the 1994 Winter Olympics, he placed 23rd in the two-men competition, and 16th in the four-men competition.
