= Gabriel Fourmigué =

French bobsledder (1967–2022)

Gabriel Fourmigué (23 March 1967, Condom, Gers – 4 July 2022) was a French bobsledder who competed in the early 1990s. Competing in two Winter Olympics, he earned his best finish of eighth in the four-man event at Albertville in 1992. He was murdered along with a 32 year-old French teacher on 4 July 2022 in Pouyastruc, Hautes-Pyrénées.
