= Stéphane Azambre =

French cross-country skier and biathlete

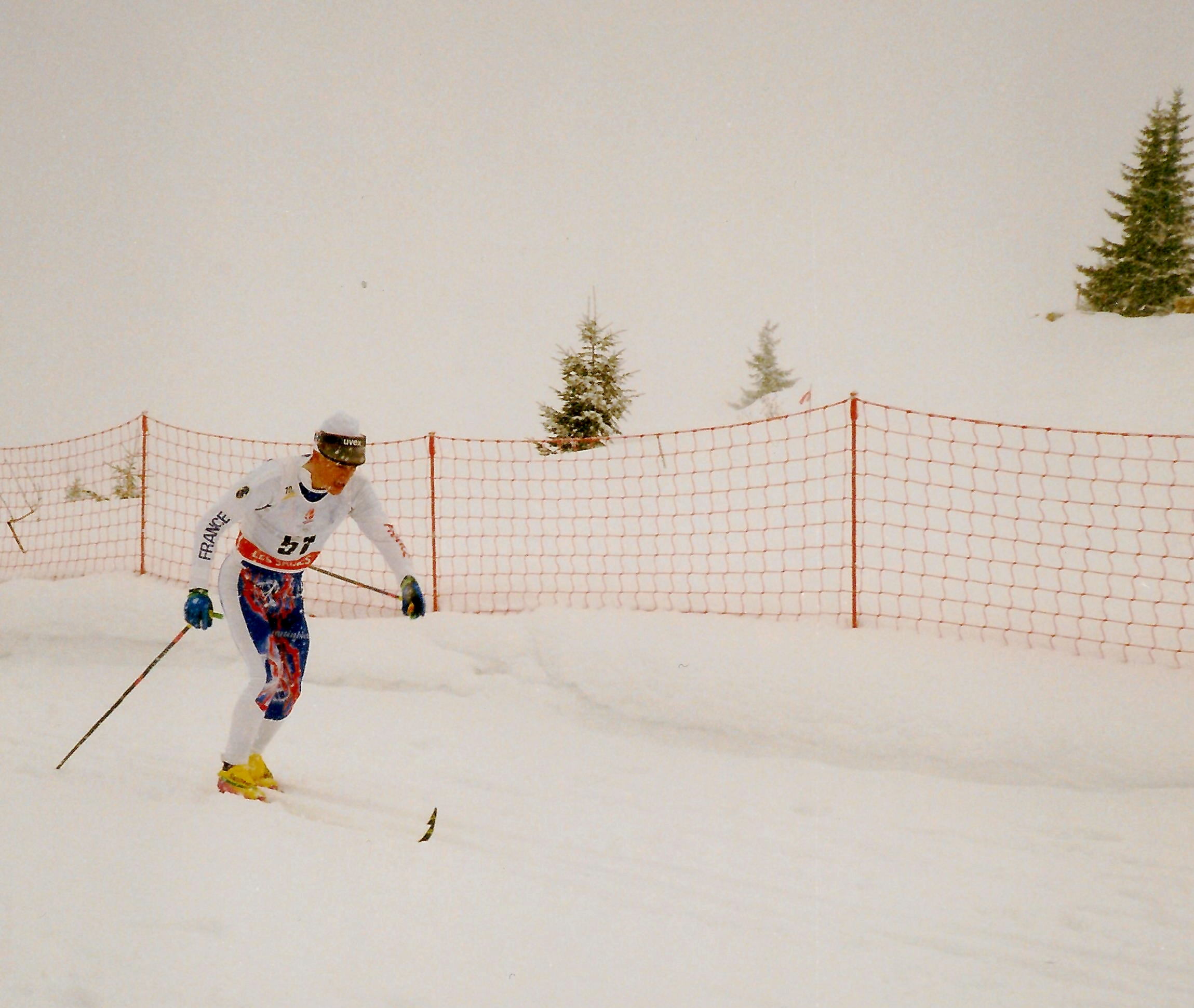
Stéphane Azambre

Stéphane Azambre (born 30 June 1969 in Grenoble) was a French cross-country skier who competed from 1992 to 1996. Competing in two Winter Olympics, he earned his best overall and individual finishes at Albertville in 1992 by finishing eighth in the 4 x 10 km relay and 26th in the 50 km event, respectively.

Azambre's best finish at the FIS Nordic World Ski Championships was 21st twice (1993: 10 km + 15 km combined pursuit, 1995: 50 km). His best World Cup finish was seventh in a 15 km event in Italy in 1992.

Azambre's lone career victory was in a 10 km Continental Cup event in Italy in 1997.
