= Claude Dasse =

French bobsledder

Claude Dasse (born 7 July 1964 in Paris) is a French bobsledder who competed in the early 1990s. Competing in two Winter Olympics, he earned his best finish of eighth in the four-man event at Albertville in 1992.
