= Béatrice Filliol =

French alpine skier (born 1969)

Béatrice Filliol (born 12 May 1969) is a former French alpine skier who competed in the 1992 Winter Olympics and 1994 Winter Olympics.
