= Xavier Girard =

French Nordic combined skier (born 1970)

Medal record

Men's Nordic combined

World Championships
Silver medal – second place	1991 Val di Fiemme	3 x 10 km team

Xavier Girard (born 1970) is a French Nordic combined skier who competed from 1988 to 1992. He won a silver medal in the 3 x 10 km team event at the 1991 FIS Nordic World Ski Championships in Val di Fiemme.

Girard's best individual finish was 2nd in Canada in 1989.
