= Stéphane Botteri =

French ice hockey player (born 1962)

Personal information
- Nationality: French
- Born: 27 January 1962 (age 63) Annecy, France

Sport
- Sport: Ice hockey

Stéphane Botteri (born 27 January 1962) is a French ice hockey player. He competed in the men's tournaments at the 1988 Winter Olympics, the 1992 Winter Olympics and the 1994 Winter Olympics.
