= Cathy Chedal =

French alpine skier (born 1968)

Cathy Chedal (born 14 June 1968 in Brides-les-Bains) is a French former alpine skier who competed in the 1988 Winter Olympics and 1992 Winter Olympics.
