= Philippe Sanchez =

French cross-country skier (born 1969)

Philippe Sanchez (born 26 September 1969) is a former French cross-country skier who competed from as a senior competitor from 1992 to 1998. Competing in three Winter Olympics, his best overall finish was eighth in the 4 x 10 km relay at Albertville in 1992 while his best individual finish was 29th in the 10 km + 15 km combined pursuit at Lillehammer in 1994.

Sanchez's best finish at the FIS Nordic World Ski Championships was 33rd in the 50 km event at Thunder Bay, Ontario in 1995. His best World Cup finish was 15th in the 15 km event in Italy in 1994.

Sanchez has three individual victories in lesser events, all at 15 km from 1995 to 1996, including the European Championship.

At the end of his career, Sanchez became a trainer, helping the young competitors of his home mountains to progress.

Nowadays, he lives near Bordeaux, and became a knifemaker, creating "VAGALAMES coutellerie".
