= Sophie Lefranc-Duvillard =

French alpine skier (1971–2017)

Sophie Lefranc-Duvillard (5 February 1971 – 22 April 2017) was a French alpine skier who competed in the 1992 Winter Olympics, 1994 Winter Olympics, and 1998 Winter Olympics.
