= Antoine Richer =

French ice hockey player

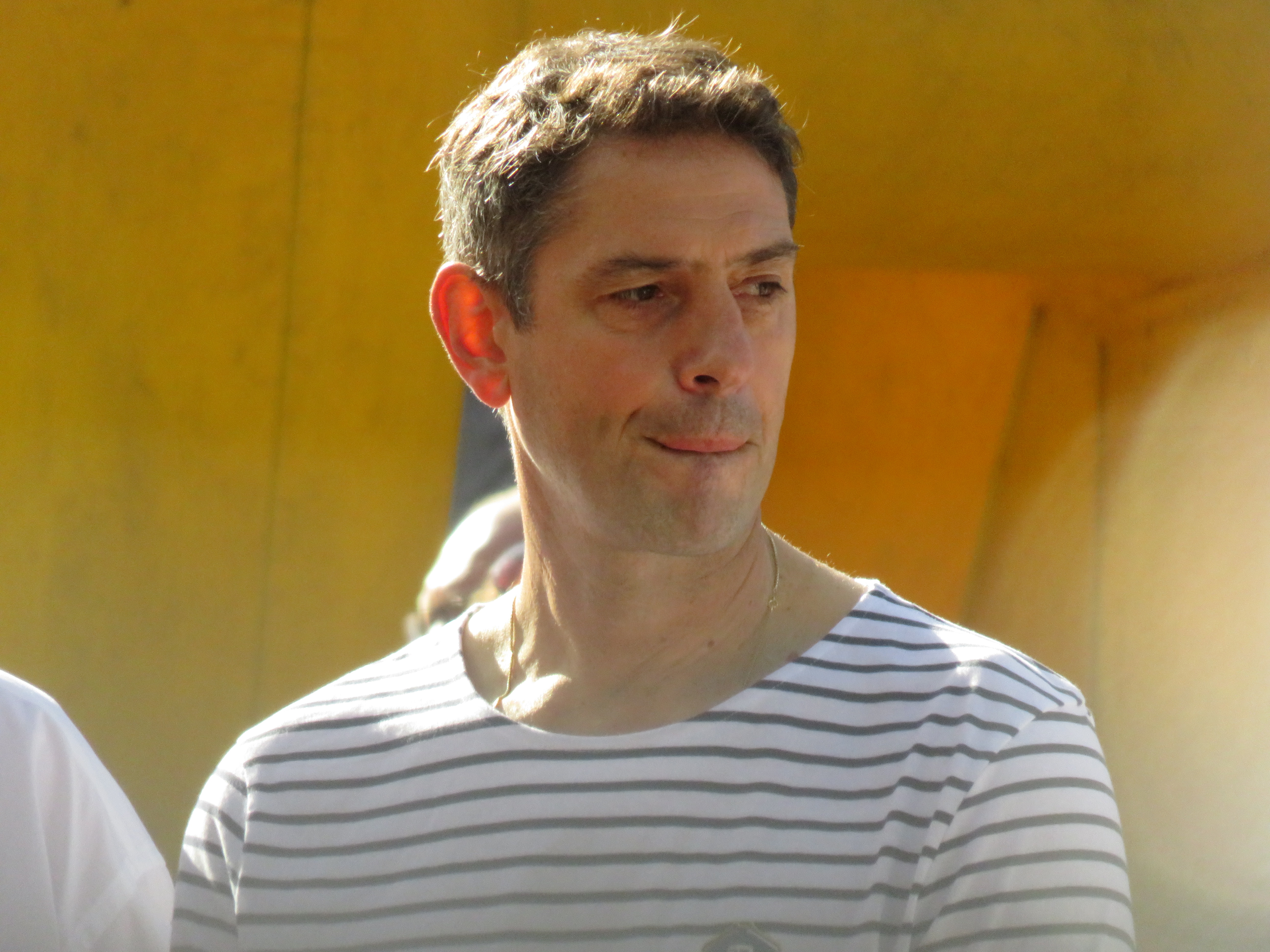
- Richer in 2016.

Personal information
- Nationality: French
- Born: 9 August 1961 (age 63); Amiens, France

Sport
- Sport: Ice hockey

Antoine Richer (born 9 August 1961) is a French ice hockey player. He competed in the men's tournaments at the 1988 Winter Olympics, the 1992 Winter Olympics and the 1994 Winter Olympics.
