= Guy Balland =

French cross-country skier (born 1960)

Personal information
- Nationality: French
- Born: 16 May 1960 (age 64); Champagnole, France

Sport
- Sport: Cross-country skiing

Guy Balland (born 16 May 1960) is a French cross-country skier. He competed at the 1988 Winter Olympics and the 1992 Winter Olympics.
