= Patrick Rémy (skier) =

French cross-country skier (born 1965)

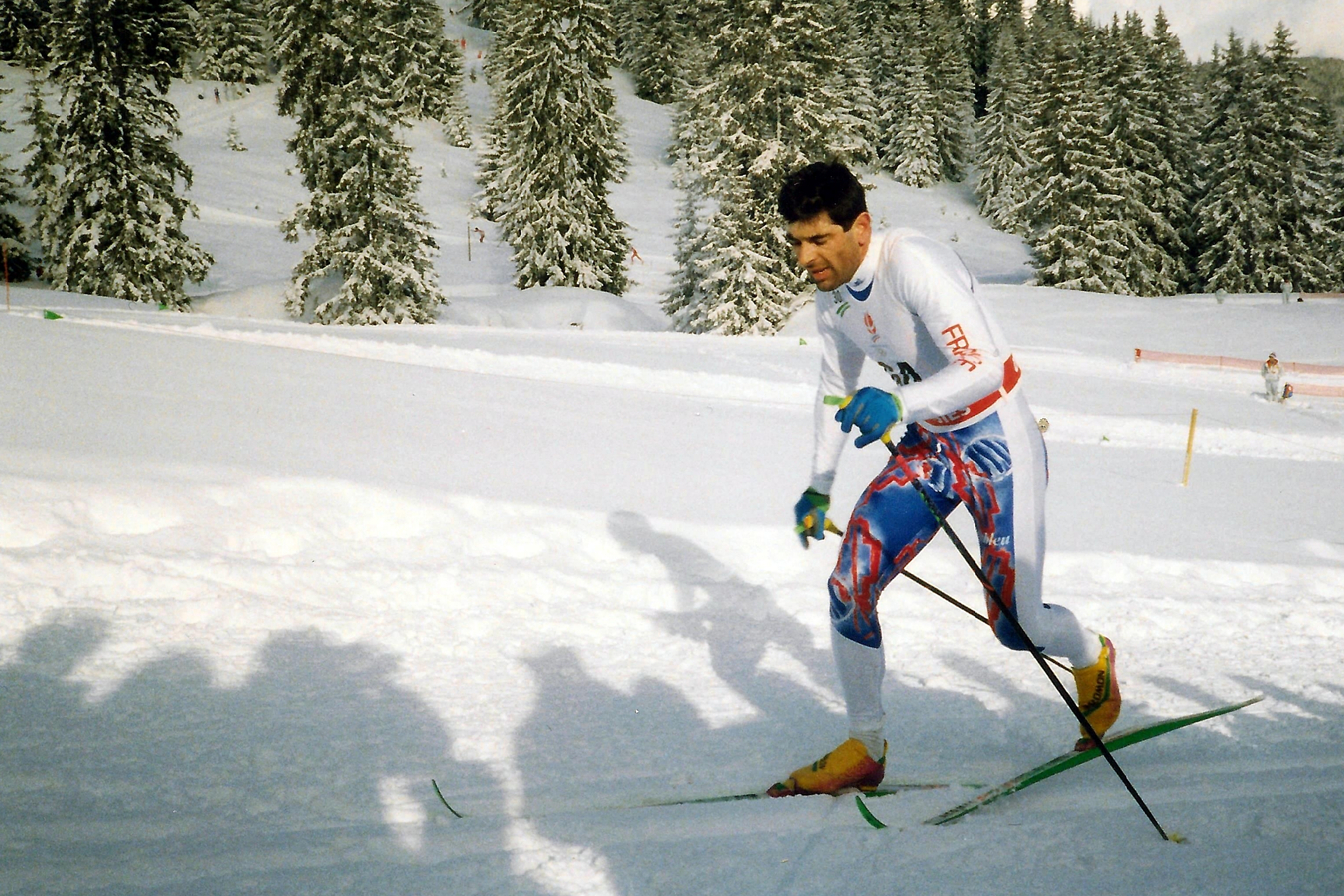
Patrick Rémy at the 1992 Winter Olympics

Patrick Rémy (born 27 April 1965 in Gérardmer) was a French cross-country skier who competed from 1990 to 2000. Competing in three Winter Olympics, his best career finish was eighth in the 4 x 10 km relay at Albertville in 1992 while his best individual finish was 20th twice (10 km + 15 km combined pursuit: 1994, 10 km: 1998).

Rémy's best finish at the FIS Nordic World Ski Championships was 26th in the 30 km event at Falun in 1993. His best World Cup finish was fourth in a 30 km event in Canada in 1991.

Rémy earned three individual career victories in lesser events up to 15 km from 1995 to 1998.
