= Nordic combined at the 1988 Winter Olympics – Individual =

Individual at the XV Olympic Winter Games
- Pictogram for Nordic combined
- Venue: Canada Olympic Park (ski jumping); Canmore Nordic Centre (cross-country skiing)
- Dates: 27–28 February
- Competitors: 43 from 13 nations
- Winning time: 39:27.5

Medalists
1st place, gold medalist(s)		Hippolyt Kempf	Switzerland
2nd place, silver medalist(s)		Klaus Sulzenbacher	Austria
3rd place, bronze medalist(s)		Allar Levandi	Soviet Union

The men's individual Nordic combined competition for the 1988 Winter Olympics in Calgary at Canada Olympic Park and Canmore Nordic Centre on 27 and 28 February.

This was the first individual event that used the Gundersen system, using a pursuit cross-country race, with the time gaps for the pursuit determined by the point differences in the ski jumping.

== Results ==
=== Ski Jumping ===
Athletes did three normal hill ski jumps, with the lowest score dropped. The combined points earned on the jumps determined the starting order and times for the cross-country race; each three points was equal to a 20-second deficit.

Rank	Name	Country	Jump 1	Jump 2	Jump 3	Points	Time Difference
1	Klaus Sulzenbacher	Austria	114.5	114.0	~~112.7~~	228.5	+0:00.0
2	Hubert Schwarz	West Germany	110.1	~~107.8~~	109.1	219.2	+1:02.0
3	Hippolyt Kempf	Switzerland	107.5	~~98.5~~	110.4	217.9	+1:10.7
4	Allar Levandi	Soviet Union	~~99.6~~	108.6	108.0	216.6	+1:19.4
5	Thomas Prenzel	East Germany	~~99.7~~	105.6	109.9	215.5	+1:26.7
6	Trond Arne Bredesen	Norway	~~102.3~~	104.2	111.0	215.2	+1:28.7
7	Hansjörg Aschenwald	Austria	~~99.6~~	106.3	107.8	214.1	+1:36.0
8	Tadeusz Bafia	Poland	103.9	~~103.4~~	107.4	211.3	+1:54.7
9	Joe Holland	United States	101.8	~~96.4~~	108.6	210.4	+2:00.7
10	Marko Frank	East Germany	~~83.2~~	109.9	99.5	209.4	+2:07.4
11	Klaus Ofner	Austria	~~95.0~~	106.3	102.6	208.9	+2:10.7
12	Miroslav Kopal	Czechoslovakia	~~102.4~~	103.2	105.5	208.7	+2:12.0
13	Uwe Prenzel	East Germany	~~93.7~~	102.6	105.0	207.6	+2:19.4
14	Andreas Schaad	Switzerland	~~99.7~~	104.3	102.9	207.2	+2:22.0
15	Hans-Peter Pohl	West Germany	~~98.4~~	99.0	105.3	204.3	+2:41.4
16	Knut Leo Abrahamsen	Norway	96.5	~~89.4~~	107.6	204.1	+2:42.7
17	Vasily Savin	Soviet Union	~~80.0~~	103.7	100.0	203.7	+2:45.4
18	Sami Leinonen	Finland	~~93.4~~	103.7	98.7	202.4	+2:54.0
19	Torbjørn Løkken	Norway	101.6	97.8	~~93.5~~	199.4	+3:14.0
20	Jouko Parviainen	Finland	100.2	~~74.7~~	98.7	198.9	+3:17.4
21	Ján Klimko	Czechoslovakia	~~94.2~~	102.7	95.4	198.1	+3:22.7
22	Hallstein Bøgseth	Norway	~~92.9~~	100.8	96.9	197.7	+3:25.4
23	Ladislav Patráš	Czechoslovakia	~~88.0~~	100.6	96.2	196.8	+3:31.4
24	Jukka Ylipulli	Finland	96.2	100.5	~~93.2~~	196.7	+3:32.0
25	Günther Csar	Austria	98.0	98.2	~~95.0~~	196.2	+3:35.4
26	Andrey Dundukov	Soviet Union	95.0	99.0	~~93.4~~	194.0	+3:50.0
27	Xavier Girard	France	~~82.2~~	96.2	97.7	193.9	+3:50.7
28	Pasi Saapunki	Finland	97.1	96.2	~~95.1~~	193.3	+3:54.7
29	Fabrice Guy	France	~~80.7~~	101.7	90.4	192.1	+4:02.7
30	Sergey Nikiforov	Soviet Union	95.4	96.4	~~86.3~~	191.8	+4:04.7
31	Thomas Müller	West Germany	95.4	~~89.6~~	95.0	190.4	+4:14.0
32	Kazuoki Kodama	Japan	~~76.8~~	88.4	99.3	187.7	+4:32.0
33	Jon Servold	Canada	~~84.6~~	96.7	90.4	187.1	+4:36.0
34	František Repka	Czechoslovakia	~~77.2~~	90.1	94.0	184.1	+4:56.0
35	Jean-Pierre Bohard	France	~~77.7~~	85.5	97.7	183.2	+5:02.0
36	Masashi Abe	Japan	92.9	89.6	~~86.7~~	182.5	+5:06.7
37	Fredy Glanzmann	Switzerland	87.1	93.0	~~80.7~~	180.1	+5:22.7
37	Todd Wilson	United States	88.2	91.9	~~78.1~~	180.1	+5:22.7
39	Hermann Weinbuch	West Germany	90.8	~~78.8~~	88.8	179.6	+5:26.0
40	Stefan Späni	Switzerland	91.6	87.0	~~57.3~~	178.6	+5:32.7
41	Hideki Miyazaki	Japan	~~75.5~~	87.5	88.3	175.8	+5:51.4
42	Francis Repellin	France	74.7	~~64.6~~	85.2	159.9	+7:37.4
43	Gary Crawford	United States	~~55.4~~	65.2	70.6	135.8	+10:18.0

=== Cross-Country ===
The cross-country race was over a distance of 15 kilometres.

Rank	Name	Country	Start time	Cross-country		Finish time
Rank	Name	Country	Start time	Time	Place	Finish time
1st place, gold medalist(s)	Hippolyt Kempf	Switzerland	+1:10.7	38:16.8	2	39:27.5
2nd place, silver medalist(s)	Klaus Sulzenbacher	Austria	+0:00.0	39:46.5	17	39:46.5
3rd place, bronze medalist(s)	Allar Levandi	Soviet Union	+1:19.4	39:12.4	12	40:31.8
4	Uwe Prenzel	East Germany	+2:19.4	38:18.8	4	40:38.2
5	Andreas Schaad	Switzerland	+2:22.0	38:18.0	3	40:40.0
6	Torbjørn Løkken	Norway	+3:14.0	37:39.0	1	40:53.0
7	Miroslav Kopal	Czechoslovakia	+2:12.0	38:48.0	8	41:00.0
8	Marko Frank	East Germany	+2:07.4	39:08.2	11	41:15.6
9	Thomas Prenzel	East Germany	+1:26.7	39:51.4	20	41:18.1
10	Vasily Savin	Soviet Union	+2:45.4	38:37.5	6	41:22.9
11	Trond Arne Bredesen	Norway	+1:28.7	40:13.9	23	41:42.6
12	Andrey Dundukov	Soviet Union	+3:50.0	38:31.1	5	42:21.1
13	Hubert Schwarz	West Germany	+1:02.0	41:33.8	33	42:35.8
14	Sergey Nikiforov	Soviet Union	+4:04.7	38:38.3	7	42:43.0
15	Pasi Saapunki	Finland	+3:54.7	38:49.4	9	42:44.1
16	Jukka Ylipulli	Finland	+3:32.0	39:23.6	14	42:55.6
17	Sami Leinonen	Finland	+2:54.0	40:04.4	22	42:58.4
18	Tadeusz Bafia	Poland	+1:54.7	41:05.3	29	43:00.0
19	Joe Holland	United States	+2:00.7	41:01.8	28	43:02.5
20	Fabrice Guy	France	+4:02.7	39:19.7	13	43:22.4
21	Ladislav Patráš	Czechoslovakia	+3:31.4	39:53.5	21	43:24.9
22	Klaus Ofner	Austria	+2:10.7	41:15.6	31	43:26.3
23	Hallstein Bøgseth	Norway	+3:25.4	40:14.0	24	43:39.4
24	Hansjörg Aschenwald	Austria	+1:36.0	42:19.5	40	43:55.5
25	Thomas Müller	West Germany	+4:14.0	39:48.7	18	44:02.7
26	Knut Leo Abrahamsen	Norway	+2:42.7	41:23.5	32	44:06.2
27	Ján Klimko	Czechoslovakia	+3:22.7	40:43.6	26	44:06.3
28	Hans-Peter Pohl	West Germany	+2:41.4	41:42.5	36	44:23.9
29	Hermann Weinbuch	West Germany	+5:26.0	39:00.4	10	44:26.4
30	František Repka	Czechoslovakia	+4:56.0	39:34.1	16	44:30.1
31	Masashi Abe	Japan	+5:06.7	39:24.4	15	44:31.1
32	Xavier Girard	France	+3:50.7	41:00.2	27	44:50.9
33	Jouko Parviainen	Finland	+3:17.4	41:42.2	35	44:59.6
34	Günther Csar	Austria	+3:35.4	41:50.8	37	45:26.2
35	Fredy Glanzmann	Switzerland	+5:22.7	40:16.1	25	45:38.8
36	Kazuoki Kodama	Japan	+4:32.0	41:08.2	30	45:40.2
37	Hideki Miyazaki	Japan	+5:51.4	39:49.4	19	45:40.8
38	Jon Servold	Canada	+4:36.0	41:56.1	38	46:32.1
39	Jean-Pierre Bohard	France	+5:02.0	41:33.9	34	46:35.9
40	Todd Wilson	United States	+5:22.7	42:07.9	39	47:30.6
41	Gary Crawford	United States	+10:18.0	43:54.7	41	54:12.7
-	Stefan Späni	Switzerland	+5:32.7	DNS	-	-
-	Francis Repellin	France	+7:37.4	DNF	-	-
