= Nordic combined at the 1988 Winter Olympics – Team =

Team at the XV Olympic Winter Games
- Venue: Canada Olympic Park (ski jumping); Canmore Nordic Centre (cross-country skiing)
- Dates: 23–24 February 1988
- Competitors: 30 from 10 nations
- Winning time: Team jump: 629.8; Ski time: 1:20:46.0; Final time: 1:20:46.0

Medalists
| 1st place, gold medalist(s) | | Hans-Peter Pohl; Hubert Schwarz; Thomas Müller | West Germany |
| 2nd place, silver medalist(s) | | Andreas Schaad; Hippolyt Kempf; Fredy Glanzmann | Switzerland |
| 3rd place, bronze medalist(s) | | Günther Csar; Hansjörg Aschenwald; Klaus Sulzenbacher | Austria |

The men's team Nordic combined competition for the 1988 Winter Olympics in Calgary was held at Canada Olympic Park and Canmore Nordic Centre on 23 and 24 February.

== Results ==
=== Ski jumping ===
Each of the three team members performed three jumps, with the top two scores counting. The scores for each team were combined and used to calculate their deficit in the cross-country skiing portion of the event. Each point difference between teams in the ski jumping portion in this event resulted in a six-second difference in the cross country part of the event.

| Rank | Team | Points | Time difference |
|---|---|---|---|
| 1 | West Germany; Hans-Peter Pohl; Hubert Schwarz; Thomas Müller | 629.8; 204.7; 227.2; 197.9 | +0:00 |
| 2 | Austria; Günther Csar; Hansjörg Aschenwald; Klaus Sulzenbacher | 626.6; 193.7; 204.5; 228.4 | +0:16 |
| 3 | Norway; Hallstein Bøgseth; Trond Arne Bredesen; Torbjørn Løkken | 596.6; 195.0; 201.1; 200.5 | +2:46 |
| 4 | Czechoslovakia; Ladislav Patráš; Ján Klimko; Miroslav Kopal | 573.5; 192.0; 184.7; 196.8 | +4:41 |
| 5 | East Germany; Thomas Prenzel; Marko Frank; Uwe Prenzel | 571.6; 183.9; 195.9; 191.8 | +4:51 |
| 6 | Switzerland; Andreas Schaad; Hippolyt Kempf; Fredy Glanzmann | 571.4; 195.4; 199.8; 176.2 | +4:52 |
| 7 | Finland; Pasi Saapunki; Jouko Parviainen; Jukka Ylipulli | 561.3; 165.0; 201.9; 194.4 | +5:43 |
| 8 | France; Jean-Pierre Bohard; Xavier Girard; Fabrice Guy | 541.0; 178.0; 187.2; 175.8 | +7:24 |
| 9 | United States; Joe Holland; Todd Wilson; Hans Johnstone | 516.9; 181.7; 175.7; 159.5 | +9:24 |
| 10 | Japan; Hideki Miyazaki; Masashi Abe; Kazuoki Kodama | 515.3; 166.2; 177.5; 171.6 | +9:32 |

=== Cross-country ===
Each member of the team completed a ten kilometre cross-country skiing leg.

| Rank | Team | Start time | Cross-country | | Finish time |
| Rank | Team | Start time | Time | Place | Finish time |
|---|---|---|---|---|---|
| 1st place, gold medalist(s) | West Germany; Hans-Peter Pohl; Hubert Schwarz; Thomas Müller | +0:00 | 1:20:46.0; 27:26.7; 27:45.7; 25:33.6 | 8 | 1:20:46.0 |
| 2nd place, silver medalist(s) | Switzerland; Andreas Schaad; Hippolyt Kempf; Fredy Glanzmann | +4:52 | 1:15:57.4; 25:34.7; 25:12.9; 25:09.8 | 1 | 1:20:49.4 |
| 3rd place, bronze medalist(s) | Austria; Günther Csar; Hansjörg Aschenwald; Klaus Sulzenbacher | +0:16 | 1:21:00.9; 26:39.7; 28:33.7; 25:47.5 | 9 | 1:21:16.9 |
| 4 | Norway; Hallstein Bøgseth; Trond Arne Bredesen; Torbjørn Løkken | +2:46 | 1:18:48.4; 26:18.6; 27:04.0; 25:25.8 | 3 | 1:21:34.4 |
| 5 | East Germany; Thomas Prenzel; Marko Frank; Uwe Prenzel | +4:51 | 1:18:13.5; 26:23.9; 26:12.1; 25:37.5 | 2 | 1:23:04.5 |
| 6 | Czechoslovakia; Ladislav Patráš; Ján Klimko; Miroslav Kopal | +4:42 | 1:19:02.1; 26:49.7; 26:30.4; 25:42.0 | 4 | 1:23:44.1 |
| 7 | Finland; Pasi Saapunki; Jouko Parviainen; Jukka Ylipulli | +5:43 | 1:19:56.3; 26:29.7; 26:42.3; 26:44.3 | 7 | 1:25:39.3 |
| 8 | France; Jean-Pierre Bohard; Xavier Girard; Fabrice Guy | +7:24 | 1:19:45.4; 27:04.9; 26:43.2; 25:57.3 | 5 | 1:27:09.4 |
| 9 | Japan; Hideki Miyazaki; Masashi Abe; Kazuoki Kodama | +9:33 | 1:19:54.3; 25:59.1; 26:54.9; 27:00.3 | 6 | 1:29:27.3 |
| 10 | United States; Joe Holland; Todd Wilson; Hans Johnstone | +9:25 | 1:23:42.9; 27:00.3; 27:03.1; 29:39.5 | 10 | 1:33:07.9 |
