= List of FIS Nordic World Ski Championships medalists in Nordic combined =

This is a list of medalists in the FIS Nordic World Ski Championships in Nordic combined. Numbers in brackets denotes number of victories in corresponding disciplines. Boldface denotes record number of victories.

== Introduction ==
This event debuted in 1925. At that time, the athletes competing in Nordic combined competed together with the 18 km athletes and the ski jumpers, so an athlete could conceivably win gold in ski jumping and combined on the same day. Already in 1926 the combined athletes got their own day of ski jumping. From 1958, there were separate cross country races for athletes competing in the combined competition, and there was one individual competition, with three jumps where the best two counted, and a 15 km cross country race. Later, the third jump was abolished. From 1985 onwards, the Gundersen method – named after the former combined athlete Gunder Gundersen, who devised the system – was used, where the points from ski jumping were recalculated into cross country skiing times and the athletes then started with a staggered start, the winning ski jumper starting first. The team event debuted in 1982, the sprint in 1999, and the mass start debuted in 2009 (it was only time when mass start event was held). Also in 2009, the 15 km individual Gundersen was changed to a 10 km individual normal hill event while the 7.5 sprint event was changed to a 10 km individual large hill event with the former involving a single jump from the normal hill while the latter involves a single jump from the large hill. The team sprint event debuted in 2013. In 2021, women Nordic combined skiers debuted at the World Championships with individual competition, consisting of ski jumping normal hill event and a 5 km cross country race. In 2023, there debuted mixed team event which replaced men's team sprint event. In 2025, the women's mass start was added to the program and 10 km individual normal hill event was changed to 7.5 km compact individual normal hill event.

== Men's events ==
=== Individual normal hill ===
This event is one of only three events held at every FIS Nordic World Ski Championships. Formerly known as the 18 km / 15 km / 10 km individual event, this event involved two jumps from the ski jumping normal (or basic) hill. Since the FIS Nordic World Ski Championships 2009 in Liberec, the event involved a single jump from the ski jumping normal hill followed by 10 km of cross country skiing. Any one point difference between competitors in the ski jump represented 4 seconds between them at the start of the cross country part of the competition. Since the FIS Nordic World Ski Championships 2025 in Trondheim, this event changed to compact format which features fixed starting times in accordance with the athlete's ranking after one ski jump which is separate to the number of points achieved in the ski jumping element of the contest.

Championships	Gold	Silver	Bronze
**18 km individual**
1925 Johannisbad	Otakar Německý; Czechoslovakia	Josef Adolf; Czechoslovakia	Xaver Affentranger; Switzerland
**15 km individual**
1926 Lahti	Johan Grøttumsbråten; Norway	Thorleif Haug; Norway	Einar Landvik; Norway
**18 km individual**
1927 Cortina d'Ampezzo	Rudolf Burkert; Czechoslovakia	Otakar Německý; Czechoslovakia	František Wende; Czechoslovakia
1929 Zakopane	Hans Vinjarengen; Norway	Ole Stenen; Norway	Esko Järvinen; Finland
1930 Oslo	Hans Vinjarengen (2); Norway	Leif Skagnæs; Norway	Knut Lunde; Norway
1931 Oberhof	Johan Grøttumsbråten (2); Norway	Sverre Kolterud; Norway	Arne Rustadstuen; Norway
1933 Innsbruck	Sven Eriksson; Sweden	Antonín Bartoň; Czechoslovakia	Harald Bosio; Austria
1934 Sollefteå	Oddbjørn Hagen; Norway	Sverre Kolterud; Norway	Hans Vinjarengen; Norway
1935 Vysoké Tatry	Oddbjørn Hagen (2); Norway	Lauri Valonen; Finland	Willy Bogner; Germany
1937 Chamonix	Sigurd Røen; Norway	Rolf Kaarby; Norway	Aarne Valkama; Finland
1938 Lahti	Olaf Hoffsbakken; Norway	John Westbergh; Sweden	Hans Vinjarengen; Norway
1939 Zakopane	Gustav 'Gustl' Berauer; Germany	Gustaf Adolf Sellin; Sweden	Magnar Fosseide; Norway
1950 Lake Placid	Heikki Hasu; Finland	Ottar Gjermundshaug; Norway	Simon Slåttvik; Norway
**15 km individual**
1954 Falun	Sverre Stenersen; Norway	Gunder Gundersen; Norway	Kjetil Mårdalen; Norway
1958 Lahti	Paavo Korhonen; Finland	Sverre Stenersen; Norway	Gunder Gundersen; Norway
1962 Zakopane	Arne Larsen; Norway	Dmitry Kochkin; Soviet Union	Ole Henrik Fagerås; Norway
1966 Oslo	Georg Thoma; West Germany	Franz Keller; West Germany	Alois Kälin; Switzerland
1970 Vysoké Tatry	Ladislav Rygl; Czechoslovakia	Nikolay Nogovitsyn; Soviet Union	Vyacheslav Dryagin; Soviet Union
1974 Falun	Ulrich Wehling; East Germany	Günter Deckert; East Germany	Stefan Hula; Poland
1978 Lahti	Konrad Winkler; East Germany	Rauno Miettinen; Finland	Ulrich Wehling; East Germany
1982 Oslo	Tom Sandberg; Norway	Konrad Winkler; East Germany	Uwe Dotzauer; East Germany
**15 km individual Gundersen**
1985 Seefeld	Hermann Weinbuch; West Germany	Geir Andersen; Norway	Jouko Karjalainen; Finland
1987 Oberstdorf	Torbjørn Løkken; Norway	Trond-Arne Bredesen; Norway	Hermann Weinbuch; West Germany
1989 Lahti	Trond Einar Elden; Norway	Andrey Dundukov; Soviet Union	Trond-Arne Bredesen; Norway
1991 Val di Fiemme	Fred Børre Lundberg; Norway	Klaus Sulzenbacher; Austria	Klaus Ofner; Austria
1993 Falun	Kenji Ogiwara; Japan	Knut Tore Apeland; Norway	Trond Einar Elden; Norway
1995 Thunder Bay	Fred Børre Lundberg (2); Norway	Jari Mantila; Finland	Sylvain Guillaume; France
1997 Trondheim	Kenji Ogiwara (2); Japan	Bjarte Engen Vik; Norway	Fabrice Guy; France
1999 Ramsau	Bjarte Engen Vik; Norway	Samppa Lajunen; Finland	Dmitry Sinitsyn; Russia
2001 Lahti	Bjarte Engen Vik (2); Norway	Samppa Lajunen; Finland	Felix Gottwald; Austria
2003 Val di Fiemme	Ronny Ackermann; Germany	Felix Gottwald; Austria	Samppa Lajunen; Finland
2005 Oberstdorf	Ronny Ackermann; Germany	Björn Kircheisen; Germany	Felix Gottwald; Austria
2007 Sapporo	Ronny Ackermann **(3)**; Germany	Bill Demong; United States	Anssi Koivuranta; Finland
**10 km individual Gundersen normall hill**
2009 Liberec	Todd Lodwick; United States	Jan Schmid; Norway	Bill Demong; United States
2011 Oslo	Eric Frenzel; Germany	Tino Edelmann; Germany	Felix Gottwald; Austria
2013 Val di Fiemme	Jason Lamy-Chappuis; France	Mario Stecher; Austria	Björn Kircheisen; Germany
2015 Falun	Johannes Rydzek; Germany	Alessandro Pittin; Italy	Jason Lamy-Chappuis; France
2017 Lahti	Johannes Rydzek (2); Germany	Eric Frenzel; Germany	Björn Kircheisen; Germany
2019 Seefeld	Jarl Magnus Riiber; Norway	Bernhard Gruber; Austria	Akito Watabe; Japan
2021 Oberstdorf	Jarl Magnus Riiber; Norway	Ilkka Herola; Finland	Jens Lurås Oftebro; Norway
2023 Planica	Jarl Magnus Riiber; Norway	Julian Schmid; Germany	Franz-Josef Rehrl; Austria
**7.5 km individual compact normall hill**
2025 Trondheim	Jarl Magnus Riiber **(4)**; Norway	Jens Lurås Oftebro; Norway	Vinzenz Geiger; Germany

Medal table

Rank	Nation	Gold	Silver	Bronze	Total
1	Norway	21	15	13	49
2	Germany	7	4	4	15
3	Czechoslovakia	3	3	1	7
4	Finland	2	6	5	13
5	East Germany	2	2	2	6
6	West Germany	2	1	1	4
7	Japan	2	0	1	3
8	Sweden	1	2	0	3
9	United States	1	1	1	3
10	France	1	0	3	4
11	Austria	0	4	6	10
12	Soviet Union	0	3	1	4
13	Italy	0	1	0	1
14	Switzerland	0	0	2	2
15	Poland	0	0	1	1
15	Russia	0	0	1	1
Totals (16 entries)		**42**	**42**	**42**	**126**

=== Team ===
Prior to 2009, this involved each team member taking two jumps from the ski jumping hill. For each point difference between teams, there is certain time between them at the start of the cross country part of the competition. This point – time difference changed over years. Since the 2009 championships, it involved each team member taking only one jump from the ski jumping hill with the point – time difference being 1 point equals 1.33 seconds (1 point equals 1 second since the 2023 championships). The ski jumping part of this event took place at normal hill at every championships except 2005, 2007, 2009, 2023 and 2025 editions when it took place at large hill (in 2011, there were held two separate team events at normal and large hills).

Championships	Gold	Silver	Bronze
**3 x 10 km team**
1982 Oslo	Uwe Dotzauer; Günther Schmieder; Konrad Winkler; East Germany	Jouko Karjalainen; Rauno Miettinen; Jorma Etelälahti; Finland shared with Hallstein Bøgseth; Espen Andersen; Tom Sandberg; Norway	(None)
1984 Rovaniemi	Tom Sandberg; Hallstein Bøgseth; Geir Andersen; Norway	Rauno Miettinen; Jukka Ylipulli; Jouko Karjalainen; Finland	Alexander Prosvirnin; Alexander Mayorov; Ildar Garifullin; Soviet Union
1985 Seefeld	Thomas Müller; Hubert Schwarz; Hermann Weinbuch; West Germany	Geir Andersen; Espen Andersen; Hallstein Bøgseth; Norway	Jyri Pelkonen; Jukka Ylipulli; Jouko Karjalainen; Finland
1987 Oberstdorf	Hermann Weinbuch (2); Hans-Peter Pohl; Thomas Müller (2); West Germany	Hallstein Bøgseth; Trond-Arne Bredesen; Torbjørn Løkken; Norway	Sergey Chervyakov; Andrey Dundukov; Allar Levandi; Soviet Union
1989 Lahti	Trond Einar Elden; Trond-Arne Bredesen; Bård Jørgen Elden; Norway	Andreas Schaad; Hippolyt Kempf; Fredy Glanzmann; Switzerland	Ralph Leonhardt; Bernd Blechschmidt; Thomas Abratis; East Germany
1991 Val di Fiemme	Günther Csar; Klaus Ofner; Klaus Sulzenbacher; Austria	Francis Repellin; Xavier Girard; Fabrice Guy; France	Reiichi Mikata; Masashi Abe; Kazuoki Kodama; Japan
1993 Falun	Takanori Kono; Masashi Abe; Kenji Ogiwara; Japan	Trond Einar Elden; Knut Tore Apeland; Fred Børre Lundberg; Norway	Thomas Dufter; Jens Deimel; Hans-Peter Pohl; Germany
**4 x 5 km team**
1995 Thunder Bay	Masashi Abe (2); Tsugiharu Ogiwara; Kenji Ogiwara (2); Takanori Kono (2); Japan	Halldor Skard; Bjarte Engen Vik; Knut Tore Apeland; Fred Børre Lundberg; Norway	Markus Wüst; Armin Krugel; Stefan Wittwer; Jean-Yves Cuendet; Switzerland
1997 Trondheim	Halldor Skard; Bjarte Engen Vik; Knut Tore Apeland; Fred Børre Lundberg; Norway	Jari Mantila; Tapio Nurmela; Samppa Lajunen; Hannu Manninen; Finland	Christophe Eugen; Felix Gottwald; Mario Stecher; Robert Stadelmann; Austria
1999 Ramsau	Hannu Manninen; Tapio Nurmela; Jari Mantila; Samppa Lajunen; Finland	Fred Børre Lundberg; Trond Einar Elden; Bjarte Engen Vik; Kenneth Braaten; Norway	Nikolay Parfyonov; Alexey Fadeyev; Valeri Stolyarov; Dmitry Sinitsyn; Russia
2001 Lahti	Kenneth Braaten; Sverre Rotevatn; Bjarte Engen Vik (2); Kristian Hammer; Norway	Christophe Eugen; Mario Stecher; David Kreiner; Felix Gottwald; Austria	Jari Mantila; Hannu Manninen; Jaakko Tallus; Samppa Lajunen; Finland
2003 Val di Fiemme	Michael Gruber; Wilhelm Denifl; Christoph Bieler; Felix Gottwald; Austria	Thorsten Schmitt; Georg Hettich; Björn Kircheisen; Ronny Ackermann; Germany	Hannu Manninen; Jouni Kaitainen; Jaakko Tallus; Samppa Lajunen; Finland
2005 Oberstdorf	Petter Tande; Håvard Klemetsen; Magnus Moan; Kristian Hammer (2); Norway	Sebastian Haseney; Georg Hettich; Björn Kircheisen; Ronny Ackermann; Germany	Michael Gruber; Christoph Bieler; David Kreiner; Felix Gottwald; Austria
2007 Sapporo	Anssi Koivuranta; Janne Ryynänen; Jaakko Tallus; Hannu Manninen (2); Finland	Sebastian Haseney; Ronny Ackermann; Tino Edelmann; Björn Kircheisen; Germany	Håvard Klemetsen; Espen Rian; Petter Tande; Magnus Moan; Norway
2009 Liberec	Yūsuke Minato; Taihei Kato; Akito Watabe; Norihito Kobayashi; Japan	Ronny Ackermann; Eric Frenzel; Björn Kircheisen; Tino Edelmann; Germany	Mikko Kokslien; Petter Tande; Jan Schmid; Magnus Moan; Norway
2011 Oslo (normal hill)	David Kreiner; Bernhard Gruber; Felix Gottwald; Mario Stecher; Austria	Johannes Rydzek; Björn Kircheisen; Tino Edelmann; Eric Frenzel; Germany	Jan Schmid; Magnus Moan; Mikko Kokslien; Håvard Klemetsen; Norway
2011 Oslo (large hill)	Bernhard Gruber (2); David Kreiner (2); Felix Gottwald **(3)**; Mario Stecher (2); Austria	Johannes Rydzek; Björn Kircheisen; Eric Frenzel; Tino Edelmann; Germany	Mikko Kokslien; Håvard Klemetsen; Jan Schmid; Magnus Moan; Norway
2013 Val di Fiemme	François Braud; Maxime Laheurte; Sébastien Lacroix; Jason Lamy-Chappuis; France	Jørgen Graabak; Håvard Klemetsen; Magnus Krog; Magnus Moan; Norway	Taylor Fletcher; Bryan Fletcher; Todd Lodwick; Bill Demong; United States
2015 Falun	Tino Edelmann; Eric Frenzel; Fabian Rießle; Johannes Rydzek; Germany	Magnus Moan; Håvard Klemetsen; Mikko Kokslien; Jørgen Graabak; Norway	François Braud; Maxime Laheurte; Sébastien Lacroix; Jason Lamy-Chappuis; France
2017 Lahti	Björn Kircheisen; Eric Frenzel (2); Fabian Rießle (2); Johannes Rydzek; Germany	Magnus Moan; Mikko Kokslien; Magnus Krog; Jørgen Graabak; Norway	Bernhard Gruber; Mario Seidl; Philipp Orter; Paul Gerstgraser; Austria
2019 Seefeld	Espen Bjørnstad; Jan Schmid; Jørgen Graabak; Jarl Magnus Riiber; Norway	Johannes Rydzek; Eric Frenzel; Fabian Rießle; Vinzenz Geiger; Germany	Gō Yamamoto; Yoshito Watabe; Hideaki Nagai; Akito Watabe; Japan
2021 Oberstdorf	Espen Bjørnstad (2); Jørgen Graabak; Jens Lurås Oftebro; Jarl Magnus Riiber; Norway	Terence Weber; Fabian Rießle; Eric Frenzel; Vinzenz Geiger; Germany	Johannes Lamparter; Lukas Klapfer; Mario Seidl; Lukas Greiderer; Austria
2023 Planica	Espen Andersen; Jens Lurås Oftebro (2); Jørgen Graabak **(3)**; Jarl Magnus Riiber **(3)**; Norway	Eric Frenzel; Vinzenz Geiger; Johannes Rydzek; Julian Schmid; Germany	Martin Fritz; Lukas Greiderer; Stefan Rettenegger; Johannes Lamparter; Austria
2025 Trondheim	Johannes Rydzek **(3)**; Wendelin Thannheimer; Julian Schmid; Vinzenz Geiger; Germany	Johannes Lamparter; Franz-Josef Rehrl; Martin Fritz; Fabio Obermeyr; Austria	Simen Tiller; Jørgen Graabak; Jens Lurås Oftebro; Jarl Magnus Riiber; Norway

1984 Extra World Championships in Rovaniemi, Finland as the team event was not on the program at the 1984 Winter Olympics in Sarajevo.

Medal table

Rank	Nation	Gold	Silver	Bronze	Total
1	Norway	8	9	5	22
2	Austria	4	2	5	11
3	Germany	3	9	1	13
4	Japan	3	0	2	5
5	Finland	2	3	3	8
6	West Germany	2	0	0	2
7	France	1	1	1	3
8	East Germany	1	0	1	2
9	Switzerland	0	1	1	2
10	Soviet Union	0	0	2	2
11	Russia	0	0	1	1
11	United States	0	0	1	1
Totals (12 entries)		**24**	**25**	**23**	**72**

=== Individual large hill ===
Formerly the 7.5 km sprint, it was similar to the 15 km Individual Gundersen except competitors have only one jump from the ski jumping large hill (in 1999 – one jump from the ski jumping normal hill) instead of two jumps from the ski jumping normal hill. For the 2009 championships, the event was changed to a single jump from the large hill followed by 10 km of cross country skiing. Any one point difference between competitors in the ski jump represents 4 seconds between them at the start of the cross country part of the competition.

Championships	Gold	Silver	Bronze
**7.5 individual Gundersen sprint**
1999 Ramsau	Bjarte Engen Vik; Norway	Mario Stecher; Austria	Kenji Ogiwara; Japan
2001 Lahti	Marco Baacke; Germany	Samppa Lajunen; Finland	Ronny Ackermann; Germany
2003 Val di Fiemme	Johnny Spillane; United States	Ronny Ackermann; Germany	Felix Gottwald; Austria
2005 Oberstdorf	Ronny Ackermann; Germany	Magnus Moan; Norway	Kristian Hammer; Norway
2007 Sapporo	Hannu Manninen; Finland	Magnus Moan; Norway	Björn Kircheisen; Germany
**10 km individual Gundersen large hill**
2009 Liberec	Bill Demong; United States	Björn Kircheisen; Germany	Jason Lamy-Chappuis; France
2011 Oslo	Jason Lamy-Chappuis; France	Johannes Rydzek; Germany	Eric Frenzel; Germany
2013 Val di Fiemme	Eric Frenzel; Germany	Bernhard Gruber; Austria	Jason Lamy-Chappuis; France
2015 Falun	Bernhard Gruber; Austria	François Braud; France	Johannes Rydzek; Germany
2017 Lahti	Johannes Rydzek; Germany	Akito Watabe; Japan	François Braud; France
2019 Seefeld	Eric Frenzel **(2)**; Germany	Jan Schmid; Norway	Franz-Josef Rehrl; Austria
2021 Oberstdorf	Johannes Lamparter; Austria	Jarl Magnus Riiber; Norway	Akito Watabe; Japan
2023 Planica	Jarl Magnus Riiber; Norway	Jens Lurås Oftebro; Norway	Johannes Lamparter; Austria
2025 Trondheim	Jarl Magnus Riiber **(2)**; Norway	Jørgen Graabak; Norway	Vinzenz Geiger; Germany

Medal table

Rank	Nation	Gold	Silver	Bronze	Total
1	Germany	5	3	5	13
2	Norway	3	6	1	10
3	Austria	2	2	3	7
4	United States	2	0	0	2
5	France	1	1	3	5
6	Finland	1	1	0	2
7	Japan	0	1	2	3
Totals (7 entries)		**14**	**14**	**14**	**42**

=== Mass start (discontinued) ===
10 km cross country is run first with mass start. The winner receives 120 points with anyone finishing behind them losing 1 point for every 4 seconds behind the winner. Two jumps from the normal hill are then done, based on distance with the K-points measurement. The winner is the one who earns the most points. This event was held at the 2009 championships only, being replaced by the 4 x 5 km team normal hill event.

Championships	Gold	Silver	Bronze
**10 km individual mass start**
2009 Liberec	Todd Lodwick; United States	Tino Edelmann; Germany	Jason Lamy-Chappuis; France

Medal table

Rank	Nation	Gold	Silver	Bronze	Total
1	United States	1	0	0	1
2	Germany	0	1	0	1
3	France	0	0	1	1
Totals (3 entries)		**1**	**1**	**1**	**3**

=== Team sprint large hill (discontinued) ===
Debuted: 2013. Discontinued: 2021.

Championships	Gold	Silver	Bronze
**2 x 7.5 km team sprint large hill**
2013 Val di Fiemme	Sébastien Lacroix; Jason Lamy-Chappuis; France	Wilhelm Denifl; Bernhard Gruber; Austria	Tino Edelmann; Eric Frenzel; Germany
2015 Falun	François Braud; Jason Lamy-Chappuis **(2)**; France	Eric Frenzel; Johannes Rydzek; Germany	Magnus Moan; Haavard Klemetsen; Norway
2017 Lahti	Eric Frenzel; Johannes Rydzek; Germany	Magnus Moan; Magnus Krog; Norway	Yoshito Watabe; Akito Watabe; Japan
2019 Seefeld	Eric Frenzel **(2)**; Fabian Rießle; Germany	Jan Schmid; Jarl Magnus Riiber; Norway	Franz-Josef Rehrl; Bernhard Gruber; Austria
2021 Oberstdorf	Johannes Lamparter; Lukas Greiderer; Austria	Espen Andersen; Jarl Magnus Riiber; Norway	Fabian Rießle; Eric Frenzel; Germany

Medal table

Rank	Nation	Gold	Silver	Bronze	Total
1	Germany	2	1	2	5
2	France	2	0	0	2
3	Austria	1	1	1	3
4	Norway	0	3	1	4
5	Japan	0	0	1	1
Totals (5 entries)		**5**	**5**	**5**	**15**

== Women's events ==
=== Individual normal hill ===
Debuted: 2021

Championships	Gold	Silver	Bronze
**5 km individual Gundersen normall hill**
2021 Oberstdorf	Gyda Westvold Hansen; Norway	Mari Leinan Lund; Norway	Marte Leinan Lund; Norway
2023 Planica	Gyda Westvold Hansen; Norway	Nathalie Armbruster; Germany	Haruka Kasai; Japan
2025 Trondheim	Gyda Westvold Hansen **(3)**; Norway	Ida Marie Hagen; Norway	Lisa Hirner; Austria

Medal table

Rank	Nation	Gold	Silver	Bronze	Total
1	Norway	3	2	1	6
2	Germany	0	1	0	1
3	Austria	0	0	1	1
3	Japan	0	0	1	1
Totals (4 entries)		**3**	**3**	**3**	**9**

=== Mass start ===
5 km cross country is run first with mass start. The winner receives 0 points with anyone finishing behind them losing 1 point every 4 seconds behind the winner. One jump from the normal hill is then done, based on distance with the K-points measurement. The winner is the one who earns the most points. This event debuted at the 2025 championships.

Championships	Gold	Silver	Bronze
**5 km individual mass start**
2025 Trondheim	Yuna Kasai; Japan	Gyda Westvold Hansen; Norway	Haruka Kasai; Japan

Medal table

Rank	Nation	Gold	Silver	Bronze	Total
1	Japan	1	0	1	2
2	Norway	0	1	0	1
Totals (2 entries)		**1**	**1**	**1**	**3**

== Mixed event ==
=== Mixed team normal hill ===
This event was first held in 2023. Each team consists of four members – two men and two women. Each team member takes one jump from the ski jumping hill with the point – time difference being 1 point equals 1 second. The women's ski legs are 2.5 km each while men ski legs are 5 km each.

Championships	Gold	Silver	Bronze
2023 Planica	Jens Lurås Oftebro; Ida Marie Hagen; Gyda Westvold Hansen; Jarl Magnus Riiber; Norway	Vinzenz Geiger; Jenny Nowak; Nathalie Armbruster; Julian Schmid; Germany	Stefan Rettenegger; Annalena Slamik; Lisa Hirner; Johannes Lamparter; Austria
2025 Trondheim	Jens Lurås Oftebro **(2)**; Gyda Westvold Hansen **(2)**; Ida Marie Hagen **(2)**; Jarl Magnus Riiber **(2)**; Norway	Julian Schmid; Jenny Nowak; Nathalie Armbruster; Vinzenz Geiger; Germany	Stefan Rettenegger; Claudia Purker; Lisa Hirner; Johannes Lamparter; Austria

Medal table

Rank	Nation	Gold	Silver	Bronze	Total
1	Norway	2	0	0	2
2	Germany	0	2	0	2
3	Austria	0	0	2	2
Totals (3 entries)		**2**	**2**	**2**	**6**

== Medal table ==
Table updated after the 2025 Championships.

Rank	Nation	Gold	Silver	Bronze	Total
1	Norway	37	36	21	94
2	Germany	17	21	12	50
3	Austria	7	9	18	34
4	Japan	6	1	8	15
5	Finland	5	10	8	23
6	France	5	2	8	15
7	United States	4	1	2	7
8	West Germany	4	1	1	6
9	Czechoslovakia	3	3	1	7
10	East Germany	3	2	3	8
11	Sweden	1	2	0	3
12	Soviet Union	0	3	3	6
13	Switzerland	0	1	3	4
14	Italy	0	1	0	1
15	Russia	0	0	2	2
16	Poland	0	0	1	1
Totals (16 entries)		**92**	**93**	**91**	**276**

== Most successful athletes (by number of victories) ==
Boldface denotes active Nordic combined skiers and highest medal count among all Nordic combined skiers (including these who not included in these tables) per type.

=== Men ===
==== All events ====
Rank	Nordic combined skier	Country	From	To	Gold	Silver	Bronze	Total
1	Jarl Magnus Riiber	Norway	2019	2025	**11**	3	1	15
2	Eric Frenzel	Germany	2011	2023	7	**8**	3	**18**
3	Johannes Rydzek	Germany	2011	2025	7	6	1	14
4	Bjarte Engen Vik	Norway	1995	2001	5	3	–	8
5	Jason Lamy-Chappuis	France	2009	2015	5	–	5	10
6	Ronny Ackermann	Germany	2001	2009	4	5	1	10
7	**Jens Lurås Oftebro**	Norway	2021	2025	4	2	2	8
8	Kenji Ogiwara	Japan	1993	1999	4	–	1	5
9	Jørgen Graabak	Norway	2013	2025	3	4	1	8
10	Bernhard Gruber	Austria	2011	2019	3	3	2	8

==== Individual events ====
Rank	Nordic combined skier	Country	From	To	Gold	Silver	Bronze	Total
1	Jarl Magnus Riiber	Norway	2019	2025	**6**	1	–	**7**
2	Ronny Ackermann	Germany	2001	2007	4	1	1	6
3	Eric Frenzel	Germany	2011	2019	3	1	1	5
3	Johannes Rydzek	Germany	2011	2017	3	1	1	5
5	Bjarte Engen Vik	Norway	1997	2001	3	1	–	4
6	Jason Lamy-Chappuis	France	2009	2015	2	–	**4**	6
7	Hans Vinjarengen	Norway	1929	1938	2	–	2	4
8	Kenji Ogiwara	Japan	1993	1999	2	–	1	3
9	Johan Grøttumsbråten	Norway	1926	1931	2	–	–	2
9	Oddbjørn Hagen	Norway	1934	1935	2	–	–	2
9	Todd Lodwick	United States	2009	2009	2	–	–	2
9	Fred Børre Lundberg	Norway	1991	1995	2	–	–	2

=== Women ===
==== All events ====
Rank	Nordic combined skier	Country	From	To	Gold	Silver	Bronze	Total
1	Gyda Westvold Hansen	Norway	2021	2025	**5**	1	–	**6**
2	**Ida Marie Hagen**	Norway	2023	2025	2	1	–	3
3	**Yuna Kasai**	Japan	2025	2025	1	–	–	1
4	**Nathalie Armbruster**	Germany	2023	2025	–	**3**	–	3
5	**Jenny Nowak**	Germany	2023	2025	–	2	–	2
6	**Mari Leinan Lund**	Norway	2021	2021	–	1	–	1
7	**Lisa Hirner**	Austria	2023	2025	–	–	**3**	3
8	**Haruka Kasai**	Japan	2023	2025	–	–	2	2
9	**Marte Leinan Lund**	Norway	2021	2021	–	–	1	1
9	**Claudia Purker**	Austria	2025	2025	–	–	1	1
9	**Annalena Slamik**	Austria	2023	2023	–	–	1	1

==== Individual events ====
Rank	Nordic combined skier	Country	From	To	Gold	Silver	Bronze	Total
1	Gyda Westvold Hansen	Norway	2021	2025	**3**	**1**	–	**4**
2	**Yuna Kasai**	Japan	2025	2025	1	–	–	1
3	**Nathalie Armbruster**	Germany	2023	2023	–	**1**	–	1
3	**Ida Marie Hagen**	Norway	2025	2025	–	**1**	–	1
3	**Mari Leinan Lund**	Norway	2021	2021	–	**1**	–	1
6	**Haruka Kasai**	Japan	2023	2025	–	–	**2**	2
7	**Lisa Hirner**	Austria	2025	2025	–	–	1	1
7	**Marte Leinan Lund**	Norway	2021	2021	–	–	1	1

== Best performers by country ==
Here are listed most successful Nordic combined skiers in the history of each medal-winning national team – according to the gold-first ranking system and by total number of World Championships medals (one skier if he holds national records in both categories or few skiers if these national records belongs to different persons). If the total number of medals is identical, the gold, silver and bronze medals are used as tie-breakers (in that order). If all numbers are the same, the skiers get the same placement and are sorted by the alphabetic order.

Country	Nordic combined skier	From	To	Gold	Silver	Bronze	Total
Norway	Jarl Magnus Riiber	2019	2025	**11**	3	1	15
Germany	Eric Frenzel	2011	2023	7	**8**	3	**18**
France	Jason Lamy-Chappuis	2009	2015	5	–	5	10
Japan	Kenji Ogiwara (by the gold first ranking system)	1993	1999	4	–	1	5
Japan	Akito Watabe (by total number of medals)	2009	2021	1	1	4	6
Austria	Bernhard Gruber (by the gold first ranking system)	2011	2019	3	3	2	8
Austria	Felix Gottwald (by total number of medals)	2001	2011	3	2	**6**	11
Finland	Hannu Manninen (by the gold first ranking system)	1997	2007	3	1	2	6
Finland	Samppa Lajunen (by total number of medals)	1997	2003	1	4	3	8
West Germany	Hermann Weinbuch	1985	1987	3	–	1	4
East Germany	Konrad Winkler	1978	1982	2	1	–	3
United States	Todd Lodwick (by the gold first ranking system)	2009	2013	2	–	1	3
United States	Bill Demong (by total number of medals)	2007	2013	1	1	2	4
Czechoslovakia	Otakar Německý	1925	1927	1	1	–	2
Sweden	Sven Eriksson	1933	1933	1	–	–	1
Soviet Union	Andrey Dundukov	1987	1989	–	1	1	2
Italy	Alessandro Pittin*	2015	2015	–	1	–	1
Switzerland	Fredy Glanzmann	1989	1989	–	1	–	1
Switzerland	Hippolyt Kempf	1989	1989	–	1	–	1
Switzerland	Andreas Schaad	1989	1989	–	1	–	1
Russia	Dmitry Sinitsyn	1999	1999	–	–	2	2
Poland	Stefan Hula*	1974	1974	–	–	1	1

An asterisk (*) marks athletes who are the only representatives of their respective countries to win a medal.

== See also ==
- Nordic combined at the Winter Olympics
- List of Olympic medalists in Nordic combined
- FIS Nordic Combined World Cup
