= Austria at the 1988 Winter Olympics =

- IOC code: AUT
- NOC: Austrian Olympic Committee
- Website: www.olympia.at (in German)

in Calgary
- Competitors: 81 (66 men, 15 women) in 10 sports
- Flag bearer: Leonhard Stock (alpine skiing)
- Medals Ranked 6th: Gold 3 Silver 5 Bronze 2 Total 10

Winter Olympics appearances (overview)
- 1924; 1928; 1932; 1936; 1948; 1952; 1956; 1960; 1964; 1968; 1972; 1976; 1980; 1984; 1988; 1992; 1994; 1998; 2002; 2006; 2010; 2014; 2018; 2022; 2026

Austria competed at the 1988 Winter Olympics in Calgary, Alberta, Canada.

== Competitors ==
The following is the list of number of competitors in the Games.

Sport	Men	Women	Total
Alpine skiing	9	8	17
Biathlon	5	–	5
Bobsleigh	8	–	8
Cross-country skiing	4	4	8
Figure skating	1	1	2
Ice hockey	23	–	23
Luge	6	1	7
Nordic combined	4	–	4
Ski jumping	4	–	4
Speed skating	2	1	3
Total	66	15	81

== Medalists ==
Medal	Name	Sport	Event	Date
Gold	Hubert Strolz	Alpine skiing	Men's combined	17 February
Gold	Anita Wachter	Alpine skiing	Women's combined	21 February
Gold	Sigrid Wolf	Alpine skiing	Women's super-G	22 February
Silver	Bernhard Gstrein	Alpine skiing	Men's combined	17 February
Silver	Helmut Mayer	Alpine skiing	Men's super-G	21 February
Silver	Michael Hadschieff	Speed skating	Men's 10,000 metres	21 February
Silver	Hubert Strolz	Alpine skiing	Men's giant slalom	25 February
Silver	Klaus Sulzenbacher	Nordic combined	Individual	28 February
Bronze	Michael Hadschieff	Speed skating	Men's 1500 metres	20 February
Bronze	Hansjörg Aschenwald; Günther Csar; Klaus Sulzenbacher	Nordic combined	Team	24 February

== Alpine skiing ==
Men

Athlete	Event	Race 1	Race 2	Total	
Athlete	Event	Time	Time	Time	Rank
Günther Mader	Downhill			2:03.96	19
Anton Steiner	Downhill			2:02.19	7
Gerhard Pfaffenbichler	Downhill			2:02.02	5
Leonhard Stock	Downhill			2:01.56	4
Leonhard Stock	Super-G			1:42.36	8
Günther Mader	Super-G			1:41.96	5
Hubert Strolz	Super-G			1:41.11	4
Helmut Mayer	Super-G			1:40.96	2nd place, silver medalist(s)
Günther Mader	Giant Slalom	1:06.74	1:03.30	2:10.04	11
Helmut Mayer	Giant Slalom	1:06.32	1:02.77	2:09.09	7
Rudolf Nierlich	Giant Slalom	1:05.75	1:03.17	2:08.92	5
Hubert Strolz	Giant Slalom	1:05.05	1:02.36	2:07.41	2nd place, silver medalist(s)
Rudolf Nierlich	Slalom	DNF	–	DNF	–
Günther Mader	Slalom	52.69	DNF	DNF	–
Thomas Stangassinger	Slalom	52.42	DNF	DNF	–
Bernhard Gstrein	Slalom	51.87	48.21	1:40.08	4

Men's combined

Athlete	Downhill	Slalom		Total	
Athlete	Time	Time 1	Time 2	Points	Rank
Thomas Stangassinger	1:54.70	44.76	42.93	107.87	13
Bernhard Gstrein	1:50.20	43.17	42.65	43.45	2nd place, silver medalist(s)
Günther Mader	1:49.56	DNF	–	DNF	–
Hubert Strolz	1:48.51	44.56	42.75	36.55	1st place, gold medalist(s)

Women

Athlete	Event	Race 1	Race 2	Total	
Athlete	Event	Time	Time	Time	Rank
Sigrid Wolf	Downhill			DNF	–
Anita Wachter	Downhill			DNF	–
Elisabeth Kirchler	Downhill			1:27.19	8
Petra Kronberger	Downhill			1:27.03	6
Sylvia Eder	Super-G			1:22.39	25
Elisabeth Kirchler	Super-G			1:21.16	15
Anita Wachter	Super-G			1:20.36	5
Sigrid Wolf	Super-G			1:19.03	1st place, gold medalist(s)
Sigrid Wolf	Giant Slalom	DNF	–	DNF	–
Petra Kronberger	Giant Slalom	1:02.41	1:09.90	2:12.31	14
Ulrike Maier	Giant Slalom	1:01.41	1:06.59	2:08.10	6
Anita Wachter	Giant Slalom	1:00.23	1:08.15	2:08.38	7
Anita Wachter	Slalom	DNF	–	DNF	–
Ulrike Maier	Slalom	50.94	49.60	1:40.54	10
Roswitha Steiner	Slalom	50.43	48.34	1:38.77	4
Ida Ladstätter	Slalom	49.71	49.88	1:39.59	6

Women's combined

Athlete	Downhill	Slalom		Total	
Athlete	Time	Time 1	Time 2	Points	Rank
Ulrike Maier	DNF	–	–	DNF	–
Sylvia Eder	1:19.68	42.03	43.88	92.86	12
Petra Kronberger	1:18.36	44.53	43.25	88.01	11
Anita Wachter	1:17.14	40.68	42.29	29.25	1st place, gold medalist(s)

== Biathlon ==
Men

Event	Athlete	Misses ^{1}	Time	Rank
10 km Sprint	Alfred Eder	2	27:57.3	40
10 km Sprint	Egon Leitner	2	27:42.4	37
10 km Sprint	Bruno Hofstätter	1	27:02.8	23
10 km Sprint	Franz Schuler	1	26:45.0	17

Event	Athlete	Time	Misses	Adjusted time ^{2}	Rank
20 km	Franz Schuler	55:24.5	8	1'03:24.5	36
20 km	Egon Leitner	58:52.3	3	1'01:52.3	27
20 km	Alfred Eder	55:39.7	6	1'01:39.7	26
20 km	Bruno Hofstätter	57:05.1	4	1'01:05.1	24

Men's 4 x 7.5 km relay

Athletes	Race		
Athletes	Misses ^{1}	Time	Rank
Anton Lengauer-Stockner; Bruno Hofstätter; Franz Schuler; Alfred Eder	0	1'24:17.6	4

^{1} A penalty loop of 150 metres had to be skied per missed target.
^{2} One minute added per missed target.

== Bobsleigh ==
Sled	Athletes	Event	Run 1		Run 2		Run 3		Run 4		Total	
Sled	Athletes	Event	Time	Rank	Time	Rank	Time	Rank	Time	Rank	Time	Rank
AUT-1	Ingo Appelt; Harald Winkler	Two-man	57.22	2	59.83	12	1:00.00	5	59.44	9	3:56.49	5
AUT-2	Peter Kienast; Christian Mark	Two-man	58.19	13	58.96	4	1:00.48	12	59.28	7	3:56.91	8

Sled	Athletes	Event	Run 1		Run 2		Run 3		Run 4		Total	
Sled	Athletes	Event	Time	Rank	Time	Rank	Time	Rank	Time	Rank	Time	Rank
AUT-1	Peter Kienast; Franz Siegl; Christian Mark; Kurt Teigl	Four-man	57.07	11	57.40	4	56.27	2	57.91	8	3:48.65	6
AUT-2	Ingo Appelt; Josef Muigg; Gerhard Redl; Harald Winkler	Four-man	56.93	8	57.51	5	56.41	4	58.10	13	3:48.95	7

== Cross-country skiing ==
Men

Event	Athlete	Race	
Event	Athlete	Time	Rank
15 km C	Johann Standmann	46:04.1	42
15 km C	Alois Stadlober	45:38.5	36
15 km C	André Blatter	45:15.2	32
15 km C	Alois Schwarz	45:06.9	31
30 km C	Johann Standmann	1'34:24.8	44
30 km C	Alois Stadlober	1'32:00.0	33
30 km C	Alois Schwarz	1'29:34.4	18
50 km F	Alois Stadlober	DNF	–
50 km F	Alois Schwarz	2'17:03.5	41
50 km F	Johann Standmann	2'13:39.3	36
50 km F	André Blatter	2'10:43.6	19

C = Classical style, F = Freestyle

Men's 4 × 10 km relay

Athletes	Race	
Athletes	Time	Rank
André Blatter; Alois Schwarz; Johann Standmann; Alois Stadlober	1'49:14.5	10

Women

Event	Athlete	Race	
Event	Athlete	Time	Rank
5 km C	Hildegard Embacher	17:18.6	45
5 km C	Margot Kober	16:39.2	36
5 km C	Maria Theurl	16:36.7	34
5 km C	Cornelia Sulzer	16:09.7	20
10 km C	Maria Theurl	DNF	–
10 km C	Hildegard Embacher	34:53.2	42
10 km C	Margot Kober	32:22.2	34
10 km C	Cornelia Sulzer	32:17.1	26
20 km F	Margot Kober	DNF	–
20 km F	Hildegard Embacher	1'07:35.1	50
20 km F	Cornelia Sulzer	1'03:01.2	37

C = Classical style, F = Freestyle

== Figure skating ==
Ice Dancing

Athletes	CD	OD	FD	TFP	Rank
Kathrin Beck; Christoff Beck	5	5	5	10.0	5

== Ice hockey ==
=== Group B ===
Top three teams (shaded ones) entered the medal round.

	Pld	W	L	T	GF	GA	Pts
Soviet Union	5	5	0	0	32	10	10
West Germany	5	4	1	0	19	12	8
Czechoslovakia	5	3	2	0	23	14	6
United States	5	2	3	0	27	27	4
Austria	5	0	4	1	12	29	1
Norway	5	0	4	1	11	32	1

- USA 10-6 Austria
- Soviet Union 8-1 Austria
- Austria 1-3 West Germany
- Austria 4-0 Czechoslovakia
- Austria 4-4 Norway

=== Game for 9th place ===
Team 1	Score	Team 2
Austria	3–2	Poland

Team Roster

- Rudolf König
- Herbert Pök
- Konrad Dorn
- Bernard Hutz
- Martin Platzer
- Thomas Cijan
- Kelvin Greenbank
- Kurt Haranda
- Edward Lebler
- Peter Raffl
- Brian Stankiewicz
- Michael Shea
- Werner Kerth
- Manfred Mühr
- Gerhard Puschnik

- Andreas Salat

- Robin Sadler
- Hans Sulzer
- Gert Kompajn
- Peter Zhenalik
- Günter Koren
- Silvester Szybisti

== Luge ==
Men

Athlete	Run 1		Run 2		Run 3		Run 4		Total	
Athlete	Time	Rank	Time	Rank	Time	Rank	Time	Rank	Time	Rank
Gerhard Sandbichler	46.911	14	46.990	15	DSQ	–	–	–	DSQ	–
Otto Mayregger	46.777	10	46.896	14	46.925	11	46.931	8	3:07.619	9
Markus Prock	46.637	8	46.632	4	47.637	22	46.829	5	3:07.735	11

(Men's) Doubles

Athletes	Run 1		Run 2		Total	
Athletes	Time	Rank	Time	Rank	Time	Rank
Georg Fluckinger; Robert Manzenreiter	46.135	8	46.229	3	1:32.364	5
Gerhard Sandbichler; Franz Lechleitner	46.771	14	46.691	9	1:33.462	12

Women

Athlete	Run 1		Run 2		Run 3		Run 4		Total	
Athlete	Time	Rank	Time	Rank	Time	Rank	Time	Rank	Time	Rank
Andrea Tagwerker	46.787	13	47.140	13	46.735	9	46.839	14	3:07.501	12

== Nordic combined ==
Men's individual

Events:

- normal hill ski jumping (Best two out of three jumps.)
- 15 km cross-country skiing (Start delay, based on ski jumping results.)

Athlete	Event	Ski Jumping		Cross-country		Total	
Athlete	Event	Points	Rank	Start at	Time	Points	Rank
Günther Csar	Individual	196.2	25	3:35.4	45:26.2	378.430	34
Klaus Ofner	Individual	208.9	11	2:10.7	43:26.3	396.410	22
Hansjörg Aschenwald	Individual	214.1	7	1:36.0	43:55.5	392.025	24
Klaus Sulzenbacher	Individual	228.5	1	0:00.0	39:46.5	429.375	2nd place, silver medalist(s)

Men's Team

Three participants per team.

Events:

- normal hill ski jumping (Three jumps per team member per round, best two rounds counted.)
- 10 km cross-country skiing (Start delay, based on ski jumping results.)

Athletes	Ski jumping		Cross-country		Total
Athletes	Points	Rank	Start at	Time	Rank
Hansjörg Aschenwald; Günther Csar; Klaus Sulzenbacher	626.6	2	0:16.0	1'21:16.9	3rd place, bronze medalist(s)

== Ski jumping ==
Athlete	Event	Jump 1		Jump 2		Total	
Athlete	Event	Distance	Points	Distance	Points	Points	Rank
Ernst Vettori	Normal hill	79.5	94.8	76.0	86.7	181.5	24
Andreas Felder	Normal hill	80.5	96.9	81.0	95.2	192.1	12
Günther Stranner	Normal hill	83.5	98.7	78.0	87.9	186.6	20
Heinz Kuttin	Normal hill	87.0	105.3	80.5	94.4	199.7	6
Ernst Vettori	Large hill	103.0	94.1	96.5	82.5	176.6	28
Günther Stranner	Large hill	112.0	106.7	94.5	78.2	184.9	20
Heinz Kuttin	Large hill	112.0	108.2	98.5	85.3	193.5	12
Andreas Felder	Large hill	113.5	110.3	103.0	93.6	203.9	6

Men's team large hill

Athletes	Result	
Athletes	Points ^{1}	Rank
Ernst Vettori; Heinz Kuttin; Günther Stranner; Andreas Felder	577.6	5

^{1} Four teams members performed two jumps each. The best three were counted.

== Speed skating ==
Men

Event	Athlete	Race	
Event	Athlete	Time	Rank
500 m	Christian Eminger	39.70	34
500 m	Michael Hadschieff	37.90	26
1000 m	Michael Hadschieff	1:13.84	6
1500 m	Michael Hadschieff	1:52.31	3rd place, bronze medalist(s)
5000 m	Christian Eminger	6:57.22	20
5000 m	Michael Hadschieff	6:48.72	5
10,000 m	Christian Eminger	14:30.21	19
10,000 m	Michael Hadschieff	13:56.11	2nd place, silver medalist(s)

Women

Event	Athlete	Race	
Event	Athlete	Time	Rank
500 m	Emese Nemeth-Hunyady	41.38	19
1000 m	Emese Nemeth-Hunyady	1:22.22	16
3000 m	Emese Nemeth-Hunyady	4:27.56	14
