= 1987–88 FIS Nordic Combined World Cup =

International skiing competition

Nordic Combined World Cup 1987/88
Winners
- Overall: (Austria) Klaus Sulzenbacher
- Nations Cup: Norway

Competitions
- Venues: 7
- Individual: 7

The 1987/88 FIS Nordic Combined World Cup was the fifth World Cup season of Nordic combined, a combination of ski jumping and cross-country skiing organized by International Ski Federation. It started on 18 Dec 1987 in Bad Goisern, Austria and ended on 25 March 1988 in Rovaniemi, Finland.

== Calendar ==
=== Men ===
Num	Season	Date	Place	Hill	Discipline	Winner	Second	Third
31	1	18 December 1987	(Austria) Bad Goisern	Kalmberg-Schanzen	K90 / 15 km	(Austria) Klaus Sulzenbacher	(Norway) Torbjørn Løkken	(Norway) Knut Leo Abrahamsen
32	2	9 January 1988	(Switzerland) St. Moritz	Olympiaschanze	K94 / 15 km	(Norway) Torbjørn Løkken	(Austria) Klaus Sulzenbacher	(West Germany) Thomas Müller
33	3	16 January 1988	(Switzerland) Le Brassus	Tremplin de la Chirurgienne	K104 / 15 km	(Norway) Trond-Arne Bredesen	(Switzerland) Andreas Schaad	(Norway) Torbjørn Løkken
34	4	23 January 1988	(Austria) Seefeld	Toni-Seelos-Olympiaschanze	K90 / 15 km	(Austria) Klaus Sulzenbacher	(Switzerland) Hippolyt Kempf	(Switzerland) Andreas Schaad
1988 Winter Olympics
35	5	12 March 1988	(Sweden) Falun	Lugnet	K89 / 15 km	(Austria) Klaus Sulzenbacher	(Soviet Union) Vasily Savin	(Finland) Sami Leinonen
36	6	18 March 1988	(Norway) Oslo	Holmenkollbakken	K105 / 15 km	(Norway) Torbjørn Løkken	(Austria) Klaus Sulzenbacher	(East Germany) Uwe Prenzel
37	7	25 March 1988	(Finland) Rovaniemi	Ounasvaaran hyppyrimäki	K90 / 15 km	(Austria) Klaus Sulzenbacher	(Finland) Jukka Ylipulli	(Soviet Union) Andrey Dundukov

== Standings ==
=== Overall ===
Rank	after 7 events	Points
1	(Austria) Klaus Sulzenbacher	160
2	(Norway) Torbjørn Løkken	116
3	(Switzerland) Andreas Schaad	80
4	(Switzerland) Hippolyt Kempf	69
5	(Norway) Trond-Arne Bredesen	66
6	(West Germany) Thomas Müller	53
7	(East Germany) Uwe Prenzel	43
8	(Czechoslovakia) Miroslav Kopal	41
9	(Norway) Hallstein Bøgseth	36
	(Soviet Union) Vasily Savin	36

=== Nations Cup ===
Rank	after 7 events	Points
1	Norway	319
2	Austria	213
3	Switzerland	176
4	West Germany	166
5	Soviet Union	128
6	Finland	52
	Czechoslovakia	52
8	East Germany	38
9	Poland	24
10	Japan	17
