= 1986–87 FIS Nordic Combined World Cup =

International skiing competition

Nordic Combined World Cup 1986/87
Winners
- Overall: (Norway) Torbjørn Løkken
- Nations Cup: Norway

Competitions
- Venues: 9
- Individual: 9

The 1986/87 FIS Nordic Combined World Cup was the fourth World Cup season, a combination of ski jumping and cross-country skiing organized by the International Ski Federation. It started on 13 Dec 1986 in Calgary, Alberta, Canada and ended on 19 March 1987 in Oslo, Norway.

== Calendar ==
=== Men ===
Num	Season	Date	Place	Hill	Discipline	Winner	Second	Third align=right|
22	1	13 December 1986	(Canada) Calgary	Canada Olympic Park	K89 / 15 km	(Norway) Torbjørn Løkken	(Norway) Espen Andersen	(Soviet Union) Allar Levandi
23	2	30 December 1986	(East Germany) Oberwiesenthal	Fichtelbergschanzen	K90 / 15 km	(Switzerland) Hippolyt Kempf	(Soviet Union) Allar Levandi	(Czechoslovakia) Jan Klimko
24	3	3 January 1987	(West Germany) Schonach	Langenwaldschanze	K90 / 15 km	(West Germany) Hubert Schwarz	(Soviet Union) Vasily Savin	(Switzerland) Hippolyt Kempf
25	4	10 January 1987	(West Germany) Reit im Winkl	Franz-Haslberger-Schanze	K90 / 15 km	(Switzerland) Fredy Glanzmann	(Norway) Torbjørn Løkken	(Austria) Klaus Sulzenbacher
26	5	17 January 1987	(France) Autrans	Tremplin au Claret	K90 / 15 km	(Norway) Torbjørn Løkken	(Switzerland) Fredy Glanzmann	(Austria) Klaus Sulzenbacher
FIS Nordic World Ski Championships 1987
27	6	27 February 1987	(Finland) Lahti	Salpausselkä	K88 / 15 km	(West Germany) Thomas Müller	(West Germany) Hermann Weinbuch	(West Germany) Hubert Schwarz
28	7	6 March 1987	(Sweden) Falun	Lugnet	K89 / 15 km	(Norway) Torbjørn Løkken	(West Germany) Thomas Müller	(West Germany) Hermann Weinbuch
29	8	13 March 1987	(Soviet Union) Leningrad	Tramplin Kavgolovo	K88 / 15 km	(Soviet Union) Vasily Savin	(West Germany) Hermann Weinbuch	(West Germany) Thomas Müller
30	9	19 March 1987	(Norway) Oslo	Holmenkollbakken	K105 / 15 km	(West Germany) Hermann Weinbuch	(Norway) Trond Arne Bredesen	(Norway) Torbjørn Løkken

== Standings ==
=== Overall ===
Rank		Points
1	(Norway) Torbjørn Løkken	146
2	(West Germany) Hermann Weinbuch	100
3	(Switzerland) Hippolyt Kempf	90
4	(West Germany) Hubert Schwarz	89
5	(West Germany) Thomas Müller	86
6	(Soviet Union) Allar Levandi	73
7	(Soviet Union) Vasily Savin	72
8	(Austria) Klaus Sulzenbacher	68
9	(Norway) Trond-Arne Bredesen	66
10	(Switzerland) Fredy Glanzmann	52

- Standings after 9 events.

=== Nations Cup ===
Rank		Points
1	Norway	369
2	West Germany	316
3	Soviet Union	200
4	Switzerland	174
5	Austria	96
6	Japan	62
7	Finland	40
8	Poland	23
9	Czechoslovakia	23
10	France	19

- Standings after 9 events.
