= 1984–85 FIS Nordic Combined World Cup =

International skiing competition

Nordic Combined World Cup 1984/85
Winners
- Overall: (Norway) Geir Andersen
- Nations Cup: Norway

Competitions
- Venues: 7
- Individual: 7

The 1984/85 FIS Nordic Combined World Cup was the second World Cup season, a combination of ski jumping and cross-country skiing organized by International Ski Federation. It started on 15 Dec 1984 in Planica, Yugoslavia and ended on 16 March 1985 in Oslo, Norway.

== Calendar ==
=== Men ===
Num	Season	Date	Place	Hill	Discipline	Winner	Second	Third align=right|
8	1	15 December 1984	(Socialist Federal Republic of Yugoslavia) Planica	Srednja Bloudkova	K92 / 15 km	(Norway) Geir Andersen	(West Germany) Hubert Schwarz	(Norway) Hallstein Bøgseth
9	2	20 December 1984	(Switzerland) St. Moritz	Olympiaschanze	K94 / 15 km	(Norway) Geir Andersen	(West Germany) Hubert Schwarz	(West Germany) Thomas Müller
10	3	29 December 1984	(East Germany) Oberwiesenthal	Fichtelbergschanzen	K90 / 15 km	(East Germany) Heiko Hunger	(East Germany) Uwe Dotzauer	(East Germany) Oliver Warg
11	4	5 January 1985	(West Germany) Schonach	Langenwaldschanze	K90 / 15 km	(West Germany) Hermann Weinbuch	(Norway) Geir Andersen	(West Germany) Hubert Schwarz
FIS Nordic World Ski Championships 1985
12	5	23 February 1985	(Soviet Union) Leningrad	Toksovo	K88 / 15 km	(Norway) Geir Andersen	(West Germany) Hermann Weinbuch	(Norway) Hallstein Bøgseth
13	6	2 March 1985	(Finland) Lahti	Salpausselkä	K88 / 15 km	(Norway) Geir Andersen	(West Germany) Hermann Weinbuch	(West Germany) Thomas Müller
14	7	16 March 1985	(Norway) Oslo	Holmenkollbakken	K105 / 15 km	(West Germany) Hermann Weinbuch	(Norway) Geir Andersen	(East Germany) Heiko Hunger

== Standings ==
=== Overall ===
Rank	after 7 events	Points
1	(Norway) Geir Andersen	140
2	(West Germany) Hermann Weinbuch	126
3	(West Germany) Hubert Schwarz	79
4	(Norway) Hallstein Bøgseth	69
5	(East Germany) Heiko Hunger	62
6	(East Germany) Uwe Dotzauer	52
7	(West Germany) Thomas Müller	46
8	(Norway) Torbjørn Løkken	39
9	(Norway) Ivar Olsen	38
10	(Austria) Klaus Sulzenbacher	34

=== Nations Cup ===
Rank	after 7 events	Points
1	Norway	391
2	West Germany	299
3	East Germany	177
4	Finland	49
5	Austria	48
6	United States	44
7	Switzerland	41
8	Poland	24
9	Italy	22
	Czechoslovakia	22
