= Nordic combined at the 1980 Winter Olympics =

Nordic combined at the XIII Olympic Winter Games
- Venue: Lake Placid Olympic Ski Jumping Complex (ski jumping); Lake Placid Olympic Sports Complex Cross Country Biathlon Center (cross-country skiing)
- Dates: 18–19 February 1980
- Competitors: 31 from 9 nations
- Winning Score: 432.200

Medalists
1st place, gold medalist(s)		Ulrich Wehling	East Germany
2nd place, silver medalist(s)		Jouko Karjalainen	Finland
3rd place, bronze medalist(s)		Konrad Winkler	East Germany

Nordic combined at the 1980 Winter Olympics, consisted of one event, held from 18 February to 19 February. The ski jumping portion took place at Lake Placid Olympic Ski Jumping Complex, while the cross-country portion took place at Lake Placid Olympic Sports Complex Cross Country Biathlon Center.

== Medal summary ==
=== Medal table ===
Rank	Nation	Gold	Silver	Bronze	Total
1	East Germany	1	0	1	2
2	Finland	0	1	0	1
Totals (2 entries)		1	1	1	3

=== Events ===
Event	Gold		Silver		Bronze	
Individual	Ulrich Wehling; East Germany	432.200	Jouko Karjalainen; Finland	429.500	Konrad Winkler; East Germany	425.320

== Individual ==
Athletes did three normal hill ski jumps, with the lowest score dropped. They then raced a 15 kilometre cross-country course, with the time converted to points. The athlete with the highest combined points score was awarded the gold medal.

Rank	Name	Country	Ski Jumping					Cross-country			Total
Rank	Name	Country	Jump 1	Jump 2	Jump 3	Total	Rank	Time	Points	Rank	Total
1st place, gold medalist(s)	Ulrich Wehling	East Germany	112.2	115.0	~~102.4~~	227.2	1	49:24.5	205.000	9	432.200
2nd place, silver medalist(s)	Jouko Karjalainen	Finland	108.1	~~83.2~~	101.4	209.5	7	47:44.5	220.000	1	429.500
3rd place, bronze medalist(s)	Konrad Winkler	East Germany	~~97.0~~	104.6	109.9	214.5	5	48:45.7	210.820	8	425.320
4	Tom Sandberg	Norway	~~93.7~~	104.6	99.1	203.7	9	48:19.4	214.765	5	418.465
5	Uwe Dotzauer	East Germany	112.0	105.6	~~105.0~~	217.6	4	49:52.4	200.815	13	418.415
6	Karl Lustenberger	Switzerland	104.4	108.3	~~103.3~~	212.7	6	50:01.1	199.510	14	412.210
7	Aleksandr Mayorov	Soviet Union	~~85.5~~	94.8	99.6	194.4	13	48:19.6	214.735	6	409.135
8	Gunter Schmieder	East Germany	~~97.2~~	99.9	101.8	201.7	11	49:42.0	202.375	11	404.075
9	Hubert Schwarz	West Germany	~~85.6~~	106.1	113.5	219.6	3	51:54.2	182.545	23	402.145
10	Jan Legierski	Poland	93.9	89.4	~~82.4~~	183.3	19	48:00.3	217.630	2	400.930
11	Hallstein Bøgseth	Norway	~~95.0~~	95.4	108.4	203.8	8	50:29.9	195.190	19	398.990
12	Walter Malmquist	United States	108.4	113.4	~~106.3~~	221.8	2	52:54.5	173.500	27	395.300
13	Jorma Etelälahti	Finland	91.9	100.7	~~91.5~~	192.6	14	50:02.4	199.315	15	391.915
14	Urban Hettich	West Germany	~~78.8~~	91.5	82.7	174.2	23	48:09.0	216.325	4	390.525
15	Fjodor Koltšin	Soviet Union	88.7	~~78.1~~	82.3	171.0	26	48:08.8	216.355	3	387.355
16	Hermann Weinbuch	West Germany	95.8	92.0	~~91.8~~	187.8	17	50:14.9	197.440	17	385.240
17	Józef Pawlusiak	Poland	99.2	104.4	~~99.1~~	203.6	10	52:04.5	181.000	24	384.600
18	Kerry Lynch	United States	87.6	92.7	~~85.0~~	180.3	20	49:44.3	202.030	12	382.330
19	Sergey Omelchenko	Soviet Union	~~81.2~~	85.0	91.3	176.3	21	49:33.6	203.635	10	379.935
20	Günther Abel	West Germany	~~78.8~~	86.5	98.4	184.9	18	50:53.7	191.620	22	376.520
21	Ernst Beetschen	Switzerland	~~72.3~~	87.3	83.0	170.3	27	50:09.2	198.295	16	368.595
22	Jukka Kuvaja	Finland	~~66.3~~	77.6	77.4	155.0	31	48:32.2	212.845	7	367.845
23	Rauno Miettinen	Finland	83.9	88.0	~~81.9~~	171.9	24	50:26.9	195.640	18	367.540
24	Kazimierz Długopolski	Poland	~~74.2~~	81.5	89.6	171.1	25	50:39.2	193.795	21	364.895
25	Michio Kubota	Japan	~~83.5~~	99.6	88.3	187.9	16	52:34.4	176.515	26	364.415
26	Stanisław Kawulok	Poland	~~75.0~~	82.9	86.2	169.1	28	50:30.9	195.040	20	364.140
27	Toshihiro Hanada	Japan	97.5	~~86.3~~	94.6	192.1	15	54:44.2	157.045	28	349.145
28	Gary Crawford	United States	78.8	~~77.4~~	82.9	161.7	29	52:21.3	178.480	25	340.180
29	Odd Arne Engh	Norway	~~70.7~~	99.9	100.0	199.9	12	57:56.2	128.245	29	328.145
-	Mike Devecka	United States	88.6	85.9	~~80.7~~	174.5	22	-	-	-	-
-	Arne Morten Granlien	Norway	~~76.0~~	80.5	78.0	158.5	30	-	-	-	-

== Participating NOCs ==
Nine nations participated in Nordic combined at the Lake Placid Games.

- Finland (4)
- West Germany (4)
- East Germany (4)
- Japan (2)
- Norway (4)
- Poland (4)
- Switzerland (2)
- Soviet Union (3)
- United States (4)
