= Norway at the 1988 Winter Olympics =

- IOC code: NOR
- NOC: Norwegian Olympic Committee

in Calgary, Canada 12–28 February
- Competitors: 63 (53 men, 10 women) in 7 sports
- Flag bearer: Oddvar Brå (Cross-country skiing)
- Medals Ranked 12th: Gold 0 Silver 3 Bronze 2 Total 5

Winter Olympics appearances (overview)
- 1924; 1928; 1932; 1936; 1948; 1952; 1956; 1960; 1964; 1968; 1972; 1976; 1980; 1984; 1988; 1992; 1994; 1998; 2002; 2006; 2010; 2014; 2018; 2022; 2026

Norway competed at the 1988 Winter Olympics in Calgary, Alberta, Canada. This was the first and only time at the Winter Olympics that Norway failed to win a gold medal.

== Medalists ==
Medal	Name	Sport	Event	Date
Silver	Pål Gunnar Mikkelsplass	Cross-country skiing	Men's 15 kilometre classical	19 February
Silver	Trude Dybendahl; Marit Wold; Anne Jahren; Marianne Dahlmo	Cross-country skiing	Women's 4 × 5 kilometre relay	21 February
Silver	Erik Johnsen	Ski jumping	Large hill individual	23 February
Bronze	Vegard Ulvang	Cross-country skiing	Men's 30 kilometre classical	15 February
Bronze	Ole Christian Eidhammer; Jon Inge Kjørum; Ole Gunnar Fidjestøl; Erik Johnsen	Ski jumping	Large hill team	24 February

== Competitors ==
The following is the list of number of competitors in the Games.

Sport	Men	Women	Total
Alpine skiing	3	0	3
Biathlon	6	–	6
Cross-country skiing	7	8	15
Ice hockey	23	–	23
Nordic combined	4	–	4
Ski jumping	5	–	5
Speed skating	5	2	7
Total	53	10	63

== Alpine skiing ==
Men

Athlete	Event	Race 1	Race 2	Total	
Athlete	Event	Time	Time	Time	Rank
Finn Christian Jagge	Downhill			2:07.64	35
Jan Einar Thorsen	Downhill			2:04.77	24
Atle Skårdal	Downhill			2:03.26	15
Jan Einar Thorsen	Super-G			DNF	–
Atle Skårdal	Super-G			DNF	–
Finn Christian Jagge	Super-G			DNF	–
Finn Christian Jagge	Giant Slalom	1:09.70	DNF	DNF	–
Finn Christian Jagge	Slalom	53.40	DNF	DNF	–

Men's combined

Athlete	Downhill	Slalom		Total	
Athlete	Time	Time 1	Time 2	Points	Rank
Finn Christian Jagge	1:54.66	43.35	42.79	95.21	9
Jan Einar Thorsen	1:51.89	DNF	–	DNF	–
Atle Skårdal	1:50.27	DNF	–	DNF	–

== Biathlon ==
Men

Event	Athlete	Misses ^{1}	Time	Rank
10 km Sprint	Sverre Istad	5	27:34.3	30
10 km Sprint	Eirik Kvalfoss	4	26:51.9	20
10 km Sprint	Frode Løberg	1	26:32.9	14
10 km Sprint	Geir Einang	0	26:13.3	11

Event	Athlete	Time	Misses	Adjusted time ^{2}	Rank
20 km	Sylfest Glimsdal	55:46.9	8	1'03:46.9	39
20 km	Gisle Fenne	56:56.5	5	1'01:56.5	30
20 km	Frode Løberg	56:52.7	4	1'00:52.7	20
20 km	Eirik Kvalfoss	54:54.6	3	57:54.6	6

Men's 4 x 7.5 km relay

Athletes	Race		
Athletes	Misses ^{1}	Time	Rank
Geir Einang; Frode Løberg; Gisle Fenne; Eirik Kvalfoss	0	1'25:57.0	6

^{1} A penalty loop of 150 metres had to be skied per missed target.
^{2} One minute added per missed target.

== Cross-country skiing ==
Men

Event	Athlete	Race	
Event	Athlete	Time	Rank
15 km C	Terje Langli	42:59.3	12
15 km C	Vegard Ulvang	42:31.5	7
15 km C	Oddvar Brå	42:17.3	4
15 km C	Pål Gunnar Mikkelsplass	41:33.4	2nd place, silver medalist(s)
30 km C	Martin Hole	1'31:47.5	31
30 km C	Tor Håkon Holte	1'29:59.5	21
30 km C	Pål Gunnar Mikkelsplass	1'25:44.6	6
30 km C	Vegard Ulvang	1'25:11.6	3rd place, bronze medalist(s)
50 km F	Tor Håkon Holte	2'12:56.6	31
50 km F	Torgeir Bjørn	2'08:41.0	11
50 km F	Pål Gunnar Mikkelsplass	2'08:20.0	9
50 km F	Vegard Ulvang	2'06:32.3	4

C = Classical style, F = Freestyle

Men's 4 × 10 km relay

Athletes	Race	
Athletes	Time	Rank
Pål Gunnar Mikkelsplass; Oddvar Brå; Vegard Ulvang; Terje Langli	1'46:87.7	6

Women

Event	Athlete	Race	
Event	Athlete	Time	Rank
5 km C	Brit Pettersen	15:36.7	11
5 km C	Marianne Dahlmo	15:30.4	9
5 km C	Inger Helene Nybråten	15:17.7	6
5 km C	Anne Jahren	15:12.6	4
10 km C	Anne Jahren	31:34.1	16
10 km C	Marit Wold	31:31.6	15
10 km C	Brit Pettersen	31:20.5	14
10 km C	Inger Helene Nybråten	30:51.7	6
20 km F	Marit Wold	1'00:55.0	24
20 km F	Anette Bøe	59:45.8	20
20 km F	Marit Elveos	59:33.2	18
20 km F	Marianne Dahlmo	58:31.1	8

C = Classical style, F = Freestyle

Women's 4 × 5 km relay

Athletes	Race	
Athletes	Time	Rank
Trude Dybendahl; Marit Wold; Anne Jahren; Marianne Dahlmo	1'01:33.0	2nd place, silver medalist(s)

== Ice hockey ==
=== Group B ===
Top three teams (shaded ones) entered the medal round.

	Pld	W	L	T	GF	GA	Pts
Soviet Union	5	5	0	0	32	10	10
West Germany	5	4	1	0	19	12	8
Czechoslovakia	5	3	2	0	23	14	6
United States	5	2	3	0	27	27	4
Austria	5	0	4	1	12	29	1
Norway	5	0	4	1	11	32	1

- Soviet Union 5-0 Norway
- West Germany 7-3 Norway
- Czechoslovakia 10-1 Norway
- USA 6-3 Norway
- Austria 4-4 Norway

=== Game for 11th place ===
Team 1	Score	Team 2
France	7–6 SO	Norway

Team roster

- Jarl Eriksen
- Vern Mott
- Cato Tom Andersen
- Morgan Andersen
- Tor Helge Eikeland
- Åge Ellingsen
- Tommy Skaarberg
- Truls Kristiansen
- Kim Søgaard
- Petter Salsten
- Jørgen Salsten
- Arne Billkvam
- Stephen Foyn
- Jarle Friis
- Rune Gulliksen
- Geir Hoff
- Roy Johansen
- Erik Kristiansen
- Ørjan Løvdal
- Sigurd Thinn
- Petter Thoresen
- Marius Voigt
- Lars Bergseng

- Head coach: Lennart Åhlberg

== Nordic combined ==
Men's individual

Events:

- normal hill ski jumping (Best two out of three jumps.)
- 15 km cross-country skiing (Start delay, based on ski jumping results.)

Athlete	Event	Ski Jumping		Cross-country		Total	
Athlete	Event	Points	Rank	Start at	Time	Points	Rank
Hallstein Bøgseth	Individual	197.7	22	3:25.4	43:39.4	394.450	23
Torbjørn Løkken	Individual	199.4	19	3:14.0	40:53.0	?	6
Knut Leo Abrahamsen	Individual	204.1	16	2:42.7	44:06.2	390.425	26
Trond Arne Bredesen	Individual	215.2	6	1:28.7	41:42.6	411.965	11

Men's Team

Three participants per team.

Events:

- normal hill ski jumping (Three jumps per team member per round, best two rounds counted.)
- 10 km cross-country skiing (Start delay, based on ski jumping results.)

Athletes	Ski jumping		Cross-country		Total
Athletes	Points	Rank	Start at	Time	Rank
Hallstein Bøgseth; Trond Arne Bredesen; Torbjørn Løkken	596.6	3	2:46.0	1'21:34.4	4

== Ski jumping ==
Athlete	Event	Jump 1		Jump 2		Total	
Athlete	Event	Distance	Points	Distance	Points	Points	Rank
Erik Johnsen	Normal hill	75.0	80.1	79.0	91.0	171.1	41
Ole Gunnar Fidjestøl	Normal hill	79.5	91.3	80.0	93.1	184.4	22
Ole Christian Eidhammer	Normal hill	79.5	92.3	80.5	94.4	186.7	19
Vegard Opaas	Normal hill	80.5	92.9	72.0	73.3	166.2	45
Jon Inge Kjørum	Large hill	107.0	99.2	101.5	90.0	189.2	15
Vegard Opaas	Large hill	106.0	99.8	97.5	85.4	185.2	19
Ole Christian Eidhammer	Large hill	108.5	104.8	98.0	83.1	187.9	17
Erik Johnsen	Large hill	114.5	113.7	102.0	94.2	207.9	2nd place, silver medalist(s)

Men's team large hill

Athletes	Result	
Athletes	Points ^{1}	Rank
Ole Christian Eidhammer; Jon Inge Kjørum; Ole Gunnar Fidjestøl; Erik Johnsen	596.1	3rd place, bronze medalist(s)

^{1} Four teams members performed two jumps each. The best three were counted.

== Speed skating ==
Men

Event	Athlete	Race	
Event	Athlete	Time	Rank
500 m	Bjørn Hagen	37.69	18
500 m	Frode Rønning	37.31	10
1000 m	Bjørn Hagen	DNF	–
1000 m	Rolf Falk-Larssen	1:15.42	26
1000 m	Frode Rønning	1:15.39	25
1500 m	Frode Syvertsen	1:58.37	33
1500 m	Rolf Falk-Larssen	1:55.94	21
5000 m	Frode Syvertsen	7:05.57	33
5000 m	Rolf Falk-Larssen	6:54.37	12
5000 m	Geir Karlstad	6:50.88	7
10,000 m	Geir Karlstad	DNF	–
10,000 m	Frode Syvertsen	14:32.08	21

Women

Event	Athlete	Race	
Event	Athlete	Time	Rank
500 m	Edel Therese Høiseth	40.95	14
1000 m	Edel Therese Høiseth	1:21.90	15
1500 m	Minna Nystedt	2:12.40	25
1500 m	Edel Therese Høiseth	2:09.34	20
3000 m	Minna Nystedt	4:35.35	25
5000 m	Minna Nystedt	7:54.11	24
