= Lloyd Park =

Lloyd Park may refer to:

- Lloyd Park (Croydon), England
- Lloyd Park in the grounds of the William Morris Gallery in Walthamstow, England
- Lloyd Park Disc Golf Course, Alberta, Canada
