= Nordic skiing at the 1980 Winter Olympics =

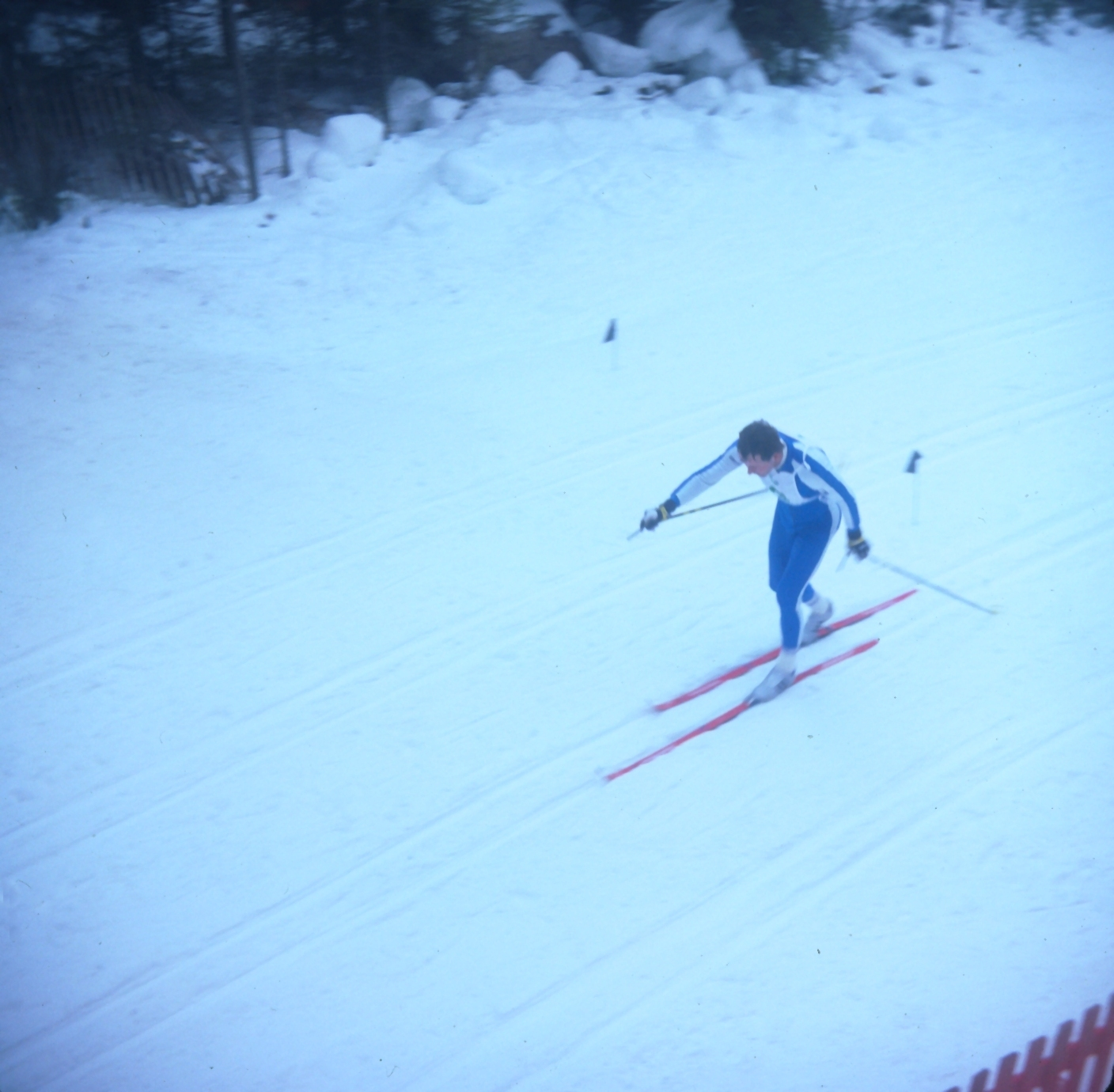
Nordic skiing event, 1980 Winter Olympics

At the 1980 Winter Olympics, ten Nordic skiing events were contested – seven cross-country skiing events, two ski jumping events, and one Nordic combined event.

| Nordic skiing discipline | Men's events | Women's events |
|---|---|---|
| Cross-country skiing | • 15 km | • 5 km |
| Cross-country skiing | • 30 km | • 10 km |
| Cross-country skiing | • 50 km | • 10 km |
| Cross-country skiing | • 4 × 10 km relay | • 4 × 5 km relay |
| Ski jumping | • Large hill | |
| Ski jumping | • Normal hill | |
| Nordic combined | • Individual | |
