= Bredesen =

Bredesen is a Norwegian surname. Notable people with the surname include:

- Espen Bredesen (born 1968), Norwegian ski jumper
- Phil Bredesen (born 1943), American politician and businessman
- Per Bredesen (1930–2022), Norwegian footballer
- Trond-Arne Bredesen (born 1967), Norwegian Nordic combined skier
