= Hanada =

Hanada (written: 花田 lit. "flower field") is a Japanese surname. Notable people with the surname include:

- Hikaru Hanada (花田 光, born 1958), Japanese voice actor
- Jukki Hanada (花田 十輝, born 1969), Japanese screenwriter
- Kiyoteru Hanada (花田 清輝, 1909–1974), Japanese literary critic and writer
- Toshihiro Hanada (花田 敏博, born 1960), Japanese Nordic combined skier
- Yuji Hanada (花田 裕治), Japanese Paralympic swimmer
- Takanohana Kenshi born Mitsuru Hanada (1950–2005), a Japanese sumo wrestler
- Takanohana Kōji born Kōji Hanada (花田 光司), a Japanese sumo wrestler, son of Takanohana Kenshi
- Wakanohana Masaru born Masaru Hanada (花田 勝), a Japanese sumo wrestler, son of Takanohana Kenshi

== Other ==
- Heike Hanada (born 1964), German architect
