= Big Thunder =

Big Thunder may refer to

- Big Thunder National Training Center, a Nordic skiing center in Thunder Bay, Ontario, Canada
  - Big Thunder Ski Jumping Center, a ski jumping hill
- Big Sky Thunder, a professional indoor football team
- Big Thunder Mountain Railroad, a ride in several Disney theme parks
- Big Thunder Ranch, an attraction in Disneyland
