= Bøgseth =

Bøgseth is a Norwegian surname. Notable people with the surname include:

- Hallstein Bøgseth (born 1954), Norwegian Nordic combined skier
- Jon Eilert Bøgseth (born 1959), Norwegian ski jumper
