= Canmore Nordic Centre Disc Golf Course =

Disc golf course in Alberta, Canada

Coordinates: 51.0903362°N 115.3877238°W

Canmore Nordic Centre is an 18-hole disc golf course located in Canmore Nordic Centre Provincial Park, in Canmore, Alberta, Canada. The course was designed in 1995 and features impressive views of the Rocky Mountains. Is widely regarded as one of the top disc golf courses in Alberta.

== See also ==
List of disc golf courses in Alberta
