= Aleksandr Mayorov (disambiguation) =

Aleksandr Mayorov is a Soviet Nordic combined skier.

Aleksandr Mayorov may also refer to:

- Aleksandr Mayorov (film director)
- Aleksandr Mayorov (general)
- Aleksandr Mayorov (historian)
- Alexander Majorov, Russia-born Swedish figure skater
