= Krugel =

Krugel or Krügel is a surname, and may refer to:

- Armin Krugel (fl. 1995), a Swiss Nordic combined skier
- Earl Krugel (1942–2005), an American coordinator for Jewish Defense League who pleaded guilty to terrorism charges in 2005
- Ellen Krügel (fl. 1957–1959), East German canoeist
- Heinz Krügel (1921–2008), German footballer

== See also ==
- Kugel
