= Pawlusiak =

Pawlusiak is a Polish-language surname. It is a patronymic surname derived from the nickname Pawluś, a diminutive from Pawel, or Paul.

Notable people with this surname include:

- Anna Pawlusiak (born 1952), Polish cross-country skier
- Józef Pawlusiak (born 1956), Polish skier
- Stanisław Pawlusiak (born 1958), Polish ski jumper
- Tadeusz Pawlusiak (1946–2011), Polish ski jumper
