= Mårdalen =

Surname list

Mårdalen is a Norwegian surname. Notable people with the surname include:

- Jon Mårdalen (1895–1977), Norwegian cross-country skier
- Kjetil Mårdalen (1925–1996), Norwegian Nordic combined skier
