= Kopal =

Kopal (feminine: Kopalová) is a Czech surname. It can be translated as both '[he] dug' and '[he] kicked'. Notable people with the surname include:

- Miroslav Kopal (born 1963), Czech Nordic combined skier
- Zdeněk Kopal (1914–1993), Czech astronomer

== See also ==
- 2628 Kopal, a minor planet named after the astronomer
