= Eikeland (surname) =

Eikeland is a surname. Notable people with the surname include:

- Amalie Eikeland (born 1995), Norwegian footballer
- Else Berit Eikeland (born 1957), Norwegian diplomat
- Karianne Eikeland (born 1972), Norwegian sailor
- Ken-Levi Eikeland (born 1995), Norwegian racing cyclist
- Olai Ingemar Eikeland (1915–2003), Norwegian politician
- Olav Eikeland (born 1955), Norwegian philosopher and working life researcher
- Tor Helge Eikeland (born 1960), Norwegian ice hockey player
