= Ernst Beetschen =

Swiss Nordic combined skier

Personal information
- Nationality: Swiss
- Born: 4 September 1953 (age 71)

Sport
- Sport: Nordic combined

Ernst Beetschen (born 4 September 1953) is a Swiss skier. He competed in the Nordic combined event at the 1980 Winter Olympics.
