= Stefan Späni =

Swiss Nordic combined skier

Personal information
- Nationality: Swiss
- Born: 17 February 1966 (age 59); Winterthur, Switzerland

Sport
- Sport: Nordic combined

Stefan Späni (born 17 February 1966) is a Swiss former skier. He competed in the Nordic combined event at the 1988 Winter Olympics.
