= Arne Morten Granlien =

Norwegian Nordic combined skier

Personal information
- Nationality: Norwegian
- Born: 6 April 1955 (age 69); Lillehammer, Norway

Sport
- Sport: Nordic combined

Arne Morten Granlien (born 6 April 1955) is a Norwegian skier. He competed in the Nordic combined event at the 1980 Winter Olympics.
