= František Repka =

Slovak Nordic combined skier

Personal information
- Nationality: Slovak
- Born: 9 January 1966 (age 60) Poprad, Czechoslovakia

Sport
- Sport: Nordic combined

František Repka is a Slovak skier. He competed in the Nordic combined event at the 1988 Winter Olympics.

Repka was born on 9 January in 1966. He played the sport Nordic Combined and finished #30 playing from the team TCH.
