= Sergey Omelchenko =

Soviet skier (born 1953)

Personal information
- Nationality: Soviet
- Born: 16 February 1953 (age 73)

Sport
- Sport: Nordic combined

Sergey Omelchenko (born 16 February 1953) is a Soviet skier. He competed in the Nordic combined event at the 1980 Winter Olympics.
