= Luboš Jíra (luger, born 1968) =

Czech luger

Personal information
- Nationality: Czech
- Born: 30 August 1968 (age 58)

Sport
- Sport: Luge

Luboš Jíra (born 30 August 1968) is a Czech luger. He competed in the men's singles and doubles events at the 1988 Winter Olympics. His son competed in the luge at the 2010 Winter Olympics.
