= Josef Adolf =

Czechoslovak Nordic combined skier (1898–1951)

Medal record

Men's Nordic combined

World Championships
Silver medal – second place	1925 Johannisbad	Individual

Josef Adolf (14 May 1898 – 30 November 1951) was an ethnic German Nordic combined skier who competed for Czechoslovakia in the 1920s.

Adolf was born in Velká Úpa (Pec pod Sněžkou), Austria-Hungary in May 1898. At the 1924 Winter Olympics he finished sixth in the Nordic combined event. He won a silver medal in the Nordic combined at the 1925 FIS Nordic World Ski Championships in Johannisbad.

He died in Viechtach, Germany on 30 November 1951, at the age of 53.
