= Jon Servold =

Canadian Nordic combined skier

Personal information
- Born: 27 November 1960 (age 64); Camrose, Alberta, Canada

Sport
- Sport: Nordic combined

Jon Servold (born 27 November 1960) is a Canadian skier. He competed in the Nordic combined event at the 1988 Winter Olympics.
