= Sergey Nikiforov =

Soviet Nordic combined skier

Personal information
- Nationality: Soviet
- Born: 15 May 1966 (age 58); Moscow, Russian SFSR, Soviet Union

Sport
- Sport: Nordic combined

Sergey Nikiforov (born 15 May 1966) is a Soviet former skier. He competed in the Nordic combined event at the 1988 Winter Olympics.
