= Tadeusz Bafia =

Polish Nordic combined skier

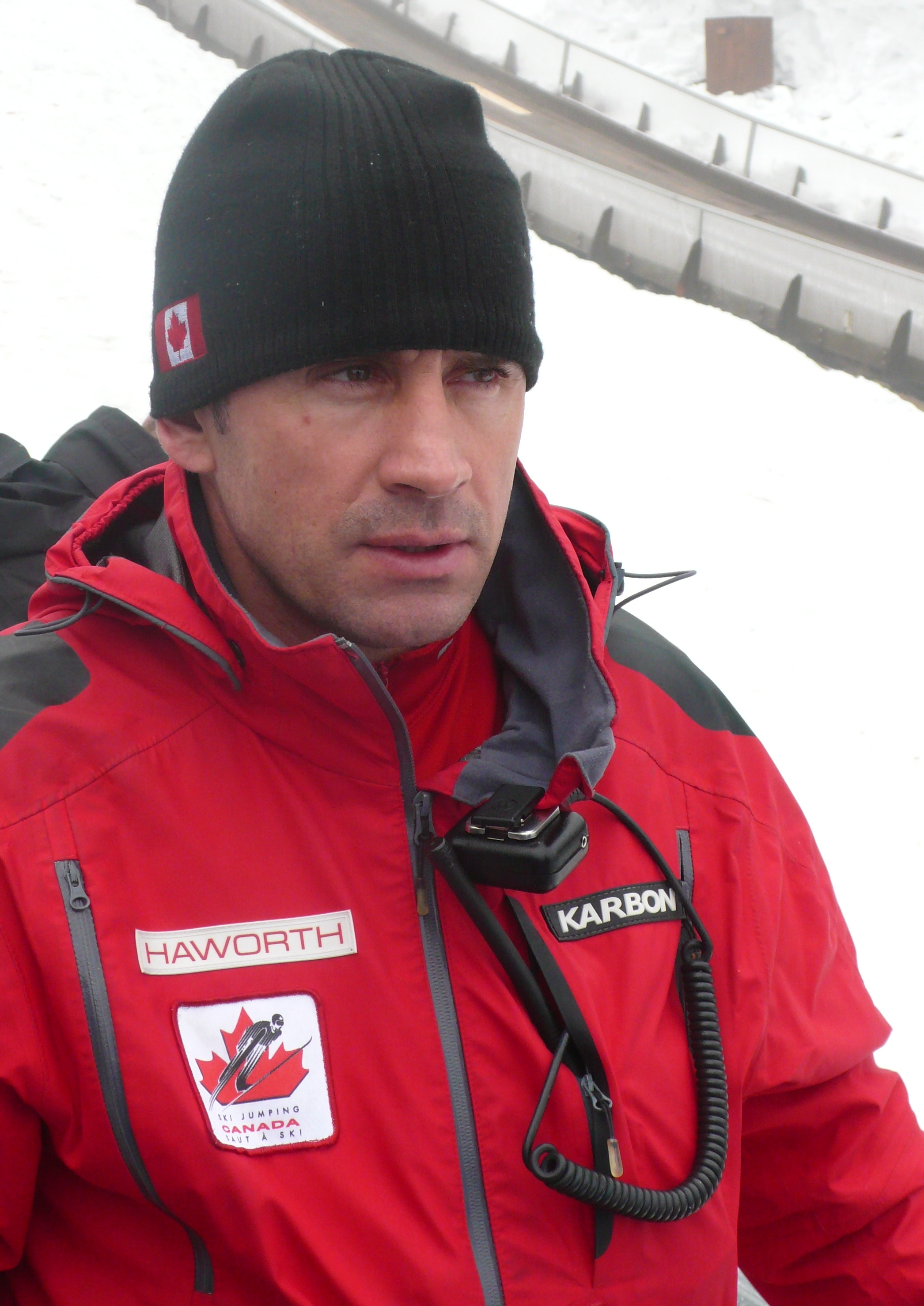
- Tadeusz Bafia in 2011

Personal information
- Nationality: Polish
- Born: 18 September 1964 (age 60); Nowy Targ, Poland

Sport
- Sport: Nordic combined

Tadeusz Bafia (born 18 September 1964) is a Polish skier. He competed in the Nordic combined event at the 1988 Winter Olympics.
