= Toshihiro Hanada =

Japanese Nordic combined skier

Personal information
- Nationality: Japanese
- Born: 7 August 1960 (age 64); Aomori, Japan

Sport
- Sport: Nordic combined

Toshihiro Hanada (花田 敏博, Hanada Toshihiro, born 7 August 1960) is a Japanese skier. He competed in the Nordic combined event at the 1980 Winter Olympics.
