= Alois Schwarz =

Austrian cross-country skier

Personal information
- Nationality: Austrian
- Born: 16 June 1965; Linz, Austria
- Died: January 1999

Sport
- Sport: Cross-country skiing

Alois Schwarz (16 June 1965 – January 1999) was an Austrian cross-country skier. He competed at the 1988 Winter Olympics and the 1992 Winter Olympics.
