= Lloyd Park Disc Golf Course =

Disc golf course in Alberta, Canada

Coordinates: 50.8802°N 114.1615°W

Lloyd Park Disc Golf Course is an 18-hole disc golf course located in Calgary, Alberta, Canada. The course was designed by the Calgary Disc Golf Club in 2015. It features concrete tees and pro baskets.

== Tournaments ==
The course is home to the PDGA-sanctioned Alberta Open tournament.

== See also ==
- List of disc golf courses in Alberta
