= André Blatter =

Austrian cross-country skier (born 1965)

Personal information
- Nationality: Austrian
- Born: 29 June 1965 (age 59); Bern, Switzerland

Sport
- Sport: Cross-country skiing

André Blatter (born 29 June 1965) is an Austrian cross-country skier. He competed in the men's 15 kilometre classical event at the 1988 Winter Olympics.
