= Silvio Szybisti =

Austrian ice hockey player

Personal information
- Nationality: Austrian
- Born: 1 January 1962 (age 64) Salzburg, Austria

Sport
- Sport: Ice hockey

Silvio Szybisti (born 1 January 1962) is an Austrian ice hockey player. He competed in the men's tournament at the 1988 Winter Olympics.
