= Dmitry Sinitsyn =

Russian Nordic combined skier

Medal record

Men's Nordic combined

World Championships
Bronze medal – third place	1999 Ramsau	15 km individual
Bronze medal – third place	1999 Ramsau	4 x 5 km team

Dmitry Vladimirovich Sinitzyn (Russian: Дмитрий Владимирович Синицын; born 29 October 1973 in Yekaterinburg) is a Russian Nordic combined athlete who competed from 1997 to 2002. He won two bronze medals at the 1999 FIS Nordic World Ski Championships in Ramsau (15 km individual and 4 x 5 km team).

Sinitzyn also earned three individual career victories in 1997 (two individual, one sprint).
