= Józef Pawlusiak =

Polish Nordic combined skier

Personal information
- Nationality: Polish
- Born: 16 September 1956 (age 68); Wilkowice, Poland

Sport
- Sport: Nordic combined

Józef Pawlusiak (born 16 September 1956) is a Polish skier. He competed in the Nordic combined event at the 1980 Winter Olympics.
