= Hans Sulzer =

Austrian ice hockey player

Personal information
- Nationality: Austrian
- Born: 22 December 1969 (age 56) Klagenfurt, Austria

Sport
- Sport: Ice hockey

Hans Sulzer (born 22 December 1969) is an Austrian ice hockey player. He competed in the men's tournament at the 1988 Winter Olympics.
