= Sami Leinonen =

Finnish Nordic combined skier

Sami Petri Tapani Leinonen (born 30 September 1963) is a retired Finnish Nordic combined skier.

Representing the sports club Lahden Hiihtoseura, he competed in the Nordic Combined World Cup from the mid-1980s to around 1990. He finished 17th in the individual race at the 1988 Winter Olympics. His best individual World Cup finish was third place at a 15 km individual event in Sweden in 1988.
