= Hideki Miyazaki =

Japanese Nordic combined skier (born 1962)

Personal information
- Nationality: Japanese
- Born: 29 September 1962 (age 62); Hokkaido, Japan

Sport
- Sport: Nordic combined

Hideki Miyazaki (宮崎 秀基, Miyazaki Hideki, born 29 September 1962) is a Japanese skier. He competed in the Nordic combined event at the 1988 Winter Olympics.
