= Andreas Salat =

Austrian ice hockey player

Personal information
- Nationality: Austrian
- Born: 5 June 1964 (age 61) Vienna, Austria

Sport
- Sport: Ice hockey

Andreas Salat (born 5 June 1964) is an Austrian ice hockey player. He competed in the men's tournament at the 1988 Winter Olympics.
