= Hans Johnstone =

American Nordic combined skier (born 1961)

Hans Johnstone (born May 29, 1961) is an American former Nordic combined skier who competed in the 1988 Winter Olympics.
