= Günter Koren =

Austrian ice hockey player

Personal information
- Nationality: Austrian
- Born: 30 July 1962 (age 63) Klagenfurt, Austria

Sport
- Sport: Ice hockey

Günter Koren (born 30 July 1962) is an Austrian ice hockey player. He competed in the men's tournament at the 1988 Winter Olympics.
