= Konrad Winkler (skier) =

East German Nordic combined skier

Medal record

Men's Nordic combined

Representing East Germany

Olympic Games
Bronze medal – third place	1976 Innsbruck	Individual
Bronze medal – third place	1980 Lake Placid	Individual

World Championships
Gold medal – first place	1978 Lahti	Individual
Gold medal – first place	1982 Oslo	3 x 10 km team
Silver medal – second place	1982 Oslo	15 km individual

Konrad Winkler (born 17 February 1955 in Neuhausen) is a former East German Nordic combined skier who competed during the late 1970s and early 1980s.

He won a gold medal in the Nordic combined Individual event at the 1978 FIS Nordic World Ski Championships in Lahti, then finished second behind Tom Sandberg in the same event in 1982. Winkler earned bronzes in the Individual Nordic combined events at the 1976 Winter Olympics and at the 1980 Winter Olympics. Winkler won gold in the 3 x 10 km event at the 1982 championships.
