= Michael Shea (ice hockey) =

Austrian ice hockey player

Personal information
- Nationality: Austrian
- Born: 4 June 1961 (age 63); Montreal, Quebec, Canada

Sport
- Sport: Ice hockey

Michael Shea (born 4 June 1961) is an Austrian ice hockey player. He competed in the men's tournaments at the 1988 Winter Olympics and the 1994 Winter Olympics.
