= List of disc golf courses in Alberta =

According to the PDGA Website, as of July 2023, there are 70 known disc golf courses in Alberta on the official PDGA Course Directory. 35 of them (50%) are full-size courses with 18 holes or more. Alberta has 16 courses per million inhabitants, compared to the Canadian average of 6.7.

From U-disc- Ranked as the 3rd best disc golf province in Canada, Alberta has 137 courses. Among these are 52 courses which have 18 or more holes. Alberta is also home to 104 leagues and 30 stores that sell disc golf gear.

Disc golf courses in Alberta

List of disc golf courses in Alberta as of 2023
Course	Est.	City	State/Province	# Holes
22 Birdwalk		Sundre	Alberta	9
4 Wing Disc Golf Course		Cold Lake	Alberta	9
Alberta Badlands Disc Golf Course		Wayne	Alberta	18
Aperture Park - University of Lethbridge		Lethbridge	Alberta	18
Aspen Meadows - East		Sundre	Alberta	18
Aspen Meadows - West		Sundre	Alberta	18
Bailey's Crossing Disc Golf Course		Spruce Grove	Alberta	18
Baker Park		Calgary	Alberta	18
Barnwell Disc Golf Course		Barnwell	Alberta	6
Bonnyville Baptist Disc Golf Course	2022	Bonnyville	Alberta	9
Bud Miller Disc Golf		Lloydminster	Alberta	9
Canmore Nordic Centre		Canmore	Alberta	18
Central Park		Medicine Hat	Alberta	9
Co-op Community Disc Golf Course		Grande Prairie	Alberta	18
Cochrane Disc Golf Course		Cochrane	Alberta	9
Community Park		High Level	Alberta	9
Currie Reservoir		Calgary	Alberta	21
David Richardson Memorial Disc Golf Park		Calgary	Alberta	18
David Thompson Resort & Campground		Nordegg	Alberta	9
Drayton Valley Top Gun Course		Rocky Rapids	Alberta	18
Eagles Landing Disc Golf Course		Cherhill	Alberta	18
Eastview Middle School		Red Deer	Alberta	6
Edgemont Disc Golf Course		Calgary	Alberta	11
Elkwater Disc Golf Course		Elkwater	Alberta	9
Forest Lawn		Calgary	Alberta	9
Four Seasons Disc Golf Course		Beaumont	Alberta	9
Gillwell Park		Medicine Hat	Alberta	9
Granview Park Disc Golf		Granum	Alberta	9
Hermitage Park Disc Golf Course		Edmonton	Alberta	18
Diamond Valley Disc Golf Course		Diamond Valley	Alberta	18
Hinton Disc Golf Course		Hinton	Alberta	18
Innisfail Kinsmen Disc Golf Park		innisfail	Alberta	9
Jubilee Park		Spruce Grove	Alberta	9
Kentwood Disc Golf Course		Red Deer	Alberta	9
Kitscoty Disc Golf Course		Kitscoty	Alberta	18
Lake Sundance		Calgary	Alberta	6
Lee Creek Campground Family Reunion Centre		Cardston	Alberta	9
Leinweber Park		Medicine Hat	Alberta	9
Lethbridge West Lions Club Disc Golf Course		Lethbridge	Alberta	18
Lions Rotary Disc Golf		Fort McMurray	Alberta	6
Lloyd Park		Calgary	Alberta	18
Middle Earth Disc Golf Course		Keephills	Alberta	18
Midland Provincial Park		Drumheller	Alberta	18
Midnapore Park		Calgary	Alberta	9
Nicholas Sheran Park		Lethbridge	Alberta	18
Norwester		Edmonton	Alberta	9
Oxbow Country Disc Golf		Strathmore	Alberta	18
Park 96		Calgary	Alberta	18
Pothole Creek Disc Golf Course		Magrath	Alberta	18
Red Tail Ridge		Calgary	Alberta	18
Redwood Meadows Disc Golf Course		Redwood Meadows	Alberta	11
Riverside Disc Golf Course		Okotoks	Alberta	9
Rocky Lane Fairways and Recreation		Athabasca	Alberta	18
Rotary Links Disc Golf Course		Fort McMurray	Alberta	9
Rundle Park Disc Golf Course		Edmonton	Alberta	18
South Bear Creek		Grande Prairie	Alberta	18
Stone Creek Disc Golf		Fort McMurray	Alberta	36
Stoney Creek Disc Golf Course	2021	Camrose	Alberta	9
Strathcona Wilderness Centre		Ardrossan	Alberta	9
Strathmore Disc Golf Course		Strathmore	Alberta	18
Sylvan Lake Disc Golf Course		Sylvan Lake	Alberta	18
The Hills Disc Golf Course		Edmonton	Alberta	9
Thorncliffe Disc Golf Course		Calgary	Alberta	9
Three Hills Disc Golf Course		Three Hills	Alberta	9
Three Sisters		Canmore	Alberta	12
Thrill Hill		Grand Prairie	Alberta	18
Victoria Park		Red Deer	Alberta	18
Walters Green (Hartman Green)		Olds	Alberta	9
Water-In-View at Fred Johns Park		Leduc	Alberta	9
Wetaskiwin Disc Golf Course	2005	Wetaskiwin	Alberta	18
Wildman Disc Golf		Bon Accord	Alberta	18
WJ Homestead Disc Golf Course		Foothills	Alberta	18

== See also ==
List of disc golf courses in Canada
