= Manfred Mühr =

Austrian ice hockey player

Personal information
- Nationality: Austrian
- Born: 31 May 1967 (age 58) Vienna, Austria

Sport
- Sport: Ice hockey

Manfred Mühr (born 31 May 1967) is an Austrian ice hockey player. He competed in the men's tournaments at the 1988 Winter Olympics and the 1994 Winter Olympics.
