= Johann Standmann =

Austrian cross-country skier

Personal information
- Nationality: Austrian
- Born: 11 April 1963 (age 61)

Sport
- Sport: Cross-country skiing

Johann Standmann (born 11 April 1963) is an Austrian cross-country skier. He competed in the men's 15 kilometre classical event at the 1988 Winter Olympics.
