= Stefan Wittwer =

Swiss Nordic combined skier (born 1971)

Medal record

Men's Nordic combined

World Championships
Bronze medal – third place	1995 Thunder Bay	4 x 5 km team

Stefan Wittwer (born 26 March 1971) is a Swiss Nordic combined skier who competed in 1995 and 1996. He won a bronze medal in the 4 x 5 km team event at the 1995 FIS Nordic World Ski Championships in Thunder Bay, Ontario.

Wittwer's best individual finish was 2nd in the 15 km individual in Oberhof, Germany in 1996.
