= Big Thunder National Training Center =

Nordic skiing complex in Thunder Bay, Ontario

Coordinates: 48°17′15″N 89°23′00″W

Big Thunder National Training Center is a Nordic skiing complex located in Thunder Bay, Ontario, Canada. It was opened in 1963, and closed in 1995. The centerpiece was the Big Thunder Ski Jumping Center, which had K-90 and K-120 hills. The center hosted the FIS Nordic World Ski Championships 1995.
