= Christian Eminger =

Austrian speed skater

Christian Eminger (born 21 October 1964 in Baden, Switzerland) is a former ice speed skater from Austria. He represented Austria in three Winter Olympics, starting in 1984 in Sarajevo, Yugoslavia.

After his skating career, Eminger remained a competitive road bicycle rider. He is winner of the 2007 annual amateur ranking in Switzerland and two-times winner of the UCI Masters World Championship.
