= Hans-Peter Pohl =

German Nordic combined skier

Medal record

Men's Nordic combined

Olympic Games
Gold medal – first place	1988 Calgary	3 x 10 km team

World Championships
Gold medal – first place	1987 Oberstdorf	3 x 10 km team
Bronze medal – third place	1993 Falun	3 x 10 km team

Hans-Peter Pohl (born 30 January 1965 in Triberg im Schwarzwald) is a former German Nordic combined skier who competed during the late 1980s and early 1990s. He won the 3 x 10 km team event at the 1988 Winter Olympics in Calgary with teammates Thomas Müller and Hubert Schwarz. Pohl also won two medals in the 3 x 10 km team events at the FIS Nordic World Ski Championships with a gold in 1987 (with West Germany) and a bronze in 1993 (with a unified Germany).
