= Gert Kompajn =

Austrian ice hockey player

Personal information
- Nationality: Austrian
- Born: 13 September 1960 (age 65) Klagenfurt, Austria

Sport
- Sport: Ice hockey

Achievements and titles
- Olympic finals: 1988 Winter Olympics

Gert Kompajn (born 13 September 1960) is an Austrian ice hockey player. He competed in the men's tournament at the 1988 Winter Olympics.
