= Espen Andersen =

Norwegian Nordic combined skier

Medal record

Men's Nordic combined

World Championships
Silver medal – second place	1982 Oslo	3 x 10 km team
Silver medal – second place	1985 Seefeld	3 x 10 km team

Espen Andersen (born July 12, 1961) is a Norwegian Nordic combined skier who competed from 1982 to 1987. He won the 3 x 10 km silver medal at the 1982 FIS Nordic World Ski Championships and the silver medal in 1985.

Andersen's first victories was at the 1984 Holmenkollen ski festival, the World Cup in Falun in 1983, and at the World Cup in Sapporo in 1983. His strength was in the jumping hill. He also had three individual World Cup victories through his career. He is the brother of ski jumper Geir Andersen.
