= Canmore Nordic Centre Provincial Park =

Provincial park in Alberta, Canada

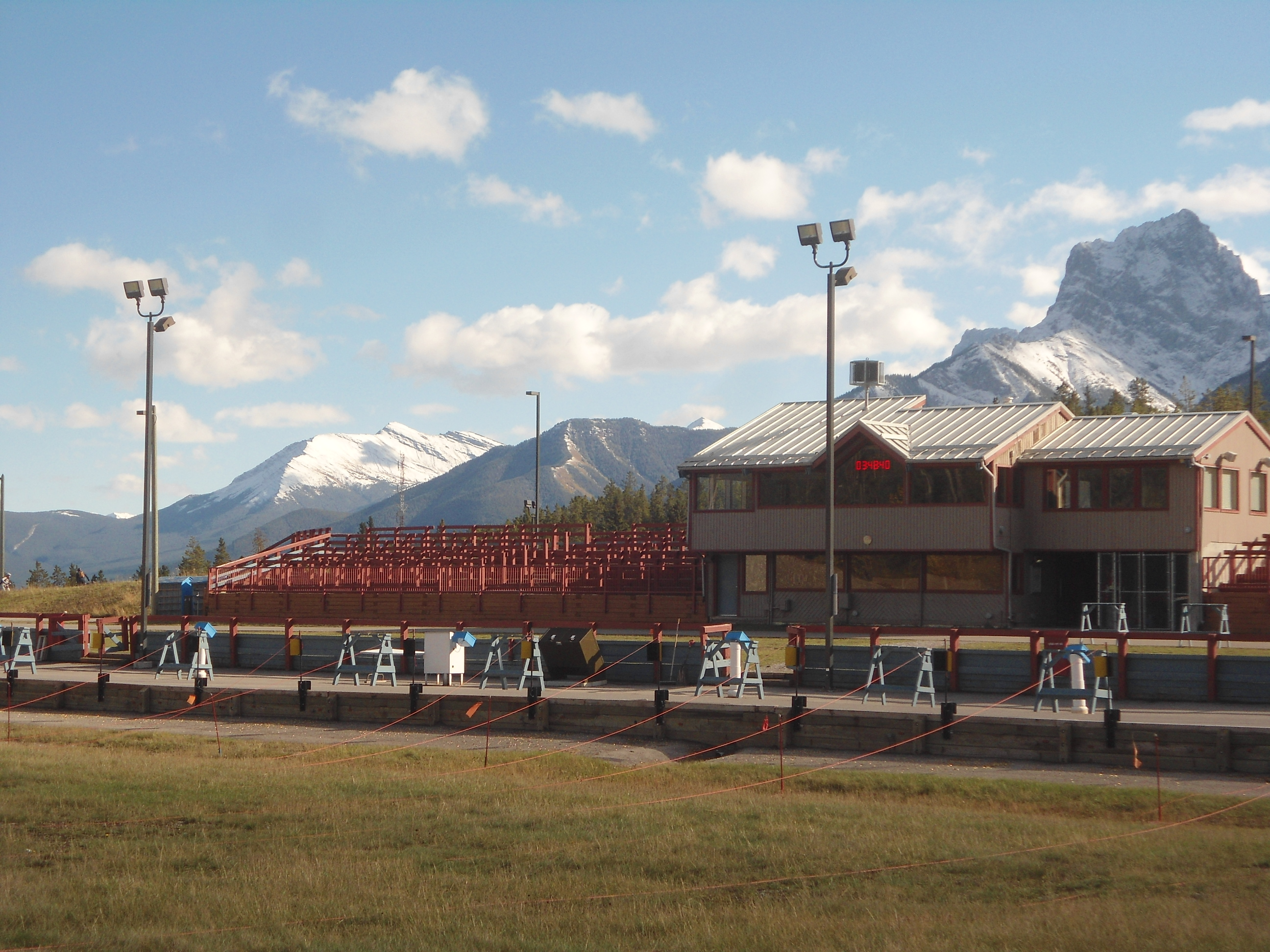
- Canmore Nordic Centre

- Location within Kananaskis Improvement District Location within Alberta
- Interactive map of Canmore Nordic Centre Provincial Park
- Location: Kananaskis, Alberta
- Nearest city: Canmore
- Coordinates: 51°05′33″N 115°23′24″W
- Area: 4.5 km^{2} (1.7 sq mi)
- Established: 1988
- Governing body: Alberta Tourism, Parks and Recreation

Canmore Nordic Centre Provincial Park is a provincial park in Alberta, Canada, located immediately west of Canmore, 105 km (65 mi) west of Calgary.

This provincial park is situated at the foot of Mount Rundle within the Canadian Rocky Mountains along Bow Valley and the Trans-Canada Highway, at an elevation of 1,400 m (4,600 ft), and has a surface of 4.5 km^{2} (1.7 sq mi). It is part of Kananaskis Country's park system.

== 1988 Olympics ==
The Canmore Nordic Centre was originally constructed for the 1988 Winter Olympics. The cross-country skiing, biathlon and cross-country skiing part of the Nordic combined events were held there.

== 1991 Winter Deaflympics ==
The centre also hosted the giant slalom and slalom events for the Banff 1991 Winter Deaflympics, in the Olympic tracks area.

== Amenities ==
The Canmore Nordic Centre provides trails for use by cross-country skiers, mountain bikers, and hikers. The park also features a disc golf course.

The centre was re-developed for the 2005 Cross-country World Cup and future international events. The Nordic Centre hosts national training camps for Canada's biathlon and cross-country ski teams, in addition to providing winter and summer recreational facilities to the general public.

== See also ==
- List of provincial parks in Alberta
- List of Canadian provincial parks
- List of National Parks of Canada
