= Tor Helge Eikeland =

Norwegian ice hockey player

Personal information
- Born: 28 June 1960 (age 65) Oslo, Norway

Sport
- Sport: Ice hockey

Tor Helge Eikeland (born 28 June 1960) is a Norwegian former ice hockey player. He was born in Oslo, Norway. He played for the Norwegian national ice hockey team at the 1988 Winter Olympics.
