= Gary Crawford (skier) =

American Nordic combined skier (born 1957)

E. Gary Crawford (born August 30, 1957, in Denver, Colorado) is an American former Nordic combined skier who competed in the 1980 Winter Olympics and in the 1988 Winter Olympics.
