= Ladislav Patráš =

Slovak Nordic combined skier

Personal information
- Nationality: Slovak
- Born: 19 July 1967 (age 59) Banská Bystrica, Czechoslovakia

Sport
- Sport: Nordic combined

Ladislav Patráš (born 19 July 1967) was a Slovak Nordic combined skier who competed for Czechoslovakia in the late 1980s. He finished sixth in the 3 × 10 km team event at the 1988 Winter Olympics in Calgary.
