= Todd Wilson (skier) =

American former Nordic combined skier (born 1965)

Todd Wilson (born May 4, 1965) is an American former Nordic combined skier who competed in the 1988 Winter Olympics and in the 1992 Winter Olympics.
