= Armin Krugel =

Swiss Nordic combined skier

Medal record

Men's Nordic combined

World Championships
Bronze medal – third place	1995 Thunder Bay	4 x 5 km team

Armin Krugel is a Swiss Nordic combined skier who competed in 1995. He won a bronze medal in the 4 x 5 km team event at the 1995 FIS Nordic World Ski Championships in Thunder Bay, Ontario.

Krugel's only individual victory came earlier that same year in Calgary in the 15 km individual.
