= Kjetil Mårdalen =

Norwegian Nordic combined skier

Medal record

Men's Nordic combined

World Championships
Bronze medal – third place	1954 Falun	Individual

Kjetil Mårdalen (12 January 1925 – 4 November 1996) was a Norwegian Nordic combined skier who competed in the 1950s. He won a bronze medal in the individual event at the 1954 FIS Nordic World Ski Championships in Falun.

Mårdalen finished 14th in the individual event at the 1956 Winter Olympics in Cortina d'Ampezzo.
