= Alexander Mayorov =

Soviet Nordic combined skier

Medal record

Men'sNordic combined

World Championships
| Bronze medal – third place | 1984 Rovaniemi | 3 x 10 km team |

Alexander Borisovich Mayorov (Russian: Алекса́ндр Борисович Майо́ров) (born June 6, 1957) is a former Soviet Nordic combined skier who competed in the early 1980s. He finished sixth in the individual event at the 1980 Winter Olympics in Lake Placid. He won a bronze medal in the 3x10 km team event at the 1984 FIS Nordic World Ski Championships in Rovaniemi.

Mayorov finished 14th in the individual event at the 1984 Winter Olympics in Sarajevo. His best individual finish was 7th in East Germany in 1983.
