= Uwe Prenzel =

East German-German Nordic combined skier

Uwe Prenzel (born 15 June 1966) is an East German-German Nordic combined skier who competed from 1987 to 1992. At the 1988 Winter Olympics in Calgary, he finished fourth in the 15 km individual and fifth in the 3 x 10 km team event.

Prenzel also competed in the 3 x 10 km team event at the 1987 FIS Nordic World Ski Championships in Oberstdorf. His best individual World Cup finish was third place at a 15 km individual event in Norway in 1988.

Prenzel had two individual career victories, earned both in 15 km individual World Cup B events in 1992.
