= Jan Klimko =

Slovak Nordic combined skier (born 1960)

Jan Klimko (born 30 July 1960 in Prešov) was a Slovak Nordic combined skier who competed for Czechoslovakia in the late 1980s. He finished sixth in the 3 x 10 km team event at the 1988 Winter Olympics in Calgary.
