= Vasily Savin =

Soviet Nordic combined skier

Personal information
- Nationality: Soviet
- Born: 2 April 1967 (age 57); Murmansk, Russian SFSR, Soviet Union

Sport
- Sport: Nordic combined

Vasily Savin (born 2 April 1967) is a Soviet former skier. He competed in the Nordic combined events at the 1988 Winter Olympics and the 1992 Winter Olympics.
