= Knut Leo Abrahamsen =

Norwegian Nordic combined skier

Personal information
- Born: 2 September 1962 (age 62); Alta, Norway

Sport
- Sport: Nordic combined skiing

Knut Leo Abrahamsen (born 2 September 1962) is a Norwegian Nordic combined skier. He was born in Alta Municipality in Finnmark county. He represented the club Alta IF. He competed at the 1988 Winter Olympics in Calgary, where he placed 26th.
