= Hansjörg Aschenwald =

Austrian Nordic combined skier

Medal record

Men's Nordic combined

Representing Austria

Olympic Games
Bronze medal – third place	1988 Calgary	3 x 10 km team

Hansjörg Aschenwald (born 28 June 1965) is an Austrian Nordic combined skier who competed during the late 1980s and early 1990s. He won a bronze medal in the 3 x 10 km team event at the 1988 Winter Olympics in Calgary.

His son, Philipp Aschenwald, is also a ski jumper, who made his World Cup debut in 2016 at Bischofshofen ski jumping hill.
