= Fredy Glanzmann =

Swiss Nordic combined skier

Medal record

Men's Nordic combined

Olympic Games
Silver medal – second place	1988 Calgary	3 x 10 km team

World Championships
Silver medal – second place	1989 Lahti	3 x 10 km team

Fredy Glanzmann (born 16 July 1963) is a Swiss former Nordic combined skier who competed during the 1980s. He won a silver medal in the 3 x 10 km team event at the 1988 Winter Olympics in Calgary and also won a silver medal in the 3 x 10 km team event at the 1989 FIS Nordic World Ski Championships.
