= Günther Csar =

Austrian Nordic combined skier (born 1966)

Medal record

Men's Nordic combined

Olympic Games
Bronze medal – third place	1988 Calgary	3 x 10 km team

World Championships
Gold medal – first place	1991 Val di Fiemme	3 x 10 km team

Günther Csar (born 7 March 1966, in Zell am Ziller) is a former Austrian Nordic combined skier who competed during the late 1980s and early 1990s. He won a bronze medal in the 3 x 10 km team event at the 1988 Winter Olympics in Calgary and also won a gold medal in the 3 x 10 km team event at the 1991 FIS Nordic World Ski Championships in Val di Fiemme.
