= Miroslav Kopal =

Miroslav Kopal (born 17 January 1963) was a Czech Nordic combined skier. He competed for Czechoslovakia and the Czech Republic from 1984 to 1996. At the 1988 Winter Olympics in Calgary, he finished sixth in the 3 × 10 km and seventh in the 15 km individual events. He also competed in the 1994 Winter Olympics.

Kopal's best individual finish at the FIS Nordic World Ski Championships was fifth in the 15 kn individual at Lahti in 1989. His best World Cup finish was fourth twice both in 15 km individual events in 1988.
