= Hippolyt Kempf =

Swiss skier (born 1965)

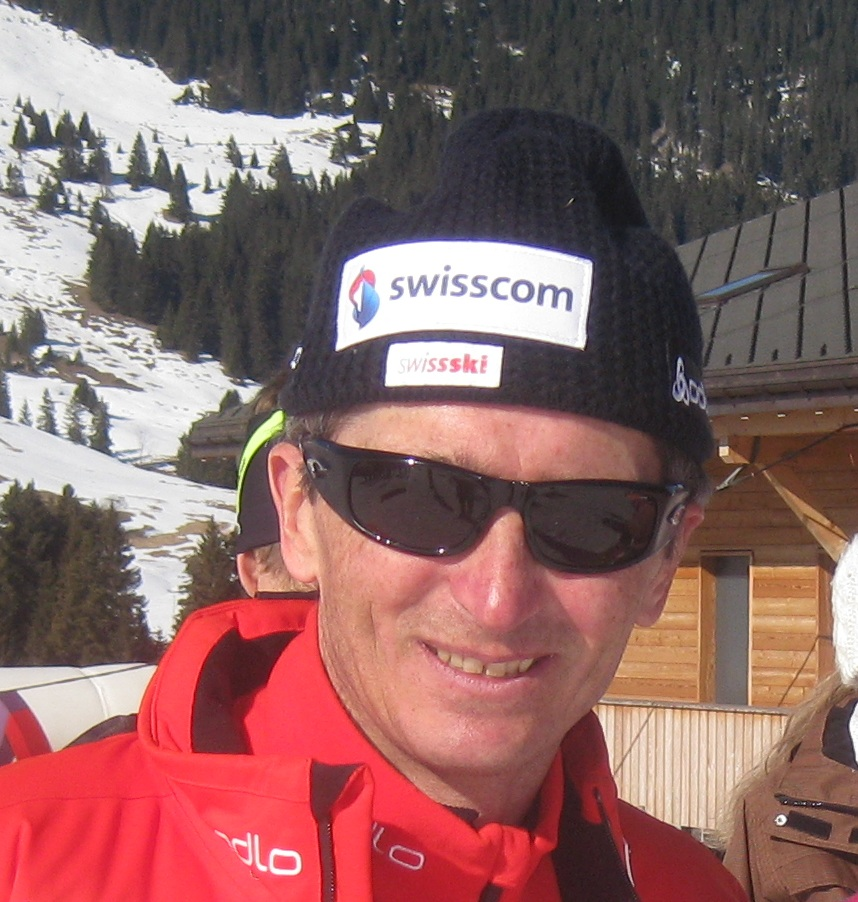

Medal record

Men's Nordic combined

Olympic Games
Gold medal – first place	1988 Calgary	15 km individual
Silver medal – second place	1988 Calgary	3 x 10 km team
Bronze medal – third place	1994 Lillehammer	3 x 10 km team

World Championships
Silver medal – second place	1989 Lahti	3 x 10 km team

Hippolyt Kempf (born 10 December 1965, in Lucerne) is a Swiss Nordic combined skier who competed during the late 1980s and early 1990s.

He won a complete set of Olympic medals, earning two of them at the 1988 Winter Olympics in Calgary (gold: 15 km individual, silver: 3 x 10 km team) and the third at the 1994 Winter Olympics in Lillehammer (bronze: 3 x 10 km team).

Kempf also earned a 3 x 10 km team silver medal at the 1989 FIS Nordic World Ski Championships in Lahti.

Awards
Preceded by (Switzerland) Werner Günthör	Swiss Sportsman of the Year; 1988	Succeeded by (Switzerland) Tony Rominger
