= Nordic combined at the 1988 Winter Olympics =

Nordic combined at the XV Olympic Winter Games
- Pictogram for Nordic combined
- Venue: Canada Olympic Park (ski jumping); Canmore Nordic Centre (cross-country skiing)
- Dates: February 23–28, 1988
- Competitors: 44 from 13 nations

Nordic combined at the 1988 Winter Olympics consisted of two events, held from 23 February to 28 February. The ski jumping portion took place at Canada Olympic Park, while the cross-country portion took place at Canmore Nordic Centre.

The Calgary Games saw two substantial changes in the Nordic combined program. A team event was added, marking the first time that more than one medal would be awarded in Nordic combined. The combined events also changed their format, replacing the points-based system used in previous years with the Gundersen method, in which ski jumping points totals were translated to time gaps for a pursuit cross-country race. This change ensured that the first competitor across the finish line in the cross-country race was the overall Olympic champion.

== Medal summary ==
=== Medal table ===
Rank	Nation	Gold	Silver	Bronze	Total
1	Switzerland	1	1	0	2
2	West Germany	1	0	0	1
3	Austria	0	1	1	2
4	Soviet Union	0	0	1	1
Totals (4 entries)		2	2	2	6

Switzerland topped the medal table with two, one gold. Austria's two medals were the country's first in the sport.

=== Events ===
Event	Gold		Silver		Bronze	
Individual	Hippolyt Kempf; Switzerland	39:27.5	Klaus Sulzenbacher; Austria	39:46.5	Allar Levandi; Soviet Union	40:31.8
Team	West Germany; Hans-Peter Pohl; Hubert Schwarz; Thomas Müller	1:20:46.0	Switzerland; Andreas Schaad; Hippolyt Kempf; Fredy Glanzmann	1:20:49.4	Austria; Günther Csar; Hansjörg Aschenwald; Klaus Sulzenbacher	1:21:16.9

== Participating NOCs ==
Thirteen nations participated in Nordic combined at the Calgary Games.

- Austria (4)
- Canada (1)
- Finland (4)
- France (1)
- West Germany (4)
- East Germany (4)
- Japan (3)
- Norway (4)
- Poland (1)
- Switzerland (4)
- Czechoslovakia (4)
- Soviet Union (4)
- United States (4)
