= Torbjørn Løkken =

Norwegian Nordic combined skier (born 1963)

Personal information
- Born: 28 June 1963 (age 63) Biri, Norway
- Height: 175 cm (5 ft 9 in)
- Weight: 66 kg (146 lb)

Sport
- Sport: Nordic combined
- Club: Biri Idrettslag
Medal record
Representing Norway
World Championships
Gold medal – first place	1987 Oberstdorf	15 km individual
Silver medal – second place	1987 Oberstdorf	3×10 km team

Torbjørn Løkken (born 28 June 1963) is a Norwegian Nordic combined skier who competed from 1985 to 1990. He won two medals at the 1987 FIS Nordic World Ski Championships in Oberstdorf with a gold in the 15 km individual and a silver in the 3×5 km team events.

Løkken also competed at the 1988 Winter Olympics in Calgary, finishing sixth in the individual and fourth in the team events. He also won the Nordic combined event at the 1988 Holmenkollen ski festival and earned four additional individual victories in his career from 1986 to 1988. He took a year off after the 1987–88 season, and attempted a comeback in 1989–90, but quit midway through the season, claiming he no longer had the motivation to compete.

He has his education from the Norwegian School of Sport Sciences.

After retiring from the sport, Løkken had a troubled life. In November 2007, he came forward and revealed that he was a recovering alcoholic and drug addict, having abused alcohol, pills and eventually heroin for 15 years.
