= Thomas Müller (skier) =

West German skier (born 1961)

Medal record

Men's Nordic combined

Representing West Germany

Olympic Games
Gold medal – first place	1988 Calgary	3 x 10 km team

World Championships
Gold medal – first place	1985 Seefeld	3 x 10 km team
Gold medal – first place	1987 Oberstdorf	3 x 10 km team

Thomas Müller (born 5 March 1961, in Aschaffenburg) is a former West German Nordic combined skier who competed during the 1980s and early 1990s. He won the Nordic combined 3 x 10 km team event at the 1988 Winter Olympics in Calgary and also won gold medals in the 3 x 10 km team events at the FIS Nordic World Ski Championships in both 1985 and 1987.

Since the 2004/2005 season he has been the head coach of the Nordic Combined at the Oberstdorf Sports School. In 2009, Thomas Müller was voted Coach of the Year in the Nordic Combined.
