= Hubert Schwarz =

German Nordic combined skier

Medal record

Men's Nordic combined

Olympic Games
Gold medal – first place	1988 Calgary	3 x 10 km team

World Championships
Gold medal – first place	1985 Seefeld	3 x 10 km team

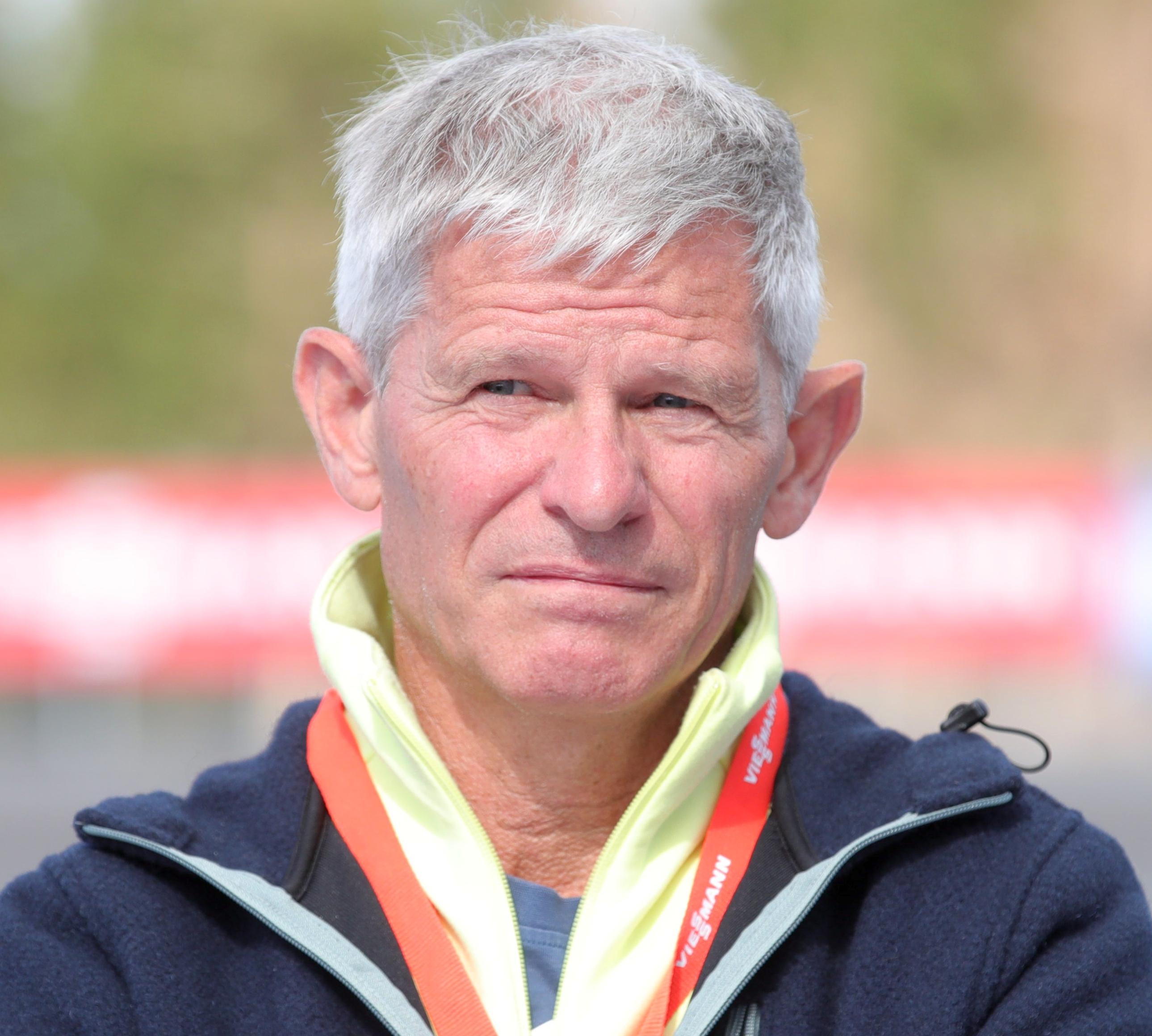
Hubert Schwarz

Hubert Schwarz (born 13 September 1960, in Oberaudorf) is a former German Nordic combined skier who competed during the 1980s. He won the Nordic combined 3 x 10 km team event at the 1988 Winter Olympics in Calgary after having won the gold medal in that same event at the 1985 FIS Nordic World Ski Championships in Seefeld.
