= Trond-Arne Bredesen =

Norwegian Nordic combined skier (born 1967)

Medal record

Men's Nordic combined

Representing Norway

World Championships
Gold medal – first place	1989 Lahti	3 x 10 km team
Silver medal – second place	1987 Oberstdorf	15 km individual
Silver medal – second place	1987 Oberstdorf	3 x 10 km team
Bronze medal – third place	1989 Lahti	15 km individual

Trond-Arne Bredesen (born 4 February 1967 in Gran Municipality) is a former Norwegian Nordic combined competitor from 1986 to 1991, representing Gran IL in Hadeland. He won four medals at the FIS Nordic World Ski Championships with one gold (3 x 10 km team: 1989), two silvers (15 km individual and 3 x 10 km team: both 1987), and one bronze (15 km individual: 1989). Bredesen finished third originally in the 15 km individual event at the 1987 championships, but moved up to second following the doping disqualification of American Kerry Lynch.

He competed at the 1988 Winter Olympics in Calgary, finishing 11th in the 15 km individual event. Bredesen also earned his only individual career victories during the 1988–89 season (four total), giving him the overall World Cup championship that season.
