= Hallstein Bøgseth =

Norwegian Nordic combined skier

Medal record

Men's Nordic combined

Representing Norway

World Championships
Gold medal – first place	1984 Rovaniemi	3 x 10 km team
Silver medal – second place	1982 Oslo	3 x 10 km team
Silver medal – second place	1985 Seefeld	3 x 10 km team
Silver medal – second place	1987 Obersdorf	3 x 10 km team

Hallstein Bøgseth (born 8 July 1954) is a former Norwegian Nordic combined skier. He represented Namdalseid IL in Namdalseid. He won four 3 x 10 km team event medals at the FIS Nordic World Ski Championships with one gold (1984) and three silvers (1982, 1985, and 1987) and finished 8th in the individual event in 1985.

Bøgseth's lone individual victory came at the 1986 Holmenkollen ski festival. He finished 11th in the individual event at the 1984 Winter Olympics in Sarajevo.
