= Ski jumping at the 1988 Winter Olympics – Large hill team =

Men's large hill team at the XV Olympic Winter Games
- Pictogram for ski jumping
- Venue: Canada Olympic Park
- Dates: February 24, 1988
- Competitors: 44 from 11 nations
- Winning score: 634.4

Medalists
| 1st place, gold medalist(s) | | Finland; Ari-Pekka Nikkola, Matti Nykänen, Tuomo Ylipulli, Jari Puikkonen |
| 2nd place, silver medalist(s) | | Yugoslavia; Primož Ulaga, Matjaž Zupan, Matjaž Debelak, Miran Tepeš |
| 3rd place, bronze medalist(s) | | Norway; Ole Christian Eidhammer, Jon Inge Kjørum, Ole Gunnar Fidjestøl, Erik Johnsen |

The men's large hill team ski jumping competition for the 1988 Winter Olympics was held at Canada Olympic Park. It took place on 24 February.

== Results ==
| Rank | Bib | Team | Jump 1 | Jump 2 | Total |
|---|---|---|---|---|---|
| 1st place, gold medalist(s) | 11 | Finland; Ari-Pekka Nikkola; Matti Nykänen; Tuomo Ylipulli; Jari Puikkonen | 320.3; 106.6; 114.6; 99.1; ~~95.0~~ | 314.1; 101.3; 114.2; ~~93.2~~; 98.6 | 634.4; 207.9; 228.8; 192.3; 193.6 |
| 2nd place, silver medalist(s) | 6 | Yugoslavia; Primož Ulaga; Matjaž Zupan; Matjaž Debelak; Miran Tepeš | 308.9; ~~92.7~~; 106.7; 104.1; 98.1 | 316.6; 108.4; 104.8; 103.4; ~~94.7~~ | 625.5; 201.1; 211.5; 207.5; 192.8 |
| 3rd place, bronze medalist(s) | 10 | Norway; Ole Christian Eidhammer; Jon Inge Kjørum; Ole Gunnar Fidjestøl; Erik Johnsen | 295.6; 94.2; ~~39.1~~; 93.2; 108.2 | 300.5; ~~83.0~~; 89.3; 100.7; 110.5 | 596.1; 177.2; 128.4; 193.9; 218.7 |
| 4 | 8 | Czechoslovakia; Ladislav Dluhoš; Jiří Malec; Pavel Ploc; Jiří Parma | 296.1; ~~87.1~~; 103.7; 97.3; 95.1 | 290.7; ~~78.3~~; 89.7; 106.8; 94.2 | 586.8; 165.4; 193.4; 204.1; 189.3 |
| 5 | 9 | Austria; Ernst Vettori; Heinz Kuttin; Günther Stranner; Andreas Felder | 287.2; 94.7; 93.0; 99.5; ~~90.7~~ | 290.4; 91.3; 100.3; 98.8; ~~85.6~~ | 577.6; 186.0; 193.3; 198.3; 176.3 |
| 6 | 7 | West Germany; Andi Bauer; Peter Rohwein; Thomas Klauser; Josef Heumann | 277.8; ~~84.8~~; 90.2; 97.4; 90.2 | 281.2; 90.3; ~~84.1~~; 100.2; 90.7 | 559.0; 175.1; 174.3; 197.6; 180.9 |
| 7 | 5 | Sweden; Per-Inge Tällberg; Anders Daun; Jan Boklöv; Staffan Tällberg | 268.2; 92.2; ~~85.5~~; 88.5; 87.5 | 271.5; ~~69.3~~; 88.7; 91.6; 91.2 | 539.7; 161.5; 174.2; 180.1; 178.7 |
| 8 | 4 | Switzerland; Gérard Balanche; Christoph Lehmann; Fabrice Piazzini; Christian Hauswirth | 258.3; 87.4; ~~73.9~~; 81.6; 89.3 | 257.8; 87.6; ~~82.8~~; 84.5; 85.7 | 516.1; 175.0; 156.7; 166.1; 175.0 |
| 9 | 2 | Canada; Horst Bulau; Steve Collins; Todd Gillman; Ron Richards | 249.8; 87.9; 83.1; ~~67.0~~; 78.8 | 247.4; 91.2; 76.9; ~~71.5~~; 79.3 | 497.2; 179.1; 160.0; 138.5; 158.1 |
| 10 | 10 | United States; Ted Langlois; Mark Konopacke; Dennis McGrane; Mike Holland | 259.3; ~~63.6~~; 78.3; 81.3; 99.7 | 237.5; ~~68.9~~; 73.5; 74.2; 89.8 | 496.8; 132.5; 151.8; 155.5; 189.5 |
| 11 | 1 | Japan; Katsushi Tao; Shinichi Tanaka; Masaru Nagaoka; Akira Sato | 231.5; ~~62.1~~; 67.4; 81.6; 82.5 | 236.5; 72.6; ~~68.5~~; 75.4; 88.5 | 468.0; 134.7; 135.9; 157.0; 171.0 |
