= Ski jumping at the 1988 Winter Olympics – Large hill individual =

Men's large hill individual at the XV Olympic Winter Games
- Pictogram for ski jumping
- Venue: Canada Olympic Park
- Dates: February 23, 1988
- Competitors: 55 from 18 nations
- winning score: 224.0

Medalists
1st place, gold medalist(s)		Matti Nykänen; Finland
2nd place, silver medalist(s)		Erik Johnsen; Norway
3rd place, bronze medalist(s)		Matjaž Debelak; Yugoslavia

The men's large hill individual ski jumping competition for the 1988 Winter Olympics was held in Canada Olympic Park. It occurred on 23 February.

== Results ==
Rank	Bib	Athlete	Country	Jump 1	Jump 2	Total
1st place, gold medalist(s)	49	Matti Nykänen	Finland	120.8	103.2	224.0
2nd place, silver medalist(s)	54	Erik Johnsen	Norway	113.7	94.2	207.9
3rd place, bronze medalist(s)	2	Matjaž Debelak	Yugoslavia	107.6	100.1	207.7
4	38	Thomas Klauser	West Germany	111.7	93.4	205.1
5	44	Pavel Ploc	Czechoslovakia	112.7	91.4	204.1
6	45	Andreas Felder	Austria	110.3	93.6	203.9
7	51	Horst Bulau	Canada	109.4	88.2	197.6
8	48	Staffan Tällberg	Sweden	104.9	91.7	196.6
9	18	Matjaž Zupan	Yugoslavia	110.0	85.8	195.8
10	53	Miran Tepeš	Yugoslavia	98.4	96.4	194.8
11	25	Jari Puikkonen	Finland	99.3	95.3	194.6
12	12	Heinz Kuttin	Austria	108.2	85.3	193.5
13	50	Piotr Fijas	Poland	99.9	92.7	192.6
14	9	Ladislav Dluhoš	Czechoslovakia	99.2	90.3	189.5
15	5	Jon Inge Kjørum	Norway	99.2	90.0	189.2
16	1	Ari-Pekka Nikkola	Finland	97.3	91.7	189.0
17	41	Ole Christian Eidhammer	Norway	104.8	83.1	187.9
18	10	Jan Boklöv	Sweden	99.5	85.9	185.4
19	16	Vegard Opaas	Norway	99.8	85.4	185.2
20	3	Günther Stranner	Austria	106.7	78.2	184.9
21	20	Anders Daun	Sweden	95.2	87.9	183.1
22	27	Remo Lederer	East Germany	98.1	83.7	181.8
22	36	Per-Inge Tällberg	Sweden	97.8	84.0	181.8
24	15	Jiří Malec	Czechoslovakia	101.0	80.2	181.2
25	56	Didier Mollard	France	101.1	76.5	177.6
25	11	Peter Rohwein	West Germany	96.3	81.3	177.6
27	47	Christian Hauswirth	Switzerland	94.9	82.2	177.1
28	26	Ernst Vettori	Austria	94.1	82.5	176.6
29	28	Jiří Parma	Czechoslovakia	89.2	86.1	175.3
30	4	Gérard Balanche	Switzerland	95.4	77.2	172.6
31	43	Jens Weißflog	East Germany	95.7	76.3	172.0
32	46	Mike Holland	United States	96.9	73.7	170.6
33	57	Akira Sato	Japan	88.4	81.8	170.2
34	23	Andi Bauer	West Germany	94.1	75.8	169.9
35	22	Steve Collins	Canada	87.9	81.2	169.1
36	52	Josef Heumann	West Germany	90.7	76.4	167.1
37	13	Jan Kowal	Poland	89.7	74.6	164.3
38	14	Pekka Suorsa	Finland	83.7	79.7	163.4
39	58	Sandro Sambugaro	Italy	85.4	76.2	161.6
40	30	Emil Zografski	Bulgaria	88.0	73.0	161.0
40	34	Primož Ulaga	Yugoslavia	72.2	88.8	161.0
42	40	Mark Konopacke	United States	83.9	76.3	160.2
43	32	Fabrice Piazzini	Switzerland	73.9	83.0	156.9
44	19	Christoph Lehmann	Switzerland	87.3	65.9	153.2
45	33	Virginio Lunardi	Italy	85.4	65.5	150.9
46	55	Vladimir Breychev	Bulgaria	86.5	61.0	147.5
47	21	Shinichi Tanaka	Japan	83.0	64.3	147.3
48	37	Masaru Nagaoka	Japan	82.5	63.5	146.0
49	7	Chris Hastings	United States	74.0	71.1	145.1
50	17	Ted Langlois	United States	75.9	66.9	142.8
51	29	Bernat Sola	Spain	78.5	60.8	139.3
52	8	Katsushi Tao	Japan	78.8	59.4	138.2
53	31	Ron Richards	Canada	73.6	54.5	128.1
54	6	Todd Gillman	Canada	80.8	30.0	110.8
55	24	Eddie Edwards	Great Britain	30.0	27.5	57.5
