= Ski jumping at the 1988 Winter Olympics – Normal hill individual =

Men's normal hill individual at the XV Olympic Winter Games
- Pictogram for ski jumping
- Venue: Canada Olympic Park
- Dates: February 14, 1988
- Competitors: 58 from 19 nations
- winning score: 229.1

Medalists
1st place, gold medalist(s)		Matti Nykänen; Finland
2nd place, silver medalist(s)		Pavel Ploc; Czechoslovakia
3rd place, bronze medalist(s)		Jiří Malec; Czechoslovakia

The men's normal hill individual ski jumping competition for the 1988 Winter Olympics was held in Canada Olympic Park. It occurred on 14 February.

== Results ==
			Round 1			Round 2			
Rank	Athlete	Country	Distance (m)	Points	Rank	Distance (m)	Points	Rank	Points
1st place, gold medalist(s)	Matti Nykänen	Finland	89.5	114.8	1	89.5	114.3	1	229.1
2nd place, silver medalist(s)	Pavel Ploc	Czechoslovakia	84.5	105.3	7	87.0	106.8	2	212.1
3rd place, bronze medalist(s)	Jiří Malec	Czechoslovakia	88.0	106.9	2	85.5	104.9	4	211.8
4	Miran Tepeš	Yugoslavia	84.0	106.0	3	83.5	105.2	3	211.2
5	Jiří Parma	Czechoslovakia	83.5	102.2	13	82.5	101.6	5	203.8
6	Heinz Kuttin	Austria	87.0	105.3	7	80.5	94.4	10	199.7
7	Jari Puikkonen	Finland	84.0	105.5	6	80.0	93.6	12	199.1
8	Staffan Tällberg	Sweden	83.0	99.9	16	81.0	98.2	6	198.1
9	Jens Weißflog	East Germany	81.5	99.5	18	80.0	97.1	8	196.6
10	Piotr Fijas	Poland	84.5	102.3	12	80.0	93.1	13	195.4
11	Akira Sato	Japan	80.0	96.6	22	80.5	97.4	7	194.0
12	Andreas Felder	Austria	80.5	96.9	21	81.0	95.2	9	192.1
13	Steve Collins	Canada	83.5	102.7	10	78.0	88.4	25	191.1
14	Ladislav Dluhoš	Czechoslovakia	85.0	103.6	9	78.0	87.4	32	191.0
15	Ari-Pekka Nikkola	Finland	83.5	100.2	14	79.0	90.5	20	190.7
16	Matjaž Zupan	Yugoslavia	85.0	102.6	11	78.0	87.4	32	190.0
17	Fabrice Piazzini	Switzerland	83.0	99.9	16	78.0	88.9	23	188.8
18	Mark Konopacke	United States	83.5	100.2	14	79.0	88.0	28	188.2
19	Ole Christian Eidhammer	Norway	79.5	92.3	28	80.5	94.4	10	186.7
20	Günther Stranner	Austria	83.5	98.7	19	78.0	87.9	29	186.6
21	Remo Lederer	East Germany	79.5	94.3	25	78.0	90.9	19	185.2
22	Ole Gunnar Fidjestøl	Norway	79.5	91.3	30	80.0	93.1	13	184.4
23	Risto Laakkonen	Finland	81.0	97.2	20	76.5	86.0	37	183.2
24	Ernst Vettori	Austria	79.5	94.8	23	76.0	86.7	36	181.5
25	Masaru Nagaoka	Japan	78.5	89.2	38	80.0	92.1	16	181.3
26	Rajko Lotrič	Yugoslavia	85.0	105.6	5	74.0	74.5	51	180.1
27	Anders Daun	Sweden	79.5	90.8	31	78.0	88.4	25	179.2
28	Jan Boklöv	Sweden	78.0	85.4	42	80.5	92.4	15	177.8
29	Andi Bauer	West Germany	78.5	87.2	40	79.5	90.3	21	177.5
30	Primož Ulaga	Yugoslavia	84.5	105.8	4	72.0	71.3	54	177.1
31	Josef Heumann	West Germany	77.0	84.3	43	80.0	92.1	16	176.4
32	Ron Richards	Canada	78.0	88.4	39	78.0	86.9	34	175.3
33	Mike Holland	United States	79.5	92.8	27	74.5	81.8	42	174.6
34	Jan Kowal	Poland	79.0	89.5	36	77.0	84.8	39	174.3
34	Didier Mollard	France	79.0	90.5	32	77.0	83.8	41	174.3
36	Per-Inge Tällberg	Sweden	79.5	89.3	37	78.0	84.9	38	174.2
37	Gérard Balanche	Switzerland	78.0	85.9	41	78.0	87.9	29	173.8
38	Eduard Suboch	Soviet Union	76.0	83.7	44	78.0	89.9	22	173.6
39	Mikhail Yesin	Soviet Union	80.0	92.1	29	74.0	79.5	46	171.6
40	Emil Zografski	Bulgaria	77.0	83.3	45	78.0	87.9	29	171.2
41	Erik Johnsen	Norway	75.0	80.1	51	79.0	91.0	18	171.1
42	Todd Gillman	Canada	75.0	82.6	46	78.0	88.4	25	171.0
43	Dennis McGrane	United States	78.0	90.4	33	73.0	79.4	47	169.8
44	Horst Bulau	Canada	74.5	80.8	49	78.0	86.9	34	167.7
45	Vegard Opaas	Norway	80.5	92.9	26	72.0	73.3	53	166.2
46	Sandro Sambugaro	Italy	74.0	77.0	55	79.0	88.5	24	165.5
47	Thomas Klauser	West Germany	80.5	94.4	24	71.0	70.7	55	165.1
48	Christian Hauswirth	Switzerland	79.5	90.3	34	73.0	74.4	52	164.7
49	Frédéric Berger	France	75.0	80.6	50	75.5	83.9	40	164.5
50	Virginio Lunardi	Italy	75.5	82.4	47	74.5	79.8	45	162.2
51	Katsushi Tao	Japan	75.0	81.6	48	74.0	80.0	44	161.6
52	Shinichi Tanaka	Japan	74.0	79.0	53	75.0	81.1	43	160.1
53	Vladimir Breychev	Bulgaria	79.0	90.0	35	71.0	69.7	56	159.7
54	Rick Mewborn	United States	75.0	80.1	51	74.0	78.5	48	158.6
55	Dieter Thoma	West Germany	75.0	78.1	54	74.0	76.0	49	154.1
56	Christoph Lehmann	Switzerland	74.0	76.0	56	73.0	74.9	50	150.9
57	Bernat Sola	Spain	71.0	73.2	57	68.5	67.2	57	140.4
58	Eddie Edwards	Great Britain	55.0	34.1	58	55.0	35.1	58	69.2
