= Planica 1987 =

Coordinates: 46°28′35″N 13°43′16″E

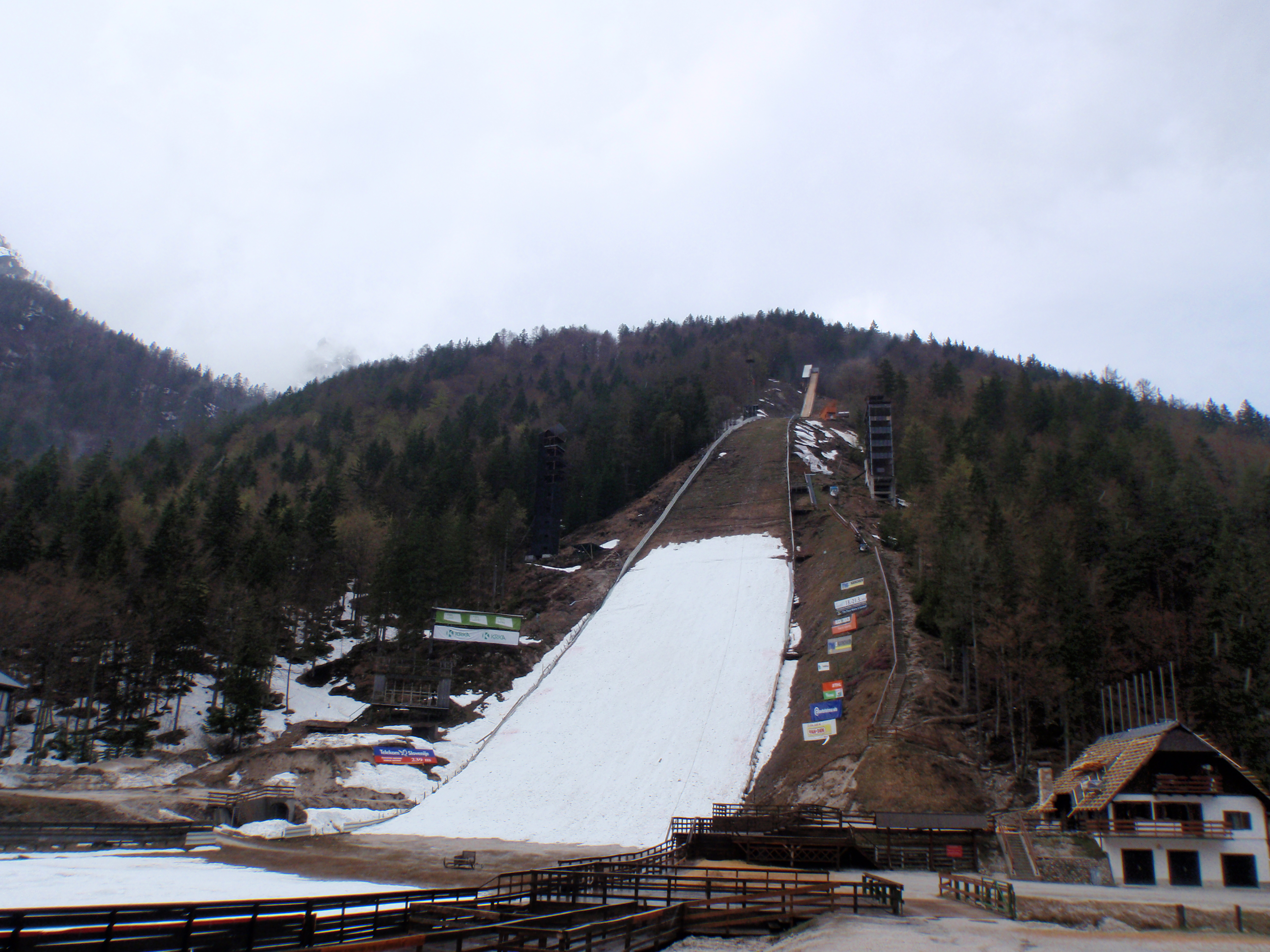
- Host city: Planica, SR Slovenia, Yugoslavia
- Sport: Ski flying
- Events: World Cup (2x)
- Main venue: Velikanka bratov Gorišek K185

Planica 1987 was a two-day ski flying competition part of 1986/87 World Cup season, held from 14 to 15 March 1987 in Planica, SR Slovenia, Yugoslavia. Circa 100,000 people in total has gathered in three days.

== Schedule ==
Date	Event	Rounds	Longest jump of the day	Visitors
13 March 1987	Official training	3	192 metres (630 ft) by Andreas Felder (touch); 189 metres (620 ft) by Piotr Fijas	10,000
14 March 1987	Competition 1	4	194 metres (636 ft) by Piotr Fijas	40,000
15 March 1987	Competition 2	3	193 metres (613 ft) by Vegard Opaas	50,000

== All jumps over 190 metres ==
Chronological order:

- 192 metres (630 ft) – 13 March – Andreas Felder (WR touch, 2RD, Official training)
- 194 metres (636 ft) – 14 March – Piotr Fijas (WR, 3RD, canceled and repeated after)
- 191 metres (627 ft) – 14 March – Andreas Felder (repeated 3RD)
- 190 metres (623 ft) – 15 March – Ole Gunnar Fidjestøl (2RD)
- 193 metres (633 ft) – 15 March – Vegard Opaas (3RD, canceled after)

== 191 rule ==
191 rule, proposed by founder of World Cup Torbjørn Yggeseth, which didn't score flights exceeding 191 metres (627 ft), was first time implemented. Piotr Fijas' 194 metres world record was officially recognized seven years later at the FIS meeting in Rio 1994.

== World Cup ==
There were two individual ski flying events on Velikanka bratov Gorišek K185. By ski flying rules of that time there were three round of jumps, but only two best counted in a final result.

On 11 and 12 March 1987, trial jumpers were already testing the flying hill, while competition was training on the neighbour Bloudkova velikanka K130 hill.

On 13 March 1987, official training was scheduled at 10:00 AM with 18 Yugoslavian ski jumpers at the start. Felder touched the ground at 192 metres WR distance in the second training round in front of 10,000 people. Fijas landed at 189 metres.

=== Official training ===
Incomplete list and order — 10,000 people — 13 March 1987

Bib	Name	Round 1	Round 2	Round 3
3	(Socialist Federal Republic of Yugoslavia) Vili Tepeš	150.0 m	N/A	N/A
N/A	(Socialist Federal Republic of Yugoslavia) Miran Tepeš	159.0 m	166.0 m	172.0 m
N/A	(Socialist Federal Republic of Yugoslavia) Matjaž Zupan	N/A	165.0 m	158.0 m
N/A	(Socialist Federal Republic of Yugoslavia) Janez Debelak	N/A	N/A	154.0 m
N/A	(Socialist Federal Republic of Yugoslavia) Bojan Globočnik	N/A	N/A	N/A
N/A	(Socialist Federal Republic of Yugoslavia) Borut Mur	N/A	N/A	147.0 m
N/A	(Socialist Federal Republic of Yugoslavia) Matjaž Žagar	N/A	161.0 m	N/A
N/A	(Socialist Federal Republic of Yugoslavia) Rajko Lotrič	N/A	164.0 m	147.0 m
N/A	(Socialist Federal Republic of Yugoslavia) Tomaž Dolar	N/A	N/A	N/A
N/A	(Socialist Federal Republic of Yugoslavia) Vasja Bajc	N/A	N/A	154.0 m
N/A	(Socialist Federal Republic of Yugoslavia) Janez Štirn	N/A	N/A	N/A
N/A	(Socialist Federal Republic of Yugoslavia) Iztok Melin	N/A	N/A	N/A
N/A	(Socialist Federal Republic of Yugoslavia) Robert Kopač	N/A	N/A	N/A
N/A	(Socialist Federal Republic of Yugoslavia) Iztok Golob	N/A	N/A	N/A
N/A	(Socialist Federal Republic of Yugoslavia) Dušan Šilar	N/A	N/A	N/A
N/A	(Socialist Federal Republic of Yugoslavia) Primož Ulaga	N/A	155.0 m	N/A
N/A	(Socialist Federal Republic of Yugoslavia) Grega Peljhan	N/A	N/A	N/A
N/A	(Socialist Federal Republic of Yugoslavia) Krištof Gašpirc	N/A	N/A	N/A
N/A	(Austria) Andreas Felder	163.0 m	192.0 m	184.0 m
N/A	(Norway) Ole Gunnar Fidjestøl	N/A	N/A	N/A
N/A	(Norway) Vegard Opaas	N/A	N/A	N/A
N/A	(Norway) Hroar Stjernen	181.0 m	N/A	N/A
N/A	(Norway) Robert Selbekk-Hansen	N/A	N/A	N/A
N/A	(France) Frédéric Berger	N/A	N/A	N/A
N/A	(Sweden) Jan Boklöv	171.0 m	N/A	N/A
N/A	(Poland) Piotr Fijas	170.0 m	N/A	189.0 m
N/A	(Czechoslovakia) Jiří Parma	170.0 m	N/A	N/A
N/A	(West Germany) Rolf Schilli	N/A	N/A	N/A

Invalid WR! Touch.
Crash!

On 14 March 1987, first competition went quiet normal until the last round. It all started complicating in the third round after Piotr Fijas 194 metres world record distance in front of 40,000 people. After this jump jury canceled the third round and repeated it all over from the beginning from a lower gate. Then in the repeated round Andreas Felder, although with lower speed managed to land at 191 metres and won the competition.

On 15 March 1987, first two rounds of second competition went well until Vegard Opaas' jump at 193 metres. Jury canceled the competition right after this jump. Opaas was furious at technical delegate Torbjørn Yggeseth who robbed him of an almost certain victory, which would help him in a very tied World Cup overall battle with Ernst Vettori. Only one best jump of first two rounds counted as official result and Ole Gunnar Fidjestøl won the second competition.

=== First competition ===
WC #185 — Official results — 40,000 people — 14 March 1987

Rank	Name	2 best of 3 rounds		Points
1	(Austria) Andreas Felder	188.0 m	191.0 m	398.0
2	(Norway) Ole Gunnar Fidjestøl	182.0 m	167.0 m	350.5
3	(West Germany) Thomas Klauser	180.0 m	167.0 m	349.5
4	(Socialist Federal Republic of Yugoslavia) Miran Tepeš	171.0 m	163.0 m	344.0
5	(Norway) Hroar Stjernen	173.0 m	166.0 m	343.0
6	(Austria) Günther Stranner	170.0 m	167.0 m	342.5
7	(Poland) Piotr Fijas	175.0 m	166.0 m	341.5
8	(Norway) Vegard Opaas	173.0 m	166.0 m	340.5
9	(Finland) Heikki Ylipulli	167.0 m	169.0 m	335.5
10	(Finland) Tuomo Ylipulli	155.0 m	168.0 m	328.5
	(Socialist Federal Republic of Yugoslavia) Matjaž Zupan	168.0 m	157.0 m	328.5
12	(West Germany) Andreas Bauer	168.0 m	157.0 m	325.0
13	(Czechoslovakia) Jiří Parma	166.0 m	150.0 m	323.0
14	(Sweden) Jan Boklöv	166.0 m	165.0 m	322.5
15	(Finland) Mika Kojonskoski	164.0 m	157.0 m	320.5
16	(Sweden) Magnus Åström	161.0 m	151.0 m	317.5
17	(Sweden) Anders Daun	165.0 m	151.0 m	317.0
18	(Norway) Trond Jøran Pedersen	161.0 m	157.0 m	313.5
	(Finland) Pekka Suorsa	168.0 m	151.0 m	313.5
20	(Austria) Ernst Vettori	168.0 m	151.0 m	313.0
21	(West Germany) Rolf Schilli	160.0 m	153.0 m	309.5
22	(Socialist Federal Republic of Yugoslavia) Janez Debelak	151.0 m	158.0 m	305.5
23	(Czechoslovakia) Pavel Ploc	156.0 m	146.0 m	303.0
	(France) Didier Mollard	148.0 m	158.0 m	303.0
25	(Norway) Jon Inge Kjørum	152.0 m	150.0 m	302.0
	(Switzerland) Fabrice Piazzini	152.0 m	149.0 m	302.0
27	(West Germany) Josef Heumann	157.0 m	150.0 m	301.0
28	(Austria) Franz Wiegele	151.0 m	149.0 m	298.0
29	(Socialist Federal Republic of Yugoslavia) Borut Mur	154.0 m	142.0 m	297.0
30	(Socialist Federal Republic of Yugoslavia) Matjaž Žagar	150.0 m	145.0 m	296.0
31	(United States) Mike Holland	N/A	N/A	294.0
32	(Czechoslovakia) Jiří Malec	N/A	N/A	293.0
33	(Italy) Antonio Lacedelli	N/A	N/A	291.5
34	(France) Gérard Colin	N/A	N/A	290.0
35	(East Germany) Raimund Litschko	N/A	N/A	289.5
36	(Austria) Franz Neuländtner	N/A	N/A	281.5
37	(East Germany) M. Arnold	N/A	N/A	280.5
38	(Socialist Federal Republic of Yugoslavia) Rajko Lotrič	139.0 m	141.0 m	280.0
39	(Czechoslovakia) Ladislav Dluhoš	N/A	N/A	278.5
40	(Czechoslovakia) Martin Švagerko	N/A	N/A	275.0
41	(Socialist Federal Republic of Yugoslavia) Tomaž Dolar	141.0 m	136.0 m	274.0
42	(Austria) Wolfgang Margreiter	N/A	N/A	270.5
43	(Switzerland) Gérard Balanche	N/A	N/A	270.0
44	(Socialist Federal Republic of Yugoslavia) Vasja Bajc	139.0 m	138.0 m	265.5
45	(United States) Mark Konopacke	N/A	N/A	261.5
46	(Socialist Federal Republic of Yugoslavia) Janez Štirn	150.0 m	117.0 m	260.5
47	(Italy) Ivan Lunardi	N/A	N/A	259.0
48	(Italy) Sandro Sambugaro	N/A	N/A	257.0
49	(Austria) Paul Erat	N/A	N/A	255.5
50	(Austria) Harald Rodlauer	N/A	N/A	255.0
	(East Germany) Udo Okraffka	N/A	N/A	255.0
52	(West Germany) Heini Ihle	N/A	N/A	249.5
53	(United States) Newborn	N/A	N/A	243.0
54	(United States) Smith	N/A	N/A	241.0
55	(Socialist Federal Republic of Yugoslavia) Iztok Melin	124.0 m	125.0 m	237.5
56	(Hungary) László Fischer	N/A	N/A	237.0
57	(Socialist Federal Republic of Yugoslavia) Robert Kopač	129.0 m	122.0 m	235.0
58	(Switzerland) Bruno Romang	N/A	N/A	233.5
59	(France) Breche	N/A	N/A	225.0
60	(Socialist Federal Republic of Yugoslavia) Iztok Golob	123.0 m	112.0 m	217.5
61	(Socialist Federal Republic of Yugoslavia) Vili Tepeš	109.0 m	116.0 m	207.0
62	(Socialist Federal Republic of Yugoslavia) Primož Ulaga	N/A	83.0 m	53.0

After Fijas' 194 m jump, 3rd round was canceled and repeated all over again.

=== Second competition ===
WC #186 — Official results — 50,000 people — 15 March 1987

Rank	Name	1 best of 2	Points
1	(Norway) Ole Gunnar Fidjestøl	190.0 m	186.0
2	(Socialist Federal Republic of Yugoslavia) Matjaž Zupan	184.0 m	182.0
3	(Poland) Piotr Fijas	185.0 m	180.5
4	(Socialist Federal Republic of Yugoslavia) Miran Tepeš	166.0 m	180.0
5	(Norway) Vegard Opaas	168.0 m	178.0
6	(West Germany) Andreas Bauer	180.0 m	172.5
7	(Finland) Heikki Ylipulli	165.0 m	174.0
8	(Austria) Günther Stranner	164.0 m	173.5
9	(Norway) Hroar Stjernen	162.0 m	170.5
10	(East Germany) Raimund Litschko	161.0 m	169.5
11	(West Germany) Thomas Klauser	174.0 m	169.0
12	(Finland) Pekka Suorsa	175.0 m	167.5
	(Norway) Trond Jøran Pedersen	174.0 m	167.5
14	(Austria) Andreas Felder	159.0 m	165.5
15	(Switzerland) Fabrice Piazzini	157.0 m	164.0
16	(Finland) Tuomo Ylipulli	156.0 m	162.0
17	(France) Didier Mollard	153.0 m	159.5
18	(Austria) Wolfgang Margreiter	164.0 m	157.0
19	(Socialist Federal Republic of Yugoslavia) Matjaž Žagar	150.0 m	156.5
20	(Czechoslovakia) Jiří Malec	150.0 m	155.0
	(Norway) Jon Inge Kjørum	151.0 m	155.0
22	(Socialist Federal Republic of Yugoslavia) Tomaž Dolar	160.0 m	154.5
	(Czechoslovakia) Jiří Parma	149.0 m	154.5
24	(West Germany) Josef Heumann	149.0 m	152.5
25	(Italy) Antonio Lacedelli	148.0 m	152.0
	(Sweden) Anders Daun	149.0 m	152.0
27	(Czechoslovakia) Pavel Ploc	146.0 m	151.5
28	(Socialist Federal Republic of Yugoslavia) Vasja Bajc	158.0 m	149.5
29	(Italy) Sandro Sambugaro	145.0 m	149.0
	(United States) Mark Konopacke	157.0 m	149.0
31	(West Germany) Rolf Schilli	N/A	147.5
32	(East Germany) M. Arnold	N/A	147.0
33	(Socialist Federal Republic of Yugoslavia) Borut Mur	141.0 m	146.0
34	(Czechoslovakia) Martin Švagerko	N/A	145.0
	(United States) Mike Holland	N/A	145.0
36	(Socialist Federal Republic of Yugoslavia) Rajko Lotrič	140.0 m	144.0
	(Socialist Federal Republic of Yugoslavia) Janez Debelak	153.0 m	144.0
	(Finland) Mika Kojonkoski	N/A	144.0
39	(Czechoslovakia) Ladislav Dluhoš	N/A	143.0
40	(Austria) Franz Wiegele	N/A	142.5
41	(Austria) Paul Erat	N/A	141.0
42	(Socialist Federal Republic of Yugoslavia) Janez Štirn	150.0 m	140.0
43	(Italy) Ivan Lunardi	N/A	139.5
44	(East Germany) Udo Okraffka	N/A	138.5
45	(West Germany) Heini Ihle	N/A	134.0
46	(Sweden) Magnus Åström	N/A	133.5
47	(Socialist Federal Republic of Yugoslavia) Robert Kopač	131.0 m	132.0
48	(France) Breche	N/A	127.5
	(Switzerland) Bruno Romang	N/A	127.5
	(Austria) Harald Rodlauer	N/A	127.5
	(Switzerland) Gérard Balanche	N/A	127.5
52	(Hungary) László Fischer	N/A	125.0
53	(United States) Smith	N/A	121.0
54	(Switzerland) Fabrice Piazzini	N/A	118.0
55	(Socialist Federal Republic of Yugoslavia) Iztok Melin	116.0 m	112.5
56	(Socialist Federal Republic of Yugoslavia) Iztok Golob	115.0 m	110.0
	(United States) Newborn	N/A	110.0
58	(Socialist Federal Republic of Yugoslavia) Vili Tepeš	116.0 m	108.5

After Opaas' 193 m, 3rd round canceled, 1 best of two rounds valid.

== Ski flying world records ==
The all-time longest standing ski jump in parallel style ever.

Date	Name	Country	Metres	Feet
13 March 1987	Andreas Felder	Austria	192	630
14 March 1987	Piotr Fijas	Poland	194	636

Not recognized! Touched the ground at world record distance.
