= Japan at the 1988 Winter Olympics =

- IOC code: JPN
- NOC: Japanese Olympic Committee
- Website: www.joc.or.jp (in Japanese and English)

in Calgary
- Competitors: 48 in 9 sports
- Flag bearer: Seiko Hashimoto (speed skating)
- Medals Ranked 16th: Gold 0 Silver 0 Bronze 1 Total 1

Winter Olympics appearances (overview)
- 1928; 1932; 1936; 1948; 1952; 1956; 1960; 1964; 1968; 1972; 1976; 1980; 1984; 1988; 1992; 1994; 1998; 2002; 2006; 2010; 2014; 2018; 2022; 2026

Japan competed at the 1988 Winter Olympics in Calgary, Alberta, Canada.

== Competitors ==
The following is the list of number of competitors in the Games.

| Sport | Men | Women | Total |
|---|---|---|---|
| Alpine skiing | 4 | 2 | 6 |
| Biathlon | 4 | – | 4 |
| Bobsleigh | 4 | – | 4 |
| Cross-country skiing | 4 | 0 | 4 |
| Figure skating | 2 | 3 | 5 |
| Luge | 3 | 2 | 5 |
| Nordic combined | 3 | – | 3 |
| Ski jumping | 4 | – | 4 |
| Speed skating | 9 | 4 | 13 |
| Total | 37 | 11 | 48 |

== Medalists ==
| Medal | Name | Sport | Event | Date |
|---|---|---|---|---|
| Bronze | Akira Kuroiwa | Speed skating | Men's 500 metres | 14 February |

== Alpine skiing ==
Men

| Athlete | Event | Race 1 | Race 2 | Total | |
| Athlete | Event | Time | Time | Time | Rank |
|---|---|---|---|---|---|
| Katsuhito Kumagai | Downhill | | | 2:07.17 | 34 |
| Shinya Chiba | Downhill | | | 2:03.16 | 11 |
| Katsuhito Kumagai | Super-G | | | DNF | – |
| Shinya Chiba | Super-G | | | 1:43.03 | 14 |
| Katsuhito Kumagai | Giant Slalom | DNF | – | DNF | – |
| Chiaki Ishioka | Giant Slalom | 1:09.11 | 1:06.29 | 2:15.40 | 31 |
| Tetsuya Okabe | Giant Slalom | 1:08.30 | 1:06.18 | 2:14.49 | 28 |
| Chiaki Ishioka | Slalom | DNF | – | DNF | – |
| Tetsuya Okabe | Slalom | 53.11 | 48.82 | 1:41.93 | 12 |

Men's combined

| Athlete | Downhill | Slalom | | Total | |
| Athlete | Time | Time 1 | Time 2 | Points | Rank |
|---|---|---|---|---|---|
| Katsuhito Kumagai | 1:52.10 | 48.85 | 47.17 | 144.65 | 21 |

Women

| Athlete | Event | Race 1 | Race 2 | Total | |
| Athlete | Event | Time | Time | Time | Rank |
|---|---|---|---|---|---|
| Sachiko Yamamoto | Downhill | | | 1:30.15 | 23 |
| Emi Kawabata | Downhill | | | 1:27.85 | 14 |
| Sachiko Yamamoto | Super-G | | | 1:24.32 | 30 |
| Emi Kawabata | Super-G | | | 1:22.24 | 24 |
| Sachiko Yamamoto | Giant Slalom | DNF | – | DNF | – |
| Emi Kawabata | Giant Slalom | 1:02.10 | DNF | DNF | – |
| Sachiko Yamamoto | Slalom | DNF | – | DNF | – |
| Emi Kawabata | Slalom | 54.70 | 54.65 | 1:49.35 | 19 |

Women's combined

| Athlete | Downhill | Slalom | | Total | |
| Athlete | Time | Time 1 | Time 2 | Points | Rank |
|---|---|---|---|---|---|
| Sachiko Yamamoto | 1:20.33 | 43.66 | 46.60 | 139.01 | 20 |
| Emi Kawabata | 1:18.53 | DNF | – | DNF | – |

== Biathlon ==
Men

| Event | Athlete | Misses ^{1} | Time | Rank |
|---|---|---|---|---|
| 10 km Sprint | Akihiro Takizawa | 5 | 31:38.7 | 63 |
| 10 km Sprint | Koichi Sato | 3 | 29:43.1 | 59 |
| 10 km Sprint | Tadashi Nakamura | 2 | 28:11.4 | 44 |
| 10 km Sprint | Misao Kodate | 2 | 27:52.6 | 39 |

| Event | Athlete | Time | Misses | Adjusted time ^{2} | Rank |
|---|---|---|---|---|---|
| 20 km | Akihiro Takizawa | 1'03:38.0 | 7 | 1'10:38.0 | 61 |
| 20 km | Koichi Sato | 1'02:18.7 | 8 | 1'10:18.7 | 60 |
| 20 km | Tadashi Nakamura | 57:01.3 | 8 | 1'05:01.3 | 48 |
| 20 km | Misao Kodate | 57:51.0 | 6 | 1'03:51.0 | 40 |

Men's 4 x 7.5 km relay

| Athletes | Race | | |
| Athletes | Misses ^{1} | Time | Rank |
|---|---|---|---|
| Tadashi Nakamura; Misao Kodate; Akihiro Takizawa; Koichi Sato | 6 | 1'32:52.4 | 14 |

^{1} A penalty loop of 150 metres had to be skied per missed target.
^{2} One minute added per missed target.

== Bobsleigh ==
| Sled | Athletes | Event | Run 1 | | Run 2 | | Run 3 | | Run 4 | | Total | |
| Sled | Athletes | Event | Time | Rank | Time | Rank | Time | Rank | Time | Rank | Time | Rank |
|---|---|---|---|---|---|---|---|---|---|---|---|---|
| JPN-1 | Takao Sakai; Naomi Takewaki | Two-man | 58.32 | 15 | 1:00.39 | 21 | DNF | – | – | – | DNF | – |
| JPN-2 | Yuji Yaku; Toshio Wakita | Two-man | 58.57 | 19 | 1:00.58 | 23 | 1:01.51 | 25 | 1:00.38 | 22 | 4:01.04 | 20 |

| Sled | Athletes | Event | Run 1 | | Run 2 | | Run 3 | | Run 4 | | Total | |
| Sled | Athletes | Event | Time | Rank | Time | Rank | Time | Rank | Time | Rank | Time | Rank |
|---|---|---|---|---|---|---|---|---|---|---|---|---|
| JPN-1 | Takao Sakai; Toshio Wakita; Yuji Yaku; Naomi Takewaki | Four-man | 57.36 | 17 | 58.15 | 16 | 57.68 | 22 | 58.16 | 16 | 3:51.35 | 18 |

== Cross-country skiing ==
Men

| Event | Athlete | Race | |
| Event | Athlete | Time | Rank |
|---|---|---|---|
| 15 km C | Masaharu Yamazaki | 50:06.8 | 68 |
| 15 km C | Tanayuki Yuki | 47:08.4 | 52 |
| 15 km C | Kazunari Sasaki | 46:12.6 | 45 |
| 30 km C | Masaharu Yamazaki | 1'43:58.3 | 77 |
| 30 km C | Tanayuki Yuki | 1'37:11.9 | 57 |
| 30 km C | Atsushi Egawa | 1'32:35.4 | 37 |
| 30 km C | Kazunari Sasaki | 1'29:59.2 | 20 |
| 50 km F | Atsushi Egawa | 2'17:52.8 | 42 |
| 50 km F | Tanayuki Yuki | 2'16:24.7 | 39 |
| 50 km F | Kazunari Sasaki | 2'13:09.6 | 32 |

C = Classical style, F = Freestyle

Men's 4 × 10 km relay

| Athletes | Race | |
| Athletes | Time | Rank |
|---|---|---|
| Atsushi Egawa; Kazunari Sasaki; Tanayuki Yuki; Masaharu Yamazaki | 1'51:10.7 | 14 |

== Figure skating ==
Men

| Athlete | CF | SP | FS | TFP | Rank |
|---|---|---|---|---|---|
| Makoto Kano | 19 | 19 | 19 | 38.0 | 17 |

Women

| Athlete | CF | SP | FS | TFP | Rank |
|---|---|---|---|---|---|
| Junko Yaginuma | 16 | 15 | 14 | 29.6 | 14 |
| Midori Ito | 10 | 4 | 3 | 10.6 | 5 |

Ice Dancing

| Athletes | CD | OD | FD | TFP | Rank |
|---|---|---|---|---|---|
| Tomoko Tanaka; Hiroyuki Suzuki | 18 | 18 | 18 | 36.0 | 18 |

== Luge ==
Men

| Athlete | Run 1 | | Run 2 | | Run 3 | | Run 4 | | Total | |
| Athlete | Time | Rank | Time | Rank | Time | Rank | Time | Rank | Time | Rank |
|---|---|---|---|---|---|---|---|---|---|---|
| Toru Ito | 47.753 | 27 | 47.880 | 27 | 46.601 | 28 | 48.439 | 29 | 3:12.673 | 26 |
| Kazuhiko Takamatsu | 47.278 | 19 | 47.235 | 19 | 47.326 | 18 | 47.176 | 13 | 3:09.015 | 18 |

(Men's) Doubles

| Athletes | Run 1 | | Run 2 | | Total | |
| Athletes | Time | Rank | Time | Rank | Time | Rank |
|---|---|---|---|---|---|---|
| Kazuhiko Takamatsu; Tsukasa Hirakawa | 47.129 | 16 | 47.324 | 14 | 1:34.453 | 14 |

Women

| Athlete | Run 1 | | Run 2 | | Run 3 | | Run 4 | | Total | |
| Athlete | Time | Rank | Time | Rank | Time | Rank | Time | Rank | Time | Rank |
|---|---|---|---|---|---|---|---|---|---|---|
| Mina Tanaka | 47.770 | 20 | 47.945 | 18 | 47.928 | 19 | 47.599 | 18 | 3:11.242 | 18 |
| Hitomi Koshimizu | 47.682 | 19 | 49.276 | 24 | 49.160 | 23 | 48.008 | 21 | 3:14.126 | 21 |

== Nordic combined ==
Men's individual

Events:

- normal hill ski jumping (Best two out of three jumps.)
- 15 km cross-country skiing (Start delay, based on ski jumping results.)

| Athlete | Event | Ski Jumping | | Cross-country | | Total | |
| Athlete | Event | Points | Rank | Start at | Time | Points | Rank |
|---|---|---|---|---|---|---|---|
| Hideki Miyazaki | Individual | 175.8 | 41 | 5:51.4 | 45:40.8 | 376.240 | 37 |
| Masashi Abe | Individual | 182.5 | 36 | 5:06.7 | 44:31.1 | 386.690 | 31 |
| Kazuoki Kodama | Individual | 187.7 | 32 | 4:32.0 | 45:40.2 | 376.320 | 36 |

Men's Team

Three participants per team.

Events:

- normal hill ski jumping (Three jumps per team member per round, best two rounds counted.)
- 10 km cross-country skiing (Start delay, based on ski jumping results.)

| Athletes | Ski jumping | | Cross-country | | Total |
| Athletes | Points | Rank | Start at | Time | Rank |
|---|---|---|---|---|---|
| Hideki Miyazaki; Masashi Abe; Kazuoki Kodama | 515.3 | 10 | 9:32.5 | 1'29:26.3 | 9 |

== Ski jumping ==
| Athlete | Event | Jump 1 | | Jump 2 | | Total | |
| Athlete | Event | Distance | Points | Distance | Points | Points | Rank |
|---|---|---|---|---|---|---|---|
| Shinichi Tanaka | Normal hill | 74.0 | 79.0 | 75.0 | 81.1 | 160.1 | 52 |
| Katsushi Tao | Normal hill | 75.0 | 81.6 | 80.5 | 97.4 | 161.6 | 51 |
| Masaru Nagaoka | Normal hill | 78.5 | 89.2 | 80.0 | 92.1 | 181.3 | 25 |
| Akira Sato | Normal hill | 80.0 | 96.6 | 80.0 | 97.1 | 194.0 | 11 |
| Katsushi Tao | Large hill | 96.0 | 78.8 | 85.0 | 59.4 | 138.2 | 52 |
| Masaru Nagaoka | Large hill | 99.0 | 82.5 | 89.0 | 63.5 | 146.0 | 48 |
| Shinichi Tanaka | Large hill | 99.0 | 83.0 | 88.5 | 64.3 | 147.3 | 47 |
| Akira Sato | Large hill | 100.0 | 88.4 | 96.0 | 81.8 | 170.2 | 33 |

Men's team large hill

| Athletes | Result | |
| Athletes | Points ^{1} | Rank |
|---|---|---|
| Katsushi Tao; Shinichi Tanaka; Masaru Nagaoka; Akira Sato | 468.0 | 11 |

^{1} Four teams members performed two jumps each. The best three were counted.

== Speed skating ==
Men

| Event | Athlete | Race | |
| Event | Athlete | Time | Rank |
|---|---|---|---|
| 500 m | Kimihiro Hamaya | 37.38 | 13 |
| 500 m | Yasushi Kuroiwa | 37.34 | 11 |
| 500 m | Yasumitsu Kanehama | 37.25 | 9 |
| 500 m | Akira Kuroiwa | 36.77 | 3rd place, bronze medalist(s) |
| 1000 m | Yukihiro Mitani | 1:15.28 | 23 |
| 1000 m | Akira Kuroiwa | 1:15.05 | 20 |
| 1000 m | Kimihiro Hamaya | 1:14.43 | 13 |
| 1000 m | Yasumitsu Kanehama | 1:14.36 | 9 |
| 1500 m | Hozumi Noriyama | 1:56.84 | 28 |
| 1500 m | Yoshiyuki Shimizu | 1:55.98 | 22 |
| 1500 m | Munehisa Kuroiwa | 1:55.42 | 16 |
| 1500 m | Toru Aoyanagi | 1:52.85 | 5 |
| 5000 m | Yoshiyuki Shimizu | 7:05.35 | 32 |
| 5000 m | Munehisa Kuroiwa | 7:01.55 | 27 |
| 5000 m | Toru Aoyanagi | 6:54.70 | 14 |
| 10,000 m | Yoshiyuki Shimizu | 14:47.21 | 28 |
| 10,000 m | Toru Aoyanagi | 14:34.87 | 24 |

Women

| Event | Athlete | Race | |
| Event | Athlete | Time | Rank |
|---|---|---|---|
| 500 m | Noriko Toda | 41.44 | 21 |
| 500 m | Shoko Fusano | 40.61 | 8 |
| 500 m | Seiko Hashimoto | 39.74 | 5 |
| 1000 m | Noriko Toda | 1:23.49 | 22 |
| 1000 m | Shoko Fusano | 1:21.47 | 11 |
| 1000 m | Seiko Hashimoto | 1:19.75 | 5 |
| 1500 m | Natsue Seki | 2:08.89 | 19 |
| 1500 m | Seiko Hashimoto | 2:04.38 | 6 |
| 3000 m | Natsue Seki | 4:29.77 | 18 |
| 3000 m | Seiko Hashimoto | 4:23.29 | 7 |
| 5000 m | Natsue Seki | 7:47.43 | 19 |
| 5000 m | Seiko Hashimoto | 7:34.43 | 6 |
