= List of Olympic venues in ski jumping =

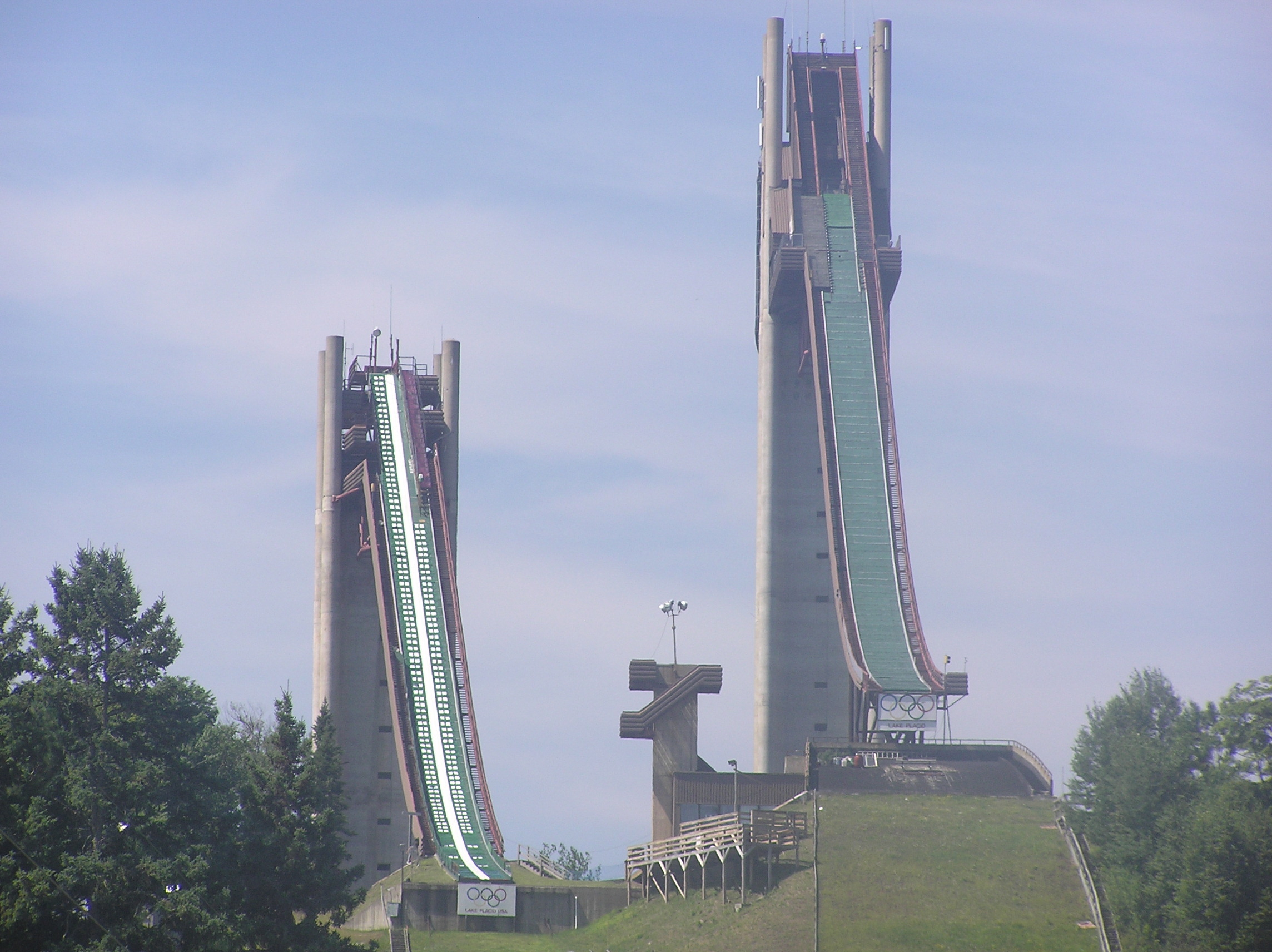
Intervales Ski-Jump Hill at Lake Placid in 2006. They hosted the 1932 and 1980 Winter Olympic ski jumping events.

For the Winter Olympics, there are 26 venues that have been or will be used for ski jumping. From 1924 to 1956, the construction point or K-point of the ski jumping hill was not fixed by the International Ski Federation. For 1924, it was 71 m (233 ft); 1928: 66 m (217 ft); 1932: 61 m (200 ft); 1936: 80 m (260 ft); 1948: 68 m (223 ft); 1952: 72 m (236 ft); and 1956: 72 m (236 ft)

The first ski jump distance that was standardized was at the 1960 games though it was not measured at the K-point, but at the P-point, which is the beginning of the landing zone area of the ski jump. At the 1960 Games, this P-point was 80 m (260 ft). A second ski jumping hill for a ski jumping event was added in 1964 with a normal hill that had a P-point of 70 m (230 ft) in Seefeld while the large hill of 80 m (260 ft) was located at Bergsielschanze in Innsbruck. The large hill ski jump P-point was lengthened to 90 m (300 ft) for the 1968 Games at Saint-Nizier-du-Moucherotte while the ski jump P-point at Autrans remained at 70 m (230 ft). The ski jumping hills remained in separate locations for both the 1972 and the 1976 Games though the Bergielschanze hill that was used in 1976 had its P-point lengthened from 80 m (260 ft) to 90 m (300 ft). The two hills used for ski jumping would not be combined into one single venue until the 1980 Games, although the venues of the 1936 and 1960 Games combined the large hill for the ski jumping event with the normal hill for the Nordic combined event. By the 1992 Games, the hills were being referred to by the K-point rather than their P-Point which meant the normal hill P-Point of 70 m (230 ft) had a K-point of 90 m (300 ft) while the large hill P-point of 90 m (300 ft) had a K-point of 120 m (390 ft) This standard remained until the 2002 Games when the hills were then by their size (HS) or landing point (L) which is 10 m (33 ft) further than the K-point of a normal hill and 15 m (49 ft) further than the K-point of a large hill. The first Winter Olympics to use the HS designation was at the 2006 Games in Turin.

Two of the hills used in the Olympics, Große Olympiaschanze in Garmisch-Partenkirchen for 1936, and Bergiselschanze for the 1964 and 1976 large hill events, have served as hosts for the Four Hills Tournament since the tournament's inception in 1953. Forty-four years later, the Nordic Tournament was created and it involves the 1952 venue at Holmenkollbakken in Oslo's Holmenkollen National Arena and has at times involved the 1994 venue at Lysgårdsbakken in Lillehammer, both in Norway.

== List ==
List of Olympic venues in ski jumping
Image	Olympiad	Venue	Location	Country	Normal size (m)	Large size (m)	New	Capacity	Events (SJ)	Events (NC)	Ref
	1924 Chamonix	Le Tremplin Olympique du Mont	Chamonix	France	—	P 60	No	—	Individual	Individual	
	1928 St. Moritz	Olympiaschanze St. Moritz	St. Moritz	Switzerland	—	P 66	Yes	—	Individual	Individual	
	1932 Lake Placid	Intervales Ski-Hill	Lake Placid	United States	—	P 61	No	9,200	Individual	Individual	
	1936 Garmisch-Partenkirchen	Große Olympiaschanze	Garmisch-Partenkirchen	(Nazi Germany) Germany	P 50	P 80	No	40,000	LH	NH	
	1948 St. Moritz	Olympiaschanze St. Moritz	St. Moritz	Switzerland	—	P 68	No	—	Individual	Individual	
	1952 Oslo	Holmenkollbakken	Oslo	Norway	—	P 63.5	No	150,000	Individual	Individual	
	1956 Cortina d'Ampezzo	Trampolino Olimpico Italia	Cortina d'Ampezzo	Italy	—	P 72	Yes	46,152	Individual	Individual	
	1960 Squaw Valley	Papoose Peak Jumps	Squaw Valley	United States	P 60	P 80	Yes	—	LH	NH	
	1964 Innsbruck	Toni-Seelos-Olympiaschanze	Seefeld	Austria	P 72.8	—	No	—	NH	NH	
	1964 Innsbruck	Bergiselschanze	Innsbruck	Austria	—	P 81	No	—	LH	—	
	1968 Grenoble	Tremplin du Claret	Autrans	France	P 70; TP 77; K 84	—	Yes	40,000	NH	NH	
	1968 Grenoble	Dauphine	Saint-Nizier-du-Moucherotte	France	—	P 90; TP 99; K 108	Yes	50,000	LH	—	
	1972 Sapporo	Miyanomori Ski Jump Stadium	Sapporo	Japan	P 70; TP 78; K 86	—	Yes	—	NH	NH	
	1972 Sapporo	Mount Okura Ski Jump Stadium	Sapporo	Japan	—	P 90; TP 100; K 110	No	—	LH	—	
	1976 Innsbruck	Toni-Seelos-Olympiaschanze	Seefeld	Austria	P 70; TP 77; K 84	—	No	15,000	NH	NH	
	1976 Innsbruck	Bergiselschanze	Innsbruck	Austria	—	P 86; TP 95; K 104	No	—	LH	—	
	1980 Lake Placid	Intervales Ski-Hill	Lake Placid	United States	P 70; TP 78; K 86	P 90; TP 102; K 114	No	18,000	NH, LH	NH	
	1984 Sarajevo	Igman Olympic Jumps	Sarajevo	(Socialist Federal Republic of Yugoslavia) Yugoslavia	P 70; K 90	P 90; K 112	Yes	—	NH, LH	NH	
	1988 Calgary	Alberta Ski Jump Area	Calgary	Canada	P 70; TP 79.5; K 89	P 90; TP 102; K 114	Yes	35,000	NH, LH, T	NH, T	
	1992 Albertville	Tremplin du Praz	Courchevel	France	K 90	K 120	Yes	23,000	NH, LH, T	NH, T	
	1994 Lillehammer	Lysgårdsbakken	Lillehammer	Norway	K 90	K 123	Yes	35,000	NH, LH, T	NH, T	
	1998 Nagano	Hakuba Ski Jumping Stadium	Hakuba	Japan	K 90	K 120	Yes	45,000	NH, LH, T	NH, T	
	2002 Salt Lake City	Utah Olympic Park Jumps	Park City	United States	K 90; JD 101	K 120; JD 128	Yes	18,100	NH, LH, T	NH, LH, T	
	2006 Turin	Stadio del Trampolino	Pragelato	Italy	HS 106; K 95	HS 140; K 125	Yes	8,055	NH, LH, T	NH, LH, T	
	2010 Vancouver	Whistler Olympic Park Ski Jumps	Whistler	Canada	HS 106; K 95	HS 140; K 125	Yes	6,000	NH, LH, T	NH, LH, T	
	2014 Sochi	RusSki Gorki Jumping Center	Esto-Sadok	Russia	HS 105; K 95	HS 140; K 125	Yes	9,600	NH, LH, T, W	NH, LH, T	
	2018 Pyeongchang	Alpensia Ski Jumping Stadium	Pyeongchang	South Korea	HS 109; K 98	HS 142; K 125	No	8,500	NH, LH, T, W	NH, LH, T	
	2022 Winter Olympics	Snow Ruyi National Ski Jumping Centre	Zhangjiakou	China	HS 106; K 95	HS 140; K 125	Yes	6,000	NH, LH, T, W, MT	NH, LH, T	
	2026 Winter Olympics	"Giuseppe Dal Ben" Ski Jumping Arena	Predazzo	Italy	HS 109; K 98	HS 143; K 128	No	Not listed.	MNH, MLH, T, WNH, WLH, MT	NH, LH, T	
