= Eddie the Eagle =

British ski jumper (born 1963)

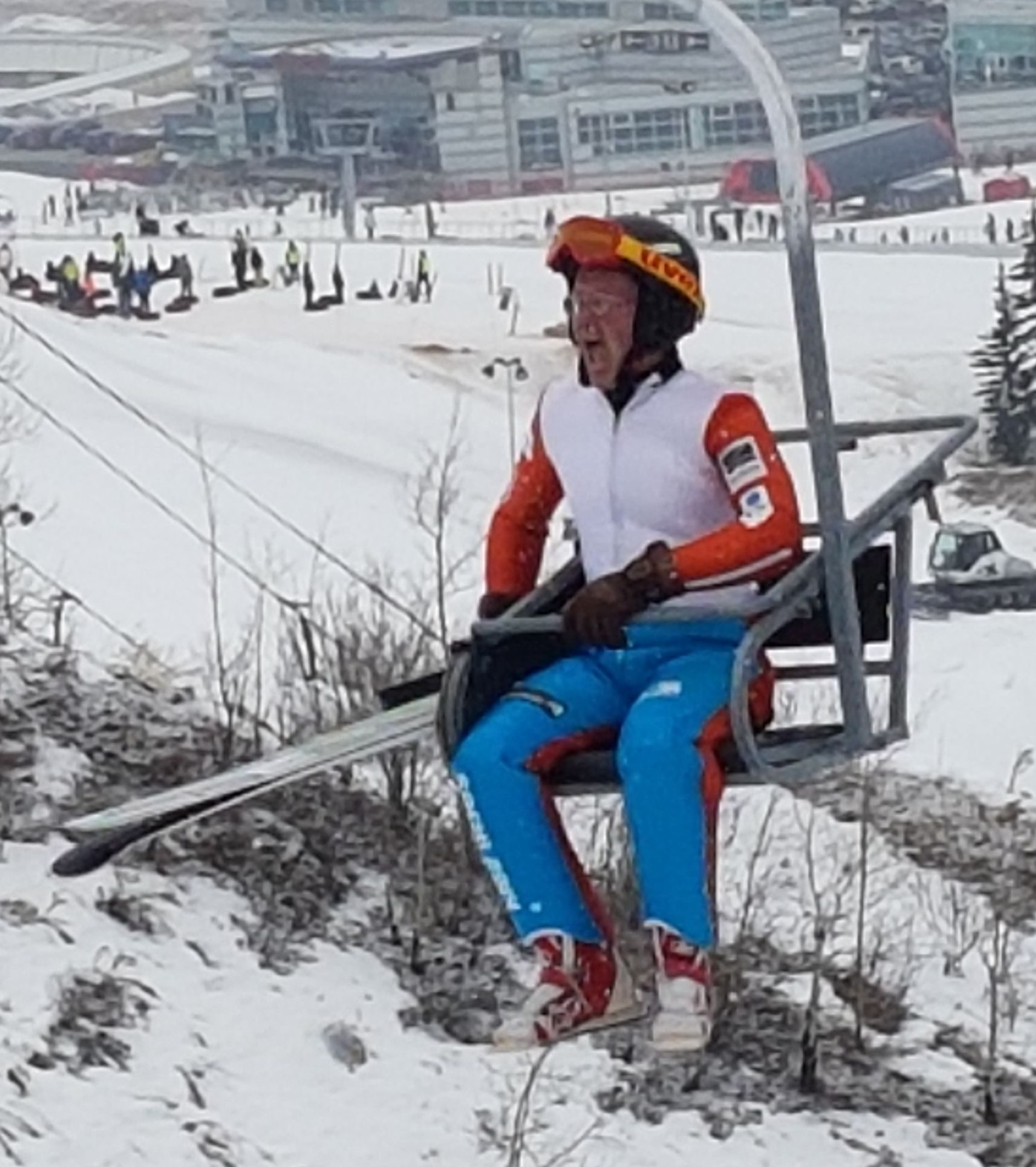
- Edwards riding a ski lift in Calgary, Alberta, Canada, in 2017

Personal information
- Full name: Michael David Edwards
- Nationality: Great Britain
- Born: 5 December 1963 (age 62) Cheltenham, Gloucestershire, England
- Height: 1.73 m (5 ft 8 in)

Sport
- Sport: Skiing

World Cup career
- Seasons: 1987–1989

Michael David Edwards (born 5 December 1963), better known as Eddie the Eagle or Eddie Edwards, is an English ski jumper and Olympian who in 1988 became the first competitor to represent Great Britain in Olympic ski jumping. Despite finishing last in the normal hill and large hill events, he held the British ski jumping record from 1988 to 2001. He also took part in amateur speed skiing, running at 106.8 mph (171.9 km/h), and became a stunt jumping world record holder for jumping over 6 buses.

== Early life ==
Edwards was born in Cheltenham, Gloucestershire. His family calls him by his given name, Michael. "Eddie" is a nickname derived by schoolfriends from his surname. After a taste of skiing on a school trip aged 13, he developed his skills on dry slopes, then worked for a season at Glenshee in Scotland. Having not made the grade as a downhill skier, he switched to ski jumping as there were no other British ski jumpers with whom to compete for a place.

== Ski jumping career ==
=== Early jumping ===
Edwards began jumping under the supervision of John Viscome and Chuck Berghorn in Lake Placid, New York, using Berghorn's equipment, although he had to wear six pairs of socks to make the boots fit. He was disadvantaged by his weight—at about 82 kilograms (181 pounds; 12 stone 13 pounds), more than 9 kg (20 lb) heavier than the next heaviest competitor—and by his lack of financial support for training, being totally self-funded. Another problem was that he was very far-sighted, wearing thick glasses under his goggles, which would mist up at altitude.

Edwards first represented Great Britain at the 1987 World Championships in Oberstdorf in Bavaria, and was ranked 55th in the world. This performance qualified him as the sole British applicant for the 1988 Winter Olympics ski jumping competition. He received confirmation of his qualification for the games while working as a plasterer and temporarily residing in a Finnish mental hospital, due to lack of funds for alternative accommodation rather than as a patient.

=== 1988 Winter Olympics ===
During the 1988 Winter Olympics in Calgary, Edwards competed in and finished last in both the 70 m and 90 m events. In the 70 m, he scored 69.2 points from two jumps of 55.0 m; second-last Bernat Solà Pujol of Spain scored 140.4 points from 71 m and 68.5 m jumps; winner Matti Nykänen of Finland had 229.1 points from 89.5 m jumps. In the 90 m, Edwards scored 57.5 points from 71 m and 67 m jumps; second-last Todd Gilman of Canada had 110.8 points from 96 m and 86.5 m; Nykänen won again, with 224 points from 118.5 m and 107 m.

From the beginning, the press version of his story was "embroidered with falsehoods". Edwards commented, "They said I was afraid of heights. But I was doing sixty jumps a day then, which is hardly something someone who was afraid of heights would do." His lack of success endeared him to people around the globe. He subsequently became a media celebrity and appeared on talk shows around the world, appearing on The Tonight Show Starring Johnny Carson during the Games. Press outlets nicknamed him "Mr. Magoo", and one Italian journalist called him a "ski dropper".

At the closing ceremony, the president of the Organising Committee, Frank King, singled out Edwards for his contribution. King said, addressing the competitors, "You have broken world records and you have established personal bests. Some of you have even soared like an eagle." Others, including Bengt-Erik Bengtsson, head of the Nordic division of the International Ski Federation, criticised Edwards as being an Olympic tourist and distracting attention away from the accomplishment of other more capable athletes. The East German newspaper Junge Welt labelled Edwards a "clown".

==== "Eddie the Eagle" Rule ====
Following the widespread attention that Edwards received in Calgary shortly after the Olympics finished, the entry requirements were made stricter, making it nearly impossible for anyone to follow his example: the International Olympic Committee (IOC) instituted what became known as the Eddie the Eagle Rule, which requires Olympic hopefuls to compete in international events and be placed in the top 30 per cent or the top 50 competitors, whichever is fewer.

Edwards failed to qualify for the 1992 Winter Olympics in Albertville, or the 1994 Games in Lillehammer. He got a five-year sponsorship from Eagle Airlines, a small British charter company, to support his attempt to reach the 1998 Games in Nagano; by this time he was reportedly jumping distances of 85m and 115m on the 90m and 120m jumps respectively, but he failed to qualify for those as well.

=== Return to Calgary and other media appearances ===
On 13 February 2008, Edwards made a return visit to Calgary to take part in festivities marking the twentieth anniversary of the Games. During his visit, he rode the zip-line at Canada Olympic Park with a member of the Jamaican bobsled team (the ride simulates the speed of a ski jumper) and led a procession of skiers down the slopes of the park while carrying an Olympic torch.

Edwards was chosen as a torchbearer in the relay for the 2010 Vancouver Olympics. He ran with the torch on 7 January 2010 in Winnipeg.

Edwards released a book (and a video) called On the Piste. In 1991, he recorded a single in Finnish entitled "Mun nimeni on Eetu" ("My name is Eetu"), B-sided with "Eddien Siivellä" ("On Eddie's Wing"), though he does not speak Finnish. Edwards learned the lyrics phonetically and the song reached No. 2 in the Finnish charts. "Mun nimeni on Eetu" was written by Finnish singer Irwin Goodman.

Edwards appeared in a number of advertising campaigns, e.g. on television, promoting cars, and commanded fees of £10,000 an hour. Nevertheless, he declared bankruptcy in 1992, claiming that a trust fund for his earnings was not set up properly. In 2003, he graduated from De Montfort University in Leicester with a degree in law. "I've been interested in law since taking out a civil action against my trustees 10 years ago", he said in an interview in 2001.

On February 25, 2012, he appeared as a competitor on episode 2 of BBC1's Let's Dance for Sport Relief, 2012 and got through to the final on most public votes. His performances were accompanied by the Royal British Legion Band & Corps of Drums Romford.

In 2013, he won the first series of the British celebrity diving programme Splash!, mentored by Tom Daley.

In January 2014, he commentated on the Channel 4 TV programme The Jump, where 12 famous people took part in winter sports. As part of each episode, Edwards jumped off the largest of three ski jumps. In the same year, he appeared as a guest on the ITV2 comedy show Fake Reaction.

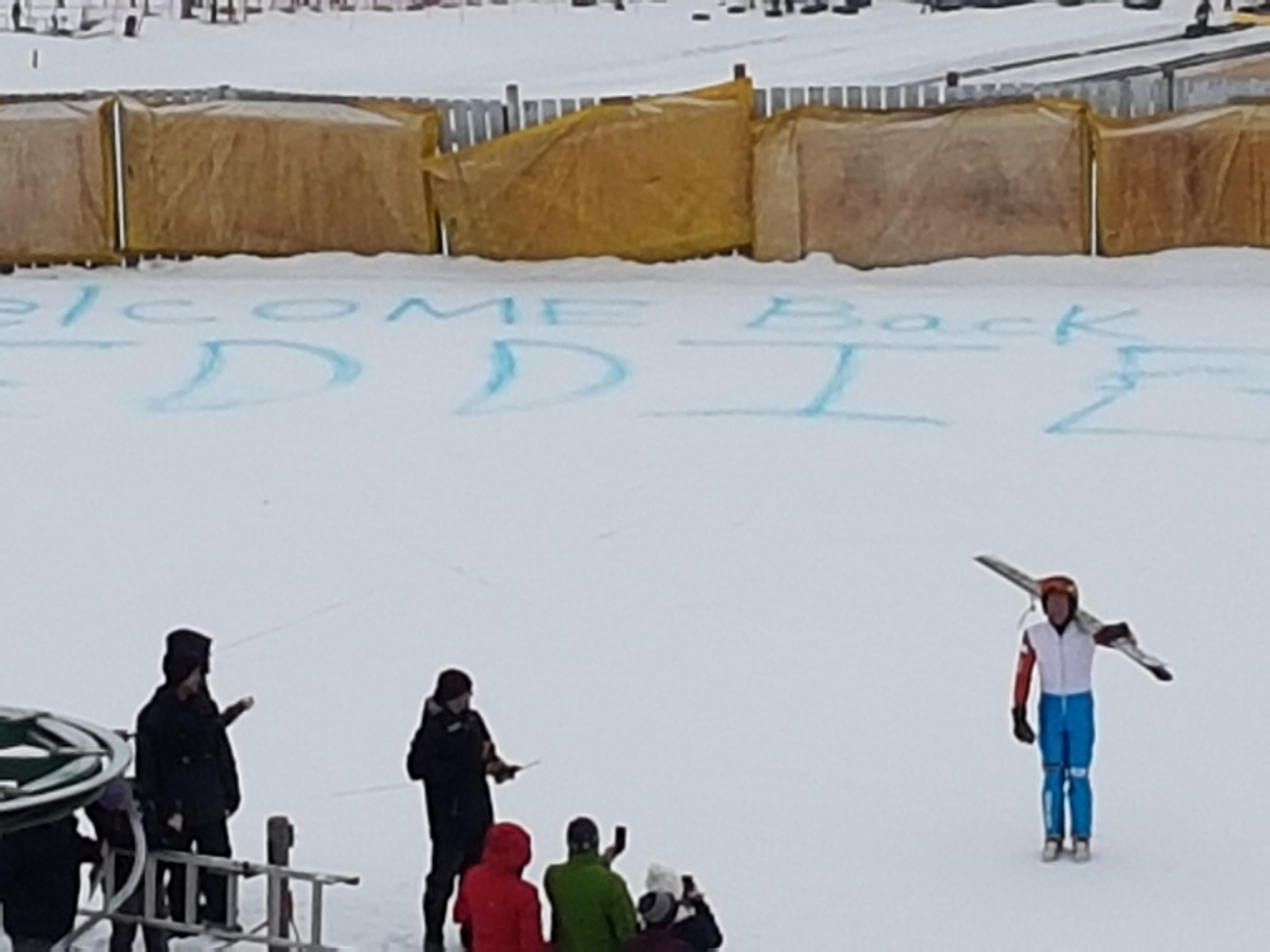
Edwards before his first jumps in 15 years at the site of the 1988 Winter Olympics

In 2017, he returned to the ski jumping facilities at Canada Olympic Park, where he had taken part in the Olympics in 1988, to make some jumps that were his first in over 15 years.

In 2024, he appeared as a contestant on the sixteenth series of Dancing on Ice. Edwards was brought in as a replacement after Stephen Lustig-Webb was forced to withdraw from the series.

== Biopic ==
A biopic chronicling the life story of Edwards had been planned by Irish director Declan Lowney since 2007. Comedian Steve Coogan was originally chosen for the title role, but in 2009 Lowney announced that Rupert Grint would instead play the part. The film was scheduled to begin production once Grint completed work on Harry Potter and the Deathly Hallows – Part 1 and Part 2, but did not go ahead.

In March 2015, it was announced that 20th Century Fox had acquired the film, with Taron Egerton and Hugh Jackman starring and Dexter Fletcher directing, from a screenplay by Sean Macaulay and Simon Kelton. Egerton would portray the adult Eddie "The Eagle" Edwards, Tom and Jack Costello younger versions of Edwards, while Jackman would portray his coach, Bronson Peary. It was later announced that Christopher Walken had also joined the film, portraying the role of Bronson Peary's mentor.

The film, Eddie the Eagle, was released in early 2016 and grossed a worldwide total of $46.1 million. In the UK, it grossed $12.8m, making it the highest grossing British film of 2016. On Rotten Tomatoes, the film has a rating of 82% based on 197 reviews, with an average rating of 6.5/10.

== See also ==
- List of uncompetitive athletes

== Bibliography ==
- Edwards, Eddie (2016). Eddie the Eagle: My Story. Graymalkin Media. ISBN 9781631680649.
