= Ski jumping at the Winter Olympics =

- IOC Code: SJP
- Governing body: FIS
- Events: 6 (men: 3; women: 2; mixed: 1)

Winter Olympics
- 1924; 1928; 1932; 1936; 1948; 1952; 1956; 1960; 1964; 1968; 1972; 1976; 1980; 1984; 1988; 1992; 1994; 1998; 2002; 2006; 2010; 2014; 2018; 2022; 2026
- Medalists

Ski jumping has been included in the program of every Winter Olympic Games. From 1924 through to 1956, the competition involved jumping from one hill whose length varied from each edition of the Games to the next.

It is disputed whether the Olympic ski jumping events from 1924 to 1960 were normal hill or large hill competitions. Even the International Olympic Committee (IOC) has no clear consensus on this question.

Most historians have placed the length of the Olympic ski jump hill in 1924 at 70 meters and have classified this as the large hill. (Recent information from the FIS offices in Switzerland have had the K-points from 1924 to 1956 determined as shown below). In 1960, the ski jump hill was standardized to 80 meters. In 1964, a second ski jump, the normal hill at 70 meters (K90) was added along with the 80 meters (K120) large hill. The length of the large hill run in 1968 increased from 80 meters to 90 meters (K120). The team large hill event was added in 1988. By 1992, the ski jumping competitions were referred to by their K-point distances rather than their run length prior to launching from the ski jump (90 meters for the normal hill and 120 meters for the large hill, respectively) and have been that way ever since. For the 2006 Winter Olympics, the normal hill was designated as HS106 (K95) while the large hill was designated as HS140 (K125).

Until 1980, the Winter Olympics also served as the FIS Nordic World Ski Championships for ski jumping in Olympic years. During this period, the Olympic medalists received an additional medal from FIS.

On April 6, 2011, the IOC officially accepted women's ski jumping into the official Olympic program for the 2014 Winter Olympics in Sochi, Russia. On February 11, 2014, Carina Vogt of Germany won the first gold medal for women's ski jumping at the Winter Olympic Games.

== Summary ==
Games	Year	Events	Best nation
1	1924	1	Norway (1)
2	1928	1	Norway (2)
3	1932	1	Norway (3)
4	1936	1	Norway (4)
5	1948	1	Norway (5)
6	1952	1	Norway (6)
7	1956	1	Finland (1)
8	1960	1	United Team of Germany (1)
9	1964	2	Norway (7)
10	1968	2	Czechoslovakia (1)
11	1972	2	Japan (1)
12	1976	2	Austria (1); East Germany (1)
13	1980	2	Austria (2)
14	1984	2	Finland (2)
15	1988	3	Finland (3)

Games	Year	Events	Best nation
16	1992	3	Finland (4)
17	1994	3	Germany (1)
18	1998	3	Japan (2)
19	2002	3	Switzerland (1)
20	2006	3	Austria (3)
21	2010	3	Switzerland (2)
22	2014	4	Germany (2); Poland (1)
23	2018	4	Norway (8)
24	2022	5	Slovenia (1)
25	2026	6	Norway (9)

== Events ==
Event	24	28	32	36	48	52	56	60	64	68	72	76	80	84	88	92	94	98	02	06	10	14	18	22	26	Years
Men's individual large hill	•	•	•	•	•	•	•	•	•	•	•	•	•	•	•	•	•	•	•	•	•	•	•	•	•	25
Men's individual normal hill									•	•	•	•	•	•	•	•	•	•	•	•	•	•	•	•	•	17
Men's team large hill															•	•	•	•	•	•	•	•	•	•	•	11
Women's individual normal hill																						•	•	•	•	4
Mixed normal hill team																								•	•	2
Women's individual large hill																									•	1
Total events	1	1	1	1	1	1	1	1	2	2	2	2	2	2	3	3	3	3	3	3	3	4	4	5	6	

== Medal table ==
Sources (after the 2026 Winter Olympics):
Accurate as of 2026 Winter Olympics.

Rank	Nation	Gold	Silver	Bronze	Total
1	Norway	14	12	15	41
2	Finland	10	8	4	22
3	Austria	8	10	10	28
4	Germany	7	7	3	17
5	Japan	4	7	7	18
6	Poland	4	5	4	13
7	Slovenia	4	3	4	11
8	Switzerland	4	1	1	6
9	East Germany	2	3	2	7
10	Czechoslovakia	1	2	4	7
11	United Team of Germany	1	0	1	2
12	Soviet Union	1	0	0	1
13	Sweden	0	1	1	2
13	Yugoslavia	0	1	1	2
15	ROC	0	1	0	1
16	Canada	0	0	1	1
16	France	0	0	1	1
16	United States	0	0	1	1
Totals (18 entries)		60	61	60	181

Note: There was a tie for silver in the 1980 normal hill competition, and no bronze medal was awarded.

== Number of ski jumpers by nation ==
Nation	24	28	32	36	48	52	56	60	64	68	72	76	80	84	88	92	94	98	02	06	10	14	18	22	26	Years
Austria		1	3	4	4	4	4	4	4	4	3	5	5	5	4	4	4	5	5	4	4	7	8	9	8	24
Belarus																	1	2	1	2						4
Bulgaria														3	2	3			1	2		1	1	1	1	9
Canada		1	8	3	3	2	1	3	3	3	4	4	3	4	4	3				4	4	6	2	4	4	21
China																				4			1	7	6	4
Czech Republic																	4	4	4	5	5	5	5	8	4	9
Czechoslovakia	4	4	4	4	4		2		3	5	5	5	2	5	4	4										14
East Germany										4	5	4	6	5	2											6
Estonia																			3	2		2	3	2	2	6
Finland	4	2		4	4	4	4	4	4	5	4	4	4	4	6	4	5	4	5	5	5	6	6	4	7	24
France	4	3			4	3	4	2		4	4		2	1	2	4	4	2	4		4	8	4	2	5	20
Georgia																	1	1	1							3
Germany		4		4		4										5	5	4	5	5	5	9	9	9	8	13
Great Britain	3^{1}														1				1							3
Greece																						1				1
Hungary	2^{1}			2^{1}	2			1	2	2																6
Iceland					1	1		1																		3
Italy	4	3	3	2	3		4	4	3	1	1	4	1	3	2	3	4	1	1	4	3	5	8	2	7	24
Japan		1	4	4		4	2	4	4	5	5	5	4	4	4	4	4	5	5	5	4	8	9	9	7	23
Kazakhstan																	3	4	4	4	2	1	1	2	2	9
Kyrgyzstan																			1							1
Norway	4	4	8	4	4	4	5	4	5	5	5	4	4	6	5	5	6	5	4	5	5	8	7	9	7	25
Olympic Athletes from Russia																							8			1
Poland	3	4	3	3	4	4	4	1	5	4	4	5	3	2	2	1	1	5	5	5	5	5	5	7	5	25
Romania				1			1									1						1	1	3	4	7
Russia																	4	4	5	4	4	6		9		7
Slovakia																	2	1		1	1				2	5
Slovenia																5	6	5	4	4	5	9	9	9	7	10
South Korea																		4	4	4	3	4	5			6
Soviet Union							4	4	5	4	5	4	4	3	2											9
Spain														3	1											2
Sweden	4	4	3	4	4	4	5	4	4	5	2	2	1		4	5	5							1	1	18
Switzerland	4	4	3	3	4	4	3	1	3	1	4	4	4	3	4	4	2	4	4	4	2	3	2	4	4	25
Turkey																							1	1	2	3
Ukraine																	1	3	1	1	3			3	2	7
Unified Team																4										1
United Team of Germany							4	4	5																	3
United States	3	3	4	4	4	4	4	4	4	5	4	6	6	5	6	4	6	5	5	5	4	7	7	5	6	25
West Germany										4	3	2	3	4	5											6
Yugoslavia				4	4	2	4		4	5	4	4	3	5	5											11
Nations	11	13	10	15	14	13	16	15	15	17	16	15	16	17	19	17	19	19	22	21	18	20	21	22	22	
Ski jumpers	40	38	47	50	49	44	55	45	58	66	62	62	55	65	65	63	68	68	73	79	68	100	100	110	101	
Year	24	28	32	36	48	52	56	60	64	68	72	76	80	84	88	92	94	98	02	06	10	14	18	22	26	

- ^{1} Athletes did not start at the Games.

== See also ==
- List of Olympic venues in ski jumping
