= Balanche =

Balanche is a surname. Notable people with the surname include:

- Camille Balanche (born 1990), Swiss cyclist
- Fabrice Balanche (born 1969), French geographer
- Gérard Balanche (born 1964), Swiss ski jumper
