= Ski jumping at the 1988 Winter Olympics =

Ski jumping at the XV Olympic Winter Games
- Pictogram for ski jumping
- Venue: Canada Olympic Park
- Dates: February 14–24, 1988
- No. of events: 3
- Competitors: 65 from 19 nations

Ski jumping at the 1988 Winter Olympics consisted of three events held from 14 February to 24 February, taking place at Canada Olympic Park. The Calgary Games featured the addition of a new event, the first program change since 1964, with the debut of the team event. Britain's Eddie "The Eagle" Edwards achieved celebrity by finishing last in both individual events, with less than half the points of the second-last competitor.

== Medal summary ==
=== Medal table ===
Rank	Nation	Gold	Silver	Bronze	Total
1	Finland	3	0	0	3
2	Czechoslovakia	0	1	1	2
2	Norway	0	1	1	2
2	Yugoslavia	0	1	1	2
Totals (4 entries)		3	3	3	9

Finland led the medal table, winning all three gold medals, Matti Nykänen taking both individual events and helping the Finnish team to victory. Given that this was the first year in which there were three ski jumping event, this made Nykänen the most successful ski jumper in a single Games.

The two medals for Yugoslavia were the only ones that country would win in ski jumping (though Slovenia, where all four Yugoslavian team members were from, would win its first as an independent country in 2002).

=== Events ===
Event	Gold		Silver		Bronze	
Normal hill individual	Matti Nykänen; Finland	229.1	Pavel Ploc; Czechoslovakia	212.1	Jiří Malec; Czechoslovakia	211.8
Large hill individual	Matti Nykänen; Finland	224.0	Erik Johnsen; Norway	207.9	Matjaž Debelak; Yugoslavia	207.7
Large hill team	Finland; Ari-Pekka Nikkola; Matti Nykänen; Tuomo Ylipulli; Jari Puikkonen	634.4	Yugoslavia; Primož Ulaga; Matjaž Zupan; Matjaž Debelak; Miran Tepeš	625.5	Norway; Ole Christian Eidhammer; Jon Inge Kjørum; Ole Gunnar Fidjestøl; Erik Johnsen	596.1

== Participating NOCs ==
Nineteen nations participated in ski jumping at the Calgary Games. Great Britain made their Olympic ski jumping debut, with Eddie "The Eagle" Edwards their sole participant.

- Austria (4)
- Bulgaria (2)
- Canada (4)
- Spain (1)
- Finland (6)
- France (2)
- West Germany (5)
- Great Britain (1)
- East Germany (2)
- Italy (2)
- Japan (4)
- Norway (5)
- Poland (2)
- Switzerland (4)
- Sweden (4)
- Czechoslovakia (4)
- Soviet Union (2)
- United States (6)
- Yugoslavia (5)
