= Lotrič =

Lotrič is a surname. Notable people with the surname include:

- Mitja Lotrič (born 1994), Slovenian footballer
- Rajko Lotrič (born 1962), Yugoslavian ski jumper
