= Tadashi Nakamura =

Tadashi Nakamura may refer to:

- Tadashi Nakamura (biathlete) (中村 忠, born 1956), Japanese biathlete
- Tadashi Nakamura (filmmaker) (born c. 1980), Japanese-American filmmaker
- Tadashi Nakamura (footballer) (中村 忠, born 1971), Japanese footballer and manager
- Tadashi Nakamura (voice actor) (中村 正, 1929–2019), Japanese voice actor
