= Jan Kowal =

Polish ski jumper

Personal information
- Nationality: Polish
- Born: 8 July 1967 (age 57); Zakopane, Poland

Sport
- Sport: Ski jumping

Jan Kowal (born 8 July 1967) is a Polish ski jumper. He competed in the normal hill and large hill events at the 1988 Winter Olympics.
