= Eduard Suboch =

Soviet ski jumper

Personal information
- Nationality: Soviet
- Born: 11 May 1969 (age 55); Chernogorsk, Soviet Union

Sport
- Sport: Ski jumping

Eduard Anatoliyevich Suboch (Russian: Эдуард Анатольевич Субоч) (born 11 May 1969) is a Soviet ski jumper. He competed in the normal hill event at the 1988 Winter Olympics.
