= Martin Švagerko =

Czechoslovak/Slovak former ski jumper (born 1967)

Personal information
- Nationality: Czechoslovakia; Slovakia (1993-94)
- Born: 2 October 1967 (age 58) Banská Bystrica, Czechoslovakia
- Height: 1.80 m (5 ft 11 in)

Sport
- Sport: Skiing

World Cup career
- Seasons: 1983–1991; 1993–1994
- Indiv. starts: 98*
- Indiv. podiums: 2
- Indiv. wins: 1
Medal record
Men's ski jumping
FIS Nordic World Ski Championships
Silver medal – second place	1993 Falun	Team LH
Bronze medal – third place	1989 Lahti	Team LH
- Updated on 10 February 2016

Martin Švagerko (born 2 October 1967) is a Czechoslovak/Slovak former ski jumper.

== Career ==
He won two team large hill medals at the FIS Nordic World Ski Championships with a silver in 1993 and a bronze in 1989.

Svagerko's best individual finish at the Winter Olympics was 25th in the individual normal hill at Lillehammer in 1994. He also finished 28th in the 1990 Ski-flying World Championships in Norway.

Svagerko had two individual normal hill victories in his career (1984, 1986).

== World Cup ==
=== Standings ===
Season	Overall	4H	SF
1982/83	63	—	N/A
1983/84	—	63	N/A
1984/85	53	16	N/A
1985/86	24	45	N/A
1986/87	29	21	N/A
1987/88	24	60	N/A
1988/89	25	17	N/A
1989/90	50	46	N/A
1990/91	—	50	—
1992/93	46	62	—
1993/94	43	29	—

=== Wins ===
No.	Season	Date	Location	Hill	Size
1	1986/87	21 December 1986	(France) Chamonix	Le Mont K95	NH
