= 1988–89 FIS Ski Jumping World Cup =

10th season of the FIS Ski Jumping World Cup

1988–89 World Cup
Winners
- Overall: (Sweden) Jan Boklöv
- Four Hills Tournament: (Finland) Risto Laakkonen
- Bohemia Tournament: (Norway) Jon Inge Kjørum
- K.O.P. Ski Flying Week: (Norway) Ole Gunnar Fidjestøl
- Nations Cup: Norway

Competitions
- Venues: 15
- Individual: 20
- Cancelled: 5

The 1988–89 FIS Ski Jumping World Cup was the 10th World Cup season in ski jumping.

Season began in Thunder Bay, Canada on 3 December 1988 and finished in Planica, Yugoslavia on 26 March 1989. The individual World Cup overall winner was Jan Boklöv, one of the pioneers of modern V-style (as the only one this season in this tehnique easily surpassed everyone else with parallel style by a few meters) and Nations Cup was taken by Team of Norway.

Events in Oberhof were moved from large to normal hill due to lack of snow. And total 3 events were cancelled; Bærum and Falun (due to lack of snow) and Harrachov (due to bad weather).

20 men's individual events on 14 different venues in 11 countries were held on three different continents (Europe, Asia and North America). Two competition were cancelled this season.

Peaks of the season were FIS Nordic World Ski Championships, Four Hills Tournament, Bohemia Tournament and K.O.P. International Ski Flying Week.

== Map of world cup hosts ==
Europe
West & East Germany	Austria Asia	North America

== Calendar ==
=== Men's Individual ===
N – normal hill / L – large hill / F – flying hill
All	No.	Date	Place (Hill)	Size	Winner	Second	Third	Overall leader (Note: Yellow bib for the overall leader was newly introduced this season.)	Ref.
209	1	3 December 1988	(Canada) Thunder Bay (Big Thunder K89, K120)	N _{076}	(West Germany) Dieter Thoma	(Finland) Risto Laakkonen	(Finland) Matti Nykänen	(West Germany) Dieter Thoma	
210	2	4 December 1988	(Canada) Thunder Bay (Big Thunder K89, K120)	L _{118}	(Finland) Risto Laakkonen	(Norway) Erik Johnsen	(West Germany) Dieter Thoma	(Finland) Risto Laakkonen	
211	3	10 December 1988	(United States) Lake Placid (MacKenzie Int. K114, K86)	L _{119}	(Sweden) Jan Boklöv	(Austria) Ernst Vettori	(Finland) Pekka Suorsa	(Finland) Risto Laakkonen	
212	4	11 December 1988	(United States) Lake Placid (MacKenzie Int. K114, K86)	N _{077}	(Norway) Vegard Opaas	(Austria) Ernst Vettori	(West Germany) Thomas Klauser	(Finland) Risto Laakkonen	
213	5	17 December 1988	(Japan) Sapporo (Miyanomori K90) (Ōkurayama K115)	N _{078}	(Finland) Matti Nykänen	(West Germany) Dieter Thoma	(Norway) Clas Brede Bråthen	(West Germany) Dieter Thoma	
214	6	18 December 1988	(Japan) Sapporo (Miyanomori K90) (Ōkurayama K115)	L _{120}	(Sweden) Jan Boklöv	(Finland) Ari-Pekka Nikkola	(Finland) Matti Nykänen	(West Germany) Dieter Thoma	
215	7	30 December 1988	(West Germany) Oberstdorf (Schattenbergschanze K115)	L _{121}	(West Germany) Dieter Thoma	(Finland) Risto Laakkonen	(Finland) Matti Nykänen	(West Germany) Dieter Thoma	
216	8	1 January 1989	(West Germany) Garmisch-Pa (Große Olympiaschanze K107)	L _{122}	(Finland) Matti Nykänen	(East Germany) Jens Weißflog	(Finland) Risto Laakkonen	(West Germany) Dieter Thoma	
217	9	4 January 1989	(Austria) Innsbruck (Bergiselschanze K109)	L _{123}	(Sweden) Jan Boklöv	(Finland) Ari-Pekka Nikkola	(East Germany) Jens Weißflog	(West Germany) Dieter Thoma	
218	10	6 January 1989	(Austria) Bischofshofen (Paul-Ausserleitner K111)	L _{124}	(United States) Mike Holland	(Finland) Ari-Pekka Nikkola	(Sweden) Jan Boklöv	(West Germany) Dieter Thoma	
37th Four Hills Tournament Overall (30 December 1988 – 6 January 1989)					(Finland) Risto Laakkonen	(Finland) Matti Nykänen	(East Germany) Jens Weißflog	4H Tournament	
219	11	14 January 1989	(Czechoslovakia) Liberec (Ještěd A K120)	L _{125}	(Czechoslovakia) Pavel Ploc (Norway) Jon Inge Kjørum		(Finland) Ari-Pekka Nikkola	(West Germany) Dieter Thoma	
220	12	15 January 1989	(Czechoslovakia) Harrachov (Čerťák K120)	L _{126}	(Sweden) Jan Boklöv	(Finland) Risto Laakkonen	(Czechoslovakia) Ladislav Dluhoš	(Sweden) Jan Boklöv	
25th Bohemia Tournament Overall (14 – 15 January 1989)					(Norway) Jon Inge Kjørum	(Czechoslovakia) Pavel Ploc	(Czechoslovakia) Ladislav Dluhoš	Bohemia Tournament	
		21 January 1989	(East Germany) Oberhof (Hans-Renner-Schanze K116) (Rennsteigschanze K90)	L _{cnx}	moved to normal hill due to lack of snow			—	
		22 January 1989	(East Germany) Oberhof (Hans-Renner-Schanze K116) (Rennsteigschanze K90)	L _{cnx}	moved to normal hill due to lack of snow			—	
221	13	(Note: Cancelled large hill event from Oberhof (21 January) was rescheduled to normal hill on same day.)21 January 1989	(East Germany) Oberhof (Hans-Renner-Schanze K116) (Rennsteigschanze K90)	N _{079}	(Norway) Ole G. Fidjestøl	(East Germany) Jens Weißflog	(East Germany) Ingo Züchner	(Sweden) Jan Boklöv	
222	14	(Note: Cancelled large hill event from Oberhof (22 January) was rescheduled to normal hill on same day.)22 January 1989	(East Germany) Oberhof (Hans-Renner-Schanze K116) (Rennsteigschanze K90)	N _{080}	(East Germany) Jens Weißflog	(Norway) Ole G. Fidjestøl	(Norway) Jon Inge Kjørum	(Sweden) Jan Boklöv	
223	15	28 January 1989	(France) Chamonix (Le Mont K95)	N _{081}	(Sweden) Jan Boklöv	(Italy) Roberto Cecon	(West Germany) Josef Heumann	(Sweden) Jan Boklöv	
FIS Nordic World Ski Championships 1989 (20 – 26 February • (Finland) Lahti)
		2 March 1989	(Norway) Bærum (Skuibakken K110)	L _{cnx}	cancelled due to lack of snow			—	
224	16	5 March 1989	(Norway) Oslo (Holmenkollbakken K105)	L _{127}	(East Germany) Jens Weißflog	(Norway) Jon Inge Kjørum	(Norway) Kent Johanssen	(Sweden) Jan Boklöv	
225	17	8 March 1989	(Sweden) Örnsköldsvik (Paradiskullen K82)	N _{082}	(East Germany) Jens Weißflog	(Finland) Ari-Pekka Nikkola	(Sweden) Jan Boklöv	(Sweden) Jan Boklöv	
		12 March 1989	(Sweden) Falun (Lugnet K112)	L _{cnx}	cancelled due to lack of snow			—	
		18 March 1989	(Czechoslovakia) Harrachov (Čerťák K180)	F _{cnx}	cancelled due to impossible weather conditions			—	
226	18	19 March 1989	(Czechoslovakia) Harrachov (Čerťák K180)	F _{017}	(Norway) Ole G. Fidjestøl	(United States) Mike Holland	(Sweden) Jan Boklöv	(Sweden) Jan Boklöv	
35th K.O.P. International Ski Flying Week Overall (18 – 19 March 1989)					(Norway) Ole G. Fidjestøl	(United States) Mike Holland	(Sweden) Jan Boklöv	K.O.P.	
227	19	25 March 1989	(Socialist Federal Republic of Yugoslavia) Planica (Srednja Bloudkova K90) (Bloudkova velikanka K120)	N _{083}	(East Germany) Jens Weißflog	(Austria) Andreas Felder	(Finland) Ari-Pekka Nikkola	(Sweden) Jan Boklöv	
228	20	26 March 1989	(Socialist Federal Republic of Yugoslavia) Planica (Srednja Bloudkova K90) (Bloudkova velikanka K120)	L _{128}	(East Germany) Jens Weißflog	(Norway) Kent Johanssen	(Austria) Andreas Felder	(Sweden) Jan Boklöv	
10th FIS World Cup Overall (3 December 1988 – 26 March 1989)					(Sweden) Jan Boklöv	(East Germany) Jens Weißflog	(West Germany) Dieter Thoma	World Cup Overall	

== Standings ==
=== Overall ===
Rank	after 20 events	Points
1	(Sweden) Jan Boklöv	247
2	(East Germany) Jens Weißflog	192
3	(West Germany) Dieter Thoma	167
4	(Norway) Ole Gunnar Fidjestøl	145
5	(Finland) Ari-Pekka Nikkola	136
6	(Norway) Jon Inge Kjørum	133
7	(Finland) Risto Laakkonen	132
8	(Austria) Ernst Vettori	125
9	(Finland) Matti Nykänen	106
10	(West Germany) Josef Heumann	84

=== Nations Cup ===
Rank	after 20 events	Points
1	Norway	473
2	Finland	460
3	Austria	348
4	West Germany	341
5	Czechoslovakia	263
	Sweden	263
	East Germany	263
8	Yugoslavia	113
9	Italy	90
10	United States	81

=== Four Hills Tournament ===
Rank	after 4 events	Points
1	(Finland) Risto Laakkonen	841.0
2	(Finland) Matti Nykänen	838.5
2	(East Germany) Jens Weißflog	838.5
4	(West Germany) Dieter Thoma	836.0
5	(Sweden) Jan Boklöv	833.5
6	(Norway) Jon Inge Kjørum	831.0
7	(Austria) Ernst Vettori	821.0
8	(United States) Mike Holland	802.5
9	(West Germany) Thomas Klauser	792.0
10	(Norway) Ole Gunnar Fidjestøl	790.5

=== Bohemia Tournament ===
Rank	after 2 events	Points
1	(Norway) Jon Inge Kjørum	405.0
2	(Czechoslovakia) Pavel Ploc	403.5
3	(Norway) Ladislav Dluhoš	396.8
↓ . . . . . . uncompleted order . . . . . . ↓
N/A	(Austria) Andreas Rauschmeier	387.0
N/A	(Norway) Ole Gunnar Fidjestøl	395.5
N/A	(United States) Mike Holland	391.0
N/A	(Czechoslovakia) Jiří Parma	383.5
N/A	(Finland) Clas Brede Bråthen	378.5

== See also ==
- 1988–89 FIS Europa Cup (2nd level competition)
