= Atsushi Egawa =

Japanese cross-country skier (born 1966)

Personal information
- Nationality: Japanese
- Born: 5 April 1966 (age 58); Hokkaido, Japan

Sport
- Sport: Cross-country skiing

Atsushi Egawa (江川 淳, Egawa Atsushi, born 5 April 1966) is a Japanese cross-country skier. He competed in the men's 30 kilometre classical event at the 1988 Winter Olympics.
