= Kazuoki Kodama =

Japanese Nordic combined skier

Medal record

Men's Nordic combined

World Championships
Bronze medal – third place	1991 Val di Fiemme	3 x 10 km team

Kazuoki Kodama (児玉 和興, Kodama Kazauoki)(born June 8, 1965) is a Japanese Nordic combined skier who competed from 1989 to 1991. He won a bronze medal in the 3 x 10 km team event at the 1991 FIS Nordic World Ski Championships in Val di Fiemme. He also competed at the 1988 Winter Olympics.
