= Yasumitsu Kanehama =

Japanese speed skater (born 1963)

Personal information
- Nationality: Japanese
- Born: 2 June 1963 (age 63) Aomori, Japan

Sport
- Sport: Speed skating

Yasumitsu Kanehama (born 2 June 1963) is a Japanese speed skater. He competed in two events at the 1988 Winter Olympics.
