= Yoshiyuki Shimizu =

Japanese speed skater (born 1969)

Personal information
- Nationality: Japanese
- Born: 21 November 1969 (age 56) Haruna, Japan

Sport
- Sport: Speed skating

Yoshiyuki Shimizu (清水 祥之, Shimizu Yoshiyuki; born 21 November 1969) is a Japanese speed skater. He competed in three events at the 1988 Winter Olympics.
