= Royal British Legion Band & Corps of Drums Romford =

Marching band

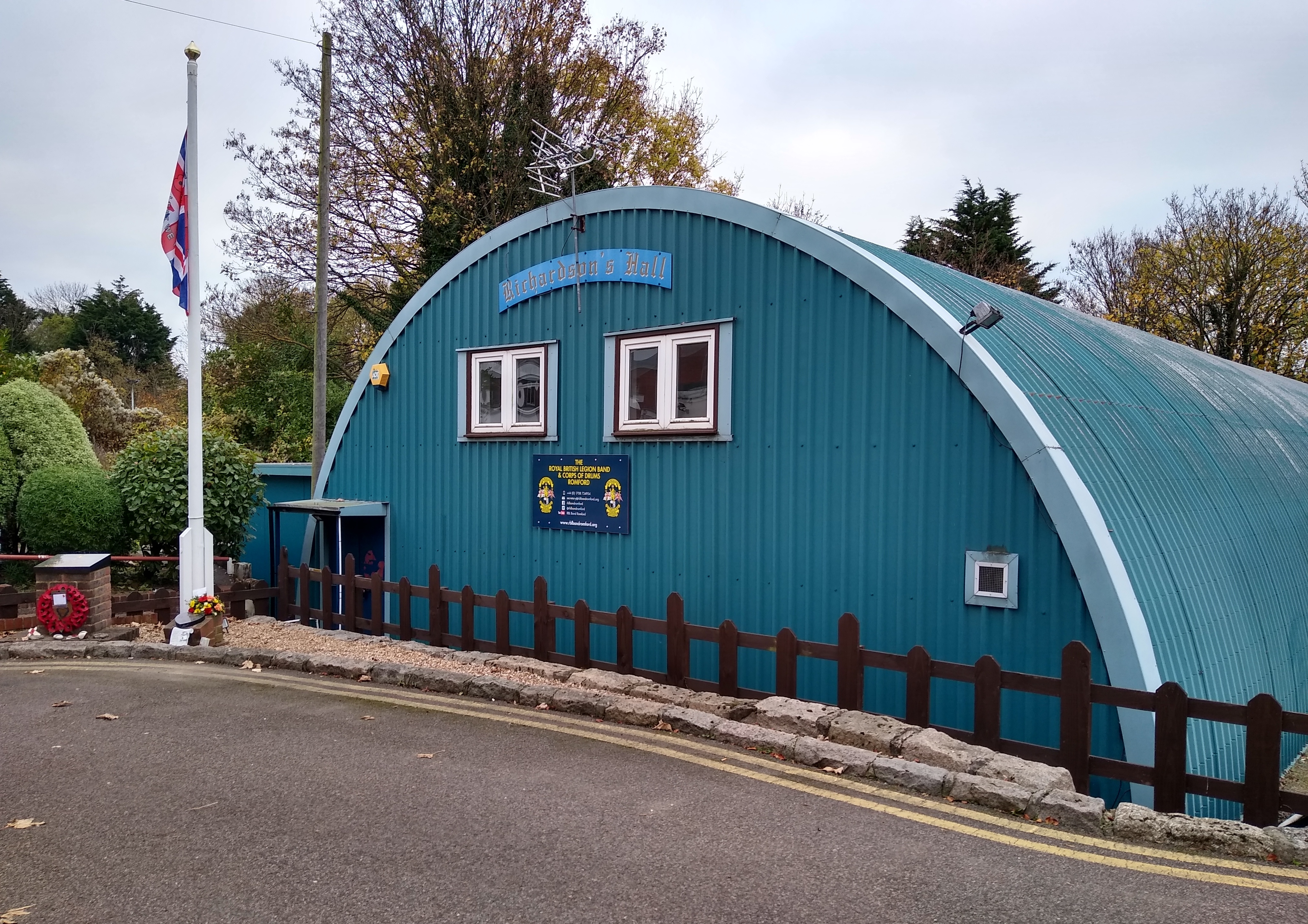
- Location: Romford, United Kingdom
- Conference: TYMBA
- Founded: 1952
- Director: Ian Yeoman

The Royal British Legion Band & Corps of Drums Romford are a marching band based in Romford, London. The band celebrated their Platinum Jubilee in 2012.

In 2009 the band competed in the World Music Contest in Kerkrade and won two Gold diploma awards whilst representing the United Kingdom. This now leaves the band with a total of 10 World Titles awarded since first competing on the World stage in 1993.

The band was the first band ever to perform a clean sweep in the 2006 TYMBA contests, by winning every single trophy on offer and thus claiming the title "Supreme Champions".

The Band was founded in 1952 by Mr Peter Richardson B.E.M and is one of the longest running independent youth bands in this country today, membership is usually 70+. They were the first youth band to appear at the Edinburgh Military Tattoo and have performed alongside almost every band of Her Majesty's Armed Forces at many different military events both in the UK and abroad.

== History ==
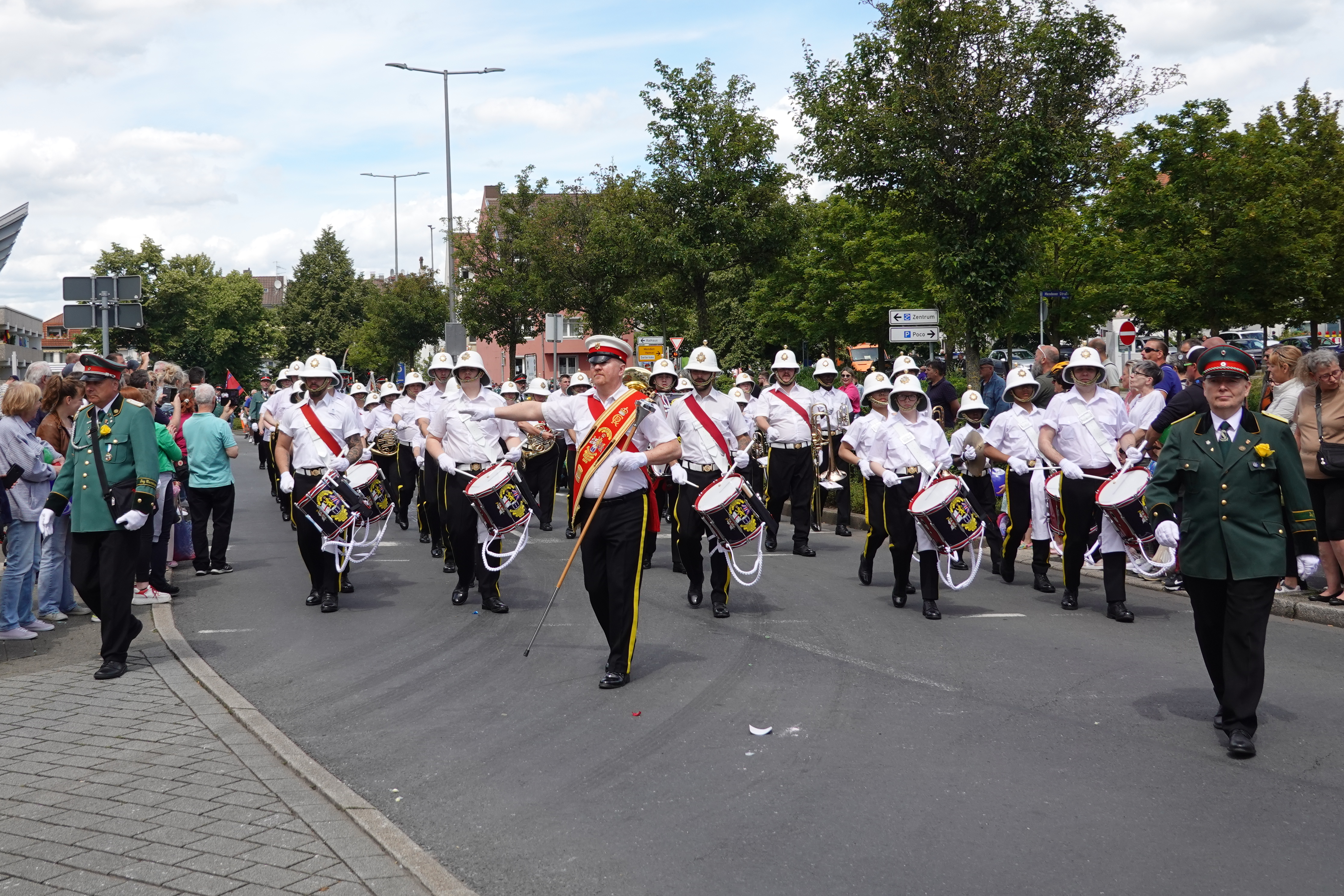
The Royal British Legion Band & Corps of Drums Romford at the 2024 parade of the Iserlohner Bürger-Schützen-Verein 1705 in Iserlohn

The Band Hall was built in 1959 by parents of band members and over the years has been patched up so the band could go on rehearsing throughout the year regardless of the weather, but unfortunately time took its toll on the hall and it was in a bad state of repair. In 1996 the band were awarded a lottery grant of £315,000,000 towards the cost of a new roof and total refurbishment of the interior. Once the new roof was in place, parents and present band members completely refurbished the interior of the hall, spending almost every weekend for the best part of a year rebuilding it to the standard it is today.

== Fundraising ==
Although the band carry the name Royal British Legion, they receive no financial support from the Royal British Legion. All money is raised by dedicated parents and supporters. The biggest asset the band possess is its own premises. Much of the fundraising is done through the Fund Raising Committee whose sole purpose is to provide all uniforms for staff and band members, some instruments, instrument repairs and upkeep of the bandhall. The Fund Raising Committee exists to promote and maintain the principles of independence that is the cornerstone of the organisation. This they do through fundraising, and this is the only function (together with organising supporters coaches) that the committee is involved in. These funds come under the control of a mandate that stipulates what the funds should be used for.
