= Katsuhito Kumagai =

Japanese alpine skier (born 1964)

Personal information
- Nationality: Japanese
- Born: 3 October 1964 (age 62) Aomori, Japan

Sport
- Sport: Alpine skiing

Katsuhito Kumagai (born 3 October 1964) is a Japanese alpine skier. He competed in four events at the 1988 Winter Olympics.
