= Tomaž Dolar =

Slovenian ski jumper

Personal information
- Nationality: Slovenian
- Born: 27 October 1966 (age 58); Jesenice, Yugoslavia

Sport
- Sport: Ski jumping

Tomaž Dolar (born 27 October 1966) is a Slovenian ski jumper. He competed in the large hill event at the 1984 Winter Olympics.
