= Takao Sakai =

Japanese bobsledder (born 1959)

Personal information
- Nationality: Japanese
- Born: 31 October 1959 (age 65); Hokkaido, Japan

Sport
- Sport: Bobsleigh

Takao Sakai (堺 孝夫, Sakai Takao, born 31 October 1959) is a Japanese bobsledder. He competed in the two man and the four man events at the 1988 Winter Olympics.
