= Masaharu Yamazaki =

Japanese cross-country skier (born 1968)

Personal information
- Nationality: Japanese
- Born: 21 May 1968 (age 56); Niigata, Japan

Sport
- Sport: Cross-country skiing

Masaharu Yamazaki (山崎 正晴, Yamazaki Masaharu, born 21 May 1968) is a Japanese cross-country skier. He competed in the men's 15 kilometre classical event at the 1988 Winter Olympics.
