= Tuomo Ylipulli =

Finnish ski jumper (1965–2021)

Personal information
- Full name: Tuomo Sakari Ylipulli
- Nationality: Finland
- Born: 3 March 1965 Rovaniemi, Finland
- Died: 23 July 2021 (aged 56)

Sport
- Sport: Skiing

World Cup career
- Seasons: 1983–1988
- Indiv. starts: 48*
- Indiv. podiums: 5
- Indiv. wins: 1
Medal record
Men's ski jumping
Olympic Games
Gold medal – first place	1988 Calgary	Team LH
FIS Nordic World Ski Championships
Gold medal – first place	1985 Seefeld	Team LH
Gold medal – first place	1987 Oberstdorf	Team LH
- Updated on 10 February 2016

Tuomo Sakari Ylipulli (3 March 1965 – 23 July 2021) was a Finnish ski jumper.

== Career ==
Tuomo Ylipulli won a gold medal in the Team large hill competition at the 1988 Winter Olympics in Calgary. His biggest successes were in the Team large hill event at the FIS Nordic World Ski Championships, where he won two gold medals (1985, 1987). He was the brother of Nordic combined skier Jukka Ylipulli and fellow ski jumpers Raimo Ylipulli and Heikki Ylipulli.

== World Cup ==
=== Standings ===
Season	Overall	4H
1982/83	37	48
1983/84	49	46
1984/85	23	31
1985/86	33	—
1986/87	15	13
1987/88	27	9

=== Wins ===
No.	Season	Date	Location	Hill	Size
1	1986/87	6 January 1987	(Austria) Bischofshofen	Paul-Ausserleitner-Schanze K111	LH

== See also ==
- List of Olympic medalist families
