= Bernat Sola =

Spanish former ski jumper (born 1965)

Bernat Solà Pujol
Personal information
- Born: September 5, 1965 (age 60) Mataró, Spain

Sport
- Sport: Skiing

Achievements and titles
- Personal bests: 141.0 m (Tauplitz, 1986)

Bernat Solà Pujol (born 5 September 1965 in Mataró) is a Spanish former ski jumper.

Solà has competed in the 1984 and 1988 Winter Olympics, the 1985, 1987 and 1989 FIS Nordic World Ski Championships and 1990 Ski Flying World Championships. He is also holding the national record with 141.0 meters at Tauplitz in 1986.

At the World Cup his personal best is 14th place in Sapporo during the 1986–87 season. This was also his only points he scored in the World Cup.
