= Shinichi Tanaka (ski jumper) =

Japanese ski jumper

Personal information
- Nationality: Japanese
- Born: 15 May 1959 (age 66) Hokkaido, Japan

Sport
- Sport: Ski jumping

Shinichi Tanaka (田中 信一, Tanaka Shin'ichi; born 15 May 1959) is a Japanese ski jumper. He competed in the normal hill and large hill events at the 1988 Winter Olympics.
