= Katsushi Tao =

Japanese ski jumper

Personal information
- Nationality: Japanese
- Born: 1 May 1963 (age 61); Hokkaido, Japan

Sport
- Sport: Ski jumping

Katsushi Tao (田尾 克史, Tao Katsushi, born 1 May 1963) is a Japanese ski jumper. He competed in the normal hill and large hill events at the 1988 Winter Olympics.
