= Matjaž Debelak =

Slovenian ski jumper (born 1965)

Medal record

Men's ski jumping

Representing Yugoslavia

Olympic Games
Silver medal – second place	1988 Calgary	Team large hill
Bronze medal – third place	1988 Calgary	Individual large hill

Matjaž Debelak (born 27 August 1965, in Braslovče) is a Slovenian former ski jumper who competed for Yugoslavia from 1986 to 1990.

His best-known successes were at the 1988 Winter Olympics, where he earned two medals with a silver in the team large hill event and a bronze in the individual large hill event. Debelak's best finish at the FIS Nordic World Ski Championships was a 6th in the individual normal hill in 1989.
