= Christoph Lehmann (ski jumper) =

Swiss ski jumper

Christoph Lehmann (born 28 December 1968) is a Swiss former ski jumper who competed from 1988 to 1993. He finished eighth in the team large hill event at the 1988 Winter Olympics in Calgary.

At the 1989 FIS Nordic World Ski Championships in Lahti, Lehmann earned his best finish of 44th in the individual large hill event. He finished 38th at the 1990 Ski-flying World Championships in Vikersund.

Lehmann's best World Cup career finish was ninth in a normal hill event in West Germany in 1988.
