= Erik Johnsen =

Norwegian former ski jumper (born 1965)

Personal information
- Nationality: Norway
- Born: 4 July 1965 (age 61) Oslo, Norway
- Height: 178 cm (5 ft 10 in)

Sport
- Sport: Skiing

World Cup career
- Seasons: 1987–1989; 1991
- Indiv. starts: 20
- Indiv. podiums: 6
- Indiv. wins: 2
Medal record
Men's ski jumping
Olympic Games
Silver medal – second place	1988 Calgary	Individual LH
Bronze medal – third place	1988 Calgary	Team LH
- Updated on 10 February 2016

Erik Johnsen (born 4 July 1965) is a Norwegian former ski jumper.

== Career ==
His best-known successes were at the 1988 Winter Olympics, where he earned two medals, with a silver in the large hill event and a bronze in the team event. Johnsen also won the ski jumping competition at the Holmenkollen ski festival in 1988. His career ended due to problems in adjusting from the Daescher technique to the V-style in 1991.

== World Cup ==
=== Standings ===
Season	Overall	4H	SF
1986/87	85	—	N/A
1987/88	7	52	N/A
1988/89	75	24	N/A
1990/91	—	—	—

=== Wins ===
No.	Season	Date	Location	Hill	Size
1	1987/88	18 March 1988	(Norway) Meldal	Kløvsteinbakken K105	LH
2	1987/88	20 March 1988	(Norway) Oslo	Holmenkollbakken K105	LH
