= Rajko Lotrič =

Personal information
- Full name: Rajko Lotrič
- Nationality: (Socialist Federal Republic of Yugoslavia) Yugoslavia
- Born: 20 August 1962 (age 63) Jesenice, PR Slovenia, FPR Yugoslavia

Sport
- Sport: Skiing

World Cup career
- Seasons: 1980–1991
- Indiv. podiums: 1
- Updated on 30 Mar 2015

Rajko Lotrič (born 20 August 1962) is a Yugoslavian former ski jumper. He competed at the 1988 Winter Olympics.
