= Ole Christian Eidhammer =

Norwegian former ski jumper (born 1965)

Personal information
- Nationality: Norway
- Born: 15 April 1965 (age 61) Trondheim, Norway

Sport
- Sport: Skiing
Medal record
Men's ski jumping
Representing Norway
Olympic Games
Bronze medal – third place	1988 Calgary	Team large hill
World Championships
Silver medal – second place	1987 Oberstdorf	Team large hill

Ole Christian Eidhammer (born 15 April 1965 in Trondheim) is a Norwegian former ski jumper who competed from 1983 to 1990. His best-known success was at the 1988 Winter Olympics, where he earned a bronze medal in the team large hill event. Eidhammer also won a silver medal in the team large hill at the 1987 FIS Nordic World Ski Championships. He also participated in the 1984 Winter Olympics in Sarajevo with 18th place in the large hill.
