= Todd Gillman =

Canadian ski jumper (born 1967)

Todd Gillman (born 24 February 1967) is a Canadian former ski jumper who competed in the 1988 Winter Olympics. He was born in Winnipeg.
