= Akira Satō (ski jumper) =

Japanese ski jumper

Akira Satō 佐藤 晃
Personal information
- Full name: 佐藤 晃
- Nationality: Japan
- Born: 19 July 1964 (age 62) Kyōgoku, Hokkaidō, Japan
- Height: 1.67 m (5 ft 5 1/2 in)

Sport
- Sport: Skiing

World Cup career
- Seasons: 1986–1992
- Indiv. starts: 25
- Indiv. podiums: 1
- Indiv. wins: 1
- Updated on 10 February 2016

Akira Satō (佐藤 晃, Satō Akira) (born 19 July 1964) is a Japanese former ski jumper. He competed at the 1988 Winter Olympics.

== Career ==
He competed from 1986 to 1992 season. In the World Cup he finished once among the top 10, recording one victory from January 1987 in Sapporo. At the 1985 FIS Nordic World Ski Championships he finished 6th in the team event.

== World Cup ==
=== Standings ===
| Season | Overall | 4H | SF |
|---|---|---|---|
| 1985/86 | — | 76 | N/A |
| 1986/87 | 25 | 47 | N/A |
| 1987/88 | — | — | N/A |
| 1988/89 | — | — | N/A |
| 1989/90 | — | 61 | N/A |
| 1990/91 | — | — | — |
| 1991/92 | 55 | — | — |

=== Wins ===
| No. | Season | Date | Location | Hill | Size |
|---|---|---|---|---|---|
| 1 | 1986/87 | 24 January 1987 | (Japan) Sapporo | Miyanomori K90 | NH |
