= Sandro Sambugaro =

Italian ski jumper

Personal information
- Nationality: Italian
- Born: 6 July 1965 (age 61) Asiago, Italy

Sport
- Sport: Ski jumping

Sandro Sambugaro (born 6 July 1965) is an Italian ski jumper. He competed at the 1984 Winter Olympics and the 1988 Winter Olympics.
