= Christian Hauswirth =

Swiss ski jumper (born 1965)

Christian Hauswirth (born 23 December 1965) is a Swiss ski jumper who competed from 1983 to 1990. He finished eighth in the team large hill event at the 1988 Winter Olympics in Calgary.

Hauswirth also finished 28th at the 1990 Ski-flying World Championships in Vikersund. His best career finish was fourth twice (1986, 1987).
