= Jon Inge Kjørum =

Norwegian former ski jumper (born 1965)

Personal information
- Nationality: Norway
- Born: 23 May 1965 (age 61) Hamar, Norway

Sport
- Sport: Skiing

World Cup career
- Seasons: 1986–1992
- Indiv. starts: 56
- Indiv. podiums: 3
- Indiv. wins: 1
Medal record
Men's ski jumping
Olympic Games
Bronze medal – third place	1988 Calgary	Team LH
FIS Nordic World Ski Championships
Silver medal – second place	1989 Lahti	Team LH
- Updated on 10 February 2016

Jon Inge Kjørum (born 23 May 1965) is a Norwegian former ski jumper.

== Career ==
His best-known success was at the 1988 Winter Olympics, where he earned a bronze medal in the team large hill event. Kjørum also won a silver medal in the team large hill at the 1989 FIS Nordic World Ski Championships in Lahti.

== World Cup ==
=== Standings ===
Season	Overall	4H	SF
1985/86	65	—	N/A
1986/87	57	55	N/A
1987/88	16	12	N/A
1988/89	6	6	N/A
1989/90	32	—	N/A
1990/91	47	—	—
1991/92	—	—	—

=== Wins ===
No.	Season	Date	Location	Hill	Size
1	1988/89	14 January 1989	(Czechoslovakia) Liberec	Ještěd A K120	LH
