= Jiří Malec =

Czech former ski jumper (born 1962)

Medal record

Men's ski jumping

Representing Czechoslovakia

Olympic Games
Bronze medal – third place	1988 Calgary	Individual normal hill

Jiři Malec (Czech pronunciation: [ˈjɪr̝iː ˈmalɛts]; born 24 November 1962, in Vlastiboř) is a Czech former ski jumper who competed for Czechoslovakia from 1985 to 1990. Along with Jan Boklöv and Stefan Zünd, he was an early pioneer of the V-style. Malec won the 1987 Winter Universiade. At the 1988 Winter Olympics in Calgary, he won a bronze in the individual normal hill. Malec subsequently sold his bronze medal to help pay his mortgage.
