= Fabrice Piazzini =

Swiss ski jumper (born 1965)

Fabrice Piazzini (born 9 November 1965) was a Swiss ski jumper who competed from 1984 to 1989. He finished eighth in the team large hill at the 1988 Winter Olympics in Calgary.

Piazzini's best career finish was seventh in a normal hill event in Yugoslavia in 1984.
