= Günther Stranner =

Austrian ski jumper

Medal record

Men's ski jumping

Representing Austria

World Championships
Silver medal – second place	1985 Seefeld	Team large hill

Günther Stranner (born 26 April 1967 in Gmund) is an Austrian former ski jumper who competed from 1984 to 1991. He won silver in the team large hill event at the 1985 FIS Nordic World Ski Championships in Seefeld and earned his best individual finish of 39th in the large hill event at the 1989 FIS Nordic World Ski Championships in Lahti.

Stranner also competed in the Ski Flying World Championships, finishing 5th in the 1988 event. His best individual finish was 3rd twice (1985, 1988) during his career. He also competed at the 1988 Winter Olympics.
