= Anders Daun =

Swedish former ski jumper (born 1963)

Per Anders Daun (born 20 April 1963 in Borås) is a Swedish former ski jumper who competed from 1980 to 1988. He finished seventh in the team large hill event at the 1988 Winter Olympics in Calgary.

Daun's best World Cup career finish was eighth in a large hill event in Norway in 1982.
