= Mark Konopacke =

American ski jumper

Mark John Konopacke (born April 26, 1963, in Iron Mountain, Michigan) is an American former ski jumper who competed in the Olympic Winter Games in Calgary Canada (1988) and Albertville France (1992). Konopacke holds two national titles in ski jumping (1988, Ishpemping MI; and 1991, Steamboat Springs CO—tied with Jim Holland).
