= Masaru Nagaoka =

Japanese ski jumper

Personal information
- Nationality: Japanese
- Born: 6 August 1962 (age 62); Hokkaido, Japan

Sport
- Sport: Ski jumping

Masaru Nagaoka (長岡 勝, Nagaoka Masaru, born 6 August 1962) is a Japanese ski jumper. He competed at the 1984 Winter Olympics and the 1988 Winter Olympics.
