= Jan Boklöv =

Swedish ski jumper (born 1966)

Personal information
- Full name: Jan Mauritz Boklöv
- Born: 14 April 1966 (age 60) Koskullskulle, Gällivare, Sweden
- Height: 1.68 m (5 ft 6 in)

Sport
- Sport: Skiing

World Cup career
- Seasons: 1985–1993
- Indiv. podiums: 11
- Indiv. wins: 5
- Overall titles: 1 (1989)
- Updated on 23 June 2015

Jan Mauritz Boklöv (born 14 April 1966) is a Swedish former ski jumper who won the 1988–89 World Cup season. He also dominated the Swedish national championships during the late 1980s and early 1990s. He is best known for popularising the now-ubiquitous V-style in the late 1980s and early 1990s.

Kurt Elimä was one of Boklöv's trainers. Boklöv competed in two Winter Olympics, finishing seventh in the team large hill event in Calgary in 1988 and 47th in the individual normal hill in Albertville in 1992. At the 1989 Ski Jumping World Championships in Lahti, he finished fifth in the team large hill and tenth in the individual normal hill events. At the 1990 Ski Flying World Championships in Vikersund, Boklöv finished 27th.

In 1989 he was the recipient of the Jerringpriset, a prize for the best sports performance of the year by a Swedish athlete, as voted for by the radio audience of Radiosporten.

During the early 2000s he lived in Luxembourg.

== World Cup competition victories ==
Date	Location	Hill type
10 December 1988	Lake Placid, New York, United States	Large hill
18 December 1988	Sapporo, Japan	Large hill
4 January 1989	Innsbruck, Tyrol, Austria	Large hill
15 January 1989	Harrachov, Czech SR, Czechoslovakia	Ski flying hill
28 January 1989	Chamonix, France	Normal hill

== Swedish national champion ==
- Normal hill (K70): 1985, 1986, 1987, 1989
- Large hill (K90): 1986, 1988, 1989, 1990
