= Josef Heumann =

German ski jumper

Josef Heumann (born 14 October 1964) was a West German-German ski jumper who competed from 1981 to 1992. He finished sixth in the team large hill event at the 1988 Winter Olympics in Calgary.

Heumann finished 23rd in the individual large hill event at the 1989 FIS Nordic World Ski Championships in Lahti. He finished 18th in the 1990 Ski-flying World Championships in Vikersund.

Heumann's best individual world Cup career finish was second in a normal hill event in West Germany in 1989.
