= Ladislav Dluhoš =

Czech ski jumper

Medal record

Men's ski jumping

Representing Czechoslovakia

World Championships
Bronze medal – third place	1984 Engelberg	Team large hill
Bronze medal – third place	1989 Lahti	Team large hill

Ladislav Dluhoš (born 6 October 1965 in Čeladná) is a Czech former ski jumper who competed for Czechoslovakia and later the Czech Republic from 1984 to 1995. He earned two bronze medals in the Team large hill event at the FIS Nordic World Ski Championships (1984, 1989), and earned his best individual finish of 6th in the individual large hill in 1989.

Dluhoš's best finish at the Winter Olympics was 4th in the team large hill at Calgary in 1988. He also finished 4th in the 1986 Ski-flying World Championships.

Dluhoš's best individual career finish was 2nd three times (1985, 1986, 1990).
