= Gérard Balanche =

Swiss ski jumper

Personal information
- Born: January 18, 1964 (age 62) Switzerland

Sport
- Sport: Skiing

Gérard Balanche (born 18 January 1964) is a Swiss ski jumper who competed from 1985 to 1989. He finished eighth in the team large hill event at the 1988 Winter Olympics in Calgary. Balanche finished 34th in the individual normal hill event at the 1989 FIS Nordic World Ski Championships in Lahti. His best World Cup career finish was third in a large hill event in Norway in 1985.
