= Thomas Klauser =

German ski jumper

Thomas Klauser (born 9 June 1964 in Reit im Winkl) was a West German-German ski jumper who competed from 1979 to 1991. At the 1988 Winter Olympics in Calgary, he finished fourth in the individual large hill and sixth in the team large hill events.

Klauser's best finish at the FIS Nordic World Ski Championships was fifth in the individual large hill at Oberstdorf in 1987. His best finish at the Ski-flying World Championships was sixth at Bad Mitterndorf in 1986.

Klauser's best World Cup career finish was second twice in 1986.
