= Canada Olympic Park =

Sports venue in Calgary, Canada

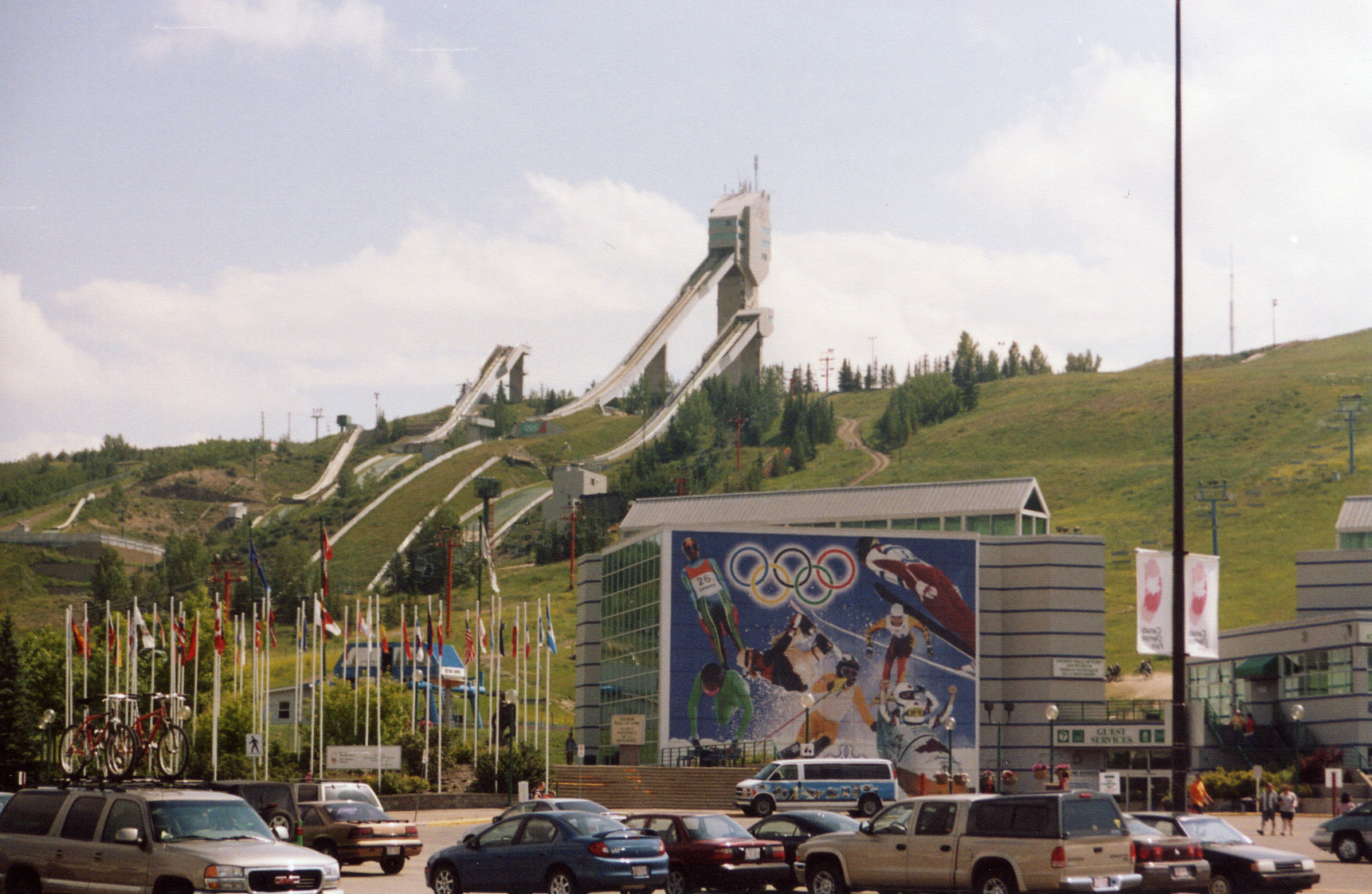
- Canada Olympic Park, Summer 2005
- Interactive map of Canada Olympic Park
- Location: Calgary, Alberta, Canada
- Coordinates: 51°04′47″N 114°12′57″W
- Top elevation: 1,250 m (4,100 ft)
- Base elevation: 1,130 m (3,710 ft)
- Skiable area: 0.4 km^{2} (0.15 sq mi)
- Trails: 3; 25% - Easy; 55% - Intermediate; 20% - Terrain Park
- Longest run: 639 m (2,096 ft)
- Lift system: 4 chairlifts, 4 magic carpet
- Snowfall: 1.14 m (3.7 ft) /year
- Website: WinSport

Canada Olympic Park (COP), formerly known as Paskapoo Ski Hill, is a ski hill and multi-purpose training and competition facility located in Calgary, Alberta, Canada, owned and operated by WinSport. It is currently used both for high performance athletic training and for recreational purposes by the general public. Canada Olympic Park was one of the venues for the 1988 Winter Olympics, being the primary venue for ski jumping, bobsleigh, and luge.

The park is located in western Calgary, south of the Trans-Canada Highway, north of the community of Cougar Ridge, west of Bowness and east of Valley Ridge.

== 1988 Winter Olympics ==
The ski resort is one of the best-known legacies of the XV Olympic Winter Games which were held in Calgary in 1988. It was the main venue for bobsleigh, luge (both at the now bobsleigh, luge, and skeleton track), Nordic combined, ski jumping, freestyle skiing (aerials and ballet).

== Activities and facilities ==
In the winter, the park is also used for winter activities including downhill skiing, snowboarding, cross-country skiing, ski jumping, bobsleigh and luge. In the summer, the park is used for warm-weather activities including mountain biking, summer festivals, ski jumping training, zip-lining and summer camps. The park also has a number of indoor facilities which are operated year-round, including arenas, fitness centres, and an indoor ice track.

The complex of buildings on the site was designed by Cook, Culham, Montgomery, Pedersen & Valentine.

=== Skiing and Snowboarding ===
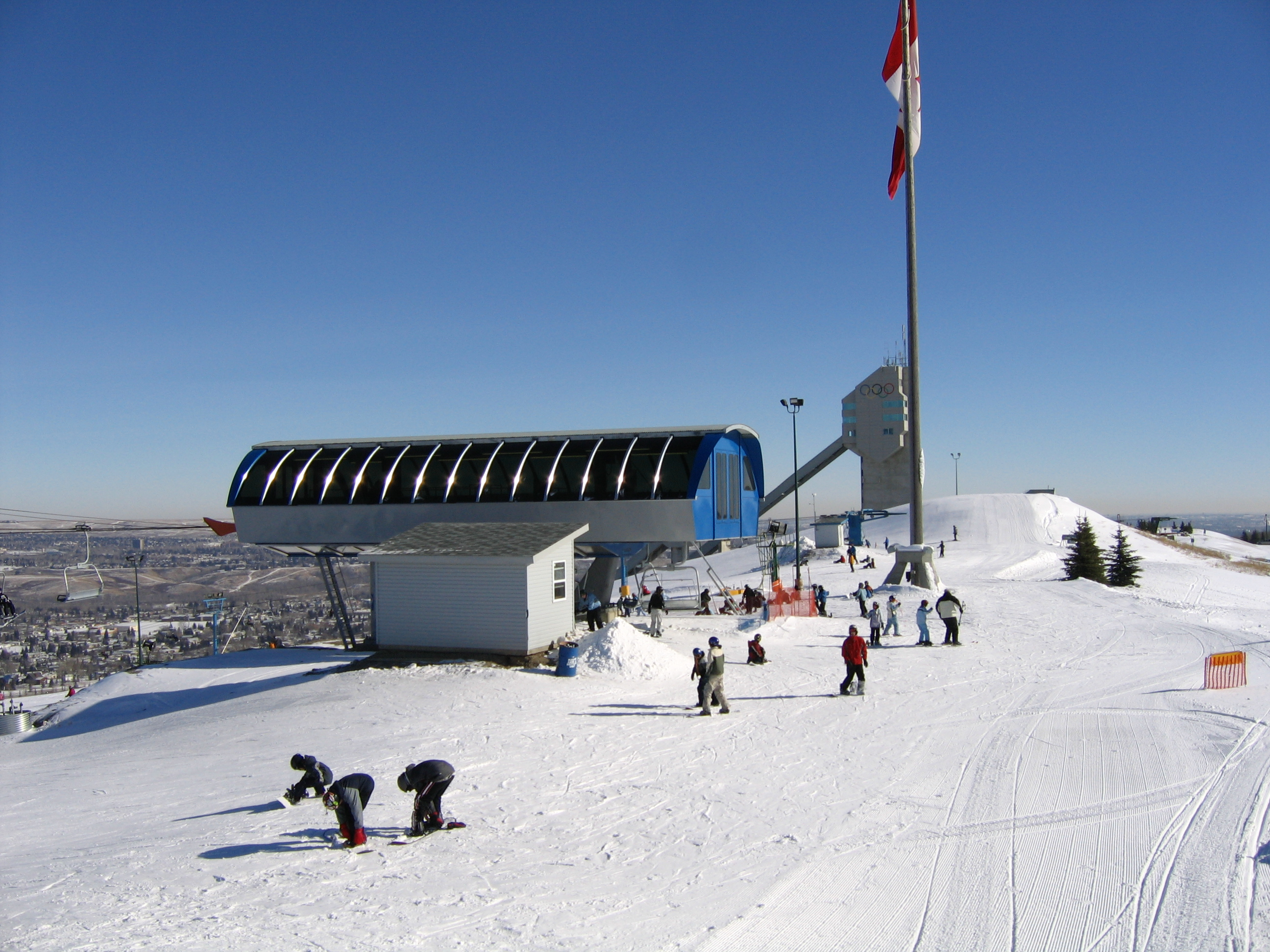
Canada Olympic Park

Canada Olympic Park is a popular place for people looking to go skiing or snowboarding without driving out to the mountains. The hill is divided into three sections, the downhill racing section, the casual section and the terrain park.

The terrain park is of exceptional quality, and as of 2006, the halfpipe has been enlarged to be an exact replica of the halfpipe that was used for the 2010 Winter Olympics in Vancouver. Other features of the terrain park include spines, handrail, and tables.

There are currently six lifts that are being used on a regular basis, two four-passenger detachable high-speed chairlift, one four person fixed grip quad, and four Magic Carpets. There is also a single chair that provides access to one of the smaller ski jumps, and a double chair (which has been removed), that takes people from the base area to near the base of the 90 m ski jump tower.

=== Snowmaking ===
Canada Olympic Park relies almost exclusively on man made snow to create skiable terrain. Snowmaking usually begins in early November and depending on weather conditions usually ends in early February. The hill has an arsenal of snowmaking equipment including automated SMI PoleCat fan guns, 'Mckinney' stick guns, and a handful of aging SMI Highland fan guns. An onsight pump station provides high pressure water and air to hydrants located around the hill. When pumping at capacity the park consumes roughly 850,000 L (220,000 US gal; 190,000 imp gal)/hr of water.

=== Ski jumping facility ===
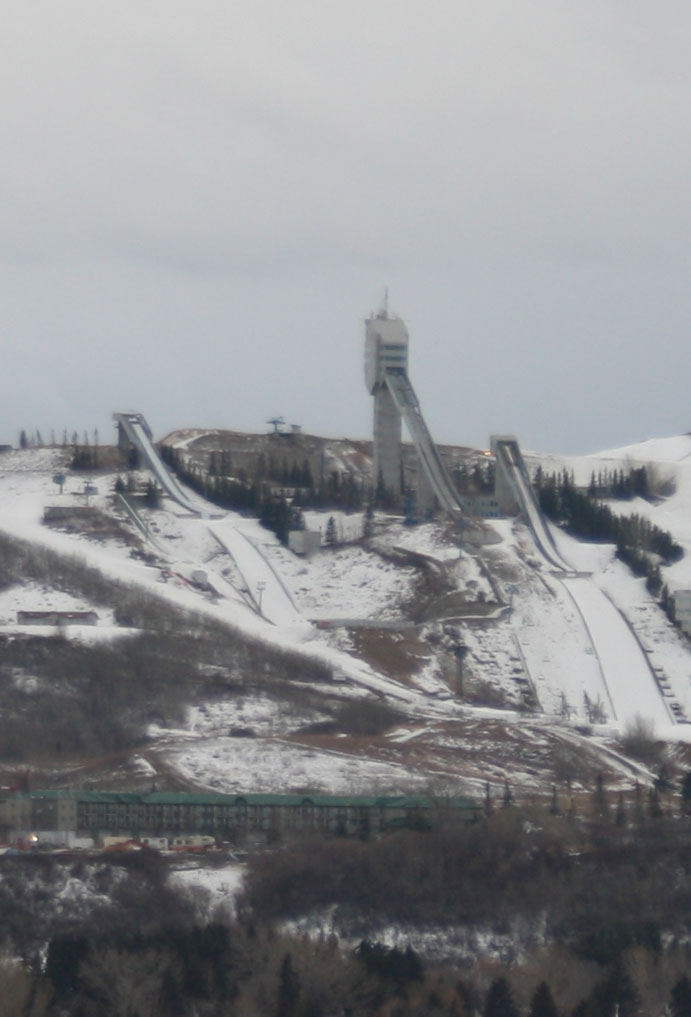
Calgary Olympic Park Ski Jumping facility in February

Winsport formerly operated a ski jumping facility, commonly known as the Alberta Ski Jump Area, on the east side of the Canada Olympic Park campus. The facility had six jumps ranging in size from K4 to K114. Of the six jumps at Canada Olympic Park, three were used year-round (the K18, K38, and K63), while the K4 and the K89 were used exclusively in the summer months. The largest jump, the K114, was no longer used for ski jumping prior to decommissioning. The facility was home to the Altius Nordic Ski Club until its closure in 2018 due to high maintenance costs exceeding $400,000 annually and lack of external funding support. In 2024, WinSport announced the full decommissioning of the ski jumps to focus on sustainable programming and growth sports, with the 90-metre tower retained for ziplining and other uses. Following the closure, the Altius Nordic Ski Club and Ski Jumping Canada have relied on temporary portable jumps and training at other sites like Whistler, highlighting the loss of Canada's only mid-sized K63 jump essential for athlete development. No permanent replacement facility has been established in Calgary as of November 2025.

=== Mountain Biking ===
In the summer Canada Olympic Park is open for the sport of mountain biking. The high-speed chairlift is used with bike racks on the chairs. There are numerous trails on the hill's west side, complete with north shore ladder stunts and singletrack trails. The east trees just contain regular trails, with minimal stunts and jumps. COP is also outfitted with a downhill course that held competitions through the summer, although this is no longer active. The trails are designed for all riding abilities. Canada Olympic Park also has a large dirt jump park and trials park. Summer sports camps run all summer with activities ranging from luge to ski jumping.

=== WinSport Arenas ===
In 2011, WinSport opened its ice facility that houses four ice rinks (an international ice size arena seating 3,000, three NHL-size rinks (the Joan Snyder arena, Arena C & the visitcalgary.com arena). The arenas have been used for curling, figure skating, power skating (for long and short track speed skating), ringette, and hockey. Also, the arena has hosted concerts, shows, and other sporting events.

During the summer of 2013, Hockey Canada held its Olympic orientation camp for prospective Canadian NHL athletes heading to the XXII Olympic Winter Games in Sochi. Due to injury concerns and insurance disputes, drills and scrimmage sessions were held off ice in a "street hockey/ball hockey" format.

WinSport Arena rinks were used for the 2023 World Ringette Championships.

=== Markin MacPhail Centre ===
In 2014, WinSport completed the Markin MacPhail Centre. The centre is named after its benefactors Allan Markin and Keith MacPhail. The high-performance centre was designed as a training hub for Canadian athletes who have reached a provincial level of excellence. The center includes the ice arenas, a gymnasium, medical center for treatment and recovery, and an office tower whose residences include the National Sport School as well as several national sport federations.

=== CEBL & Calgary Surge ===
The Calgary Surge, a professional Canadian basketball team, competes in the Canadian Elite Basketball League (CEBL). Since their inaugural season in 2022, the team has held their home games at the Canadian Olympic Park (COP).

== Canada's Sports Hall of Fame ==
On October 28, 2008, Calgary was chosen, among nine Canadian cities, to permanently host Canada's Sports Hall of Fame (CSHOF). The foundation and construction of the new facility was laid on donated land by the former Calgary Olympic Development Association (CODA), now called the Canadian Winter Sport Institute or WinSport Canada. The cost of the project was C$50 million (about C$30 million was used to build the venue; another C$20 million for operating costs, through an endowment fund). It was opened to the general public on July 1, 2011, to coincide with the Canada Day festivities. The former Olympic Museum and Hall of Fame location was turned into a training site for athletes, making it (OMHoF) redundant and the CSHOF the only sports-related museum there.

== Climate ==
Canada Olympic Park, much like the rest of the city of Calgary, experiences a dry monsoon-influenced humid continental climate (Koppen: Dwb), bordering very closely on a cold semi-arid climate (Koppen: BSk). It has warm summers and cold (but variable and occasionally mild), arid winters.

Climate data for Calgary Olympic Park (Canada Olympic Park) coordinates 51°04′47″N 114°12′57″W; elevation: 1,190 m (3,900 ft); normals 1995-2024
Month	Jan	Feb	Mar	Apr	May	Jun	Jul	Aug	Sep	Oct	Nov	Dec	Year
Record high humidex	0	0	0	—	28	37	41	47	37	—	28	0	47
Record high °C (°F)	19.9 (67.8)	20.7 (69.3)	23.6 (74.5)	27.6 (81.7)	30.5 (86.9)	36.2 (97.2)	36.0 (96.8)	34.5 (94.1)	32.8 (91.0)	26.6 (79.9)	21.3 (70.3)	17.6 (63.7)	36.2 (97.2)
Mean maximum °C (°F)	11.2 (52.2)	10.9 (51.6)	15.3 (59.5)	21.9 (71.4)	26.0 (78.8)	27.4 (81.3)	31.1 (88.0)	31.2 (88.2)	27.9 (82.2)	21.7 (71.1)	15.3 (59.5)	10.1 (50.2)	32.1 (89.8)
Mean daily maximum °C (°F)	−0.8 (30.6)	−0.3 (31.5)	3.8 (38.8)	10.2 (50.4)	16.0 (60.8)	19.4 (66.9)	23.5 (74.3)	22.9 (73.2)	17.9 (64.2)	10.7 (51.3)	3.4 (38.1)	−1.3 (29.7)	10.5 (50.9)
Daily mean °C (°F)	−5.5 (22.1)	−5.3 (22.5)	−1.7 (28.9)	4.4 (39.9)	9.8 (49.6)	13.5 (56.3)	17.0 (62.6)	16.3 (61.3)	11.7 (53.1)	5.3 (41.5)	−1.4 (29.5)	−5.8 (21.6)	5.0 (41.0)
Mean daily minimum °C (°F)	−10.2 (13.6)	−10.2 (13.6)	−7.1 (19.2)	−1.5 (29.3)	3.6 (38.5)	7.6 (45.7)	10.4 (50.7)	9.6 (49.3)	5.5 (41.9)	−0.1 (31.8)	−6.1 (21.0)	−10.3 (13.5)	−0.6 (30.9)
Mean minimum °C (°F)	−25.6 (−14.1)	−21.6 (−6.9)	−20.5 (−4.9)	−9.6 (14.7)	−3.1 (26.4)	2.4 (36.3)	5.5 (41.9)	3.7 (38.7)	−1.7 (28.9)	−9.8 (14.4)	−18.2 (−0.8)	−23.3 (−9.9)	−30.6 (−23.1)
Record low °C (°F)	−40.0 (−40.0)	−32.6 (−26.7)	−32.2 (−26.0)	−19.2 (−2.6)	−8.3 (17.1)	−1.5 (29.3)	1.3 (34.3)	0.9 (33.6)	−8.0 (17.6)	−19.1 (−2.4)	−31.4 (−24.5)	−35.0 (−31.0)	−40.0 (−40.0)
Record low wind chill	−50	−44	−39	−28	−18	−4	0	0	−13	−26	−40	−46	−50
Average precipitation mm (inches)	8.0 (0.31)	9.2 (0.36)	13.7 (0.54)	28.8 (1.13)	56.7 (2.23)	99.4 (3.91)	49.2 (1.94)	44.3 (1.74)	33.0 (1.30)	17.5 (0.69)	12.4 (0.49)	10.5 (0.41)	382.7 (15.05)
Average dew point °C (°F)	−12.6 (9.3)	−11.7 (10.9)	−9.2 (15.4)	−5.1 (22.8)	−0.1 (31.8)	5.4 (41.7)	8.5 (47.3)	7.2 (45.0)	2.8 (37.0)	−3.2 (26.2)	−8.4 (16.9)	−12.3 (9.9)	−3.2 (26.2)
Source: weatherstats.ca

== Expansion plans ==
On June 11, 2012, City Hall councillors voted against WinSport Canada's multimillion-dollar proposal to have some land at COP's base made into a "sprawling retail centre" by a vote of 9–5. However, WinSport has an option of redeveloping the land into smaller projects, over time, which can be "sustainable."

== See also ==
- List of ski areas and resorts in Canada
