= Alpine skiing at the 1988 Winter Olympics – Women's giant slalom =

Women's giant slalom at the XV Olympic Winter Games
- Alpine skiing
- Venue: Nakiska
- Date: February 24, 1988
- Competitors: 64 from 26 nations
- Winning time: 2:06.49

Medalists
1st place, gold medalist(s)		Vreni Schneider	Switzerland
2nd place, silver medalist(s)		Christa Kinshofer	West Germany
3rd place, bronze medalist(s)		Maria Walliser	Switzerland

The Women's giant slalom competition of the Calgary 1988 Olympics was held at Nakiska.

The defending world champion was Vreni Schneider of Switzerland, who shared the 1987 World Cup giant slalom title with countrywoman Maria Walliser, and was leader of the 1988 World Cup.

== Results ==
Rank	Name	Country	Run 1	Run 2	Total	Difference
1st place, gold medalist(s)	Vreni Schneider	Switzerland	1:00.53	1:05.96	2:06.49	-
2nd place, silver medalist(s)	Christa Kinshofer	West Germany	0:59.98	1:07.44	2:07.42	+0.93
3rd place, bronze medalist(s)	Maria Walliser	Switzerland	1:00.57	1:07.15	2:07.72	+1.23
4	Mateja Svet	Yugoslavia	1:00.95	1:06.85	2:07.80	+1.31
5	Christina Meier-Höck	West Germany	1:00.43	1:07.45	2:07.88	+1.39
6	Ulrike Maier	Austria	1:01.41	1:06.69	2:08.10	+1.61
7	Anita Wachter	Austria	1:00.23	1:08.15	2:08.38	+1.89
8	Catherine Quittet	France	1:01.11	1:07.73	2:08.84	+2.35
9	Carole Merle	France	1:01.30	1:08.06	2:09.36	+2.87
10	Christelle Guignard	France	1:00.90	1:08.56	2:09.46	+2.97
11	Josée Lacasse	Canada	1:01.12	1:08.66	2:09.78	+3.29
12	Diann Roffe	United States	1:01.75	1:08.94	2:10.69	+4.20
13	Debbie Armstrong	United States	1:01.73	1:08.99	2:10.72	+4.23
14	Petra Kronberger	Austria	1:02.41	1:09.90	2:12.31	+5.82
15	Katra Zajc	Yugoslavia	1:02.87	1:09.61	2:12.48	+5.99
16	Katarzyna Szafrańska	Poland	1:03.33	1:09.50	2:12.83	+6.34
17	Kerrin Lee	Canada	1:02.71	1:10.61	2:13.32	+6.83
18	Mojca Dežman	Yugoslavia	1:04.12	1:10.24	2:14.36	+7.87
19	Małgorzata Tłalka-Mogore	France	1:03.01	1:11.38	2:14.39	+7.90
20	Lucia Medzihradská	Czechoslovakia	1:03.79	1:10.64	2:14.43	+7.94
21	Jacqueline Vogt	Liechtenstein	1:03.95	1:10.69	2:14.64	+8.15
22	Kristina Andersson	Sweden	1:04.01	1:11.08	2:15.09	+8.60
23	Lenka Kebrlová	Czechoslovakia	1:04.09	1:11.08	2:15.17	+8.68
24	Carolina Birkner	Argentina	1:06.46	1:14.30	2:20.76	+14.27
25	Carolina Eiras	Argentina	1:07.92	1:14.16	2:22.08	+15.59
26	Sandra Grau	Andorra	1:10.01	1:19.22	2:29.23	+22.74
27	Karolina Fotiadou	Cyprus	1:19.02	1:25.56	2:44.58	+38.09
28	Seba Johnson	Virgin Islands	1:19.27	1:29.94	2:49.21	+42.72
29	Fiamma Smith	Guatemala	1:25.31	1:34.86	3:00.17	+53.68
-	Blanca Fernández Ochoa	Spain	0:59.68	DNF	-	-
-	Corinne Schmidhauser	Switzerland	1:00.67	DNF	-	-
-	Michaela Gerg-Leitner	West Germany	1:00.81	DNF	-	-
-	Camilla Nilsson	Sweden	1:00.96	DNF	-	-
-	Paola Magoni-Sforza	Italy	1:01.65	DNF	-	-
-	Emi Kawabata	Japan	1:02.10	DNF	-	-
-	Heidi Voelker	United States	1:02.10	DNF	-	-
-	Marina Kiehl	West Germany	1:02.11	DNF	-	-
-	Michela Figini	Switzerland	1:02.35	DNF	-	-
-	Veronika Šarec	Yugoslavia	1:02.73	DNF	-	-
-	Catharina Glassér-Bjerner	Sweden	1:03.17	DNF	-	-
-	Kate Rattray	New Zealand	1:04.10	DNF	-	-
-	Claudina Rossel	Andorra	1:06.16	DNF	-	-
-	Ingrid Grant	Great Britain	1:06.52	DNF	-	-
-	Thomai Lefousi	Greece	1:10.26	DNF	-	-
-	Astrid Steverlynck	Argentina	1:10.63	DNF	-	-
-	Sigrid Wolf	Austria	DNF	-	-	-
-	Tamara McKinney	United States	DNF	-	-	-
-	Jolanda Kindle	Liechtenstein	DNF	-	-	-
-	Monika Äijä	Sweden	DNF	-	-	-
-	Karen Percy	Canada	DNF	-	-	-
-	Ludmila Milanová	Czechoslovakia	DNF	-	-	-
-	Michelle McKendry-Ruthven	Canada	DNF	-	-	-
-	Sachiko Yamamoto	Japan	DNF	-	-	-
-	Ainhoa Ibarra Astellara	Spain	DNF	-	-	-
-	Eva Moga	Spain	DNF	-	-	-
-	Nina Ehrnrooth	Finland	DNF	-	-	-
-	Lesley Beck	Great Britain	DNF	-	-	-
-	Sarah Lewis	Great Britain	DNF	-	-	-
-	Mihaela Fera	Romania	DNF	-	-	-
-	Guðrún Kristjánsdóttir	Iceland	DNF	-	-	-
-	Magdalena Birkner	Argentina	DNF	-	-	-
-	Nadia Bonfini	Italy	DQ	-	-	-
-	Wendy Lumby	Great Britain	DQ	-	-	-
-	Mary Pat Wilson	Puerto Rico	DQ	-	-	-
