= Alpine skiing at the 1988 Winter Olympics – Women's slalom =

Women's slalom at the XV Olympic Winter Games
- Alpine skiing
- Venue: Nakiska
- Date: February 26, 1988
- Competitors: 57 from 37 nations
- Winning time: 1:36.69

Medalists
1st place, gold medalist(s)		Vreni Schneider	Switzerland
2nd place, silver medalist(s)		Mateja Svet	Yugoslavia
3rd place, bronze medalist(s)		Christa Kinshofer	West Germany

The Women's slalom competition of the Calgary 1988 Olympics was held at Nakiska.

The defending world champion was Erika Hess of Switzerland, while Switzerland's Corinne Schmidhauser was the defending World Cup slalom champion and Switzerland's Vreni Schneider the leader of the 1988 World Cup.

== Results ==
Rank	Name	Country	Run 1	Run 2	Total	Difference
1st place, gold medalist(s)	Vreni Schneider	Switzerland	0:48.81	0:47.88	1:36.69	-
2nd place, silver medalist(s)	Mateja Svet	Yugoslavia	0:49.21	0:49.16	1:38.37	+1.68
3rd place, bronze medalist(s)	Christa Kinshofer	West Germany	0:49.84	0:48.56	1:38.40	+1.71
4	Roswitha Steiner	Austria	0:50.43	0:48.34	1:38.77	+2.08
5	Blanca Fernández Ochoa	Spain	0:49.89	0:49.55	1:39.44	+2.75
6	Ida Ladstätter	Austria	0:49.71	0:49.88	1:39.59	+2.90
7	Paola Magoni	Italy	0:50.42	0:49.34	1:39.76	+3.07
8	Dorota Tłalka-Mogore	France	0:50.28	0:49.58	1:39.86	+3.17
9	Mojca Dežman	Yugoslavia	0:50.86	0:49.35	1:40.21	+3.52
10	Ulrike Maier	Austria	0:50.94	0:49.60	1:40.54	+3.85
11	Beth Madsen	United States	0:51.09	0:50.09	1:41.18	+4.49
12	Lenka Kebrlová	Czechoslovakia	0:51.01	0:51.11	1:42.12	+5.43
13	Lucia Medzihradská	Czechoslovakia	0:51.08	0:51.10	1:42.18	+5.49
14	Patricia Chauvet	France	0:51.48	0:51.31	1:42.79	+6.10
15	Diann Roffe	United States	0:51.74	0:51.14	1:42.88	+6.19
16	Josée Lacasse	Canada	0:51.63	0:51.51	1:43.14	+6.45
17	Katarzyna Szafrańska	Poland	0:52.15	0:52.06	1:44.21	+7.52
18	Michelle McKendry-Ruthven	Canada	0:53.16	0:52.63	1:45.79	+9.10
19	Emi Kawabata	Japan	0:54.70	0:54.65	1:49.35	+12.66
20	Carolina Eiras	Argentina	0:57.17	0:55.56	1:52.73	+16.04
21	Kate Rattray	New Zealand	0:56.79	0:56.15	1:52.94	+16.25
22	Carolina Birkner	Argentina	0:59.57	0:58.15	1:57.72	+21.03
23	Sandra Grau	Andorra	1:00.09	0:58.35	1:58.44	+21.75
24	Astrid Steverlynck	Argentina	1:03.06	1:01.96	2:05.02	+28.33
25	Thomai Lefousi	Greece	1:02.82	1:04.19	2:07.01	+30.32
26	Karolina Fotiadou	Cyprus	1:07.36	1:07.56	2:14.92	+38.23
27	Fiamma Smith	Guatemala	1:23.56	1:21.94	2:45.50	+68.81
28	Shailaja Kumar	India	1:26.98	1:25.29	2:52.27	+75.58
-	Camilla Nilsson	Sweden	0:48.82	DNF	-	-
-	Brigitte Oertli	Switzerland	0:49.95	DNF	-	-
-	Catharina Glassér-Bjerner	Sweden	0:50.88	DNF	-	-
-	Katra Zajc	Yugoslavia	0:51.06	DNF	-	-
-	Pascaline Freiher	France	0:51.37	DNF	-	-
-	Lesley Beck	Great Britain	0:51.70	DNF	-	-
-	Nadia Bonfini	Italy	0:51.95	DNF	-	-
-	Jolanda Kindle	Liechtenstein	0:52.56	DQ	-	-
-	Eva Moga	Spain	0:52.79	DNF	-	-
-	Ludmila Milanová	Czechoslovakia	0:53.93	DNF	-	-
-	Jacqueline Vogt	Liechtenstein	0:53.94	DNF	-	-
-	Mihaela Fera	Romania	0:58.35	DNF	-	-
-	Tamara McKinney	United States	DNF	-	-	-
-	Anita Wachter	Austria	DNF	-	-	-
-	Christelle Guignard	France	DNF	-	-	-
-	Corinne Schmidhauser	Switzerland	DNF	-	-	-
-	Veronika Šarec	Yugoslavia	DNF	-	-	-
-	Monika Äijä	Sweden	DNF	-	-	-
-	Kristina Andersson	Sweden	DNF	-	-	-
-	Anette Gersch	West Germany	DNF	-	-	-
-	Heidi Voelker	United States	DNF	-	-	-
-	Karen Percy	Canada	DNF	-	-	-
-	Nina Ehrnrooth	Finland	DNF	-	-	-
-	Sarah Lewis	Great Britain	DNF	-	-	-
-	Kirstin Cairns	Great Britain	DNF	-	-	-
-	Sachiko Yamamoto	Japan	DNF	-	-	-
-	Mary Pat Wilson	Puerto Rico	DNF	-	-	-
-	Kerrin Lee-Gartner	Canada	DQ	-	-	-
-	Magdalena Birkner	Argentina	DQ	-	-	-
