= Alpine skiing at the 1988 Winter Olympics – Women's super-G =

Women's Super G at the XV Olympic Winter Games
- Alpine skiing
- Venue: Nakiska
- Date: February 22, 1988
- Competitors: 46 from 20 nations
- Winning time: 1:19.03

Medalists
1st place, gold medalist(s)		Sigrid Wolf	Austria
2nd place, silver medalist(s)		Michela Figini	Switzerland
3rd place, bronze medalist(s)		Karen Percy	Canada

Women's downhill
- Location: Nakiska
- Vertical: 507 m (1,663 ft)
- Top elevation: 2,039 m (6,690 ft)
- Base elevation: 1,532 m (5,026 ft)

The Women's Super G competition of the Calgary 1988 Olympics was held at Nakiska on Monday, February 22. This was the Olympic debut of the event.

The defending world champion was Maria Walliser of Switzerland, who was also the defending World Cup Super G champion, while Michela Figini led the current season.

Austria's Sigrid Wolf won the gold medal, Figini took the silver, and Karen Percy of Canada was the bronze medalist; Walliser was sixth.

The course started at an elevation of 2,039 m (6,690 ft) above sea level with a vertical drop of 507 m (1,663 ft) and a course length of 1.943 km (1.21 mi). Wolf's winning time was 79.03 seconds, yielding an average speed of 88.508 km/h (55.0 mph), with an average vertical descent rate of 6.145 m/s (20.2 ft/s).

== Results ==
The race was started at 11:37 local time, (UTC −7). At the starting gate, the skies were clear, the temperature was −4 °C (25 °F), and the snow condition was hard; the temperature at the finish was −3 °C (27 °F).

Rank	Bib	Name	Country	Time	Difference
1st place, gold medalist(s)	12	Sigrid Wolf	Austria	1:19.03	—
2nd place, silver medalist(s)	5	Michela Figini	Switzerland	1:20.03	+1.00
3rd place, bronze medalist(s)	15	Karen Percy	Canada	1:20.29	+1.26
4	3	Regine Mösenlechner	West Germany	1:20.33	+1.30
5	11	Anita Wachter	Austria	1:20.36	+1.33
6	6	Maria Walliser	Switzerland	1:20.48	+1.45
7	18	Michaela Marzola	Italy	1:20.91	+1.88
7	14	Zoë Haas	Switzerland	1:20.91	+1.88
9	7	Edith Thys	United States	1:20.93	+1.90
10	16	Christa Kinshofer-Güthlein	West Germany	1:20.98	+1.95
10	4	Michaela Gerg	West Germany	1:20.98	+1.95
12	21	Carole Merle	France	1:21.01	+1.98
13	22	Laurie Graham	Canada	1:21.11	+2.08
13	13	Marina Kiehl	West Germany	1:21.11	+2.08
15	17	Elisabeth Kirchler	Austria	1:21.16	+2.13
16	2	Catherine Quittet	France	1:21.48	+2.45
17	10	Brigitte Oertli	Switzerland	1:21.56	+2.53
18	19	Debbie Armstrong	United States	1:21.87	+2.84
19	35	Lucie Laroche	Canada	1:21.95	+2.92
20	8	Mateja Svet	Yugoslavia	1:21.96	+2.93
21	9	Blanca Fernández Ochoa	Spain	1:22.04	+3.01
22	23	Claudine Emonet	France	1:22.05	+3.02
23	20	Kerrin Lee	Canada	1:22.11	+3.08
24	29	Emi Kawabata	Japan	1:22.24	+3.21
25	1	Sylvia Eder	Austria	1:22.39	+3.36
26	25	Hilary Lindh	United States	1:23.11	+4.08
27	32	Veronika Šarec	Yugoslavia	1:23.17	+4.14
28	38	Kate Rattray	New Zealand	1:23.48	+4.45
29	26	Ludmila Milanová	Czechoslovakia	1:23.92	+4.89
30	34	Sachiko Yamamoto	Japan	1:24.32	+5.29
31	30	Wendy Lumby	Great Britain	1:24.36	+5.33
32	27	Kristin Krone	United States	1:24.51	+5.48
33	33	Ainhoa Ibarra Astellara	Spain	1:24.70	+5.67
34	41	Mihaela Fera	Romania	1:25.55	+6.52
35	36	Clare Booth	Great Britain	1:26.27	+7.24
36	43	Carolina Birkner	Argentina	1:28.42	+9.39
37	39	Carolina Eiras	Argentina	1:29.87	+10.84
38	40	Claudina Rossel	Andorra	1:30.78	+11.75
39	44	Mariela Vallecillo	Argentina	1:33.49	+14.46
40	42	Sandra Grau	Andorra	1:33.65	+14.62
41	47	Astrid Steverlynck	Argentina	1:36.51	+17.48
-	45	Fiamma Smith	Guatemala	DNF	-
-	37	Jacqueline Vogt	Liechtenstein	DNF	-
-	24	Cathy Chedal	France	DNF	-
-	48	Seba Johnson	Virgin Islands	DQ	-
-	46	Thomai Lefousi	Greece	DQ	-
	31	Lenka Kebrlová	Czechoslovakia	DNS	
	28	Lucia Medzihradská	Czechoslovakia	DNS	
