= Alpine skiing at the 1988 Winter Olympics – Women's combined =

Women's combined at the XV Olympic Winter Games
- Alpine skiing
- Venue: Nakiska
- Date: February 20–21, 1988
- Competitors: 39 from 14 nations
- Winning points: 29.25

Medalists
| 1st place, gold medalist(s) | | Anita Wachter | Austria |
| 2nd place, silver medalist(s) | | Brigitte Oertli | Switzerland |
| 3rd place, bronze medalist(s) | | Maria Walliser | Switzerland |

The Women's combined competition of the Calgary 1988 Olympics was held at Nakiska.

The defending world champion was Erika Hess of Switzerland, while Switzerland's Brigitte Ortli was the defending World Cup combined champion, and led the 1988 World Cup.

== Results ==
| Rank | Name | Country | Downhill | | Slalom | | | | Total |
| Rank | Name | Country | Time | Points | Run 1 | Run 2 | Total | Points | Total |
|---|---|---|---|---|---|---|---|---|---|
| 1st place, gold medalist(s) | Anita Wachter | Austria | 1:17.14 | 10.49 | 40.68 | 42.29 | 1:22.97 | 18.76 | 29.25 |
| 2nd place, silver medalist(s) | Brigitte Oertli | Switzerland | 1:18.37 | 29.48 | 39.24 | 41.47 | 1:20.71 | 0.00 | 29.48 |
| 3rd place, bronze medalist(s) | Maria Walliser | Switzerland | 1:16.98 | 8.03 | 41.80 | 44.12 | 1:25.92 | 43.25 | 51.28 |
| 4 | Karen Percy | Canada | 1:18.22 | 27.16 | 40.62 | 43.38 | 1:24.00 | 27.31 | 54.47 |
| 5 | Lenka Kebrlová | Czechoslovakia | 1:18.43 | 30.40 | 40.91 | 43.47 | 1:24.38 | 30.47 | 60.87 |
| 6 | Lucia Medzihradská | Czechoslovakia | 1:18.62 | 33.33 | 41.62 | 42.73 | 1:24.35 | 30.22 | 63.55 |
| 7 | Michelle McKendry-Ruthven | Canada | 1:17.58 | 17.28 | 42.24 | 44.20 | 1:26.44 | 47.57 | 64.85 |
| 8 | Kerrin Lee | Canada | 1:18.15 | 26.08 | 42.23 | 43.20 | 1:25.43 | 39.18 | 65.26 |
| 9 | Ulrike Stanggassinger | West Germany | 1:17.92 | 22.53 | 42.68 | 43.93 | 1:26.61 | 48.98 | 71.51 |
| 10 | Michaela Marzola | Italy | 1:17.95 | 22.99 | 43.65 | 44.57 | 1:28.22 | 62.34 | 85.33 |
| 11 | Petra Kronberger | Austria | 1:18.36 | 29.32 | 44.53 | 43.25 | 1:27.78 | 58.69 | 88.01 |
| 12 | Sylvia Eder | Austria | 1:19.68 | 49.69 | 42.03 | 43.88 | 1:25.91 | 43.17 | 92.86 |
| 13 | Nancy Gee | Canada | 1:20.21 | 57.87 | 42.41 | 43.84 | 1:26.25 | 45.99 | 103.86 |
| 14 | Karin Dedler | West Germany | 1:18.80 | 36.11 | 43.38 | 45.65 | 1:29.03 | 69.07 | 105.18 |
| 15 | Beth Madsen | United States | 1:21.31 | 74.84 | 41.86 | 42.92 | 1:24.78 | 33.79 | 108.63 |
| 16 | Jolanda Kindle | Liechtenstein | 1:21.23 | 73.61 | 41.82 | 43.60 | 1:25.42 | 39.10 | 112.71 |
| 17 | Kristin Krone | United States | 1:18.80 | 36.11 | 44.94 | 45.25 | 1:30.19 | 78.70 | 114.81 |
| 18 | Jacqueline Vogt | Liechtenstein | 1:20.81 | 67.13 | 43.17 | 45.14 | 1:28.31 | 63.09 | 130.22 |
| 19 | Wendy Lumby | Great Britain | 1:19.86 | 52.47 | 44.59 | 46.43 | 1:31.02 | 85.59 | 138.06 |
| 20 | Sachiko Yamamoto | Japan | 1:20.33 | 59.72 | 43.66 | 46.60 | 1:30.26 | 79.28 | 139.00 |
| 21 | Mihaela Fera | Romania | 1:19.82 | 51.85 | 45.17 | 46.37 | 1:31.54 | 89.90 | 141.75 |
| 22 | Pascaline Freiher | France | 1:24.18 | 119.13 | 42.16 | 42.50 | 1:24.66 | 32.79 | 151.92 |
| 23 | Hilary Lindh | United States | 1:19.27 | 43.36 | 46.96 | 48.35 | 1:35.31 | 121.20 | 164.56 |
| 24 | Carolina Eiras | Argentina | 1:24.93 | 130.71 | 45.79 | 49.06 | 1:34.85 | 117.38 | 248.09 |
| 25 | Carolina Birkner | Argentina | 1:25.10 | 133.33 | 46.70 | 48.78 | 1:35.48 | 122.61 | 255.94 |
| 26 | Mariela Vallecillo | Argentina | 1:27.25 | 166.51 | 50.16 | 52.98 | 1:43.14 | 186.20 | 352.71 |
| - | Carole Merle | France | 1:16.46 | 0.00 | DQ | - | - | - | - |
| - | Vreni Schneider | Switzerland | 1:18.10 | 25.31 | DNF | - | - | - | - |
| - | Edith Thys | United States | 1:18.38 | 29.63 | DNF | - | - | - | - |
| - | Emi Kawabata | Japan | 1:18.53 | 31.94 | DNF | - | - | - | - |
| - | Christa Kinshofer | West Germany | 1:19.83 | 52.00 | DNF | - | - | - | - |
| - | Clare Booth | Great Britain | 1:20.58 | 63.58 | DNF | - | - | - | - |
| - | Astrid Steverlynck | Argentina | 1:26.89 | 160.95 | DNF | - | - | - | - |
| | Ulrike Maier | Austria | DNF | - | - | - | - | - | - |
| | Ludmila Milanová | Czechoslovakia | DNF | - | - | - | - | - | - |
| | Claudine Emonet | France | DNF | - | - | - | - | - | - |
| | Golnur Postnikova | Soviet Union | DNF | - | - | - | - | - | - |
| | Beatrice Gafner | Switzerland | DNF | - | - | - | - | - | - |
| | Michaela Gerg-Leitner | West Germany | DQ | - | - | - | - | - | - |
