= Birkner =

Birkner is a surname. Notable people with the surname include:

- Bautista Saubidet Birkner (born 1995), Argentine sailor
- Carolina Birkner (born 1971), Argentine skier
- Cristian Javier Simari Birkner (born 1980), Argentine skier
- Francisco Saubidet Birkner (born 1998), Argentine sailor
- Hans-Joachim Birkner (1921–1944), German Luftwaffe fighter ace
- Ignacio Birkner (born 1971), Argentine skier
- Jorge Birkner (born 1964), Argentine skier
- Jorge Birkner Ketelhohn (born 1990), Argentine skier
- Macarena Simari Birkner (born 1984), Argentine skier
- Magdalena Birkner (born 1966), Argentine skier
- María Belén Simari Birkner (born 1982), Argentine skier
- Nicola Birkner (born 1969), German sailor
- Stefan Birkner (born 1973), German politician
- Tomás Birkner de Miguel (born 1997), Argentine alpine ski racer
- Wolfgang Birkner (1913–1945), Nazi war criminal

== See also ==
- Birkner, Illinois
- Pirkner, people bearing that surname
