= Alpine skiing at the 1988 Winter Olympics – Women's downhill =

Women's downhill at the XV Olympic Winter Games
- Alpine skiing
- Venue: Nakiska
- Date: February 19, 1988
- Competitors: 35 from 14 nations
- Winning time: 1:25.86

Medalists
1st place, gold medalist(s)		Marina Kiehl	West Germany
2nd place, silver medalist(s)		Brigitte Oertli	Switzerland
3rd place, bronze medalist(s)		Karen Percy	Canada

Women's downhill
- Location: Nakiska
- Vertical: 647 m (2,123 ft)
- Top elevation: 2,179 m (7,149 ft)
- Base elevation: 1,532 m (5,026 ft)

The Women's Downhill competition of the Calgary 1988 Olympics was held at Nakiska on Friday, February 19. The race was delayed a day due to high winds on Thursday.

The defending world champion was Maria Walliser of Switzerland, while teammate Michela Figini was the defending Olympic and World Cup downhill champion and led the current season.

West Germany's Marina Kiehl won the gold medal, Brigitte Oertli of Switzerland took silver, and Karen Percy of Canada was the bronze medalist; Walliser was fourth and Figini finished ninth.

The course started at an elevation of 2,179 m (7,149 ft) above sea level with a vertical drop of 647 m (2,123 ft) and a course length of 2.238 km (1.39 mi). Kiehl's winning time was 85.86 seconds, yielding an average speed of 93.836 km/h (58.3 mph), with an average vertical descent rate of 7.536 m/s (24.7 ft/s).

== Results ==
The race was started at 10:00 local time, (UTC −7). At the starting gate, the skies were partly cloudy, the temperature was −2 °C (28 °F), and the snow condition was hard; the temperature at the finish was 4 °C (39 °F).

Rank	Bib	Name	Country	Time	Difference
1st place, gold medalist(s)	8	Marina Kiehl	West Germany	1:25.86	—
2nd place, silver medalist(s)	12	Brigitte Oertli	Switzerland	1:26.61	+0.75
3rd place, bronze medalist(s)	6	Karen Percy	Canada	1:26.62	+0.76
4	4	Maria Walliser	Switzerland	1:26.89	+1.03
5	15	Laurie Graham	Canada	1:26.99	+1.13
6	5	Petra Kronberger	Austria	1:27.03	+1.17
7	10	Regine Mösenlechner	West Germany	1:27.16	+1.30
8	14	Elisabeth Kirchler	Austria	1:27.19	+1.33
9	9	Michela Figini	Switzerland	1:27.26	+1.40
10	24	Lucia Medzihradská	Czechoslovakia	1:27.28	+1.42
11	3	Chantal Bournissen	Switzerland	1:27.46	+1.60
12	20	Carole Merle	France	1:27.53	+1.67
13	1	Michaela Gerg	West Germany	1:27.83	+1.97
14	25	Emi Kawabata	Japan	1:27.85	+1.99
15	13	Kerrin Lee	Canada	1:28.07	+2.21
16	11	Golnur Postnikova	Soviet Union	1:28.23	+2.37
17	21	Claudine Emonet	France	1:28.36	+2.50
18	19	Edith Thys	United States	1:28.53	+2.67
19	27	Michaela Marzola	Italy	1:28.69	+2.83
20	26	Kristin Krone	United States	1:29.13	+3.27
21	23	Christina Meier-Höck	West Germany	1:29.30	+3.44
22	28	Wendy Lumby	Great Britain	1:29.76	+3.90
23	30	Sachiko Yamamoto	Japan	1:30.15	+4.29
24	22	Ludmila Milanová	Czechoslovakia	1:30.42	+4.56
25	29	Clare Booth	Great Britain	1:32.50	+6.64
26	32	Jolanda Kindle	Liechtenstein	1:32.88	+7.02
27	36	Carolina Eiras	Argentina	1:37.37	+11.51
28	34	Astrid Steverlynck	Argentina	1:41.64	+15.78
-	37	Mariela Vallecillo	Argentina	DNF	-
-	35	Mihaela Fera	Romania	DNF	-
-	33	Jacqueline Vogt	Liechtenstein	DNF	-
-	18	Hilary Lindh	United States	DNF	-
-	17	Anita Wachter	Austria	DNF	-
-	7	Kellie Casey	Canada	DNF	-
-	2	Sigrid Wolf	Austria	DNF	-
-	31	Ingrid Grant	Great Britain	DNS	-
-	16	Catherine Quittet	France	DNS	-
-		Pam Fletcher	United States	DNS	-
