= Heidi Voelker =

American alpine skier (born 1969)

Heidi Voelker (born October 29, 1969) is an American former World Cup alpine ski racer who competed in three Winter Olympics (1988, 1992, 1994). She formally was the Ambassador of Skiing for Deer Valley Resort in Park City, Utah.

Born in Pittsfield, Massachusetts, Voelker began skiing at the age of two, chasing her three older siblings through the ski areas of the Berkshires in southwestern New England. Possessing a great skill for the sport, she launched into competitive skiing at a young age, earning silver in the slalom at the Junior World Championships (1987) and receiving Junior Alpine Skier of the Year award (1988).

As a twelve-year veteran of the U.S. Ski Team (1985 to 1997), Voelker has many titles as a competitive ski racer: she holds six top-ten World Cup finishes to her credit, including a podium in 1994, and competed for gold during three Winter Olympics. She was also the 1994 National Champion in giant slalom and finished her racing career with a third-place finish in giant slalom at the U.S. Nationals in 1997. Voelker moved to Utah in 1990 and formally was the Ambassador of Skiing at Deer Valley Resort.

Voelker is also featured on Utah's "ski" license plate, introduced in 2007. She is the first living human and woman to be featured on a state license plate. She is also credited with the creation of Mikaela Shiffrin's iconic 'Always be Faster Then The Boys, ABFTTB' inspirational quote and subsequent race helmet sticker; when she signed a poster with the phrase for the young Mikaela.

== World Cup results ==
=== Season standings ===
Season	Age	Overall	Slalom	Giant Slalom	Super G	Downhill	Combined
1988	18	63	27	—	—	—	—
1989	19	66	28	—	—	—	—
1990	20	67	33	36	—	—	—
1991	21	57	19	—	—	—	—
1992	22	78	30	—	—	—	—
1993	23	96	46	52	—	—	—
1994	24	30	—	7	—	—	—
1995	25	81	55	41	43	—	—

=== Top ten finishes ===
- 1 podium – (1 GS), 6 top tens

Season	Date	Location	Discipline	Place
1988	4 Mar 1988	(United States) Aspen, USA	Slalom	8th
1994	5 Dec 1993	Tignes, France	Giant slalom	5th
1994	11 Dec 1993	Veysonnaz, Switzerland	Giant slalom	9th
1994	5 Jan 1994	Morzine, France	Giant slalom	3rd
1994	16 Jan 1994	Cortina d'Ampezzo, Italy	Giant slalom	7th
1994	21 Jan 1994	Maribor, Slovenia	Giant slalom	8th

== World Championship results ==
Year	Age	Slalom	Giant Slalom	Super G	Downhill	Combined
1989	19	—	14	—	—	—
1991	21	8	—	—	—	—

- The U.S. team missed the Super-G in 1991 due to the Gulf War.

== Olympic results ==
Year	Age	Slalom	Giant Slalom	Super G	Downhill	Combined
1988	18	DNF1	DNF2	—	—	—
1992	22	20	—	—	—	—
1994	24	—	DNF2	—	—	—
