= Alpine skiing at the 1992 Winter Olympics – Women's super-G =

Women's super-G at the XVI Olympic Winter Games
- Alpine skiing
- Venue: Meribel
- Date: February 18, 1992
- Competitors: 59 from 26 nations
- Winning time: 1:21.22

Medalists
1st place, gold medalist(s)		Deborah Compagnoni	Italy
2nd place, silver medalist(s)		Carole Merle	France
3rd place, bronze medalist(s)		Katja Seizinger	Germany

Women's super-G
- Location: Meribel – Piste du Corbey
- Vertical: 498 m (1,634 ft)
- Top elevation: 1,930 m (6,332 ft)
- Base elevation: 1,432 m (4,698 ft)

The women's super-G competition of the Albertville 1992 Olympics was held at Meribel on Tuesday, 18 February.

The defending world champion was Ulrike Maier of Austria, while France's Carole Merle was the defending World Cup Super-G champion, and shared the lead in the current season with Heidi Zeller.

Deborah Compagnoni of Italy won the gold medal, Merle took the silver, and Katja Seizinger of Germany was the bronze medalist. Maier was fifth, downhill champion Kerrin Lee-Gartner was sixth, and Zeller was eleventh. The winning margin was 1.41 seconds; through 2018, it remains the largest in the event's Olympic history. On the same day at Val-d'Isère, compatriot Alberto Tomba successfully defended his men's giant slalom title.

The Piste du Corbey course started at an elevation of 1,930 m (6,332 ft) above sea level with a vertical drop of 498 m (1,634 ft) and a course length of 1.510 km (0.94 mi). Campagnoni's winning time was 81.22 seconds, yielding an average course speed of 66.929 km/h (41.6 mph), with an average vertical descent rate of 6.13 m/s (20.1 ft/s).

== Results ==
The race was started at 12:15 local time, (UTC +1). At the starting gate, the skies were clear, the temperature was −7.0 °C (19 °F), and the snow condition was hard; the temperature at the finish was at −5.0 °C (23 °F).

Rank	Name	Country	Time	Difference
1st place, gold medalist(s)	Deborah Compagnoni	Italy	1:21.22	—
2nd place, silver medalist(s)	Carole Merle	France	1:22.63	+1.41
3rd place, bronze medalist(s)	Katja Seizinger	Germany	1:23.19	+1.97
4	Petra Kronberger	Austria	1:23.20	+1.98
5	Ulrike Maier	Austria	1:23.35	+2.13
6	Kerrin Lee-Gartner	Canada	1:23.76	+2.54
7	Michaela Gerg	Germany	1:23.77	+2.55
8	Eva Twardokens	United States	1:24.19	+2.97
9	Anita Wachter	Austria	1:24.20	+2.98
10	Zoë Haas	Switzerland	1:24.31	+3.09
11	Heidi Zeller	Switzerland	1:24.51	+3.29
12	Pernilla Wiberg	Sweden	1:24.58	+3.36
13	Bibiana Perez	Italy	1:24.69	+3.47
14	Regine Mösenlechner	Germany	1:24.85	+3.63
15	Barbara Sadleder	Austria	1:24.91	+3.69
16	Barbara Merlin	Italy	1:25.13	+3.91
17	Hilary Lindh	United States	1:25.37	+4.15
18	Miriam Vogt	Germany	1:25.40	+4.18
19	Florence Masnada	France	1:25.42	+4.20
20	Michelle McKendry	Canada	1:25.43	+4.21
21	Anne Berge	Norway	1:25.65	+4.43
22	Cathy Chedal	France	1:25.66	+4.44
23	Morena Gallizio	Italy	1:26.19	+4.97
24	Varvara Zelenskaya	Unified Team	1:26.39	+5.17
25	Svetlana Gladysheva	Unified Team	1:26.51	+5.29
26	Régine Cavagnoud	France	1:26.69	+5.47
27	Lucia Medzihradská	Czechoslovakia	1:26.76	+5.54
28	Tatyana Lebedeva	Unified Team	1:26.92	+5.70
29	Ainhoa Ibarra Astellara	Spain	1:26.96	+5.74
30	Birgit Heeb	Liechtenstein	1:27.22	+6.00
31	Emi Kawabata	Japan	1:27.31	+6.09
32	Nataša Bokal	Slovenia	1:27.42	+6.20
33	Sachiko Yamamoto	Japan	1:27.54	+6.32
34	Ľudmila Milanová	Czechoslovakia	1:27.61	+6.39
35	Emma Bosch	Spain	1:28.45	+7.23
36	Valerie Scott	Great Britain	1:29.74	+8.52
37	Vicky Grau	Andorra	1:30.07	+8.85
38	Mihaela Fera	Romania	1:31.78	+10.56
39	Carolina Eiras	Argentina	1:32.33	+11.11
40	Astrid Steverlynck	Argentina	1:33.48	+12.26
41	Marina Vidović	Yugoslavia	1:34.35	+13.13
42	Thomai Lefousi	Greece	1:37.61	+16.39
43	Annamária Bónis	Hungary	1:37.68	+16.46
44	Vera Gönczi	Hungary	1:37.90	+16.68
45	Liu Yali	China	1:43.50	+22.28
46	Evelyn Schuler	Brazil	1:48.74	+27.52
47	Li Xueqin	China	1:48.86	+27.64
48	Nacera Boukamoum	Algeria	1:56.07	+34.85
-	Diann Roffe	United States	DNF	-
-	Merete Fjeldavlie	Norway	DNF	-
-	Chantal Bournissen	Switzerland	DNF	-
-	Heidi Zurbriggen	Switzerland	DNF	-
-	Astrid Lødemel	Norway	DNF	-
-	Špela Pretnar	Slovenia	DNF	-
-	Barbara Brlec	Slovenia	DNF	-
-	Debbie Pratt	Great Britain	DNF	-
-	Julie Parisien	United States	DQ	-
-	Urška Hrovat	Slovenia	DQ	-
-	Nawal Slaoui	Morocco	DQ	-
