= Edith Thys =

American alpine skier (born 1966)

Edith Olivia "Edie" Thys (born March 31, 1966, in San Leandro, California) is an American former World Cup alpine ski racer who competed in two Winter Olympics (1988, 1992). As a journalist, she served on the staffs of SKI Magazine and the Ski Racing newspaper, and is a regular contributor to Skiing History magazine.

== World Cup results ==
=== Season standings ===
| Season | Age | Overall | Slalom | Giant slalom | Super-G | Downhill | Combined |
|---|---|---|---|---|---|---|---|
| 1988 | 21 | 45 | — | — | 17 | 34 | — |
| 1989 | 22 | | | | | | |
| 1990 | 23 | 54 | — | — | 17 | — | — |
| 1991 | 24 | 39 | — | 32 | 13 | 21 | — |
| 1992 | 25 | 68 | — | — | 38 | 27 | — |
| 1993 | 26 | 85 | — | 42 | 37 | 52 | — |

=== Top ten finishes ===
- 1 podium – (1 SG), 5 top tens

| Season | Date | Location | Discipline | Place |
|---|---|---|---|---|
| 1988 | 28 Nov 1987 | Sestriere, Italy | Super-G | 7th |
| 1990 | 9 Aug 1989 | Las Leñas, Argentina | Super-G | 9th |
| 1990 | 2 Dec 1989 | (United States) Vail, USA | Super-G | 5th |
| 1991 | 24 Feb 1991 | Furano, Japan | Super-G | 2nd |
| 1991 | 16 Mar 1991 | (United States) Vail, USA | Downhill | 4th |

== World Championship results ==
| Year | Age | Slalom | Giant slalom | Super-G | Downhill | Combined |
|---|---|---|---|---|---|---|
| 1987 | 20 | — | — | — | 20 | — |
| 1989 | 22 | — | — | DNF | — | — |
| 1991 | 24 | — | — | 9 | — | — |

== Olympic results ==
| Year | Age | Slalom | Giant slalom | Super-G | Downhill | Combined |
|---|---|---|---|---|---|---|
| 1988 | 21 | — | — | 9 | 18 | DNF SL1 |
| 1992 | 25 | — | — | — | 25 | — |
