= Alpine skiing at the 1992 Winter Olympics – Women's combined =

Women's combined at the XVI Olympic Winter Games
- Alpine skiing
- Venue: Meribel
- Date: February 12–13, 1992
- Competitors: 40 from 18 nations
- Winning points: 2.55

Medalists
| 1st place, gold medalist(s) | | Petra Kronberger | Austria |
| 2nd place, silver medalist(s) | | Anita Wachter | Austria |
| 3rd place, bronze medalist(s) | | Florence Masnada | France |

The Women's combined competition of the Albertville 1992 Olympics was held at Meribel.

The defending world champion was Chantal Bournissen of Switzerland, while Austria's Sabine Ginther was the defending World Cup and 1992 World Cup combined champion.

== Results ==
| Rank | Name | Country | Downhill | | Slalom | | | | Total |
| Rank | Name | Country | Time | Points | Run 1 | Run 2 | Total | Points | Total |
|---|---|---|---|---|---|---|---|---|---|
| 1st place, gold medalist(s) | Petra Kronberger | Austria | 1:25.84 | 0.00 | 35.36 | 34.24 | 1:09.60 | 2.55 | 2.55 |
| 2nd place, silver medalist(s) | Anita Wachter | Austria | 1:27.25 | 17.58 | 34.79 | 34.72 | 1:09.51 | 1.81 | 19.39 |
| 3rd place, bronze medalist(s) | Florence Masnada | France | 1:27.08 | 15.46 | 35.19 | 34.82 | 1:10.01 | 5.92 | 21.38 |
| 4 | Chantal Bournissen | Switzerland | 1:26.92 | 13.46 | 35.33 | 35.36 | 1:10.69 | 11.52 | 24.98 |
| 5 | Anne Berge | Norway | 1:28.67 | 35.28 | 34.93 | 34.36 | 1:09.29 | 0.00 | 35.28 |
| 6 | Michelle McKendry-Ruthven | Canada | 1:27.32 | 18.45 | 35.67 | 36.12 | 1:11.79 | 20.57 | 39.02 |
| 7 | Nataša Bokal | Slovenia | 1:29.02 | 39.64 | 35.05 | 34.60 | 1:09.65 | 2.96 | 42.60 |
| 8 | Lucia Medzihradská | Czechoslovakia | 1:27.89 | 25.55 | 35.52 | 36.43 | 1:11.95 | 21.88 | 47.43 |
| 9 | Miriam Vogt | Germany | 1:27.35 | 18.82 | 36.61 | 36.29 | 1:12.90 | 29.70 | 48.52 |
| 10 | Régine Cavagnoud | France | 1:28.16 | 28.92 | 35.96 | 36.03 | 1:11.99 | 22.21 | 51.13 |
| 11 | Krista Schmidinger | United States | 1:26.36 | 6.48 | 37.66 | 37.11 | 1:14.77 | 45.08 | 51.56 |
| 12 | Svetlana Gladysheva | Unified Team | 1:26.88 | 12.96 | 38.15 | 37.01 | 1:15.16 | 48.29 | 61.25 |
| 13 | Emi Kawabata | Japan | 1:27.13 | 16.08 | 37.56 | 37.81 | 1:15.37 | 50.02 | 66.10 |
| 14 | Heidi Zeller-Bähler | Switzerland | 1:26.90 | 13.21 | 37.63 | 38.45 | 1:16.08 | 55.86 | 69.07 |
| 15 | Ľudmila Milanová | Czechoslovakia | 1:28.68 | 35.40 | 36.69 | 37.57 | 1:14.26 | 40.88 | 76.28 |
| 16 | Morena Gallizio | Italy | 1:29.84 | 49.86 | 36.94 | 37.62 | 1:14.56 | 43.35 | 93.21 |
| 17 | Emma Carrick-Anderson | Great Britain | 1:32.79 | 86.63 | 36.00 | 35.84 | 1:11.84 | 20.98 | 107.61 |
| 18 | Tetiana Lebedeva | Unified Team | 1:27.79 | 24.31 | 40.05 | 39.82 | 1:19.87 | 87.03 | 111.34 |
| 19 | Svetlana Novikova | Unified Team | 1:30.03 | 52.23 | 38.89 | 38.94 | 1:17.83 | 70.25 | 122.48 |
| 20 | Birgit Heeb-Batliner | Liechtenstein | 1:28.90 | 38.14 | 39.34 | 45.28 | 1:24.62 | 126.11 | 164.25 |
| 21 | Carolina Eiras | Argentina | 1:34.00 | 101.72 | 38.93 | 40.48 | 1:19.41 | 83.25 | 184.97 |
| 22 | Astrid Lødemel | Norway | 1:26.95 | 13.84 | 37.29 | 55.96 | 1:33.25 | 197.10 | 210.94 |
| - | Katja Seizinger | Germany | 1:26.42 | 7.23 | 36.23 | DNF | - | - | - |
| - | Kerrin Lee-Gartner | Canada | 1:26.49 | 8.10 | DQ | - | - | - | - |
| - | Michaela Gerg-Leitner | Germany | 1:27.26 | 17.70 | DQ | - | - | - | - |
| - | Regina Häusl | Germany | 1:27.95 | 26.30 | DQ | - | - | - | - |
| - | Merete Fjeldavlie | Norway | 1:28.26 | 30.17 | 35.52 | DQ | - | - | - |
| - | Ulrike Maier | Austria | 1:28.51 | 33.28 | 34.37 | DNF | - | - | - |
| - | Béatrice Filliol | France | 1:30.03 | 52.23 | 34.23 | DNF | - | - | - |
| - | Sachiko Yamamoto | Japan | 1:30.70 | 60.58 | 36.56 | DNF | - | - | - |
| - | Zali Steggall | Australia | 1:31.30 | 68.06 | DNF | - | - | - | - |
| - | Astrid Steverlynck | Argentina | 1:31.71 | 73.17 | 38.56 | DNF | - | - | - |
| - | Mihaela Fera | Romania | 1:31.74 | 73.54 | 38.00 | DNF | - | - | - |
| - | Claire De Pourtales | Great Britain | 1:32.52 | 83.27 | DNF | - | - | - | - |
| - | Valerie Scott | Great Britain | 1:34.57 | 108.82 | 36.73 | DNF | - | - | - |
| - | Marina Vidović | Yugoslavia | 1:35.82 | 124.40 | DNF | - | - | - | - |
| - | Kristin Krone | United States | DNF | - | - | - | - | - | - |
| - | Arijana Boras | Yugoslavia | DNF | - | - | - | - | - | - |
| - | Varvara Zelenskaya | Unified Team | DNF | - | - | - | - | - | - |
| - | Heidi Zurbriggen | Switzerland | DQ | - | - | - | - | - | - |
