= Tomás Birkner de Miguel =

Argentine alpine skier (born 1997)

Tomás Birkner
Personal information
- Full name: Tomás Birkner de Miguel
- Born: March 5, 1997 (age 29) Bariloche
- Height: 177 cm (5 ft 10 in)

Skiing career
- Sport: Alpine skiing ♂
- World Cup debut: 2015

Tomás Birkner de Miguel (born 5 March 1997) is an Argentine alpine ski racer. He is the nephew of Jorge Birkner, Magdalena Birkner, Ignacio Birkner, and Carolina Birkner and the cousin of Jorge Birkner Ketelhohn, Cristian Javier Simari Birkner, María Belén Simari Birkner, Macarena Simari Birkner, Bautista Saubidet Birkner, and Francisco Saubidet.

He competed at the 2015 World Championships in Beaver Creek, US, in the slalom.

He competed for Argentina at the 2022 Winter Olympics.

He competes at the collegiate level for the University of Utah.

He is now an Investment Banking Associate Director at UBS where he also acts as Chief Momentum Officer in the VC and Emerging Technology Space.
