= Blanca Fernández Ochoa =

Spanish alpine skier (1963–2019)

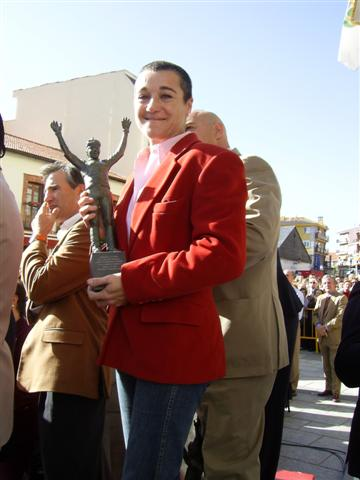
- Fernández Ochoa in October 2006

Personal information
- Born: 22 April 1963 Madrid, Spain
- Died: 24 August 2019 (aged 56) La Peñota, Cercedilla, Spain
- Height: 168 cm (5 ft 6 in)

Skiing career
- Sport: Alpine skiing
- Retired: March 1992 - (age 28)
- Disciplines: Giant slalom, slalom, combined, super-G

Olympics
- Teams: 4 – (1980, 1984, 1988, 1992)
- Medals: 1 (bronze)

World Championships
- Teams: 6 – (1980–1991)
- Medals: 0

World Cup
- Seasons: 10 – (1982–1992)
- Wins: 4 – (1 GS, 3 SL)
- Podiums: 20 – (12 GS, 8 SL)
- Overall titles: 0 – (4th in 1988)
- Discipline titles: 0 – (3rd, three times)
Medal record
Women's alpine skiing
Representing Spain
Winter Olympics
Bronze medal – third place	1992 Albertville	Slalom

Blanca Fernández Ochoa (22 April 1963 – 24 August 2019) was a World Cup alpine ski racer from Spain. Born in Madrid, she competed in four Winter Olympics, from 1980 through 1992.

== Career ==
Her four siblings all competed in alpine ski racing for Spain in the Winter Olympics: Dolores, Francisco, Juan Manuel, and Luis. Francisco (1950–2006) won the gold medal in slalom at the 1972 Olympics in Sapporo, Japan.

She received the Premio Reina Sofía for best athlete in 1983 and 1988 by Consejo Superior de Deportes at Premios Nacionales del Deporte. She also received the Real Orden del Mérito Deportivo in 1994. At the 1992 Olympics at Albertville, France, Blanca won the bronze medal in slalom.

During her World Cup career, she had 4 victories, 20 podiums, and 69 top ten finishes.

On 18 July 1991, she married Italian Daniel Fioretto in the Monastery of El Escorial. They ended up divorcing and she contracted a second marriage with David Fresneda, with whom she had two children, David (born 2000) and Olivia (born 1999), although this marriage also ended in divorce. The children live with their father.

She was reported as missing on 24 August 2019 and found dead by a police officer on 4 September 2019 near La Peñota, in the Guadarrama Mountains. Policía Nacional believed it was not an accidental death in a safe area and there were not traumas. On 5 September 2019 it was declared she died from a suicide because lithium tablets and a bottle of wine were found near her body. She died the same day of the disappearance at the age of 56.

== The Blanca Foundation ==
After her death from suicide Blanca's sister Lola Fernández Ochoa founded The Blanca Foundation. The foundation is dedicated to promoting mental health awareness and providing support to individuals facing mental health challenges. Through its various programs and initiatives, the foundation works to reduce the stigma surrounding mental health, offering resources, education, and a platform for open discussions. It focuses on providing accessible mental health services, including counseling and therapeutic support, to underserved communities. By partnering with experts, organizations, and local communities, the Blanca Foundation strives to create a more inclusive, empathetic society where mental health is prioritized, and people have the tools they need to lead healthier, more fulfilling lives.

== World Cup results ==
=== Season standings ===
Season	Age	Overall	Slalom	Giant Slalom	Super-G	Downhill	Combined
1982	18	55	—	28	not run	—	—
1983	19	27	26	—	not awarded	—	—
1984	20	36	27	19	not awarded	—	—
1985	21	10	16	7	not awarded	—	8
1986	22	31	—	10	31	—	19
1987	23	8	18	3	9	—	—
1988	24	4	4	5	3	—	9
1989	25	18	8	19	26	—	—
1990	26	injured, did not compete					
1991	27	10	3	17	—	—	—
1992	28	7	3	8	53	—	—

Points were only awarded for top ten finishes thru 1979, top 15 thru 1991 (see scoring system).

=== Race victories ===
- 4 wins (1 GS, 3 SL)
- 20 podiums (12 GS, 8 SL), 69 top tens

Season	Date	Location	Discipline
1985	3 March 1985	(United States) Vail, USA	Giant slalom
1988	26 November 1987	Sestriere, Italy	Slalom
1991	22 December 1990	Morzine, France	Slalom
1992	1 December 1991	Lech, Austria	Slalom

== World Championship results ==
Year	Location	Age	Slalom	Giant Slalom	Super-G	Downhill	Combined
1980	Lake Placid, United States	16		18			
1982	Schladming, Austria	18					
1985	Bormio, Italy	21	14	9		DNF	
1987	Crans-Montana, Switzerland	23	5	5	10		
1989	Vail, United States	25	4	7			
1991	Saalbach, Austria	27	DNF				

From 1948 through 1980, the Winter Olympics were also the World Championships for alpine skiing.
At the World Championships from 1954 through 1980, the combined was a "paper race" using the results of the three events (DH, GS, SL).

== Olympic results ==
Year	Location	Age	Slalom	Giant Slalom	Super-G	Downhill	Combined
1980	Lake Placid, United States	16	—	18	not run	—	not run
1984	Sarajevo, Yugoslavia	20	DNF2	6	not run	—	not run
1988	Calgary, Canada	24	5	DNF2	21	—	—
1992	Albertville, France	28	3	12	—	—	—

== See also ==
- Lists of solved missing person cases
- List of Olympic medalist families
