= Debbie Armstrong =

American alpine skier

Personal information
- Born: December 6, 1963 (age 62) Salem, Oregon, U.S.
- Height: 5 ft 5 in (165 cm)

Skiing career
- Sport: Alpine skiing
- Retired: March 1988 (age 24)
- Disciplines: Downhill, super-G, giant slalom, slalom, combined
- World Cup debut: December 8, 1982 (age 19)

Olympics
- Teams: 2 – (1984, 1988)
- Medals: 1 (1 gold)

World Championships
- Teams: 3 – (1982, 1985, 1987)
- Medals: 0

World Cup
- Seasons: 6 – (1982–1988)
- Wins: 0
- Podiums: 1 – (1 SG)
- Overall titles: 0 – (20th in 1985)
- Discipline titles: 0 – (12th in GS in 1984; 12th in DH in 1987)
Medal record
Women's alpine skiing
Representing the United States
Olympic Games
Gold medal – first place	1984 Sarajevo	Giant slalom

Debra Rae Armstrong (born December 6, 1963) is a former World Cup alpine ski racer from Seattle, Washington. She was the first Olympic gold medalist from the U.S. in women's alpine skiing in twelve years, winning the giant slalom at the 1984 Winter Olympics in Sarajevo, Yugoslavia.

== Racing career ==
Born in Salem, Oregon, Armstrong grew up in Seattle and was a multi-sport athlete at Garfield High School; in addition to ski racing, she also played basketball, soccer, volleyball, and tennis. Armstrong has been inducted in the Seattle Public Schools Hall of Fame, State of Washington Sports Hall of Fame, and the National Ski Hall of Fame.

Armstrong developed her racing skills in the 1970s at the Alpental ski area at Snoqualmie Pass, an hour east of Seattle on I-90. The run "Debbie's Gold" and the "Armstrong's Express" high-speed quad chairlift are named for her.

She was the junior national champion in giant slalom in 1980 at Squaw Valley. After being named to the U.S. Ski Team in 1981 she placed 14th in her first World Cup Giant slalom in Val d'isere, France starting from bib number 68.

Armstrong made the 1982 World Championship team in Austria, but broke a leg in a downhill training run and did not compete. She was runner-up in the giant slalom at the 1983 U.S. Nationals, and in January 1984, was third in a World Cup super-G and fifth in a giant slalom, shortly before the Olympics.

At the 1984 Winter Olympics in Sarajevo, Armstrong became the first American woman to win a gold medal in skiing since Barbara Cochran won the slalom a dozen years earlier at Sapporo.

At the 1985 World Championships in Bormio, Italy, Armstrong placed 4th in the giant slalom. In 1987 at the World Championships, Armstrong placed sixth in the Super-G. and became the U.S. National Giant slalom Champion.

Defending her gold medal, she finished thirteenth in the giant slalom at the 1988 Winter Olympics in Calgary.

Dr. Hubert Armstrong, Armstrong's father, is a clinical psychologist at the University of Washington; he participated in the 1988 Winter Olympics, representing the US luge team as the sports psychologist. His 1986 Parenting the Elite Athlete (Armstrong, Hubert E., Jr., Ph.D. (February/March 1986) has gained traction as a classic sport parenting article in alpine ski racing.

She completed her World Cup career with 18 top ten finishes: 7 in downhill, three in Super-G, five in giant slalom, and three in combined.

== World Cup results ==
=== Season standings ===
Season	Age	Overall	Slalom	Giant Slalom	Super G	Downhill	Combined
1983	19	33	—	26	not awarded (w/ GS)	19	20
1984	20	24	—	12	not awarded (w/ GS)	37	15
1985	21	20	—	16	not awarded (w/ GS)	23	19
1986	22	35	—	—	20	21	17
1987	23	22	—	18	20	12	—
1988	24	94	—	32	—	—	—

=== Top ten finishes ===
- 0 wins, 1 podium (SG), 18 top tens (7 DH, 3 SG, 5 GS, 3K)

Season	Date	Location	Race	Place
1983	15 Dec 1982	San Sicario, Italy	Downhill	7th
1983	29 Jan 1983	Les Diablerets, Switzerland	Downhill	5th
1984	8 Jan 1984	Puy St. Vincent, France	Super-G	3rd
1984	29 Jan 1984	St. Gervais, France	Combined	6th
1984	29 Jan 1984	St. Gervais, France	Giant slalom	5th
1984	(Socialist Federal Republic of Yugoslavia) 1984 Winter Olympics			
1984	21 Mar 1984	Zwiesel, West Germany	Giant slalom	9th
1985	15 Dec 1984	Madonna di Campiglio, Italy	Giant slalom	5th
1985	17 Dec 1984	Santa Caterina, Italy	Giant slalom	4th
1985	9 Jan 1985	Santa Caterina, Italy	Combined	8th
1985	(Italy) 1985 World Championships			
1985	9 Mar 1985	Banff, AB, Canada	Downhill	8th
1985	10 Mar 1985	Banff, AB, Canada	Super G	7th
1985	17 Mar 1985	(United States) Waterville Valley, NH, USA	Giant slalom	10th
1986	7 Dec 1985	Sestriere, Italy	Super G	4th
1986	12 Dec 1985	Val d'Isère, France	Downhill	5th
1986	13 Dec 1985	Val d'Isère, France	Downhill	7th
1986	6 Jan 1986	(Socialist Federal Republic of Yugoslavia) Maribor, Yugoslavia	Combined	6th
1987	12 Dec 1986	Val d'Isère, France	Downhill	6th
1987	13 Dec 1986	Val d'Isère, France	Downhill	4th
1987	(Switzerland) 1987 World Championships			

== World championship results ==
Year	Age	Slalom	Giant Slalom	Super-G	Downhill	Combined
1985	21	—	4	—N/a	23	DNF SL1
1987	23	—	17	6	13	—

== Olympic results ==
Year	Age	Slalom	Giant Slalom	Super-G	Downhill	Combined
1984	20	—	1	—N/a	21	—N/a
1988	24	—	13	18	—	—

== Post-racing ==
After her retirement from competitive skiing following the 1988 World Cup season, Armstrong has led various humanitarian causes, including the Debbie Armstrong Say No to Alcohol and Drugs campaign; the SKIFORALL Foundation, which opens skiing events to the disabled; and Global ReLeaf Sarajevo, which seeks to reforest Sarajevo after the Bosnian war. Armstrong moved to Albuquerque, NM and attended University of New Mexico and earned an undergraduate degree (Bachelor of Science) in History.

Armstrong served as the Ski Ambassador at Taos Ski Valley for eight seasons. Simultaneously, she served a four-year term on the Professional Ski Instructors of America (PSIA) Alpine Demo Team which marked the first time a former US Ski Team athlete qualified for the Demo Team.

The PSIA Demo Team (now known as the PSIA-AASI Alpine Team) is made up of the top ski instructors in the nation. These professionals are "some of the best skiers and riders in the game and they are inspirational educators and lifelong learners. Every four years, thirty men and women are chosen to represent the association following a rigorous selection process. Team members are responsible for promoting, supporting, and assisting with the development of PSIA-AASI education materials, programs, and activities at all levels. They set the standard for U.S. snowsports instruction and embody the ski and snowboard experience."

In 2007, Armstrong moved to Steamboat Springs, Colorado where she served one year as Technical Director for the Steamboat Ski Resort (Armstrong 2008, p. 36). In 2008, she became the Alpine Director at the Steamboat Springs Winter Sports Club, a world-renowned ski club located in Steamboat Springs, Colorado, a position she held for six years. From 2014 to 2017, Armstrong served as U10 Head Coach position and Coach Trainer at the Sports Club. The U10 cohort Deb coached at Steamboat Springs Winter Sports Club dominated at the 2023 U16 Nationals, and OPA Cup 2023, and the 2024 U18 Nationals

Armstrong has served on the board of Washington State Ski and Snowboard Museum (WSSSM) since 2022.

In 2024, Armstrong was given the PSIA-AASI Distinguished Service Award.

Currently, Armstong produces specialized training videos for coaches and athletes on her YouTube channel and runs SkiStrong clinics for adults at Taos Ski Valley and Steamboat Springs.

== Bibliography ==
- Armstrong Jr., Ph.D., Hubert E.(February/March, 1986). "Parenting the Elite Athlete", Puget Soundings, p6.
- Armstrong, Deb (September, 1987). "The importance of being an all-around athlete [Athlete Point of View]", American Ski Coach, v11, n1, p38.
- Armstrong, Deb (Fall, 2001). "IMSIA mountain rendezvous 2001: a success of olympic proportions", the professional skier, p44.
- Armstrong, Deb (Winter, 2003). "Turning to tipping and back again: a process of rediscovery", the professional skier, p8.
- Armstrong, Deb (Spring, 2004). "To vary your turn radius, improve your range of lateral motion", the professional skier, p28.
- Armstrong, Deb (Winter, 2005). "Avoid the rainbow rut with new turn tactis", the professional skier, p34.
- Armstrong, Deb (Spring, 2005). "Training for life", the professional skier, p16.
- Armstrong, Deb (Fall, 2005). "My winter with Otto Lang", the professional skier, p28.
- Armstrong, Deb (Winter, 2006). "US Ski Team shares its alpine tactics", the professional skier, p30.
- Armstrong, Deb (Fall, 2006). "Where are you going? A look at directional movement", the professional skier, p26.
- Armstrong, Deb (Spring, 2008). "It's hip to think hips, even if you're a fan of the ankles", the professional skier, p32.
