= Argentina at the 1988 Winter Olympics =

- IOC code: ARG
- NOC: Argentine Olympic Committee
- Website: www.coarg.org.ar (in Spanish)

in Calgary
- Competitors: 15 (10 men and 5 women) in 4 sports
- Flag bearer: Julio Moreschi (cross-country skiing)
- Medals: Gold 0 Silver 0 Bronze 0 Total 0

Winter Olympics appearances (overview)
- 1928; 1932–1936; 1948; 1952; 1956; 1960; 1964; 1968; 1972; 1976; 1980; 1984; 1988; 1992; 1994; 1998; 2002; 2006; 2010; 2014; 2018; 2022; 2026

Argentina competed at the 1988 Winter Olympics in Calgary, Alberta, Canada.

== Competitors ==
The following is the list of number of competitors in the Games.

Sport	Men	Women	Total
Alpine skiing	5	5	10
Biathlon	3	–	3
Cross-country skiing	1	0	1
Luge	1	0	1
Total	10	5	15

== Alpine skiing ==
Men

Athlete	Event	Race 1	Race 2	Total	
Athlete	Event	Time	Time	Time	Rank
Javier Rivara	Downhill			2:16.79	45
Jorge Birkner	Downhill			2:14.20	44
Ignacio Birkner	Super-G			DSQ	–
Federico van Ditmar	Super-G			DNF	–
Javier Rivara	Super-G			DNF	–
Jorge Birkner	Super-G			1:53.79	39
Federico van Ditmar	Giant Slalom	DNF	–	DNF	–
Javier Rivara	Giant Slalom	1:15.69	1:12.96	2:28.65	47
Ignacio Birkner	Giant Slalom	1:14.67	1:11.41	2:26.08	46
Jorge Birkner	Giant Slalom	1:13.36	1:10.87	2:24.23	45
Jorge Carlos Eiras	Slalom	DNF	–	DNF	–
Ignacio Birkner	Slalom	DNF	–	DNF	–
Javier Rivara	Slalom	1:01.12	DSQ	DSQ	–
Jorge Birkner	Slalom	1:01.11	55.86	1:56.97	26

Men's combined

Athlete	Downhill	Slalom		Total	
Athlete	Time	Time 1	Time 2	Points	Rank
Jorge Birkner	1:59.37	49.74	48.67	243.99	24
Javier Rivara	1:58.28	DNF	–	DNF	–

Women

Athlete	Event	Race 1	Race 2	Total	
Athlete	Event	Time	Time	Time	Rank
Mariela Vallecillo	Downhill			DNF	–
Astrid Steverlynck	Downhill			1:41.64	28
Carolina Eiras	Downhill			1:37.37	27
Astrid Steverlynck	Super-G			1:36.51	41
Mariela Vallecillo	Super-G			1:33.49	39
Carolina Eiras	Super-G			1:29.87	37
Carolina Birkner	Super-G			1:28.42	36
Magdalena Birkner	Giant Slalom	DNF	–	DNF	–
Astrid Steverlynck	Giant Slalom	1:10.63	DNF	DNF	–
Carolina Eiras	Giant Slalom	1:07.92	1:14.16	2:22.08	25
Carolina Birkner	Giant Slalom	1:06.46	1:14.30	2:20.76	24
Magdalena Birkner	Slalom	DSQ	–	DSQ	–
Astrid Steverlynck	Slalom	1:03.06	1:01.96	2:05.02	24
Carolina Birkner	Slalom	59.57	58.15	1:57.72	22
Carolina Eiras	Slalom	57.17	55.56	1:52.73	20

Women's combined

Athlete	Downhill	Slalom		Total	
Athlete	Time	Time 1	Time 2	Points	Rank
Mariela Vallecillo	1:27.25	50.16	52.98	352.72	26
Astrid Steverlynck	1:26.89	DNF	–	DNF	–
Carolina Birkner	1:25.10	46.70	48.78	255.95	25
Carolina Eiras	1:24.93	45.79	49.06	248.10	24

== Biathlon ==
Men

Event	Athlete	Misses ^{1}	Time	Rank
10 km Sprint	Gustavo Giró	6	36:38.8	70
10 km Sprint	Luis Argel	8	32:25.1	68
10 km Sprint	Alejandro Giró	3	33:55.4	65

Event	Athlete	Time	Misses	Adjusted time ^{2}	Rank
20 km	Gustavo Giró	DSQ	–	DSQ	–
20 km	Luis Argel	1'12:47.6	11	1'23:47.6	67
20 km	Alejandro Giró	1'11:34.4	5	1'16:34.4	64

^{1} A penalty loop of 150 metres had to be skied per missed target.
^{2} One minute added per missed target.

== Cross-country skiing ==
Men

Event	Athlete	Race	
Event	Athlete	Time	Rank
15 km C	Julio Moreschi	DNF	–
30 km C	Julio Moreschi	1'41:40.3	71
50 km F	Julio Moreschi	2'28:36.5	59

C = Classical style, F = Freestyle

== Luge ==
Men

Athlete	Run 1		Run 2		Run 3		Run 4		Total	
Athlete	Time	Rank	Time	Rank	Time	Rank	Time	Rank	Time	Rank
Rubén González	49.567	32	49.628	32	53.685	36	48.947	31	3:21.827	33
