= Alpine skiing at the 1992 Winter Olympics – Women's downhill =

Women's Downhill at the XVI Olympic Winter Games
- Alpine skiing
- Venue: Meribel
- Date: February 15, 1992
- Competitors: 30 from 12 nations
- Winning time: 1:52.55

Medalists
1st place, gold medalist(s)		Kerrin Lee-Gartner	Canada
2nd place, silver medalist(s)		Hilary Lindh	United States
3rd place, bronze medalist(s)		Veronika Stallmaier	Austria

Women's downhill
- Location: Meribel – Roc de Fer
- Vertical: 828 m (2,717 ft)
- Top elevation: 2,260 m (7,415 ft)
- Base elevation: 1,432 m (4,698 ft)

The Women's downhill competition of the Albertville 1992 Olympics was held at Meribel on Saturday, 15 February.

The defending world champion was Petra Kronberger of Austria, while Switzerland's Chantal Bournissen was the defending World Cup downhill champion and Germany's Katja Seizinger led the current season.

Kerrin Lee-Gartner of Canada won the gold medal, Hilary Lindh of the United States took the silver, and Veronika Wallinger of Austria was the bronze medalist. Seizinger and Kronberger were close behind and just off the podium, while Bournissen failed to finish. (Seizinger won the next two editions in 1994 and 1998.)

The Roc de Fer (iron rock) course started at an elevation of 2,260 m (7,415 ft) above sea level with a vertical drop of 828 m (2,717 ft) and a course length of 2.770 km (1.72 mi). Lee-Gartner's winning time was 112.55 seconds, yielding an average course speed of 88.601 km/h (55.1 mph), with an average vertical descent rate of 7.357 m/s (24.1 ft/s).

Lee-Gartner was the first from outside the Alps to win a women's speed event (downhill, super-G) at the Olympics; through 2018, she remains the only Canadian to win an Olympic speed event.

== Results ==
The race was started at 11:15 local time, (UTC +1). At the starting gate, the skies were overcast, the temperature was −2.0 °C (28.4 °F), and the snow condition was fresh; the temperature at the finish was lower, at −3.0 °C (26.6 °F).

Rank	Name	Country	Time	Difference
1st place, gold medalist(s)	Kerrin Lee-Gartner	Canada	1:52.55	—
2nd place, silver medalist(s)	Hilary Lindh	United States	1:52.61	+0.06
3rd place, bronze medalist(s)	Veronika Wallinger	Austria	1:52.64	+0.09
4	Katja Seizinger	Germany	1:52.67	+0.12
5	Petra Kronberger	Austria	1:52.73	+0.18
6	Katrin Gutensohn	Germany	1:53.71	+1.16
7	Barbara Sadleder	Austria	1:53.81	+1.26
8	Svetlana Gladysheva	Unified Team	1:53.85	+1.30
9	Miriam Vogt	Germany	1:53.89	+1.34
10	Heidi Zurbriggen	Switzerland	1:54.04	+1.49
11	Emi Kawabata	Japan	1:54.52	+1.97
12	Krista Schmidinger	United States	1:54.59	+2.04
13	Heidi Zeller	Switzerland	1:54.73	+2.18
13	Carole Merle	France	1:54.73	+2.18
15	Astrid Lødemel	Norway	1:54.76	+2.21
16	Lucia Medzihradská	Czechoslovakia	1:54.78	+2.23
17	Régine Cavagnoud	France	1:54.94	+2.39
18	Michaela Gerg	Germany	1:54.99	+2.44
19	Tetiana Lebedeva	Unified Team	1:55.15	+2.60
20	Michelle McKendry	Canada	1:55.61	+3.06
21	Marlis Spescha	Switzerland	1:55.83	+3.28
22	Cathy Chedal	France	1:55.91	+3.36
23	Marie-Pierre Gatel	France	1:56.25	+3.70
24	Ľudmila Milanová	Czechoslovakia	1:57.85	+5.30
25	Edith Thys	United States	1:58.13	+5.58
26	Sachiko Yamamoto	Japan	1:58.52	+5.97
27	Svetlana Novikova	Unified Team	1:59.18	+6.63
28	Mihaela Fera	Romania	2:01.27	+8.72
29	Carolina Eiras	Argentina	2:02.81	+10.26
-	Chantal Bournissen	Switzerland	DNF	-
-	Warwara Zelenskaja	Unified Team	DNS	-
