= Czechoslovakia at the 1988 Winter Olympics =

- IOC code: TCH
- NOC: Czechoslovak Olympic Committee

in Calgary
- Competitors: 60 (50 men, 10 women) in 9 sports
- Flag bearer: Jiří Parma (ski jumping)
- Medals Ranked 15th: Gold 0 Silver 1 Bronze 2 Total 3

Winter Olympics appearances (overview)
- 1924; 1928; 1932; 1936; 1948; 1952; 1956; 1960; 1964; 1968; 1972; 1976; 1980; 1984; 1988; 1992

Other related appearances
- Czech Republic (1994–pres.); Slovakia (1994–pres.)

Czechoslovakia competed at the 1988 Winter Olympics in Calgary, Alberta, Canada.

== Competitors ==
The following is the list of number of competitors in the Games.

Sport	Men	Women	Total
Alpine skiing	2	3	5
Biathlon	5	–	5
Cross-country skiing	6	4	10
Figure skating	3	3	6
Ice hockey	23	–	23
Luge	2	0	2
Nordic combined	4	–	4
Ski jumping	4	–	4
Speed skating	1	0	1
Total	50	10	60

== Medalists ==
Medal	Name	Sport	Event	Date
Silver	Pavel Ploc	Ski jumping	Normal hill individual	14 February
Bronze	Jiří Malec	Ski jumping	Normal hill individual	14 February
Bronze	Radim Nyč; Václav Korunka; Pavel Benc; Ladislav Švanda	Cross-country skiing	Men's 4 × 10 kilometre relay	22 February

== Alpine skiing ==
Men

Athlete	Event	Final					
Athlete	Event	Run 1	Rank	Run 2	Rank	Total	Rank
Adrián Bíreš	Downhill	—N/a				2:06.34	33
Adrián Bíreš	Super-G	—N/a				1:45.33	23
Adrián Bíreš	Giant slalom	did not finish					
Adrián Bíreš	Slalom	54.88	23	50.25	15	1:45.13	15
Peter Jurko	Downhill	—N/a				2:05.32	29
Peter Jurko	Super-G	—N/a				1:46.03	27
Peter Jurko	Giant slalom	1:09.21	35	1:06.29	33	2:15.50	33
Peter Jurko	Slalom	53.50	19	48.71	10	1:42.21	13

Men's combined

Athlete	Downhill			Slalom					Total	
Athlete	Time	Points	Rank	Time 1	Time 2	Total	Points	Rank	Points	Rank
Adrián Bíreš	1:50.24	36.87	16	45.94	43.00	1:28.94	31.63	12	68.50	8
Peter Jurko	1:50.29	37.42	19	44.32	43.29	1:27.61	21.14	8	58.56	5

Women

Athlete	Event	Final					
Athlete	Event	Run 1	Rank	Run 2	Rank	Total	Rank
Lucia Medzihradská	Downhill	—N/a				1:27.28	10
Lucia Medzihradská	Giant slalom	1:03.79	30	1:10.64	19	2:14.43	20
Lucia Medzihradská	Slalom	51.08	16	51.10	12	1:42.18	13
Ľudmila Milanová	Downhill	—N/a				1:30.42	24
Ľudmila Milanová	Super-G	—N/a				1:23.92	29
Ľudmila Milanová	Giant slalom	did not finish					
Ľudmila Milanová	Slalom	53.93	28	did not finish			
Lenka Kebrlová	Giant slalom	1:04.09	33	1:11.08	21	2:15.17	23
Lenka Kebrlová	Slalom	51.01	14	51.11	13	1:42.12	12

Women's combined

Athlete	Downhill			Slalom					Total	
Athlete	Time	Points	Rank	Time 1	Time 2	Total	Points	Rank	Points	Rank
Lenka Kebrlová	1:18.43	30.40	13	40.91	43.47	1:24.38	30.47	5	60.87	5
Lucia Medzihradská	1:18.62	33.34	15	41.62	42.73	1:24.35	30.22	4	63.56	6
Ľudmila Milanová	did not finish									

== Biathlon ==
Athlete	Event	Final		
Athlete	Event	Time	Misses	Rank
František Chládek	Individual	1:04:01.3	4	44
Jiří Holubec	Individual	1:02:08.3	5	32
Jiří Holubec	Sprint	27:29.8	3	28
Tomáš Kos	Individual	1:01:02.7	3	22
Tomáš Kos	Sprint	27:13.5	1	24
Jan Matouš	Individual	59:35.3	3	14
Jan Matouš	Sprint	26:33.3	1	16
Jaromír Šimůnek	Sprint	27:38.6	1	34
Jiří Holubec; František Chládek; Tomáš Kos; Jan Matouš	Relay	1:30:48.8	3	11

== Cross-country skiing ==
Men

Athlete	Event	Race	
Athlete	Event	Time	Rank
Pavel Benc	15 km classical	46:01.6	41
Pavel Benc	50 km freestyle	2:12:08.4	27
Václav Korunka	15 km classical	44:47.6	28
Martin Petrásek	15 km classical	46:07.8	43
Martin Petrásek	30 km classical	1:31:56.1	32
Ladislav Švanda	15 km classical	43:40.9	19
Ladislav Švanda	30 km classical	1:28:55.1	17
Ladislav Švanda	50 km freestyle	2:09:08.1	15
Petr Lisičan	30 km classical	1:31:23.1	29
Petr Lisičan	50 km freestyle	2:11:44.4	23
Radim Nyč	30 km classical	1:30:34.4	25
Radim Nyč	50 km freestyle	2:10:46.3	20
Radim Nyč; Václav Korunka; Pavel Benc; Ladislav Švanda	4×10 km relay	1:45:22.7	3rd place, bronze medalist(s)

Women

Athlete	Event	Race	
Athlete	Event	Time	Rank
Ľubomíra Balážová	5 km classical	16:30.9	30
Ľubomíra Balážová	10 km classical	32:30.3	27
Ľubomíra Balážová	20 km freestyle	1:02:25.0	33
Alžbeta Havrančíková	5 km classical	16:28.3	29
Alžbeta Havrančíková	10 km classical	32:59.1	31
Alžbeta Havrančíková	20 km freestyle	58:51.4	13
Viera Klimková	5 km classical	16:14.1	22
Viera Klimková	10 km classical	33:23.0	35
Viera Klimková	20 km freestyle	59:22.5	17
Ivana Rádlová	5 km classical	16:43.6	38
Ivana Rádlová	20 km freestyle	1:02:25.4	34
Ľubomíra Balážová; Viera Klimková; Ivana Rádlová; Alžbeta Havrančíková	4×5 km relay	1:03:37.1	7

== Figure skating ==
Athlete(s)	Event	CF/CD	SP/OD	FS/FD	Total	
Athlete(s)	Event	FP	FP	FP	TFP	Rank
Petr Barna	Men's	15	15 Q	12	27.0	13
Iveta Voralová	Ladies'	22	12 Q	19	37.0	20
Lenka Knapová & René Novotný	Pairs	—N/a	8	did not finish		
Viera Řeháková & Ivan Havránek	Ice dancing	14	15	15	29.4	15

== Ice hockey ==
- Squad:
  - Goalkeepers: Petr Bříza, Dominik Hašek, Jaromír Šindel
  - Defenders: Jaroslav Benák, Mojmír Božík, Miloslav Hořava, Antonín Stavjaňa, Rudolf Suchánek, Bedřich Ščerban, Eduard Uvíra
  - Forwards: Jiří Doležal, Oto Haščák, Jiří Hrdina, Jiří Lála, Igor Liba, Dušan Pašek, Radim Raděvič, Vladimír Růžička, Petr Rosol, Jiří Šejba, Petr Vlk, Rostislav Vlach, David Volek
  - Coaches: Ján Starší, František Pospíšil

First round

=== Group B ===
	Pld	W	L	T	GF	GA	Pts
Soviet Union	5	5	0	0	32	10	10
West Germany	5	4	1	0	19	12	8
Czechoslovakia	5	3	2	0	23	14	6
United States	5	2	3	0	27	27	4
Austria	5	0	4	1	12	29	1
Norway	5	0	4	1	11	32	1

  - lost to West Germany 1-2 (goal: Hrdina)
  - beat United States 7-5 (goals: Pašek 2, Stavjaňa 2, Rosol, Růžička, Liba)
  - beat Norway 10-1 (goals: Pašek 2, Benák, Lála, Liba, Volek, Hrdina, Stavjaňa, Suchánek, Vlk)
  - beat Austria 4-0 (goals: Hořava, Šejba, Božík, Pašek)
  - lost to Soviet Union 1-6 (goal: Lála)

Final round

	Pld	W	L	T	GF	GA	Pts
Soviet Union	5	4	1	0	25	7	8
Finland	5	3	1	1	18	10	7
Sweden	5	2	1	2	15	16	6
Canada	5	2	2	1	17	14	5
West Germany	5	1	4	0	8	26	2
Czechoslovakia	5	1	4	0	12	22	2

  - lost to Sweden 2-6 (goals: Haščák, Růžička)
  - beat Finland 5-2 (goals: Liba 2, Šejba, Pašek, Růžička)
  - lost to Finland 3-6 (goals: Stavjaňa, Šejba, Růžička)

== Luge ==
Athlete(s)	Event	Run 1	Run 2	Run 3	Run 4	Total	
Athlete(s)	Event	Time	Time	Time	Time	Time	Rank
Luboš Jíra	Men's	47.647	47.569	47.819	47.822	3:10.857	21
Petr Urban	Men's	46.917	47.215	47.133	47.359	3:08.624	16
Petr Urban; Luboš Jíra	Doubles	46.388	47.233	—N/a		1:33.621	13

== Nordic combined ==
Athlete	Event	Ski jumping		Cross-country		
Athlete	Event	Points	Rank	Deficit	Time	Rank
Ján Klimko	Individual	198.1	21	+3:22.7	44:06.3 +4:38.8	27
Miroslav Kopal	Individual	208.7	12	+2:12.0	41:00.0 +1:32.5	7
Ladislav Patráš	Individual	196.8	23	+3:31.4	43:24.9 +3:31.4	23
František Repka	Individual	184.1	34	+4:56.0	44:30.1 +5:02.6	30
Miroslav Kopal; Ladislav Patráš; Ján Klimko	Team	573.5	4	+4:41.5	1:23:43.1 +2:57.1	6

== Ski jumping ==
Athlete	Event	Jump 1		Jump 2			
Athlete	Event	Points	Rank	Points	Rank	Total	Rank
Ladislav Dluhoš	Normal hill individual	103.6	9	87.4	32	191.0	14
Ladislav Dluhoš	Large hill individual	99.2	19	90.3	12	189.5	14
Jiří Malec	Normal hill individual	106.9	2	104.9	4	211.8	3rd place, bronze medalist(s)
Jiří Malec	Large hill individual	101.0	14	80.2	31	181.2	24
Jiří Parma	Normal hill individual	102.2	13	101.6	5	203.8	5
Jiří Parma	Large hill individual	89.2	35	86.1	17	175.3	29
Pavel Ploc	Normal hill individual	105.3	7	106.8	2	212.1	2nd place, silver medalist(s)
Pavel Ploc	Large hill individual	112.7	3	91.4	11	204.1	5
Ladislav Dluhoš; Jiří Malec; Jiří Parma; Pavel Ploc	Large hill team	296.1	3	290.7	4	586.8	4

== Speed skating ==
Men

Athlete	Event	Final	
Athlete	Event	Time	Rank
Jiří Kyncl	1500 m	1:58.44	34
Jiří Kyncl	5000 m	6:59.82	25
Jiří Kyncl	10000 m	14:27.32	16
