= Ulrike Maier =

Austrian alpine skier (1967–1994)

Personal information
- Born: 22 October 1967 Rauris, Salzburg, Austria
- Died: 29 January 1994 (aged 26) Murnau, Bavaria, Germany
- Height: 163 cm (5 ft 4 in)

Skiing career
- Sport: Alpine skiing
- Club: USC Rauris
- Disciplines: Downhill, super-G, giant slalom, slalom, combined
- World Cup debut: 9 December 1984 (age 17)

Olympics
- Teams: 2 – (1988, 1992)

World Championships
- Teams: 3 – (1989, 1991, 1993)
- Medals: 3 (2 gold)

World Cup
- Seasons: 9 – (1985–1989, 1991–1994)
- Wins: 5 – (2 SG, 3 GS)
- Podiums: 21
- Overall titles: 0 – (5th in 1993)
- Discipline titles: 0 – (2nd in SG, 1993)
Medal record
Women's alpine skiing
Representing Austria
World Championships
Gold medal – first place	1989 Vail	Super-G
Gold medal – first place	1991 Saalbach	Super-G
Silver medal – second place	1991 Saalbach	Giant slalom

Ulrike Maier (22 October 1967 – 29 January 1994) was a World Cup alpine ski racer from Austria, a two-time World Champion in super-G. She competed at the 1988 Winter Olympics and the 1992 Winter Olympics.

Born in Rauris, Salzburg, where her father ran a ski school, Maier won the super-G gold medal at the World Championships in both 1989 and 1991. She also took home the giant slalom silver medal in the 1991 event. Her first of five World Cup wins came in November 1992 and she attained 21 podiums and 59 top ten finishes in her World Cup career.

== Accident ==
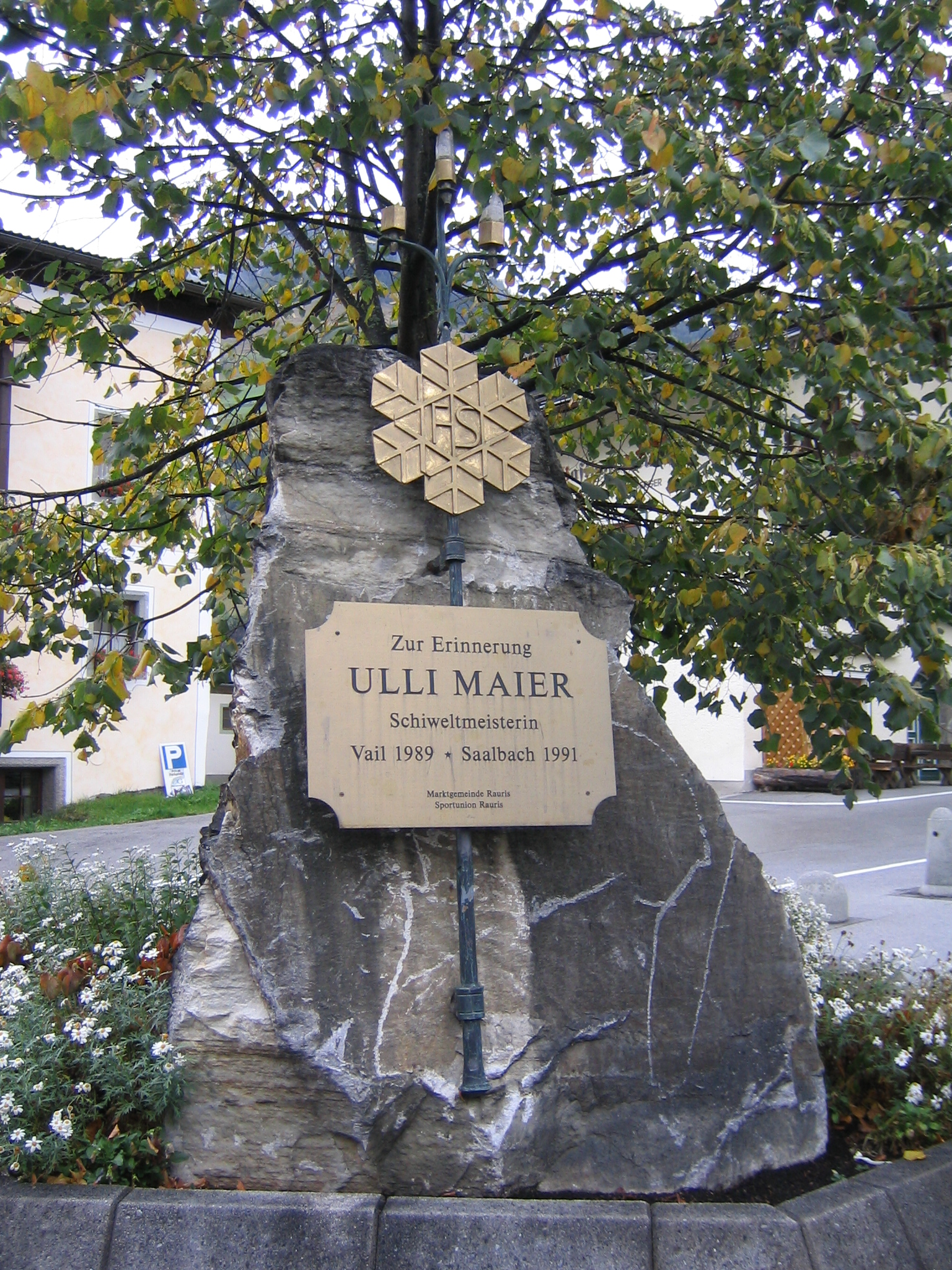
Memorial stone of Ulrike Maier in Rauris

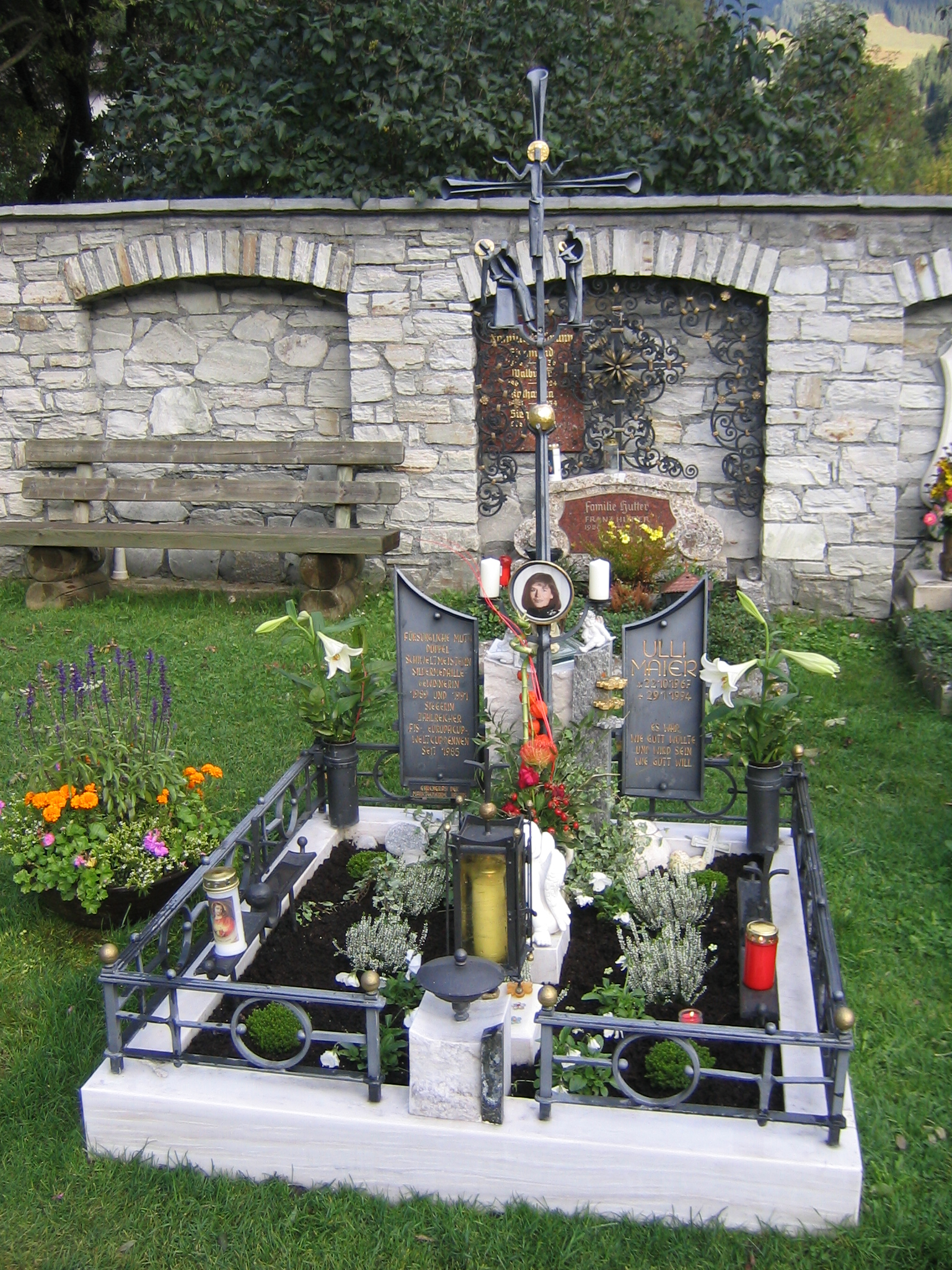
Grave of Maier in Rauris cemetery

Two weeks prior to the 1994 Winter Olympics, the women's World Cup was in Garmisch-Partenkirchen, Germany, in late January. The downhill on the classic Kandahar course at Garmisch Classic was held on Saturday, 29 January, following an overnight snowfall. In a narrow part of the lower course less than twenty seconds from the finish, Maier's right ski caught an inside edge at 105 km/h (65 mph), possibly from a patch of soft snow, and caused a violent crash which broke her neck.

She died of her injuries shortly after being evacuated to the hospital in nearby Murnau. At the age of 26, she had considered retirement at the end of the 1994 season, due to a dip in form that resulted in disappointing performances at the 1992 Olympic Games in France and the 1993 World Championships in Japan. However, she had bounced back by winning two giant slaloms during the 1994 season and claiming podium finishes in the two Super Gs of Cortina. Following these results, she was reconsidering her decision in the days before the fateful downhill run, planning to continue until the 1995 World Championships in Spain.

Unlike most other fatal skiing accidents, her crash happened during a live television broadcast. Maier was survived by her daughter Melanie (b. 1989) and was buried in her home village of Rauris, where thousands attended her funeral. Teammate and close friend Anita Wachter wore Maier's world championship medals in the procession.

Initially it was claimed that her death was caused by hitting a wooden timing post. Based on that claim, Maier's fiancé Hubert Schweighofer criticized the organizers of the race and filed suit against them. However, several months later the court found that Maier actually did not hit the timing post with her head, but probably broke her neck by crashing into a pile of snow on the border of the race course. The court did not find any negligence from the organizers and dismissed the suit. Manslaughter charges against two FIS race officials were dropped after a settlement was reached in 1996.

== World Cup results ==
=== Season standings ===
Season	Age	Overall	Slalom	Giant slalom	Super-G	Downhill	Combined
1985	17	62	29	—	—	—	30
1986	18	77	33	—	—	—	—
1987	19	35	19	32	—	—	—
1988	20	8	10	9	6	—	10
1989	21	7	13	4	4	—	2
1990	22						
1991	23	30	—	9	26	—	—
1992	24	13	33	6	4	36	—
1993	25	5	32	4	2	45	14
1994	26	7	33	4	7	46	11

=== Race podiums ===
- 5 wins: (2 SG, 3 GS)
- 21 podiums: (8 SG, 10 GS, 1 SL, 1 PS, 1 K)

Season	Date	Location	Discipline	Place
1988	30 Nov 1987	Courmayeur, Italy	Slalom	3rd
1988	7 Mar 1988	(United States) Aspen, USA	Giant slalom	3rd
1988	13 Mar 1988	Rossland, Canada	Super-G	2nd
1988	23 Mar 1988	Saalbach, Austria	Giant slalom	3rd
1988	27 Mar 1988	Saalbach, Austria	Parallel slalom	2nd
1989	26 Nov 1988	Schladming, Austria	Super-G	2nd
1989	28 Nov 1988	Les Menuires, France	Giant slalom	3rd
1989	16 Dec 1988	Altenmarkt, Austria	Combined	2nd
1989	6 Jan 1989	Schwarzenberg, Austria	Giant slalom	2nd
1989	7 Jan 1989	Schwarzenberg, Austria	Giant slalom	2nd
1991	22 Mar 1991	(United States) Waterville Valley, USA	Giant slalom	2nd
1992	26 Jan 1992	Morzine, France	Super-G	2nd
1993	28 Nov 1992	(United States) Park City, USA	Giant slalom	1st
1993	13 Dec 1992	(United States) Vail, USA	Super-G	1st
1993	16 Jan 1993	Cortina d'Ampezzo, Italy	Super-G	1st
1993	20 Mar 1993	Åre, Sweden	Super-G	2nd
1994	26 Nov 1993	Santa Caterina, Italy	Giant slalom	3rd
1994	27 Nov 1993	Santa Caterina, Italy	Giant slalom	1st
1994	15 Jan 1994	Cortina d'Ampezzo, Italy	Super-G	2nd
1994	17 Jan 1994	Cortina d'Ampezzo, Italy	Super-G	3rd
1994	21 Jan 1994	Maribor, Slovenia	Giant slalom	1st

== World Championship results ==
Year	Age	Slalom	Giant slalom	Super-G	Downhill	Combined
1989	21	—	8	1	—	—
1991	23	—	2	1	—	—
1993	25	—	15	14	—	—

== Olympic results ==
Year	Age	Slalom	Giant slalom	Super-G	Downhill	Combined
1988	20	10	6	—	—	—
1992	24	—	4	5	—	—

Awards
Preceded by (Austria) Sigrid Wolf	Austrian Sportswoman of the year 1989	Succeeded by (Austria) Petra Kronberger
