= Kerrin Lee-Gartner =

Canadian alpine skier

Personal information
- Born: September 21, 1966 (age 60) Trail, British Columbia, Canada
- Height: 1.71 m (5 ft 7 in)

Skiing career
- Sport: Alpine skiing
- Club: Red Mountain Racers
- Retired: March 1994 (age 27)
- Disciplines: Downhill, Super-G, giant slalom, Combined
- World Cup debut: March 10, 1985 (age 18) (first top 15 finish)

Olympics
- Teams: 3 – (1988, 1992, 1994)
- Medals: 1 (1 gold)

World Championships
- Teams: 3 – (1989, 1991, 1993)
- Medals: 0

World Cup
- Seasons: 9 – (1985, 1987–94)
- Wins: 0
- Podiums: 6 – (4 DH, 2 SG)
- Overall titles: 0 – (9th in 1993)
- Discipline titles: 0 – (3rd in DH, 1993)
Medal record
Women's alpine skiing
Representing Canada
Olympic Games
Gold medal – first place	1992 Albertville	Downhill

Kerrin Anne Lee-Gartner (born September 21, 1966) is a former World Cup alpine ski racer and Olympic gold medallist from Canada.

Born in Trail, British Columbia, she grew up in Rossland and raced as a youngster at Red Mountain. Lee-Gartner started skiing for the Canadian Women's Ski Team in 1982, but suffered a number of knee operations over the years including two complete reconstructions. She attained her first World Cup podium early in December 1990, then had five more top-six finishes early in the 1992 season entering the Winter Olympics in Albertville, France.

On the Roc de Fer course at Méribel, Lee-Gartner won the gold medal in the Olympic downhill. Only 0.06 seconds behind was silver medallist Hilary Lindh of the U.S., for a North American 1–2 finish. Through 2018, it remains the only victory in an Olympic downhill by a Canadian. She finished sixth in the Olympic super-G and had two more podiums after the Olympics, both in North America, to finish up the 1992 season.

Lee-Gartner's next season in 1993 was her best on the World Cup circuit, with two podiums and twelve top tens. She finished third in the downhill standings and ninth overall. At the World Championships in Japan, she was fourth in the super-G and ninth in the downhill.

Leading up to the 1994 Winter Olympics, Lee-Gartner was admittedly affected by the death of her friend Ulrike Maier after a crash in a downhill race in late January. At the Olympics in Norway, she finished eighth in the super-G and 19th in the downhill, and retired from international competition a month later, at the end of the 1994 World Cup season.

Lee-Gartner is currently a television broadcaster with CBC Sports in Canada. She also assisted the BBC with coverage of the 2010 Winter Olympics in Vancouver.

== World Cup results ==
=== Season standings ===
Season	Age	Overall	Slalom	Giant slalom	Super-G	Downhill	Combined
1985	18	82	–	43	—	—	—
1986	19						
1987	20	77	–	–	–	32	—
1988	21	48	–	–	26	10	16
1989	22	51	–	–	–	24	22
1990	23	49	–	–	–	14	—
1991	24	16	–	–	16	9	—
1992	25	14	–	29	7	4	—
1993	26	9	–	26	7	3	19
1994	27	34	–	34	11	28	—

=== Race podiums ===
- 6 podiums – (4 DH, 2 SG)

Season	Date	Location	Discipline	Place
1991	Dec 28, 1990	Altenmarkt, Austria	Downhill	3rd
1992	Mar 7, 1992	Vail, CO, USA	Downhill	2nd
1992	Mar 15, 1992	Panorama, British Columbia, Canada	Super-G	2nd
1993	Dec 12, 1992	Vail, CO, USA	Downhill	3rd
1993	Feb 26, 1993	Veysonnaz, Switzerland	Downhill	2nd
1994	Jan 15, 1994	Cortina d'Ampezzo, Italy	Super-G	3rd

== World Championship results ==
Year	Age	Slalom	Giant slalom	Super-G	Downhill	Combined
1989	22	—	DNF	20	7	9
1991	24	—	24	16	7	DNF SL
1993	26	—	23	4	9	17

== Olympic results ==
Year	Age	Slalom	Giant slalom	Super-G	Downhill	Combined
1988	21	—	17	23	15	8
1992	25	—	—	6	1	DQ SL1
1994	27	—	—	8	19	—

== Video ==
- CBC interview – following her Olympic gold medal run, February 1992

== Personal ==
During May 2018, Lee-Gartner was part of a group of four female athletes, including Cassie Campbell, Jen Kish and Fran Rider to publicly pledge their brain to a Canadian research centre. The posthumous donation shall be made to Toronto Western Hospital’s Canadian Concussion Centre to further research on the effect of trauma on women's brains.
