= Mateja Svet =

Slovenian alpine skier

Personal information
- Born: 16 August 1968 (age 57) Ljubljana, SR Slovenia, Yugoslavia

Skiing career
- Sport: Alpine skiing
- Retired: 14 March 1990
- Disciplines: Super-G, giant slalom, slalom, combined
- World Cup debut: 15 January 1984

Olympics
- Medals: 1

World Championships
- Medals: 5 (1 gold)

World Cup
- Seasons: 7
- Wins: 7
- Podiums: 22
- Overall titles: 0
- Discipline titles: 1
Medal record
Women's alpine skiing
Representing Yugoslavia
World Cup race podiums
Event	1st	2nd	3rd
Slalom	1	3	1
Giant slalom	6	7	1
Super-G	0	1	2
Total	7	11	4
International competitions
Event	1st	2nd	3rd
Olympic Games	0	1	0
World Championships	1	1	3
Total	1	2	3
Olympic Games
Silver medal – second place	1988 Calgary	Slalom
World Championships
Gold medal – first place	1989 Vail	Slalom
Silver medal – second place	1987 Crans-Montana	Giant slalom
Bronze medal – third place	1987 Crans-Montana	Slalom
Bronze medal – third place	1987 Crans-Montana	Super-G
Bronze medal – third place	1989 Vail	Giant slalom

Mateja Svet; born 16 August 1968) is a Slovenian former alpine skier, who competed for Yugoslavia from 1984 to 1990.

== Biography ==
Svet was born in Ljubljana, Socialist Republic of Slovenia, Yugoslavia. Making her first appearance in the 1983/1984 season, she won the first Yugoslav female skiing victory in February 1986.

Svet won the World Cup giant slalom title in the 1987/1988 season, won silver medal in giant slalom in the 1988 Winter Olympics in Calgary, won three medals in 1987 World Championship in Crans-Montana (bronze in slalom and super-G, silver in giant slalom) and two medals in 1989 World Championship in Vail – gold in slalom. Later when the bronze medalist Christelle Guignard was disqualified due to doping, Svet also won bronze medal in giant slalom. In her rather short career – she quit at the age of 21 due to disagreements with the Ski Association of Yugoslavia – she achieved seven World Cup victories, 22 World Cup podiums and 54 World Cup top tens. From 1985 until 1990 she qualified no lower than 7th in the overall World Cup standings.

== World Cup results ==
=== Season titles ===
Season	Discipline
1988	Giant slalom

=== Season standings ===
Season	Age	Overall	Slalom	Giant slalom	Super-G	Downhill	Combined
1984	15	86	40	—	not awarded (w/ GS)	—	—
1985	16	31	30	18	not awarded (w/ GS)	—	—
1986	17	7	9	3	16	—	30
1987	18	7	9	6	11	—	—
1988	19	6	8	1	10	—	—
1989	20	6	8	2	—	—	13
1990	21	7	12	2	—	—	—

=== Race podiums ===
- 7 wins (6 GS, 1 SL)
- 22 podiums (14 GS, 5 SL, 3 SG)

Season	Date	Location	Discipline	Position
1985	13 March 1985	Lake Placid, United States	Giant slalom	2nd
1986	7 December 1985	Sestriere, Italy	Super-G	3rd
1986	26 January 1986	Saint-Gervais, France	Slalom	3rd
1986	5 February 1986	Val Zoldana, Italy	Giant slalom	2nd
1986	8 February 1986	Vysoke Tatry, Czechoslovakia	Giant slalom	1st
1986	22 March 1986	Bromont, Canada	Giant slalom	1st
1987	29 November 1986	Park City, United States	Giant slalom	2nd
1987	5 January 1987	Saalbach-Hinterglemm, Austria	Giant slalom	2nd
1987	6 January 1987	Saalbach-Hinterglemm, Austria	Super-G	3rd
1987	11 January 1987	Mellau, Austria	Slalom	2nd
1988	26 November 1987	Sestriere, Italy	Slalom	2nd
1988	28 November 1987	Sestriere, Italy	Super-G	2nd
1988	30 January 1988	(Socialist Federal Republic of Yugoslavia) Kranjska Gora, Yugoslavia	Giant slalom	1st
1988	31 January 1988	(Socialist Federal Republic of Yugoslavia) Kranjska Gora, Yugoslavia	Slalom	1st
1988	23 March 1988	Saalbach-Hinterglemm, Austria	Giant slalom	1st
1989	18 December 1988	Val Zoldana, Italy	Giant slalom	2nd
1989	8 January 1989	Mellau, Austria	Slalom	2nd
1989	4 March 1989	Furano, Japan	Giant slalom	2nd
1989	8 March 1989	Shigakogen, Japan	Giant slalom	2nd
1990	20 January 1990	(Socialist Federal Republic of Yugoslavia) Maribor, Yugoslavia	Giant slalom	1st
1990	5 February 1990	Veysonnaz, Switzerland	Giant slalom	1st
1990	14 March 1990	Klövsjö, Sweden	Giant slalom	3rd

== Olympic Games results ==
Season	Age	Slalom	Giant slalom	Super-G	Downhill	Combined
1984	15	15	—	not run	—	not run
1988	19	2	4	—	—	—

== World Championships results ==
Season	Age	Slalom	Giant slalom	Super-G	Downhill	Combined
1985	16	—	13	not run	—	—
1987	18	3	2	3	—	—
1989	20	1	3	—	—	4

Awards and achievements
Preceded by Monica Seles; Jasna Šekarić	(Socialist Federal Republic of Yugoslavia) Yugoslav Sportswoman of the Year; 1986, 1987; 1989	Succeeded by Jasna Šekarić; Monica Seles
Preceded by Veselin Vujović	(Socialist Federal Republic of Yugoslavia) The Best Athlete of Yugoslavia; 1987	Succeeded by Jasna Šekarić
