= Szafrański =

Szafrański ([ˌʂaˈfraɲski], feminine: Szafrańska, plural form: Szafrańscy) is a Polish surname. Notable people with the surname, sometimes Szafranski and Safranski, include:

- Eddie Safranski (1918–1974), American jazz double bassist, composer & arranger
- Katarzyna Szafrańska (born 1965), Polish alpine skier
- Kurt Szafranski, in exile Safranski, (1890–1964), German-American draftsman, journalist and managing director
- Krzysztof Szafrański (born 1972), former Polish racing cyclist
- Marcin Szafrański (born 1971), Polish alpine skier
- Rüdiger Safranski (born 1945), German philosopher and author
- Zbigniew Szafrański, Polish egyptologist
