= Pirker =

Pirker is a surname. Notable people with the surname include:

- Hubert Pirker (born 1948), Austrian politician and Member of the European Parliament
- Johanna Pirker (born 1988), Austrian computer scientist
- Pero Pirker (1927–1972), Croatian and Yugoslav politician
- Thomas Pirker (born 1987), Austrian footballer

== See also ==
- Pirkner
- Parker (surname)
