= Kristjánsdóttir =

Kristjánsdóttir is an Icelandic patronymic meaning "daughter of Kristján". In Icelandic names, this is not a family name. Notable people with the name include:

- Anna Björk Kristjánsdóttir (born 1989), Icelandic footballer
- Dagný Linda Kristjánsdóttir (born 1980), Icelandic alpine skier
- Eva Margrét Kristjánsdóttir (born 1997), Icelandic basketball player
- Guðrún Kristjánsdóttir (born 1967), Icelandic alpine skier
- Halla Signý Kristjánsdóttir (born 1964), Icelandic politician
- Hanna Birna Kristjánsdóttir (born 1966), Icelandic minister
- Ilmur Kristjánsdóttir (born 1978), Icelandic actress
- Kolbrún Ýr Kristjánsdóttir (born 1982), Icelandic swimmer
- Þórunn Arna Kristjánsdóttir (born 1983), Icelandic actress
