= Javier Rivara =

Argentine alpine skier (born 1970)

Personal information
- Nationality: Argentine
- Born: 30 June 1970 (age 54)

Sport
- Sport: Alpine skiing

Javier Rivara (born 30 June 1970) is an Argentine alpine skier. He competed in five events at the 1988 Winter Olympics.
