= Beth Madsen =

American alpine skier (born 1964)

Beth Madsen (born March 12, 1964, in Aspen, Colorado) is an American former alpine skier. She competed in the women's slalom and women's combined events at the 1988 Winter Olympics.
