= Nina Ehrnrooth =

Finnish alpine skier (born 1962)

Nina Katarina Ehrnrooth (born 9 April 1962 in Helsinki) is a Finnish retired alpine skier who competed in the women's slalom and women's giant slalom at the 1988 Winter Olympics.
