= Anita Wachter =

Austrian alpine skier

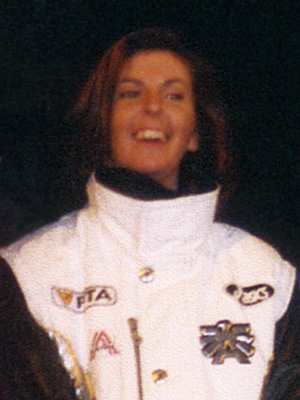
- Wachter in December 1996

Personal information
- Born: 12 February 1967 (age 59) Bartholomäberg, Montafon, Vorarlberg, Austria
- Height: 1.64 m (5 ft 5 in)

Skiing career
- Sport: Alpine skiing ♀
- Club: WSV Tschagguns
- Retired: March 2001 (age 34)
- Disciplines: Giant slalom, slalom, combined, super-G, downhill
- World Cup debut: 17 March 1985 (age 18) (first top 15)

Olympics
- Teams: 3 – (1988, 1992, 1994)
- Medals: 3 (1 gold)

World Championships
- Teams: 8 – (1987–2001)
- Medals: 5 (0 gold)

World Cup
- Seasons: 16 – (1986–2001)
- Wins: 19 – (14 GS, 2 SG, 1 SL, 2 K)
- Podiums: 76
- Overall titles: 1 – (1993)
- Discipline titles: 2 – (2 SG; 1990, 1994)
Medal record
Women's alpine skiing
Representing Austria
World Cup race podiums
Event	1st	2nd	3rd
Slalom	1	4	4
Giant slalom	14	21	10
Super-G	2	5	7
Combined	2	2	3
Total	19	32	24
International competitions
Event	1st	2nd	3rd
Olympic Games	1	2	0
World Championships	0	2	3
World Junior Championships	2	1	0
Total	3	5	3
Olympic Games
Gold medal – first place	1988 Calgary	Combined
Silver medal – second place	1992 Albertville	Combined
Silver medal – second place	1992 Albertville	Giant slalom
World Championships
Silver medal – second place	1993 Morioka	Giant slalom
Silver medal – second place	1996 Sierra Nevada	Combined
Bronze medal – third place	1991 Saalbach	Super G
Bronze medal – third place	1993 Morioka	Combined
Bronze medal – third place	1999 Vail	Giant slalom
Junior World Ski Championships
Gold medal – first place	1985 Jasná	Giant Slalom
Gold medal – first place	1985 Jasná	Slalom
Silver medal – second place	1985 Jasná	Combined

Anita Wachter (born 12 February 1967) is a former World Cup alpine ski racer and Olympic gold medalist from Austria. She focused on the technical events and specialized in giant slalom.

== Biography ==
Born in Bartholomäberg, Montafon, Vorarlberg, Wachter won the World Cup overall title in 1993, and the giant slalom title twice (1990 and 1994). She was the gold medalist in the combined at the 1988 Winter Olympics, and won two silver medals in 1992 (combined and giant slalom). Wachter also won five medals at the World Championships; she represented Austria in three Olympics, twice also as flag bearer (1992 and 1994) and eight World Championships.

Wachter retired from competition after the 2001 season with 19 World Cup wins (14 Giant slalom, 2 Super G, 1 Slalom, 2 Combined), attained 76 podiums, and had 175 top ten finishes. She is living together with her longtime companion Rainer Salzgeber; they have two daughters.

== World Cup results ==
=== Season standings ===
Season	Age	Overall	Slalom	Giant Slalom	Super G	Downhill	Combined
1985	18	89	—	44	—	—	—
1986	19	17	40	8	7	—	15
1987	20	14	14	21	5	23	—
1988	21	3	3	4	11	28	2
1989	22	5	7	5	3	—	—
1990	23	2	5	1	8	—	1
1991	24	6	14	2	11	—	9
1992	25	12	15	9	27	52	3
1993	26	1	4	2	4	19	1
1994	27	4	9	1	9	—	7
1995	28	8	16	7	14	31	—
1996	29	3	9	3	8	17	1
1997	30	7	11	3	24	32	3
1998	31	27	27	15	39	—	12
1999	32	8	18	2	—	—	—
2000	33	16	26	3	—	—	—
2001	34	51	26	29	—	—	—

=== Season titles ===
- 1 Overall, 2 Giant slalom

Season	Discipline
1990	Giant slalom
1993	Overall
1994	Giant slalom

=== Race victories ===
- 19 wins: (14 Giant slalom, 2 Super G, 1 Slalom, 2 Combined)
- 76 podiums

Season	Date	Location	Discipline
1988	30 Nov 1987	Courmayeur, Italy	Slalom
1990	9 Aug 1989	Las Leñas, Argentina	Super G
1990	3 Dec 1989	(United States) Vail, USA	Giant slalom
1991	10 Feb 1991	Zwiesel, Germany	Giant slalom
1993	5 Dec 1992	(United States) Steamboat Springs, USA	Giant slalom
1993	17 Jan 1993	Cortina d'Ampezzo, Italy	Combined
1994	31 Oct 1993	Sölden, Austria	Giant slalom
1994	26 Nov 1993	Santa Caterina, Italy	Giant slalom
1994	16 Jan 1994	Cortina d'Ampezzo, Italy	Giant slalom
1995	7 Jan 1995	Haus im Ennstal, Austria	Super G
1995	23 Jan 1995	Cortina d'Ampezzo, Italy	Giant slalom
1995	18 Feb 1995	Åre, Sweden	Giant slalom
1996	17 Dec 1995	St. Anton, Austria	Combined
1996	31 Jan 1996	Cortina d'Ampezzo, Italy	Giant slalom
1999	27 Dec 1998	Semmering, Austria	Giant slalom
1999	2 Jan 1999	Maribor, Slovenia	Giant slalom
1999	24 Feb 1999	Åre, Sweden	Giant slalom
1999	13 Mar 1999	Sierra Nevada, Spain	Giant slalom
2000	28 Dec 1999	Lienz, Austria	Giant slalom

== World Championship results ==
Year	Age	Slalom	Giant Slalom	Super G	Downhill	Combined
1987	20	—	—	—	—	5
1989	22	—	13	9	—	5
1991	24	12	11	3	—	—
1993	26	—	2	6	—	3
1996	29	DNF1	4	16	—	2
1997	30	22	4	—	—	10
1999	32	9	3	—	—	—
2001	34	—	DNF1	—	—	—

== Olympic results ==
Year	Age	Slalom	Giant Slalom	Super G	Downhill	Combined
1988	20	—	7	5	—	1
1992	24	—	2	9	—	2
1994	26	—	4	9	—	—
1998	30	—	—	—	—	—

Awards and achievements
Preceded by (Austria) Petra Kronberger	Austrian Sportswoman of the year 1993	Succeeded by (Austria) Emese Hunyady
