= Yugoslavia at the 1988 Winter Olympics =

- Flag of SFR Yugoslavia
- IOC code: YUG
- NOC: Yugoslav Olympic Committee

in Calgary
- Competitors: 22 (16 men, 6 women) in 7 sports
- Flag bearer: Bojan Križaj
- Medals Ranked 14th: Gold 0 Silver 2 Bronze 1 Total 3

Winter Olympics appearances (overview)
- 1924; 1928; 1932; 1936; 1948; 1952; 1956; 1960; 1964; 1968; 1972; 1976; 1980; 1984; 1988; 1992; 1994; 1998; 2002

Other related appearances
- Croatia (1992–); Slovenia (1992–); Bosnia and Herzegovina (1994–); North Macedonia (1998–); Serbia and Montenegro (1998–2006); Montenegro (2010–); Serbia (2010–); Kosovo (2018–)

Athletes from the Socialist Federal Republic of Yugoslavia competed at the 1988 Winter Olympics in Calgary, Canada.

== Medalists ==
Medal	Name	Sport	Event	Date
Silver	Matjaž Debelak; Miran Tepeš; Primož Ulaga; Matjaž Zupan	Ski jumping	Large hill team	24 February
Silver	Mateja Svet	Alpine skiing	Women's slalom	26 February
Bronze	Matjaž Debelak	Ski jumping	Large hill individual	23 February

== Competitors ==
The following is the list of number of competitors in the Games.

Sport	Men	Women	Total
Alpine skiing	5	4	9
Biathlon	1	–	1
Bobsleigh	2	–	2
Cross-country skiing	2	0	2
Figure skating	0	1	1
Ski jumping	5	–	5
Speed skating	1	1	2
Total	16	6	22

== Alpine skiing ==
Men

Athlete	Event	Race 1	Race 2	Total	
Athlete	Event	Time	Time	Time	Rank
Klemen Bergant	Super-G			1:43.41	16
Tomaž Čižman	Super-G			1:42.47	9
Robert Žan	Giant Slalom	1:07.67	1:04.51	2:12.18	23
Klemen Bergant	Giant Slalom	1:07.16	1:03.88	2:11.04	15
Rok Petrovič	Giant Slalom	1:06.31	1:03.01	2:09.32	9
Tomaž Čižman	Giant Slalom	1:06.16	DNF	DNF	–
Klemen Bergant	Slalom	DNF	–	DNF	–
Robert Žan	Slalom	DNF	–	DNF	–
Rok Petrovič	Slalom	53.05	48.58	1:41.63	11
Grega Benedik	Slalom	52.34	49.04	1:41.38	9

Women

Athlete	Event	Race 1	Race 2	Total	
Athlete	Event	Time	Time	Time	Rank
Veronika Šarec	Super-G			1:23.17	27
Mateja Svet	Super-G			1:21.96	20
Mojca Dežman	Giant Slalom	1:04.12	1:10.24	2:14.36	18
Katra Zajc	Giant Slalom	1:02.87	1:09.61	2:12.48	15
Veronika Šarec	Giant Slalom	1:02.73	DNF	DNF	–
Mateja Svet	Giant Slalom	1:00.95	1:06.85	2:07.80	4
Veronika Šarec	Slalom	DNF	–	DNF	–
Katra Zajc	Slalom	51.06	DNF	DNF	–
Mojca Dežman	Slalom	50.86	49.35	1:40.21	9
Mateja Svet	Slalom	49.21	49.16	1:38.37	2nd place, silver medalist(s)

== Biathlon ==
Men

Event	Athlete	Misses ^{1}	Time	Rank
10 km Sprint	Jure Velepec	2	28:21.9	53

Event	Athlete	Time	Misses	Adjusted time ^{2}	Rank
20 km	Jure Velepec	59:15.6	4	1'03:15.6	35

^{1} A penalty loop of 150 metres had to be skied per missed target.
^{2} One minute added per missed target.

== Bobsleigh ==
Sled	Athletes	Event	Run 1		Run 2		Run 3		Run 4		Total	
Sled	Athletes	Event	Time	Rank	Time	Rank	Time	Rank	Time	Rank	Time	Rank
YUG-1	Borislav Vujadinović; Miro Pandurević	Two-man	59.63	31	1:00.70	25	1:02.28	35	1:00.89	26	4:03.50	28

== Cross-country skiing ==
Men

Event	Athlete	Race	
Event	Athlete	Time	Rank
15 km C	Sašo Grajf	46:12.3	44
15 km C	Janež Kršinar	45:54.8	39
30 km C	Sašo Grajf	1'36:19.2	53
30 km C	Janež Kršinar	1'32:02.1	34
50 km F	Sašo Grajf	2'23:47.1	52
50 km F	Janež Kršinar	2'12:33.5	30

C = Classical style, F = Freestyle

== Figure skating ==
Women

Athlete	CF	SP	FS	TFP	Rank
Željka Čižmešija	20	25	22	44.0	22

== Ski jumping ==
Athlete	Event	Jump 1		Jump 2		Total	
Athlete	Event	Distance	Points	Distance	Points	Points	Rank
Matjaž Zupan	Normal hill	83.5	100.2	78.0	87.4	190.0	16
Rajko Lotrič	Normal hill	85.0	105.6	74.0	74.5	180.1	26
Primož Ulaga	Normal hill	84.5	105.8	72.0	71.3	177.1	30
Miran Tepeš	Normal hill	84.0	106.0	83.5	105.2	211.2	4
Primož Ulaga	Large hill	94.5	72.2	101.0	88.0	161.0	40
Miran Tepeš	Large hill	105.0	98.4	102.5	96.4	194.8	10
Matjaž Debelak	Large hill	113.0	107.6	108.0	100.1	207.7	3rd place, bronze medalist(s)
Matjaž Zupan	Large hill	111.5	110.0	98.5	85.8	195.8	9

Men's team large hill

Athletes	Result	
Athletes	Points ^{1}	Rank
Primož Ulaga; Matjaž Zupan; Matjaž Debelak; Miran Tepeš	625.5	2nd place, silver medalist(s)

^{1} Four teams members performed two jumps each. The best three were counted.

== Speed skating ==
Men

Event	Athlete	Race	
Event	Athlete	Time	Rank
500 m	Behudin Merdović	56.21	35
1000 m	Behudin Merdović	1:23.88	35
1500 m	Behudin Merdović	2:06.11	39

Women

Event	Athlete	Race	
Event	Athlete	Time	Rank
500 m	Bibija Kerla	44.47	30
1000 m	Bibija Kerla	1:30.89	26
1500 m	Bibija Kerla	2:21.69	28
