= Guðrún Kristjánsdóttir =

Icelandic alpine skier (born 1967)

Personal information
- Nationality: Icelandic
- Born: 25 November 1967 (age 57)

Sport
- Sport: Alpine skiing

Guðrún Kristjánsdóttir (born 25 November 1967) is an Icelandic alpine skier. She competed in the women's giant slalom at the 1988 Winter Olympics.
