= Pirkner =

Pirkner is a surname that occurs mainly in Austria. Notable people with the surname include:

- Hans Pirkner (1946–2025), Austrian football player
- Jos Pirkner (born 1927 - 11 March 2026), Austrian sculptor

== See also ==
- Birkner, people bearing that surname
