= Claudina Rossel =

Andorran alpine skier (born 1969)

Personal information
- Full name: Claudina Rossel Badia
- Nationality: Andorran
- Born: 12 July 1969 (age 55)

Sport
- Country: Andorra
- Sport: Alpine skiing

Claudina Rossel Badia (Note: In this Catalan name, the first or paternal surname is Rossel and the second or maternal family name is Badia; both are generally joined by the conjunction "i".) (born 12 July 1969) is an Andorran alpine skier. She competed in two events at the 1988 Winter Olympics. She was the first woman to represent Andorra at the Olympics.
