= Spain at the 1988 Winter Olympics =

- IOC code: ESP
- NOC: Spanish Olympic Committee
- Website: www.coe.es (in Spanish)

in Calgary
- Competitors: 12 (7 men, 5 women) in 5 sports
- Flag bearer: Ainhoa Ibarra
- Medals: Gold 0 Silver 0 Bronze 0 Total 0

Winter Olympics appearances (overview)
- 1936; 1948; 1952; 1956; 1960; 1964; 1968; 1972; 1976; 1980; 1984; 1988; 1992; 1994; 1998; 2002; 2006; 2010; 2014; 2018; 2022; 2026

Spain competed at the 1988 Winter Olympics in Calgary, Alberta, Canada.

== Competitors ==
The following is the list of number of competitors in the Games.

Sport	Men	Women	Total
Alpine skiing	3	3	6
Cross-country skiing	2	1	3
Figure skating	0	1	1
Luge	1	0	1
Ski jumping	1	–	1
Total	7	5	12

== Alpine skiing ==
Men

Athlete	Event	Race 1	Race 2	Total	
Athlete	Event	Time	Time	Time	Rank
Luis Fernández Ochoa	Super-G			DNF	–
Delfin Campo	Super-G			DNF	–
Jorge Pujol	Super-G			1:49.33	36
Luis Fernández Ochoa	Giant Slalom	DNF	–	DNF	–
Delfin Campo	Giant Slalom	1:11.68	1:08.50	2:20.18	39
Jorge Pujol	Giant Slalom	1:11.31	1:08.16	2:19.47	37
Delfin Campo	Slalom	DNF	–	DNF	–
Jorge Pujol	Slalom	DNF	–	DNF	–
Luis Fernández Ochoa	Slalom	56.85	53.18	1:50.03	18

Women

Athlete	Event	Race 1	Race 2	Total	
Athlete	Event	Time	Time	Time	Rank
Ainhoa Ibarra	Super-G			1:24.70	33
Blanca Fernández Ochoa	Super-G			1:22.04	21
Eva Moga	Giant Slalom	DNF	–	DNF	–
Ainhoa Ibarra	Giant Slalom	DNF	–	DNF	–
Blanca Fernández Ochoa	Giant Slalom	59.68	DNF	DNF	–
Eva Moga	Slalom	52.79	DNF	DNF	–
Blanca Fernández Ochoa	Slalom	49.89	49.55	1:39.44	5

== Cross-country skiing ==
Men

Event	Athlete	Race	
Event	Athlete	Time	Rank
15 km C	José Giro	48:54.2	63
15 km C	Jordi Ribó	48:40.7	61
30 km C	Jordi Ribó	DNF	–
30 km C	José Giro	1'38:01.5	59
50 km F	José Giro	2'27:05.8	58
50 km F	Jordi Ribó	2'24:10.4	53

C = Classical style, F = Freestyle

Women

Event	Athlete	Race	
Event	Athlete	Time	Rank
5 km C	Piroska Abos	17:41.6	49
10 km C	Piroska Abos	35:17.8	46
20 km F	Piroska Abos	1'07:33.1	49

C = Classical style, F = Freestyle

== Figure skating ==
Women

Athlete	CF	SP	FS	TFP	Rank
Yvonne Gómez	17	19	17	34.8	18

== Luge ==
Men

Athlete	Run 1		Run 2		Run 3		Run 4		Total	
Athlete	Time	Rank	Time	Rank	Time	Rank	Time	Rank	Time	Rank
Pablo García	48.702	31	47.953	29	48.708	29	48.115	25	3:13.478	29

== Ski jumping ==
Athlete	Event	Jump 1		Jump 2		Total	
Athlete	Event	Distance	Points	Distance	Points	Points	Rank
Bernat Sola	Normal hill	71.0	73.2	68.5	67.2	140.4	57
Bernat Sola	Large hill	96.5	78.5	86.0	60.8	139.3	51
