= Julio Moreschi =

Argentine cross-country skier (born 1963)

Personal information
- Born: 22 September 1963 (age 61); Bariloche, Argentina

Sport
- Sport: Cross-country skiing

Julio Moreschi (born 22 September 1963) is an Argentine cross-country skier. He competed at the 1984 Winter Olympics and the 1988 Winter Olympics.
