= Birkner, Illinois =

Birkner
- Populated Area
- Location within Illinois
- Coordinates: 38.562°N 90.029°W
- Country: United States
- State: Illinois
- County: St. Clair
- Elevation: 505 ft (154 m)
- Time zone: UTC-6 (Central Time Zone)
- GNIS feature ID: 426271

Birkner is a populated area in St. Clair County, Illinois. It is located at 38.562°N 90.029°W. A mine of the same name operated from prior to 1882 to 1889. During that time, the mine was operated by Edward Avery & Company, Dutch Hollow Coal Company, and the Consolidated Coal Company of St. Louis.

Birkner can be seen on the French Village U.S. Geological Survey Map.
