= Ignacio Birkner =

Argentine alpine skier (born 1971)

Personal information
- Born: 25 April 1971 (age 54) San Carlos de Bariloche, Argentina

Sport
- Sport: Alpine skiing

Ignacio Birkner (born 25 April 1971) is an Argentine alpine skier. He competed in three events at the 1988 Winter Olympics. He is the brother of Magdalena Birkner, Carolina Birkner, and Jorge Birkner.
