= Sandra Grau =

Andorran alpine skier (born 1970)

Personal information
- Full name: Sandra Grau Muxella
- Born: 27 April 1970 (age 54); Sant Julià de Lòria, Andorra

Sport
- Country: Andorra
- Sport: Alpine skiing

Sandra Grau Muxella (Note: In this Catalan name, the first or paternal surname is Grau and the second or maternal family name is Muxella; both are generally joined by the conjunction "i".) (born 27 April 1970) is an Andorran alpine skier. She competed in three events at the 1988 Winter Olympics.

She is the sister of alpine skier Vicky Grau.
