= Francisco Saubidet =

Argentine windsurfer

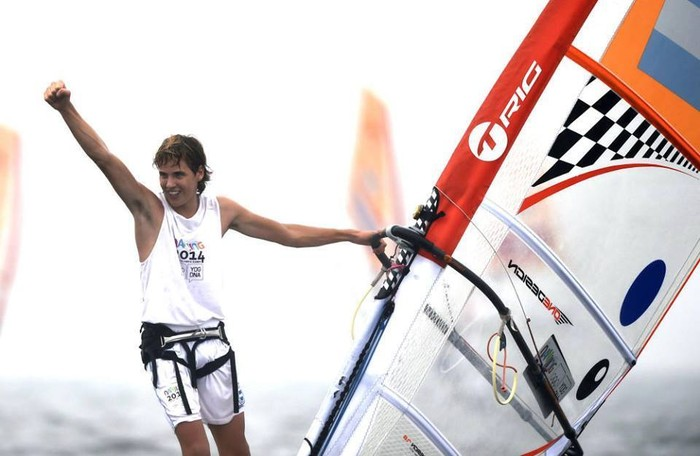
- Saubidet at the 2014 Summer Youth Olympics

Personal information
- Full name: Francisco Cruz Saubidet Birkner
- Born: 5 October 1998 (age 27) Buenos Aires, Argentina

Sport
- Sport: Sailing

Francisco Cruz Saubidet Birkner (Note: In this Spanish name, the first or paternal surname is Saubidet and the second or maternal family name is Birkner.) (born 5 October 1998) is an Argentine sport sailor. He competed in the 2020 Summer Olympics. His brother Bautista Saubidet Birkner is also an Olympic Athlete. He is the son of Magdalena Birkner.
