= Bautista Saubidet Birkner =

Argentine windsurfer

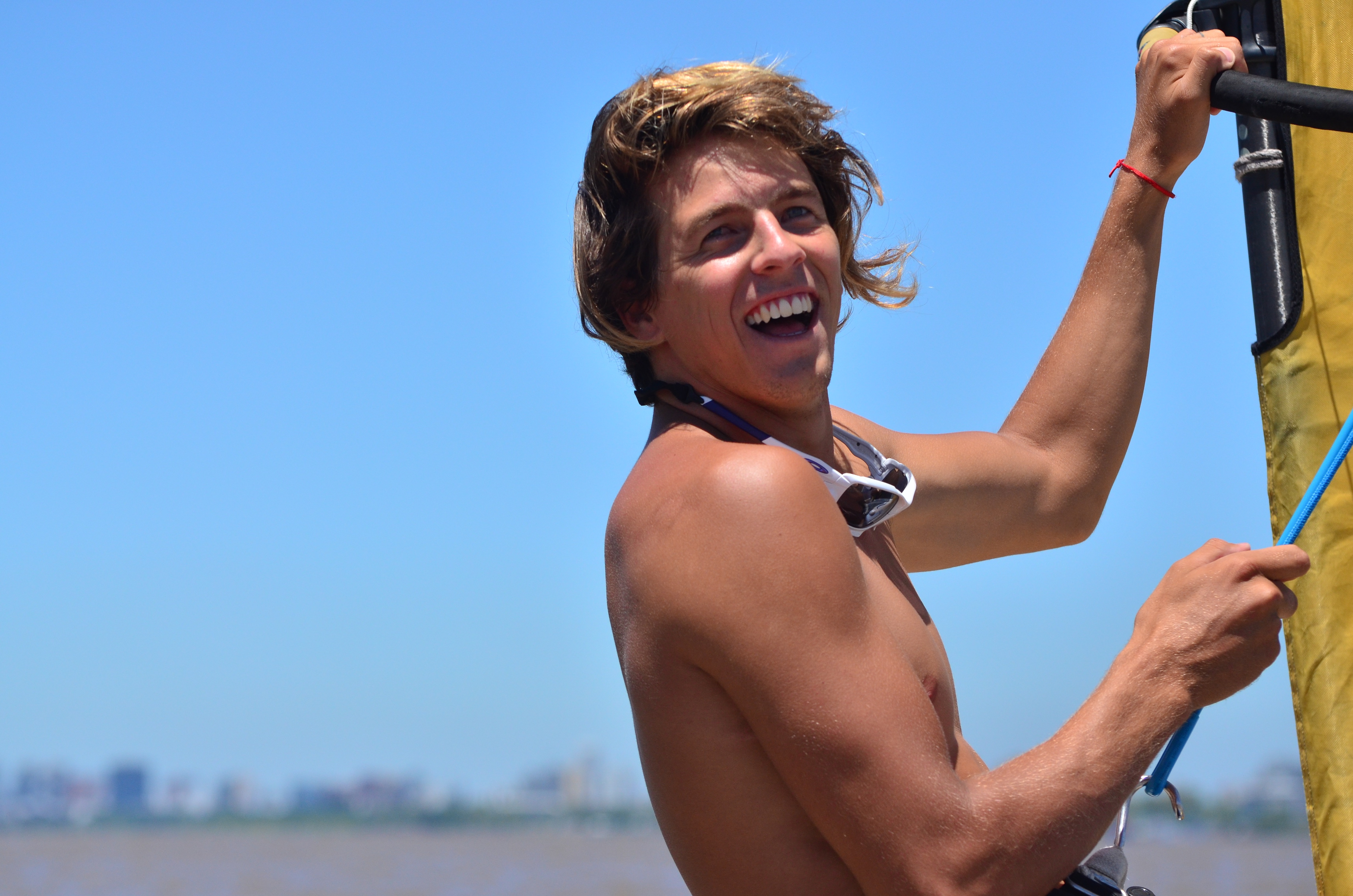
- 2017

Personal information
- Full name: Bautista Saubidet Birkner
- Nationality: Argentine
- Born: 28 November 1995 (age 30)
- Height: 180 cm (5 ft 11 in)

Sailing career
- Sport: Sailing
Medal record
Men's sailing
Representing Argentina
Pan American Games
Gold medal – first place	2019 Lima	RS:X

Bautista Saubidet Birkner (born 28 November 1995) is an Argentine sailor. He participated in the men's RS:X event at the 2016 Summer Olympics. He also won the Pan American gold medal in the RS:X event at the 2019 Lima. He is 3 times South American Champion and Youth European Champion.

He started windsurfing at the age of 11. His brother Francisco Saubidet Birkner is also an Olympic Athlete. He is the son of Magdalena Birkner.
