= Sarah Lewis (alpine skier) =

British alpine skier (born 1964)

Sarah Lewis OBE OLY (born 29 November 1964 in London) is a British former alpine skier who competed in the 1988 Winter Olympics. She was the Secretary General of FIS for 20 years until she was removed in October 2020.

She was awarded the Femme en or prize in 2006, and OBE in 2018, for heading up the largest Winter Sports International Governing Body.
