= Katarzyna Szafrańska =

Polish alpine skier (born 1965)

Personal information
- Nationality: Polish
- Born: 10 July 1965 (age 59); Nowy Sącz, Poland

Sport
- Sport: Alpine skiing

Katarzyna Szafrańska (born 10 July 1965) is a Polish alpine skier. She competed in two events at the 1988 Winter Olympics.
