= Fiamma Smith =

Guatemalan alpine skier (born 1962)

Personal information
- Nationality: Guatemalan
- Born: 23 April 1962 (age 64)

Sport
- Sport: Alpine skiing

Fiamma Smith (born 23 April 1962) is a Guatemalan alpine skier. She competed in three events at the 1988 Winter Olympics.
