= Eva Moga =

Spanish alpine skier (born 1968)

Eva Moga (born 25 July 1968) is a Spanish former alpine skier who competed in the 1988 Winter Olympics.
