= Jorge Birkner =

Argentine alpine skier (born 1964)

Personal information
- Born: 18 August 1964 (age 61) Buenos Aires, Argentina

Sport
- Sport: Alpine skiing

Jorge Birkner (born 18 August 1964) is an Argentine alpine skier. He competed at the 1984 Winter Olympics and the 1988 Winter Olympics. He is the brother of Magdalena Birkner, Carolina Birkner, and Ignacio Birkner.
