= Mariela Vallecillo =

Argentine alpine skier (born 1970)

Personal information
- Nationality: Argentine
- Born: 23 August 1970 (age 56)

Sport
- Sport: Alpine skiing

Mariela Vallecillo (born 23 August 1970) is an Argentine alpine skier. She competed in three events at the 1988 Winter Olympics.
