= Mojca Dežman =

Slovenian alpine skier (born 1967)

Mojca Dežman (born 14 May 1967 in Kranj) is a Slovenian former alpine skier who competed for Yugoslavia in the 1988 Winter Olympics.

She placed #18 in the Giant Slalom event and #9 in the Slalom event.
