= Wendy Lumby =

British alpine skier (born 1966)

Wendy Lumby (born 13 June 1966 in Regina, Saskatchewan) is a Canadian former alpine skier who competed in the 1988 Winter Olympics. She grew up in Calgary, Alberta.
