= Lenka Kebrlová =

Czech alpine skier (born 1966)

Lenka Kebrlová (born 13 March 1966, in Rakovník) is a Czech former alpine skier who competed for Czechoslovakia in the 1988 Winter Olympics.
