= Magdalena Birkner =

Argentine alpine skier (born 1966)

Personal information
- Born: 18 January 1966 (age 59) Buenos Aires, Argentina

Sport
- Sport: Alpine skiing

Magdalena Birkner (born 18 January 1966) is an Argentine alpine skier. She competed at the 1984 Winter Olympics and the 1988 Winter Olympics.

She is the sister of Ignacio Birkner, Carolina Birkner, and Jorge Birkner. She is the mother of Francisco Saubidet and Bautista Saubidet Birkner.
