= Jacqueline Vogt =

Liechtenstein alpine skier (born 1969)

Jacqueline Vogt (born 7 March 1969) is a Liechtensteiner former alpine skier who competed in the 1988 Winter Olympics.
