= Michelle Ruthven =

Canadian alpine skier (born 1967)

Personal information
- Born: Michelle McKendry; 18 June 1967 (age 59) Orangeville, Ontario, Canada
- Height: 165 cm (5 ft 5 in)
- Weight: 61 kg (134 lb)

Sport
- Sport: Skiing
- Club: Lorretto Ski Club
Medal record
Women's alpine skiing
Representing Canada
Winter Pan American Games
Bronze medal – third place	1990 Las Leñas	Giant slalom

Michelle Ruthven (née McKendry, born 18 June 1967) is a Canadian former alpine skier who competed in the 1988 Winter Olympics, 1992 Winter Olympics, and 1994 Winter Olympics.

In the January 1994 World Cup downhill in Garmisch-Partenkirchen, Germany, Ruthven came in third in a race where skier Ulrike Maier died.
