= Carolina Birkner =

Argentine alpine skier (born 1971)

Personal information
- Born: 25 April 1971 (age 55) San Carlos de Bariloche, Argentina

Sport
- Sport: Alpine skiing

Carolina Birkner (born 25 April 1971) is an Argentine alpine skier. She competed in four events at the 1988 Winter Olympics.

She is the sister of Ignacio Birkner, Magdalena Birkner, and Jorge Birkner.
