= Astrid Steverlynck =

Argentine alpine skier (born 1968)

Personal information
- Nationality: Argentine
- Born: 24 February 1968 (age 58)

Sport
- Sport: Alpine skiing

Astrid Steverlynck (born 24 February 1968) is an Argentine alpine skier. She competed at the 1988 Winter Olympics and the 1992 Winter Olympics.
