= Emi Kawabata =

Japanese alpine skier (born 1970)

Personal information
- Nationality: Japanese
- Born: 13 February 1970 (age 56)

Sport
- Sport: Alpine skiing

Emi Kawabata (川端 絵美, Kawabata Emi; born 13 February 1970) is a Japanese skier. She competed in Alpine skiing at the 1988, 1992 and the 1994 Winter Olympics. She is the only female Japanese skier to finish on the podium of an Alpine World Cup race, placing third in a downhill race at St. Anton, Austria, on 18 December 1993.
