= Sachiko Yamamoto =

Japanese alpine skier (born 1970)

Personal information
- Born: 5 April 1970 (age 56) Nagano, Japan

Sport
- Country: Japan
- Sport: Alpine skiing
Medal record
Asian Winter Games
Gold medal – first place	1990 Sapporo	Giant slalom
Silver medal – second place	1990 Sapporo	Slalom

Sachiko Yamamoto (山本 さち子, Yamamoto Sachiko; born 5 April 1970) is a Japanese alpine skier.

She competed at the 1990 Asian Winter Games where she won a gold medal in the giant slalom event and a silver in the Slalom event. She also competed at the 1988 Winter Olympics and the 1992 Winter Olympics.
