= Mihaela Fera =

Romanian alpine skier (born 1970)

Personal information
- Nationality: Romanian
- Born: 6 August 1970 (age 56) Sibiu, Romania

Sport
- Sport: Alpine skiing

Mihaela Fera (born 6 August 1970) is a Romanian alpine skier. She competed at the 1988, 1992 and the 1994 Winter Olympics.
