= Lucia Medzihradská =

Slovak alpine skier (born 1968)

- Born: 14 November 1968 (age 57); Brezno, Czechoslovakia
- Occupation: Alpine skier

Lucia Medzihradská (born 14 November 1968) is a Slovak former alpine skier who competed for Czechoslovakia in the 1988 Winter Olympics, 1992 Winter Olympics, and for Slovakia at the 1994 Winter Olympics. She studied Theory of Culture and Fine Art and is a photographer and graphic designer. She is also an artist with works on display with the Art of the Olympians.
