= Carolina Eiras =

Argentine alpine skier (born 1969)

Personal information
- Nationality: Argentine
- Born: 3 March 1969 (age 57)

Sport
- Sport: Alpine skiing

Carolina Eiras (born 3 March 1969) is an Argentine alpine skier. She competed at the 1988 Winter Olympics and the 1992 Winter Olympics.
