= Ľudmila Milanová =

Slovak alpine skier (born 1967)

Ľudmila Milanová (born 22 March 1967 in Kežmarok) is a Slovak former alpine skier who competed for Czechoslovakia in the 1988 Winter Olympics and 1992 Winter Olympics.
