= Alpine skiing at the 1988 Winter Olympics =

Alpine skiing at the XV Olympic Winter Games
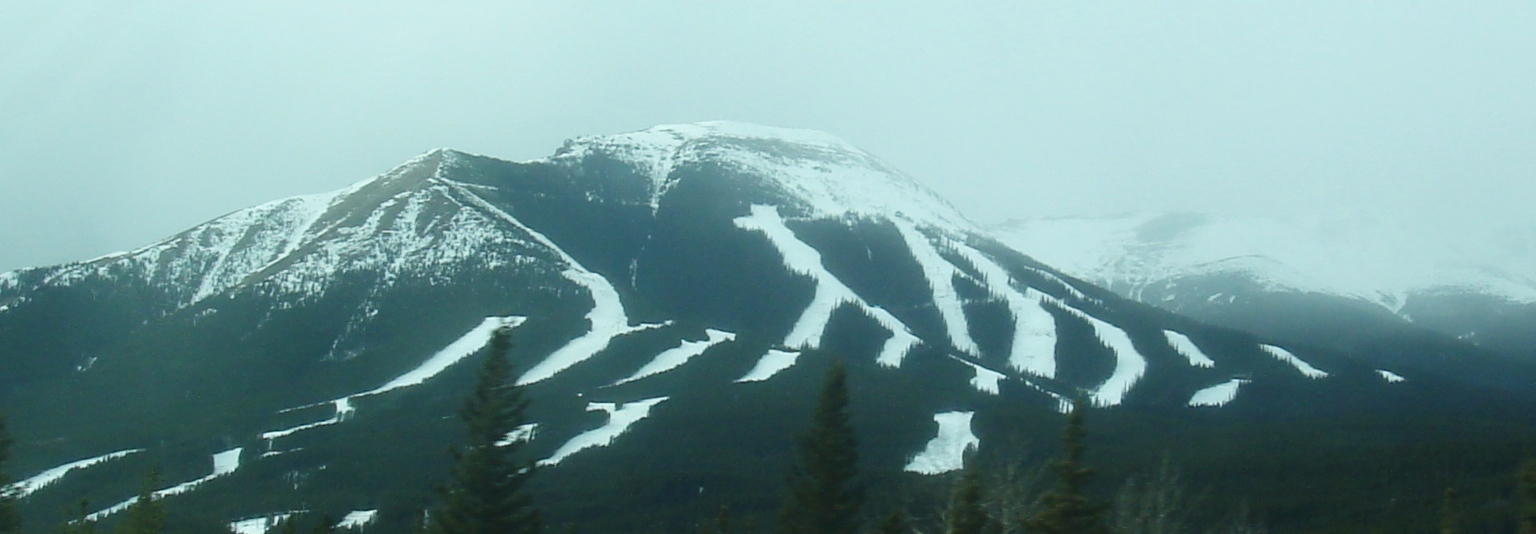
- Nakiska on Mount Allan
- Venue: Nakiska; Kananaskis Country, Alberta, Canada
- Dates: February 15–27, 1988
- No. of events: 10
- Competitors: 271 from 43 nations

Location in Canada
Locations in Alberta

Alpine skiing at the 1988 Winter Olympics consisted of ten alpine skiing events, held February 15–27 at Nakiska on Mount Allan, a new ski area west of Calgary.

These Olympics featured the first change in the alpine skiing program in more than 30 years. The Super-G was added and the combined event returned; it was last contested at the Winter Olympics in 1948, prior to the addition of the giant slalom.

== Background ==
On February 25, 1988, 47 year old Austrian Olympic Team physician Joerg Oberhammer died after falling into the path of a snow-grooming machine after colliding with another skier between runs of the men's giant slalom. Swiss team skiers Pirmin Zurbriggen and Martin Hangl witnessed Oberhammer's death from the chairlift, Zurbriggen went on to win the bronze medal, while Hangl withdrew from the giant slalom due to the incident.

A total of 14 competitors, including the entire Canadian team was disqualified from the event after organizers became aware their ski suits were not previously approved by the International Ski Federation.

== Medal summary ==
Nine nations won medals in alpine skiing, as Switzerland led the medal table with eleven (three gold, four silver, and four bronze), followed by Austria with six. Vreni Schneider of Switzerland and Alberto Tomba of Italy shared the lead in the individual medal table with two gold medals each.

=== Medal table ===
Rank	Nation	Gold	Silver	Bronze	Total
1	Switzerland	3	4	4	11
2	Austria	3	3	0	6
3	Italy	2	0	0	2
4	West Germany	1	2	1	4
5	France	1	0	1	2
6	Yugoslavia	0	1	0	1
7	Canada	0	0	2	2
8	Liechtenstein	0	0	1	1
8	Sweden	0	0	1	1
Totals (9 entries)		10	10	10	30

=== Men's events ===
Event	Gold		Silver		Bronze	
Downhill	Pirmin Zurbriggen; Switzerland	1:59.63	Peter Müller; Switzerland	2:00.14	Franck Piccard; France	2:01.24
Super-G	Franck Piccard; France	1:39.66	Helmut Mayer; Austria	1:40.96	Lars-Börje Eriksson; Sweden	1:41.08
Giant slalom	Alberto Tomba; Italy	2:06.37	Hubert Strolz; Austria	2:07.41	Pirmin Zurbriggen; Switzerland	2:08.39
Slalom	Alberto Tomba; Italy	1:39.47	Frank Wörndl; West Germany	1:39.53	Paul Frommelt; Liechtenstein	1:39.84
Combined	Hubert Strolz; Austria	36.55	Bernhard Gstrein; Austria	43.45	Paul Accola; Switzerland	48.24

=== Women's events ===
Event	Gold		Silver		Bronze	
Downhill	Marina Kiehl; West Germany	1:25.86	Brigitte Oertli; Switzerland	1:26.61	Karen Percy; Canada	1:26.62
Super-G	Sigrid Wolf; Austria	1:19.03	Michela Figini; Switzerland	1:20.03	Karen Percy; Canada	1:20.29
Giant slalom	Vreni Schneider; Switzerland	2:06.49	Christa Kinshofer; West Germany	2:07.42	Maria Walliser; Switzerland	2:07.72
Slalom	Vreni Schneider; Switzerland	1:36.69	Mateja Svet; Yugoslavia	1:38.37	Christa Kinshofer; West Germany	1:38.40
Combined	Anita Wachter; Austria	29.25	Brigitte Oertli; Switzerland	29.48	Maria Walliser; Switzerland	51.28

== Course information ==
Date	Race	Start Elevation	Finish Elevation	Vertical Drop	Course Length	Average Gradient
Mon 15-Feb	Downhill – men	2,412 m (7,913 ft)	1,538 m (5,046 ft)	874 m (2,867 ft)	3.147 km (1.955 mi)	27.8%
Fri 19-Feb	Downhill – women	2,179 m (7,149 ft)	1,532 m (5,026 ft)	647 m (2,123 ft)	2.238 km (1.391 mi)	28.9%
Tue 16-Feb	Downhill - (K) – men	2,342 m (7,684 ft)	1,538 m (5,046 ft)	804 m (2,638 ft)	2.967 km (1.844 mi)	27.1%
Sat 20-Feb	Downhill - (K) – women	2,108 m (6,916 ft)	1,532 m (5,026 ft)	576 m (1,890 ft)	2.054 km (1.276 mi)	28.0%
Sun 21-Feb	Super-G – men	2,179 m (7,149 ft)	1,532 m (5,026 ft)	647 m (2,123 ft)	2.327 km (1.446 mi)	27.8%
Mon 22-Feb	Super-G – women	2,039 m (6,690 ft)	1,532 m (5,026 ft)	507 m (1,663 ft)	1.943 km (1.207 mi)	26.1%
Thu 25-Feb	Giant slalom – men	2,243 m (7,359 ft)	1,874 m (6,148 ft)	369 m (1,211 ft)	1.175 km (0.730 mi)	31.4%
Wed 24-Feb	Giant slalom – women	2,205 m (7,234 ft)	1,880 m (6,168 ft)	325 m (1,066 ft)	0.839 km (0.521 mi)	38.7%
Sat 27-Feb	Slalom – men	2,074 m (6,804 ft)	1,875 m (6,152 ft)	198 m (650 ft)	0.530 km (0.329 mi)	37.4%
Fri 26-Feb	Slalom – women	2,060 m (6,759 ft)	1,880 m (6,168 ft)	180 m (591 ft)	0.550 km (0.342 mi)	32.7%
Wed 17-Feb	Slalom – (K) – men	2,051 m (6,729 ft)	1,875 m (6,152 ft)	176 m (577 ft)		
Sun 21-Feb	Slalom – (K) – women	2,024 m (6,640 ft)	1,880 m (6,168 ft)	144 m (472 ft)		

== Participating nations ==
Forty-three nations sent alpine skiers to compete in the events in Calgary. Guatemala, the US Virgin Islands, and Puerto Rico made their Olympic alpine skiing debuts. Below is a list of the competing nations; in parentheses are the number of national competitors.

- Andorra (4)
- Argentina (10)
- Australia (3)
- Austria (17)
- Bolivia (6)
- Bulgaria (4)
- Canada (18)
- Chile (5)
- Costa Rica (2)
- Cyprus (3)
- Czechoslovakia (5)
- Finland (1)
- France (18)
- West Germany (17)
- Great Britain (12)
- Greece (3)
- Guatemala (4)
- Iceland (2)
- India (3)
- Italy (11)
- Japan (6)
- South Korea (4)
- Lebanon (4)
- Liechtenstein (9)
- Luxembourg (1)
- Mexico (4)
- Monaco (1)
- Morocco (3)
- New Zealand (3)
- Norway (3)
- Poland (1)
- Puerto Rico (6)
- Romania (1)
- San Marino (4)
- Soviet Union (3)
- Spain (6)
- Sweden (12)
- Switzerland (17)
- Chinese Taipei (5)
- Turkey (4)
- United States (17)
- Virgin Islands (1)
- Yugoslavia (9)

== See also ==
- Alpine skiing at the 1988 Winter Paralympics
