= Soviet Union at the 1988 Winter Olympics =

- Flag of the Soviet Union
- IOC code: URS
- NOC: Soviet Olympic Committee

in Calgary
- Competitors: 101 (78 men, 23 women) in 10 sports
- Flag bearer: Andrei Bukin (figure skating)
- Medals Ranked 1st: Gold 11 Silver 9 Bronze 9 Total 29

Winter Olympics appearances (overview)
- 1956; 1960; 1964; 1968; 1972; 1976; 1980; 1984; 1988

Other related appearances
- Latvia (1924–1936, 1992–pres.); Estonia (1928–1936, 1992–pres.); Lithuania (1928, 1992–pres.); Unified Team (1992); Armenia (1994–pres.); Belarus (1994–2022); Georgia (1994–pres.); Kazakhstan (1994–pres.); Kyrgyzstan (1994–pres.); Moldova (1994–pres.); Russia (1994–2014); Ukraine (1994–pres.); Uzbekistan (1994–pres.); Azerbaijan (1998–pres.); Tajikistan (2002–pres.); Olympic Athletes from Russia (2018); ROC (2022); Individual Neutral Athletes (2026)

The Union of Soviet Socialist Republics (Soviet Union) competed at the 1988 Winter Olympics in Calgary, Alberta, Canada. It would be the last Winter Olympic Games before the dissolution of the USSR in 1991. Six of the former Soviet republics would compete together as the Unified Team at the 1992 Winter Olympics, and each republic would be independently represented at subsequent Games.

The Soviet Union had its best showing at the Winter Olympics in terms of total medals (overtaking its 1976 result with 27 medals) and second-best in terms of gold medals (after the aforementioned 1976 result with 13 gold medals).

== Medalists ==
Medal	Name	Sport	Event	Date
Gold	Vida Vencienė	Cross-country skiing	Women's 10 kilometre classical	14 February
Gold	Aleksey Prokurorov	Cross-country skiing	Men's 30 kilometre classical	15 February
Gold	Ekaterina Gordeeva; Sergei Grinkov	Figure skating	Pair skating	16 February
Gold	Nikolay Gulyayev	Speed skating	Men's 1000 metres	18 February
Gold	Mikhail Devyatyarov	Cross-country skiing	Men's 15 kilometre classical	19 February
Gold	Jānis Ķipurs; Vladimir Kozlov	Bobsleigh	Two-man	21 February
Gold	Svetlana Nageykina; Nina Gavrilyuk; Tamara Tikhonova; Anfisa Reztsova	Cross-country skiing	Women's 4 × 5 kilometre relay	21 February
Gold	Natalia Bestemianova; Andrei Bukin	Figure skating	Ice dance	23 February
Gold	Tamara Tikhonova	Cross-country skiing	Women's 20 kilometre freestyle	25 February
Gold	Dmitry Vasilyev; Sergei Tchepikov; Aleksandr Popov; Valeriy Medvedtsev	Biathlon	Relay	26 February
Gold	Soviet Union men's national ice hockey team: Evgeny Belosheikin; Ilya Byakin; Vyacheslav Bykov; Viacheslav Fetisov; Alexei Gusarov; Sergei Yashin; Valeri Kamensky; Sergei Svetlov; Alexei Kasatonov; Andrei Khomutov; Vladimir Krutov; Igor Larionov; Aleksandr Kozhevnikov; Igor Kravchuk; Andrei Lomakin; Aleksandr Chernykh; Sergei Makarov; Alexander Mogilny; Sergei Mylnikov; Vitali Samoilov; Anatoly Semenov; Sergei Starikov; Igor Stelnov	Ice hockey	Men's competition	28 February
Silver	Raisa Smetanina	Cross-country skiing	Women's 10 kilometre classical	14 February
Silver	Vladimir Smirnov	Cross-country skiing	Men's 30 kilometre classical	15 February
Silver	Elena Valova; Oleg Vassiliev	Figure skating	Pair skating	16 February
Silver	Tamara Tikhonova	Cross-country skiing	Women's 5 kilometre classical	17 February
Silver	Valeriy Medvedtsev	Biathlon	Individual	20 February
Silver	Vladimir Smirnov; Vladimir Sakhnov; Mikhail Devyatyarov; Aleksey Prokurorov	Cross-country skiing	Men's 4 × 10 kilometre relay	22 February
Silver	Valeriy Medvedtsev	Biathlon	Sprint	23 February
Silver	Marina Klimova; Sergei Ponomarenko	Figure skating	Ice dance	23 February
Silver	Anfisa Reztsova	Cross-country skiing	Women's 20 kilometre freestyle	25 February
Bronze	Yury Kharchenko	Luge	Men's singles	15 February
Bronze	Vida Vencienė	Cross-country skiing	Women's 5 kilometre classical	17 February
Bronze	Igor Zhelezovsky	Speed skating	Men's 1000 metres	18 February
Bronze	Vladimir Smirnov	Cross-country skiing	Men's 15 kilometre classical	19 February
Bronze	Viktor Petrenko	Figure skating	Men's singles	20 February
Bronze	Sergei Tchepikov	Biathlon	Sprint	23 February
Bronze	Raisa Smetanina	Cross-country skiing	Women's 20 kilometre freestyle	25 February
Bronze	Jānis Ķipurs; Guntis Osis; Juris Tone; Vladimir Kozlov	Bobsleigh	Four-man	28 February
Bronze	Allar Levandi	Nordic combined	Individual	28 February

== Competitors ==
The following is the list of number of competitors in the Games.

Sport	Men	Women	Total
Alpine skiing	2	1	3
Biathlon	5	–	5
Bobsleigh	10	–	10
Cross-country skiing	6	6	12
Figure skating	9	8	17
Ice hockey	21	–	21
Luge	7	3	10
Nordic combined	4	–	4
Ski jumping	2	–	2
Speed skating	12	5	17
Total	78	23	101

== Alpine skiing ==
Men

Athlete	Event	Race 1	Race 2	Total	
Athlete	Event	Time	Time	Time	Rank
Sergey Petrik	Super-G			DNF	–
Konstantin Chistyakov	Super-G			DNF	–
Konstantin Chistyakov	Giant Slalom	1:10.09	1:06.58	2:16.67	35
Sergey Petrik	Giant Slalom	1:09.78	1:05.38	2:15.16	30
Konstantin Chistyakov	Slalom	DNF	–	DNF	–
Sergey Petrik	Slalom	55.39	DNF	DNF	–

Men's combined

Athlete	Downhill	Slalom		Total	
Athlete	Time	Time 1	Time 2	Points	Rank
Konstantin Chistyakov	1:55.99	DNF	–	DNF	–
Sergey Petrik	1:55.82	DSQ	–	DSQ	–

Women

Athlete	Event	Race 1	Race 2	Total	
Athlete	Event	Time	Time	Time	Rank
Golnur Postnikova	Downhill			1:28.23	16

Women's combined

Athlete	Downhill	Slalom		Total	
Athlete	Time	Time 1	Time 2	Points	Rank
Golnur Postnikova	DNF	–	–	DNF	–

== Biathlon ==
Men

Event	Athlete	Misses ^{1}	Time	Rank
10 km Sprint	Juri Kashkarov	3	26:49.1	18
10 km Sprint	Dmitry Vasilyev	1	26:09.7	9
10 km Sprint	Sergei Tchepikov	0	25:29.4	3rd place, bronze medalist(s)
10 km Sprint	Valeriy Medvedtsev	0	25:23.7	2nd place, silver medalist(s)

Event	Athlete	Time	Misses	Adjusted time ^{2}	Rank
20 km	Aleksandr Popov	56:24.0	3	59:24.0	12
20 km	Juri Kashkarov	55:43.1	2	57:43.1	5
20 km	Sergei Tchepikov	56:17.5	1	57:17.5	4
20 km	Valeriy Medvedtsev	54:54.6	2	56:54.6	2nd place, silver medalist(s)

Men's 4 x 7.5 km relay

Athletes	Race		
Athletes	Misses ^{1}	Time	Rank
Dmitry Vasilyev; Sergei Tchepikov; Aleksandr Popov; Valeriy Medvedtsev	0	1'22:30.0	1st place, gold medalist(s)

== Bobsleigh ==
Sled	Athletes	Event	Run 1		Run 2		Run 3		Run 4		Total	
Sled	Athletes	Event	Time	Rank	Time	Rank	Time	Rank	Time	Rank	Time	Rank
URS-1	Jānis Ķipurs; Vladimir Kozlov	Two-man	57.43	4	58.05	1	59.52	2	58.48	2	3:53.48	1st place, gold medalist(s)
URS-2	Zintis Ekmanis; Aivars Trops	Two-man	57.95	10	59.12	6	1:00.72	14	59.13	6	3:56.92	9

Sled	Athletes	Event	Run 1		Run 2		Run 3		Run 4		Total	
Sled	Athletes	Event	Time	Rank	Time	Rank	Time	Rank	Time	Rank	Time	Rank
URS-1	Māris Poikāns; Olafs Kļaviņš; Ivars Bērzups; Juris Jaudzems	Four-man	56.75	6	57.66	7	56.70	10	57.24	2	3:48.35	5
URS-2	Jānis Ķipurs; Guntis Osis; Juris Tone; Vladimir Kozlov	Four-man	56.72	4	57.28	1	56.41	4	57.85	7	3:48.26	3rd place, bronze medalist(s)

== Cross-country skiing ==
Men

Event	Athlete	Race	
Event	Athlete	Time	Rank
15 km C	Aleksey Prokurorov	43:36.9	18
15 km C	Aleksandr Batyuk	43:08.7	15
15 km C	Vladimir Smirnov	41:48.5	3rd place, bronze medalist(s)
15 km C	Mikhail Devyatyarov	41:18.9	1st place, gold medalist(s)
30 km C	Yury Burlakov	1'28:02.4	12
30 km C	Mikhail Devyatyarov	1'25:31.3	4
30 km C	Vladimir Smirnov	1'24:35.1	2nd place, silver medalist(s)
30 km C	Aleksey Prokurorov	1'24:26.3	1st place, gold medalist(s)
50 km F	Aleksey Prokurorov	2'14:01.0	38
50 km F	Yury Burlakov	2'12:02.2	26
50 km F	Mikhail Devyatyarov	2'12:01.7	25
50 km F	Vladimir Sakhnov	2'09:00.1	12

C = Classical style, F = Freestyle

Men's 4 × 10 km relay

Athletes	Race	
Athletes	Time	Rank
Vladimir Smirnov; Vladimir Sakhnov; Mikhail Devyatyarov; Aleksey Prokurorov	1'44:11.3	2nd place, silver medalist(s)

Women

Event	Athlete	Race	
Event	Athlete	Time	Rank
5 km C	Raisa Smetanina	15:35.9	10
5 km C	Svetlana Nageykina	15:29.9	8
5 km C	Vida Vencienė	15:11.1	3rd place, bronze medalist(s)
5 km C	Tamara Tikhonova	15:05.3	2nd place, silver medalist(s)
10 km C	Tamara Tikhonova	30:38.9	5
10 km C	Svetlana Nageykina	30:26.5	4
10 km C	Raisa Smetanina	30:17.0	2nd place, silver medalist(s)
10 km C	Vida Vencienė	30:08.3	1st place, gold medalist(s)
20 km F	Nina Gavrilyuk	DSQ	–
20 km F	Raisa Smetanina	57:22.1	3rd place, bronze medalist(s)
20 km F	Anfisa Reztsova	56:12.8	2nd place, silver medalist(s)
20 km F	Tamara Tikhonova	55:53.6	1st place, gold medalist(s)

C = Classical style, F = Freestyle

Women's 4 × 5 km relay

Athletes	Race	
Athletes	Time	Rank
Svetlana Nageykina; Nina Gavrilyuk; Tamara Tikhonova; Anfisa Reztsova	59:51.1	1st place, gold medalist(s)

== Figure skating ==
Men

Athlete	CF	SP	FS	TFP	Rank
Vladimir Kotin	5	6	8	13.4	6
Alexander Fadeev	1	9	5	8.2	4
Viktor Petrenko	6	3	3	7.8	3rd place, bronze medalist(s)

Women

Athlete	CF	SP	FS	TFP	Rank
Anna Kondrashova	9	7	7	15.2	8
Kira Ivanova	1	10	9	13.6	7

Pairs

Athletes	SP	FS	TFP	Rank
Larisa Selezneva; Oleg Makarov	6	4	6.0	4
Elena Valova; Oleg Vassiliev	2	2	3.0	2nd place, silver medalist(s)
Ekaterina Gordeeva; Sergei Grinkov	1	1	1.5	1st place, gold medalist(s)

Ice dancing

Athletes	CD	OD	FD	TFP	Rank
Natalia Annenko; Genrikh Sretenski	4	4	4	8.0	4
Marina Klimova; Sergei Ponomarenko	2	2	2	4.0	2nd place, silver medalist(s)
Natalia Bestemianova; Andrei Bukin	1	1	1	2.0	1st place, gold medalist(s)

== Ice hockey ==
=== First round ===
Top three teams (shaded ones) advanced to the medal round.

	Pld	W	L	T	GF	GA	Pts
Soviet Union	5	5	0	0	32	10	10
West Germany	5	4	1	0	19	12	8
Czechoslovakia	5	3	2	0	23	14	6
United States	5	2	3	0	27	27	4
Austria	5	0	4	1	12	29	1
Norway	5	0	4	1	11	32	1

- Soviet Union 5-0 Norway
- Soviet Union 8-1 Austria
- Soviet Union 7-5 USA
- West Germany 3-6 Soviet Union
- Soviet Union 6-1 Czechoslovakia

=== Medal round ===
The top three teams from each group play the top three teams from the other group once. Points from previous games against their own group carry over.

	Pld	W	L	T	GF	GA	Pts
Soviet Union (gold)	5	4	1	0	25	7	8
Finland	5	3	1	1	18	10	7
Sweden	5	2	1	2	15	16	6
Canada	5	2	2	1	17	14	5
West Germany	5	1	4	0	8	26	2
Czechoslovakia	5	1	4	0	12	22	2

- Soviet Union 5-0 Canada
- Soviet Union 7-1 Sweden
- Finland 2-1 Soviet Union

Roster:
Evgeny Belosheikin
Ilya Byakin
Vyacheslav Bykov
Viacheslav Fetisov
Alexei Gusarov
Sergei Yashin
Valeri Kamensky
Alexei Kasatonov
Andrei Khomutov
Vladimir Krutov
Igor Larionov
Aleksandr Kozhevnikov
Igor Kravchuk
Andrei Lomakin
Sergei Makarov
Alexander Mogilny
Sergei Mylnikov
Vitali Samoilov
Anatoly Semenov
Sergei Starikov
Igor Stelnov
Sergei Svetlov
Aleksandr Chernykh

== Luge ==
Men

Athlete	Run 1		Run 2		Run 3		Run 4		Total	
Athlete	Time	Rank	Time	Rank	Time	Rank	Time	Rank	Time	Rank
Valery Dudin	47.812	28	46.982	13	47.061	13	47.025	9	3:08.880	17
Sergey Danilin	46.564	5	46.827	7	46.648	5	47.059	10	3:07.098	6
Yury Kharchenko	46.391	3	46.605	3	46.475	3	46.803	4	3:06.274	3rd place, bronze medalist(s)

Men's doubles

Athletes	Run 1		Run 2		Total	
Athletes	Time	Rank	Time	Rank	Time	Rank
Vitaly Melnik; Dmitry Alekseyev	46.060	6	46.399	6	1:32.459	6
Yevgeny Belousov; Aleksandr Belyakov	45.973	3	46.580	8	1:32.553	7

Women

Athlete	Run 1		Run 2		Run 3		Run 4		Total	
Athlete	Time	Rank	Time	Rank	Time	Rank	Time	Rank	Time	Rank
Irina Kusakina	46.690	11	47.071	12	46.643	8	46.639	9	3:07.043	10
Nadezhda Danilina	46.597	10	46.447	6	46.613	6	46.707	11	3:06.364	8
Yuliya Antipova	46.449	7	46.425	5	46.610	5	46.303	4	3:05.787	5

== Nordic combined ==
Men's individual

Events:

- normal hill ski jumping (best two out of three jumps)
- 15 km cross-country skiing (start delay, based on ski jumping results)

Athlete	Event	Ski jumping		Cross-country		Total	
Athlete	Event	Points	Rank	Start at	Time	Points	Rank
Sergey Nikiforov	Individual	191.8	30	4:04.7	42:43.0	402.905	14
Andrey Dundukov	Individual	194.0	26	3:50.0	42:21.1	406.185	12
Vasily Savin	Individual	203.7	17	2:45.4	41:22.9	414.925	10
Allar Levandi	Individual	216.6	4	1:19.4	40:31.8	422.590	3rd place, bronze medalist(s)

Men's team

Three participants per team.

Events:

- normal hill ski jumping (three jumps per team member per round, best two rounds counted)
- 10 km cross-country skiing (start delay, based on ski jumping results)

Athletes	Ski jumping		Cross-country		Total
Athletes	Points	Rank	Start at	Time	Rank
Andrey Dundukov; Vasily Savin; Allar Levandi	282.5	11	DNF	DNF	–

== Ski jumping ==
Athlete	Event	Jump 1		Jump 2		Total	
Athlete	Event	Distance	Points	Distance	Points	Points	Rank
Eduard Suboch	Normal hill	76.0	83.7	78.0	89.9	173.6	38
Mikhail Yesin	Normal hill	80.0	92.1	74.0	79.5	171.6	39

== Speed skating ==
Men

Event	Athlete	Race	
Event	Athlete	Time	Rank
500 m	Nikolay Gulyayev	1:02.86	36
500 m	Vitaly Makovetsky	37.35	12
500 m	Igor Zhelezovsky	36.94	6
500 m	Sergey Fokichev	36.82	4
1000 m	Boris Repnin	1:14.41	12
1000 m	Andrey Bakhvalov	1:14.39	11
1000 m	Igor Zhelezovsky	1:13.19	3rd place, bronze medalist(s)
1000 m	Nikolay Gulyayev	1:13.03 OR	1st place, gold medalist(s)
1500 m	Andrey Bobrov	1:58.97	35
1500 m	Nikolay Gulyayev	1:53.04	7
1500 m	Aleksandr Klimov	1:52.97	6
1500 m	Igor Zhelezovsky	1:52.63	4
5000 m	Yury Klyuyev	7:00.01	26
5000 m	Sergey Berezin	6:58.08	23
5000 m	Dmitry Bochkaryov	6:56.57	17
10,000 m	Aleksandr Mozin	14:28.91	18
10,000 m	Sergey Berezin	14:20.48	9
10,000 m	Yury Klyuyev	14:09.68	6

Women

Event	Athlete	Race	
Event	Athlete	Time	Rank
500 m	Yelena Ilyina	41.15	16
500 m	Nataliya Shive-Glebova	40.66	9
1000 m	Nataliya Shive-Glebova	1:22.99	20
1000 m	Yelena Ilyina	1:22.40	18
1500 m	Yelena Tumanova	2:07.71	15
1500 m	Yelena Lapuga	2:04.24	5
3000 m	Yelena Tumanova	4:24.07	9
3000 m	Yelena Lapuga	4:23.29	7
3000 m	Svetlana Boyko	4:22.90	6
5000 m	Yelena Tumanova	7:40.82	15
5000 m	Yelena Lapuga	7:28.65	5
5000 m	Svetlana Boyko	7:28.39	4

== Medals by republic ==
In the following table for team events number of team representatives, who received medals are counted, not "one medal for all the team", as usual. Because there were people from different republics in one team.

Rank	Nation	Gold	Silver	Bronze	Total
1	Russian SFSR	38	9	4	51
2	Latvian SSR	2	0	3	5
3	Kazakh SSR	1	4	1	6
4	Lithuanian SSR	1	0	1	2
5	Ukrainian SSR	0	0	2	2
6	Byelorussian SSR	0	0	1	1
6	Estonian SSR	0	0	1	1
Totals (7 entries)		42	13	13	68
