= Great Britain at the 1988 Winter Olympics =

- Flag of the United Kingdom
- IOC code: GBR
- NOC: British Olympic Association

in Calgary
- Competitors: 48 in 8 sports
- Flag bearers: Nick Phipps (opening); Wilf O'Reilly (closing)
- Medals Ranked 17th: Gold 0 Silver 0 Bronze 0 Total 0

Winter Olympics appearances (overview)
- 1924; 1928; 1932; 1936; 1948; 1952; 1956; 1960; 1964; 1968; 1972; 1976; 1980; 1984; 1988; 1992; 1994; 1998; 2002; 2006; 2010; 2014; 2018; 2022; 2026

The United Kingdom of Great Britain and Northern Ireland competed as Great Britain at the 1988 Winter Olympics in Calgary, Alberta, Canada.

Eddie "The Eagle" Edwards, representing Great Britain, achieved international fame for what the BBC described as "his brave but laughable attempts at ski-jumping".

== Competitors ==
The following is the list of number of competitors in the Games.

Sport	Men	Women	Total
Alpine skiing	6	6	11
Biathlon	4	–	4
Bobsleigh	8	–	8
Cross-country skiing	6	2	8
Figure skating	4	5	9
Luge	3	1	4
Ski jumping	1	–	1
Speed skating	2	0	2
Total	34	14	48

== Alpine skiing ==
Men

Athlete	Event	Race 1	Race 2	Total	
Athlete	Event	Time	Time	Time	Rank
Ronald Duncan	Downhill			2:07.88	37
Graham Bell	Downhill			2:04.56	23
Martin Bell	Downhill			2:02.49	8
Graham Bell	Super-G			1:48.98	35
Martin Bell	Super-G			1:48.82	34
Nigel Smith	Super-G			1:47.15	29
Graham Bell	Giant Slalom	DNF	–	DNF	–
Morgan Jones	Giant Slalom	DNF	–	DNF	–
Robbie Hourmont	Giant Slalom	1:13.54	DNF	DNF	–
Martin Bell	Giant Slalom	1:12.64	1:09.72	2:22.36	41
Morgan Jones	Slalom	DNF	–	DNF	–
Robbie Hourmont	Slalom	58.21	53.38	1:51.59	21

Men's combined

Athlete	Downhill	Slalom		Total	
Athlete	Time	Time 1	Time 2	Points	Rank
Ronald Duncan	1:53.40	DNF	–	DNF	–
Graham Bell	1:50.25	DSQ	–	DSQ	–
Martin Bell	1:49.54	1:24.34	50.49	422.79	26

Women

Athlete	Event	Race 1	Race 2	Total	
Athlete	Event	Time	Time	Time	Rank
Clare Booth	Downhill			1:32.50	25
Wendy Lumby	Downhill			1:29.76	22
Clare Booth	Super-G			1:26.27	35
Wendy Lumby	Super-G			1:24.36	31
Wendy Lumby	Giant Slalom	DSQ	–	DSQ	–
Sarah Lewis	Giant Slalom	DNF	–	DNF	–
Lesley Beck	Giant Slalom	DNF	–	DNF	–
Ingrid Grant	Giant Slalom	1:06.52	DNF	DNF	–
Kirstin Cairns	Slalom	DNF	–	DNF	–
Sarah Lewis	Slalom	DNF	–	DNF	–
Lesley Beck	Slalom	51.70	DNF	DNF	–

Women's combined

Athlete	Downhill	Slalom		Total	
Athlete	Time	Time 1	Time 2	Points	Rank
Clare Booth	1:20.58	DNF	–	DNF	–
Wendy Lumby	1:19.86	44.59	46.43	138.06	19

== Biathlon ==
Men

Event	Athlete	Misses ^{1}	Time	Rank
10 km Sprint	Trevor King	5	30:00.5	61
10 km Sprint	Mark Langin	5	29:52.1	60
10 km Sprint	Carl Davies	2	28:12.1	45
10 km Sprint	Mike Dixon	0	26:53.3	21

Event	Athlete	Time	Misses	Adjusted time ^{2}	Rank
20 km	Mark Langin	1'01:50.3	4	1'05:50.3	53
20 km	Trevor King	58:37.9	6	1'04:37.9	47
20 km	Carl Davies	58:54.1	3	1'01:54.1	28
20 km	Mike Dixon	57:32.4	2	59:32.4	13

Men's 4 x 7.5 km relay

Athletes	Race		
Athletes	Misses ^{1}	Time	Rank
Mike Dixon; Mark Langin; Carl Davies; Trevor King	5	1'31:44.6	13

^{1} A penalty loop of 150 metres had to be skied per missed target.
^{2} One minute added per missed target.

== Bobsleigh ==
Sled	Athletes	Event	Run 1		Run 2		Run 3		Run 4		Total	
Sled	Athletes	Event	Time	Rank	Time	Rank	Time	Rank	Time	Rank	Time	Rank
GBR-1	Tom De La Hunty; Alec Leonce	Two-man	57.83	8	59.77	11	1:00.91	15	59.50	10	3:58.01	12
GBR-2	Mark Tout; David Armstrong	Two-man	58.10	12	1:00.31	20	1:01.11	20	59.87	15	3:59.39	18

Sled	Athletes	Event	Run 1		Run 2		Run 3		Run 4		Total	
Sled	Athletes	Event	Time	Rank	Time	Rank	Time	Rank	Time	Rank	Time	Rank
GBR-1	Mark Tout; David Armstrong; Lenny Paul; Audley Richards	Four-man	57.22	16	58.26	17	56.86	14	57.56	5	3:49.90	12
GBR-2	Tom De La Hunty; Colin Rattigan; George Robertson; Alec Leonce	Four-man	57.81	22	58.13	15	56.74	12	58.59	20	3:51.27	17

== Cross-country skiing ==
Men

Event	Athlete	Race	
Event	Athlete	Time	Rank
15 km C	Ron Howden	50:47.4	73
15 km C	Martin Watkins	49:16.6	65
15 km C	Patrick Winterton	48:36.0	60
15 km C	John Spotswood	45:47.3	38
30 km C	Ewan McKenzie	1'40:06.7	67
30 km C	Patrick Winterton	1'39:57.6	66
30 km C	Martin Watkins	1'38:30.3	61
30 km C	John Spotswood	1'36:42.7	54
50 km F	Ewan McKenzie	2'24:58.2	55
50 km F	Martin Watkins	2'24:48.3	54

C = Classical style, F = Freestyle

Men's 4 × 10 km relay

Athletes	Race	
Athletes	Time	Rank
John Spotswood; Ewan McKenzie; Martin Watkins; Andrew Wylie	1'59:39.3	16

Women

Event	Athlete	Race	
Event	Athlete	Time	Rank
5 km C	Jean Watson	18:54.1	53
5 km C	Louise McKenzie	18:41.8	52
10 km C	Jean Watson	37:54.0	50
10 km C	Louise McKenzie	36:58.7	49
20 km F	Louise McKenzie	1'11:07.3	52

C = Classical style, F = Freestyle

== Figure skating ==
Men

Athlete	CF	SP	FS	TFP	Rank
Paul Robinson	16	21	18	36.0	18

Women

Athlete	CF	SP	FS	TFP	Rank
Gina Fulton	24	24	23	47.0	23
Joanne Conway	8	18	16	28.0	12

Pairs

Athletes	SP	FS	TFP	Rank
Lisa Cushley; Neil Cushley	14	13	20.0	13
Cheryl Peake; Andrew Naylor	12	12	18.0	12

Ice Dancing

Athletes	CD	OD	FD	TFP	Rank
Sharon Jones; Paul Askham	13	13	13	26.0	13

== Luge ==
Men

Athlete	Run 1		Run 2		Run 3		Run 4		Total	
Athlete	Time	Rank	Time	Rank	Time	Rank	Time	Rank	Time	Rank
Stephen Brialey	49.689	34	48.687	31	47.568	20	47.677	21	3:13.621	30
Nick Ovett	48.181	30	48.163	30	48.518	27	48.446	30	3:13.308	28
Macleod Nicol	47.701	27	47.679	24	47.569	21	48.008	23	3:10.957	22

(Men's) Doubles

Athletes	Run 1		Run 2		Total	
Athletes	Time	Rank	Time	Rank	Time	Rank
Stephen Brialey; Nick Ovett	46.912	15	47.764	15	1:34.676	15

Women

Athlete	Run 1		Run 2		Run 3		Run 4		Total	
Athlete	Time	Rank	Time	Rank	Time	Rank	Time	Rank	Time	Rank
Alyson Wreford	49.888	24	48.247	20	47.849	18	47.726	20	3:13.730	20

== Ski jumping ==
Athlete	Event	Jump 1		Jump 2		Total	
Athlete	Event	Distance	Points	Distance	Points	Points	Rank
Eddie Edwards	Normal hill	60.5	34.1	55.0	35.1	69.2	58
Eddie Edwards	Large hill	71.0	30.0	67.0	27.5	57.5	55

== Speed skating ==
Men

Event	Athlete	Race	
Event	Athlete	Time	Rank
1000 m	Julian Green	1:57.30	36
1000 m	Craig McNicoll	1:18.60	34
1500 m	Craig McNicoll	2:01.89	38
1500 m	Julian Green	1:59.41	37
5000 m	Craig McNicoll	7:34.14	38
5000 m	Julian Green	7:13.20	37
10,000 m	Julian Green	14:59.53	30
