= Bobsleigh at the 1988 Winter Olympics =

Bobsleigh at the XV Olympic Winter Games
- Venue: Canada Olympic Park
- Dates: 20–28 February 1988
- Competitors: 135 from 23 nations

Bobsleigh at the 1988 Winter Olympics consisted of two events, at Canada Olympic Park. The competition took place between February 20 and February 28, 1988.

The event included competitors from countries with little history of bobsleigh participation and/or little or no snow. These countries included Jamaica (whose involvement spurred the film Cool Runnings in 1993), Mexico, and New Zealand. An informal "Caribbean Cup" of such countries was won by New Zealand's Alexander Peterson and Peter Henry, who finished equal twentieth. In the two-man event, the best result from a completely snow-less country was fifteenth by Chen Chin-san and Lee Chen-tan of the Chinese Taipei.

== Medal summary ==
=== Medal table ===
Rank	Nation	Gold	Silver	Bronze	Total
1	Soviet Union	1	0	1	2
2	Switzerland	1	0	0	1
3	East Germany	0	2	1	3
Totals (3 entries)		2	2	2	6

Three countries won medals in Calgary, with the Soviet Union leading the medal table, winning two medals, one gold and one bronze. East Germany won the most medals, with three.

=== Events ===
Event	Gold		Silver		Bronze	
Two-man	Soviet Union (URS-1); Jānis Ķipurs; Vladimir Kozlov	3:53.48	East Germany (GDR-1); Wolfgang Hoppe; Bogdan Musioł	3:54.19	East Germany (GDR-2); Bernhard Lehmann; Mario Hoyer	3:54.64
Four-man	Switzerland (SUI-1); Ekkehard Fasser; Kurt Meier; Marcel Fässler; Werner Stocker	3:47.51	East Germany (GDR-1); Wolfgang Hoppe; Dietmar Schauerhammer; Bogdan Musioł; Ingo Voge	3:47.58	Soviet Union (URS-2); Jānis Ķipurs; Guntis Osis; Juris Tone; Vladimir Kozlov	3:48.26

== Participating NOCs ==
Twenty-three nations participated in bobsleigh at the 1988 Games. With nine debutants, more than a third of these were competing in Olympic bobsleigh for the first time. The nations making debuts were Netherlands Antilles, Australia, Bulgaria, U.S. Virgin Islands, Jamaica, Mexico, Monaco, New Zealand and Portugal.

- Australia (5)
- Austria (8)
- Bulgaria (5)
- Canada (9)
- East Germany (10)
- West Germany (8)
- Great Britain (8)
- Italy (9)
- Jamaica (4)
- Japan (4)
- Mexico (4)
- Monaco (2)
- Netherlands Antilles (2)
- New Zealand (2)
- Portugal (5)
- Romania (5)
- Soviet Union (10)
- Sweden (2)
- Switzerland (10)
- Chinese Taipei (5)
- United States (9)
- Virgin Islands (4)
- Yugoslavia (2)

=== Ireland ===
For the first time, a team from Ireland was also entered in the competition. However, just ten days before the opening ceremony took place, its entry was cancelled by the Olympic Council of Ireland, without explanation. An attempt to overturn the withdrawal in court was unsuccessful. The story is told in the 2020 documentary film Breaking Ice.

== See also ==
- Jamaican Bobsled Team
