= Bobsleigh at the 1988 Winter Olympics – Four-man =

Four-man at the XV Olympic Winter Games
- Venue: Canada Olympic Park
- Dates: February 27 — 28, 1988
- Competitors: 104 from 17 nations
- Winning time: 3:47.51

Medalists
| 1st place, gold medalist(s) | | Switzerland; Ekkehard Fasser, Kurt Meier, Marcel Fässler, Werner Stocker |
| 2nd place, silver medalist(s) | | East Germany; Wolfgang Hoppe, Dietmar Schauerhammer, Bogdan Musioł, Ingo Voge |
| 3rd place, bronze medalist(s) | | Soviet Union; Jānis Ķipurs, Guntis Osis, Juris Tone, Vladimir Kozlov |

The Four-man bobsleigh competition at the 1988 Winter Olympics in Calgary was held on 27 and 28 February, at Canada Olympic Park.

== Results ==
| Rank | Country | Athletes | Run 1 | Run 2 | Run 3 | Run 4 | Total |
|---|---|---|---|---|---|---|---|
| 1st place, gold medalist(s) | Switzerland (SUI-1) | Ekkehard Fasser; Kurt Meier; Marcel Fässler; Werner Stocker | 56.83 | 57.37 | 55.88 | 57.43 | 3:47.51 |
| 2nd place, silver medalist(s) | East Germany (GDR-1) | Wolfgang Hoppe; Dietmar Schauerhammer; Bogdan Musioł; Ingo Voge | 56.16 | 57.31 | 56.77 | 57.34 | 3:47.58 |
| 3rd place, bronze medalist(s) | Soviet Union (URS-2) | Jānis Ķipurs; Guntis Osis; Juris Tone; Vladimir Kozlov | 56.72 | 57.28 | 56.41 | 57.85 | 3:48.26 |
| 4 | United States (USA-1) | Brent Rushlaw; Hal Hoye; Mike Wasko; Bill White | 56.72 | 57.67 | 56.69 | 57.20 | 3:48.28 |
| 5 | Soviet Union (URS-1) | Māris Poikāns; Olafs Kļaviņš; Ivars Bērzups; Juris Jaudzems | 56.75 | 57.66 | 56.70 | 57.24 | 3:48.35 |
| 6 | Austria (AUT-1) | Peter Kienast; Franz Siegl; Christian Mark; Kurt Teigl | 57.07 | 57.40 | 56.27 | 57.91 | 3:48.65 |
| 7 | Austria (AUT-2) | Ingo Appelt; Josef Muigg; Gerhard Redl; Harald Winkler | 56.93 | 57.51 | 56.41 | 58.10 | 3:48.95 |
| 8 | East Germany (GDR-2) | Detlef Richter; Bodo Ferl; Ludwig Jahn; Alexander Szelig | 57.18 | 57.60 | 56.33 | 57.95 | 3:49.06 |
| 9 | Switzerland (SUI-2) | Hans Hiltebrand; Urs Fehlmann; Erwin Fassbind; André Kiser | 56.39 | 57.91 | 57.13 | 57.82 | 3:49.25 |
| 10 | Italy (ITA-1) | Alex Wolf; Pasquale Gesuito; Georg Beikircher; Stefano Ticci | 57.20 | 57.72 | 56.53 | 58.01 | 3:49.46 |
| 11 | West Germany (FRG-2) | Anton Fischer; Franz Nießner; Uwe Eisenreich; Christoph Langen | 57.02 | 57.75 | 56.71 | 58.07 | 3:49.55 |
| 12 | Great Britain (GBR-1) | Mark Tout; David Armstrong; Lenny Paul; Audley Richards | 57.22 | 58.26 | 56.86 | 57.56 | 3:49.90 |
| 13 | Canada (CAN-2) | Chris Lori; Ken LeBlanc; Andrew Swim; Howard Dell | 57.18 | 57.82 | 56.67 | 58.32 | 3:49.99 |
| 14 | West Germany (FRG-1) | Michael Sperr; Olaf Hampel; Florian Cruciger; Rolf Müller | 57.58 | 58.04 | 56.41 | 58.14 | 3:50.17 |
| 15 | Canada (CAN-1) | Greg Haydenluck; Cal Langford; Kevin Tyler; Lloyd Guss | 56.66 | 58.05 | 57.34 | 58.32 | 3:50.37 |
| 16 | United States (USA-2) | Brian Shimer; Jim Herberich; Matt Roy; Scott Pladel | 57.17 | 58.49 | 57.47 | 58.10 | 3:51.23 |
| 17 | Great Britain (GBR-2) | Tom De La Hunty; Colin Rattigan; George Robertson; Alec Leonce | 57.81 | 58.13 | 56.74 | 58.59 | 3:51.27 |
| 18 | Japan | Takao Sakai; Toshio Wakita; Yuji Yaku; Naomi Takewaki | 57.36 | 58.15 | 57.68 | 58.16 | 3:51.35 |
| 19 | Italy (ITA-2) | Roberto D'Amico; Thomas Rottensteiner; Paolo Scaramuzza; Andrea Meneghin | 57.69 | 58.65 | 57.50 | 58.04 | 3:51.88 |
| 20 | Romania | Csaba Nagy Lakatos; Grigore Anghel; Florian Olteanu; Costel Petrariu | 57.41 | 58.49 | 57.64 | 58.35 | 3:51.89 |
| 21 | New Zealand | Lex Peterson; Blair Telford; Rhys Dacre; Peter Henry | 57.98 | 58.42 | 57.30 | 58.67 | 3:52.37 |
| 22 | Chinese Taipei | Chen Chin-san; Chen Chin-sen; Lee Chen-tan; Wang Jauo-hueyi | 57.03 | 58.94 | 57.98 | 58.80 | 3:52.75 |
| 23 | Australia | Adrian Di Piazza; Martin Harland; Simon Dodd; Stephen Craig | 58.20 | 58.87 | 57.25 | 59.02 | 3:53.34 |
| 24 | Bulgaria | Tsvetozar Viktorov; Plamen Stamov; Nikolay Botev; Aleksandar Simeonov | 57.72 | 59.07 | 58.20 | 58.67 | 3:53.66 |
| 25 | Portugal | Antonio Reis; João Poupada; João Pires; Rogério Bernardes | 58.42 | 59.67 | 58.28 | 59.13 | 3:55.50 |
| - | Jamaica | Dudley Stokes; Devon Harris; Michael White; Chris Stokes | 58.04 | 59.37 | 1:03.19 | DNF | - |
