= Australia at the 1988 Winter Olympics =

- IOC code: AUS
- NOC: Australian Olympic Committee
- Website: www.olympics.com.au

in Calgary
- Competitors: 19 in 6 sports
- Flag bearer: Mike Richmond
- Medals: Gold 0 Silver 0 Bronze 0 Total 0

Winter Olympics appearances (overview)
- 1936; 1948; 1952; 1956; 1960; 1964; 1968; 1972; 1976; 1980; 1984; 1988; 1992; 1994; 1998; 2002; 2006; 2010; 2014; 2018; 2022; 2026

Australia competed at the 1988 Winter Olympics in Calgary, Alberta, Canada. Eighteen athletes participated, competing in alpine skiing, biathlon, cross-country skiing, figure skating, and speed skating, and for the first time bobsleigh. Australia's best result was tenth by Danny Kah in the 5000 metres speed skating.

Australia also participated in the demonstration sports of aerial freestyle skiing and short track speed skating.

There had earlier been hopes that Janine Shepherd would do well at these Olympics, but she was hit by a motorist and made a paraplegic while training for it.

== Competitors ==
The following is the list of number of competitors in the Games.

Sport	Men	Women	Total
Alpine skiing	3	0	3
Biathlon	1	–	1
Bobsleigh	5	–	5
Cross-country skiing	2	0	2
Figure skating	2	2	4
Speed skating	4	0	4
Total	17	2	19

== Alpine skiing ==
Men

Athlete	Event	Final					
Athlete	Event	Run 1	Rank	Run 2	Rank	Total	Rank
Peter Forras	Downhill	—N/a				did not finish	
Steven Lee	Downhill	—N/a				2:04.46	22
Steven Lee	Super G	—N/a				did not finish	
Steven Lee	Giant slalom	1:10.64	41	1:06.90	36	2:17.54	36
Richard Biggins	Super G	—N/a				1:47.38	31
Richard Biggins	Giant slalom	1:09.33	36	1:06.15	31	2:15.48	32
Richard Biggins	Slalom	did not finish					

Men's combined

Athlete	Downhill	Slalom		Total	
Athlete	Time	Time 1	Time 2	Points	Rank
Peter Forras	did not finish				
Steven Lee	did not finish				

== Biathlon ==
Men

Athlete	Event	Final		
Athlete	Event	Time	Misses	Rank
Andrew Paul	Individual	1:08:59.3	6	57
Andrew Paul	Sprint	30:36.6	1	62

== Bobsleigh ==
Athlete	Event	Run 1		Run 2		Run 3		Run 4		Total	
Athlete	Event	Time	Rank	Time	Rank	Time	Rank	Time	Rank	Time	Rank
Angus Stuart; Martin Harland	Two-man	59.21	26	60.15	18	61.38	24	60.49	24	4:01.23	23
Adrian Di Piazza; Simon Dodd	Two-man	60.03	33	60.94	31	61.23	21	60.41	23	4:02.61	26
Adrian Di Piazza; Martin Harland; Simon Dodd; Stephen Craig	Four-man	58.20	25	58.87	22	57.25	16	59.02	24	3:53.34	23

== Cross-country skiing ==
Men

Athlete	Event	Race	
Athlete	Event	Time	Rank
Chris Heberle	15 km classical	45:19.5	33
Chris Heberle	30 km classical	1:34:25.6	45
David Hislop	15 km classical	50:19.8	70
David Hislop	30 km classical	1:38:48.8	62

== Figure skating ==
Athlete(s)	Event	CD1	CF/CD2	SP/OD	FS/FD	Total	
Athlete(s)	Event	FP	FP	FP	FP	TFP	
Cameron Medhurst	Men's	—N/a	10.8	6.4	20.0	37.2	19
Tracy Brook	Ladies'	—N/a	15.6	9.2	did not advance		
Monica MacDonald & Rodney Clarke	Ice dance	12.0	8.0	20.0	40.0	20	

== Speed skating ==
This was the sixth Winter Olympics for Colin Coates, having competed in every Winter Olympics since 1968. Although registered as a competitor, he was regarded by the AOC as an official. General manager and Chef de Mission Geoff Henke later said about this arrangement

His own parent organisation, the Australian Skating Union, refused to endorse him as a competitor. I asked them several times if perhaps he could compete, but they said no; they felt they should concentrate on building potential for the future. Finally we did list him among the entries, but on the strict understanding that he would not compete ... The listing boosted team numbers on paper, allowing us to provide adequate numbers of support staff, but more importantly the competitor status meant that Colin would be able to share ice time with the speed skaters, train with them, give them the benefit of his experience.

He unsuccessfully tried to convince the Geoff to allow him to compete, saying "No Colin, it's not on. Your own sport won't nominate you, and that's the end of it. You're training with the athletes, but not skating in the Games. You've known that since we left Australia". After other rejected requests, he gave the impression of accepting the situation. "I had the power to take his entry out, and probably that's what I should have done. But I trusted him. He knew that he was not to compete." Instead, when the event was on, he put on a uniform and skated his best time ever.

I looked up, and all of a sudden I could see Colin. I thought at first it must have been an old video they were screening, but then I saw he had the current uniform on, and the realisation dawned that he was skating in the race, defying my orders. He had set the whole thing up behind my back. Some team members knew what he was up to. I actually leapt up and started running. I took off for the track, half a mile away through a tunnel. When I surfaced I was in the middle of the arena, ready to put my arms around his throat and drag him off. He was halfway through the event, the course announcer had mentioned that this was his sixth Games, and a lot of very enthusiastic people, including the King of Sweden, were cheering him on. I was as angry as I'd ever been, really wanting to bundle him off the course. Then I calmed down, and thought ... no, I'll finish up making history, too. I didn't want to do a Percy Cerutty kind of thing, so I waited until he finished.

After the race, Geoff ran on the ice without skates and reprimanded him:

I told him in no uncertain terms what I thought of him. I used words I'd never normally use. As far as I was concerned, he'd skated illegally. I'd helped him a lot in his own sport, and he'd let me down.

Coates wept in response. Colin then received congratulations for skating at six Olympics, including from the prime minister Bob Hawke. Geoff relented "At that point, I settled for discretion rather than valour. I stopped going crook. The man was a public hero. He did the wrong thing by me, but his was an incredible performance, and nobody could ever take that away from him."

Athlete	Event	Final	
Athlete	Event	Time	Rank
Mike Richmond	500 m	37.77	23
Mike Richmond	1000 m	1:14.61	14
Mike Richmond	1500 m	1:54.95	12
Phillip Tahmindjis	1000 m	1:16.38	31
Phillip Tahmindjis	1500 m	1:57.63	32
Danny Kah	1500 m	1:55.19	14
Danny Kah	5000 m	6:52.14	10
Colin Coates	10000 m	14:41.88	26

== See also ==
- Australia at the Winter Olympics
