= Speed skating at the 1988 Winter Olympics – Men's 500 metres =

Speed skating at the Olympics

Men's 500 metres at the XV Olympic Winter Games
- Pictogram for speed skating
- Venue: Olympic Oval
- Dates: 14 February 1988
- Competitors: 37 from 15 nations
- Winning time: 36.45 WR

Medalists
1st place, gold medalist(s)		Uwe-Jens Mey; East Germany
2nd place, silver medalist(s)		Jan Ykema; Netherlands
3rd place, bronze medalist(s)		Akira Kuroiwa; Japan

The men's 500 metres in speed skating at the 1988 Winter Olympics took place on 14 February, at the Olympic Oval.

== Records ==
Prior to this competition, the existing world and Olympic records were as follows:

World record	Nick Thometz (USA)	36.55	Heerenveen, Netherlands	19 March 1987
Olympic record	Eric Heiden (USA)	38.03	Lake Placid, United States	15 February 1980

The following new world and olympic records was set.

Date	Pair	Athlete	Country	Time	OR	WR
14 February	Pair 1	Jan Ykema	Netherlands	36.76	OR	
14 February	Pair 4	Uwe-Jens Mey	East Germany	36.45	OR	WR

== Results ==
Rank	Pair	Athlete	Country	Time	Difference	Notes
1st place, gold medalist(s)	4	Uwe-Jens Mey	East Germany	36.45	–	WR
2nd place, silver medalist(s)	1	Jan Ykema	Netherlands	36.76	+0.31	
3rd place, bronze medalist(s)	4	Akira Kuroiwa	Japan	36.77	+0.32	
4	3	Sergey Fokichev	Soviet Union	36.82	+0.37	
5	18	Bae Ki-tae	South Korea	36.90	+0.45	
6	5	Igor Zhelezovski	Soviet Union	36.94	+0.49	
7	1	Guy Thibault	Canada	36.96	+0.51	
8	3	Nick Thometz	United States	37.16	+0.71	
9	5	Yasumitsu Kanehama	Japan	37.25	+0.80	
10	11	Frode Rønning	Norway	37.31	+0.86	
11	2	Yasushi Kuroiwa	Japan	37.34	+0.89	
12	17	Vitaliy Makovetskiy	Soviet Union	37.35	+0.90	
13	10	Kimihiro Hamaya	Japan	37.38	+0.93	
14	14	Gaétan Boucher	Canada	37.47	+1.02	
15	6	Erik Henriksen	United States	37.50	+1.05	
16	7	Menno Boelsma	Netherlands	37.52	+1.07	
17	17	Daniel Turcotte	Canada	37.60	+1.15	
18	11	Bjørn Hagen	Norway	37.69	+1.24	
18	10	Göran Johansson	Sweden	37.69	+1.24	
20	7	Hans-Peter Oberhuber	West Germany	37.73	+1.28	
21	8	André Hoffmann	East Germany	37.75	+1.30	
22	6	Marty Pierce	United States	37.76	+1.31	
23	9	Mike Richmond	Australia	37.77	+1.32	
24	8	Hein Vergeer	Netherlands	37.80	+1.35	
25	13	Jerzy Dominik	Poland	37.83	+1.38	
26	13	Michael Hadschieff	Austria	37.90	+1.45	
27	9	Uwe Streb	West Germany	38.03	+1.58	
28	15	Peter Adeberg	East Germany	38.11	+1.66	
29	19	Robert Tremblay	Canada	38.34	+1.89	
30	12	Hans Magnusson	Sweden	38.60	+2.15	
31	12	Claude Nicouleau	France	38.63	+2.18	
32	15	Claes Bengtsson	Sweden	38.66	+2.21	
33	16	Hans van Helden	France	39.05	+2.60	
34	14	Christian Eminger	Austria	39.70	+3.25	
35	16	Behudin Merdović	Yugoslavia	56.21		
36	18	Nikolay Gulyayev	Soviet Union	62.86		
-	2	Dan Jansen	United States	DNF		
