= Cross-country skiing at the 1988 Winter Olympics – Men's 30 kilometre classical =

Skiing competition

Men's 30 kilometre classical at the XV Olympic Winter Games
- Venue: Canmore Nordic Centre Provincial Park
- Dates: 15 February 1988
- Competitors: 91 from 32 nations
- Winning time: 1:24:26.3

Medalists
1st place, gold medalist(s)		Alexey Prokurorov; Soviet Union
2nd place, silver medalist(s)		Vladimir Smirnov; Soviet Union
3rd place, bronze medalist(s)		Vegard Ulvang; Norway

The men's 30 kilometre classical cross-country skiing competition at the 1988 Winter Olympics in Calgary, Canada, was held on Monday 15 February at the Canmore Nordic Centre in Canmore.

The skiers started at 30-second intervals, then skiing the entire 30-kilometre course. The Swede Thomas Wassberg was the 1987 World champion and Nikolay Zimyatov of the Soviet Union was the defending Olympic champion from 1984 Olympics in Sarajevo, Yugoslavia.

== Results ==
Rank	Bib	Name	Country	Time	Deficit
1st place, gold medalist(s)	28	Alexey Prokurorov	Soviet Union	1:24:26.3	–
2nd place, silver medalist(s)	78	Vladimir Smirnov	Soviet Union	1:24:35.1	+8.8
3rd place, bronze medalist(s)	80	Vegard Ulvang	Norway	1:25:11.6	+45.3
4	71	Mikhail Devyatyarov	Soviet Union	1:25:31.3	+1:05.0
5	77	Giorgio Vanzetta	Italy	1:25:37.2	+1:10.9
6	54	Pål Gunnar Mikkelsplass	Norway	1:25:44.6	+1:18.3
7	49	Gianfranco Polvara	Italy	1:26:02.7	+1:36.4
8	74	Marco Albarello	Italy	1:26:09.1	+1:42.8
9	33	Harri Kirvesniemi	Finland	1:26:59.6	+2:33.3
10	82	Gunde Svan	Sweden	1:27:30.8	+3:04.5
11	18	Torgny Mogren	Sweden	1:27:55.7	+3:29.4
12	1	Yuriy Burlakov	Soviet Union	1:28:02.4	+3:36.1
13	45	Giachem Guidon	Switzerland	1:28:05.9	+3:39.6
14	87	Pierre Harvey	Canada	1:28:21.7	+3:55.4
15	90	Uwe Bellmann	East Germany	1:28:37.2	+4:10.9
16	57	Jan Ottosson	Sweden	1:28:51.7	+4:25.4
17	27	Ladislav Švanda	Czechoslovakia	1:28:55.1	+4:28.8
18	24	Alois Schwarz	Austria	1:29:34.4	+5:08.1
19	64	Aki Karvonen	Finland	1:29:49.5	+5:23.2
20	26	Kazunari Sasaki	Japan	1:29:59.2	+5:32.9
21	46	Tor Håkon Holte	Norway	1:29:59.5	+5:33.2
22	56	Holger Bauroth	East Germany	1:30:03.4	+5:37.1
23	34	Jochen Behle	West Germany	1:30:08.3	+5:42.0
24	16	Guy Balland	France	1:30:20.4	+5:54.1
25	15	Radim Nyč	Czechoslovakia	1:30:34.4	+6:08.1
26	8	Jeremias Wigger	Switzerland	1:30:47.1	+6:20.8
27	5	Kari Ristanen	Finland	1:31:05.2	+6:38.9
28	10	Svetoslav Atanasov	Bulgaria	1:31:15.7	+6:49.4
29	88	Petr Lisičan	Czechoslovakia	1:31:23.1	+6:56.8
30	70	Jürg Capol	Switzerland	1:31:35.8	+7:09.5
31	3	Martin Hole	Norway	1:31:47.5	+7:21.2
32	68	Martin Petrásek	Czechoslovakia	1:31:56.1	+7:29.8
33	63	Alois Stadlober	Austria	1:32:00.0	+7:33.7
34	51	Janež Kršinar	Yugoslavia	1:32:02.1	+7:35.8
35	52	Yves Bilodeau	Canada	1:32:17.8	+7:51.5
36	69	Ivan Smilenov	Bulgaria	1:32:26.9	+8:00.6
37	91	Atsushi Egawa	Japan	1:32:35.4	+8:09.1
38	22	Silvano Barco	Italy	1:32:41.8	+8:15.5
39	20	Al Pilcher	Canada	1:33:04.7	+8:38.4
40	65	Stefan Dotzler	West Germany	1:33:06.1	+8:39.8
41	32	Todor Makhov	Bulgaria	1:33:25.5	+8:59.2
42	43	Thomas Wassberg	Sweden	1:34:07.6	+9:41.3
43	81	Claude Pierrat	France	1:34:15.6	+9:49.3
44	14	Johann Standmann	Austria	1:34:24.8	+9:58.5
45	53	Chris Heberle	Australia	1:34:25.6	+9:59.3
46	37	Wayne Dustin	Canada	1:34:37.8	+10:11.5
47	55	Benjamin Eberle	Liechtenstein	1:34:53.8	+10:27.5
48	84	Mano Ketenzhiev	Bulgaria	1:34:57.0	+10:30.7
49	73	Dan Simoneau	United States	1:35:21.4	+10:55.1
50	58	Dominique Locatelli	France	1:35:40.0	+11:13.7
51	12	Jon Engen	United States	1:35:41.9	+11:15.6
52	75	Jari Laukkanen	Finland	1:35:51.6	+11:25.3
53	23	Sašo Grajf	Yugoslavia	1:36:19.2	+11:52.9
54	36	John Spotswood	Great Britain	1:36:42.7	+12:16.4
55	60	Park Ki-Ho	South Korea	1:36:43.9	+12:17.6
56	25	Kevin Brochman	United States	1:37:07.1	+12:40.8
57	72	Tanayuki Yuki	Japan	1:37:11.9	+12:45.6
58	7	Konstantin Ritter	Liechtenstein	1:37:47.6	+13:21.3
59	2	José Giro	Spain	1:38:01.5	+13:35.2
60	19	Jeon Yeung-Hae	South Korea	1:38:05.3	+13:39.0
61	13	Martin Watkins	Great Britain	1:38:30.3	+14:04.0
62	42	David Hislop	Australia	1:38:48.8	+14:22.5
63	47	Gabor Mayer	Hungary	1:39:03.5	+14:37.2
64	31	Jun Zhao	China	1:39:13.9	+14:47.6
65	61	Einar Ólafsson	Iceland	1:39:56.3	+15:30.0
66	62	Patrick Winterton	Great Britain	1:39:57.6	+15:31.3
67	89	Ewan McKenzie	Great Britain	1:40:06.7	+15:40.4
68	40	Patrick Rémy	France	1:40:24.5	+15:58.2
69	48	Dambajantsagiin Battulga	Mongolia	1:40:41.3	+16:15.0
70	4	Christos Titas	Greece	1:41:25.7	+16:59.4
71	44	Julio Moreschi	Argentina	1:41:40.3	+17:14.0
72	66	Ziitsagaany Ganbat	Mongolia	1:42:24.2	+17:57.9
73	29	Hong Kun-Pyo	South Korea	1:43:26.4	+19:00.1
74	35	Patrik Hasler	Liechtenstein	1:43:26.7	+19:00.4
75	76	Cho Sung-Hoon	South Korea	1:43:30.3	+19:04.0
76	67	Athanasios Tsakiris	Greece	1:43:55.1	+19:28.8
77	11	Masaharu Yamazaki	Japan	1:43:58.3	+19:32.0
78	86	Saim Koca	Turkey	1:44:55.7	+20:29.4
79	50	Abdullah Yilmaz	Turkey	1:46:48.2	+22:21.9
80	6	Dag Burgos	Guatemala	1:47:38.5	+23:12.2
81	17	Fikret Ören	Turkey	1:49:30.2	+25:03.9
82	41	Nikos Anastassiadis	Greece	1:50:10.7	+25:44.4
83	30	Ricardo Burgos	Guatemala	1:51:19.4	+26:53.1
84	59	Erhan Dursum	Turkey	1:56:10.7	+31:44.4
85	21	Roberto Alvárez	Mexico	2:09:34.8	+45:08.5
86	9	Andrea Sammaritani	San Marino	2:15:07.7	+50:41.4
87	39	Arturo Kinch	Costa Rica	2:16:20.2	+51:53.9
	38	Jordi Ribó	Spain	DNF	
	79	Andi Grünenfelder	Switzerland	DNF	
	85	Joe Galanes	United States	DNF	
	83	Markus Gandler	Austria	DNS	
