= Speed skating at the 1988 Winter Olympics – Men's 1000 metres =

Speed skating at the Olympics

Men's 1000 metres at the XV Olympic Winter Games
- Pictogram for speed skating
- Venue: Olympic Oval
- Dates: 18 February 1988
- Competitors: 40 from 16 nations
- Winning time: 1:13.03 OR

Medalists
1st place, gold medalist(s)		Nikolay Gulyayev; Soviet Union
2nd place, silver medalist(s)		Uwe-Jens Mey; East Germany
3rd place, bronze medalist(s)		Igor Zhelezovski; Soviet Union

The men's 1000 metres in speed skating at the 1988 Winter Olympics took place on 18 February, at the Olympic Oval.

== Records ==
Prior to this competition, the existing world and Olympic records were as follows:

World record	Pavel Pegov (URS)	1:12.58	Alma-Ata, Kazakh SSR, Soviet Union	25 March 1983
Olympic record	Eric Heiden (USA)	1:15.18	Lake Placid, United States	19 February 1980

The following new World and Olympic records was set during the competition.

Date	Pair	Athlete	Country	Time	OR	WR
18 February	Pair 2	Yasumitsu Kanehama	Japan	1:14.36	OR	
18 February	Pair 3	Nikolay Gulyayev	Soviet Union	1:13.03	OR	

== Results ==
Rank	Pair	Lane	Athlete	Country	Time	Time behind	Notes
1st place, gold medalist(s)	3	i	Nikolay Gulyayev	Soviet Union	1:13.03	-	OR
2nd place, silver medalist(s)	5	o	Uwe-Jens Mey	East Germany	1:13.11	+0.08	
3rd place, bronze medalist(s)	5	i	Igor Zhelezovski	Soviet Union	1:13.19	+0.16	
4	6	i	Eric Flaim	United States	1:13.53	+0.50	
5	19	i	Gaétan Boucher	Canada	1:13.77	+0.74	
6	12	o	Michael Hadschieff	Austria	1:13.84	+0.81	
7	4	i	Guy Thibault	Canada	1:14.16	+1.13	
8	13	i	Peter Adeberg	East Germany	1:14.19	+1.16	
9	20	i	Bae Ki-tae	South Korea	1:14.36	+1.33	
9	2	o	Yasumitsu Kanehama	Japan	1:14.36	+1.33	
11	15	o	Andrey Bakhvalov	Soviet Union	1:14.39	+1.36	
12	20	o	Boris Repnin	Soviet Union	1:14.41	+1.38	
13	3	o	Kimihiro Hamaya	Japan	1:14.43	+1.40	
14	9	o	Mike Richmond	Australia	1:14.61	+1.58	
15	8	i	André Hoffmann	East Germany	1:14.62	+1.59	
15	11	i	Hein Vergeer	Netherlands	1:14.62	+1.59	
17	2	i	Tom Cushman	United States	1:14.68	+1.65	
18	1	i	Nick Thometz	United States	1:14.71	+1.68	
19	17	o	Jean Pichette	Canada	1:14.72	+1.69	
20	1	o	Akira Kuroiwa	Japan	1:15.05	+2.02	
21	15	i	Claes Bengtsson	Sweden	1:15.07	+2.04	
22	14	i	Marcel Tremblay	Canada	1:15.13	+2.10	
23	8	o	Yukihiro Mitani	Japan	1:15.28	+2.25	
24	10	i	Menno Boelsma	Netherlands	1:15.34	+2.31	
25	9	i	Frode Rønning	Norway	1:15.39	+2.36	
26	16	i	Rolf Falk-Larssen	Norway	1:15.42	+2.39	
27	14	o	Hans Magnusson	Sweden	1:15.79	+2.76	
28	18	i	Jerzy Dominik	Poland	1:16.16	+3.13	
29	19	o	Hans van Helden	France	1:16.32	+3.29	
30	10	o	Göran Johansson	Sweden	1:16.33	+3.30	
31	12	i	Phillip Tahmindjis	Australia	1:16.38	+3.35	
32	7	o	Hans-Peter Oberhuber	West Germany	1:16.62	+3.59	
33	13	o	Claude Nicouleau	France	1:17.91	+4.88	
34	17	i	Craig McNicoll	Great Britain	1:18.60	+5.57	
35	15	o	Behudin Merdović	Yugoslavia	1:23.88	+10.85	
36	16	o	Julian Green	Great Britain	1:57.30	+44.27	
-	7	i	Bjørn Hagen	Norway	DNF		
-	4	o	Dan Jansen	United States	DNF		
-	6	o	Jan Ykema	Netherlands	DNF		
-	11	o	Uwe Streb	West Germany	DQ		
