= Muigg =

Muigg is a surname of Austrian origin. Notable people with the surname include:

- Josef Muigg (born 1960), Austrian bobsledder
- Theresa Muigg (born 1984), Austrian politician

== See also ==
- Muggia
