= Stephen Craig =

Stephen or Steve Craig may refer to:

- Stephen Lyle Craig, first and current husband of Marie Osmond
- Stephen Craig (bobsleigh) (born 1967), Australian bobsledder
- Stephen L. Craig, American chemist and professor
- Steve Craig (American football), American football player
- Steve Craig (politician), Canadian politician
- Steven Craig, Scottish footballer
