= Heinrich Ott =

Heinrich Ott may refer to:

- Heinrich Ott (physicist) (1894–1962), German physicist
- Heinrich Ott (bobsledder), Swiss bobsledder, fl. late 1980s
