= Vollath =

Vollath may refer to:

- Bettina Vollath (born 1962), Austrian politician
- René Vollath (born 1990), German professional footballer
- Sarah Vollath (born 1995), German politician

== See also ==
- Vorath
