= Dipiazza =

Dipiazza or Di Piazza is a surname. Notable people with the surname include:

== Dipiazza ==
- Jodi DiPiazza (born 2001), American singer
- Roberto Dipiazza (born 1953), Italian politician
- Samuel DiPiazza, American business executive

== Di Piazza ==
- Adrian Di Piazza (born 1962), Australian bobsledder
- Dominique Di Piazza (born 1959), French electric bass player
- Matteo Di Piazza (born 1988), Italian footballer

== See also ==
- Piazza (disambiguation)
