= Roberto D'Amico =

Roberto D'Amico may refer to:

- Roberto D'Amico (bobsledder) (born 1961), Italian bobsledder
- Roberto d'Amico (politician) (born 1967), Belgian politician
