= Beerli =

Beerli is a Swiss surname. Notable people with the surname include:

- Christine Beerli (born 1953), Swiss politician
- Roland Beerli, Swiss bobsledder
- Joseph Beerli (1901–1967), Swiss bobsledder
- Walter Beerli (1928–1995), Swiss footballer
