= Werner Stocker =

Werner Stocker may refer to:

- Werner Stocker (actor) (1955–1993), actor from Germany
- Werner Stocker (bobsledder) (born 1961), bobsledder from Switzerland
