= Thomas Cushman =

Thomas or Tom Cushman may refer to:

- Thomas Cushman (Plymouth colonist) (1607/08–1691), leader in Plymouth Colony, New England
- Thomas Cushman (sociologist) (born 1959), American sociologist
- Thomas J. Cushman (1895–1972), American Marine Corps aviator and general officer
- Tom Cushman (born 1964), American speed skater
