= Mike Richmond =

Mike Richmond may refer to:

- Mike Richmond (musician) (born 1948), American jazz bassist
- Mike Richmond (speed skater) (born 1960)
