= Fassler =

Fassler or Fässler is a surname. Notable people with the surname include:

- Hanspeter Fässler (born 1957), Swiss robotics pioneer and manager
- Hildegard Fässler (born 1951), Swiss politician
- Marcel Fässler (racing driver) (born 1976), Swiss racing driver
- Marcel Fässler (bobsleigh) (born 1959), Swiss bobsledder
- Margot Fassler American music historian
