= Marcel Fässler =

Marcel Fässler may refer to:

- Marcel Fässler (bobsledder) (born 1959), Swiss bobsledder who competed in the late 1980s
- Marcel Fässler (racing driver) (born 1976), Swiss sportscar racing driver
