= Wang Jauo-hueyi =

Taiwanese bobsledder

Personal information
- Nationality: Taiwanese
- Born: 12 February 1966 (age 59)

Sport
- Sport: Bobsleigh

Wang Jauo-hueyi (born 12 February 1966) is a Taiwanese bobsledder. He competed in the four man event at the 1988 Winter Olympics.
