= Marcel Tremblay (speed skater) =

Canadian speed skater (born 1965)

Personal information
- Born: 12 June 1965 (age 59); Sherbrooke, Quebec, Canada

Sport
- Sport: Speed skating

Marcel Tremblay (born 12 June 1965) is a Canadian speed skater. He competed in the men's 1000 metres event at the 1988 Winter Olympics.
