= FIBT World Championships 1987 =

Bobsleigh world championships

1987 World Championships
- Location: St. Moritz, Switzerland

The FIBT World Championships 1987 took place in St. Moritz, Switzerland for the record fifteenth time. The Swiss city had hosted the event previously in 1931 (Four-man), 1935 (Four-man), 1937 (Four-man), 1938 (Two-man), 1939 (Two-man), 1947, 1955, 1957, 1959, 1965, 1970, 1974, 1977, and 1982. The skeleton event that was at the 1982 championships was not included at this one when the championships returned to St. Moritz.

== Two man bobsleigh ==
Pos	Team	Time
Gold	Switzerland (Ralph Pichler, Celest Poltera)	4:22.65 min
Silver	Switzerland (Hans Hiltebrand, André Kisser)	4:22.91 min
Silver	East Germany (Wolfgang Hoppe, Dietmar Schauerhammer)	4:22.91 min

== Four man bobsleigh ==
Pos	Team	Time
Gold	Switzerland (Hans Hiltebrand, Urs Fehlmann, Erwin Fassbind, André Kisser)	
Silver	East Germany (Wolfgang Hoppe, Bogdan Musioł, Roland Wetzig, Dietmar Schauerhammer)	
Bronze	Switzerland (Ralph Pichler, Heinrich Ott, Edgar Dietsche, Celest Poltera)	

== Medal table ==
* Host nation (Switzerland)

Rank	Nation	Gold	Silver	Bronze	Total
1	Switzerland (SUI)*	2	1	1	4
2	East Germany (GDR)	0	2	0	2
Totals (2 entries)		2	3	1	6
