= Edgar Dietsche =

Swiss bobsledder

Medal record

Bobsleigh

World Championships
Bronze medal – third place	1987 St. Moritz	Four-man

Edgar Dietsche was a Swiss bobsledder who competed during the late 1980s. He won the bronze medals in the four-man event at the 1987 FIBT World Championships in St. Moritz. He died on May 24, 2010.
