= Andrew Swim =

Canadian bobsledder (born 1961)

Personal information
- Nationality: (Canada) Canadian
- Born: 20 February 1961 (age 64) Saint John, New Brunswick, Canada

Sport
- Country: Canada
- Sport: Bobsleigh

Andrew Swim (born 20 February 1961) is a Canadian bobsledder. He competed in the four man event at the 1988 Winter Olympics.
