= Celest Poltera =

Swiss bobsledder

- Poltera (left) in 2026

Personal information
- Born: November 1, 1963 Switzerland
Medal record
Bobsleigh
World Championships
Gold medal – first place	1987 St. Moritz	Two-man
Silver medal – second place	1986 Königssee	Two-man
Bronze medal – third place	1986 Königssee	Four-man
Bronze medal – third place	1987 St. Moritz	Four-man

Celest Poltera is a Swiss bobsledder who competed in the late 1980s. He won four medals at the FIBT World Championships with one gold (Two-man: 1987), one silver (Two-man: 1986), and two bronzes (Four-man: 1986, 1987).
