= FIBT World Championships 1986 =

Bobsleigh and skeleton world championships

1986 World Championships
- Location: Königssee, West Germany

The FIBT World Championships 1986 took place in Königssee, West Germany for the second time, having hosted the event previously in 1979.

== Two man bobsleigh ==
Pos	Team	Time
Gold	East Germany (Wolfgang Hoppe, Dietmar Schauerhammer)	
Silver	Switzerland (Ralph Pichler, Celest Poltera)	
Bronze	East Germany (Detlef Richter, Steffen Grummt)	

== Four man bobsleigh ==
Pos	Team	Time
Gold	Switzerland (Erich Schärer, Kurt Meier, Erwin Fassbind, André Kisser)	
Silver	Austria (Peter Kienast, Franz Siegl, Gerhard Redl, Christian Mark)	
Bronze	Switzerland (Ralph Pichler, Heinrich Notter, Celest Poltera, Roland Beerli)	

== Medal table ==
Rank	Nation	Gold	Silver	Bronze	Total
1	Switzerland (SUI)	1	1	1	3
2	East Germany (GDR)	1	0	1	2
3	Austria (AUT)	0	1	0	1
Totals (3 entries)		2	2	2	6
