= Rogério Bernardes =

Portuguese bobsledder (born 1964)

Personal information
- Nationality: Portuguese
- Born: 25 March 1964 (age 61)

Sport
- Sport: Bobsleigh

Rogério Bernardes (born 25 March 1964) is a Portuguese bobsledder. He competed in the four man event at the 1988 Winter Olympics.
