= Heinrich Notter =

Swiss bobsledder

Medal record

Bobsleigh

World Championships
Bronze medal – third place	1986 Königssee	Four-man

Heinrich Notter is a Swiss bobsledder who won competed during the 1980s. He won a bronze medal in the four-man event at the 1986 FIBT World Championships in Königssee.
