= André Kiser =

Swiss bobsledder (born 1958)

Personal information
- Nationality: Swiss
- Born: 10 April 1958 (age 68)

Sport
- Sport: Bobsleigh
Medal record
Representing Switzerland
Bobsleigh
World Championships
Gold medal – first place	1986 Königssee	Four-man
Gold medal – first place	1987 St. Moritz	Four-man
Silver medal – second place	1987 St. Moritz	Two-man

André Kiser (born 10 April 1958) is a Swiss bobsledder. He competed in the two man and the four man events at the 1988 Winter Olympics. He also won three medals at the FIBT World Championships with two golds (Four-man: 1986, 1987) and one silver (Two-man: 1987).
