= Petr Lisičan =

Czech cross-country skier

Personal information
- Nationality: Czech
- Born: 5 June 1962; Polička, Czechoslovakia
- Died: 22 April 2012 (aged 49)

Sport
- Sport: Cross-country skiing

Petr Lisičan (5 June 1962 – 22 April 2012) was a Czech cross-country skier. He competed in the men's 30 kilometre classical event at the 1988 Winter Olympics.
