= Scott Pladel =

American bobsledder

Personal information
- Nationality: American
- Born: November 25, 1962 (age 63) Albany, New York, United States

Sport
- Sport: Bobsleigh

Scott Pladel (born November 25, 1962) is an American bobsledder. He competed in the four man event at the 1988 Winter Olympics.
