= Robert Tremblay =

Canadian speed skater

Personal information
- Born: 12 June 1965 (age 59); Sherbrooke, Quebec, Canada

Sport
- Sport: Speed skating

Robert Tremblay (born 12 June 1965) is a Canadian speed skater. He competed in the men's 500 metres event at the 1988 Winter Olympics.
