= Plamen Stamov =

Bulgarian bobsledder

Personal information
- Nationality: Bulgarian
- Born: 14 January 1954 (age 71)

Sport
- Sport: Bobsleigh

Plamen Stamov (Bulgarian: Пламен Стамов, born 14 January 1954) is a Bulgarian bobsledder. He competed in the four man event at the 1988 Winter Olympics.
