= Florian Cruciger =

German bobsledder

Personal information
- Nationality: German
- Born: 23 April 1958 (age 67) Munich, West Germany

Sport
- Sport: Bobsleigh

Florian Cruciger (born 23 April 1958) is a German bobsledder. He competed in the four man event at the 1988 Winter Olympics. The same year he won his only German national title with the four-man bob. Cruciger was originally a track and field athlete, where he specialized in decathlon with a personal best of 7,206 points.

He is a trained carpenter and later became a furniture dealer.
