= Bill White (bobsleigh) =

American bobsledder

Personal information
- Full name: William Harrison "Bill" White, III
- Born: December 6, 1959 (age 66) Chicago, Illinois, United States
- Height: 178 cm (5 ft 10 in)
- Weight: 77 kg (170 lb; 12 st 2 lb)

Sport
- Sport: Bobsleigh

Bill White (born December 6, 1959) is an American bobsledder. He competed in the four man event at the 1988 Winter Olympics. Bill White ran track and played football at Wasson High School in Colorado Springs. He then attended the University of Northern Colorado where he was on the track team, running sprints, with a 100 meter PR of 10.65. White earned MVP honors in the North Central Conference in track for three years. He was recruited to the US bobsled team because of his speed and athletic ability, leading to good push times. At the time he was a Captain in the US Air Force, stationed at Hanscom Field in Massachusetts.
