= Boris Katchouk =

Canadian ice hockey player (born 1998)

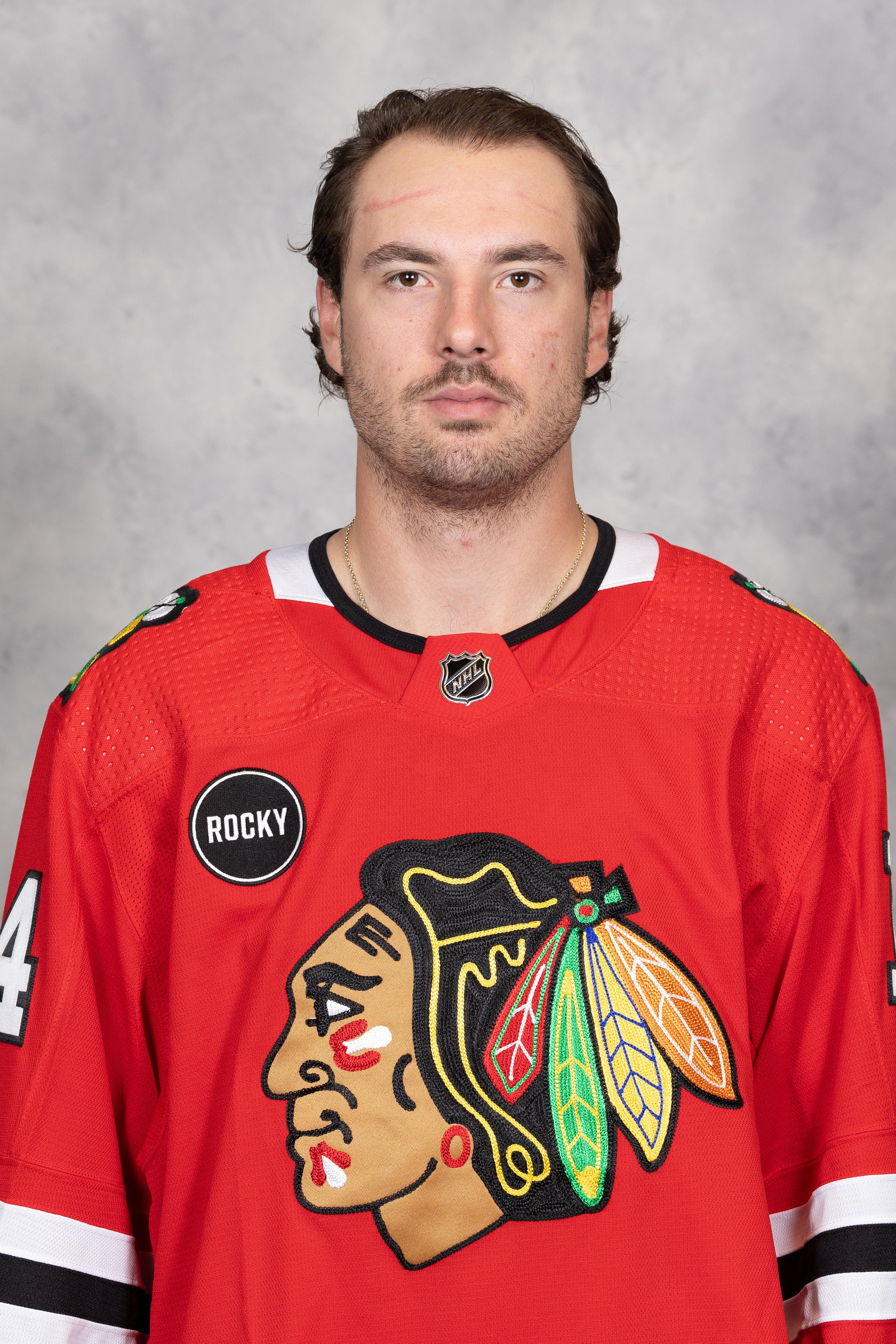
- Katchouk with the Chicago Blackhawks in 2023
- Born: June 18, 1998 (age 28) Vancouver, British Columbia, Canada
- Height: 6 ft 2 in (188 cm)
- Weight: 212 lb (96 kg; 15 st 2 lb)
- Position: Winger
- Shoots: Left
- KHL team Former teams: Traktor Chelyabinsk; Tampa Bay Lightning; Chicago Blackhawks; Ottawa Senators
- NHL draft: 44th overall, 2016; Tampa Bay Lightning
- Playing career: 2018–present

Boris Katchouk (born June 18, 1998) is a Canadian professional ice hockey winger for Traktor Chelyabinsk of the Kontinental Hockey League (KHL). Katchouk was selected by Tampa Bay Lightning in the second round, 44th overall, of the 2016 NHL entry draft. He has also played for the Chicago Blackhawks and Ottawa Senators.

== Early life ==
Katchouk was born on June 18, 1998, in Vancouver, Canada to Russian parents, Yelena Tumanova and Viktor Katchouk, and grew up alongside his two older brothers, Alex and Yuri. His mother Yelena represented the Soviet Union in speed skating at the 1988 Winter Olympics. His family moved from Russia to Canada for work in 1992 and moved from Montreal to Vancouver before settling down in Waterloo, Ontario. He holds Canadian and Russian dual citizenship.

Growing up, Katchouk was a dual athlete as he played both ice hockey and box lacrosse.

== Playing career ==
Katchouk began his ice hockey career with the Waterloo Wolves Minor Midget team in the Alliance Hockey League. During the 2013–14 season, he recorded 25 goals and 33 assists for 58 points through 29 games while also guiding the team to an AHMMPL Championship. Following this, he joined the Northern Ontario Junior Hockey League (NOJHL)'s Soo Thunderbirds and led them to the James Aspin Trophy, Copeland Cup McNamara Trophy, and Dudley Hewitt Cup. During the Dudley Hewitt Cup tournament, Katchouk led all Thunderbird players in scoring with six points. During this time, he also attended Resurrection Catholic Secondary School before being drafted by the Sault Ste. Marie Greyhounds of the Ontario Hockey League (OHL). He played 12 games with the Greyhounds as a 16-year-old during the 2014–15 OHL season but fully began his career the following year.

=== Major junior ===
Upon joining the Greyhounds for the 2015–16 season, Katchouk recorded 24 goals and 27 assists for 51 points in 63 games. During his rookie season, Katchouk was automatically suspended for two games as a result of a fight with Niki Petti. He concluded the season by being selected to the OHL's All-Rookie Team and being named the Greyhounds' Rookie of the Year. In his National Hockey League (NHL) draft eligible year, Katchouk earned a 25th final ranking amongst North American skaters by the NHL Central Scouting Bureau prior to the 2016 NHL entry draft. He was eventually drafted in the second round, 44th overall, by the Tampa Bay Lightning and participated in their training camp.

Katchouk returned to the Greyhounds for his sophomore season, where he recorded 35 goals and 64 points in 66 games. As the team qualified for the 2017 OHL playoffs, he led all Greyhounds skaters in both goals and points through 11 games, and was then signed to a three-year, entry-level contract by the Lightning on April 23. The following year, Katchouk again helped the Greyhounds qualify for the 2018 OHL playoffs. During their series against the Owen Sound Attack, Katchouk scored a hat trick to help lift the Greyhounds to a Game 7 win and qualify for the OHL's Western Conference final.

=== Professional ===
Following his major junior career, Katchouk was assigned to the Lightning's American Hockey League (AHL) affiliate, the Syracuse Crunch. He scored his first professional career goal in his debut against the Rochester Americans. During the latter part of the season, Katchouk experienced an 11-game goal-scoring drought which he broke on March 29, 2019, against the Providence Bruins. At the time of the goal, he had recorded 22 points throughout the season including three-multi point games. Katchouk returned to the AHL for the 2020–21 season, appearing in 29 games, scoring 11 goals and 34 points, leading the team in assists and plus/minus.

On July 31, 2021, Katchouk signed a three-year contract to remain with the Lightning organization. After attending the Lightning's training camp and participating in pre-season games, Katchouk was named to their opening night roster. On October 16, Katchouk made his NHL debut in a 7–6 Lightning overtime victory against the Detroit Red Wings at Little Caesars Arena. On November 13, Katchouk recorded his first career NHL assist and point against the Florida Panthers. On December 5, Katchouk recorded his first career NHL goal against Carter Hart in a 7–1 Lightning win over the Philadelphia Flyers. He played in 37 games, scoring two goals and six points with the Lightning before being assigned to the Crunch for a conditioning assignment on March 10, 2022. After playing in three games, he was recalled by Tampa Bay on March 14. He appeared in one more game with the Lightning.

On March 18, 2022, the Lightning, looking to bolster their offense for an upcoming playoff run, traded Katchouk along with teammate Taylor Raddysh and two first-round picks in 2023 and 2024 to the Chicago Blackhawks in exchange for forward Brandon Hagel and two fourth-round draft picks. Katchouk made his Blackhawks debut on March 19 in a 3–1 loss to the Minnesota Wild. He scored his first goal with Chicago on April 10 against Jake Oettinger in a 6–4 loss to the Dallas Stars. Katchouk suffered a left ankle sprain in a 2022 pre-season game versus the Detroit Red Wings that caused him to miss the first month of the 2022–23 season. Katchouk made his season debut against the Buffalo Sabres on October 29. Katchouk got his first goal and first point of the season on November 30 in a 5–4 loss to the Edmonton Oilers. On March 14, 2023, Katchouk registered his first three-point game, scoring one goal and assisting on two others in a 6–3 win over the Boston Bruins.

Katchouk began the 2023–24 season with Chicago, but after 17 games, he had recorded only two goals and four points. His poor play led him to be placed on waivers by the Blackhawks. After going unclaimed, he was assigned to the Blackhawks AHL affiliate, the Rockford IceHogs, on December 12, 2023. After appearing in six games with Rockford, scoring three goals and five points, Katchouk was recalled by Chicago after Raddysh was placed on injured reserve on December 30, 2023. He played in eleven more games with Chicago, scoring three more goals and five points.

On March 7, 2024, Katchouk was placed on waivers again by the Blackhawks. The following day, he was claimed by the Ottawa Senators. He made his Senators debut on March 9 in a 2–1 loss to the San Jose Sharks. Katchouk scored his first goal and registered his first multi-point game with the Senators in a 6–2 win over the Buffalo Sabres on March 27. As a restricted free agent the end of the season, the Senators did not give him a qualifying offer, making him an unrestricted free agent.

As a free agent, Katchouk went un-signed in the 2024 offseason before he accepted an invitation to attend the Anaheim Ducks training camp for the 2024–25 season on a professional tryout (PTO) on September 12, 2024. He was released from his PTO on September 30. He signed a one-year AHL contract with the Wilkes-Barre/Scranton Penguins on October 8. He notched professional season best offensive totals with the Penguins, posting 21 goals and 49 points through 67 regular season games.

After a rebound season in the AHL with Wilkes-Barre, Katchouk as a free agent secured a one-year, two-way NHL contract with his original club, the Tampa Bay Lightning, on July 1, 2025.

On December 28, 2025, Katchouk was traded to the Minnesota Wild in exchange for Michael Milne. He played exclusively with AHL affiliate, the Iowa Wild, posting 3 points through 8 games. On March 1, 2026, Katchouk was traded by the Wild to the Philadelphia Flyers in exchange for defenceman Roman Schmidt.

On August 13, 2026, Katchouk signed a one-year contract with Traktor Chelyabinsk of the Kontinental Hockey League.

== International play ==
Medal record

Men's ice hockey

Representing Canada

IIHF World U20 Championship
Gold medal – first place	2018 United States	

Katchouk was a member of Team Canada at 2016 Under-18 Championships in Grand Forks, North Dakota, United States. He made Team Canada for the 2018 World Junior Championships and scored in his debut. Canada went on to win the gold medal in a 3–1 victory of Sweden.

== Career statistics ==
=== Regular season and playoffs ===
			Regular season					Playoffs
Season	Team	League	GP	G	A	Pts	PIM	GP	G	A	Pts	PIM
2014–15	Soo Thunderbirds	NOJHL	29	18	27	45	18	—	—	—	—	—
2014–15	Sault Ste. Marie Greyhounds	OHL	12	0	2	2	17	—	—	—	—	—
2015–16	Sault Ste. Marie Greyhounds	OHL	63	24	27	51	61	12	6	4	10	4
2016–17	Sault Ste. Marie Greyhounds	OHL	66	35	29	64	46	11	8	5	13	12
2017–18	Sault Ste. Marie Greyhounds	OHL	58	42	43	85	30	24	19	18	37	8
2018–19	Syracuse Crunch	AHL	75	11	12	23	58	4	0	0	0	6
2019–20	Syracuse Crunch	AHL	60	14	18	32	33	—	—	—	—	—
2020–21	Syracuse Crunch	AHL	29	11	23	34	18	—	—	—	—	—
2021–22	Tampa Bay Lightning	NHL	38	2	4	6	25	—	—	—	—	—
2021–22	Syracuse Crunch	AHL	3	0	1	1	0	—	—	—	—	—
2021–22	Chicago Blackhawks	NHL	21	1	0	1	14	—	—	—	—	—
2022–23	Chicago Blackhawks	NHL	58	5	11	16	27	—	—	—	—	—
2023–24	Chicago Blackhawks	NHL	38	5	4	9	12	—	—	—	—	—
2023–24	Rockford IceHogs	AHL	6	3	2	5	2	—	—	—	—	—
2023–24	Ottawa Senators	NHL	21	2	2	4	0	—	—	—	—	—
2024–25	Wilkes-Barre/Scranton Penguins	AHL	67	21	28	49	46	2	0	1	1	0
2025–26	Syracuse Crunch	AHL	21	4	6	10	4	—	—	—	—	—
2025–26	Tampa Bay Lightning	NHL	3	0	0	0	0	—	—	—	—	—
2025–26	Iowa Wild	AHL	8	1	2	3	4	—	—	—	—	—
2025–26	Lehigh Valley Phantoms	AHL	17	6	6	12	14	—	—	—	—	—
NHL totals			179	15	21	36	78	—	—	—	—	—

=== International ===
Year	Team	Event	Result	GP	G	A	Pts	PIM
2016	Canada	U18	4th	5	1	1	2	8
2018	Canada	WJC	1st place, gold medalist(s)	7	3	3	6	4
Junior totals				12	4	4	8	12

== Awards and honours ==
Award	Year
OHL
CHL Top Prospects Game	2016
Second All-Rookie Team	2016
First All-Star Team	2018
AHL
North Division All-Star Team	2021
