= Uwe-Jens Mey =

German speed skater

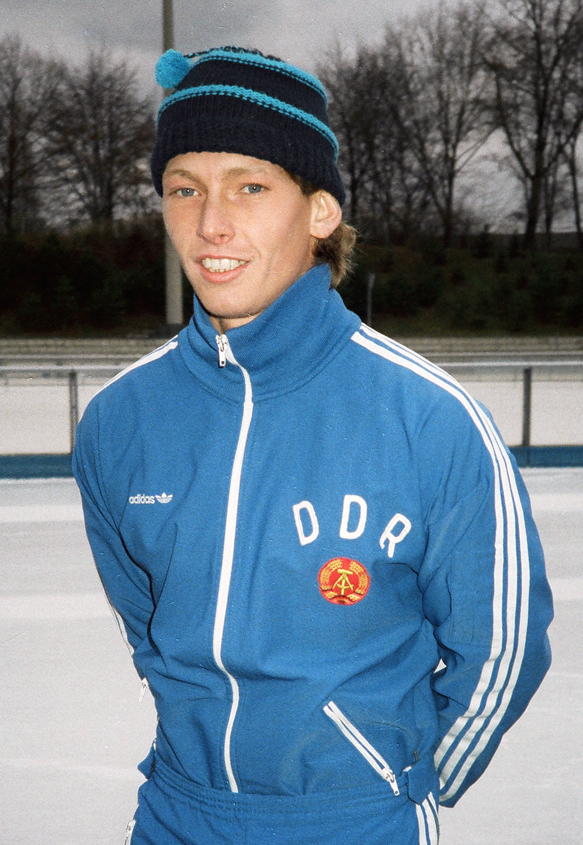
- Mey in 1988

Personal information
- Nationality: German
- Born: 13 December 1963 (age 62) Warsaw, Poland
- Height: 1.80 m (5 ft 11 in)
- Weight: 76 kg (168 lb)

Sport
- Sport: Speed skating
- Club: SC Dynamo Berlin

Achievements and titles
- Personal best(s): 500 m: 36.43 (1992); 1000 m: 1:13.11 (1988); 1500 m: 2:02.27 (1985); 3000 m: 4:35.94 (1982)
Medal record
Men's speed skating
Representing East Germany
Olympic Games
| Gold medal – first place | 1988 Calgary | 500 m |
| Silver medal – second place | 1988 Calgary | 1000 m |
World Sprint Championships
| Silver medal – second place | 1988 West Allis | Sprint |
| Silver medal – second place | 1989 Heerenveen | Sprint |
Representing Germany
Olympic Games
| Gold medal – first place | 1992 Albertville | 500 m |
World Sprint Championships
| Silver medal – second place | 1991 Inzell | Sprint |

Uwe-Jens Mey (born 13 December 1963) is a German former speed skater, considered to be the fastest sprinter of his time because of his 500 metres supremacy in the late 1980s and early 1990s. He was born in Warsaw, Poland.

== Biography ==
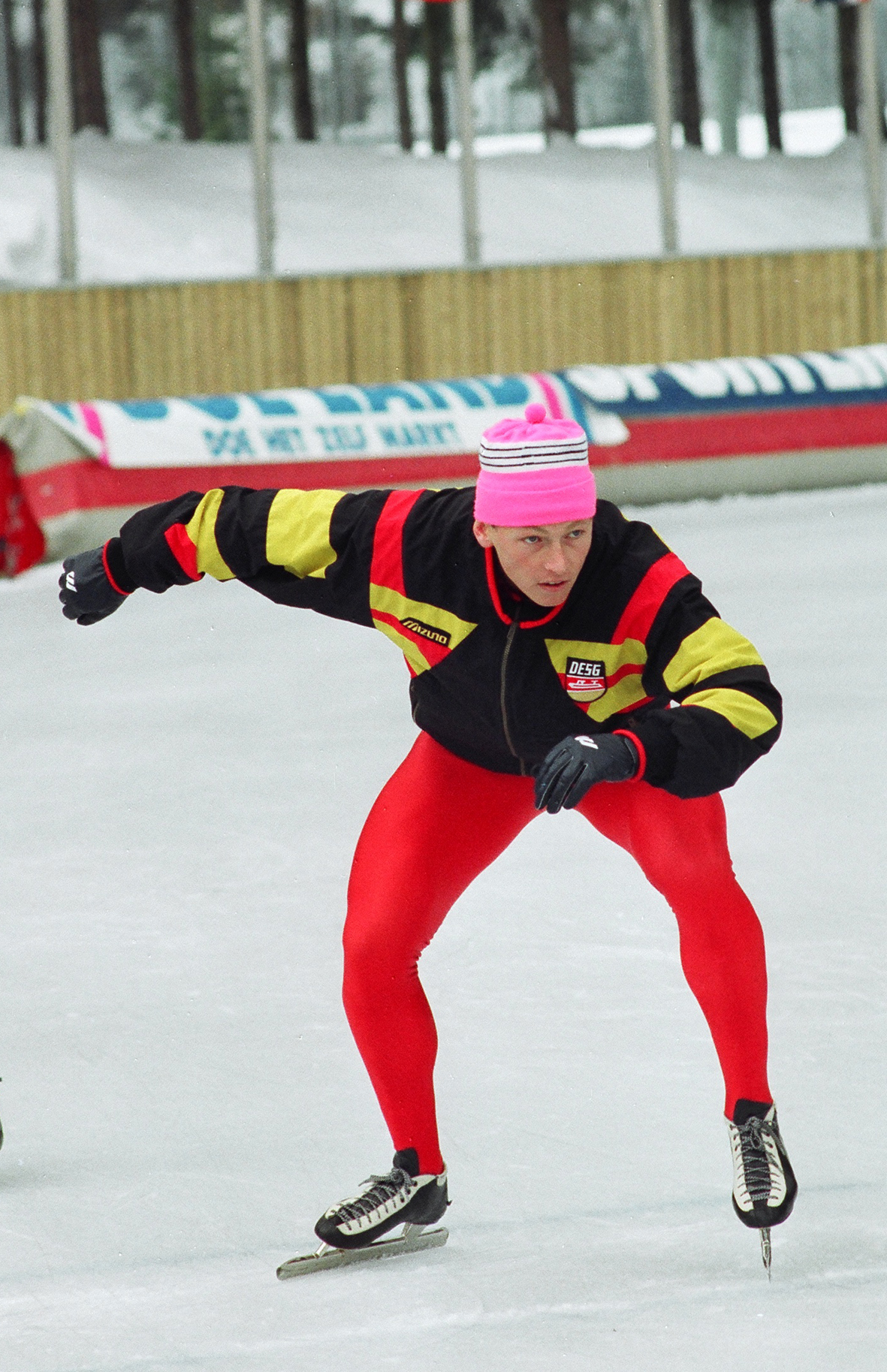
Mey in 1992

Originally competing for East Germany (and after the German reunification for Germany), Mey's first notable achievement was in December 1983. At the age of 19, he outpaced André Hoffmann in the 500 metres and by doing so, Mey earned the East German title and a ticket to the 1984 Winter Olympics in Sarajevo. There, Mey finished 8th on his favourite 500 metres distance.

In the years after the Sarajevo Olympics he stood firm in the international sprinting sub-top, making step-by-step progression. At the World Sprint Championships, he finished 6th, 5th and 4th, respectively, in 1985, 1986 and 1987. Finishing second behind Dan Jansen in the overall standing of the first distances World Cup in 1986, Mey established himself at the 500 metres world top. Mey was a true perfectionist, training very hard to improve his technique. During the mid-1980s, he was considered to be the fastest starter in the world.

One week before the start of the 1988 Winter Olympics in Calgary, he finished second in the World Sprint Championships, behind a supreme Dan Jansen. This made Jansen the favourite for both the 500 and the 1,000 m. But because of a family tragedy (his sister died from leukemia just hours before the start of the 500 m), Jansen turned out to be mentally incapable of sprinting a perfect race; on both distances, Jansen fell. But it still remains doubtful if Jansen would have been able to beat Mey that day; the East German raced perfectly, faster than anyone had ever raced before. His opening time on the first 100 m of the 500 m was 9.76 and he finished in a new world record time of 36.45, a legendary record that would stand firm for four years.

Four days after his legendary 500 m race, Mey started as an outsider for winning the 1,000 m as well. Though not his favourite distance, Mey again skated very fast; his time of 1:13.11 was a new personal record, one he would never beat in his later career. With this time, he outpaced the 1,000 m favourite, Igor Zhelezovski, by 8 hundredths of a second, but Mey wound up finishing in second place, just behind another outsider, the World Allround Champion Nikolay Gulyayev. One month later, Mey won his first 500 metres Overall World Cup. By repeating this achievement during the following the three years, he proved his 500 metres supremacy. He also won the Overall World Cup in his less favoured distance, the 1,000 metres, in 1989 and 1990.

At the World Sprint Championships, he was less successful. In 1989, in Heerenveen, he finished second behind Igor Zhelezovski. In 1990, he did not rank himself because of a fall, and in 1991, he finished second once again behind "Igor the Terrible". In January 1992, in Davos, he broke his own legendary world record, setting it at 36.43, but one week later, it was broken by Dan Jansen. That established Jansen and Mey as the two favourites for the 500 m at the 1992 Winter Olympics. In Albertville, Jansen did not get his revenge for Calgary: Mey outpaced him and all the other sprinters in the field once again, thereby retaining his Olympic gold medal. This turned out to be his last official race.

Mey retired from top speed skating with 2 Olympic gold medals, 1 Olympic silver medal, 4 silver World Championship Sprint medals, 48 World Cup victories, 6 Overall World Cup wins, and 2 world records.

After his skating career Mey became a salesman.

== Records ==
=== World records ===
Over the course of his career, Mey skated 2 world records:

| Event | Time | Date | Venue |
|---|---|---|---|
| 500 m | 0.36,45 | 14 February 1988 | Calgary |
| 500 m | 0.36,43 | 19 January 1992 | Davos |

Source: SpeedSkatingStats.com

=== Personal records ===
| Distance | Result | Date | Location |
|---|---|---|---|
| 500 m | 36.43 | 19 January 1992 | Davos |
| 1,000 m | 1:13.11 | 18 February 1988 | Calgary |
| 1,500 m | 2:02.27 | 6 January 1985 | Innsbruck |
| 3,000 m | 4:35.94 | 27 February 1982 | Innsbruck |
| Sprint combination | 146.770 | 26 February 1989 | Heerenveen |
