= Urs Fehlmann =

Swiss bobsledder (born 1961)

Medal record

Bobsleigh

World Championships
| Gold medal – first place | 1987 St. Moritz | Four-man |

Urs Fehlmann (born 25 August 1961) is a Swiss bobsledder who competed during the 1980s. He won a gold medal in the four-man event at the 1987 FIBT World Championships in St. Moritz. He also competed in the four-man event at the 1988 Winter Olympics.
