= Erwin Fassbind =

Swiss bobsledder (born 1957)

Medal record

Bobsleigh

World Championships
Gold medal – first place	1986 Königssee	Four-man
Gold medal – first place	1987 St. Moritz	Four-man

Erwin Fassbind (born 20 July 1957) is a Swiss bobsledder who competed in the late 1980s. He won two gold medals in the four-man event at the FIBT World Championships, earning them in 1986 and 1987. He also competed in the four man event at the 1988 Winter Olympics.
