= Kurt Teigl =

Austrian bobsledder

Personal information
- Nationality: Austrian
- Born: 8 August 1961 (age 63); Neunkirchen, Austria

Sport
- Sport: Bobsleigh

Kurt Teigl (born 8 August 1961) is an Austrian bobsledder. He competed in the four man event at the 1988 Winter Olympics.
