= Clare Booth =

British alpine skier (born 1964)

Clare Booth (born 19 September 1964 at Liverpool) is a British former alpine skier who competed in the 1984 Winter Olympics and in the 1988 Winter Olympics.

== See also ==
- Winter Olympics
