= Theresa Bielowski =

Austrian politician (born 1984)

Theresa Bielowski MEP
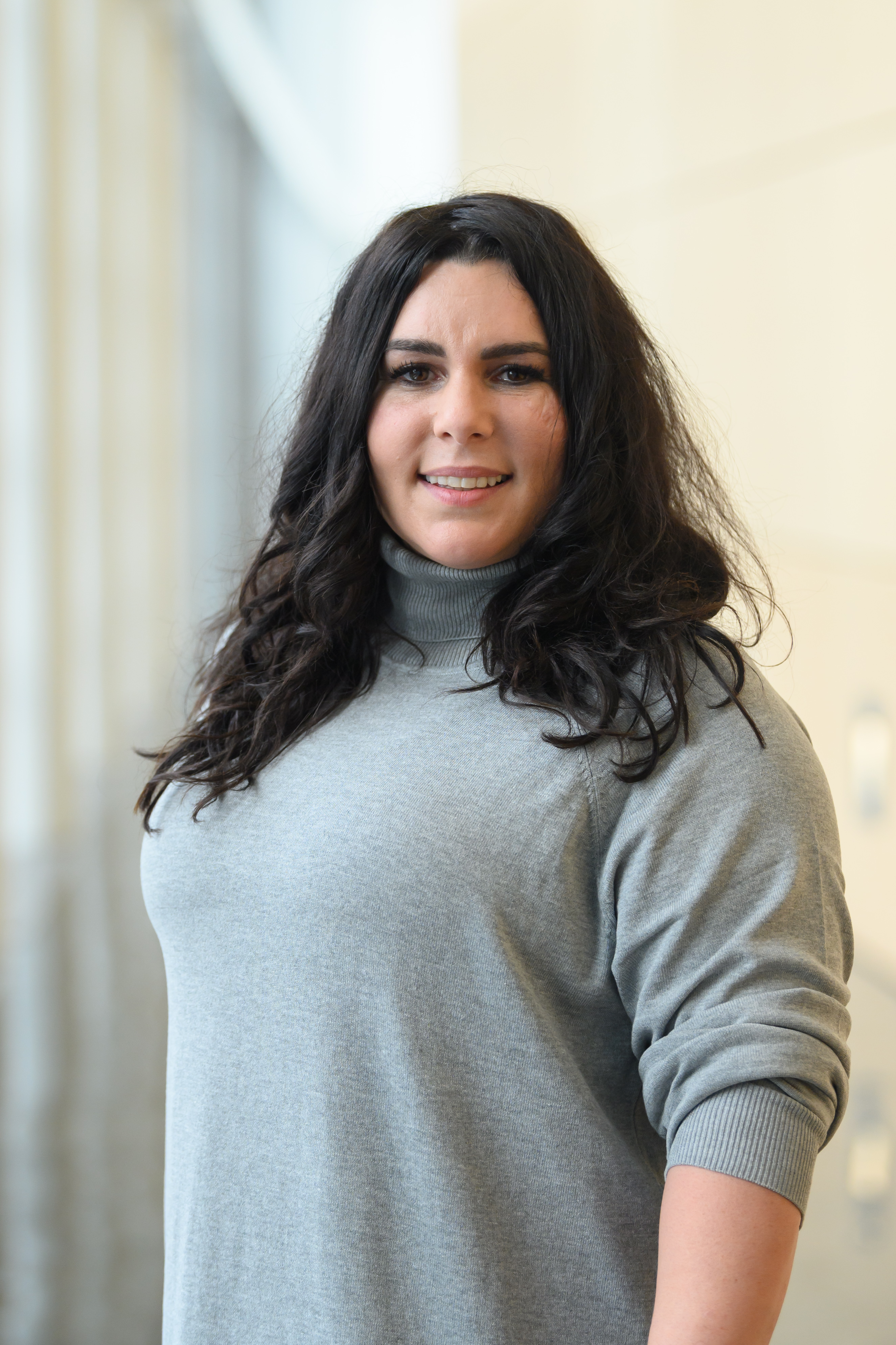

Member of the European Parliament for Austria
- Incumbent
- Assumed office 10 October 2022
- Preceded by: Bettina Vollath

Personal details
- Born: Theresa Muigg; 15 June 1984 (age 41) Schwaz, Tyrol, Austria
- Party: Social Democratic Party of Austria

Theresa Bielowski (Née Muigg; born 15 June 1984) is an Austrian politician of the Social Democratic Party (SPÖ) who has been serving as a Member of the European Parliament since 2022.

== See also ==
- List of members of the European Parliament for Austria, 2019–2024
