= Marty Pierce =

American speed skater

Personal information
- Nationality: American
- Born: April 16, 1966 (age 60) West Allis, Wisconsin, United States

Sport
- Sport: Speed skating

Marty Pierce (born April 16, 1966) is an American speed skater. He competed at the 1988 Winter Olympics and the 1992 Winter Olympics.
