= Olafs Kļaviņš =

Latvian bobsledder

Personal information
- Nationality: Latvian
- Born: 7 February 1964 (age 61); Saldus, Latvian SSR, Soviet Union

Sport
- Sport: Bobsleigh

Olafs Kļaviņš (born 7 February 1964) is a Latvian former bobsledder. He competed in the four man event at the 1988 Winter Olympics, representing the Soviet Union.
