= Josef Muigg =

Austrian bobsledder

Personal information
- Nationality: Austrian
- Born: 27 July 1960 (age 65) Matrei in Osttirol, Austria

Sport
- Sport: Bobsleigh

Josef Muigg (born 27 July 1960) is an Austrian bobsledder. He competed in the four man event at the 1988 Winter Olympics.
