= Martin Harland =

Australian bobsledder (born 1963)

Personal information
- Nationality: Australian
- Born: 10 October 1963 (age 62) Wollongong, Australia

Sport
- Sport: Bobsleigh

Martin Harland (born 10 October 1963) is an Australian bobsledder. He competed in the two man and the four man events at the 1988 Winter Olympics.
