= Dietmar Schauerhammer =

East German bobsledder (born 1955)

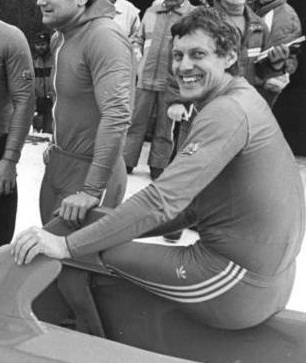
- Dietmar Schauerhammer in 1987.
Medal record
Men's Bobsleigh
Representing East Germany
Olympic Games
Gold medal – first place	1984 Sarajevo	Two-man
Gold medal – first place	1984 Sarajevo	Four-man
Silver medal – second place	1988 Calgary	Four-man
World Championships
Gold medal – first place	1985 Cervinia	Two-man
Gold medal – first place	1986 Königssee	Two-man
Silver medal – second place	1987 St. Moritz	Four-man
Bronze medal – third place	1983 Lake Placid	Two-man
Bronze medal – third place	1987 St. Moritz	Two-man

Dietmar Schauerhammer (born 12 August 1955 in Neustadt an der Orla, Bezirk Gera) is an East German two-time Winter Olympic champion, pentathlete, decathlete and bob pusher for six-time World champion, two-time Olympic champion, four-time European champion, two-time German champion and five-time GDR champion Wolfgang Hoppe who competed during the 1980s. Competing in two Winter Olympics, he won three medals with two golds (two-man: 1984, Four-man: 1984) and one silver (four-man: 1988).

Schauerhammer also won five medals at the FIBT World Championships with two golds (two-man: 1985, 1986), one silver (four-man: 1987), and two bronzes (two-man: 1983, 1987). In October 1986, he was awarded a Star of People's Friendship in gold (second class) for his sporting success.
