= Konstantin Chistyakov =

Russian alpine skier (born 1970)

Konstantin Chistyakov (born 19 March 1970) is a Russian former alpine skier who competed in the 1988 Winter Olympics and 1992 Winter Olympics.
