= Yury Klyuyev =

Soviet speed skater

Personal information
- Native name: Юрий Павлович Клюев
- Full name: Yury Pavlovich Klyuyev
- Nationality: Soviet
- Born: 7 October 1960 (age 64); Moscow, Russian SFSR, Soviet Union

Sport
- Sport: Speed skating

Yury Pavlovich Klyuyev (Russian: Юрий Павлович Клюев; born 7 October 1960) is a Soviet speed skater. He competed in two events at the 1988 Winter Olympics.
