= Alec Leonce =

British bobsledder

Personal information
- Nationality: British
- Born: 19 April 1962 (age 63); London, England

Sport
- Sport: Bobsleigh
- Club: Hillingdon AC

Alec Leonce (born 19 April 1962) is a British bobsledder. He competed in the two man and the four man events at the 1988 Winter Olympics.
