= Simon Dodd (bobsledder) =

Australian bobsledder

Personal information
- Nationality: Australian
- Born: 21 May 1968 (age 57)

Sport
- Sport: Bobsleigh

Simon Dodd (born 21 May 1968) is an Australian bobsledder. He competed in the two man and the four man events at the 1988 Winter Olympics.
