= Yelena Tumanova =

Soviet speed skater

Personal information
- Nationality: Soviet
- Born: 31 May 1965 (age 59)

Sport
- Sport: Speed skating

Yelena Tumanova (born 31 May 1965) is a Soviet speed skater. She competed in three events at the 1988 Winter Olympics. Her son, Boris Katchouk, is a professional ice hockey player.
