= Stephen L. Craig =

American chemist and professor

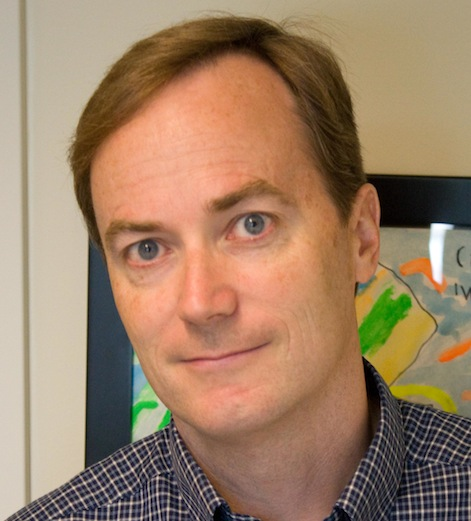
- Education: Duke University (B.S.); University of Cambridge (M.Phil.); Stanford University (Ph.D)
- Known for: Mechanochemistry; Polymer Chemistry; Physical Organic Chemistry
- Scientific career
- Fields: Chemistry
- Workplaces: Duke University
- Doctoral advisor: John Brauman
- Website: craiglab.chem.duke.edu

Stephen L. Craig is the William T. Miller Professor of Chemistry at Duke University. He is the director of the Center for Molecularly Optimized Networks, a NSF Center for Chemical Innovation.

== Career ==
Craig received his B.S. in chemistry from Duke University in 1991. The following year, he completed the M.Phil. in theoretical chemistry at University of Cambridge as a Churchill Scholar. He then began his studies in physical organic chemistry at Stanford University, where he earned his Ph.D. in 1997 working with John Brauman. Upon completion of his Ph.D., he spent two years as a research chemist at DuPont, and one year as a postdoctoral researcher with Julius Rebek at The Scripps Research Institute. He was appointed assistant professor of chemistry at Duke University in 2000, where he was later promoted to associate professor in 2007, and professor in 2012. The following year he was named the William T. Miller Professor of Chemistry, the position he currently holds. He was the chair of the chemistry department from 2012 to 2017.

At Duke, his studies have focused on the mechanisms and reaction dynamics of chemical reactions coupled to mechanical forces (“covalent polymer mechanochemistry”), including single-molecule studies of associative exchange reactions as well as mechanochemical pathways that violate orbital symmetry principles in the absence of force. Chemical concepts that have emerged from these studies include “tension trapping” transition states and reactive intermediates, covalent “stress relief”, and “backbone lever arm effects”. Materials concepts demonstrated by his group include stress-responsive polymers that strengthen in response to destructive mechanical forces and chemomechanically active soft devices like soft robots and electroactive displays. Work in his group in the area of supramolecular polymers led to the development of a “macromolecular analogue of the kinetic isotope effect” that has been used to probe complex non-linear material properties and material toughening through otherwise “mechanically invisible” interactions.

== Current research ==
Ongoing research in the Craig lab bridges physical organic and materials chemistry. Current topics of research include the design and synthesis of self-healing polymers and the use of contemporary mechanochemistry in new stress-responsive polymers, catalysis, and the study of reactive intermediates and transition states. These areas require an interdisciplinary and nontraditional mix of synthetic organic and polymer chemistry, single-molecule spectroscopy, supramolecular chemistry, and materials characterization.

== Major publications ==
(Publications listed below have been cited more than 200 times)

- Q Wang, GR Gossweiler, SL Craig, and X Zhao, "Cephalopod-inspired design of electro-mechano-chemically responsive elastomers for on-demand fluorescent patterning", Nat. Comm., 5, 1-9 (2014)
- GR Gossweiler, GB Hewage, G Soriano, Q Wang, GW Welshofer, X Zhao, and SL Craig, "Mechanochemical activation of covalent bonds in polymers with full and repeatable macroscopic shape recovery", ACS Macro Lett., 3, 216-219 (2014)
- AL Black Ramirez, ZS Kean, JA Orlicki, M Champhekar, SM Elsakr, WE Krause, and SL Craig, "Mechanochemical strengthening of a synthetic polymer in response to typically destructive shear forces", Nat. Chem., 5, 757-761 (2013)
- AL Black, JM Lenhardt, and SL Craig, "From molecular mechanochemistry to stress-responsive materials", J. Mater. Chem., 21, 1655–1663 (2011)
- JM Lenhardt, MT Ong, R Choe, CR Evenhuis, TJ Martinez, and SL Craig, "Trapping a diradical transition state by mechanochemical polymer extension", Science, 329, 1057–1060 (2010)
- JM Lenhardt, AL Black, and SL Craig, "gem-Dichlorocyclopropanes as Abundant and Efficient Mechanophores in Polybutadiene Copolymers under Mechanical Stress", J. Am. Chem. Soc., 131, 10818-10819 (2009)
- H Juwarker, JM Lenhardt, DM Pham, and SL Craig, "1,2,3‐Triazole CH⋅⋅⋅Cl− Contacts Guide Anion Binding and Concomitant Folding in 1,4‐Diaryl Triazole Oligomers", Angew. Chem. Int. Ed., 47, 3740–3743 (2008)
- WC Yount, DM Loveless, and SL Craig, "Strong means slow: Dynamic contributions to the bulk mechanical properties of supramolecular networks", Angew. Chem. Int. Ed., 44, 2746–2748 (2005)
- WC Yount, DM Loveless, and SL Craig, "Small-molecule dynamics and mechanisms underlying the macroscopic mechanical properties of coordinatively cross-linked polymer networks", J. Am. Chem. Soc., 127, 14488–14496 (2005)
- F Hof, SL Craig, C Nuckolls, and J Rebek, "Molecular encapsulation", Angew. Chem. Int. Ed., 41, 1488–1508 (2002)
- ML Chabinyc, SL Craig, CK Regan, and JI Brauman, "Gas-phase ionic reactions: dynamics and mechanism of nucleophilic displacements", Science, 279, 1882–1886 (1998)

== Awards and honors ==
- Fellow, American Association for the Advancement of Science, 2013
- Arther K. Doolittle Award, American Chemical Society, 2013
- Churchill Scholar, 1991–1992
