= Ewan McKenzie =

British cross-country skier (born 1959)

Personal information
- Nationality: British
- Born: 11 January 1959 (age 66); Aviemore, Scotland

Sport
- Sport: Cross-country skiing

Ewan McKenzie (born 11 January 1959) is a British cross-country skier. He competed in the men's 30 kilometre classical event at the 1988 Winter Olympics.
