= Sergey Petrik =

Russian alpine skier (born 1967)

Sergey Petrik (born 1 November 1967) is a Russian former alpine skier who competed in the 1988 Winter Olympics.
