= Franz Siegl =

Austrian bobsledder

Personal information
- Born: 4 August 1955 (age 71)
Medal record
Men's Bobsleigh
Representing Austria
World Championships
| Silver medal – second place | 1986 Königssee | Four-man |

Franz Siegl (born 4 August 1955 in Innsbruck, Tyrol) is an Austrian bobsledder who competed during the 1980s. He won a silver medal in the four-man event at the 1986 FIBT World Championships in Königssee.

Competing in two Winter Olympics, Siegl earned his best finish of sixth in the four-man event at Calgary in 1988.
