= Vitaliy Makovetskiy =

Ukrainian speed skater

Personal information
- Nationality: Ukrainian
- Born: 18 January 1967 (age 58) Kyiv, Ukrainian SSR, Soviet Union

Sport
- Sport: Speed skating

Vitaliy Makovetskiy (born 19 January 1967) is a Ukrainian speed skater. He competed in the men's 500 metres event at the 1988 Winter Olympics.
