= Stephen Brialey =

British luger (born 1963)

Personal information
- Nationality: British
- Born: 8 October 1963 (age 63) London, England

Sport
- Sport: Luge

Stephen Brialey (born 8 October 1963) is a British luger. He competed in the men's singles and doubles events at the 1988 Winter Olympics.
