= George Robertson (bobsleigh) =

British bobsledder

Personal information
- Nationality: British
- Born: 19 December 1958 (age 66); Oxford, England

Sport
- Sport: Bobsleigh

George Robertson (born 19 December 1958) is a British bobsledder. He competed in the four man event at the 1988 Winter Olympics.
