= Tom Cushman =

American speed skater (born 1964)

Personal information
- Full name: Thomas Preston Cushman
- Born: May 28, 1964 (age 62) Saint Paul, Minnesota, United States

Sport
- Sport: Speed skating

Tom Cushman (born May 28, 1964) is an American speed skater. He competed in the men's 1000 metres event at the 1988 Winter Olympics. Cushman later served as a coach of the U.S. national long track speed skating team at the 2002 Winter Olympics, the 2006 Winter Olympics and the 2018 Winter Olympics.

Cushman is a graduate of the University of Minnesota, where he studied international relations and journalism. A longtime resident of Roseville, Minnesota, he retired from coaching in 2019 and moved to Carmel, California to open an art gallery.
