= Peter Kienast =

Austrian bobsledder

Personal information
- Born: 30 March 1949
- Died: 12 December 1991 (aged 42)
Medal record
Men's Bobsleigh
Representing Austria
World Championships
Silver medal – second place	1986 Königssee	Four-man

Peter Kienast (sometimes listed as Pieter Kienast; 30 March 1949 – 12 December 1991) was an Austrian bobsledder who competed during the 1980s. He was born in Ellbögen, Tyrol. He won a silver medal in the four-man event at the 1986 FIBT World Championships in Königssee. Competing in two Winter Olympics, Kienast earned his best finish of sixth in the four-man event at Calgary in 1988. In the 1987-88 Bobsleigh World Cup, he tied for overall champion in the four-man event with fellow Austrian Ingo Appelt.
