= Werner Stocker (bobsledder) =

Swiss bobsledder (born 1961)

Olympic medal record

Bobsleigh
Gold medal – first place	1988 Calgary	Four-man

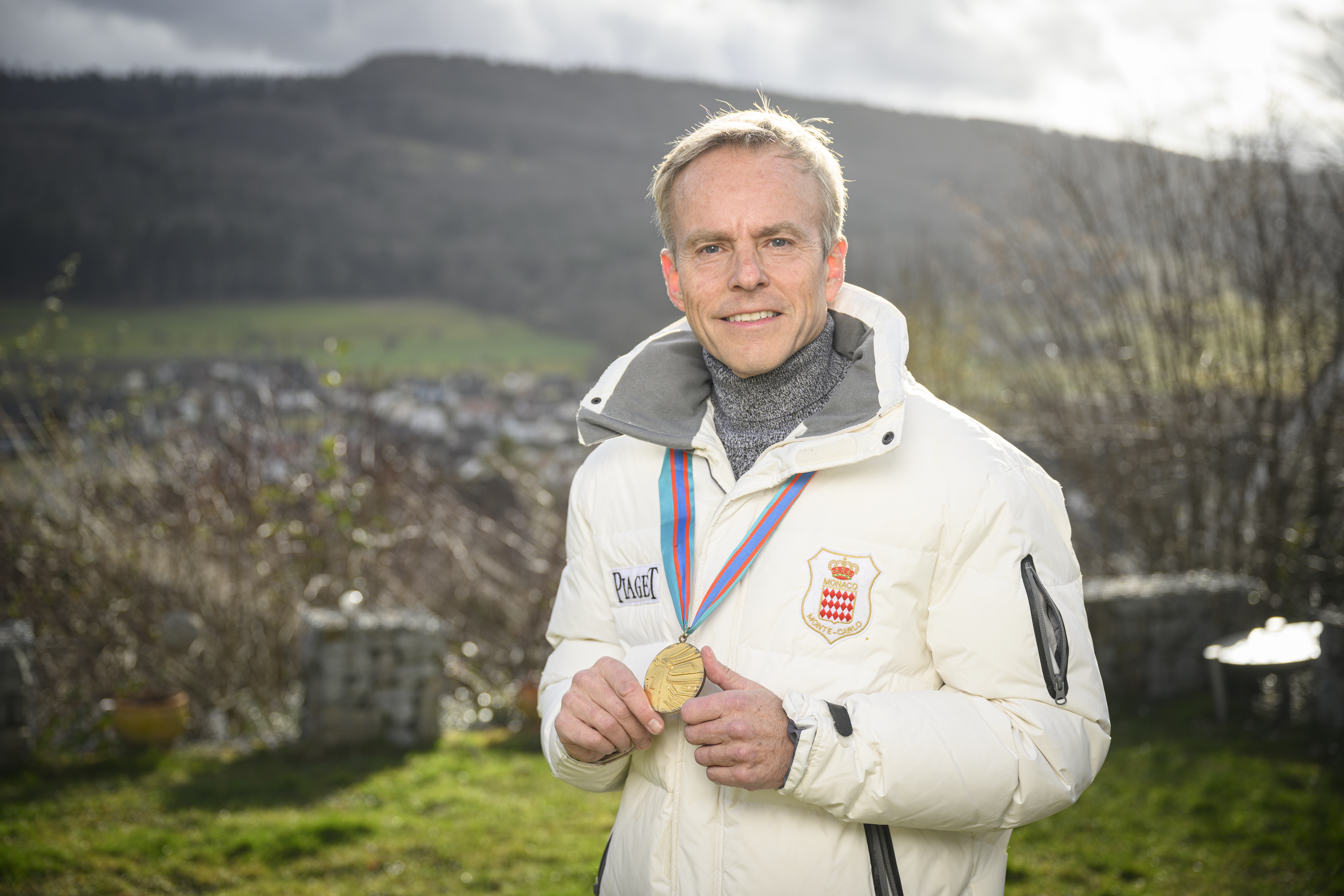
Werner Stocker (2022)

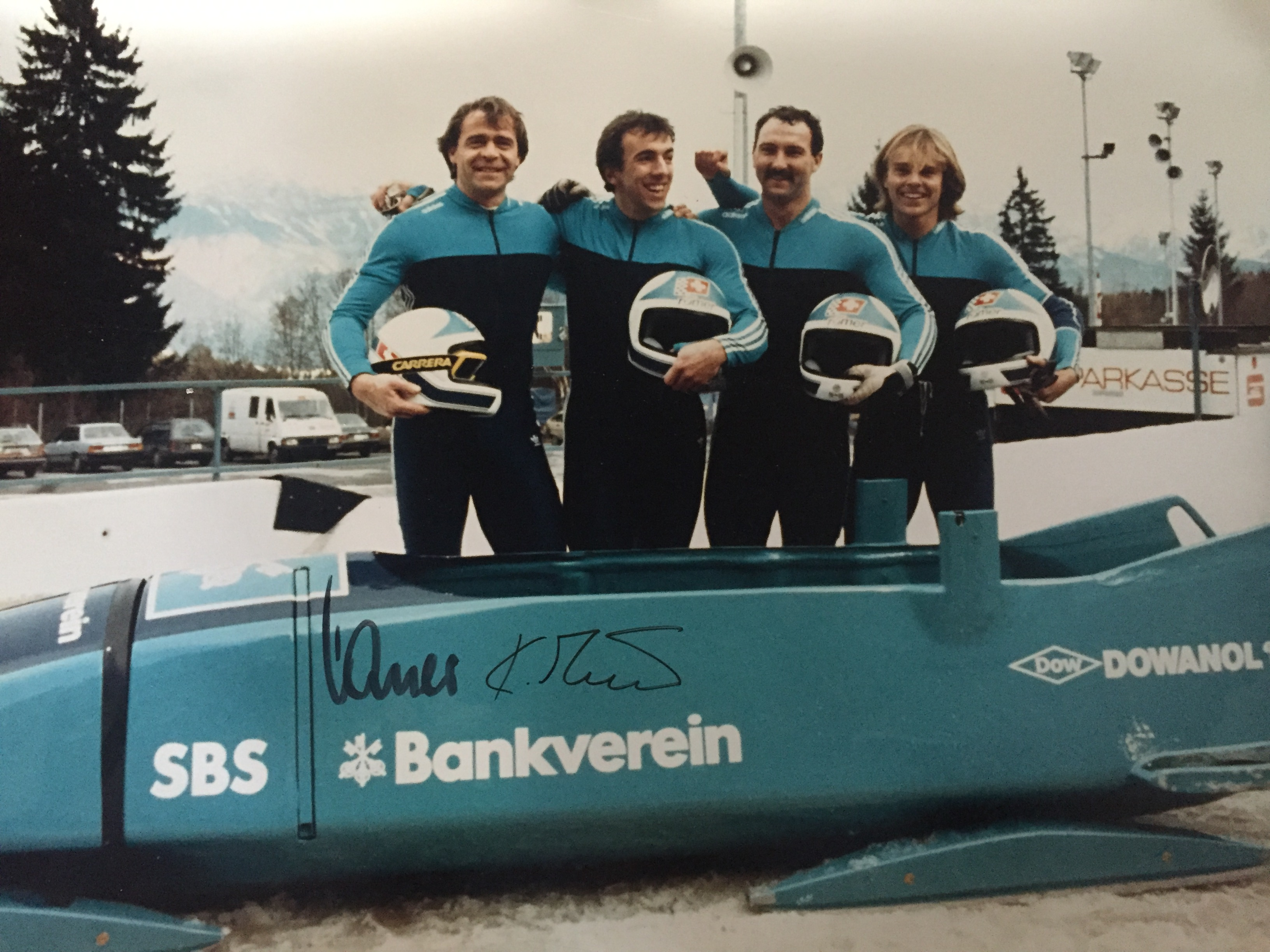
Fasser-Team Bobsleigh 1988

Werner Stocker (born August 14, 1961) is a former Swiss bobsledder and Olympic champion. He has held executive roles in the international IT industry for over 30 years and was a member of the management team at IBM Switzerland from 2013 to 2026. In addition, he is active as a youth coach and as a Keynote-Speaker with focus on leadership, teamwork, and high-performance culture.

== Athletic career ==
Werner Stocker began his athletic career at the age of eleven in track and field with LC Basel 1929 (LCB). He later became a member of the Swiss national athletics team. In the summer of 1985, he was invited by Ekkehard Fasser to join his bobsled team. Although Stocker was pursuing an economics degree and working at the time, he temporarily put both on hold to focus on a career in bobsleigh.

In 1987, Stocker, together with Fasser's team, placed third in the four-man bobsleigh at the Swiss Championships. That same year, the team finished third at the European Bobsleigh Championships in Cervinia, behind the teams of Wolfgang Hoppe (East Germany) and Ralph Pichler (Switzerland).

The highlight of Stocker's sporting career was the 1988 Winter Olympics in Calgary, where he won the gold medal in the four-man bobsleigh together with Ekkehard Fasser, Kurt Meier, and Marcel Fässler. The team set a track record in the third run and was able to defend the lead in the final run. They beat the favored East German team led by Wolfgang Hoppe by seven hundredths of a second.

These Winter Olympics gained additional international recognition through the film Cool Runnings, which tells the story of the first Jamaican bobsleigh team that competed in Calgary in 1988. In the popular portrayal, the Swiss bobsledders appear as a symbol of sporting excellence and discipline. In reality, East Germany was considered the clear favorite at the time, while the Swiss were viewed as underdogs.

Werner Stocker participated in two Olympic Games during his career (1988 and 1992) and became Swiss champion, world champion, and Olympic champion in 1988. After ending his active athletic career, he remained connected to sports and now works as a youth coach at LC Basel 1929, the club where his sporting career began.

== Professional career ==
Werner Stocker holds a Master of Business Administration from the University of Basel and has completed advanced management programs at Harvard University, Boston University, INSEAD, and the Cranfield School of Management. After his Olympic victory in 1988, he completed his studies and transitioned into the business world. Over the following decades, he held senior sales and management positions at international companies such as NCR, AT&T, and especially IBM. He was a member of IBM Switzerland’s executive leadership for many years. Stocker is considered an expert in business and organizational development, with a particular focus on building international sales and support teams.

== Keynote-Speaker ==
In addition to his business career, Werner Stocker is now a sought-after Keynote-Speaker. In his presentations, he combines his experiences from elite sports and business, addressing topics such as leadership, team dynamics, performance management, and corporate culture.

A particular focus of his talks is on building so-called High Performance Teams. Under this and similar titles, he has repeatedly spoken about the success factors of high-performing teams. At various leadership events, he has also discussed risk-taking, innovation culture, and managing setbacks constructively. He illustrates how principles from elite sports can be transferred to business contexts.
