= Juris Jaudzems =

Latvian bobsledder

Personal information
- Nationality: Latvian
- Born: 23 February 1963 (age 62); Jēkabpils, Latvian SSR, Soviet Union
- Height: 183 cm (6 ft 0 in)
- Weight: 90 kg (198 lb)

Sport
- Sport: Bobsleigh

Juris Jaudzems (born 23 February 1963) is a Latvian bobsledder. He competed in the four man event at the 1988 Winter Olympics, representing the Soviet Union.
