= Golnur Postnikova =

Russian alpine skier (born 1964)

Golnur Nagimullovna Postnikova (born 27 July 1964 in Chusovoy) is a Russian former alpine skier who competed in the 1988 Winter Olympics.
