= Ralph Pichler =

Swiss bobsledder (born 1954)

Medal record

Bobsleigh

World Championships
Gold medal – first place	1983 Lake Placid	Two-man
Gold medal – first place	1987 St. Moritz	Two-man
Silver medal – second place	1986 Königssee	Two-man
Bronze medal – third place	1986 Königssee	Four-man
Bronze medal – third place	1987 St. Moritz	Four-man

Ralph Pichler (born 20 April 1954 in Thun, Bern) is a Swiss bobsledder who competed during the 1980s. He won five medals at the FIBT World Championships with two golds (Two-man: 1983, 1987), one silver (Two-man: 1986), and two bronzes (Four-man: 1986, 1987).

Pichler also finished sixth in the two-man event at the 1984 Winter Olympics in Sarajevo, alongside his partner Rico Freiermuth.
