= Heinrich Ott (bobsledder) =

Swiss bobsledder

Medal record

Bobsleigh

World Championships
Bronze medal – third place	1987 St. Moritz	Four-man

Heinrich Ott is a Swiss bobsledder who competed during the late 1980s. He won the bronze medal in the four-man event at the 1987 FIBT World Championships in St. Moritz.
