= Roberto D'Amico (bobsledder) =

Italian bobsledder (born 1961)

Personal information
- Nationality: Italian
- Born: 2 December 1961 (age 63); Cortina d'Ampezzo, Italy

Sport
- Sport: Bobsleigh

Roberto D'Amico (born 2 December 1961) is an Italian bobsledder. He competed in the four man event at the 1988 Winter Olympics.
