= Cal Langford =

Canadian bobsledder (1959–2025)

Cleve "Cal" Langford (March 18, 1959 – August 28, 2025) was a Canadian bobsledder who competed from the late 1980s to the late 1990s. Competing in two Winter Olympics, he earned his best finish of fourth in the four-man event at Albertville in 1992. Langford was born in Winnipeg, Manitoba.
