= Boris Repnin =

Soviet speed skater

Personal information
- Nationality: Soviet
- Born: 30 August 1962 (age 62)

Sport
- Sport: Speed skating

Boris Repnin (born 30 August 1962) is a Soviet speed skater. He competed in the men's 1000 metres event at the 1988 Winter Olympics.
