= Bettina Vollath =

Austrian politician (born 1962)

Bettina Vollath MEP
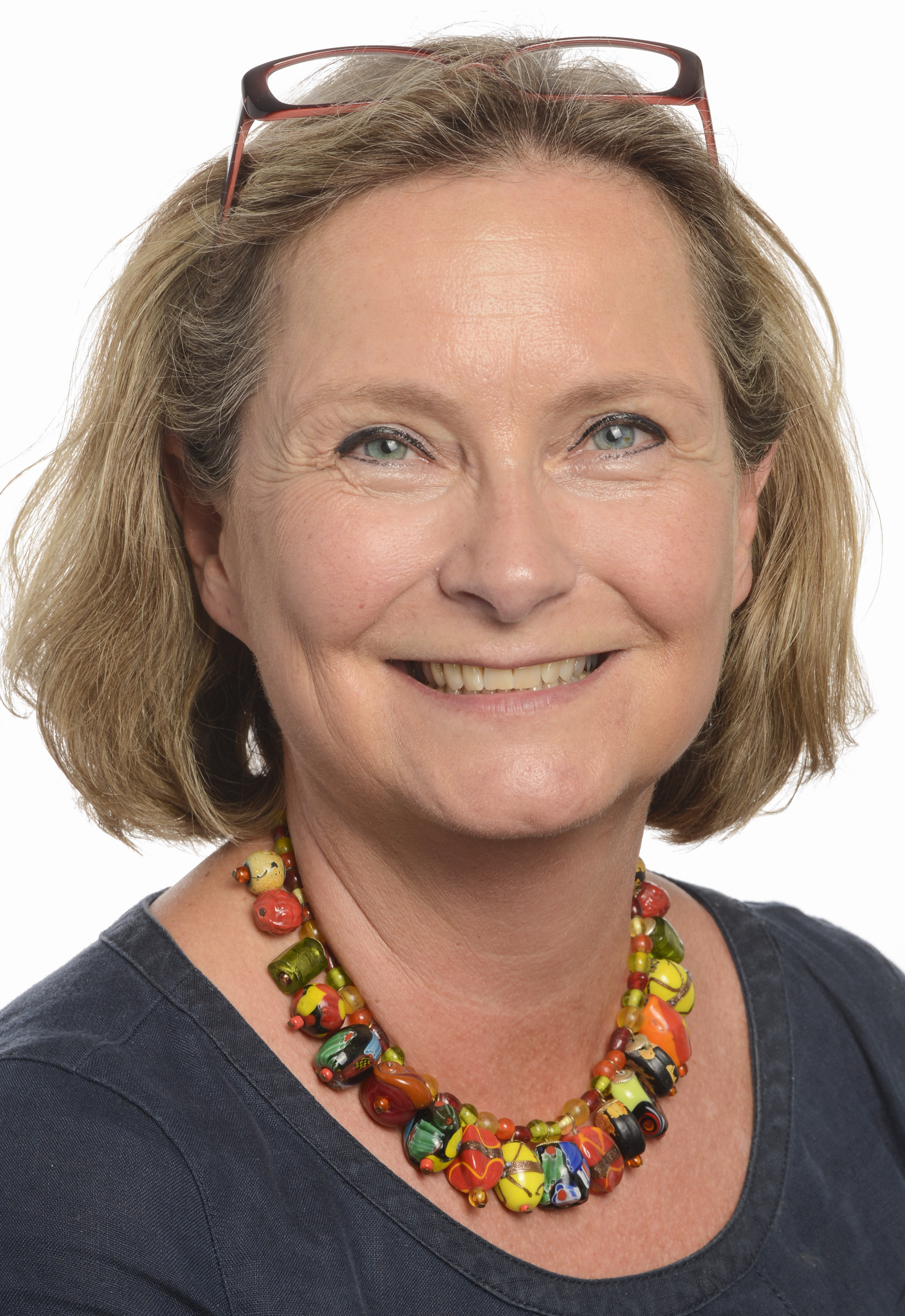

Member of the European Parliament for Austria
- In office 2 July 2019 – 9 October 2022
- Succeeded by: Theresa Muigg

Personal details
- Born: 29 October 1962 (age 63) Graz
- Party: Social Democratic Party of Austria
- Education: University of Graz

Bettina Vollath (born 29 October 1962) is an Austrian politician of the Social Democratic Party (SPÖ) who served as a Member of the European Parliament from 2019 until 2022.

== Political career ==
In parliament, Vollath served on the Committee on Civil Liberties, Justice and Home Affairs. In 2021, she also joined the parliament's working group on Frontex, led by Roberta Metsola.

In addition to her committee assignments, Vollath was part of the parliament's delegation to the EU-Albania Stabilisation and Association Parliamentary Committee.
