= Ekkehard Fasser =

Swiss bobsledder (1952–2021)

Medal record

Bobsleigh

Representing Switzerland

Olympic Games
Gold medal – first place	1988 Calgary	Four-man

World Championships
Gold medal – first place	1983 Lake Placid	Four-man

Ekkehard Fasser (3 September 1952 – 8 April 2021) was a Swiss bobsledder who competed in the 1980s. He won a gold medal in the four-man event with teammates Kurt Meier, Marcel Fässler, and Werner Stocker at the 1988 Winter Olympics in Calgary.

Fasser also earned a gold medal in the four-man event at the 1983 FIBT World Championships in Lake Placid, New York.

He was Bobsleigh World Cup champion overall in 1985-6 and unofficially in four-man that same year. Fasser died on 8 April 2021.
