= Morgan Jones (alpine skier) =

British alpine skier (born 1968)

Morgan Jones (born 29 January 1968 in Sydney) is a British former alpine skier who competed in the 1988 Winter Olympics.
