= Juris Tone =

Latvian-Soviet bobsledder

Medal record

Bobsleigh

Representing the Soviet Union

Olympic Games
Bronze medal – third place	1988 Calgary	Four-man

Juris Tone (born 26 May 1961 in Riga) is a Latvian-Soviet bobsledder who competed in the late 1980s. He won the bronze medal in the four-man event at the 1988 Winter Olympics in Calgary.

He is also the current recordman holder for Latvia in 4 × 100 m in Athletics (Moscow, 39.32, 1983, Spartakiads with Genadijs Murašovs, Ronalds Razmuss, Āris Āboliņš).
