= Audley Richards =

British bobsledder

Personal information
- Nationality: British
- Born: 24 February 1960; Bristol, England
- Died: 10 April 2003 (aged 43)

Sport
- Sport: Bobsleigh

Audley Richards (24 February 1960 – 10 April 2003) was a British bobsledder. He competed in the four man event at the 1988 Winter Olympics.
