= Heinrich Ott (physicist) =

German physicist (1894–1962)

Heinrich Ott (23 March 1894 – 27 November 1962) was a German physicist.

== Education ==
Ott studied under Arnold Sommerfeld at the Ludwig-Maximilians-Universität München. His thesis was on the theory of crystal structure, and he was awarded his doctorate in 1924. He stayed on as Sommerfeld’s assistant. Subsequently, he completed his Habilitation and was a Privatdozent until 1929.

== Selected literature ==
- Heinrich Ott Das Gitter des Aluminiumnitrids (AlN), Zeitschrift für Physik 22 (1) 201-214 (1924). The author is cited as being at the Institute for Theoretical Physics of the Ludwig-Maximilians-Universität München. The article was received on 5 January 1924 and published in December. As cited in Springer Link.
