= Roland Beerli =

Swiss bobsledder

Medal record

Bobsleigh

World Championships
Bronze medal – third place	1986 Königssee	Four-man

Roland Beerli is a Swiss bobsledder who competed during the 1980s. He won a bronze medal in the four-man event at the 1986 FIBT World Championships in Königssee.
