= Robbie Hourmont =

British alpine skier (born 1969)

Personal information
- Born: 21 April 1969 (age 57) Bristol, UK
- Height: 175 cm (5 ft 9 in)
- Weight: 76 kg (168 lb)
- Website: robhourmont.com

Sport
- Sport: Alpine skiing
- Club: Kandahar Ski Club, London

Robert Laurence Hourmont (born 21 April 1969) is a British former alpine skier who competed in the 1988 Winter Olympics in Calgary, Canada. In 1976 his family moved to Innsbruck, Austria, where he gained skiing experience. In 1985, he became the youngest ever British Senior Slalom Champion, and later in 1990 was ranked amongst the world’s top 30.

In November 1990, during a high-speed training session in Austria with the Norway national alpine ski team, his career as a professional alpine skier ended suddenly due to a training accident, causing severe knee damage. Despite his injury, he continued his work. In 2016, Rob’s right knee finally gave in and had to be replaced with a full-titanium prosthesis. At this time, Rob discovered the ketogenic diet to which he adjusted his path immediately and soon after travelled to Bali, Indonesia to pursue his new lifestyle.

== World cup results ==
Date	Location	Race
2 March 1985	(Slovakia) Jasná	Giant slalom
25 February 1988	(Canada) Calgary	Giant slalom
27 February 1988	(Canada) Calgary	Super G
