= Ingo Voge =

East German bobsledder (born 1958)

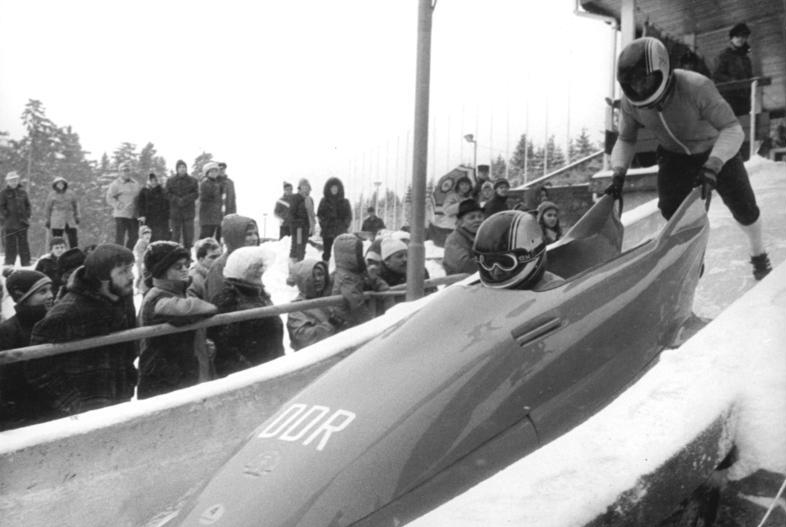
- Voge (pushing sled) in 1983

Medal record

Men's bobsleigh

Representing East Germany

Olympic Games
Silver medal – second place	1984 Sarajevo	Four-man
Silver medal – second place	1988 Calgary	Four-man

World Championships
Gold medal – first place	1985 Cervinia	Four-man
Bronze medal – third place	1989 Cortina d'Ampezzo	Four-man

Ingo Voge (born 14 February 1958 in Falkensee, GDR) is an East German bobsledder who competed during the 1980s. Competing in two Winter Olympics, he won two silver medals in the four-man event (1984, 1988).

Voge also won two medals in the four-man event at the FIBT World Championships with a gold in 1985 and a bronze in 1989.
