= Stephen Craig (bobsleigh) =

Australian bobsledder

Personal information
- Nationality: Australian
- Born: 13 March 1967 (age 58)

Sport
- Sport: Bobsleigh

Stephen Craig (born 13 March 1967) is an Australian bobsledder. He competed in the four man event at the 1988 Winter Olympics.
