= John Spotswood =

British cross-country skier (born 1960)

Personal information
- Nationality: British
- Born: 28 August 1960 (age 65) Carlisle, England

Sport
- Sport: Cross-country skiing

John Spotswood (born 28 August 1960) is a British cross-country skier. He competed at the 1984 Winter Olympics and the 1988 Winter Olympics.
