= Vladimir Kozlov (bobsleigh) =

Soviet Ukrainian bobsledder

Medal record

Men's bobsleigh

Representing the Soviet Union

Olympic Games
Gold medal – first place	1988 Calgary	Two-man
Bronze medal – third place	1988 Calgary	Four-man

Vladimir Yevgenyevich Kozlov (Russian: Владимир Евгеньевич Козлов, born 7 March 1958) is a Soviet Ukrainian bobsledder who competed in the late 1980s. At the 1988 Winter Olympics in Calgary, he won two medals with a gold in the two-man event and a bronze in the four-man event.
