= Patrick Winterton =

British cross-country skier (born 1961)

Personal information
- Nationality: British
- Born: 15 September 1961 (age 64); Aldershot, England

Sport
- Sport: Cross-country skiing

Patrick Winterton (born 15 September 1961) is a British cross-country skier. He competed in the men's 15 kilometre classical event at the 1988 Winter Olympics.

Since 2019, Winterton has been lead commentator on the BBC Scotland sports series The Adventure Show. He also is a commentator on Eurosport covering Cross Country skiing & Biathlon. At the Sochi 2014 Winter Olympics, Winterton commentated on biathlon, cross country, Nordic combined and ski jumping events for the BBC alongside Rob Walker. At the Rio 2016, Tokyo 2020 and Paris 2024 Olympics, Winterton has commentated with Helen Reeves on the canoeing events.
