= Marty Watkins =

British cross-country skier (born 1962)

Personal information
- Nationality: British
- Born: 24 January 1962 (age 63); Stroud, England

Sport
- Sport: Cross-country skiing

Marty Watkins (born 24 January 1962) is a British cross-country skier. He competed at the 1984 Winter Olympics and the 1988 Winter Olympics.
