= Adrian Di Piazza =

Australian bobsledder (born 1962)

Personal information
- Nationality: Australian
- Born: 2 June 1962 (age 63)

Sport
- Sport: Bobsleigh

Adrian Di Piazza (born 2 June 1962) is an Australian bobsleigher. He competed in the two man and the four man events at the 1988 Winter Olympics.
