= Bjørn Hagen =

Norwegian speed skater

Bjørn Hagen (born 4 April 1960) is a Norwegian speed skater, born in Oslo. He competed at the 1988 Winter Olympics in Calgary.

He was Norwegian sprint champion in 1988.
