= Craig McNicoll =

British speed skater

Personal information
- Full name: Craig Albert McNicoll
- Nationality: British
- Born: 11 April 1971 (age 53); Paisley, Scotland

Sport
- Sport: Speed skating

Craig Albert McNicoll (born 11 April 1971) is a British speed skater. He competed at the 1988 Winter Olympics and the 1992 Winter Olympics.
