= Tom De La Hunty =

British bobsledder and coach

Thomas De La Hunty (born 4 July 1956) is a British former bobsledder and bobsleigh coach.

De La Hunty started bobsledding after joining the Royal Air Force in 1978. He started his bobsledding career in 1980, going on to be RAF Champion for 13 years and competing for the British national team from 1980 to 1991. He also competed in the 1984 and 1988 Winter Olympics, earning his best finish of 12th in the two-man event at Calgary in 1988.

After retiring from competition in 1991, he became a coach, initially for the British bobsleigh team, serving as Assistant Ice Coach in the 1992, 1994 and 1998 Winter Olympics and as Head Coach at the 2006 Games in Turin. De La Hunty was also coach of the Dutch team at the 2002 Winter Olympics in Salt Lake City and the 2010 Winter Olympics in Vancouver. In June 2010, De La Hunty was named as coach of the Canadian bobsleigh team, a position which he held until 2016. During that time he guided Kaillie Humphries to her second Olympic gold at the 2014 Games in Sochi, two consecutive World Championships in 2012 and 2013 and three overall Bobsleigh World Cup titles in 2012-13, 2013-14 and 2015-16. In July 2017 he was announced as the head coach of the Dutch Bobsleigh Federation. After his Dutch team failed to qualify for the 2018 Winter Olympics De-La-Hunty was appointed as the Ice Coach for the British Team just for the 2018 Olympics in Pyeonchang. He then continued as Dutch coach leading up to the Beijing Olympics in 2022. In 2020 He was also appointed as dual coach to the Belgian Bobsleigh team and unusually was head coach for both teams at the 2022 games in Beijing. He was recently appointed as head coach to the Chinese Taipei ladies team and managed to get them qualified for the recent 2026 Winter games in Milan-Cortina. His 12th Olympics as an athlete/Coach
