= Guntis Osis =

Latvian Soviet bobsledder (born 1962)

Medal record

Men's bobsleigh

Representing the Soviet Union

Olympic Games
Bronze medal – third place	1988 Calgary	Four-man

Guntis Osis (born 30 October 1962 in Talsi) is a Latvian Soviet bobsledder who competed in the late 1980s. He won the bronze medal in the four-man event at the 1988 Winter Olympics in Calgary.
