= David Armstrong (bobsleigh) =

British bobsledder

Personal information
- Nationality: British
- Born: 2 July 1964 (age 62) Portsmouth, England

Sport
- Sport: Bobsleigh

David Armstrong (born 2 July 1964) is a British bobsledder. He competed at the 1988 Winter Olympics and the 1992 Winter Olympics.
