= Jānis Ķipurs =

Latvian-born bobsledder (born 1958)

Medal record

Men's Bobsleigh

Representing the Soviet Union

Olympic Games
Gold medal – first place	1988 Calgary	Two-man
Bronze medal – third place	1988 Calgary	Four-man

World Championships
Bronze medal – third place	1989 Cortina d'Ampezzo	Two-man

World Cup Championships
Gold medal – first place	1987–88	Two-man
Silver medal – second place	1987–88	Combined

Jānis Ķipurs (sometimes shown as Yanis Kipurs or Janis Kipurs, born 3 January 1958 in Kurmene, Kurmene parish) is a Latvian bobsledder who competed for the Soviet Union in the late 1980s. At the 1988 Winter Olympics in Calgary, he won two medals with a gold in the two-man event and a bronze in the four-man event.

Ķipurs also won a bronze medal in the two-man event at the 1989 FIBT World Championships in Cortina d'Ampezzo.

He won the two-man Bobsleigh World Cup championship in 1987–88.

Because of his successes, the ice rink in his hometown of Sigulda (now part of Latvia) was named in his honor.
