= Marcel Fässler (bobsledder) =

Swiss bobsledder (born 1959)

Olympic medal record

Bobsleigh
Gold medal – first place	1988 Calgary	Four-man

Marcel Fässler (born 21 February 1959) is a Swiss bobsledder who competed in the late 1980s. Fässler won a gold medal in the four-man event with teammates Ekkehard Fasser, Kurt Meier and Werner Stocker at the 1988 Winter Olympics in Calgary.
