= Mike Richmond (speed skater) =

Australian speed skater

Michael Richmond (born in Adelaide, South Australia) is a former ice speed skater from Australia, who represented his native country in three consecutive Winter Olympics, starting in 1980 in Lake Placid, United States.

At the 1980 Olympics, Richmond competed in the 500 m, 1,000 m and 1,500 m events. He came 32nd, 32nd and 34th out of 36, 35 and 37 entrants. In 1984, he came 22nd, 34th and 27th out of 42, 40 and 43 entries. In 1988 he continued to improve and finished 23rd, 12th and 14th out of 36, 39 and 36 entries. He was only the second Australian to place in the top half of the field in a speed skating event.

Richmond started as an allround skater but focussed mainly on the short distances later in his career. He has held the Australian national records on the 500, 1,000 and 1,500 meters for over 20 years before Richard Goerlitz broke them in 2004/2005. Richmond started Ice Racing in the Short Track discipline, where he was Australian Champion 10 years running and held 2 World Records in the 500m and 1000m events in 1981.

Mike Richmond is now a physiotherapist. He also owns a gym called Fit Life Health and Fitness centre, which recently won South Australian fitness centre of the year.
