= Alpine skiing at the 1988 Winter Olympics – Men's giant slalom =

Men's giant slalom at the XV Olympic Winter Games
- Alpine skiing
- Venue: Nakiska
- Date: February 25, 1988
- Competitors: 117 from 38 nations
- Winning time: 2:06.37

Medalists
1st place, gold medalist(s)		Alberto Tomba	Italy
2nd place, silver medalist(s)		Hubert Strolz	Austria
3rd place, bronze medalist(s)		Pirmin Zurbriggen	Switzerland

The Men's giant slalom competition of the Calgary 1988 Olympics was held at Nakiska.

The defending world champion was Pirmin Zurbriggen of Switzerland, who was also the defending World Cup giant slalom champion, while Alberto Tomba was leader of the 1988 World Cup.

== Results ==
Rank	Name	Country	Run 1	Run 2	Total	Difference
1st place, gold medalist(s)	Alberto Tomba	Italy	1:03.91	1:02.46	2:06.37	-
2nd place, silver medalist(s)	Hubert Strolz	Austria	1:05.05	1:02.36	2:07.41	+1.04
3rd place, bronze medalist(s)	Pirmin Zurbriggen	Switzerland	1:05.57	1:02.82	2:08.39	+2.02
4	Ivano Camozzi	Italy	1:05.86	1:02.91	2:08.77	+2.40
5	Rudi Nierlich	Austria	1:05.75	1:03.17	2:08.92	+2.55
6	Andreas Wenzel	Liechtenstein	1:05.65	1:03.38	2:09.03	+2.66
7	Helmut Mayer	Austria	1:06.32	1:02.77	2:09.09	+2.72
8	Frank Wörndl	West Germany	1:06.10	1:03.12	2:09.22	+2.85
9	Rok Petrovič	Yugoslavia	1:06.31	1:03.01	2:09.32	+2.95
10	Joël Gaspoz	Switzerland	1:06.70	1:02.87	2:09.57	+3.20
11	Günther Mader	Austria	1:06.74	1:03.30	2:10.04	+3.67
12	Tiger Shaw	United States	1:06.71	1:03.52	2:10.23	+3.86
13	Felix McGrath	United States	1:06.79	1:03.81	2:10.60	+4.23
14	Hans Pieren	Switzerland	1:06.46	1:04.22	2:10.68	+4.31
15	Klemen Bergant	Yugoslavia	1:07.16	1:03.88	2:11.04	+4.67
16	Johan Wallner	Sweden	1:06.84	1:04.46	2:11.30	+4.93
17	Carlo Gerosa	Italy	1:06.90	1:04.75	2:11.65	+5.28
18	Christian Gaidet	France	1:07.59	1:04.08	2:11.67	+5.30
19	Markus Wasmeier	West Germany	1:06.60	1:05.09	2:11.69	+5.32
20	Marc Girardelli	Luxembourg	1:07.79	1:04.00	2:11.79	+5.42
21	Jonas Nilsson	Sweden	1:07.58	1:04.40	2:11.98	+5.61
22	Jörgen Sundqvist	Sweden	1:07.68	1:04.43	2:12.11	+5.74
23	Robert Žan	Yugoslavia	1:07.67	1:04.51	2:12.18	+5.81
24	Yves Tavernier	France	1:07.44	1:04.77	2:12.21	+5.84
25	Günther Marxer	Liechtenstein	1:08.00	1:04.72	2:12.72	+6.35
26	Armin Bittner	West Germany	1:08.56	1:04.71	2:13.27	+6.90
27	Heinz Holzer	Italy	1:08.08	1:05.20	2:13.28	+6.91
28	Tetsuya Okabe	Japan	1:08.30	1:06.19	2:14.49	+8.12
29	Silvio Wille	Liechtenstein	1:09.20	1:05.88	2:15.08	+8.71
30	Sergey Petrik	Soviet Union	1:09.78	1:05.38	2:15.16	+8.79
31	Chiaki Ishioka	Japan	1:09.11	1:06.29	2:15.40	+9.03
32	Richard Biggins	Australia	1:09.33	1:06.15	2:15.48	+9.11
33	Peter Jurko	Czechoslovakia	1:09.21	1:06.29	2:15.50	+9.13
34	Bob Ormsby	United States	1:10.07	1:05.78	2:15.85	+9.48
35	Konstantin Chistyakov	Soviet Union	1:10.09	1:06.58	2:16.67	+10.30
36	Steven Lee	Australia	1:10.64	1:06.90	2:17.54	+11.17
37	Jorge Pujol	Spain	1:11.31	1:08.16	2:19.47	+13.10
38	Elias Majdalani	Lebanon	1:10.95	1:08.63	2:19.58	+13.21
39	Delfin Campo	Spain	1:11.68	1:08.50	2:20.18	+13.81
40	Juan Pablo Santiagos	Chile	1:12.69	1:08.78	2:21.47	+15.10
41	Martin Bell	Great Britain	1:12.64	1:09.72	2:22.36	+15.99
42	Daníel Hilmarsson	Iceland	1:13.15	1:09.59	2:22.74	+16.37
43	Mauricio Rotella	Chile	1:12.40	1:10.73	2:23.13	+16.76
44	Paulo Oppliger	Chile	1:13.16	1:10.60	2:23.76	+17.39
45	Jorge Birkner	Argentina	1:13.36	1:10.87	2:24.23	+17.86
46	Ignacio Birkner	Argentina	1:14.67	1:11.41	2:26.08	+19.71
47	Javier Rivara	Argentina	1:15.69	1:12.96	2:28.65	+22.28
48	Nam Won-Gi	South Korea	1:17.06	1:14.72	2:31.78	+25.41
49	Giannis Stamatiou	Greece	1:17.36	1:15.10	2:32.46	+26.09
50	Ioannis Kapraras	Greece	1:18.23	1:14.64	2:32.87	+26.50
51	Kang Nak-Youn	South Korea	1:17.41	1:15.77	2:33.18	+26.81
52	Hubertus von Fürstenberg-von Hohenlohe	Mexico	1:18.86	1:15.71	2:34.57	+28.20
53	Göksay Demirhan	Turkey	1:18.82	1:16.74	2:35.56	+29.19
54	Sokratis Aristodimou	Cyprus	1:20.54	1:16.53	2:37.07	+30.70
55	Resul Sare	Turkey	1:20.04	1:17.36	2:37.40	+31.03
56	Nicola Ercolani	San Marino	1:21.42	1:17.14	2:38.56	+32.19
57	Alex Christian Benoit	Mexico	1:22.35	1:19.10	2:41.45	+35.08
58	Alekhis Fotiadis	Cyprus	1:23.17	1:20.45	2:43.62	+37.25
59	Ahmet Demir	Turkey	1:23.29	1:20.45	2:43.74	+37.37
60	Fabio Guardigli	San Marino	1:24.40	1:22.15	2:46.55	+40.18
61	Kevin Wilson	Puerto Rico	1:26.31	1:22.88	2:49.19	+42.82
62	Arturo Kinch	Costa Rica	1:26.71	1:23.12	2:49.83	+43.46
63	Francesco Cardelli	San Marino	1:27.15	1:24.28	2:51.43	+45.06
64	Fabrice Notari	Monaco	1:27.14	1:25.01	2:52.15	+45.78
65	Carlos Andrés Bruderer	Guatemala	1:29.45	1:26.17	2:55.62	+49.25
66	Walter Sandza	Puerto Rico	1:35.34	1:33.43	3:08.77	+62.40
67	Félix Flechas	Puerto Rico	1:38.01	1:34.99	3:13.00	+66.63
68	Julián Muñoz	Costa Rica	1:38.71	1:41.88	3:20.59	+74.22
69	Alfredo Rego	Guatemala	1:45.07	1:41.52	3:26.59	+80.22
-	Tomaž Čižman	Yugoslavia	1:06.16	DNF	-	-
-	Martin Hangl	Switzerland	1:07.51	DNS	-	-
-	Ingemar Stenmark	Sweden	1:08.49	DNF	-	-
-	Robert Büchel	Liechtenstein	1:08.55	DNF	-	-
-	Finn Christian Jagge	Norway	1:09.70	DNF	-	-
-	Lyubomir Popov	Bulgaria	1:10.73	DNF	-	-
-	Matthias Hubrich	New Zealand	1:12.25	DNS	-	-
-	Robbie Hourmont	Great Britain	1:13.54	DNF	-	-
-	Gerard Escoda	Andorra	1:13.84	DQ	-	-
-	Riccardo Stacchini	San Marino	1:21.89	DNF	-	-
-	José-Manuel Bejarano	Bolivia	1:39.50	DNS	-	-
-	Patrice Martell	Mexico	?	DNF	-	-
-	Peter Roth	West Germany	DNF	-	-	-
-	Alain Feutrier	France	DNF	-	-	-
-	Simon Wi Rutene	New Zealand	DNF	-	-	-
-	Luis Fernández Ochoa	Spain	DNF	-	-	-
-	Jack Miller	United States	DNF	-	-	-
-	Adrian Bireš	Czechoslovakia	DNF	-	-	-
-	Morgan Jones	Great Britain	DNF	-	-	-
-	Borislav Dimitrachkov	Bulgaria	DNF	-	-	-
-	Graham Bell	Great Britain	DNF	-	-	-
-	Stefan Shalamanov	Bulgaria	DNF	-	-	-
-	Katsuhito Kumagai	Japan	DNF	-	-	-
-	Nils Linneberg	Chile	DNF	-	-	-
-	Park Jae-Hyuk	South Korea	DNF	-	-	-
-	Federico van Ditmar	Argentina	DNF	-	-	-
-	Jason Edelmann	Puerto Rico	DNF	-	-	-
-	Christian Bruderer	Guatemala	DNF	-	-	-
-	Yakup Kadri Birinci	Turkey	DNF	-	-	-
-	Hur Seung-Wook	South Korea	DNF	-	-	-
-	Carlos Pruneda	Mexico	DNF	-	-	-
-	Jim Read	Canada	DQ	-	-	-
-	Alain Villiard	Canada	DQ	-	-	-
-	Peter Bosinger	Canada	DQ	-	-	-
-	Greg Grossmann	Canada	DQ	-	-	-
-	Guillermo Avila	Bolivia	DQ	-	-	-
-	Chen Tong-jong	Chinese Taipei	DQ	-	-	-
-	Karim Sabbagh	Lebanon	DQ	-	-	-
-	Jaime Bascon	Bolivia	DQ	-	-	-
-	Pierre Succar	Lebanon	DQ	-	-	-
-	Lin Chi-liang	Chinese Taipei	DQ	-	-	-
-	Ong Ching-ming	Chinese Taipei	DQ	-	-	-
-	Toni Salame	Lebanon	DQ	-	-	-
-	Kuo Koul-hwa	Chinese Taipei	DQ	-	-	-
-	Enrique Montano	Bolivia	DQ	-	-	-
-	Ahmad Ouachit	Morocco	DQ	-	-	-
-	Lotfi Housnialaoui	Morocco	DQ	-	-	-
-	Ahmed Ait Moulay	Morocco	DQ	-	-	-
