= Alpine skiing at the 1988 Winter Olympics – Men's super-G =

Men's Super G at the XV Olympic Winter Games
- Alpine skiing
- Venue: Nakiska
- Date: February 21, 1988
- Competitors: 94 from 34 nations
- Winning time: 1:39.66

Medalists
| 1st place, gold medalist(s) | | Franck Piccard | France |
| 2nd place, silver medalist(s) | | Helmut Mayer | Austria |
| 3rd place, bronze medalist(s) | | Lars-Börje Eriksson | Sweden |

Men's Super-G
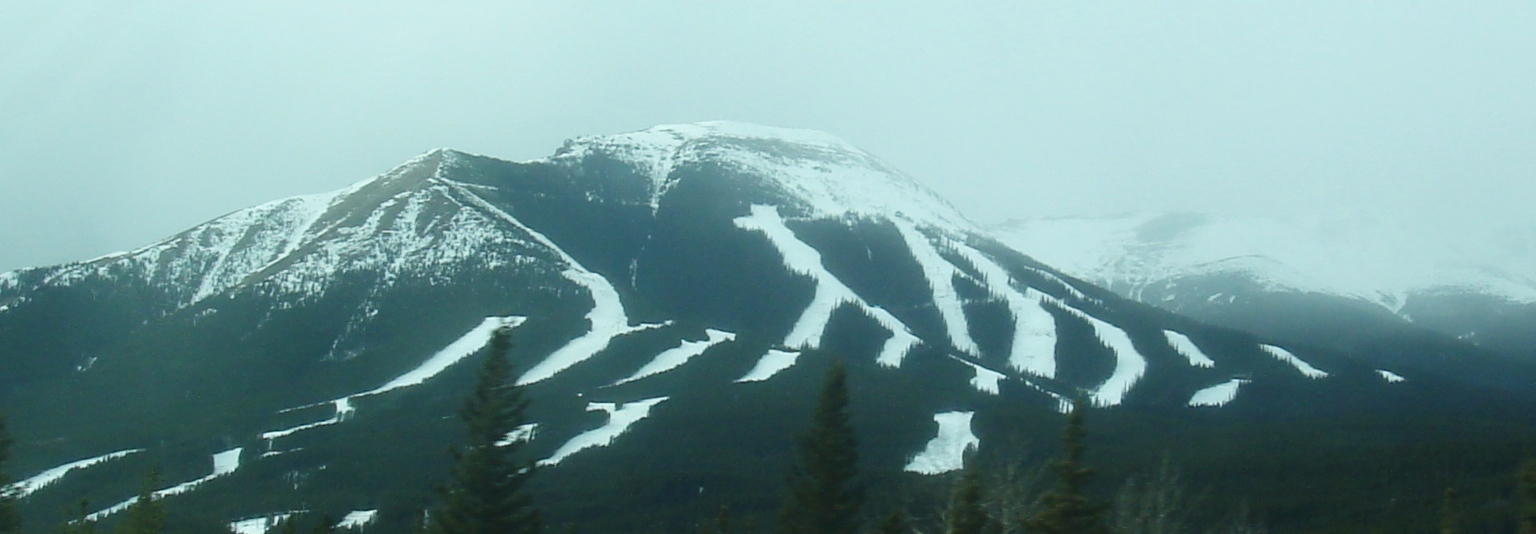
- Location: Nakiska
- Vertical: 647 m (2,123 ft)
- Top elevation: 2,179 m (7,149 ft)
- Base elevation: 1,532 m (5,026 ft)

The Men's Super G competition of the Calgary 1988 Olympics was held at Nakiska on Sunday, February 21. This was the Olympic debut of the event.

The defending world champion was Pirmin Zurbriggen of Switzerland, who was also the defending World Cup Super G champion and led the current season.

France's Franck Piccard won the gold medal, Helmut Mayer of Austria took the silver, and Lars-Börje Eriksson of Sweden was the bronze medalist. Zurbriggen tied for fifth, more than two seconds behind. Italy's Alberto Tomba lasted three gates and did not finish. It was the first Olympic alpine gold for France in twenty years, since the sweep by Jean-Claude Killy in 1968.

The course started at an elevation of 2,179 m (7,149 ft) above sea level with a vertical drop of 647 m (2,123 ft) and a course length of 2.327 km (1.45 mi). Piccard's winning time was 99.66 seconds, yielding an average speed of 84.058 km/h (52.2 mph), with an average vertical descent rate of 6.492 m/s (21.3 ft/s).

== Results ==
The race was started at 10:00 local time, (UTC −7). At the starting gate, it was snowing, the temperature was −3.0 °C (26.6 °F), and the snow condition was hard. The temperature at the finish was 1.0 °C (33.8 °F).

| Rank | Bib | Name | Country | Time | Difference |
|---|---|---|---|---|---|
| 1st place, gold medalist(s) | 5 | Franck Piccard | France | 1:39.66 | — |
| 2nd place, silver medalist(s) | 10 | Helmut Mayer | Austria | 1:40.96 | +1.30 |
| 3rd place, bronze medalist(s) | 1 | Lars-Börje Eriksson | Sweden | 1:41.08 | +1.42 |
| 4 | 17 | Hubert Strolz | Austria | 1:41.11 | +1.45 |
| 5 | 14 | Pirmin Zurbriggen | Switzerland | 1:41.96 | +2.30 |
| 5 | 7 | Günther Mader | Austria | 1:41.96 | +2.30 |
| 7 | 23 | Luc Alphand | France | 1:42.27 | +2.61 |
| 8 | 8 | Leonhard Stock | Austria | 1:42.36 | +2.70 |
| 9 | 25 | Tomaž Čižman | Yugoslavia | 1:42.47 | +2.81 |
| 10 | 20 | Ivano Camozzi | Italy | 1:42.66 | +3.00 |
| 11 | 4 | Heinz Holzer | Italy | 1:42.88 | +3.22 |
| 12 | 13 | Andreas Wenzel | Liechtenstein | 1:43.00 | +3.34 |
| 13 | 37 | Jim Read | Canada | 1:43.01 | +3.35 |
| 14 | 27 | Shinya Chiba | Japan | 1:43.03 | +3.37 |
| 15 | 15 | Franz Heinzer | Switzerland | 1:43.32 | +3.66 |
| 16 | 32 | Klemen Bergant | Yugoslavia | 1:43.41 | +3.75 |
| 17 | 19 | Günther Marxer | Liechtenstein | 1:44.16 | +4.50 |
| 18 | 35 | Tiger Shaw | United States | 1:44.26 | +4.60 |
| 19 | 12 | Felix Belczyk | Canada | 1:44.31 | +4.65 |
| 20 | 36 | Niklas Lindqvist | Sweden | 1:44.88 | +5.22 |
| 20 | 28 | Yves Tavernier | France | 1:44.88 | +5.22 |
| 22 | 40 | Rob Boyd | Canada | 1:45.04 | +5.38 |
| 23 | 31 | Adrian Bireš | Czechoslovakia | 1:45.33 | +5.67 |
| 24 | 52 | Matthias Hubrich | New Zealand | 1:45.46 | +5.80 |
| 24 | 29 | Jeff Olson | United States | 1:45.46 | +5.80 |
| 26 | 33 | Carlo Gerosa | Italy | 1:45.82 | +6.16 |
| 27 | 38 | Peter Jurko | Czechoslovakia | 1:46.03 | +6.37 |
| 28 | 49 | Silvio Wille | Liechtenstein | 1:46.08 | +6.42 |
| 29 | 48 | Nigel Smith | Great Britain | 1:47.15 | +7.49 |
| 30 | 34 | Bill Hudson | United States | 1:47.29 | +7.63 |
| 31 | 60 | Richard Biggins | Australia | 1:47.38 | +7.72 |
| 32 | 84 | Elias Majdalani | Lebanon | 1:47.58 | +7.92 |
| 33 | 61 | Juan Pablo Santiagos | Chile | 1:48.74 | +9.08 |
| 34 | 26 | Martin Bell | Great Britain | 1:48.82 | +9.16 |
| 35 | 53 | Graham Bell | Great Britain | 1:48.98 | +9.32 |
| 36 | 58 | Jorge Pujol | Spain | 1:49.33 | +9.67 |
| 37 | 63 | Paulo Oppliger | Chile | 1:49.71 | +10.05 |
| 38 | 59 | Nahum Orobitg | Andorra | 1:53.22 | +13.56 |
| 39 | 65 | Jorge Birkner | Argentina | 1:53.79 | +14.13 |
| 40 | 67 | Park Jae-hyuk | South Korea | 1:53.89 | +14.23 |
| 41 | 87 | Hur Seung-Wook | South Korea | 1:55.13 | +15.47 |
| 42 | 66 | Hubertus von Hohenlohe | Mexico | 1:56.03 | +16.37 |
| 43 | 94 | Resul Sare | Turkey | 1:57.65 | +17.99 |
| 44 | 90 | Yakup Kadri Birinci | Turkey | 1:59.32 | +19.66 |
| 45 | 72 | Nicola Ercolani | San Marino | 1:59.70 | +20.04 |
| 46 | 77 | Ioannis Kapraras | Greece | 2:02.06 | +22.40 |
| 47 | 93 | Göksay Demirhan | Turkey | 2:02.22 | +22.56 |
| 48 | 68 | Sokratis Aristodimou | Cyprus | 2:03.10 | +23.44 |
| 49 | 83 | Alex Christian Benoit | Mexico | 2:05.80 | +26.14 |
| 50 | 88 | Christian Bruderer | Guatemala | 2:05.99 | +26.33 |
| 51 | 73 | Fabio Guardigli | San Marino | 2:06.59 | +26.93 |
| 52 | 89 | Jason Edelmann | Puerto Rico | 2:09.93 | +30.27 |
| 53 | 91 | Patrice Martell | Mexico | 2:10.69 | +31.03 |
| 54 | 86 | Fabrice Notari | Monaco | 2:11.73 | +32.07 |
| 55 | 99 | Ong Ching-Ming | Chinese Taipei | 2:17.22 | +37.56 |
| 56 | 78 | Walter Sandza | Puerto Rico | 2:25.95 | +46.29 |
| 57 | 82 | Lin Chi-Liang | Chinese Taipei | 2:30.81 | +51.15 |
| - | 98 | Carlos Andrés Bruderer | Guatemala | DNF | - |
| - | 97 | Nam Won-gi | South Korea | DNF | - |
| - | 85 | Daníel Hilmarsson | Iceland | DNF | - |
| - | 80 | Javier Rivara | Argentina | DNF | - |
| - | 79 | Federico van Ditmar | Argentina | DNF | - |
| - | 86 | Félix Flechas | Puerto Rico | DNF | - |
| - | 75 | Kevin Wilson | Puerto Rico | DNF | - |
| - | 70 | Kang Nak-youn | South Korea | DNF | - |
| - | 69 | Alekhis Fotiadis | Cyprus | DNF | - |
| - | 62 | Gerard Escoda | Andorra | DNF | - |
| - | 56 | Delfin Campo | Spain | DNF | - |
| - | 55 | Nils Linneberg | Chile | DNF | - |
| - | 54 | Konstantin Chistyakov | Soviet Union | DNF | - |
| - | 51 | Alain Villiard | Canada | DNF | - |
| - | 50 | Frank Wörndl | West Germany | DNF | - |
| - | 47 | Sergey Petrik | Soviet Union | DNF | - |
| - | 46 | Simon Wi Rutene | New Zealand | DNF | - |
| - | 45 | Finn Christian Jagge | Norway | DNF | - |
| - | 43 | Niklas Henning | Sweden | DNF | - |
| - | 42 | Robert Büchel | Liechtenstein | DNF | - |
| - | 41 | Katsuhito Kumagai | Japan | DNF | - |
| - | 39 | Luis Fernández Ochoa | Spain | DNF | - |
| - | 30 | Philippe Verneret | France | DNF | - |
| - | 24 | Steven Lee | Australia | DNF | - |
| - | 22 | Atle Skårdal | Norway | DNF | - |
| - | 21 | Jan Einar Thorsen | Norway | DNF | - |
| - | 18 | Daniel Mahrer | Switzerland | DNF | - |
| - | 16 | Martin Hangl | Switzerland | DNF | - |
| - | 11 | Alberto Tomba | Italy | DNF | - |
| - | 9 | Peter Roth | West Germany | DNF | - |
| - | 6 | Markus Wasmeier | West Germany | DNF | - |
| - | 3 | Marc Girardelli | Luxembourg | DNF | - |
| - | 2 | Michael Eder | West Germany | DNF | - |
| - | 96 | Tang Wei-tsu | Chinese Taipei | DQ | - |
| - | 81 | Ignacio Birkner | Argentina | DQ | - |
| - | 74 | Riccardo Stacchini | San Marino | DQ | - |
| - | 44 | A. J. Kitt | United States | DQ | - |
| | 100 | F. Alfredo Rego | Guatemala | DNS | |
| | 95 | Ahmet Demir | Turkey | DNS | |
| | 92 | Carlos Pruneda | Mexico | DNS | |
| | 71 | Giannis Stamatiou | Greece | DNS | |
| | 64 | Mauricio Rotella | Chile | DNS | |
| | 57 | Ronald Duncan | Great Britain | DNS | |
