= Alpine skiing at the 1988 Winter Olympics – Men's slalom =

Men's slalom at the XV Olympic Winter Games
- Alpine skiing
- Venue: Nakiska
- Date: February 27, 1988
- Competitors: 109 from 37 nations
- Winning time: 1:39.47

Medalists
1st place, gold medalist(s)		Alberto Tomba	Italy
2nd place, silver medalist(s)		Frank Wörndl	West Germany
3rd place, bronze medalist(s)		Paul Frommelt	Liechtenstein

The Men's slalom competition of the Calgary 1988 Olympics was held at Nakiska.

The defending world champion was Frank Wörndl of West Germany, while Yugoslavia's Bojan Križaj was the defending World Cup slalom champion and Alberto Tomba the leader of the 1988 World Cup.

== Results ==
Rank	Name	Country	Run 1	Run 2	Total	Difference
1st place, gold medalist(s)	Alberto Tomba	Italy	0:51.62	0:47.85	1:39.47	-
2nd place, silver medalist(s)	Frank Wörndl	West Germany	0:50.99	0:48.54	1:39.53	+0.06
3rd place, bronze medalist(s)	Paul Frommelt	Liechtenstein	0:51.69	0:48.15	1:39.84	+0.37
4	Bernhard Gstrein	Austria	0:51.87	0:48.21	1:40.08	+0.61
5	Ingemar Stenmark	Sweden	0:52.71	0:47.51	1:40.22	+0.75
6	Jonas Nilsson	Sweden	0:51.44	0:48.79	1:40.23	+0.76
7	Pirmin Zurbriggen	Switzerland	0:52.05	0:48.43	1:40.48	+1.01
8	Oswald Tötsch	Italy	0:52.44	0:48.11	1:40.55	+1.08
9	Grega Benedik	Yugoslavia	0:52.34	0:49.04	1:41.38	+1.91
10	Florian Beck	West Germany	0:53.11	0:48.33	1:41.44	+1.97
11	Rok Petrovič	Yugoslavia	0:53.05	0:48.58	1:41.63	+2.16
12	Tetsuya Okabe	Japan	0:53.11	0:48.82	1:41.93	+2.46
13	Peter Jurko	Czechoslovakia	0:53.50	0:48.71	1:42.21	+2.74
14	Alain Villiard	Canada	0:54.33	0:49.44	1:43.77	+4.30
15	Adrian Bireš	Czechoslovakia	0:54.88	0:50.25	1:45.13	+5.66
16	Petar Popangelov	Bulgaria	0:55.14	0:51.20	1:46.34	+6.87
17	Simon Wi Rutene	New Zealand	0:55.80	0:51.58	1:47.38	+7.91
18	Luis Fernández Ochoa	Spain	0:56.85	0:53.18	1:50.03	+10.56
19	Borislav Dimitrachkov	Bulgaria	0:57.58	0:53.23	1:50.81	+11.34
19	Lyubomir Popov	Bulgaria	0:57.78	0:53.03	1:50.81	+11.34
21	Robbie Hourmont	Great Britain	0:58.21	0:53.38	1:51.59	+12.12
22	Matthias Hubrich	New Zealand	0:58.16	0:54.08	1:52.24	+12.77
23	Stefan Shalamanov	Bulgaria	0:58.68	0:53.69	1:52.37	+12.90
24	Daníel Hilmarsson	Iceland	0:58.98	0:56.31	1:55.29	+15.82
25	Juan Pablo Santiagos	Chile	1:00.31	0:55.51	1:55.82	+16.35
26	Jorge Birkner	Argentina	1:01.11	0:55.86	1:56.97	+17.50
27	Kang Nak-Youn	South Korea	1:04.20	0:59.53	2:03.73	+24.26
28	Nam Won-Gi	South Korea	1:05.10	0:59.19	2:04.29	+24.82
29	Park Jae-Hyuk	South Korea	1:05.90	0:58.40	2:04.30	+24.83
30	Hubertus von Fürstenberg-von Hohenlohe	Mexico	1:07.36	1:00.57	2:07.93	+28.46
31	Yakup Kadri Birinci	Turkey	1:09.08	1:02.11	2:11.19	+31.72
32	Sokratis Aristodimou	Cyprus	1:11.48	1:04.62	2:16.10	+36.63
33	Resul Sare	Turkey	1:14.78	1:01.81	2:16.59	+37.12
34	Toni Salame	Lebanon	1:12.74	1:04.23	2:16.97	+37.50
35	Ahmet Demir	Turkey	1:11.29	1:06.24	2:17.53	+38.06
36	Göksay Demirhan	Turkey	1:13.22	1:04.99	2:18.21	+38.74
37	Alex Christian Benoit	Mexico	1:18.77	1:04.38	2:23.15	+43.68
38	Guillermo Avila	Bolivia	1:16.57	1:07.83	2:24.40	+44.93
39	Carlos Andrés Bruderer	Guatemala	1:16.87	1:09.43	2:26.30	+46.83
40	Karim Sabbagh	Lebanon	1:16.52	1:10.15	2:26.67	+47.20
41	Ahmad Ouachit	Morocco	1:19.17	1:12.36	2:31.53	+52.06
42	Ahmed Ait Moulay	Morocco	1:20.36	1:12.81	2:33.17	+53.70
43	Kevin Wilson	Puerto Rico	1:21.73	1:13.45	2:35.18	+55.71
44	Francesco Cardelli	San Marino	1:20.40	1:14.81	2:35.21	+55.74
45	Nicola Ercolani	San Marino	1:32.97	1:05.85	2:38.82	+59.35
46	Manuel Aramayo	Bolivia	1:24.85	1:17.46	2:42.31	+62.84
47	Lotfi Housnialaoui	Morocco	1:35.61	1:14.03	2:49.64	+70.17
48	Chen Tong-Jong	Chinese Taipei	1:33.57	1:17.53	2:51.10	+71.63
49	Kishor Rahtna Rai	India	1:31.42	1:20.79	2:52.21	+72.74
50	Luis Viscarra	Bolivia	1:30.45	1:23.93	2:54.38	+74.91
51	Julián Muñoz	Costa Rica	1:30.10	1:26.62	2:56.72	+77.25
52	Jason Edelmann	Puerto Rico	1:48.34	1:10.38	2:58.72	+79.25
53	Enrique Montano	Bolivia	1:44.04	1:23.37	3:07.41	+87.94
54	Alfredo Rego	Guatemala	1:46.49	1:33.79	3:20.28	+100.81
-	Thomas Stangassinger	Austria	0:52.42	DNF	-	-
-	Günther Mader	Austria	0:52.69	DNF	-	-
-	Carlo Gerosa	Italy	0:53.06	DQ	-	-
-	Lars-Göran Halvarsson	Sweden	0:53.33	DQ	-	-
-	Didier Bouvet	France	0:53.34	DNF	-	-
-	Finn Christian Jagge	Norway	0:53.40	DNF	-	-
-	Johan Wallner	Sweden	0:54.05	DNF	-	-
-	Christian Gaidet	France	0:54.23	DNF	-	-
-	Jack Miller	United States	0:55.00	DNF	-	-
-	Sergey Petrik	Soviet Union	0:55.39	DNF	-	-
-	Yves Tavernier	France	0:55.39	DNS	-	-
-	Javier Rivara	Argentina	1:01.12	DQ	-	-
-	Christian Bruderer	Guatemala	1:19.30	DNF	-	-
-	Carlos Pruneda	Mexico	1:41.94	DNF	-	-
-	Jim Read	Canada	DNF	-	-	-
-	Joël Gaspoz	Switzerland	DNF	-	-	-
-	Armin Bittner	West Germany	DNF	-	-	-
-	Rudi Nierlich	Austria	DNF	-	-	-
-	Felix McGrath	United States	DNF	-	-	-
-	Peter Roth	West Germany	DNF	-	-	-
-	Robert Žan	Yugoslavia	DNF	-	-	-
-	Chiaki Ishioka	Japan	DNF	-	-	-
-	Alex Williams	United States	DNF	-	-	-
-	Klemen Bergant	Yugoslavia	DNF	-	-	-
-	Hans Pieren	Switzerland	DNF	-	-	-
-	Michael Tommy	Canada	DNF	-	-	-
-	Ivano Camozzi	Italy	DNF	-	-	-
-	Gregor Hoop	Liechtenstein	DNF	-	-	-
-	Konstantin Chistyakov	Soviet Union	DNF	-	-	-
-	Greg Grossmann	Canada	DNF	-	-	-
-	Jorge Pujol	Spain	DNF	-	-	-
-	Gerald Näscher	Liechtenstein	DNF	-	-	-
-	Elias Majdalani	Lebanon	DNF	-	-	-
-	Delfin Campo	Spain	DNF	-	-	-
-	Richard Biggins	Australia	DNF	-	-	-
-	Morgan Jones	Great Britain	DNF	-	-	-
-	Giannis Stamatiou	Greece	DNF	-	-	-
-	Gerard Escoda	Andorra	DNF	-	-	-
-	Mauricio Rotella	Chile	DNF	-	-	-
-	Ignacio Birkner	Argentina	DNF	-	-	-
-	Ioannis Kapraras	Greece	DNF	-	-	-
-	Alekhis Fotiadis	Cyprus	DNF	-	-	-
-	Jorge Carlos Eiras	Argentina	DNF	-	-	-
-	Fabio Guardigli	San Marino	DNF	-	-	-
-	Hur Seung-Wook	South Korea	DNF	-	-	-
-	Jorge Torruellas	Puerto Rico	DNF	-	-	-
-	Ong Ching-Ming	Chinese Taipei	DNF	-	-	-
-	Jean-Luc Crétier	France	DQ	-	-	-
-	Paul Accola	Switzerland	DQ	-	-	-
-	Bob Ormsby	United States	DQ	-	-	-
-	Silvio Wille	Liechtenstein	DQ	-	-	-
-	Paulo Oppliger	Chile	DQ	-	-	-
-	Gul Dev	India	DQ	-	-	-
-	Tang Wei-Tsu	Chinese Taipei	DQ	-	-	-
-	Pierre Succar	Lebanon	DQ	-	-	-
