= List of flag bearers for Puerto Rico at the Olympics =

Puerto Rico at the Olympics
- IOC code: PUR
- NOC: Puerto Rico Olympic Committee
- Website: www.copur.pr (in Spanish)
- Medals: Gold 2 Silver 2 Bronze 8 Total 12

Summer appearances
- 1948; 1952; 1956; 1960; 1964; 1968; 1972; 1976; 1980; 1984; 1988; 1992; 1996; 2000; 2004; 2008; 2012; 2016; 2020; 2024

Winter appearances
- 1984; 1988; 1992; 1994; 1998; 2002; 2006–2014; 2018; 2022; 2026

This is a list of flag bearers who have represented Puerto Rico at the Olympics.

Flag bearers carry the national flag of their country at the opening ceremony of the Olympic Games.

#	Event year	Season	Flag bearer	Sport	Ref.
1	1948	Summer	José Vicente (Note: Carried a United States flag)	Athletics	
2	1952	Summer	Jaime Annexy	Athletics	
3	1956	Summer	Daniel Cintrón	Official	
4	1960	Summer	Toñín Casillas	Basketball	
5	1964	Summer	Rolando Cruz	Athletics	
6	1968	Summer	Jaime Frontera	Basketball	
7	1972	Summer	Arnaldo Bristol	Athletics	
8	1976	Summer	Téofilo Colón	Athletics (did not compete)	
9	1980	Summer	Alberto Mercado (Note: Carried an Olympic flag)	Boxing	
10	1984	Winter	George Tucker	Luge	
11	1984	Summer	Fernando Cañales	Swimming	
12	1988	Winter	Mary Pat Wilson	Alpine skiing	
13	1988	Summer	Jesús Feliciano	Baseball	
14	1992	Winter	Jorge Bonnet	Bobsleigh	
15	1992	Summer	Luis Martínez	Judo	
16	1994	Winter	Liston Bochette	Bobsleigh	
17	1996	Summer	Ivelisse Echevarría	Softball	
18	1998	Winter	José Ferrer	Bobsleigh	
19	2000	Summer	Enrique Figueroa	Sailing	
20	2002	Winter	Manuel Repollet	Bobsleigh (did not compete)	
21	2004	Summer	Carlos Arroyo	Basketball	
22	2008	Summer	McWilliams Arroyo	Boxing	
23	2012	Summer	Javier Culson	Athletics	
24	2016	Summer	Jaime Espinal	Wrestling	
25	2018	Winter	Charles Flaherty	Alpine skiing	
26	2020	Summer	Adriana Díaz	Table tennis	
26	2020	Summer	Brian Afanador	Table tennis	
27	2022	Winter	William Flaherty	Alpine skiing	
28	2024	Summer	Jasmine Camacho-Quinn	Athletics	
28	2024	Summer	Sebastian Rivera	Wrestling	
29	2026	Winter	Kellie Delka	Skeleton	

== See also ==
- Puerto Rico at the Olympics
