= Puerto Rico at the Olympics =

- Flag of Puerto Rico
- IOC code: PUR
- NOC: Puerto Rico Olympic Committee
- Website: www.copur.pr (in Spanish)
- Medals Ranked 92nd: Gold 2 Silver 2 Bronze 8 Total 12

Summer appearances
- 1948; 1952; 1956; 1960; 1964; 1968; 1972; 1976; 1980; 1984; 1988; 1992; 1996; 2000; 2004; 2008; 2012; 2016; 2020; 2024; 2028

Winter appearances
- 1984; 1988; 1992; 1994; 1998; 2002; 2006–2014; 2018; 2022; 2026

Flag used by Puerto Rican teams at the 1948 and 1952 Games. The current flag of Puerto Rico was legalized during the 1952 Summer Olympics, and the Puerto Rican team began to use it immediately.

Puerto Rico first participated at the Olympic Games in 1948, and has sent athletes to compete in every Summer Olympic Games since then. The nation has also participated in the Winter Olympic Games since 1984, but did not participate in the Games from 2006 to 2014.

Puerto Rican athletes have won a total of twelve medals. Six medals were won in boxing, three in track and field, one in tennis, and two in wrestling.

The Puerto Rican national baseball team won a bronze medal at the 1988 Summer Olympic Games in Seoul, South Korea, but that medal is not counted among Puerto Rico's Olympic medal totals as baseball was an exhibition sport during those Games.

The Puerto Rico Olympic Committee was created in 1948 and recognized by the International Olympic Committee that same year. "La Borinqueña" (not the U.S. national anthem) is played when Puerto Rican competitors win Olympic gold medals.

== Flag Bearers ==
Flag Bearers
#	Year	Season	Flag Bearer	Sport
1	1948	Summer	José Vicente	Athletics
2	1952	Summer	Jaime Annexy	Athletics
3	1956	Summer	Daniel Cintrón	Official
4	1960	Summer	Toñín Casillas	Basketball
5	1964	Summer	Rolando Cruz	Athletics
6	1968	Summer	Jaime Frontera	Basketball
7	1972	Summer	Arnaldo Bristol	Athletics
8	1976	Summer	Téofilo Colón	Athletics (did not compete)
9	1980	Summer	Alberto Mercado	Boxing
10	1984	Winter	George Tucker	Luge
11	1984	Summer	Fernando Cañales	Swimming
12	1988	Winter	Mary Pat Wilson	Alpine skiing
13	1988	Summer	Jesús Feliciano	Baseball
14	1992	Winter	Jorge Bonnet	Bobsleigh
15	1992	Summer	Luis Martínez	Judo
16	1994	Winter	Liston Bochette	Bobsleigh
17	1996	Summer	Ivelisse Echevarría	Softball
18	1998	Winter	José Ferrer	Bobsleigh
19	2000	Summer	Enrique Figueroa	Sailing
20	2002	Winter	Manuel Repollet	Bobsleigh (did not compete)
21	2004	Summer	Carlos Arroyo	Basketball
22	2008	Summer	McWilliams Arroyo	Boxing
23	2012	Summer	Javier Culson	Athletics
24	2016	Summer	Jaime Espinal	Wrestling
25	2018	Winter	Charles Flaherty	Alpine skiing
26	2020	Summer	Adriana Díaz	Table tennis
26	2020	Summer	Brian Afanador	Table tennis
27	2022	Winter	William Flaherty	Alpine skiing
27	2022	Winter	Kellie Delka	Skeleton
28	2024	Summer	Jasmine Camacho-Quinn	Athletics
28	2024	Summer	Sebastian Rivera	Wrestling
29	2026	Winter	Kellie Delka	Skeleton

== Medal tables ==
=== Medals by Summer Games ===
Games	Athletes	Gold	Silver	Bronze	Total	Rank
(United Kingdom) 1948 London	9	0	0	1	1	34
(Finland) 1952 Helsinki	21	0	0	0	0	–
(Australia) 1956 Melbourne	10	0	0	0	0	–
(Italy) 1960 Rome	27	0	0	0	0	–
(Japan) 1964 Tokyo	32	0	0	0	0	–
1968 Mexico City	58	0	0	0	0	–
(Germany) 1972 Munich	53	0	0	0	0	–
(Canada) 1976 Montreal	80	0	0	1	1	37
(Soviet Union) 1980 Moscow	3	0	0	0	0	–
(United States) 1984 Los Angeles	51	0	1	1	2	30
(South Korea) 1988 Seoul	47	0	0	0	0	–
(Spain) 1992 Barcelona	75	0	0	1	1	54
(United States) 1996 Atlanta	69	0	0	1	1	71
(Australia) 2000 Sydney	29	0	0	0	0	–
(Greece) 2004 Athens	43	0	0	0	0	–
(China) 2008 Beijing	22	0	0	0	0	–
(United Kingdom) 2012 London	25	0	1	1	2	63
(Brazil) 2016 Rio de Janeiro	40	1	0	0	1	54
(Japan) 2020 Tokyo	37	1	0	0	1	63
(France) 2024 Paris	51	0	0	2	2	80
(United States) 2028 Los Angeles	future event					
(Australia) 2032 Brisbane	future event					
Total		2	2	8	12	92

=== Medals by Winter Games ===
Games	Athletes	Gold	Silver	Bronze	Total	Rank
(Socialist Federal Republic of Yugoslavia) 1984 Sarajevo	1	0	0	0	0	–
(Canada) 1988 Calgary	9	0	0	0	0	–
(France) 1992 Albertville	6	0	0	0	0	–
(Norway) 1994 Lillehammer	5	0	0	0	0	–
(Japan) 1998 Nagano	6	0	0	0	0	–
(United States) 2002 Salt Lake City	2	0	0	0	0	–
(Italy) 2006 Turin	did not participate					
(Canada) 2010 Vancouver	did not participate					
(Russia) 2014 Sochi	did not participate					
(South Korea) 2018 Pyeongchang	1	0	0	0	0	–
(China) 2022 Beijing	2	0	0	0	0	–
(Italy) 2026 Milano Cortina	1	0	0	0	0	–
(France) 2030 French Alps	future event					
(United States) 2034 Utah	future event					
Total		0	0	0	0	–

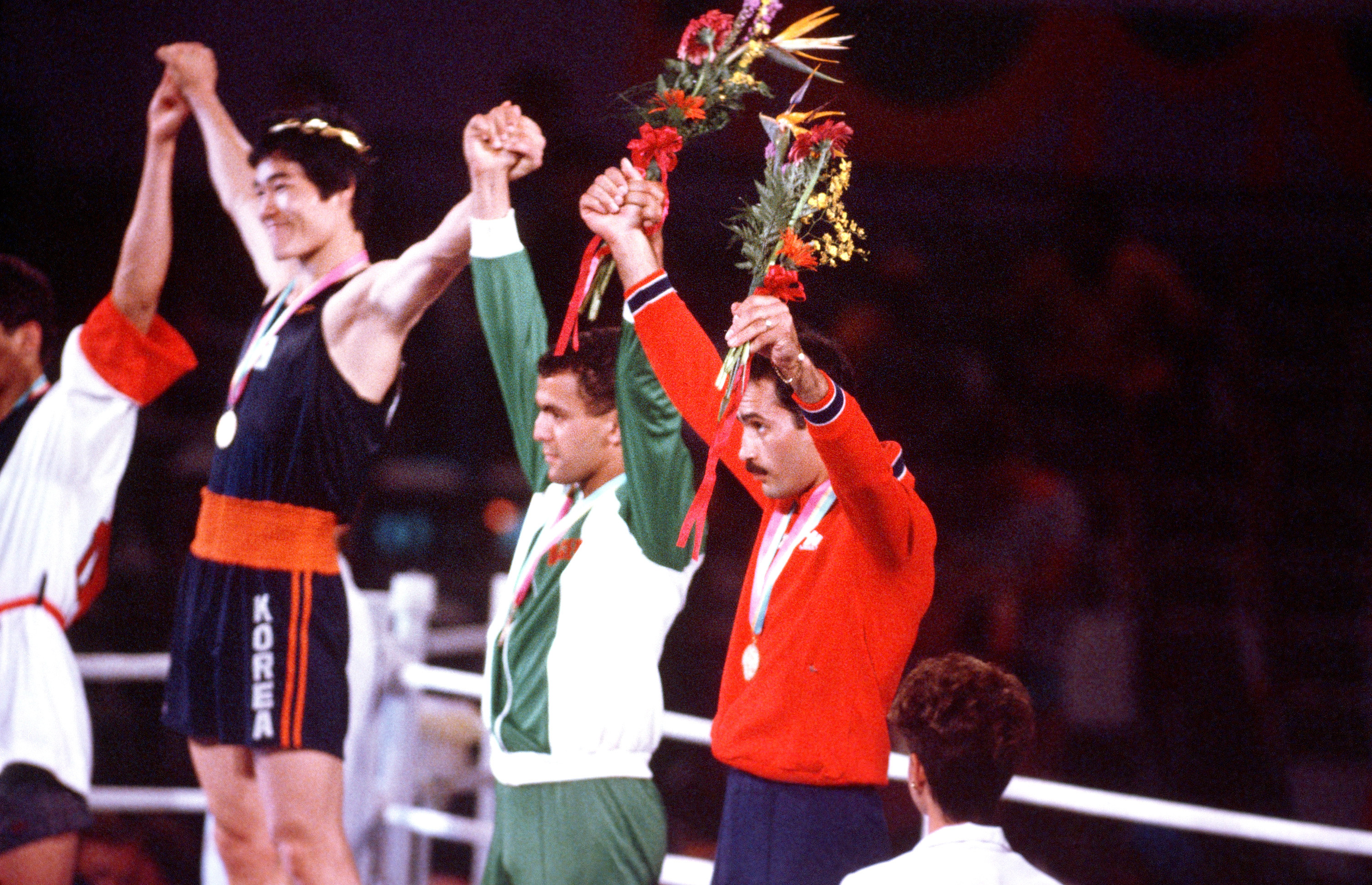
Aristides González (in red) after receiving a bronze medal at middleweight boxing in the 1984 Summer Olympics.

=== Medals by summer sport ===
Sports	Gold	Silver	Bronze	Total	Rank
Athletics	1	0	2	3	70
Tennis	1	0	0	1	20
Boxing	0	1	5	6	52
Wrestling	0	1	1	2	51
Total	2	2	8	12	92

== List of medalists ==
Medal	Name	Games	Sport	Event
Bronze	Juan Venegas	(United Kingdom) 1948 London	Boxing	Men's bantamweight
Bronze	Orlando Maldonado	(Canada) 1976 Montreal	Boxing	Men's light flyweight
Silver	Luis Ortiz	(United States) 1984 Los Angeles	Boxing	Men's lightweight
Bronze	Arístides González	(United States) 1984 Los Angeles	Boxing	Men's middleweight
Bronze	Aníbal Acevedo	(Spain) 1992 Barcelona	Boxing	Men's welterweight
Bronze	Daniel Santos	(United States) 1996 Atlanta	Boxing	Men's welterweight
Silver	Jaime Espinal	(United Kingdom) 2012 London	Wrestling	Men's freestyle 84 kg
Bronze	Javier Culson	(United Kingdom) 2012 London	Athletics	Men's 400 metres hurdles
Gold	Monica Puig	(Brazil) 2016 Rio de Janeiro	Tennis	Women's singles
Gold	Jasmine Camacho-Quinn	(Japan) 2020 Tokyo	Athletics	Women's 100 metres hurdles
Bronze	Jasmine Camacho-Quinn	(France) 2024 Paris	Athletics	Women's 100 metres hurdles
Bronze	Sebastian Rivera	(France) 2024 Paris	Wrestling	Men's freestyle 65kg

== See also ==
- List of flag bearers for Puerto Rico at the Olympics
- Puerto Rico Olympic Committee
- Category:Olympic competitors for Puerto Rico
- Tropical nations at the Winter Olympics
- Puerto Rico at the Paralympics
