= Puerto Rico at the 1988 Winter Olympics =

- IOC code: PUR
- NOC: Puerto Rico Olympic Committee
- Website: www.copur.pr (in Spanish)

in Calgary
- Competitors: 9 (8 men, 1 woman) in 3 sports
- Flag bearer: Mary Pat Wilson
- Medals: Gold 0 Silver 0 Bronze 0 Total 0

Winter Olympics appearances (overview)
- 1984; 1988; 1992; 1994; 1998; 2002; 2006–2014; 2018; 2022; 2026

Puerto Rico competed at the 1988 Winter Olympics held in Calgary, Canada, between 13 and 28 February 1988. It was the territory's second appearance at the Winter Olympics, having made its debut at the previous 1984 Winter Olympics in Sarajevo. The Puerto Rican delegation consisted of nine athletes competing in three sports. Puerto Rico did not win any medals at the Games.

== Background ==
The Puerto Rico Olympic Committee was recognized by the International Olympic Committee (IOC) in 1948. Puerto Rico made its first Olympic appearance at the 1948 Summer Olympics in London, and its Winter Olympics debut at the 1984 Winter Olympics in Sarajevo. The 1988 Winter Olympics was the nation's second consecutive appearance at the Winter Olympics.

The 1988 Winter Olympics was held in Calgary, Canada, between 13 and 28 February 1988. Alpine skier Mary Pat Wilson was the Puerto Rican flagbearer during the opening ceremony. Puerto Rico did not win a medal at the Games.

== Competitors ==
Nine Puerto Ricans including eight men and a woman competed across three sports in the Games.

Sport	Men	Women	Total
Alpine skiing	5	1	6
Biathlon	1	–	1
Luge	2	0	2
Total	8	1	9

== Alpine skiing ==
Puerto Rico qualified six athletes for the alpine skiing events at the 1988 Winter Olympics. This marked the territory's debut in the sport at the Winter Olympics. The alpine skiing events were held at the Nakiska Ski Resort on Mount Allan.

Mary Pat Wilson was the sole female alpine skier in the delegation, becoming the first woman to represent Puerto Rico at the Winter Olympics. Five men represented Puerto Rico in the alpine skiing events including Mary Pat Wilson's brother Kevin Wilson. The Wilson siblings were both born in Virginia in the United States, and had trained together for the Games.

In the men's events, Kevin Wilson recorded the best finish, after being classified in 43rd in the slalom. He finished 61st in the giant slalom. Jason Edelmann finished 52nd in both the super-G and slalom events. Félix Flechas and Walter Sandza both completed the giant slalom in 67th and 66th places respectively. Flechas did not finish the super-G while Sandza finished 56th. Jorge Torruellas did not finish the men's slalom event. In the women's events, Mary Pat Wilson was disqualified in the giant slalom and did not finish the slalom.

Athlete	Event	Run 1		Run 2		Total	
Athlete	Event	Time	Rank	Time	Rank	Time	Rank
Jason Edelmann	Men's super-G	—N/a				2:09.93	52
Jason Edelmann	Men's giant slalom	DNF					
Jason Edelmann	Men's slalom	1:48.34		1:10.38		2:58.72	52
Félix Flechas	Men's super-G	—N/a				DNF	
Félix Flechas	Men's giant slalom	1:38.01		1:34.99		3:13.00	67
Walter Sandza	Men's super-G	—N/a				2:25.95	56
Walter Sandza	Men's giant slalom	1:35.34		1:33.43		3:08.77	66
Jorge Torruellas	Men's slalom	DNF					
Kevin Wilson	Men's super-G	—N/a				DNF	
Kevin Wilson	Men's giant slalom	1:26.31		1:22.88		2:49.19	61
Kevin Wilson	Men's slalom	1:21.73		1:13.45		2:35.18	43
Mary Pat Wilson	Women's giant slalom	DSQ					
Mary Pat Wilson	Women's slalom	DNF					

== Biathlon ==
Puerto Rico qualified one athlete, Elliot Archilla, for the biathlon events at the 1988 Winter Olympics, marking the territory's debut in the sport at the Winter Olympics. This was Archilla's only participation in the Winter Olympics.

The biathlon events were held at the Canmore Nordic Centre. Archilla competed in both the 10 km sprint and the 20 km individual events. In the sprint event, held on 23 February 1988, he recorded a time of 47:47.4 with six missed targets, and finished last out of 72 competitors. In the individual event, held on 25 February 1988, he recorded an adjusted time of 1:51:57.6 with 13 missed targets, and finished 68th out of 72 competitors.

Athlete	Event	Time	Misses	Rank
Elliot Archilla	Sprint	47:47.4	6	72
Elliot Archilla	Individual	1'51:57.6	13	68

== Luge ==
Puerto Rico qualified two athletes for the men's singles luge event at the 1988 Winter Olympics: George Tucker and Raúl Muñiz. The luge events were held at the Canada Olympic Park sliding track in Calgary.

Tucker had represented Puerto Rico at the 1984 Winter Olympics in Sarajevo, where he had been the territory's sole competitor, finishing last in the luge event. His appearance in Sarajevo marked the first participation by a Caribbean athlete at the Winter Olympics. Tucker is a physicist, and was a doctoral student at Wesleyan University at the time of the 1984 Games. Muñiz, born in Albany, New York to Puerto Rican parents, had been introduced to the sport by Tucker when they met at Lake Placid in 1984.

In the event, Tucker finished 34th out of 38 competitors with a combined time of 3:27.125, while Muñiz finished 31st with a combined time of 3:20.962.

Athlete	Event	Run 1		Run 2		Run 3		Run 4		Total	
Athlete	Event	Time	Rank	Time	Rank	Time	Rank	Time	Rank	Time	Rank
George Tucker	Men's singles	50.748	36	50.249	34	51.688	33	54.440	36	3:27.125	34
Raúl Muñiz	Men's singles	50.184	35	49.849	33	50.480	32	50.449	33	3:20.962	31
