= Puerto Rico at the 1992 Winter Olympics =

- IOC code: PUR
- NOC: Puerto Rico Olympic Committee
- Website: www.copur.pr (in Spanish)

in Albertville
- Competitors: 6 (men) in 2 sports
- Flag bearer: Jorge Bonnet (bobsleigh)
- Medals: Gold 0 Silver 0 Bronze 0 Total 0

Winter Olympics appearances (overview)
- 1984; 1988; 1992; 1994; 1998; 2002; 2006–2014; 2018; 2022; 2026

Puerto Rico competed at the 1992 Winter Olympics held in Albertville, France, between 8 and 23 February 1992. It was the territory's third appearance at the Winter Olympics, since its debut at the 1984 Winter Olympics in Sarajevo. The Puerto Rican delegation consisted of six athletes competing in two sports. Puerto Rico did not win any medals at the Games.

== Background ==
The Puerto Rico Olympic Committee was recognized by the International Olympic Committee (IOC) in 1948. Puerto Rico made its first Olympic appearance at the 1948 Summer Olympics in London, and its Winter Olympics debut at the 1984 Winter Olympics in Sarajevo. The 1992 Winter Olympics was the nation's third appearance at the Winter Olympics.

The 1992 Winter Olympics was held in Albertville, France, between 8 and 23 February 1992. Bobsleigh racer Jorge Bonnet was the Puerto Rican flagbearer during the opening ceremony. Puerto Rico did not win a medal at the Games.

== Competitors ==
Six Puerto Ricans competed across two sports in the Games.

Sport	Men	Women	Total
Bobsleigh	4	0	4
Freestyle skiing	2	0	2
Total	6	0	6

== Bobsleigh ==
Puerto Rico qualified two sleds for the men's two-man event. This was Puerto Rico's debut participation in the bobsleigh event at the Winter Olympics. The bobsleigh events were held at Piste de Bobsleigh et Luge, La Plagne.

The two-man event was held on 15 and 16 February 1992. Puerto Rica was represented by John Amabile and Jorge Bonnet in the first sled, and Liston Bochette and Douglas Rosado in the second sled. Amabile, who was born in the United States, was making his Winter Olympics debut. Bonnet was a judoka, and had won a bronze medal in judo at the 1990 Central American and Caribbean Games. While he has earlier represented Puerto Rico at the 1984 and 1988 Summer Olympics in Judo, he was competing in his first Winter Olympics.

Bochette was born in Florida and was a track and field athlete. He was the captain of the athletic team at the University of Florida. He later switched his allegiance to Puerto Rico and competed in decathlon, in which he set a national record in 1988. He is a painter, and had served as an official at the 1988 Winter Olympics. Rosado made his Winter Olympics alongside Bochette.

Bochette and Rosado were classified 39th out of the 46 teams after the first run. However, they progressively finished worse across the next three runs, and were classified as 40th in the final classification. Amabile and Bonnet were classified 43rd in the first run, but dropped to last in each of the next three runs. They were the final classified team in the rankings.

Sled	Athletes	Event	Run 1		Run 2		Run 3		Run 4		Total	
Sled	Athletes	Event	Time	Rank	Time	Rank	Time	Rank	Time	Rank	Time	Rank
PUR-1	Liston Bochette; Douglas Rosado	Men's Two-man	1:03.09	39	1:03.64	40	1:03.86	42	1:03.48	41	4:14.07	40
PUR-2	John Amabile; Jorge Bonnet	Men's Two-man	1:03.51	43	1:29.57	46	1:04.51	46	1:04.02	43	4:41.61	46

== Freestyle skiing ==
Puerto Rico qualified two athletes for the men's moguls event. This was Puerto Rico's debut participation in the freestyle skiing event at the Winter Olympics. The freestyle skiing events were held at Tignes.

The men's moguls event was held on 12 and 13 February 1992. Puerto Rica was represented by Jorge Torruellas and Luis González. While this was the only Winter Olympic participation for Gonzalez, Torruellas had qualified for the alpine skiing events at the 1988 Winter Olympics.

In the qualification rounds, both the Puerto Rican athletes fared poorly, occupying the last two positions out of the 47 participants, and did not qualify for the finals.

Athlete	Event	Qualification			Final		
Athlete	Event	Time	Points	Rank	Time	Points	Rank
Jorge Torruellas	Men's moguls	1:05.28	4.00	47	Did not advance		
Luis González	Men's moguls	1:00.98	4.15	46	Did not advance		
