= Puerto Rico at the 1998 Winter Olympics =

- IOC code: PUR
- NOC: Puerto Rico Olympic Committee
- Website: www.copur.pr (in Spanish)

in Nagano
- Competitors: 6 (6 men and 0 women) in 2 sports
- Flag bearer: José Ferrer
- Medals: Gold 0 Silver 0 Bronze 0 Total 0

Winter Olympics appearances (overview)
- 1984; 1988; 1992; 1994; 1998; 2002; 2006–2014; 2018; 2022; 2026

Puerto Rico competed at the 1998 Winter Olympics held in Nagano, Japan, between 7 and 22 February 1998. It was the territory's fifth appearance at the Winter Olympics, since its debut at the 1984 Winter Olympics in Sarajevo. The Puerto Rican delegation consisted of six athletes competing in two sports. It did not win any medals at the Games.

== Background ==
The Puerto Rico Olympic Committee was recognized by the International Olympic Committee (IOC) in 1948. Puerto Rico made its first Olympic appearance at the 1948 Summer Olympics in London, and its Winter Olympics debut at the 1984 Winter Olympics in Sarajevo. The 1998 Winter Olympics was the nation's fifth appearance at the Winter Olympics.

The 1998 Winter Olympics was held in Nagano, Japan, between 7 and 22 February 1998. Bobsleigh racer Jose Ferer was the Puerto Rican flagbearer during the opening ceremony. Puerto Rico did not win a medal at the Games.

== Competitors ==
Six Puerto Ricans competed at the Games across two sports.

Sport	Men	Women	Total
Alpine skiing	1	0	1
Bobsleigh	5	–	5
Total	6	0	6

== Alpine skiing ==
Puerto Rico qualified one athlete for the Alpine skiing events at the 1998 Winter Olympics. This was Puerto Rico's second participation in the Alpine skiing event at the Winter Olympics since it made its debut at the 1998 Winter Olympics. The events were held at Mount Yakebitai, Shiga Kogen, Yamanouchi.

The men's slalom event was held on 21 February 1998. Puerto Rica was represented by William Schenker. Schenker was born in New York City, was competing at his first and only Winter Olympics. At the event, Schenker completed his first run with a time of one minute and 12.95 seconds to be ranked 37th out of the 65 participants. Though he took longer in the second run, he was ranked 31st rank. With an overall time of two minutes and 28.88 seconds, he was classified in 31st in the overall classification.

Athlete	Event	Race 1	Race 2	Total	
Athlete	Event	Time	Time	Time	Rank
William Schenker	Slalom	1:12.95	1:15.93	2:28.88	31

== Bobsleigh ==
Puerto Rico qualified two sleds for the bobsleigh events at the 1998 Winter Olympics: one for the men's two-man event and one for the men's four-man event. This was Puerto Rico's third consecutive participation in the bobsleigh event at the Winter Olympics since it made its debut at the 1992 Winter Olympics. Both events were held at the Spiral, the first artificially refrigerated track in Asia, located in Iizuna, north of Nagano.

=== Two-man ===
The two-man event was held on 14 and 15 February 1998. Puerto Rica was represented by pilot John Amabile and Joseph Keosseian. Amabile, who was born in the United States, had been part of the Puerto Rican bobsleigh team at the 1992 and 1994 Winter Olympics and was competing at his third and final Winter Olympics. This was the first and only Olympic participation for Keosseian. Amabile and Keosseian were classified 37th out of the 38 competing teams after first run. However, they did not register a finish in the second run, and was not classified in the final rankings.

=== Four-man ===
The four-man event was held on 20 and 21 February 1998. Due to poor weather conditions on the first day of competition, the scheduled second run was cancelled, and the competition comprised only three runs in total instead of the usual four. Puerto Rico was represented by Keosseian, Liston Bochette, Jorge Bonnet, and José Ferrer. Except Keosseian, this was the same crew that had competed for Puerto Rico at the 1994 Winter Olympics in Lillehammer and finished 25th, the best ever finish for Puerto Rico.

Bochette was born in Florida and was a track and field athlete. He was the captain of the athletic team at the University of Florida. He later switched his allegiance to Puerto Rico and compete in decathlon, in which he set a national record in 1988. He is a painter, and had also served as an official at the 1988 Winter Olympics. Bonnet was a judoka, and represented Puerto Rico at the 1984 and 1988 Summer Olympics. He had won a bronze medal in judo at the 1990 Central American and Caribbean Games. Bonnet and Bochette were competing in third Olympics, while Ferrer is competing in the second Olympics.

The crew set a time of just over 56 seconds in their first run and improved slightly in their second run. However, they did not complete the third run, and was not classified in the final rankings.

Sled	Athletes	Event	Run 1		Run 2		Run 3		Run 4		Total	
Sled	Athletes	Event	Time	Rank	Time	Rank	Time	Rank	Time	Rank	Time	Rank
PUR-1	John Amabile; Joseph Keosseian	Two-man	57.35	37	DSQ	–	–	–	–	–	DSQ	–

Sled	Athletes	Event	Run 1		Run 2		Run 3		Total	
Sled	Athletes	Event	Time	Rank	Time	Rank	Time	Rank	Time	Rank
PUR-1	Liston Bochette; Jorge Bonnet; José Ferrer; Joseph Keosseian	Four-man	56.45	32	55.96	31	DSQ	–	DSQ	–
