= Puerto Rico at the 1994 Winter Olympics =

- IOC code: PUR
- NOC: Puerto Rico Olympic Committee
- Website: www.copur.pr (in Spanish)

in Lillehammer
- Competitors: 5 in 1 sport
- Flag bearer: Liston Bochette
- Medals: Gold 0 Silver 0 Bronze 0 Total 0

Winter Olympics appearances (overview)
- 1984; 1988; 1992; 1994; 1998; 2002; 2006–2014; 2018; 2022; 2026

Puerto Rico competed at the 1994 Winter Olympics held in Lillehammer, Norway, between 12 and 27 February 1994. It was the territory's fourth appearance at the Winter Olympics, since its debut at the 1984 Winter Olympics in Sarajevo. The Puerto Rican delegation consisted of five athletes competing in a single sport. It did not win any medals at the Games.

== Background ==
The Puerto Rico Olympic Committee was recognized by the International Olympic Committee (IOC) in 1948. Puerto Rico made its first Olympic appearance at the 1948 Summer Olympics in London, and its Winter Olympics debut at the 1984 Winter Olympics in Sarajevo. The 1994 Winter Olympics was the nation's fourth appearance at the Winter Olympics.

The 1994 Winter Olympics was held in Lillehammer, Norway, between 12 and 27 February 1994. Bobsleigh racer Liston Bochette was the Puerto Rican flagbearer during the opening ceremony. Puerto Rico did not win a medal at the Games.

== Competitors ==
Five Puerto Ricans competed at the Games across two sports.

Sport	Men	Women	Total
Bobsleigh	5	–	5
Total	5	0	5

== Bobsleigh ==
Puerto Rico qualified two sleds for the bobsleigh events at the 1994 Winter Olympics: one for the men's two-man event and one for the men's four-man event. This was Puerto Rico's second consecutive participation in the bobsleigh event at the Winter Olympics since it made its debut at the 1992 Winter Olympics. Both events were held at Olympiske Bob-og Akebane, Hunderfossen.

=== Two-man ===
The two-man event was held on 19 and 20 February 1994. Puerto Rica was represented by John Amabile and Jorge Bonnet. Amabile, who was born in the United States, had been part of the Puerto Rican bobsleigh team at the 1992, was competing at his second Winter Olympics.

Bonnet was a judoka, and represented Puerto Rico at the 1984 and 1988 Summer Olympics. He had won a bronze medal in judo at the 1990 Central American and Caribbean Games. He was competing in his second Winter Olympics.

Amabile and Bonnet were classified 40th out of the 43 competing teams after first run. They were progressively ranked 42nd and 41st in the next two runs respectively. They had their best finish in the fourth run, being ranked at 39th. However, they were classified 40th in the final rankings.

Sled	Athletes	Event	Run 1		Run 2		Run 3		Run 4		Total	
Sled	Athletes	Event	Time	Rank	Time	Rank	Time	Rank	Time	Rank	Time	Rank
PUR-1	John Amabile; Jorge Bonnet	Two-man	55.18	40	55.46	42	55.38	41	55.19	39	3:41.21	40

=== Four-man ===
The four-man event was held on 26 and 27 February 1994. Puerto Rico was represented by Bonnet, Douglas Rosado, Liston Bochette, and José Ferrer.

Bochette was born in Florida and was a track and field athlete. He was the captain of the athletic team at the University of Florida. He later switched his allegiance to Puerto Rico and compete in decathlon, in which he set a national record in 1988. He is a painter, and had also served as an official at the 1988 Winter Olympics. Rosado was competing in his second Winter Olympics, while Ferrer was making his debut at the Winter Olympics.

The crew set a time of just over 53 seconds in all their four runs, and was classified 25th in the final rankings. This was the best ever finish for Puerto Rico in the four-man bobsleigh event.

Sled	Athletes	Event	Run 1		Run 2		Run 3		Run 4		Total	
Sled	Athletes	Event	Time	Rank	Time	Rank	Time	Rank	Time	Rank	Time	Rank
PUR-1	Liston Bochette; José Ferrer; Jorge Bonnet; Douglas Rosado	Four-man	53.52	26	53.50	26	53.57	25	53.43	25	3:34.02	25
