= Luge at the 1988 Winter Olympics – Men's singles =

Men's singles at the XV Olympic Winter Games
- Venue: Canada Olympic Park
- Dates: 14–15 February 1988
- Competitors: 38 from 18 nations
- Winning time: 3:05.548

Medalists
1st place, gold medalist(s)		Jens Müller	East Germany
2nd place, silver medalist(s)		Georg Hackl	West Germany
3rd place, bronze medalist(s)		Yury Kharchenko	Soviet Union

The men's singles luge competition at the 1988 Winter Olympics in Calgary was held on 14 and 15 February, at Canada Olympic Park.

== Results ==
Rank	Athlete	Country	Run 1	Run 2	Run 3	Run 4	Total
1st place, gold medalist(s)	Jens Müller	East Germany	46.301	46.444	46.436	46.367	3:05.548
2nd place, silver medalist(s)	Georg Hackl	West Germany	46.355	46.553	46.599	46.409	3:05.916
3rd place, bronze medalist(s)	Yury Kharchenko	Soviet Union	46.391	46.605	46.475	46.803	3:06.274
4	Thomas Jacob	East Germany	46.426	46.638	46.433	46.861	3:06.358
5	Michael Walter	East Germany	46.578	46.754	46.838	46.763	3:06.933
6	Sergey Danilin	Soviet Union	46.564	46.827	46.648	47.059	3:07.098
7	Johannes Schettel	West Germany	46.725	46.928	46.805	46.913	3:07.371
8	Hansjörg Raffl	Italy	46.590	46.971	46.893	47.071	3:07.525
9	Otto Mayregger	Austria	46.777	46.986	46.925	46.931	3:07.619
10	Paul Hildgartner	Italy	46.844	46.854	46.764	47.234	3:07.696
11	Markus Prock	Austria	46.637	46.632	47.637	46.829	3:07.735
12	Frank Masley	United States	46.813	46.890	46.813	47.427	3:07.943
13	Max Burghardtswieser	West Germany	46.874	46.949	47.083	47.280	3:08.186
14	Duncan Kennedy	United States	47.032	47.065	47.093	47.282	3:08.472
15	Kurt Brugger	Italy	47.084	47.362	47.045	47.130	3:08.621
16	Petr Urban	Czechoslovakia	46.917	47.215	47.133	47.359	3:08.624
17	Valery Dudin	Soviet Union	47.812	46.982	47.061	47.025	3:08.880
18	Kazuhiko Takamatsu	Japan	47.278	47.235	47.326	47.176	3:09.015
19	Harington Telford	Canada	47.152	47.564	47.119	47.463	3:09.298
20	Mikael Holm	Sweden	47.409	47.165	47.423	47.661	3:09.658
21	Luboš Jíra	Czechoslovakia	47.647	47.569	47.819	47.822	3:10.857
22	Macleod Nicol	Great Britain	47.701	47.679	47.569	48.000	3:10.949
23	Jon Owen	United States	47.670	47.632	47.834	48.328	3:11.464
24	Chris Wightman	Canada	47.855	47.856	47.773	48.182	3:11.666
25	Anders Näsström	Sweden	47.517	47.931	48.083	48.191	3:11.722
26	Toru Ito	Japan	47.753	47.880	48.601	48.439	3:12.673
27	Nil Labrecque	Canada	47.461	47.866	49.307	48.093	3:12.727
28	Nick Ovett	Great Britain	48.181	48.163	48.518	48.446	3:13.308
29	Pablo García	Spain	48.702	47.953	48.708	48.115	3:13.478
30	Stephen Brialey	Great Britain	49.689	48.687	47.568	47.677	3:13.621
31	Raúl Muñiz	Puerto Rico	50.184	49.849	50.480	50.449	3:20.962
32	Sun Kuang-Ming	Chinese Taipei	49.601	51.584	48.986	51.429	3:21.600
33	Rubén González	Argentina	49.567	49.628	53.685	48.947	3:21.827
34	George Tucker	Puerto Rico	50.748	50.249	51.688	54.440	3:27.125
35	Raymond Ocampo	Philippines	54.703	51.617	51.926	49.415	3:27.661
36	Bart Carpentier Alting	Netherlands Antilles	50.802	53.468	53.501	52.142	3:29.913
-	Gerhard Sandbichler	Austria	46.911	46.990	DNF	-	-
-	Peter Beck	Liechtenstein	47.319	DNF	-	-	-
