= Bruderer =

Bruderer is a surname. Notable people with the surname include:

- Carlos Andrés Bruderer (born 1967), Guatemalan alpine skier
- Christian Bruderer (born 1968), Guatemalan alpine skier
- Nicolle Bruderer (born 1993), Guatemalan cyclist
- Pascale Bruderer (born 1977), Swiss politician
