= Charles Flaherty (alpine skier) =

Alpine skier who competed for Puerto Rico in the 2018 Winter Olympics

Personal information
- Born: December 19, 2000 (age 25) Cincinnati, Ohio, United States

Skiing career
- Sport: Alpine skiing ♂
- Disciplines: Giant slalom

Olympics
- Teams: 1 – (2018)
- Medals: 0 (0 gold)

World Championships
- Teams: 0
- Medals: 0 (0 gold)

Charles Flaherty (born December 19, 2000) is an American born alpine skier who competed for Puerto Rico in the 2018 Winter Olympics.

== Early life ==
Flaherty was born in Cincinnati, Ohio, United States. In 2008, Charles saved his younger brother's life by donating his bone marrow. His brother, William, was dying from hemophagocytic lymphohistiocytosis; his only chance at living was a bone marrow transplant. Charles, seven at the time, was found to be a match and willingly underwent a three-hour surgery to harvest the marrow, which successfully saved his younger brother.

In 2010, after a few years of recovery, the family moved to Puerto Rico. Charles was nine years old. He attended St John's School and TASIS Dorado before he switched to Laurel Springs School, an accredited online institution, in 2013. He and his family moved in 2015 from Dorado, to Rio Grande, and then back to Dorado.

Flaherty was 13 years old when he began skiing competitively. Watching the 2014 Winter Olympics sparked his interest in taking up the sport. Flaherty trained in Colorado from late October to late April each winter, and returned to Puerto Rico for the summers where he enjoyed kitesurfing and swimming in the warm Caribbean waters. He also did a lot of training in Canada and Chile each summer for a few weeks.

== Career ==
Flaherty had to convince the Puerto Rico Olympic Committee to allow him to compete for the island. In 2002, the bobsleigh team that was set to compete for Puerto Rico was withdrawn as one athlete (Michael Gonzales) did not meet Puerto Rico Olympic Committee rules about eligibility. After this, the Puerto Rico Olympic Committee withdrew the recognition of the Winter Sports Federation for the territory, effectively ending any hopes for athletes competing at the Winter Olympics. Alpine skier Kristina Krone qualified to represent the territory at both the 2010 and 2014 Winter Olympics in Vancouver and Sochi respectively. However, both times, the Puerto Rico Olympic Committee refused to even acknowledge her qualification, and the territory did not compete. In December 2017, the Puerto Rico Olympic Committee allowed a six-month temporary membership to the Winter Sports Federation, without funding, thus allowing the territory to compete at the 2018 Games. Although Flaherty was born in the United States mainland, he has resided in Puerto Rico Since 2010, which gave him eligibility to compete for the country. Puerto Rico Olympic Committee’s eligibility requirement is three years of residency on the island.

=== 2018 Winter Olympics ===
Flaherty competed for Puerto Rico at the 2018 Winter Olympics in the alpine skiing events, specifically in the giant slalom. Flaherty became the first athlete to compete for Puerto Rico at a Winter Olympics since 1998, and the first Puerto Rican athlete sent to a Winter Olympic Games since 2002, when the only athletes sent – a bobsled team – did not compete, because one of the team's members was ruled ineligible.

During the opening ceremony on 9 February, he was the flag bearer for Puerto Rico in the Parade of Nations. Flaherty concluded his participation in the giant slalom 73rd (out of 110 participants) with a time of 2:56.05 (the best time was Marcel Hirscher's 2:18.04).

Education

Charles Flaherty finished high school in 2019, then enrolled in Embry-Riddle Aeronautical University in Prescott, Arizona as a full-time student in August 2019. As a student at ERAU, he was an active member of the Rocket Development Lab, a club level rocket building team. On April 16, 2023 a team of 9 students set three world records for amateur and collegiate rocketry when they launched a liquid fueled rocket named Deneb from Friends of Amateur Rocketry in the Mojave Desert of California to over 46,000 feet of altitude. The world records set were for highest amateur liquid rocket flight, highest collegiate liquid rocket flight, and highest undergraduate liquid rocket flight.

After four years of university, one internship at Astranis in San Francisco, two internships at SpaceX in Cape Canaveral, Florida, and one internship at SpaceX in Boca Chica, Texas, Charles graduated from ERAU with a degree in mechanical engineering with a focus in propulsion in December 2023.

In February 2024, Charles accepted a job offer from SpaceX as a flight control engineer in Boca Chica, Texas, now known as Starbase, Texas.

== Olympic results ==
Year
Year	Age	Slalom	Giant; Slalom	Super G	Downhill	Combined
2018	17	—	73	—	—	—

Olympic Games
Preceded by Jaime Espinal	Flagbearer for Puerto Rico; PyeongChang 2018	Succeeded by Brian Afanador; Adriana Díaz
