= Eiras =

Eiras is a surname. Notable people with the surname include:

- Carlos Eiras (1932–2013), Argentine alpine skier
- Carolina Eiras (born 1969), Argentine alpine skier
- Jorge Abelardo Eiras (born 1942), Argentine alpine skier
- Jorge Carlos Eiras (born 1970), Argentine alpine skier
