= Charles Flaherty =

Charles Flaherty may refer to:

- Charles Flaherty (alpine skier) (born 2000), alpine skier for Puerto Rico
- Charles Flaherty (politician) (born 1938), American politician in Massachusetts
