= Otto Mayregger =

Austrian luger (born 1962)

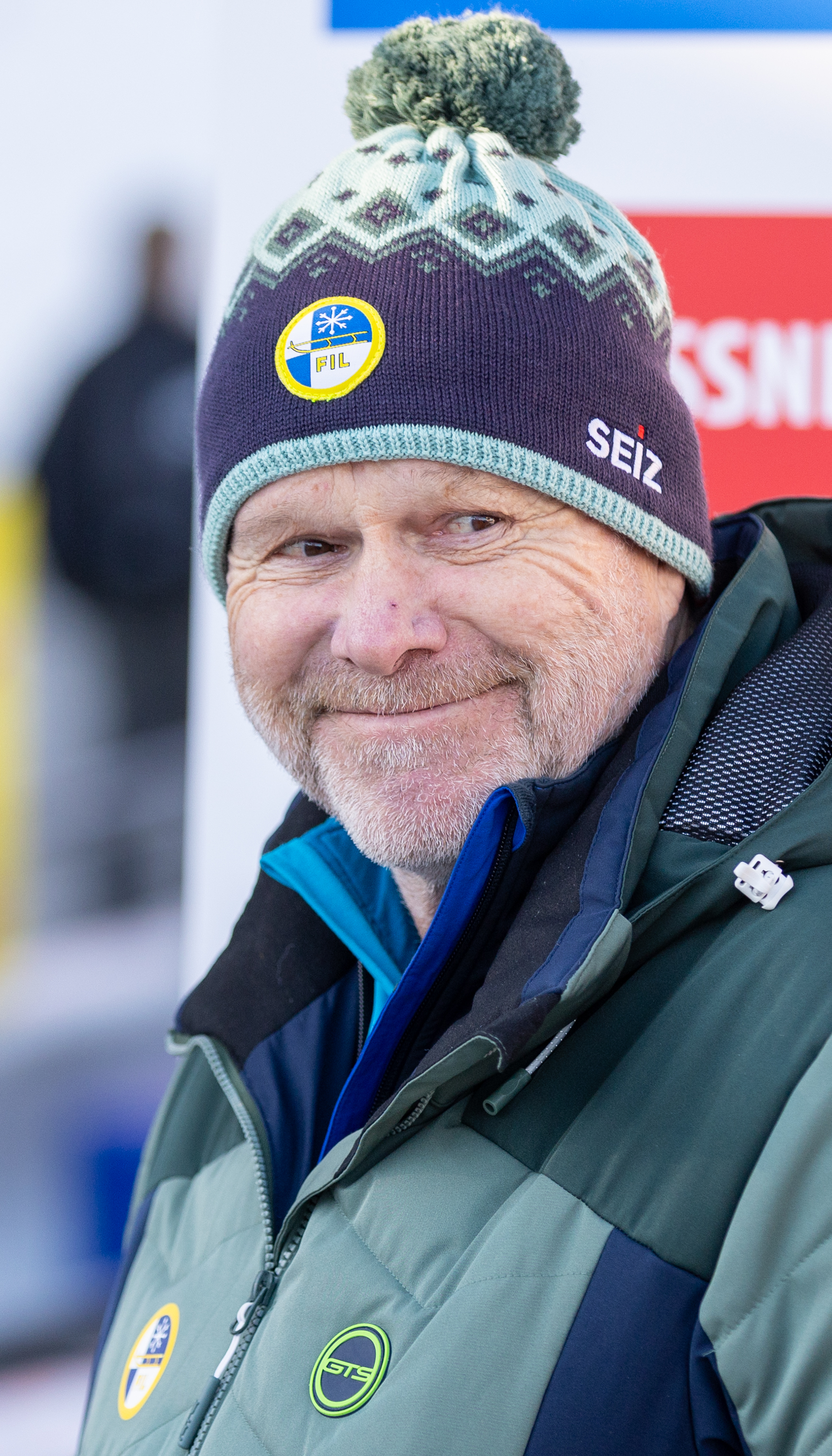
- Mayregger in 2026

Personal information
- Nationality: Austrian
- Born: 3 September 1962 (age 63) Innsbruck, Austria

Sport
- Sport: Luge

Otto Mayregger (born 3 September 1962) is an Austrian luger. He competed in the men's singles event at the 1988 Winter Olympics.
