= Puerto Rico at the 2026 Winter Olympics =

- Flag of Puerto Rico
- IOC code: PUR
- NOC: Puerto Rican Olympic Committee
- Website: copur.pr (in Spanish)

in Milan and Cortina d'Ampezzo, Italy 6 February 2026 – 22 February 2026
- Competitors: 1 (1 woman) in 1 sport
- Flag bearer (opening): Kellie Delka
- Flag bearer (closing): Volunteer
- Medals: Gold 0 Silver 0 Bronze 0 Total 0

Winter Olympics appearances (overview)
- 1984; 1988; 1992; 1994; 1998; 2002; 2006–2014; 2018; 2022; 2026

Puerto Rico competed at the 2026 Winter Olympics in Milan and Cortina d'Ampezzo, Italy, from 6 to 22 February 2026. It was the territory's ninth appearance at the Winter Olympics, since its debut at the 1984 Winter Olympics in Sarajevo. The Puerto Rican delegation consisted of a single athlete, Kellie Delka, competing in a single sport. She did not win any medals at the Games.

== Background ==
The Puerto Rico Olympic Committee was recognized by the International Olympic Committee (IOC) in 1948. Puerto Rico made its first Olympic appearance at the 1948 Summer Olympics in London, and its Winter Olympics debut at the 1984 Winter Olympics in Sarajevo. The 2026 Winter Olympics was the nation's ninth appearance at the Winter Olympics.

The 2026 Winter Olympics was held in Milan and Cortina d'Ampezzo, Italy, from 6 to 22 February 2026. Skeleton racer Kellie Delka was the Puerto Rican flagbearer during the opening ceremony. Meanwhile, a volunteer was the country's flagbearer during the closing ceremony. Puerto Rico did not win a medal at the Games.

== Competitors ==
The Puerto Rican team consists of a single athlete (female) competing in a single sport.

Sport	Men	Women	Total
Skeleton	0	1	1
Total	0	1	1

== Skeleton ==
As per the International Bobsleigh and Skeleton Federation, a total of 50 quota spots (25 per gender) were available for Skeleton event at the games. The qualification was based on the World Ranking list as of 16 January 2022. Athletes were ranked by their best seven results and required to be ranked in the top 60 (men) or top 55 (women) to be eligible to compete at the games. Based on the world rankings, Puerto Rico qualified one sled in the women's event.

Kellie Delka represented the island, and made her second consecutive Olympic appearance after making her debut four years ago in the 2022 Winter Olympics in Beijing. Delka, who is originally from Texas, has lived in Puerto Rico for the last eight years. Delka was a pole vault athlete while at the University of North Texas, and took up skeleton only in 2013, after being introduced to the sport by bobsled racer Johnny Quinn. She competed for the United States till 2017, when she switched her allegiance to Puerto Rico.

The skeleton event was held at the Eugenio Monti Sliding Centre, Cortina d'Ampezzo. Delka, who competed in the women's event, was ranked 24th out of the 25 competitors across her first three runs and last in the fourth and final run. She was ranked 24th overall in the final classification, with a total time of three minutes and 57.31 seconds.

Athlete	Event	Run 1		Run 2		Run 3		Run 4		Total	
Athlete	Event	Time	Rank	Time	Rank	Time	Rank	Time	Rank	Time	Rank
Kellie Delka	Women's	59.40	24	59.17	24	59.52	24	59.22	25	3:57.31	24

== See also ==
- Puerto Rico at the 2026 Winter Paralympics
