= Kuo Koul-hwa =

Taiwanese alpine skier (born 1968)

Personal information
- Nationality: Taiwanese
- Born: 19 November 1968 (age 57)

Sport
- Sport: Alpine skiing

Kuo Koul-hwa (born 19 November 1968) is a Taiwanese alpine skier. He competed in the men's giant slalom at the 1988 Winter Olympics.
