= Nigel Smith (alpine skier) =

British alpine skier (born 1964)

Nigel Smith (born 31 January 1964 in Redhill, Surrey) is a retired British alpine skier who competed in the men's super-G at the 1988 Winter Olympics, finishing 29th.
