= Behudin Merdović =

Serbian speed skater

Personal information
- Nationality: Serbian
- Born: 15 October 1961 (age 63); Priboj, Yugoslavia

Sport
- Sport: Speed skating

Behudin Merdović (born 15 October 1961) is a Serbian speed skater. He competed at the 1984 Winter Olympics and the 1988 Winter Olympics.
