= Luis Viscarra =

Bolivian alpine skier (born 1960)

Personal information
- Born: 23 August 1960 (age 64); La Paz, Bolivia

Sport
- Sport: Alpine skiing

Luis Viscarra (born 23 August 1960) is a Bolivian alpine skier. He competed in the men's slalom at the 1988 Winter Olympics.
