= Puerto Rico at the 2022 Winter Olympics =

- Flag of Puerto Rico
- IOC code: PUR
- NOC: Puerto Rico Olympic Committee
- Website: www.copur.pr (in Spanish)

in Beijing, China 4–20 February 2022
- Competitors: 2 (1 man and 1 woman) in 2 sports
- Flag bearers (opening): Kellie Delka; William Flaherty
- Flag bearer (closing): Kellie Delka
- Medals: Gold 0 Silver 0 Bronze 0 Total 0

Winter Olympics appearances (overview)
- 1984; 1988; 1992; 1994; 1998; 2002; 2006–2014; 2018; 2022; 2026

Puerto Rico competed at the 2022 Winter Olympics in Beijing, China, from 4 to 20 February 2022. It was the territory's eighth appearance at the Winter Olympics, since its debut at the 1984 Winter Olympics in Sarajevo. The Puerto Rican delegation consisted of two athletes competing in two sports. It did not win any medals at the Games.

== Background ==
The Puerto Rico Olympic Committee was recognized by the International Olympic Committee (IOC) in 1948. Puerto Rico made its first Olympic appearance at the 1948 Summer Olympics in London, and its Winter Olympics debut at the 1984 Winter Olympics in Sarajevo. The 2022 Winter Olympics was the nation's eighth appearance at the Winter Olympics.

The 2022 Winter Olympics was held in Beijing, China, between 4 and 22 February 2022. Skeleton racer Kellie Delka and alpine skier William Flaherty were named as the Puerto Rican flagbearers during the opening ceremony. Meanwhile, Delka was the flagbearer during the closing ceremony. Puerto Rico did not win a medal at the Games.

== Competitors ==
The Puerto Rican team consists of two athletes (one male and one female) competing in two sports.

Sport	Men	Women	Total
Alpine skiing	1	0	1
Skeleton	0	1	1
Total	1	1	2

== Alpine skiing ==
The basic qualification mark for the slalom and giant slalom events stipulated an average of less than 160 points in the list published by the International Ski Federation (FIS) as on 17 January 2022. The quotas were allocated further based on athletes satisfying other criteria with a maximum of 22 athletes (11 male and 11 female athletes) from a single participating NOC. Puerto Rican alpine skier William Flaherty met the basic qualification standard with 153.84 points in the slalom and 134.15 points in the giant slalom categories. Subject to the other criteria, William Flaherty qualified to participate in both the events at the games. William Flaherty was born in Cincinnati, and is the brother of Charles Flaherty, who represented Puerto Rico in the 2018 Winter Olympics.

In the giant slalom event held on 13 February 2022 at the Yanqing National Alpine Skiing Centre, Flaherty completed his first run in 1:20.16 to rank 48th amongst the 87 competitors. Though he took slightly longer to complete the course during his second run at 1:21.26, he ranked 38th in the classification. With a combined time of 2:41.42, he finished 40th in the overall classification. In the slalom event held on 16 February 2022, Flaherty completed his first run in 1:09.86 and was ranked 51st. Though he improved to 1:02.57 in the second run to be ranked 42nd, he eventually finished 44th amongst the 87 competitors.

Men

Athlete	Event	Run 1		Run 2		Total	
Athlete	Event	Time	Rank	Time	Rank	Time	Rank
William Flaherty	Men's giant slalom	1:20.16	48	1:21.26	38	2:41.42	40
William Flaherty	Men's slalom	1:09.86	51	1:02.57	42	2:12.43	44

== Skeleton ==
As per the International Bobsleigh and Skeleton Federation, a total of 50 quota spots (25 per gender) were available for Skeleton event at the games. The qualification was based on the World Ranking list as of 16 January 2022. Athletes were ranked by their best seven results and required to be ranked in the top 60 (men) or top 55 (women) to be eligible to compete at the games. Based on the world rankings, Puerto Rico qualified one sled in the women's event. This marked the country's debut in the sport at the Winter Olympics.

The skeleton event was held at the Yanqing National Alpine Skiing Centre. Kellie Delka, who competed in the women's event, was ranked 24th out of the 25 competitors across her three runs and in the final classification. Hence, she did not make it to the final run ahead of the medal classification.

Athlete	Event	Run 1		Run 2		Run 3		Run 4		Total	
Athlete	Event	Time	Rank	Time	Rank	Time	Rank	Time	Rank	Time	Rank
Kellie Delka	Women's	1:04.83	24	1:04.47	24	1:04.55	24	Did not advance		3:13.85	24

== See also ==
- Tropical nations at the Winter Olympics
