= Max Burghardtswieser =

German luger (born 1967)

Personal information
- Nationality: German
- Born: 5 April 1967 (age 59) Berchtesgaden, West Germany

Sport
- Sport: Luge

Max Burghardtswieser (born 5 April 1967) is a German luger. He competed in the men's singles event at the 1988 Winter Olympics.
