= Toru Ito =

Japanese luger (born 1966)

Personal information
- Nationality: Japanese
- Born: 8 April 1966 (age 58); Hokkaido, Japan

Sport
- Sport: Luge

Toru Ito (born 8 April 1966) is a Japanese luger. He competed in the men's singles event at the 1988 Winter Olympics.
