= Jaime Bascon =

Bolivian alpine skier (born 1963)

Personal information
- Nationality: Bolivian
- Born: 31 December 1963 (age 61)

Sport
- Sport: Alpine skiing

Jaime Bascon (born 31 December 1963) is a Bolivian alpine skier. He competed in the men's giant slalom at the 1988 Winter Olympics.
