= Macleod Nicol =

British luger (born 1958)

Personal information
- Nationality: British
- Born: 18 October 1958 (age 68) London, England

Sport
- Sport: Luge

MacLeod Nicol (born 18 October 1958) is a British luger. He competed in the men's singles event at the 1988 Winter Olympics. In 1991 he emigrated to Canada and worked there as an airline pilot until retirement. Since then he works as a simulator instructor on the Boeing 737 Max and NG.
