= Alex Williams (alpine skier) =

American alpine skier (born 1963)

Alex Williams (born October 25, 1963, in Rochester, New York) is an American former alpine skier who competed in the men's slalom at the 1988 Winter Olympics.
