= Nil Labrecque =

Canadian luger (born 1965)

Personal information
- Born: 20 July 1965 (age 60) Sherbrooke, Quebec, Canada

Sport
- Sport: Luge

Nil Labrecque (born 20 July 1965) is a Canadian luger. He competed in the men's singles event at the 1988 Winter Olympics.
