= Peter Beck (luger) =

Liechtenstein luger (born 1965)

Personal information
- Nationality: Liechtenstein
- Born: 9 July 1965 (age 61)

Sport
- Sport: Luge

Peter Beck (born 9 July 1965) is a Liechtensteiner luger. He competed in the men's singles event at the 1988 Winter Olympics.
