= Guatemala at the 1988 Winter Olympics =

- IOC code: GUA
- NOC: Guatemalan Olympic Committee
- Website: www.cog.org.gt (in Spanish)

in Calgary
- Competitors: 6 (5 men, 1 woman) in 2 sports
- Flag bearer: Alfredo Rego
- Medals: Gold 0 Silver 0 Bronze 0 Total 0

Winter Olympics appearances (overview)
- 1988; 1992–2026

Guatemala competed in the Winter Olympic Games for the first time (and as of 2026, only time) at the 1988 Winter Olympics in Calgary, Alberta, Canada.

== Competitors ==
The following is the list of number of competitors in the Games.

Sport	Men	Women	Total
Alpine skiing	3	1	4
Cross-country skiing	2	0	2
Total	5	1	6

== Alpine skiing ==
Men

Athlete	Event	Race 1	Race 2	Total	
Athlete	Event	Time	Time	Time	Rank
Carlos Andrés Bruderer	Super-G			DNF	–
Christian Bruderer	Super-G			2:05.99	50
Christian Bruderer	Giant Slalom	DNF	–	DNF	–
Alfredo Rego	Giant Slalom	1:45.07	1:41.52	3:26.59	69
Carlos Andrés Bruderer	Giant Slalom	1:29.45	1:26.17	2:55.62	65
Alfredo Rego	Slalom	1:46.49	1:33.79	3:20.28	54
Christian Bruderer	Slalom	1:19.30	DNF	DNF	–
Carlos Andrés Bruderer	Slalom	1:16.87	1:09.43	2:26.30	39

Women

Athlete	Event	Race 1	Race 2	Total	
Athlete	Event	Time	Time	Time	Rank
Fiamma Smith	Super-G			DNF	–
Fiamma Smith	Giant Slalom	1:25.31	1:34.86	3:00.17	29
Fiamma Smith	Slalom	1:23.56	1:21.94	2:45.50	27

== Cross-country skiing ==
Men

Event	Athlete	Race	
Event	Athlete	Time	Rank
15 km C	Ricardo Burgos	55:16.3	81
15 km C	Dag Burgos	53:00.8	80
30 km C	Ricardo Burgos	1'51:19.4	83
30 km C	Dag Burgos	1'47:38.5	80

C = Classical style, F = Freestyle
