= William Schenker =

Puerto Rican alpine skier (born 1958)

Personal information
- Born: 14 February 1958 (age 67); Brooklyn, New York City, U.S.

Sport
- Sport: Alpine skiing

William Schenker (born 14 February 1958) is an alpine skier and auto racer. He competed in the men's slalom at the 1998 Winter Olympics, representing Puerto Rico.
