= Puerto Rico at the 2002 Winter Olympics =

- IOC code: PUR
- NOC: Puerto Rico Olympic Committee
- Website: www.copur.pr (in Spanish)

in Salt Lake City, Utah
- Competitors: 2 (men) in 1 sport
- Flag bearer: Manuel Repollet
- Medals: Gold 0 Silver 0 Bronze 0 Total 0

Winter Olympics appearances (overview)
- 1984; 1988; 1992; 1994; 1998; 2002; 2006–2014; 2018; 2022; 2026

Puerto Rico was represented at the 2002 Winter Olympics in Salt Lake City, Utah, United States by the Puerto Rico Olympic Committee.

In total, two athletes – both men – were due to represent Puerto Rico in the bobsleigh events. However, the team did not start after it was discovered one of the athletes, Michael Gonzales, was ineligible to represent Puerto Rico.

The 2002 Winter Olympics would be Puerto Rico's last appearance at the Winter Olympics for 16 years after the Puerto Rico Olympic Committee withdrew the recognition of the Winter Sports Federation.

== Competitors ==
In total, two athletes represented Puerto Rico at the 2002 Winter Olympics in Salt Lake City, Utah, United States across one sport.

Sport	Men	Women	Total
Bobsleigh	2	0	2
Total	2	0	2

== Bobsleigh ==
In total, two Puerto Rican athletes were due to participate in the bobsleigh events – Michael Gonzales and Manuel Repollet in the two-man bob. However, Gonzales was found not to meet Puerto Rico Olympic Committee's eligibility criteria as he had not been resident in Puerto Rico for at least five years. As a result, Puerto Rico withdrew from the event and were listed as did not start.

Sled	Athletes	Event	Run 1		Run 2		Run 3		Run 4		Total	
Sled	Athletes	Event	Time	Rank	Time	Rank	Time	Rank	Time	Rank	Time	Rank
PUR-1	Michael Gonzales; Manuel Repollet	Two-man	DNS	–	–	–	–	–	–	–	DNS	–

== Aftermath ==
Despite the controversy surrounding the withdrawal of the bobsleigh team, Puerto Rico Olympic Committee president Héctor Cardona felt the island should continue to compete in the Winter Olympics.

However, the Puerto Rico Olympic Committee subsequently withdrew the recognition of the Winter Sports Federation for the island which ended their participation at the Winter Olympics for over a decade. The break came to an end ahead of the 2018 Winter Olympics in Pyeongchang, South Korea.
