= Puerto Rico at the 1984 Winter Olympics =

- IOC code: PUR
- NOC: Puerto Rico Olympic Committee
- Website: www.copur.pr (in Spanish)

in Sarajevo
- Competitors: 1 (man) in 1 sport
- Flag bearer: George Tucker (luge)
- Medals: Gold 0 Silver 0 Bronze 0 Total 0

Winter Olympics appearances (overview)
- 1984; 1988; 1992; 1994; 1998; 2002; 2006–2014; 2018; 2022; 2026

Puerto Rico competed at the 1984 Winter Olympics held in Sarajevo, Yugoslavia, between 8 and 19 February 1984. It was the territory's debut appearance at the Winter Olympics. The Puerto Rican delegation consisted of a single athlete, George Tucker. Puerto Rico did not win any medals at the Games.

== Background ==
The Puerto Rico Olympic Committee was recognized by the International Olympic Committee (IOC) in 1948. Though Puerto Rico made its first Summer Olympic appearance at the 1948 Summer Olympics in London, and its Winter Olympics debut came only at the 1984 Winter Olympics in Sarajevo.

The 1984 Winter Olympics was held in Sarajevo, Yugoslavia, between 8 and 19 February 1984. Luge athlete George Tucker was the Puerto Rican flagbearer during the opening ceremony. Puerto Rico did not win a medal at the Games.

== Competitors ==
Puerto Rica was represented by a single athlete, George Tucker.

Sport	Men	Women	Total
Luge	1	0	1
Total	1	0	1

== Luge ==
Puerto Rico qualified one athlete for the men's singles luge event at the 1984 Winter Olympics, George Tucker. Tucker was the first Winter Olympic participant from Puerto Rico. His appearance in Sarajevo marked the first participation by a Caribbean athlete at the Winter Olympics. Tucker is a physicist, and was a doctoral student at Wesleyan University at the time of the Games.

The luge events were held at Trebević. The 1.21 km (0.75 mi)-long course had 13 curves, and a vertical drop of 129 m (423 ft) from the starting altitude of 1,112 m (3,648 ft). In the event, Tucker was ranked penultimate out of the 32 participants in each of his first three runs. In the fourth run, he improved one position to 30th. Tucker eventually finished 30th and last of the classified athletes with a combined time of 3:33.013.

Athlete	Event	Run 1		Run 2		Run 3		Run 4		Total	
Athlete	Event	Time	Rank	Time	Rank	Time	Rank	Time	Rank	Time	Rank
George Tucker	Men's singles	53.962	31	52.907	31	53.271	31	52.873	30	3:33.013	30
