= Helmut Mayer =

Austrian alpine skier (born 1966)

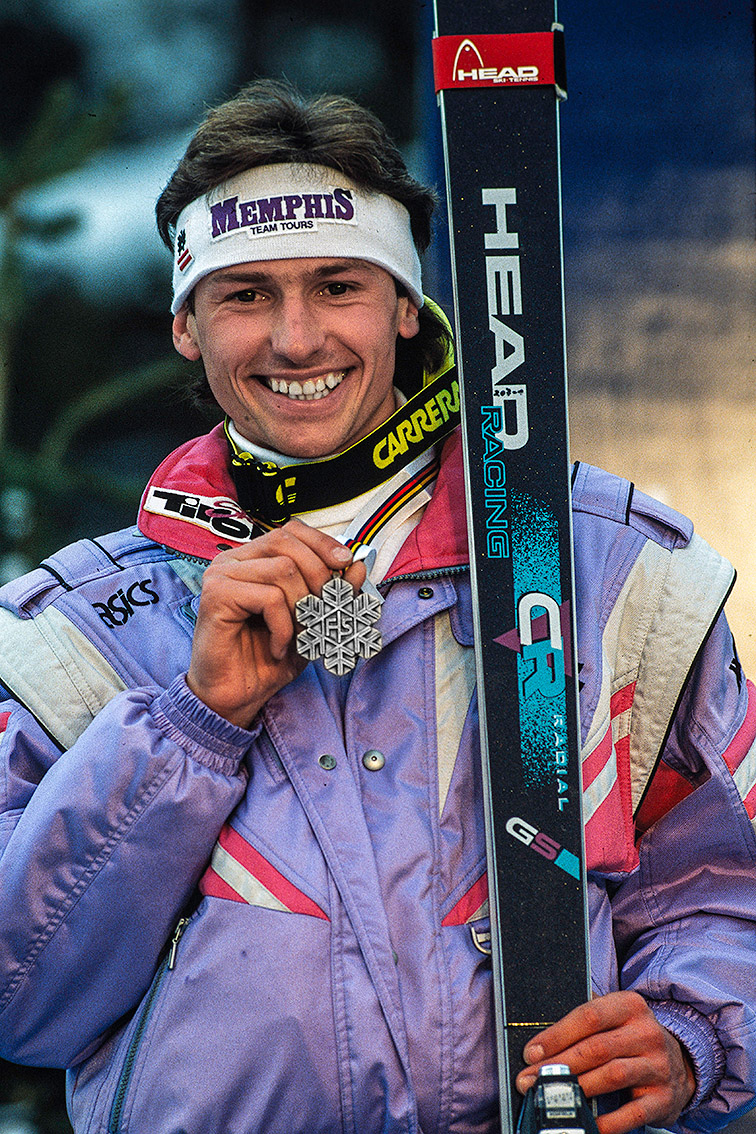
- Mayer with the silver medal at the FIS Alpine World Ski Championships 1989

Medal record

Men's alpine skiing

Representing Austria

Olympic Games
Silver medal – second place	1988 Calgary	Super-G

World Championships
Silver medal – second place	1989 Vail	Giant slalom

Helmut Mayer (born 4 March 1966 in Verditz) is a former World Cup alpine ski racer from Austria. At the 1988 Winter Olympics in Calgary he won a silver medal in the Super-G competition at Nakiska. He also won a silver medal in the giant slalom at the World Championships in 1989 at Vail, Colorado.

Mayer is the father of World Cup racer Matthias Mayer, the Olympic gold medalist in downhill in 2014, and Super-G in 2018 and 2022.

== World Cup victories ==
Season	Date	Location	Discipline
1988	19 Dec 1987	(Socialist Federal Republic of Yugoslavia) Kranjska Gora, Yugoslavia	Giant slalom
