= Puerto Rico at the 2018 Winter Olympics =

- Flag of Puerto Rico
- IOC code: PUR
- NOC: Puerto Rico Olympic Committee
- Website: www.copur.pr (in Spanish)

in Pyeongchang, South Korea February 9–25, 2018
- Competitors: 1 in 1 sport
- Flag bearer: Charles Flaherty
- Medals: Gold 0 Silver 0 Bronze 0 Total 0

Winter Olympics appearances (overview)
- 1984; 1988; 1992; 1994; 1998; 2002; 2006–2014; 2018; 2022; 2026

Puerto Rico competed at the 2018 Winter Olympics in Pyeongchang, South Korea, from 9 to 25 February 2018. This marked the return of the territory to the Winter Olympics for the first time since 2002. It was represented by only one athlete, alpine skier Charles Flaherty.

== Background ==
In 2002, the bobsleigh team that was set to compete for the team was withdrawn as one athlete (Michael Gonzales) did not meet Puerto Rico Olympic Committee rules about eligibility. After this, the Puerto Rico Olympic Committee withdrew the recognition of the Winter Sports Federation for the island territory, effectively ending any hopes for athletes competing at the Winter Olympics. Alpine skier Kristina Krone qualified to represent the territory at both the 2010 and 2014 Winter Olympics in Vancouver and Sochi respectively. However, both times the Puerto Rico Olympic Committee refused to even acknowledge her qualification and the territory did not compete. In December 2017, the Puerto Rico Olympic Committee allowed a six-month temporary membership to the Winter Sports Federation, thus allowing the territory to compete at the 2018 Games. Although Charles Flaherty was born in the mainland United States, he has resided in Puerto Rico for several years, which gave him eligibility to compete for the territory. (Charles Flaherty's brother William Flaherty later represented Puerto Rico at the 2022 Winter Olympics.)

== Competitors ==
The following is the list of number of competitors participating in the Puerto Rican delegation per sport.

Sport	Men	Women	Total
Alpine skiing	1	0	1
Total	1	0	1

== Alpine skiing ==
Puerto Rico qualified one male athlete, Charles Flaherty.

Athlete	Event	Run 1		Run 2		Total	
Athlete	Event	Time	Rank	Time	Rank	Time	Rank
Charles Flaherty	Men's giant slalom	1:28.50	83	1:27.55	73	2:56.05	73

== See also ==
- Puerto Rico at the 2018 Summer Youth Olympics
