= George Tucker (luger) =

Luger and physicist

George Franklin Tucker (born December 15, 1947, in San Juan, Puerto Rico) is a Puerto Rican physicist and former Olympic luger.

He represented Puerto Rico in the luge event at the 1984 Winter Olympics in Sarajevo, and was the only Puerto Rican representative at the Games. He was also the country's flagbearer. Tucker was, at the time, a doctoral student at Wesleyan University in the United States. He was later described by Sports Illustrated as "overweight but quick-witted" and as "the press's favorite loser". He finished last in his event, and reportedly "got a lot more press in the States than Paul Hildgartner, the Italian who won the gold medal". He described himself as "the luger who dripped blood", and Time reported that he "shed alarming amounts of skin bouncing off the wall".

Tucker represented Puerto Rico again at the 1988 Winter Olympics in Calgary, but was, this time, one of nine Puerto Rican competitors. Tucker competed in the luge with teammate Raúl Muñiz. This time, he did not finish last.

According to Puerto Rican bobsled coach Rich Kolko, Tucker in 1984 "set the standard for Caribbean nations competing" in Winter sports – such as the Jamaican bobsled team.
