= Luis González (skier) =

Puerto Rican freestyle skier

Personal information
- Nationality: Puerto Rican
- Born: 18 January 1955 (age 70)

Sport
- Sport: Freestyle skiing

Luis González (born 18 January 1955) is a Puerto Rican freestyle skier. He competed in the men's moguls event at the 1992 Winter Olympics.
