= Jorge Carlos Eiras =

Argentine alpine skier (born 1970)

Personal information
- Nationality: Argentine
- Born: 25 May 1970 (age 54)

Sport
- Sport: Alpine skiing

Jorge Carlos Eiras (born 25 May 1970) is an Argentine alpine skier. He competed in the men's slalom at the 1988 Winter Olympics.
