= Peter Bosinger =

Canadian alpine skier and coach (born 1965)

Peter Bosinger (born 14 April 1965 in Montreal, Quebec) is a Canadian former alpine skier and current coach.

Born in Montreal, Bosinger and his family, including brother and fellow skier Robert Bosinger moved to Rossland at a young age where they skied for the Red Mountain Racers. After 10 years they moved to Banff, and were quickly selected for the Alberta ski team. Bosinger competed in the 1988 Winter Olympics in the Giant Slalom but was disqualified.

Following his retirement from competition Bosinger worked from 1993 to 2002 as an alpine skiing coach, latterly as the men's head speed coach, including coaching alpine skiers at the 2002 Winter Olympics.

From 2003 Bosinger worked as a coach with the speed group of the U.S. Ski Team, including Bode Miller and Daron Rahlves. He was the sport manager of alpine skiing for the Vancouver Organizing Committee (VANOC) at the 2010 Winter Olympic Games. He worked as coach with the Canadian men's technical team from 2010 and then in April 2012 was appointed Head coach for the World Cup men's program.
