= Gerald Näscher =

Liechtenstein alpine skier (born 1965)

Gerald Näscher (born 12 September 1965) is a Liechtensteiner former alpine skier who competed in the 1988 Winter Olympics.
