= Jaime Frontera =

Puerto Rican basketball player

Jaime Frontera (born 30 November 1940 in Mayagüez, Puerto Rico) is a Puerto Rican former basketball player who competed in the 1964 Summer Olympics and in the 1968 Summer Olympics. He was the flag bearer for Puerto Rico in the 1968 Summer Olympics. He was one of the torch lighters of the 2010 Central American and Caribbean Games. He is a member of Phi Sigma Alpha fraternity.
