= Pablo García (luger) =

Spanish luger (born 1967)

Personal information
- Nationality: Spanish
- Born: 16 September 1967 (age 57)

Sport
- Sport: Luge

Pablo García (born 16 September 1967) is a Spanish luger. He competed at the 1988 Winter Olympics and the 1992 Winter Olympics.
