= Mikael Holm =

Swedish luger (born 1968)

Personal information
- Nationality: Swedish
- Born: 8 October 1968 (age 58) Stockholm, Sweden

Sport
- Sport: Luge

Mikael Holm (born 8 October 1968) is a Swedish luger. He competed at the 1988, 1992, 1994 and the 1998 Winter Olympics.
