= Mike Gonzales =

American decathlete (born 1962)

Michael Gonzales
Personal information
- Nickname: Mike
- National team: United States (Decathlon), Puerto Rico (Bobsleigh 1998)
- Born: July 7, 1962 U.S.
- Education: University of Southern California (BS in Communications)
- Occupation(s): CEO for TOPIMR (web-based Internet Marketing Company), Professional golfer (since 2016)
- Spouse: Debra

Sport
- Country: United States (Decathlon, Bobsleigh 1998)
- Sport: Decathlon (Track and Field), Bobsleigh, Golf
- Event(s): Decathlon, Four-man bobsled, Golf
- College team: University of Southern California

Achievements and titles
- Personal best: Decathlon 8,203 points (1988)
Medal record
men's track and field
Gold medal – first place	1987 Pan American Games	Decathlon
Gold medal – first place	United States Olympic Festival	1987 Decathlon

Michael Gonzales is a former United States decathlete.

Gonzales attended Bishop Montgomery High School in Redondo Beach, California, where he played both football and track and field. He was inducted into the school's Athletic Hall of Fame in 2013.

Gonzales was offered multiple football scholarships to play at top universities. He accepted a full scholarship in Track and Field from University of Southern California with the intention of becoming an Olympic athlete. At USC Gonzales was a standout in decathlon, where he held the USC Decathlon School record from 1984-2019. He competed and won the gold medal in decathlon at the 1987 Pan American Games in Indiana.

Gonzales tried four times to make the USA Olympic Team in Decathlon (1984 1988, 1992,1996) but was plagued by injury in each attempt. Gonzales was recruited by Olympian Liston Bochette to participate in the 1998 Winter Olympics representing Puerto Rico in the four-man bobsled team. At 2002 Winter Olympics Michael Gonzales did not meet Puerto Rico Olympic Committee rules about eligibility; after this, the Puerto Rico Olympic Committee withdrew the recognition of the Winter Sports Federation for the island, effectively ending any hopes for athletes competing at the Winter Olympics until 2018.

Gonzales later became a competitive amateur golfer, competing in over 400 tournaments. In 2016 Mike Gonzales began to complete as a professional golfer, completing in Champion Tour Event qualifiers and 3 of the Champion Tour Qualifying School Tournaments. Today he is the CEO for TOPIMR, a web-based Internet Marketing Company.

== Honors and awards ==
- 2014 USC Track and Field Hall of Fame; Heritage Award recipient
- 2013 Bishop Montgomery High School, Athletic Hall of Fame
- 1988 Personal Record Decathlon 8,203 points
- 1987 Gold Medalist, Pan American Games Decathlon
- 1987 United States Olympics Festival Decathlon Gold Medalist
- 1984 USC All-American, Decathlon
- 1984 USC Track and Field Record, Decathlon (8,022), Held Record 1984-2019
- 1983,1984, 1985 3 Time All-Pac-10 Decathlon
- 1980 United States Junior Olympics National Decathlon
- 1980 United States National Age Group Decathlon Record 16 years and under

== Education ==
- Bishop Montgomery High School, Torrance CA (1982)
- University of Southern California, BS in Communications(full scholarship, track and field)

== Personal life ==
Gonzales resides in Southern California with his wife.
