= Joseph Keosseian =

Puerto Rican bobsledder

Personal information
- Nationality: Puerto Rican
- Born: 11 January 1964 (age 61)

Sport
- Sport: Bobsleigh

Joseph Keosseian (born 11 January 1964) is a Puerto Rican bobsledder. He competed in the two man and the four man events at the 1998 Winter Olympics.
