= Douglas Rosado =

Puerto Rican bobsledder

Personal information
- Nationality: Puerto Rican
- Born: 22 September 1964 (age 61) New York, NY

Sport
- Sport: Track & Field (1982-1988) Bobsleigh (1990-1994)

Douglas Rosado (born 22 September 1964), in New York, NY was a Track and Field athlete, twice Bobsleigh Olympic athlete (1992 & 1994); He competed at the 1992 Winter Olympics and the 1994 Winter Olympics. He also served in the United States Navy as a Naval aviator and attorney.

Recruited on Track and Field scholarship, Rosado attended and graduated with a Bachelors in Science from Interamerican University of Puerto Rico. He also studied at University of Houston University where he competed in the 110-meter-High Hurdles and the Decathlon. In 1999, he received his Juris Doctor from Interamerican University of Puerto Rico School of Law.

As an athlete, he competed internationally in the bobsled, decathlon and 110 meters high hurdles while representing Puerto Rico. Was member of the two-mem bobsled team at the 1992 Winter Olympic Game at Albertville, France and in the four-man bobsled in the 1994 Winter Olympic Game at Lillehammer, Norway. Rosado was twice Puerto Rico National Champion for the 110 meters High Hurdle for Puerto Rico (1984 & 1985). Twice Conference Decathlon Champion (1983 & 1987). Decathlon Bronze medal at the Caribbean and Centro American Championships, Cuba (1983). 110 HH Silver medalist & team captain at the Americas Cup Championships, San Juan, PR (1985). At 46 Douglas started dabbling again in Track & Field into the master athletics age group. Won Gold Medal 110 meters HH, Pentathlon, 4x100 and 4x 400 relays at the 2010 World Master Athletics (WMA) North, Central American and Caribbean Championships held in Mayaguez, Puerto Rico, (M45-49). Won Silver medal at the 2011 WMA World Track & Field Championship at Sacramento, CA (M45-49).

As a professional, Rosado was a Naval Officer while serving in the U.S. Navy from 1988 until his retirement in 2016 attaining the rank of Commander. He served as a Carrier Jet Naval Flight Office (NFO) while flying the S-3B “Viking”, with operational base on board the USS Theodore Roosevelt (CVN-71). Commander Rosado also served as an attorney and senior Naval Officer during multiple assignments.
