= Greg Grossmann =

Canadian alpine skier (born 1966)

Greg Grossmann (born 5 July 1966) is a Canadian former alpine skier from Hamilton, Ontario. He competed in the 1988 Winter Olympics.
