= Chen Tong-jong =

Taiwanese alpine skier (born 1969)

Personal information
- Nationality: Taiwanese
- Born: 23 November 1969 (age 56)

Sport
- Sport: Alpine skiing

Chen Tong-jong (born 23 November 1969) is a Taiwanese alpine skier. He competed at the 1988 Winter Olympics and the 1992 Winter Olympics.
