= Frank Wörndl =

German alpine skier (born 1959)

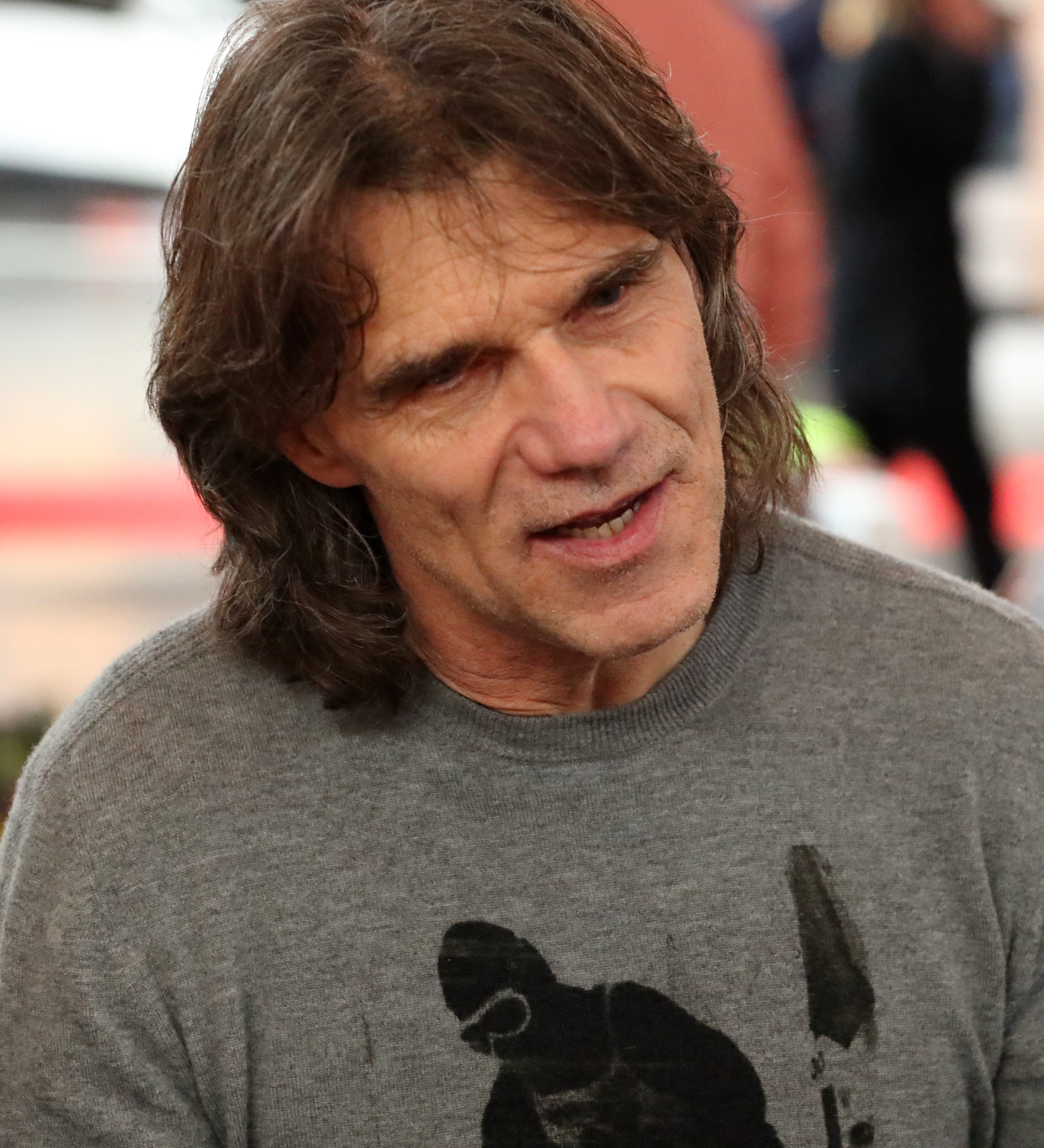
- Frank Wörndl in 2018

Personal information
- Born: 28 June 1959 (age 67) Sonthofen, Bavaria, West Germany
- Height: 1.76 m (5 ft 9 in)
- Weight: 77 kg (170 lb)

Sport
- Sport: Alpine skiing
- Club: Oberstdorf; Sonthofen
Medal record
Representing West Germany
Olympic Games
Silver medal – second place	1988 Calgary	Slalom
World Championships
Gold medal – first place	1987 Crans-Montana	Slalom

Frank Wörndl (born 28 June 1959) is a retired German Alpine skier. A four-time national slalom champion, Wörndl never won a World Cup race, and had mediocre results at the 1980 Olympics, finishing 10th in the slalom and 17th in the giant slalom. Yet he became one of the most successful German alpine skiers in history after winning the world slalom title in 1987 and an Olympic silver medal in 1988. He retired the same year and worked as a TV commentator for ZDF and Eurosport. In 2007 he opened a fitness studio in Sonthofen, and since 2011 he also performs as a singer.
