= Jorge Torruellas =

Puerto Rican alpine skier (born 1952)

Personal information
- Nationality: Puerto Rican
- Born: 3 February 1952 (age 73)

Sport
- Sport: Alpine skiing

Jorge Torruellas (born 3 February 1952) is a Puerto Rican alpine skier. He competed in the men's slalom at the 1988 Winter Olympics. He also competed in the men's moguls in the 1992 Winter Olympics.
