= Mary Pat Wilson =

Puerto Rican alpine skier (born 1963)

Personal information
- Nationality: Puerto Rican
- Born: 12 September 1963 (age 62) Middleburg, Virginia, United States

Sport
- Sport: Alpine skiing

Mary Pat Wilson (born 12 September 1963) is a Puerto Rican alpine skier. She competed in two events at the 1988 Winter Olympics. Wilson was the flag bearer for Puerto Rico in the 1988 opening ceremony.
