= Raúl Muñiz =

Puerto Rican luger

Personal information
- Nationality: Puerto Rican
- Born: 2 August 1956 (age 68)

Sport
- Sport: Luge

Raúl Muñiz (born 2 August 1956) is a Puerto Rican luger. He competed in the men's singles event at the 1988 Winter Olympics.
