= Toñín Casillas =

Puerto Rican Olympic basketball player

Personal information
- Nationality: Puerto Rican
- Born: 8 August 1935 (age 89); Humacao, Puerto Rico

Sport
- Sport: Basketball

José Antonio "Toñín" Casillas Fernández (born 8 August 1935) in Humacao, Puerto Rico is a Puerto Rican former basketball player who competed in the 1960 Summer Olympics.
