= Delfín Campo =

Spanish alpine skier (1966–1997)

Delfin Campo (27 October 1966 – 1997) was a Spanish alpine skier who competed in the 1988 Winter Olympics.
