= John Amabile (bobsleigh) =

Puerto Rican bobsledder (born 1962)

Personal information
- Nationality: Puerto Rican
- Born: 23 April 1962 (age 64) Jersey City, New Jersey, United States

Sport
- Sport: Bobsleigh

John Amabile (born 23 April 1962) is a Puerto Rican bobsledder. He competed at the 1992, 1994 and the 1998 Winter Olympics. In January 2002, he was sent to jail for seven years, after being found guilty of health insurance fraud.
