= Walter Sandza =

Puerto Rican alpine skier (born 1956)

Personal information
- Nationality: Puerto Rican
- Born: 9 August 1956 (age 68)

Sport
- Sport: Alpine skiing

Walter Sandza (born 9 August 1956) is a Puerto Rican alpine skier. He competed in two events at the 1988 Winter Olympics.
