= Kang Nak-youn =

South Korean alpine skier (born 1967)

Personal information
- Nationality: South Korean
- Born: 21 September 1967 (age 59)

Sport
- Sport: Alpine skiing

Kang Nak-youn (born 21 September 1967) is a South Korean alpine skier. He competed in three events at the 1988 Winter Olympics.
