= Richard Biggins =

Australian alpine skier (born 1967)

Personal information
- Nationality: Australian
- Born: 9 September 1967 (age 57); Melbourne, Australia

Sport
- Sport: Alpine skiing

Richard Biggins (born 9 September 1967) is an Australian alpine skier. He competed in three events at the 1988 Winter Olympics.
