= Nam Won-gi =

South Korean alpine skier (born 1963)

Personal information
- Nationality: South Korean
- Born: 11 January 1963 (age 63)

Sport
- Sport: Alpine skiing

Nam Won-gi (born 11 January 1963) is a South Korean alpine skier. He competed in three events at the 1988 Winter Olympics.
