= Félix Flechas =

Puerto Rican alpine skier (born 1954)

Personal information
- Nationality: Puerto Rican
- Born: 17 September 1954 (age 70)

Sport
- Sport: Alpine skiing

Félix Flechas (born 17 September 1954) is a Puerto Rican alpine skier. He competed in two events at the 1988 Winter Olympics.
