= José Ferrer (bobsleigh) =

Puerto Rican bobsledder (born 1965)

Personal information
- Nationality: Puerto Rican
- Born: 28 September 1965 (age 61) San Juan, Puerto Rico

Sport
- Sport: Bobsleigh

José Ferrer (born 28 September 1965) is a Puerto Rican bobsledder. He competed at the 1994 Winter Olympics and the 1998 Winter Olympics. Ferrer was the flag bearer for Puerto Rico in the 1998 opening ceremony.
