= Ioannis Kapraras =

Greek alpine skier (born 1968)

Personal information
- Nationality: Greek
- Born: 13 February 1968 (age 57); Veria, Greece

Sport
- Sport: Alpine skiing

Ioannis Kapraras (born 13 February 1968) is a Greek alpine skier. He competed at the 1988 Winter Olympics and the 1992 Winter Olympics.
