= Klemen Bergant =

Slovenian alpine skier (born 1966)

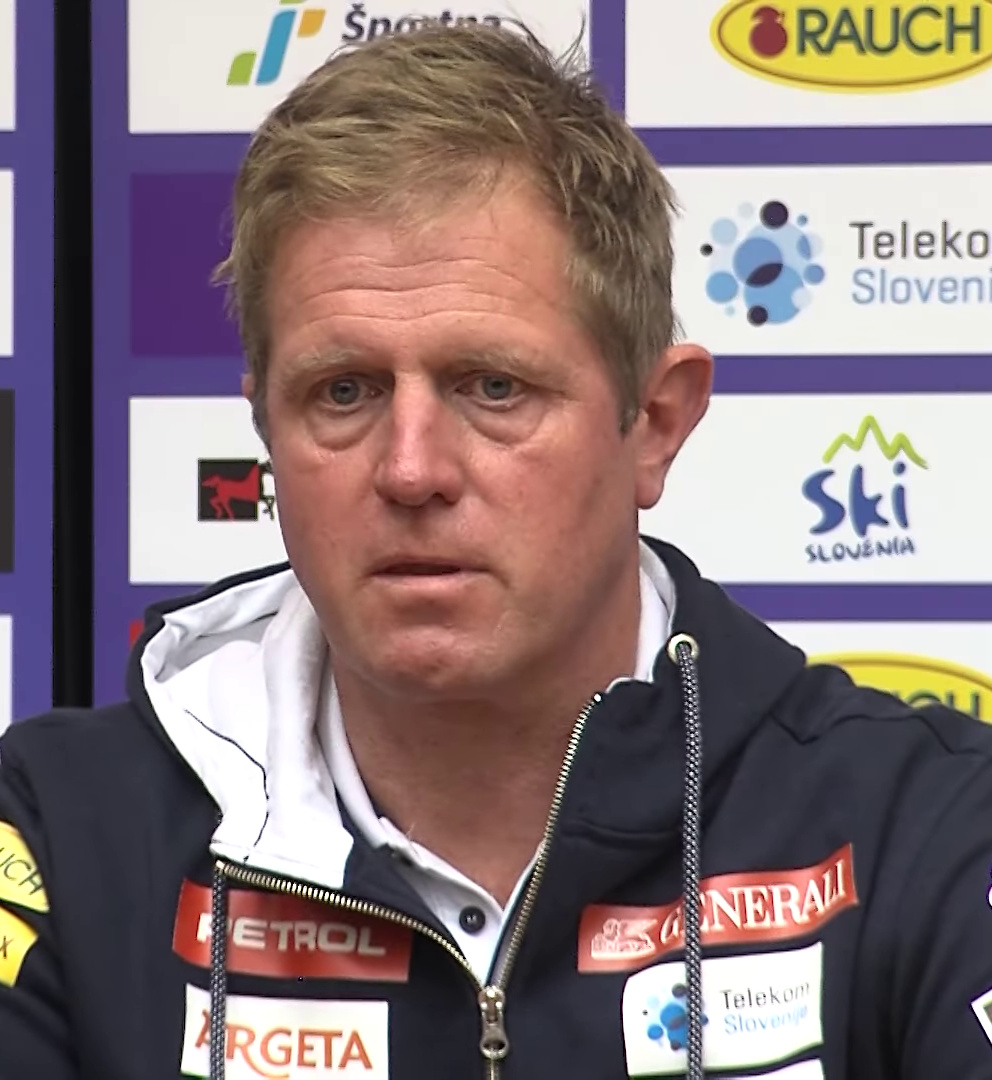
Klemen Bergant

Klemen Bergant (born 14 September 1966) is a Slovenian former alpine skier who competed for Yugoslavia in the 1988 Winter Olympics and for Slovenia in the 1992 Winter Olympics.
