= Kellie Delka =

American-Puerto Rican skeleton racer

Kellie Delka OLY
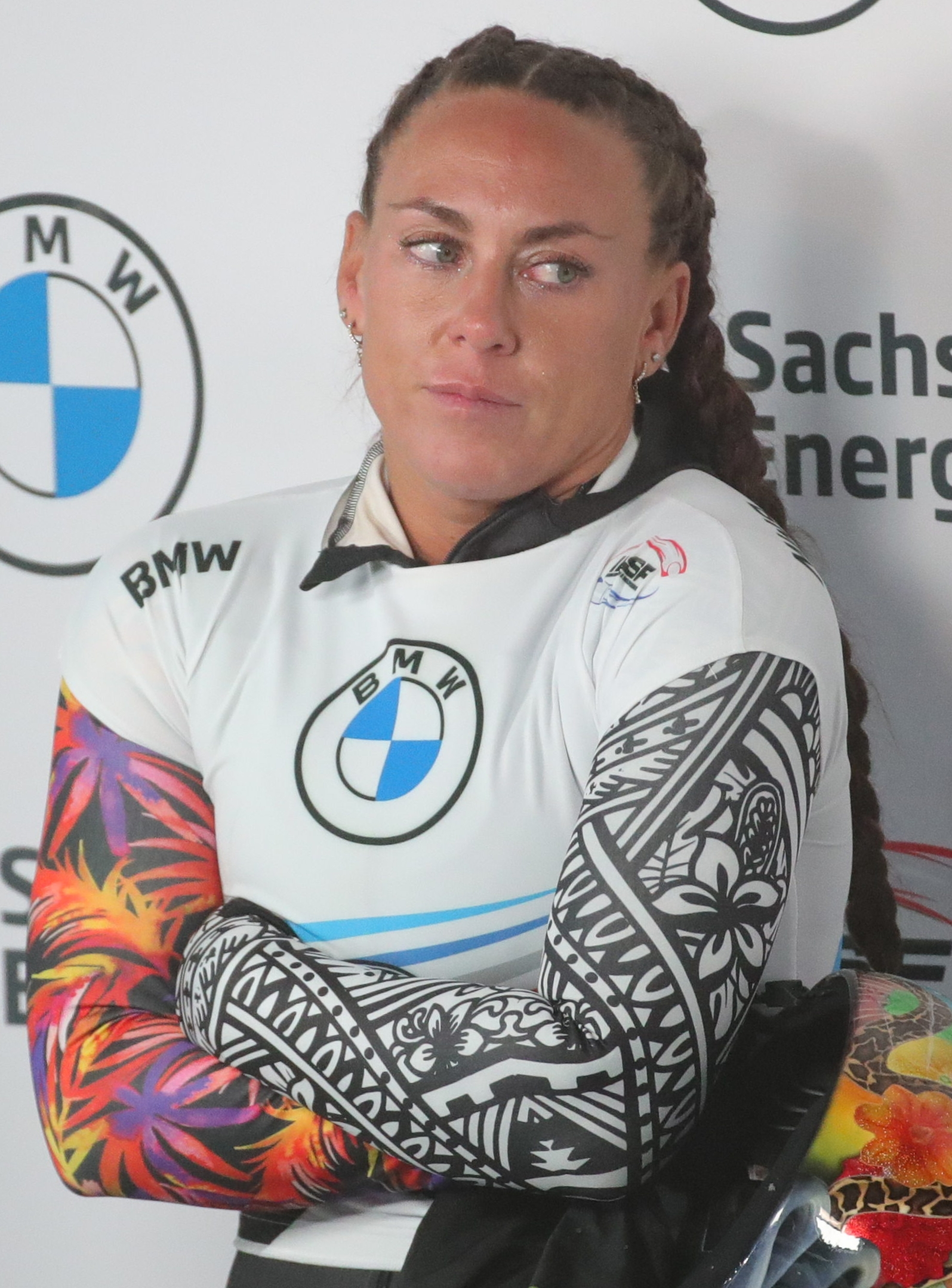
- Delka in 2023

Personal information
- Born: December 25, 1987 (age 38) Bedford, Texas, U.S.

Sport
- Country: Puerto Rico
- Sport: Skeleton

Achievements and titles
- Olympic finals: 24th (Beijing 2022); 24th (Milan 2026)

Kellie Delka (born December 25, 1987) is a Puerto Rican skeleton athlete. She represented Puerto Rico at the 2022 and 2026 Winter Olympics.

== Early life and career ==
Kellie Delka was born in Bedford, Texas. She was a pole vault athlete while at the University of North Texas, and took up skeleton in 2013, after being introduced to the sport by bobsled racer Johnny Quinn. She competed for the United States till 2017, when she switched her allegiance to Puerto Rico. She has lived in Puerto Rico ever since.

== Olympics ==
Delka was the Puerto Rican flagbearer during the opening ceremony at the 2022 and 2026 Winter Olympics. She represented the island in women's skeleton events at both the Games.

In the 2022 Winter Olympcis, the skeleton event was held at the Yanqing National Alpine Skiing Centre. Kellie Delka, who competed in the women's event, was ranked 24th out of the 25 competitors across her three runs and in the final classification. Hence, she did not make it to the final run ahead of the medal classification.

At the 2026 Games, the skeleton event was held at the Eugenio Monti Sliding Centre, Cortina d'Ampezzo. Delka, who competed in the women's event, was ranked 24th out of the 25 competitors across her first three runs and last in the fourth and final run. She was ranked 24th overall in the final classification, with a total time of three minutes and 57.31 seconds.
