= Kevin Wilson (skier) =

Puerto Rican alpine skier (born 1959)

Personal information
- Nationality: Puerto Rican
- Born: 10 May 1959 (age 65); Middleburg, Virginia, United States

Sport
- Sport: Alpine skiing

Kevin Wilson (born 10 May 1959) is a Puerto Rican alpine skier. He competed in three events at the 1988 Winter Olympics.
