= Alfredo Rego (skier) =

Guatemalan alpine skier (born 1946)

Personal information
- Nationality: Guatemalan
- Born: 29 December 1946 (age 78)

Sport
- Sport: Alpine skiing

Alfredo Rego (born 29 December 1946) is a Guatemalan alpine skier. He competed in two events at the 1988 Winter Olympics. In 1986, Rego founded the Guatemala Skiing Association.
