= Jason Edelmann =

Puerto Rican alpine skier

Personal information
- Nationality: Puerto Rican

Sport
- Sport: Alpine skiing

Jason Edelmann is a Puerto Rican alpine skier. He competed in three events at the 1988 Winter Olympics.

Former major, U.S. Marine Corps

Market president, Bank of America, Fort Lauderdale

Market executive and managing director, Merrill Lynch

Former instructor, University of Colorado Denver MBA School
