= Carlos Andrés Bruderer =

Guatemalan alpine skier (born 1967)

Personal information
- Nationality: Guatemalan
- Born: 6 January 1967 (age 58)

Sport
- Sport: Alpine skiing

Carlos Andrés Bruderer (born 6 January 1967) is a Guatemalan alpine skier. He competed in three events at the 1988 Winter Olympics.
