= Jorge Bonnet =

Puerto Rican judoka (born 1965)

Jorge L. Bonnet (born 11 May 1965) is a Puerto Rican judoka and bobsledder who competed at five Olympic Games. He competed in judo at the 1984 and 1988 Summer Olympics, and in bobsleigh at the 1992, 1994, and 1998 Winter Olympics.
