= Christian Bruderer =

Guatemalan alpine skier (born 1968)

Personal information
- Nationality: Guatemalan
- Born: 10 December 1968 (age 56)

Sport
- Sport: Alpine skiing

Christian Bruderer (born 10 December 1968) is a Guatemalan alpine skier. He competed in three events at the 1988 Winter Olympics.
