= Liston Bochette =

Puerto Rican bobsledder (born 1957)

Personal information
- Born: June 16, 1957 (age 69) Fort Myers, Florida, United States

Sport
- Sport: Track and field
Medal record
Representing Puerto Rico
Central American and Caribbean Games
Gold medal – first place	1982 Havana	Decathlon

Liston "Lin" Donneal Bochette III (born June 16, 1957) is a Puerto Rican athlete, artist and civic leader. He participated in several Olympic Games as an athlete and administrator.

== Education ==
Bochette studied at The University of Florida, Florida State University, Inter American University, the University of Puerto Rico, Pacific Western University, and was accepted at Stanford University. He collected a Bachelor's BFA degree in Fine Arts; a Master's degree MA in humanities; studied an ED abd in Education and completed a PhD in Philosophy. American University awarded him an Honorary Doctorate in Humanity. He has taught at Inter American University in the general field of communication and continues in education as a visiting professor at Tiffin University's College of Sports Management and on the distance faculty for the United States Sports Academy. In 1983 he was awarded a Citation of Merit by the Senate of Puerto Rico and in 2022 appointed as a United Nations Ambassador for Peace.

== Sports ==
Bochette was a Junior All American, attended the University of Florida on a Track and Field Scholarship offered to him by Olympic Coach Jimmy Carnes and was later inducted into the university's Hall of Fame. He competed internationally in the decathlon for the Puerto Rico Track and Field Team and won a gold medal at various levels including the 1982 Central American and Caribbean Games In addition Bochette competed internationally at the pro-am level in Modern Pentathlon. He cofounded the Fort Myers Track Club during his youth in the 1970s. Beginning in the 1980s, he worked closely with many International Olympic Committee Members, in developing programs and projects for the Olympic Family. He participated, in various capacities, in the Summer and Winter Olympic Games—as an advocate for the Olympic Movement; a qualified athlete Track and Field in 1984, as an official in 1988; and as an accredited bobsleigh athlete for Puerto Rico in 1992, 1994, 1998 and 2002. In 2002–2006, he served on the International Olympic Committee's elite Athletes Commission in Switzerland. In 1999 he was unanimously elected as Secretary General of the World Olympian Association and served two consecutive terms. International Olympic Committee. In this position he led a highly successful global campaign to unite 100,000 alumni athletes in 200 nations under the Olympic banner in order to promote Olympic values in their countries. He founded the Pan American Olympians Association in 2006 to improve fellowship among the Olympians in the hemisphere and the International Cultural Consortium in 1996 for enhancing the union between sport and cultural as an educational instrument. He was named as one of the greatest Athletes of the century in Southwest Florida by the Gannett News Press.

Bochette is the founding President of the Puerto Rico National Olympians Association and assisted over one hundred countries develop their Olympians Associations. World Olympians Association He founded the Puerto Rico national federations for Badminton, Canoe and Kayak, and Modern Pentathlon. Bochette has been an executive officer of the University of Florida Track and Field Alumni Association (UFTFAA). Bochette also serves on the UIPM Pierre De Coubertin Committee for the promotion of Olympism and its core values.

== Art ==
Bochette is best known for his drawings and paintings but also works in sculpture, stained glass, film, dance, poetry, and literature. At the 1992 Barcelona Olympic Cultural Festival he was awarded a gold medal for painting and drawing. In 1996 he was named the International Sports Artist of the Year by the United States Sports Academy and later served on the institution's Board of Trustees. He was responsible for designing branding logos at the University of Florida and served as the inaugural Director of the Olympic Sports Museum in Puerto Rico. Together with four-time Olympic Gold medalist Al Oerter he cofounded the Art of the Olympians Museum. Bochette is a consulting partner for Arnold Entertainment and film productions. He has been a key note speaker at the International Children's Art Olympiad held in Washington DC. He holds workshops for the creative development of creativity in children and adults around the world. He has exhibited in Osaka, Monte Carlo, Athens, New York, and other major cultural capitals. His art is in a number of private collections worldwide. He was commissioned by the University of Indiana to create and install a series of campus monuments. Bochette was presented a distinguished service award for culture in the Czech Republic (2023) and inducted in the Fédération Internationale Cinéma Télévision Sportifs Hall of Fame (2024). He also serves on the Santo Domingo Film Festival Board.

== Public Service ==
Bochette assisted in setting up the Al Oerter Center for Excellence and serves on the Board of the Uncommon Friends Foundation (Thomas Edison and Henry Ford et al.). He has Chaired the Olympian Foundation since its inception. Bochette has worked on camera broadcast with major networks including Telemundo as well as appearing on CBS, NBC, and CNN. He has addressed meetings at the United Nations as well as being a delegate to the White House on Olympic issues. Bochette has served as an appointed and an elected official in government with distinction as Councilman and Mayor Pro-Tem for the City of Fort Myers, Florida. He has served on the Florida League of Cities State Finance and Economic Development Committees. He is a fiscal conservative who fully supports the arts, education, and the environment. He created the Environmental Committee, and also liaisons with the Historical Preservation, Art, Beautification, and Bike / Pedestrian Committees. He serves on the Lee County Tourism Council and is a speaker on tourism development for the State of Florida. In addition has lectured around the world in locations such as Cairo, St. Petersburg, Tokyo, London.
