= Speed skating at the 1972 Winter Olympics – Women's 1000 metres =

Women's 1000 metres at the XI Olympic Winter Games
- Pictogram for speed skating
- Venue: Makomanai Open Stadium
- Dates: February 11, 1972
- Competitors: 33 from 12 nations
- Winning time: 1:31.40

Medalists
1st place, gold medalist(s)		Monika Pflug; West Germany
2nd place, silver medalist(s)		Atje Keulen-Deelstra; Netherlands
3rd place, bronze medalist(s)		Anne Henning; United States

The women's 1000 metres in speed skating at the 1972 Winter Olympics took place on 11 February, at the Makomanai Open Stadium.

== Records ==
Prior to this competition, the existing world and Olympic records were as follows:

World record	Anne Henning (USA)	1:27.30	Davos, Switzerland	8 January 1972
Olympic record	Carry Geijssen (NED)	1:32.6	Grenoble, France	11 February 1968

The following new Olympic record was set.

Date	Athlete	Time	OR	WR
11 February	Monika Pflug (FRG)	1:31.40	OR	

== Results ==
Rank	Athlete	Country	Time	Notes
1st place, gold medalist(s)	Monika Pflug	West Germany	1:31.40	OR
2nd place, silver medalist(s)	Atje Keulen-Deelstra	Netherlands	1:31.61	
3rd place, bronze medalist(s)	Anne Henning	United States	1:31.62	
4	Lyudmila Titova	Soviet Union	1:31.85	
5	Nina Statkevich	Soviet Union	1:32.21	
6	Dianne Holum	United States	1:32.41	
7	Ellie van den Brom	Netherlands	1:32.60	
8	Sylvia Burka	Canada	1:32.95	
9	Sigrid Sundby-Dybedahl	Norway	1:33.13	
10	Lyudmila Savrulina	Soviet Union	1:33.41	
11	Tuula Vilkas	Finland	1:33.51	
12	Han Pil-Hwa	North Korea	1:33.79	
12	Rosemarie Taupadel	East Germany	1:33.79	
14	Ylva Hedlund	Sweden	1:33.82	
15	Emiko Taguchi	Japan	1:34.40	
16	Paula Dufter	West Germany	1:34.86	
17	Sheila Young	United States	1:34.97	
18	Sachiko Saito	Japan	1:35.12	
19	Ann-Sofie Järnström	Sweden	1:35.21	
20	Tak In-Suk	North Korea	1:35.38	
21	Arja Kantola	Finland	1:35.45	
22	Lisbeth Korsmo-Berg	Norway	1:35.56	
23	Kirsti Biermann	Norway	1:35.76	
24	Trijnie Rep	Netherlands	1:35.82	
25	Jeon Seon-ok	South Korea	1:36.24	
26	Lee Gyeong-hui	South Korea	1:36.50	
27	Choi Dong-ok	North Korea	1:36.67	
28	Ryoko Onozawa	Japan	1:36.99	
29	Cathy Priestner	Canada	1:37.11	
30	Sylvia Filipsson	Sweden	1:37.24	
31	Choi Jung-hui	South Korea	1:37.57	
32	Gayle Gordon	Canada	1:38.32	
33	Ruth Schleiermacher	East Germany	1:52.65	
