= 1969 World Allround Speed Skating Championships for women =

International speed skating competition

1969 World Allround Speed Skating Championships for Women
- Venue: L'Anneau de Vitesse, Grenoble, France
- Dates: 1–2 February
- Competitors: 29 from 11 nations

Medalist women
1st place, gold medalist(s)		Lāsma Kauniste	SOV
2nd place, silver medalist(s)		Stien Kaiser	NED
3rd place, bronze medalist(s)		Ans Schut	NED

The 30th edition of the World Allround Speed Skating Championships for Women took place on 1 and 2 February 1969 in Grenoble at the L'Anneau de Vitesse ice rink.

Title holder was the Netherlander Stien Kaiser.

== Distance medalists ==
Event	Gold (gold)	Silver (silver)	Bronze (bronze)
500m	Kirsti Biermann	Ruth Schleiermacher	Lāsma Kauniste
1500m	Stien Kaiser	Ellie van den Brom	Lāsma Kauniste; Lyudmila Mokhnacheva
1000m	Lāsma Kauniste	Ellie van den Brom	Lyudmila Titova
3000m	Ans Schut	Stien Kaiser	Wil Burgmeijer

== Classification ==
Rank	Skater	Country	Points Samalog	500m	1500m	1000m	3000m
1st place, gold medalist(s)	Lāsma Kauniste	Soviet Union	189.567	45.6 (3)	2:23.7 (3)	1:31.2 (gold)	5:02.8 (6)
2nd place, silver medalist(s)	Stien Kaiser	Netherlands	190.484	48.1 (18)	2:21.5 (gold)	1:32.7 (5)	4:53.2 (2)
3rd place, bronze medalist(s)	Ans Schut	Netherlands	190.584	47.1 (13)	2:23.9 (5)	1:33.7 (9)	4:52.0 (gold)
4	Ruth Schleiermacher	East Germany	191.800	45.5 (2)	2:26.1 (11)	1:32.3 (4)	5:08.7 (10)
5	Lyudmila Mokhnacheva	Soviet Union	191.883	47.2 (14)	2:23.7 (3)	1:33.4 (7)	5:00.5 (4)
6	Wil Burgmeijer	Netherlands	192.417	46.6 (10)	2:25.1 (7)	1:32.5 (16)	4:59.1 (3)
7	Kirsti Biermann	Norway	192.550	45.1 (gold)	2:24.2 (6)	1:34.0 (10)	5:14.3 (14)
8	Lyudmila Titova	Soviet Union	192.817	45.9 (6)	2:26.4 (12)	1:32.1 (3)	5:12.4 (13)
9	Galina Nefyodova	Soviet Union	193.084	46.3 (7)	2:25.7 (9)	1:34.2 (13)	5:06.7 (7)
10	Lisbeth Berg	Norway	193.234	45.8 (4)	2:26.9 (15)	1:34.2 (13)	5:08.2 (9)
11	Sigrid Sundby	Norway	194.267	45.8 (4)	2:26.6 (14)	1:33.3 (6)	5:17.6 (16)
12	Dianne Holum	United States	194.883	46.9 (12)	2:26.5 (13)	1:33.5 (8)	5:14.4 (15)
13	Kaija-Liisa Keskivitikka	Finland	195.200	48.2 (19)	2:26.0 (10)	1:34.1 (12)	5:07.7 (8)
14	Carry Geijssen	Netherlands	195.517	48.7 (20)	2:25.1 (7)	1:34.0 (10)	5:08.7 (10)
15	Rosemarie Taupadel	East Germany	197.300	46.8 (11)	2:28.4 (17)	1:35.4 (17)	5:20.0 (17)
16	Akiko Aruga	Japan	197.867	49.5 (24)	2:27.0 (16)	1:34.8 (15)	5:11.8 (12)
NC17	Jeanne Omelenchuk	United States	144.550	46.5 (8)	2:30.1 (19)	1:36.1 (19)	–
NC18	Tarja Rinne	Finland	144.667	47.2 (14)	2:29.0 (18)	1:35.6 (18)	–
NC19	Vera Krasnova	Soviet Union	145.850	46.5 (8)	2:33.0 (22)	1:36.7 (20)	–
NC20	Ylva Hedlund	Sweden	146.400	47.9 (17)	2:30.0 (19)	1:37.0 (22)	–
NC21	Arja Kantola	Finland	147.033	47.4 (16)	2:33.7 (25)	1:36.8 (21)	–
NC22	Marie-Louise Perrenoud	France	149.000	48.8 (21)	2:33.3 (23)	1:38.8 (25)	–
NC23	Helena Pilejczyk	Poland	149.717	49.4 (22)	2:33.5 (24)	1:38.3 (23)	–
NC24	Kornélia Ihász	Hungary	149.750	49.4 (22)	2:32.1 (21)	1:39.3 (26)	–
NC25	Romana Troicka	Poland	150.883	49.9 (25)	2:35.2 (26)	1:38.5 (24)	–
NC26	Kaname Ide	Japan	153.233	50.8 (27)	2:37.3 (27)	1:40.0 (27)	–
NC27	Sylvie Chevauchet	France	153.967	50.4 (26)	2:38.0 (28)	1:41.8 (28)	–
NC28	Tonny Monari	France	155.917	51.0 (28)	2:39.2 (29)	1:43.7 (29)	–
NC	Ellie van den Brom	Netherlands	144.167	DNF	2:23.4 (2)	1:31.9 (2)	5:02.5 (5)

DNF = Did not finish

== Attribution ==
In Dutch
