= Speed skating at the 1972 Winter Olympics – Women's 1500 metres =

Women's 1500 metres at the XI Olympic Winter Games
- Pictogram for speed skating
- Venue: Makomanai Open Stadium
- Dates: February 9, 1972
- Competitors: 31 from 12 nations
- Winning time: 2:20.85

Medalists
1st place, gold medalist(s)		Dianne Holum; United States
2nd place, silver medalist(s)		Stien Kaiser; Netherlands
3rd place, bronze medalist(s)		Atje Keulen-Deelstra; Netherlands

The women's 1500 metres in speed skating at the 1972 Winter Olympics took place on February 9, at the Makomanai Open Stadium.

== Records ==
Prior to this competition, the existing world and Olympic records were as follows:

World record	Stien Kaiser (NED)	2:15.8	Davos, Switzerland	15 January 1971
Olympic record	Kaija Mustonen (FIN)	2:22.4	Grenoble, France	10 February 1968

The following new World and Olympic records was set during the competition.

Date	Pair	Athlete	Country	Time	OR	WR
9 February	Pair 1	Atje Keulen-Deelstra	Netherlands	2:22.05	OR	
9 February	Pair 5	Dianne Holum	United States	2:20.85	OR	

== Results ==
Rank	Athlete	Country	Time	Notes
1st place, gold medalist(s)	Dianne Holum	United States	2:20.85	OR
2nd place, silver medalist(s)	Stien Baas-Kaiser	Netherlands	2:21.05	
3rd place, bronze medalist(s)	Atje Keulen-Deelstra	Netherlands	2:22.05	
4	Ellie van den Brom	Netherlands	2:22.27	
5	Rosemarie Taupadel	East Germany	2:22.35	
6	Nina Statkevich	Soviet Union	2:23.19	
7	Connie Carpenter-Phinney	United States	2:23.93	
8	Sigrid Sundby-Dybedahl	Norway	2:24.07	
9	Kapitolina Seryogina	Soviet Union	2:24.29	
10	Monika Pflug	West Germany	2:24.69	
11	Satomi Koike	Japan	2:25.16	
12	Kim Bok-soon	North Korea	2:25.48	
13	Han Pil-Hwa	North Korea	2:25.64	
14	Lyudmila Savrulina	Soviet Union	2:25.85	
15	Paula Dufter	West Germany	2:26.00	
16	Tuula Vilkas	Finland	2:27.09	
17	Emiko Taguchi	Japan	2:28.19	
18	Kaname Ide	Japan	2:28.34	
19	Lisbeth Korsmo-Berg	Norway	2:28.36	
20	Sylvia Filipsson	Sweden	2:29.38	
21	Sylvia Burka	Canada	2:29.60	
22	Choi Jung-Hui	South Korea	2:29.79	
23	Kirsti Biermann	Norway	2:29.94	
24	Leah Poulos	United States	2:31.29	
25	Ylva Hedlund	Sweden	2:31.31	
26	Ann-Sofie Järnström	Sweden	2:31.53	
27	Gayle Gordon	Canada	2:31.86	
28	Jeon Seon-ok	South Korea	2:32.06	
29	Kim Myung-ja	North Korea	2:32.55	
30	Jennifer Jackson	Canada	2:35.22	
31	Monika Stützle	West Germany	2:37.15	
