= World Sprint Speed Skating Championships for Women =

The International Skating Union has organised the World Sprint Speed Skating Championships for Women since 1970. The first two years (1970 and 1971), they were called the ISU Sprint Championships.

== History ==
=== Distances used ===
- Since 1970, four distances are skated: 500 m, 1000 m, 500 m and 1000 m (the sprint combination).
- In 2022, team sprint event has been held as well.

=== Ranking systems used ===
- Since 1970, the samalog system has been in use. However, the rule that a skater winning at least three distances was automatically World Champion remained in effect until (and including) 1986. This rule was applied in 1985 when Christa Rothenburger from East Germany won three of four distances and thus become World Champion despite she had only 7th result in samalog score due to fall at third distance (second 500 m).

=== Records ===
- Karin Kania (Enke, Busch) from East Germany has won a total of 6 world championship titles, in 1980, 1981, 1983, 1984, 1986 and 1987.
- Bonnie Blair from the United States has a record 9 medals – three golds (1989, 1994, 1995), four silvers (1987, 1990, 1992, 1993) and two bronzes (1986, 1988).
- Monique Garbrecht-Enfeldt from Germany has won record three consecutive world championships, in 1999, 2000 and 2001 (and another two titles in 1991 and 2003).
- The youngest World Sprint Champion is Monika Pflug from West Germany who won her only world sprint title in 1972 at age 17.
- The oldest World Sprint Champion is Monique Garbrecht-Enfeldt from Germany who was 34 years and 38 days old when she was her fifth and last world sprint title in 2003.
- Edel Therese Høiseth from Norway hold record by number of participations in the championships (19 times in 1984–2002).
- The biggest point margin between the winner and the second placed skater at the end of competition is 3.465 points between Karin Enke from East Germany and Leah Poulos-Mueller from the United States in 1980.
- At the 1985 championships, Christa Rothenburger from East Germany won three of four distances and thus become World Sprint Champion in accordance with then-existing rule. Due to fall at third distance (31st place at second 500 m), she had only 7th result in points classification by losing 3.565 points to her compatriot Angela Stahnke who eventually become silver medalist. Without taking into account this case, the smallest winning margin between the champion and the runner-up is 0.020 points between Yu Jing from China and Christine Nesbitt from Canada in 2012.
- There are eight speed skaters who become World Sprint Champions by winning all four distances at the championships – Sheila Young from the United States (1976), Natalya Petrusyova from the Soviet Union (1982), Karin Enke from East Germany (1984), Bonnie Blair from the United States (1994 and 1995), Franziska Schenk from Germany (1997), Monique Garbrecht-Enfeldt from Germany (2003), Brittany Bowe from the United States (2015) and Femke Kok from Netherlands (2026). Bonnie Blair is the only speed skater who achieved this feat twice.
- By contrast, there are five speed skaters who become World Sprint Champions without winning any of four distances – Ruth Schleiermacher from East Germany (1971), Monika Pflug from West Germany (1972), Leah Poulos from the United States (1974), Marianne Timmer from Netherlands (2004) and Wang Beixing from China (2009).
- There are five female speed skaters who become champions both at the World Sprint Championships and the World Allround Championships – Sylvia Burka from Canada (Allround: 1976; Sprint: 1977), Natalya Petrusyova from the Soviet Union (Allround: 1980, 1981; Sprint: 1982), Karin Kania (Enke, Busch) from East Germany (Allround: 1982, 1984, 1986, 1987, 1988; Sprint: 1980, 1981, 1983, 1984, 1986, 1987), Anni Friesinger from Germany (Allround: 2001, 2002, 2005; Sprint: 2007) and Miho Takagi from Japan (Allround: 2018; Sprint: 2020, 2024). Karin Kania (Enke, Busch) remained the only female speed skater who win both championships in one calendar year by firstly achieving this feat in 1984 and then repeating this success in 1986 and 1987. Anni Friesinger and Miho Takagi are the only female speed skaters who won world titles at three different championships – World Allround Championships, World Sprint Championships and World Single Distances Championships (at the latter competition Friesinger won 12 gold medals in 1998–2009 and Takagi won six gold medals in 2015–2025).

== Medal winners ==
=== Sprint combination ===
Year	Venue	Gold	Silver	Bronze
1970	West Allis	(Soviet Union) Lyudmila Titova	(Soviet Union) Nina Statkevich	(Netherlands) Atje Keulen-Deelstra
1971	Inzell	(East Germany) Ruth Schleiermacher	(United States) Anne Henning	(United States) Dianne Holum
1972	Eskilstuna	(West Germany) Monika Pflug	(United States) Dianne Holum	(Soviet Union) Lyudmila Titova
1973	Oslo	(United States) Sheila Young	(Netherlands) Atje Keulen-Deelstra	(West Germany) Monika Pflug
1974	Innsbruck	(United States) Leah Poulos	(Netherlands) Atje Keulen-Deelstra	(West Germany) Monika Pflug
1975	Gothenburg	(United States) Sheila Young	(East Germany) Heike Lange	(Canada) Cathy Priestner
1976	West Berlin	(United States) Sheila Young (3)	(United States) Leah Poulos	(Canada) Sylvia Burka
1977	Alkmaar	(Canada) Sylvia Burka	(United States) Leah Poulos	(Netherlands) Haitske Pijlman
1978	Lake Placid	(Soviet Union) Lyubov Sadchikova	(United States) Beth Heiden	(Poland) Erwina Ryś-Ferens
1979	Inzell	(United States) Leah Poulos-Mueller (2)	(United States) Beth Heiden	(East Germany) Christa Rothenburger
1980	West Allis	(East Germany) Karin Enke	(United States) Leah Poulos-Mueller	(United States) Beth Heiden
1981	Grenoble	(East Germany) Karin Enke	(Soviet Union) Tatyana Tarasova	(Soviet Union) Natalya Petrusyova
1982	Alkmaar	(Soviet Union) Natalya Petrusyova	(East Germany) Karin Busch	(West Germany) Monika Holzner-Pflug
1983	Helsinki	(East Germany) Karin Enke	(Soviet Union) Natalya Petrusyova	(East Germany) Christa Rothenburger
1984	Trondheim	(East Germany) Karin Enke	(Soviet Union) Valentina Lalenkova	(Soviet Union) Natalya Shive
1985	Heerenveen	(East Germany) Christa Rothenburger	(East Germany) Angela Stahnke	(Poland) Erwina Ryś-Ferens
1986	Karuizawa	(East Germany) Karin Kania	(East Germany) Christa Rothenburger	(United States) Bonnie Blair
1987	Sainte Foy	(East Germany) Karin Kania (6)	(United States) Bonnie Blair	(East Germany) Christa Rothenburger
1988	West Allis	(East Germany) Christa Rothenburger (2)	(East Germany) Karin Kania	(United States) Bonnie Blair
1989	Heerenveen	(United States) Bonnie Blair	(East Germany) Christa Luding-Rothenburger	(Japan) Seiko Hashimoto
1990	Tromsø	(East Germany) Angela Hauck-Stahnke	(United States) Bonnie Blair	(Netherlands) Christine Aaftink
1991	Inzell	(Germany) Monique Garbrecht	(China) Ye Qiaobo	(Netherlands) Christine Aaftink
1992	Oslo	(China) Ye Qiaobo	(United States) Bonnie Blair	(Germany) Christa Luding-Rothenburger
1993	Ikaho	(China) Ye Qiaobo (2)	(United States) Bonnie Blair	(Russia) Oksana Ravilova
1994	Calgary	(United States) Bonnie Blair	(Germany) Angela Hauck-Stahnke	(China) Xue Ruihong
1995	Milwaukee	(United States) Bonnie Blair (3)	(Russia) Oksana Ravilova	(Germany) Franziska Schenk
1996	Heerenveen	(United States) Chris Witty	(Norway) Edel Therese Høiseth	(Germany) Franziska Schenk
1997	Hamar	(Germany) Franziska Schenk	(China) Xue Ruihong	(United States) Chris Witty
1998	Berlin	(Canada) Catriona Le May Doan	(Germany) Sabine Völker	(United States) Chris Witty
1999	Calgary	(Germany) Monique Garbrecht	(Canada) Catriona Le May Doan	(Germany) Sabine Völker
2000	Seoul	(Germany) Monique Garbrecht	(United States) Chris Witty	(Netherlands) Marianne Timmer
2001	Inzell	(Germany) Monique Garbrecht-Enfeldt	(Japan) Eriko Sanmiya	(Canada) Catriona Le May Doan
2002	Hamar	(Canada) Catriona Le May Doan (2)	(Netherlands) Andrea Nuyt	(Belarus) Anzhelika Kotyuga
2003	Calgary	(Germany) Monique Garbrecht-Enfeldt (5)	(Canada) Cindy Klassen	(Japan) Shihomi Shinya
2004	Nagano	(Netherlands) Marianne Timmer	(Germany) Anni Friesinger	(United States) Jennifer Rodriguez
2005	Salt Lake City	(United States) Jennifer Rodriguez	(Belarus) Anzhelika Kotyuga	(Germany) Sabine Völker
2006	Heerenveen	(Russia) Svetlana Zhurova	(China) Wang Manli	(Italy) Chiara Simionato
2007	Hamar	(Germany) Anni Friesinger	(Netherlands) Ireen Wüst	(Canada) Cindy Klassen
2008	Heerenveen	(Germany) Jenny Wolf	(Germany) Anni Friesinger	(Netherlands) Annette Gerritsen
2009	Moscow	(China) Wang Beixing	(Germany) Jenny Wolf	(China) Yu Jing
2010	Obihiro	(South Korea) Lee Sang-hwa	(Japan) Sayuri Yoshii	(Germany) Jenny Wolf
2011	Heerenveen	(Canada) Christine Nesbitt	(Netherlands) Annette Gerritsen	(Netherlands) Margot Boer
2012	Calgary	(China) Yu Jing	(Canada) Christine Nesbitt	(China) Zhang Hong
2013	Salt Lake City	(United States) Heather Richardson	(China) Yu Jing	(South Korea) Lee Sang-hwa
2014	Nagano	(China) Yu Jing (2)	(China) Zhang Hong	(United States) Heather Richardson
2015	Astana	(United States) Brittany Bowe	(United States) Heather Richardson	(Czech Republic) Karolína Erbanová
2016	Seoul	(United States) Brittany Bowe (2)	(United States) Heather Richardson-Bergsma	(Netherlands) Jorien ter Mors
2017	Calgary	(Japan) Nao Kodaira	(United States) Heather Bergsma	(Netherlands) Jorien ter Mors
2018	Changchun	(Netherlands) Jorien ter Mors	(United States) Brittany Bowe	(Russia) Olga Fatkulina
2019	Heerenveen	(Japan) Nao Kodaira (2)	(Japan) Miho Takagi	(United States) Brittany Bowe
2020	Hamar	(Japan) Miho Takagi	(Japan) Nao Kodaira	(Russia) Olga Fatkulina
2022	Hamar	(Netherlands) Jutta Leerdam	(Netherlands) Femke Kok	(Austria) Vanessa Herzog
2024	Inzell	(Japan) Miho Takagi (2)	(Netherlands) Femke Kok	(Netherlands) Jutta Leerdam
2026	Heerenveen	(Netherlands) Femke Kok	(Netherlands) Suzanne Schulting	(Netherlands) Marrit Fledderus

==== Medal table ====
Rank	Nation	Gold	Silver	Bronze	Total
1	United States	13	16	9	38
2	East Germany	10	6	3	19
3	Germany	8	5	6	19
4	China	5	5	3	13
5	Netherlands	4	8	11	23
6	Japan	4	4	2	10
7	Canada	4	3	4	11
8	Soviet Union	3	4	3	10
9	Russia	1	1	3	5
10	West Germany	1	0	3	4
11	South Korea	1	0	1	2
12	Belarus	0	1	1	2
13	Norway	0	1	0	1
14	Poland	0	0	2	2
15	Austria	0	0	1	1
15	Czech Republic	0	0	1	1
15	Italy	0	0	1	1
Totals (17 entries)		54	54	54	162

=== Team sprint ===
Year	Venue	Gold	Silver	Bronze
2022	Hamar	Netherlands; Dione Voskamp; Jutta Leerdam; Femke Kok	Poland; Andżelika Wójcik; Kaja Ziomek; Karolina Bosiek	Norway; Julie Nistad Samsonsen; Martine Ripsrud; Marte Bjerkreim Furnée

==== Medal table ====
Rank	Nation	Gold	Silver	Bronze	Total
1	Netherlands	1	0	0	1
2	Poland	0	1	0	1
3	Norway	0	0	1	1
Totals (3 entries)		1	1	1	3

== Combined medal table ==
Rank	Nation	Gold	Silver	Bronze	Total
1	United States	13	16	9	38
2	East Germany	10	6	3	19
3	Germany	8	5	6	19
4	Netherlands	5	8	11	24
5	China	5	5	3	13
6	Japan	4	4	2	10
7	Canada	4	3	4	11
8	Soviet Union	3	4	3	10
9	Russia	1	1	3	5
10	West Germany	1	0	3	4
11	South Korea	1	0	1	2
12	Poland	0	1	2	3
13	Belarus	0	1	1	2
13	Norway	0	1	1	2
15	Austria	0	0	1	1
15	Czech Republic	0	0	1	1
15	Italy	0	0	1	1
Totals (17 entries)		55	55	55	165

== World champions (sprint combination) ==
As of 2026.

Skater	1st place, gold medalist(s)	2nd place, silver medalist(s)	3rd place, bronze medalist(s)	Total
(East Germany) Karin Kania (Enke, Busch)	6	2	0	8
(Germany) Monique Garbrecht-Enfeldt	5	0	0	5
(United States) Bonnie Blair	3	4	2	9
(United States) Sheila Young	3	0	0	3
(United States) Leah Poulos-Mueller	2	3	0	5
(East Germany) / (Germany) Christa Luding-Rothenburger	2	2	4	8
(United States) Brittany Bowe	2	1	1	4
(Canada) Catriona Le May Doan	2	1	1	4
(China) Yu Jing	2	1	1	4
(Japan) Nao Kodaira	2	1	0	2
(Japan) Miho Takagi	2	1	0	3
(China) Ye Qiaobo	2	1	0	3
(United States) Heather Richardson-Bergsma	1	3	1	5
(Germany) Anni Friesinger-Postma	1	2	0	3
(East Germany) / (Germany) Angela Hauck-Stahnke	1	2	0	3
(Netherlands) Femke Kok	1	2	0	3
(United States) Chris Witty	1	1	2	4
(Soviet Union) Natalya Petrusyova	1	1	1	3
(Germany) Jenny Wolf	1	1	1	3
(Canada) Christine Nesbitt	1	1	0	2
(West Germany) Monika Pflug	1	0	3	4
(Germany) Franziska Schenk	1	0	2	3
(Netherlands) Jorien ter Mors	1	0	2	3
(Canada) Sylvia Burka	1	0	1	2
(South Korea) Lee Sang-hwa	1	0	1	2
(Netherlands) Jutta Leerdam	1	0	1	2
(United States) Jennifer Rodriguez	1	0	1	2
(Netherlands) Marianne Timmer	1	0	1	2
(Soviet Union) Lyudmila Titova	1	0	1	2
(Soviet Union) Lyubov Sadchikova	1	0	0	1
(East Germany) Ruth Schleiermacher	1	0	0	1
(China) Wang Beixing	1	0	0	1
(Russia) Svetlana Zhurova	1	0	0	1

== See also ==
- World Sprint Speed Skating Championships for Men
- World Allround Speed Skating Championships
- World Single Distances Speed Skating Championships
- World record progression sprint combination speed skating women
