= Speed skating at the 1972 Winter Olympics – Women's 3000 metres =

Women's 3000 metres at the XI Olympic Winter Games
- Pictogram for speed skating
- Venue: Makomanai Open Stadium
- Dates: February 12, 1972
- Competitors: 22 from 10 nations
- Winning time: 4:52.14

Medalists
1st place, gold medalist(s)		Stien Kaiser; Netherlands
2nd place, silver medalist(s)		Dianne Holum; United States
3rd place, bronze medalist(s)		Atje Keulen-Deelstra; Netherlands

The women's 3000 metres in speed skating at the 1972 Winter Olympics took place on 12 February, at the Makomanai Open Stadium.

== Records ==
Prior to this competition, the existing world and Olympic records were as follows:

World record	Stien Kaiser (NED)	4:46.5	Davos, Switzerland	16 January 1971
Olympic record	Ans Schut (NED)	4:56.2	Grenoble, France	12 February 1968

The following new Olympic record was set.

Date	Pair	Athlete	Country	Time	OR	WR
12 February	Pair 10	Stien Kaiser	Netherlands	4:52.14	OR	

== Results ==
Rank	Athlete	Country	Time	Notes
1st place, gold medalist(s)	Stien Baas-Kaiser	Netherlands	4:52.14	OR
2nd place, silver medalist(s)	Dianne Holum	United States	4:58.67	
3rd place, bronze medalist(s)	Atje Keulen-Deelstra	Netherlands	4:59.91	
4	Sippie Tigchelaar	Netherlands	5:01.67	
5	Nina Statkevich	Soviet Union	5:01.79	
6	Kapitolina Seregina	Soviet Union	5:01.88	
7	Tuula Vilkas	Finland	5:05.92	
8	Lyudmila Savrulina	Soviet Union	5:06.61	
9	Han Pil-Hwa	North Korea	5:07.24	
10	Sigrid Sundby-Dybedahl	Norway	5:07.76	
11	Kim Bok-soon	North Korea	5:07.93	
12	Satomi Koike	Japan	5:09.21	
13	Kim Ok-soon	North Korea	5:09.69	
14	Sylvia Filipsson	Sweden	5:11.13	
15	Rosemarie Taupadel	East Germany	5:12.85	
16	Kaname Ide	Japan	5:17.30	
17	Leah Poulos	United States	5:17.38	
18	Akiko Aruga	Japan	5:22.60	
19	Jeon Seon-Ok	South Korea	5:24.27	
20	Kirsti Biermann	Norway	5:26.21	
21	Arja Kantola	Finland	5:30.88	
22	Jeanne Omelenchuk	United States	5:32.87	
