= 1980 World Allround Speed Skating Championships for women =

International speed skating competition

1980 World Allround Speed Skating Championships for Women
- Venue: Hamar stadion, Hamar, Norway
- Dates: 12–13 February
- Competitors: 31 from 13 nations

Medalist women
1st place, gold medalist(s)		Natalya Petrusyova	SOV
2nd place, silver medalist(s)		Beth Heiden	USA
3rd place, bronze medalist(s)		Bjørg Eva Jensen	NOR

The 41st edition of the World Allround Speed Skating Championships for Women took place on 12 and 13 February in Hamar at the Hamar ice rink.

Title holder was Beth Heiden from the USA.

== Distance medalists ==
Event	Gold (gold)	Silver (silver)	Bronze (bronze)
500m	Natalya Petrusyova	Makiko Nagaya	Sylvia Burka; Nataliya Kurova
1500m	Natalya Petrusyova	Sylvia Filipsson	Bjørg Eva Jensen
1000m	Natalya Petrusyova	Bjørg Eva Jensen	Beth Heiden
3000m	Bjørg Eva Jensen	Beth Heiden	Sarah Docter

== Classification ==
Rank	Skater	Country	Points Samalog	500m	1500m	1000m	3000m
1st place, gold medalist(s)	Natalya Petrusyova	Soviet Union	179.046	43.6 (gold)	2:15.98 (gold)	1:25.54 (gold)	4:44.10 (6)
2nd place, silver medalist(s)	Beth Heiden	United States	180.163	44.3 (5)	2:17.23 (4)	1:27.46 (3)	4:38.34 (2)
3rd place, bronze medalist(s)	Bjørg Eva Jensen	Norway	180.992	45.3 (17)	2:17.12 (3)	1:27.35 (2)	4:37.45 (gold)
4	Sylvia Filipsson	Sweden	181.136	44.5 (7)	2:17.10 (2)	1:27.51 (5)	4:43.09 (5)
5	Sabine Becker	East Germany	182.028	44.9 (11)	2:17.56 (5)	1:28.42 (10)	4:42.39 (4)
6	Sylvia Burka	Canada	182.065	44.3 (3)	2:19.02 (8)	1:27.50 (4)	4:46.65 (7)
7	Sarah Docter	United States	182.380	45.3 (17)	2:18.45 (6)	1:28.22 (7)	4:40.92 (3)
8	Valentina Lalenkova-Golovenkina	Soviet Union	183.865	44.7 (8)	2:20.34 (11)	1:27.80 (6)	4:50.91 (10)
9	Erwina Ryś-Ferens	Poland	184.487	44.7 (8)	2:20.39 (12)	1:28.23 (9)	4:53.26 (12)
10	Nataliya Kurova	Soviet Union	184.621	44.2 (3)	2:19.57 (10)	1:28.45 (11)	4:58.04 (16)
11	Sylvia Albrecht	East Germany	184.689	44.8 (10)	2:20.66 (13)	1:28.22 (7)	4:53.36 (13)
12	Annie Borckink	Netherlands	184.956	45.5 (21)	2:19.23 (9)	1:29.07 (14)	4:51.07 (11)
13	Lisbeth Korsmo-Berg	Norway	185.903	45.0 (12)	2:21.42 (15)	1:31.12 (26)	4:49.22 (9)
14	Ria Visser	Netherlands	185.971	46.4 (28)	2:18.74 (7)	1:30.98 (24)	4:47.01 (8)
15	Sigrid Smuda	West Germany	186.267	45.0 (12)	2:21.53 (16)	1:30.30 (20)	4:53.65 (14)
16	Yuko Yaegashi-Ota	Japan	186.842	45.7 (22)	2:20.72 (14)	1:29.76 (18)	4:56.14 (15)
NC17	Karin Enke	East Germany	136.360	44.3 (5)	2:22.62 (21)	1:29.04 (12)	–
NC18	Makiko Nagaya	Japan	136.795	44.1 (2)	2:23.97 (25)	1:29.41 (15)	–
NC19	Kim Kostron	United States	136.993	45.2 (15)	2:21.79 (17)	1:29.06 (13)	–
NC20	Annette Karlsson	Sweden	137.430	45.3 (17)	2:21.93 (18)	1:29.64 (16)	–
NC21	Sijtje van der Lende	Netherlands	138.330	46.0 (25)	2:22.11 (19)	1:29.92 (19)	–
NC22	Kathy Vogt	Canada	138.795	45.2 (15)	2:26.19 (28)	1:29.73 (17)	–
NC23	Nancy Swider	United States	138.826	46.0 (25)	2:22.37 (20)	1:30.74 (22)	–
NC24	Sophie Westenbroek	Netherlands	139.058	45.4 (20)	2:24.82 (27)	1:30.77 (23)	–
NC25	Marja Repola	Finland	139.165	45.9 (23)	2:22.65 (22)	1:31.43 (28)	–
NC26	Brenda Webster	Canada	139.248	45.9 (23)	2:23.11 (23)	1:31.29 (27)	–
NC27	Ewa Białkowska	Poland	139.293	45.1 (14)	2:29.56 (29)	1:30.68 (21)	–
NC28	Linda Palle	Sweden	139.773	46.0 (25)	2:24.73 (26)	1:31.06 (25)	–
NC29	Galina Stepanskaya	Soviet Union	141.775	46.4 (28)	2:23.52 (24)	1:35.07 (29)	–
NC30	Kim Ferran	United Kingdom	144.950	47.4 (30)	2:28.56 (30)	1:36.06 (30)	–
NC31	Anje Kremer	New Zealand	158.031	52.0 (31)	2:40.76 (31)	1:44.89 (31)	–

* = Fall

== Attribution ==
In Dutch
