= Kim Sun-ok =

Kim Sun-ok is a Korean name consisting of the family name Kim and the given name Sun-ok or Seon-ok, and may also refer to:

- Kim So-hee (singer, born 1917) (1917–1995), South Korean traditional singer
- Kim Soon-ok (screenwriter) (born 1971), South Korean television writer
- Kim Sun-ok (bobsledder) (born 1980), South Korean bobsledder
- Kim Soon-ok (table tennis), South Korean table tennis player
