= North Korea at the 1972 Winter Olympics =

- IOC code: PRK
- NOC: Olympic Committee of the Democratic People's Republic of Korea

in Sapporo
- Competitors: 6 (women) in 1 sport
- Medals: Gold 0 Silver 0 Bronze 0 Total 0

Winter Olympics appearances (overview)
- 1964; 1968; 1972; 1976–1980; 1984; 1988; 1992; 1994; 1998; 2002; 2006; 2010; 2014; 2018; 2022–2026

Other related appearances
- Korea (2018)

North Korea competed as the Democratic People's Republic of Korea at the 1972 Winter Olympics in Sapporo, Japan.

== Speed skating ==
Women

Event	Athlete	Race	
Event	Athlete	Time	Rank
500 m	Tak In-Suk	55.80 (fall)	28
1000 m	Choi Dong-Ok	1"36.67	27
1000 m	Tak In-Suk	1:35.38	20
1000 m	Han Pil-Hwa	1:33.79	12
1500 m	Kim Myung-Ja	2:32.55	29
1500 m	Han Pil-Hwa	2:25.64	13
1500 m	Kim Bok-Soon	2:25.48	12
3000 m	Kim Ok-Soon	5:09.69	13
3000 m	Kim Bok-Soon	5:07.93	11
3000 m	Han Pil-Hwa	5:07.24	9
