= Lāsma =

- Gender: Female
- Name day: October 1

Origin
- Meaning: sparkle
- Region of origin: Latvia

Lāsma is a Latvian feminine given name. Its name day is October 1.

== Notable people named Lāsma ==
- Lāsma Kauniste (born 1942), Latvian speed skater
- Lāsma Kugrēna (born 1952), Latvian actress
- Lāsma Liepa (born 1988), Latvian-born Turkish sprint kayaker
- Lāsma Zemene (born 1990), Latvian Miss World contestant
