= Jennifer Jackson =

Jennifer Jackson is the name of:

- Jennifer Jackson (model) (born 1945), model and first African-American Playboy playmate, March 1965
- Jennifer Jackson (speed skater) (1952-2015), Canadian Olympic speed skater
- Jennifer Jackson, associate producer of Magic City
- Jennifer Lyn Jackson (1969–2010), model and Playboy playmate, April 1989
- Jen Jackson, co-anchor of Bikini News
