= Stahnke =

Stahnke is a German surname. Notable people with the surname include:

- Angela Stahnke, German speedskater
- Günter Stahnke, German film director
- Herbert Stahnke, American biologist
- Manfred Stahnke, German composer and musicologist
- Susan Stahnke, German TV presenter
- Wayne Stahnke, American inventor of electro-mechanical reproducing pianos manufactured by Bösendorfer and Steinway & Sons
