= World Speed Skating Championships =

- Purpose: World Championships of speed skating
- Frequency: Every year
- Inaugurated: 1893 (official)

The International Skating Union organises the following World Championships in the sport of speed skating:

Sport	Discipline	Championships for:			
Long track	Allround	Men	Women	Junior	
Long track	Sprint	Men	Women		
Long track	Single Distances	Men	Women		
Short track	Short track	Men	Women	Junior	Team

== Records ==
=== World Allround ===
==== Men ====
Skater	1st place, gold medalist(s)	Year	2nd place, silver medalist(s)	3rd place, bronze medalist(s)
(Netherlands) Sven Kramer	9	2007, 2008, 2009, 2010, 2012, 2013, 2015, 2016, 2017	0	3
(Finland) Clas Thunberg	5	1923, 1925, 1928, 1929, 1931	1	1
(Norway) Oscar Mathisen	5	1908, 1909, 1912, 1913, 1914	1	0
(Norway) Ivar Ballangrud	4	1926, 1932, 1936, 1938	4	3
(Netherlands) Rintje Ritsma	4	1995, 1996, 1999, 2001	2	3

Source: SpeedSkatingStats.com

==== Women ====
Skater	1st place, gold medalist(s)	Year	2nd place, silver medalist(s)	3rd place, bronze medalist(s)
(East Germany) / (Germany) Gunda Niemann-Stirnemann (Kleemann)	8	1991, 1992, 1993, 1995, 1996, 1997, 1998, 1999	2	0
(Netherlands) Ireen Wüst	7	2007, 2011, 2012, 2013, 2014, 2017, 2020	4	2
(Czech Republic) Martina Sáblíková	5	2009, 2010, 2015, 2016, 2019	2	1
(East Germany) Karin Kania (Enke, Busch)	5	1982, 1984, 1986, 1987, 1988	2	0
(Soviet Union) Inga Voronina (Artamonova)	4	1957, 1958, 1962, 1965	2	0
(Netherlands) Atje Keulen-Deelstra	4	1970, 1972, 1973, 1974	0	0

Source: SpeedSkatingStats.com

==== Junior ====
Multiple champions (overall classification)
Boys

Skater	1st place, gold medalist(s)	Year	2nd place, silver medalist(s)	3rd place, bronze medalist(s)
(United States) Eric Heiden	2	1977, 1978	1	0
(Netherlands) Koen Verweij	2	2009, 2010	1	0
(Sweden) Tomas Gustafson	2	1979, 1980	0	0
(Soviet Union) Valeri Guk	2	1984, 1985	0	0
(Netherlands) Falko Zandstra	2	1990, 1991	0	0
(Netherlands) Bob de Jong	2	1995, 1996	0	0
(Norway) Sverre Lunde Pedersen	2	2011, 2012	0	0
(Netherlands) Patrick Roest	2	2014, 2015	0	0

Girls

Skater	1st place, gold medalist(s)	Year	2nd place, silver medalist(s)	3rd place, bronze medalist(s)
(East Germany) Angela Stahnke	3	1982, 1983, 1984	0	0
(United States) Beth Heiden	2	1978, 1979	2	0
(East Germany) Monique Garbrecht	2	1986, 1987	0	1
(East Germany) Ulrike Adeberg	2	1989, 1990	0	0
(Netherlands) Frédérique Ankoné	2	2000, 2001	0	0
(Japan) Miho Takagi	2	2012, 2013	0	0
(Netherlands) Femke Kok	2	2019, 2020	0	0
(Netherlands) Angel Daleman	2	2023, 2024	0	0

=== World Sprint ===
==== Men ====
Skater	1st place, gold medalist(s)	Year	2nd place, silver medalist(s)	3rd place, bronze medalist(s)
(Soviet Union) / (Commonwealth of Independent States) / (Belarus) Igor Zhelezovski	6	1985, 1986, 1989, 1991, 1992, 1993	0	1
(Canada) Jeremy Wotherspoon	4	1999, 2000, 2002, 2003	4	1
(South Korea) Lee Kyou-hyuk	4	2007, 2008, 2010, 2011	1	0
(United States) Eric Heiden	4	1977, 1978, 1979, 1980	0	0
(Russia) Pavel Kulizhnikov	3	2015, 2016, 2019	0	0

Source: SpeedSkatingStats.com

==== Women ====
Skater	1st place, gold medalist(s)	Year	2nd place, silver medalist(s)	3rd place, bronze medalist(s)
(East Germany) Karin Kania (Enke, Busch)	6	1980, 1981, 1983, 1984, 1986, 1987	2	0
(Germany) Monique Garbrecht-Enfeldt	5	1991, 1999, 2000, 2001, 2003	0	0
(United States) Bonnie Blair	3	1989, 1994, 1995	4	2
(United States) Sheila Young	3	1973, 1975, 1976	0	0

Source: SpeedSkatingStats.com

=== World Single Distances ===
==== Men ====
Skater	1st place, gold medalist(s)	Year	2nd place, silver medalist(s)	3rd place, bronze medalist(s)
(Netherlands) Sven Kramer	21	5000 m: 2007, 2008, 2009, 2012, 2013, 2015, 2016, 2017; 10000 m: 2007, 2008, 2009, 2016, 2017; Team pursuit: 2007, 2008, 2009, 2012, 2013, 2015, 2019, 2020	3	2
(United States) Shani Davis	8	1000 m: 2007, 2008, 2011, 2015; 1500 m: 2004, 2007, 2009; Team pursuit: 2011	4	3
(Netherlands) Bob de Jong	7	5000 m: 2001, 2011; 10000 m: 1999, 2003, 2005, 2011, 2012	8	5
(Netherlands) Gianni Romme	7	5000 m: 1998, 1999, 2000; 10000 m: 1996, 1997, 1998, 2000	2	3
(Netherlands) Erben Wennemars	6	1000 m: 2003, 2004; 1500 m: 2003; Team pursuit: 2005, 2007, 2008	2	3
(United States) Jordan Stolz	6	500 m: 2023, 2024; 1000 m: 2023, 2024; 1500 m: 2023, 2024	2	1

Source: SpeedSkatingStats.com

==== Women ====
Skater	1st place, gold medalist(s)	Year	2nd place, silver medalist(s)	3rd place, bronze medalist(s)
(Czech Republic) Martina Sáblíková	16	3000 m: 2007, 2012, 2015, 2016, 2019, 2020; 5000 m: 2007, 2008, 2009, 2011, 2012, 2013, 2015, 2016, 2017, 2019	7	4
(Netherlands) Ireen Wüst	15	1000 m: 2007; 1500 m: 2007, 2011, 2013, 2019, 2020; 3000 m: 2011, 2013, 2017; Team pursuit: 2008, 2012, 2013, 2016, 2017, 2021	15	1
(Germany) Anni Friesinger-Postma	12	1000 m: 2003, 2004, 2008; 1500 m: 1998, 2001, 2003, 2004, 2008, 2009; 3000 m: 2003; 5000 m: 2005; Team pursuit: 2005	9	1
(Germany) Gunda Niemann-Stirnemann	11	1500 m: 1997; 3000 m: 1996, 1997, 1998, 1999, 2001; 5000 m: 1997, 1998, 1999, 2000, 2001	3	0
(Netherlands) Irene Schouten	8	3000 m: 2024; 5000 m: 2021, 2023; Mass start: 2015, 2019, 2024; Team pursuit: 2021, 2024	2	5
(Canada) Christine Nesbitt	7	1000 m: 2009, 2011, 2012; 1500 m: 2012; Team pursuit: 2007, 2009, 2011	2	3
(Netherlands) Antoinette Rijpma-de Jong	6	1500 m: 2023; 3000 m: 2021; Team pursuit: 2016, 2017, 2021, 2025	5	2
(Japan) Miho Takagi	6	1000 m: 2024, 2025; 1500 m: 2024; Team pursuit: 2015, 2019, 2020	4	6

Source: SpeedSkatingStats.com

=== World Short Track (Overall) ===
==== Men ====
Skater	1st place, gold medalist(s)	Year	2nd place, silver medalist(s)	3rd place, bronze medalist(s)
(South Korea) Ahn Hyun-soo / (Russia) Viktor An	6	2003, 2004, 2005, 2006, 2007, 2014	1	0
(Canada) Marc Gagnon	4	1993, 1994, 1996, 1998	2	1

==== Women ====
Skater	1st place, gold medalist(s)	Year	2nd place, silver medalist(s)	3rd place, bronze medalist(s)
(China) Yang Yang (A)	6	1997, 1998, 1999, 2000, 2001, 2002	1	0
(Canada) Sylvie Daigle	5	1979, 1983, 1988, 1989, 1990	2	1
(South Korea) Choi Min-jeong	4	2015, 2016, 2018, 2022	1	0
(China) Wang Meng	3	2008, 2009, 2013	3	0
(Canada) Nathalie Lambert	3	1991, 1993, 1994	2	2
(South Korea) Chun Lee-kyung	3	1995, 1996, 1997	2	0
(South Korea) Jin Sun-yu	3	2005, 2006, 2007	0	0

== Combined all-time medal count ==
Updated after the 2026 World Allround Speed Skating Championships.

This table include all medals won at the World Allround Speed Skating Championships (1889–2026), World Sprint Speed Skating Championships (1970–2026) and World Single Distances Speed Skating Championships (1996–2025). Unofficial World Championships (not recognized by the ISU) also included

Rank	Nation	From	To	Gold	Silver	Bronze	Total
1.	Netherlands	1893	2026	191	153	157	501
2.	United States	1891	2026	61	48	59	168
3.	Norway	1898	2026	59	62	63	184
4.	Germany	1991	2020	56	51	39	146
5.	Canada	1897	2025	45	61	56	162
6.	Soviet Union	1948	1991	43	48	38	129
7.	Japan	1970	2026	23	36	44	103
8.	Russia	1910	2020	22	25	35	82
9.	Czech Republic	2007	2026	21	10	8	39
10.	East Germany	1960	1990	20	17	9	46
11.	South Korea	1990	2025	17	16	12	45
12.	Finland	1901	2013	13	16	7	36
13.	China	1991	2026	10	17	11	38
14.	Italy	1991	2025	7	12	8	27
15.	Sweden	1908	2022	7	6	7	20
16.	Austria	1933	2023	4	5	5	14
17.	Belgium	1996	2025	2	2	7	11
18.	West Germany	1971	1982	2	0	3	5
19.	Russian Skating Union	2021	2021	1	3	7	11
20.	Belarus	1993	2005	1	2	2	5
21.	Kazakhstan	1995	2013	1	1	1	3
22.	Latvia	1939	1940	1	1	0	2
23.	CIS	1992	1992	1	0	0	1
23.	Hungary	1949	1949	1	0	0	1
25.	Poland	1978	2026	0	4	11	15
26.	France	1960	2017	0	2	2	4
27.	Great Britain	1951	2023	0	1	1	2
27.	New Zealand	2017	2017	0	1	1	2
29.	North Korea	1966	1966	0	1	0	1
30.	Australia	2014	2014	0	0	1	1
30.	Romania	1994	1994	0	0	1	1
30.	Switzerland	2024	2024	0	0	1	1
-	independent	1951	1951	0	0	1	1
-	none declared	1889	1907	7	18	18	43
Total				609	601	597	1807
