= Seon-ok =

- Hangul: 선옥
- RR: Seonok
- MR: Sŏnok

Seon-ok, also spelled Sun-ok or Son-ok, is a Korean given name.

People with this name include:

- Jeon Seon-ok (born 1951), South Korean speed skater
- Gong Sun-ok (born 1963), South Korean writer
- Kim Sun-ok (bobsledder) (born 1980), South Korean bobsledder
- Lee Seon-ok (born 1981), South Korean field hockey player
- Hong Son-ok (born 1950), North Korean politician, Vice-chairperson of the Supreme People's Assembly

== See also ==
- List of Korean given names
