= Kim Myung-ja =

Kim Myung-ja may refer to:

- Kim Myung-ja (speed skater)
- Kim Myung-ja (politician)
