= Sun-ok =

- Hangul: 순옥
- RR: Sunok
- MR: Sunok

Sun-ok, also spelled Soon-ok, is a Korean given name.

People with this name include:

- Kim So-hee (singer, born 1917) (birth name Kim Sun-ok; 1917–1995), South Korean traditional musician
- O Sun-ok (born 1945), South Korean volleyball player
- Lee Soon-ok (born 1947), North Korean defector and former political prisoner
- Jeon Soon-ok (born 1954), South Korean labour activist and National Assembly member
- Jung Soon-ok (volleyball) (born 1955), South Korean volleyball player
- Lee Soon-ok (volleyball) (born 1955), South Korean volleyball player
- Kim Soon-ok (screenwriter) (born 1971), South Korean screenwriter
- Jung Soon-ok (born 1983), South Korean long jumper
- Kim Soon-ok (table tennis), South Korean table tennis player

== See also ==
- List of Korean given names
- Gong Sun-ok (공선옥; born 1963), South Korean novelist
- Kim Sun-ok (bobsledder) (김선옥; born 1980), South Korean bobsledder
