= Lyubov Sadchikova =

Soviet speed skater

Personal information
- Born: 22 September 1951 Kuybyshev, Russian SFSR, Soviet Union
- Died: 22 November 2012 (aged 61) Smolensk, Russia
- Height: 1.73 m (5 ft 8 in)

Sport
- Sport: Speed skating
- Club: Burevestnik Smolensk
Medal record
Representing the Soviet Union
World Championships
| Gold medal – first place | 1978 Lake Placid | All-round |

Lyubov Ivanovna Sadchikova (Russian: Любовь Ивановна Садчикова; 22 September 1951 – 22 November 2012) was a Soviet speed skater who won the all-round world championship in 1978. In 1975, she set a world record in 500 m. Next year, she finished sixth in the same event at the 1976 Winter Olympics.

She won five national titles in 500 m (1975, 1978) and 1000 m (1974, 1976, 1977) and finished second four times, in all-round (1976, 1974, 1977) and 500 m (1973). In 1974 and 1976 she was third in 500 m. She graduated from an Institute of Physical Education in Samara.

Personal bests:

- 500 m – 40.84 (1978)
- 1000 m – 1:23.80 (1976)
- 1500 m – 2:13.76 (1976)
- 3000 m – 5:02.50 (1976)
