= Ruth Schleiermacher =

German speed skater

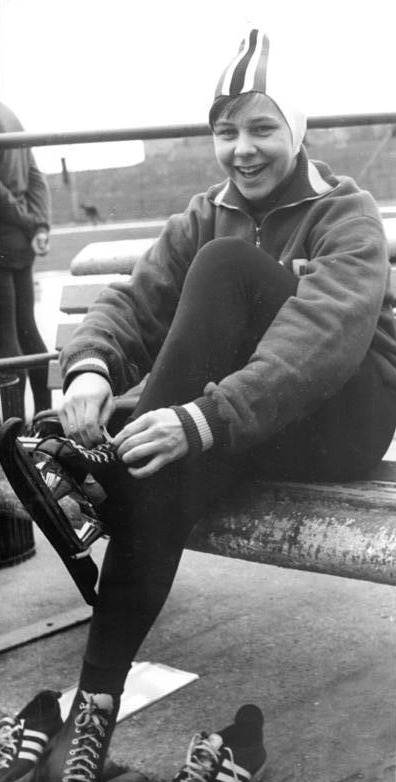

Personal information
- Born: 3 November 1949 (age 76) Wunsiedel, West Germany

Sport
- Country: Germany
- Sport: Speed skating
Medal record
Women's speed skating
Representing East Germany
World Championships
Gold medal – first place	1971 Inzell	Sprint

Ruth Schleiermacher (later Ruth Budzisch-Schleiermacher, born 3 November 1949) is a former East German speedskater. She took part in eight international championships. Twice at the European Championships (1971 and 1972), thrice at the World Allround Championships (1967, 1968 and 1969), once at the World Sprint Championships (1971) and two times at the Winter Olympics, 1968 and 1972.

== Career ==
Schleiermacher was born in Wunsiedel, Bavaria. At her international debut during the Wch Allround of 1967 in Deventer she finished 27th. A year later, during the op het Wch Allround of 1968, she had improved to become 16th. Progress was such that the next year this had become the 4th place overall, while she won a silver distance medal on the 500m. After a year of absence at the big tournaments (though she did become East-German Champion that year), she returned next year, better than ever before. At the World Sprint Championships of 1971 in Inzell Schleiermacher wins her first and only international title, becoming the successor of Lyudmila Titova from the Soviet Union.

== World records ==
Over the course of her career, Schleiermacher skated one official world record:

Event	Result	Date	Venue
500 m	44.6	4 February 1969	Davos

Note that her best score on the sprint combination was skated before there was an official world record for that event. It was a world best performance at that time though.

== Personal records ==
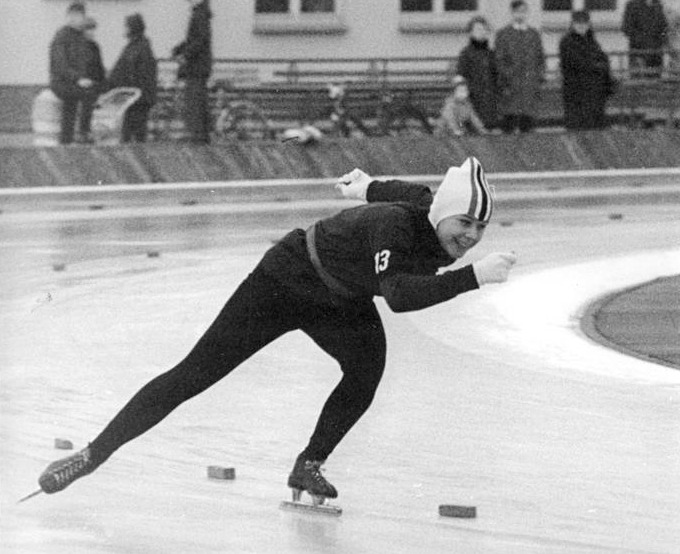
Schleiermacher at the DDR-Championships of 1969

To put these personal records in perspective, the column WR lists the official world records on the dates that Schleiermacher skated her personal records.

Event	Result	Date	Venue	WR
500 m	43.15	20 February 1971	Inzell	42.91
1000 m	1:28.9	21 February 1971	Inzell	1:27.7
1500 m	2:22.15	15 January 1972	Inzell	2:15.8
3000 m	5:08.7	2 February 1969	Grenoble	4:52.0
Mini combination	191.458	15 January 1972	Inzell	182.805
Sprint combination	175.730	21 February 1971	Inzell	no WR yet
