= Shin Mi-hwa =

South Korean bobsledder

Shin Mi-Hwa
Personal information
- Nationality: South Korean
- Born: 3 May 1994 (age 31) Geochang County, South Korea
- Height: 1.66 m (5 ft 5 in)
- Weight: 64 kg (141 lb)

Sport
- Country: South Korea
- Sport: Bobsleigh

Shin Mi-Hwa (born May 3, 1994 in Geochang County) is a South Korean bobsledder.

Shin competed at the 2014 Winter Olympics for South Korea. She teamed with Kim Sun-ok in the two-woman event, finishing 18th.

Shin made her World Cup debut in December 2013. As of April 2014, her best World Cup finish is 20th, at a pair of events in 2013-14.
