= Geochang County =

Coordinates: 35°41′N 127°54′E

Geochang
- County
- Panoramic view of Geochang-eup

- Flag Emblem of Geochang

- Location in South Korea
- Country: South Korea
- Region: Yeongnam
- Administrative divisions: 1 eup, 11 myeon

Area
  - Total: 804.09 km^{2} (310.46 sq mi)

Population (September 2024)
  - Total: 59,737
  - Density: 77.5/km^{2} (201/sq mi)
  - Dialect: Gyeongsang

Korean name
- Hangul: 거창군
- Hanja: 居昌郡
- RR: Geochang-gun
- MR: Kŏch'ang-gun

Geochang County (Korean: 거창군; [kʌtɕʰaŋɡun]) is a county in South Gyeongsang Province, South Korea. The Geochang International Festival of Theater, which was started in 1989, is renowned as the best play festival in Korea. The District Office is located in Geochang-eup, and has jurisdiction over 1 eup and 11 myeon.

== The origin of Geochang's name ==
Geochang County has been called Geoyeol, Geota and Arim since ancient times, in the meaning of a large bright place, a very wide field, a wide field, or a large bright one. It was first called a Geochang in the 16th year of King Gyeongdeok of Silla in 757 and was called a geochang after being divided and annexed by surrounding cities.

== History ==
- At the beginning of the Shilla Dynasty was referred to as Gayeol.
- 1896 Gyeongsangnam-do, Geochang-gun
- 1928 Gadong-myeon and Gaseo-myeon consolidated into Gajo-myeon.
- 1931 Eupwoe-myeon renamed to Wolcheon-myeon.
- 1937 Geochang-myeon elevated to Geochang-eup.
- 1957 Wolcheon-myeon consolidated into Geochang-eup.

== Festivals ==
- Keochang International Festival of Theatre (KIFT)

In Korea, it is called the four major theatrical festivals along with Ansan Street Arts Festival, Puppet Festival Chuncheon, and Andong Maskdance Festival.

It is an international theater festival that is held every July and August under the theme of "Nature, Humanity, and Drama".

== Twin towns and districts ==
Geochang is twinned with:

- Gokseong, South Korea (1998)
- Gangdong-gu, South Korea (1999)
- Gaoyou, China (2005)
- Yeongdo-gu, South Korea (2006)
- Suseong-gu, South Korea (2006)
- Seocho-gu, South Korea (2007)

== Climate ==
Geochang has a humid continental climate (Köppen: Dwa), but can be considered a borderline humid subtropical climate (Köppen: Cwa) using the −3 °C (27 °F) isotherm.

Climate data for Geochang (1991–2020 normals, extremes 1972–present)
Month	Jan	Feb	Mar	Apr	May	Jun	Jul	Aug	Sep	Oct	Nov	Dec	Year
Record high °C (°F)	15.5 (59.9)	22.9 (73.2)	26.4 (79.5)	30.8 (87.4)	34.6 (94.3)	35.7 (96.3)	38.1 (100.6)	37.1 (98.8)	34.5 (94.1)	30.1 (86.2)	26.7 (80.1)	19.7 (67.5)	38.1 (100.6)
Mean daily maximum °C (°F)	5.4 (41.7)	8.1 (46.6)	13.3 (55.9)	19.5 (67.1)	24.5 (76.1)	27.4 (81.3)	29.5 (85.1)	29.9 (85.8)	25.9 (78.6)	21.0 (69.8)	14.3 (57.7)	7.5 (45.5)	18.9 (66.0)
Daily mean °C (°F)	−1.3 (29.7)	0.9 (33.6)	5.9 (42.6)	11.9 (53.4)	17.1 (62.8)	21.2 (70.2)	24.3 (75.7)	24.4 (75.9)	19.4 (66.9)	12.8 (55.0)	6.5 (43.7)	0.5 (32.9)	12.0 (53.6)
Mean daily minimum °C (°F)	−7.3 (18.9)	−5.5 (22.1)	−1.0 (30.2)	4.4 (39.9)	9.8 (49.6)	15.7 (60.3)	20.3 (68.5)	20.4 (68.7)	14.5 (58.1)	6.4 (43.5)	0.1 (32.2)	−5.4 (22.3)	6.0 (42.8)
Record low °C (°F)	−18.9 (−2.0)	−16.8 (1.8)	−12.1 (10.2)	−5.7 (21.7)	−0.3 (31.5)	4.8 (40.6)	10.5 (50.9)	8.7 (47.7)	2.7 (36.9)	−5.1 (22.8)	−11.0 (12.2)	−15.8 (3.6)	−18.9 (−2.0)
Average precipitation mm (inches)	23.7 (0.93)	34.1 (1.34)	55.4 (2.18)	84.8 (3.34)	88.7 (3.49)	149.4 (5.88)	286.2 (11.27)	285.3 (11.23)	166.2 (6.54)	60.8 (2.39)	37.8 (1.49)	22.3 (0.88)	1,294.7 (50.97)
Average precipitation days (≥ 0.1 mm)	5.4	5.3	7.5	8.4	8.6	9.7	14.7	14.3	8.9	5.4	6.1	5.4	99.7
Average snowy days	5.6	4.5	2.6	0.2	0.0	0.0	0.0	0.0	0.0	0.0	1.2	3.9	18.2
Average relative humidity (%)	62.3	59.1	58.5	58.8	64.3	71.7	79.7	80.3	78.2	73.4	69.0	64.8	68.3
Mean monthly sunshine hours	190.6	192.3	214.0	225.5	241.7	190.5	164.9	168.4	161.1	187.5	171.3	180.8	2,288.6
Percentage possible sunshine	62.0	62.5	58.3	59.4	56.1	46.6	39.8	43.8	46.2	57.3	56.5	60.1	53.3
Source: Korea Meteorological Administration (snow and percent sunshine 1981–2010)

== Geography ==
- Geochang-gun is situated at the far west side of Gyeongsangnam-do, and faces Gyeongsangbuk-do and Jeollanam-do. It does not have good transportation access.

== Administrative divisions ==
Geochang-gun is made up of Geochang-eup and 11 myeon. With an area of 804.14 km^{2}, it occupies 7.65% of Gyeongsangnam-do. As of August 2012, it has a population of 27,111 households, or 63,122 people, with 62.4% residing in Geochang-eup. Its highest ever population was 125,995, which was much higher than present day Changwon-si.

Eup/myeon	Hanja	Number of households	Population	Area
Geochang-eup	居昌邑	16,536	40,746	56.00
Jusang-myeon	主尙面	857	1,655	50.01
Ungyang-myeon	熊陽面	1,016	2,026	58.47
Goje-myeon	高梯面	807	1,560	58.47
Buksang-myeon	北上面	876	1,652	125.30
Wicheon-myeon	渭川面	1,096	2,162	54.75
Mari-myeon	馬利面	1,166	2,150	46.62
Namsang-myeon	南上面	1,324	2,613	68.51
Namha-myeon	南下面	828	1,528	49.83
Sinwon-myeon	神院面	886	1,590	73.71
Gajo-myeon	加祚面	2,039	3,920	66.15
Gabuk-myeon	加北面	831	1,455	96.25
Geochang-gun	居昌郡	28,262	63,057	804.07

== Notable people from Geochang County ==
- Shin Yong-Mok (신용목), South Korean poet
- Choi Ri (최리), South Korean actress
- Shin Mi-hwa (신미화), South Korean bobsledder
- Kim Tae-ho (김태호), South Korean politician
- Shin Dalja (신달자), South Korean poet
- V (Real Name: Kim Tae-hyung, 김태형), singer-songwriter, member of K-pop boygroup BTS (Originally from Seo-gu, Daegu, South Korea)

== See also ==
- Geochang massacre
