= Vladimir Komarov (speed skater) =

Russian speed skater

Personal information
- Born: 5 January 1949 Moscow, Russian SFSR, Soviet Union
- Died: 23 July 2018 (aged 69)
- Height: 1.86 m (6 ft 1 in)
- Weight: 84 kg (185 lb)

Sport
- Sport: Speed skating

Vladimir Dmitriyevich Komarov (Russian: Владимир Дмитриевич Комаров; 5 January 1949 – 23 July 2018) was a Russian speed skater. He competed at the 1972 Winter Olympics in the 500 m and finished in 14th place. After retiring from competitions he graduated from an institute of physical education in Moscow Oblast (1979) and worked as a speed skating coach. He was the head coach of the Moscow team in the 1980s (particularly in 1979, 1982 and 1986). He was the president of the Russian Speed Skating Federation and a member of the national Olympic committee. He married Natalya Petrusyova, a Soviet Olympic speed skater.

Personal bests:

- 500 m – 38.56 (1975)
- 1000 m – 1:18.80 (1975)
- 1500 m – 2:11.0 (1970)
- 5000 m – 8:17.3 (1969)
- 10000 m –17:14.5 (1968)
