= Monika Pflug =

German speed skater

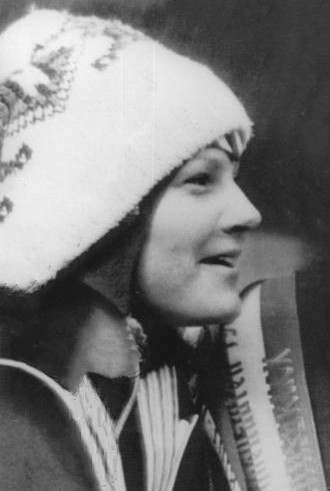
- Pflug at the 1974 World Championships

Personal information
- Born: 1 March 1954 (age 72) Munich, West Germany
- Height: 173 cm (5 ft 8 in)
- Weight: 64 kg (141 lb)

Sport
- Sport: Speed skating
- Club: DEC Frillensee, Inzell

Achievements and titles
- Personal best(s): 500 m – 40.53 (1988); 1000 m – 1:23.47 (1984); 1500 m – 2:11.26 (1986); 3000 m – 4:54.49 (1981)
Medal record
Representing West Germany
Olympic Games
Gold medal – first place	1972 Sapporo	1000 m
World Championships
Gold medal – first place	1972 Eskilstuna	Sprint
Bronze medal – third place	1973 Oslo	Sprint
Bronze medal – third place	1974 Innsbruck	Sprint
Bronze medal – third place	1982 Alkmaar	Sprint

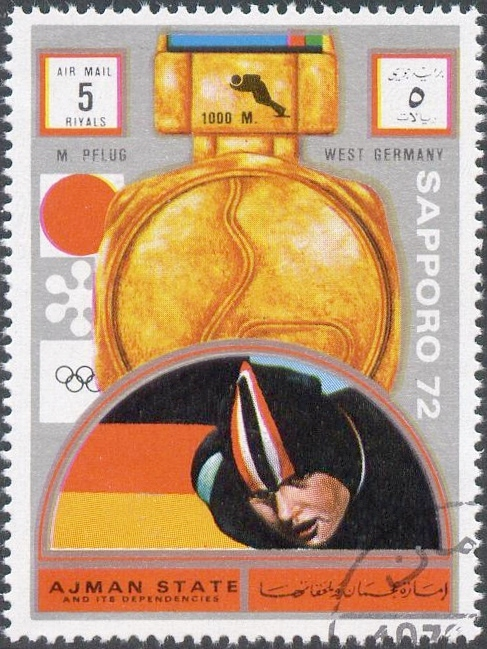
Pflug on a stamp of Ajman

Monika Pflug (born 1 March 1954), also known as Monika Holzner-Pflug and Monika Gawenus-Pflug, is a German former speed skater. She was born in Munich and competed for West Germany.

Pflug's talent for speed skating was discovered in 1968 and the very next year, she already became junior national champion. In 1970, she set a national record on the 1000 m and in 1971, she became national sprint champion. The next year, 1972, was her best year; she first became national allround champion, then, one month later, she won gold on the 1000 m at the 1972 Winter Olympics of Sapporo, and two weeks after that, she became world sprint champion.

After getting married, Pflug started competing as Monika Holzner-Pflug in the 1974–75 season. The marriage was short-lived, however, and after her divorce she competed as Monika Pflug again. In 1984, Pflug married fellow speed skater Fritz Gawenus, a multiple national champion. From then on, she competed as Monika Gawenus-Pflug.

Pflug would compete in a total of five Winter Olympics between 1972 and 1988, but did not win any more Olympic medals. At the World Sprint Championships, she won three more medals, all bronze, in 1973, 1974 and 1982. She interrupted her speed-skating career for a while to become a mother. Pflug ended her speed-skating career abruptly in 1988 after a new personal and national record on the 500 m in an otherwise disappointing season. By that time, she had gathered 16 national titles and had skated a national record 65 times.

== Medals ==
An overview of medals won by Pflug at important championships she participated in, listing the years in which she won each:

Championships	Gold medal	Silver medal	Bronze medal
Winter Olympics	1972 (1000 m)	–	–
World Allround	–	–	–
World Sprint	1972	–	1973; 1974; 1982
World Cup	–	–	–
European Allround	–	–	–
West German Allround	1971; 1972; 1973; 1974; 1975; 1976; 1981; 1982	–	–
West German Sprint	1975; 1979; 1981; 1982; 1983; 1984; 1986; 1987	–	–

== World records ==
Over the course of her career, Pflug skated one world record:

Event	Result	Date	Venue
Sprint combination	183.085	27 February 1972	Eskilstuna

== Personal records ==
To put these personal records in perspective, the column WR lists the official world records on the dates that Pflug skated her personal records.

Event	Result	Date	Venue	WR
500 m	40.53	22 February 1988	Calgary	39.39
1000 m	1:23.47	30 December 1983	Inzell	1:19.31
1500 m	2:11.26	6 March 1986	Inzell	2:03.34
3000 m	4:54.49	26 February 1981	Inzell	4:31.00
Mini combination	178.959	26 February 1981	Inzell	171.149
Sprint combination	166.575	23 February 1986	Karuizawa	161.120
