= Lāsma Kugrēna =

Latvian actress

Lāsma Kugrēna (born 1952 in Bauska) is a Latvian actress.

== Theatre credits ==
Year	Production	Location	Role	Notes
2016	Svina garša	Latvian National Theatre		Based on the novel by Māris Bērziņš
2015	Vīnes meža stāsti (Tales from the Vienna Wood)	Latvian National Theatre	Māte	Written by Ödön von Horváth
2014	Spoki	Latvian National Theatre	Helēna Alvinga	Written by Henrik Ibsen
