= Dianne Holum =

American speed skater

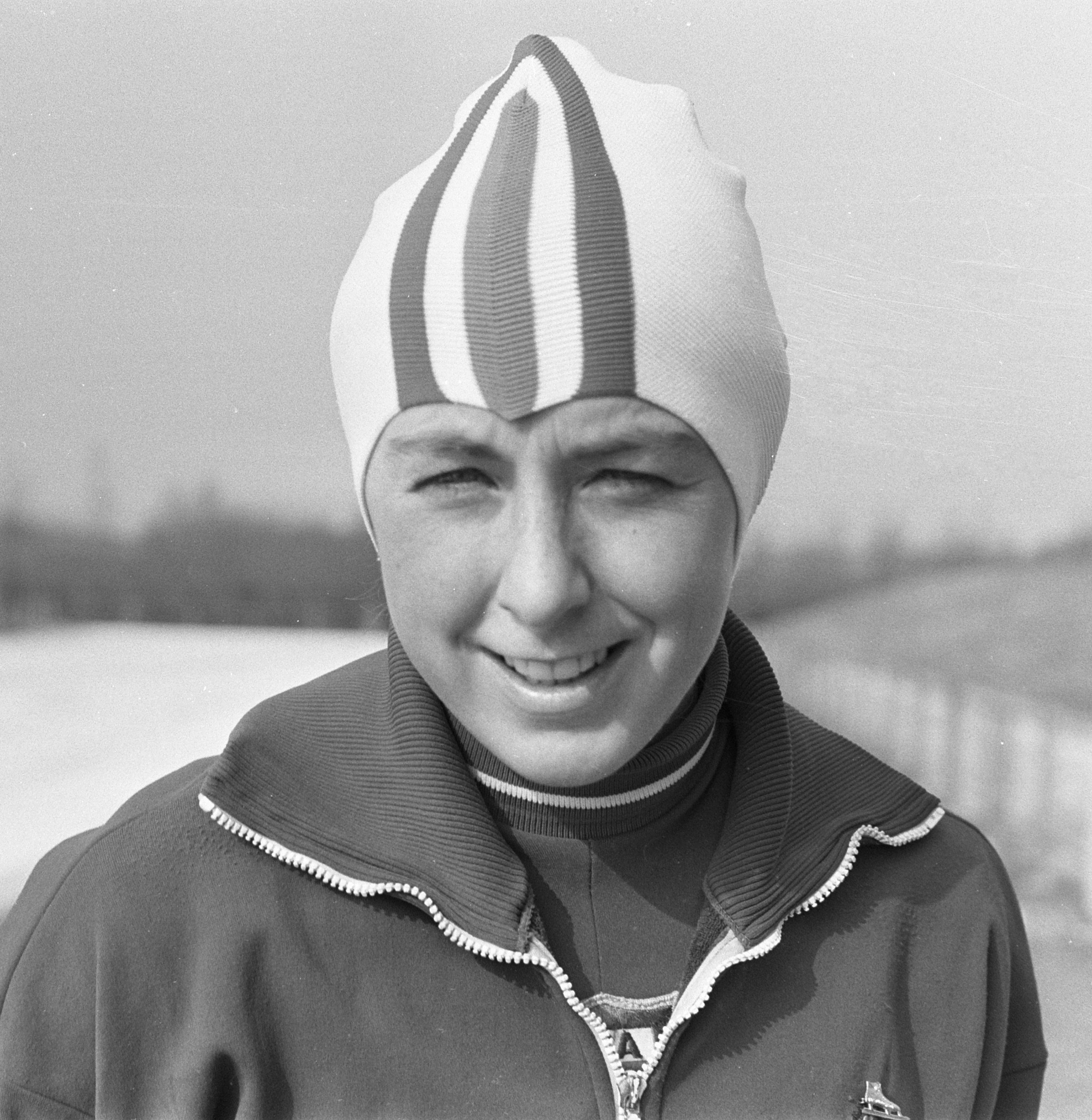
- Holum in 1972

Personal information
- Born: May 19, 1951 (age 75) Chicago, Illinois, U.S.
- Height: 1.67 m (5 ft 6 in)
- Weight: 56 kg (123 lb)

Sport
- Sport: Speed skating
- Club: Northbrook Speedskating Club

Achievements and titles
- Personal best(s): 500 m – 43.59 (1972); 1000 m – 1:28.7 (1972); 1500 m – 2:18.51 (1972); 3000 m – 4:57.9 (1972)
Medal record
Representing the United States
Olympic Games
Silver medal – second place	1968 Grenoble	500 m
Bronze medal – third place	1968 Grenoble	1000 m
Gold medal – first place	1972 Sapporo	1500 m
Silver medal – second place	1972 Sapporo	3000 m
World Championships
Bronze medal – third place	1967 Deventer	Allround
Bronze medal – third place	1971 Inzell	Sprint
Silver medal – second place	1972 Eskilstuna	Sprint
Bronze medal – third place	1972 Heerenveen	Allround

Dianne Mary Holum (born May 19, 1951) is a retired American speed skater.

In 1966, Holum became the youngest person to compete in the world speed skating championships. The next year, she won bronze at the World Allround Championships. At the age of 16, Holum earned a silver medal in the 500 meter race at the 1968 Winter Olympics, finishing in a three-way tie for second place. Holum added a bronze medal in the 1000 meter event.

At the 1972 Winter Olympics, Holum won a gold medal in the 1500 meter event, setting an Olympic record in the process. After finishing sixth in the 1000 meter race, Holum ended her Olympic career by winning a silver medal on the 3000 meters.

After winning bronze once more at the World Allround Championships later that same year, Holum retired from speed skating, only 20 years old. The following year, she began her career as a coach, helping put a 14-year-old Eric Heiden on the road to the 1980 Winter Olympics, where he won five gold medals. She also coached Eric's sister Beth Heiden. At the 1976 Olympics, she became the first female coach to a female speed skater.

For her achievements as a speed skater, Holum was inducted in the National Speedskating Hall of Fame in 1986. For her achievements as a coach, Holum was inducted in the International Women's Sports Hall of Fame in 1996. She also coached her daughter Kirstin Holum, who was Junior World Allround Champion in 1997 and participated in the 1998 Winter Olympics.

Olympic Games
Preceded by Janice Romary	Flagbearer for United States; Sapporo 1972	Succeeded by Olga Fikotová
