= Natalya Petrusyova =

Soviet speed skater (1955–2025)

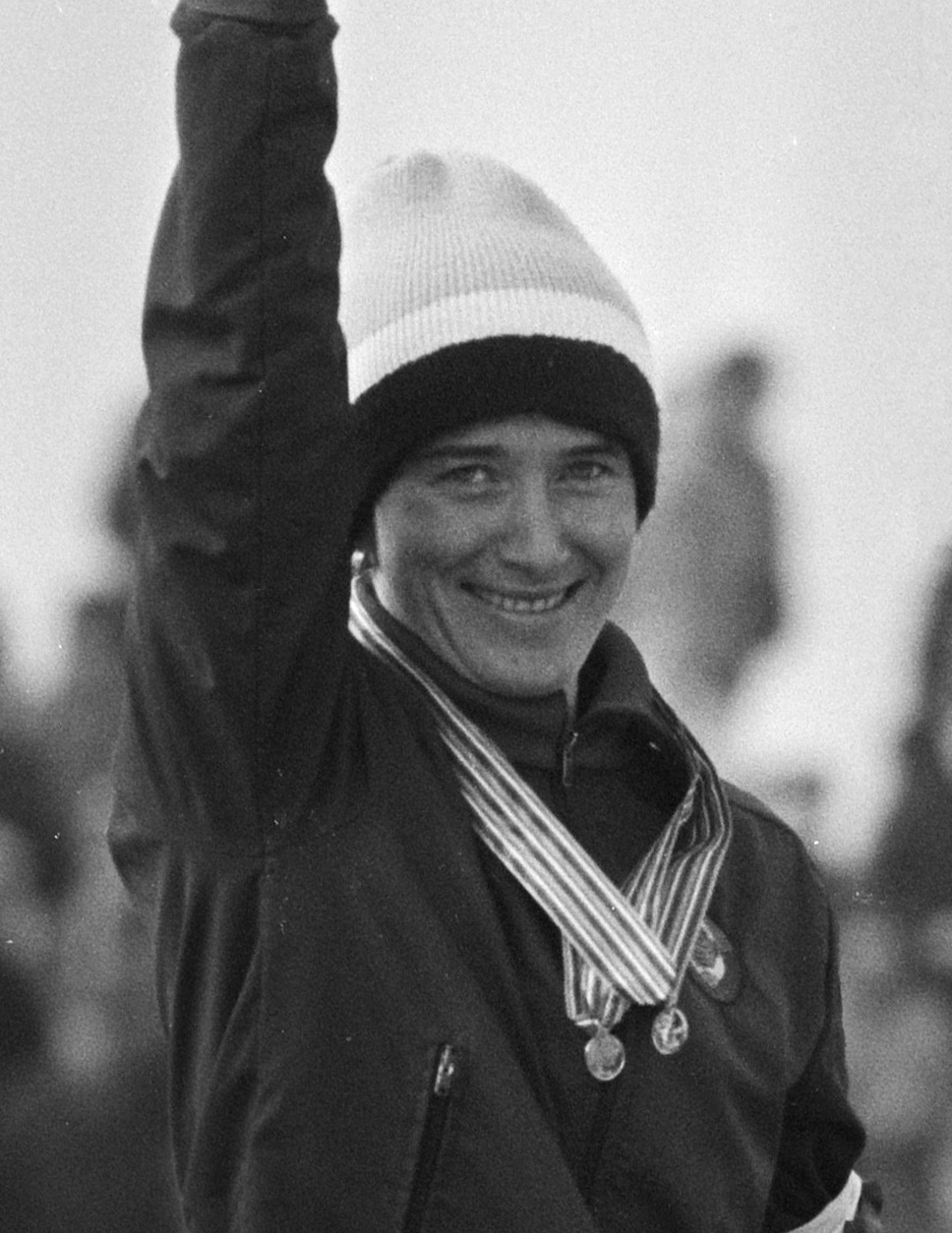
- Petrusyova in 1982

Personal information
- Full name: Natalya Anatolyevna Petrusyova
- Born: 2 September 1955 Pavlovsky Posad, Moscow Oblast, Russian SFSR, USSR
- Died: 28 November 2025 (aged 70)
- Height: 1.62 m (5 ft 4 in)
- Weight: 61 kg (134 lb)

Sport
- Sport: Speed skating
- Club: Burevestnik Moscow
Medal record
Women's speed skating
Representing Soviet Union
Olympic Games
Gold medal – first place	1980 Lake Placid	1,000 m
Bronze medal – third place	1980 Lake Placid	500 m
Bronze medal – third place	1984 Sarajevo	1,000 m
Bronze medal – third place	1984 Sarajevo	1,500 m
World Allround Championships
Gold medal – first place	1980 Hamar	Allround
Gold medal – first place	1981 Sainte-Foy	Allround
Silver medal – second place	1979 The Hague	Allround
Bronze medal – third place	1982 Inzell	Allround

Natalya Anatolyevna Petrusyova (Russian: Ната́лья Анато́льевна Петрусёва; 2 September 1955 – 28 November 2025) was a Russian speed skater.

== Biography ==
Natalya Petrusyova trained at Burevestnik. Competing for the Soviet Union, Petrusyova was a very successful skater – once Olympic Champion (on the 1,000 m), twice World Allround Champion, once World Sprint Champion, twice European Allround Champion, three times Soviet Allround Champion, twice Soviet Sprint Champion, and ten-time world record holder.

She was awarded the Order of Friendship of Peoples in 1980. After her speed skating career had ended, Petrusyova became the senior speed skating coach at the Committee for Physical Culture and Sports in Moscow. At the 2006 Winter Olympics in Turin, she was the senior coach of the Russian speed skating team.

Petrusyova married Vladimir Komarov, a Soviet Olympic speed skater. She died on 28 November 2025, at the age of 70.

== Medals ==
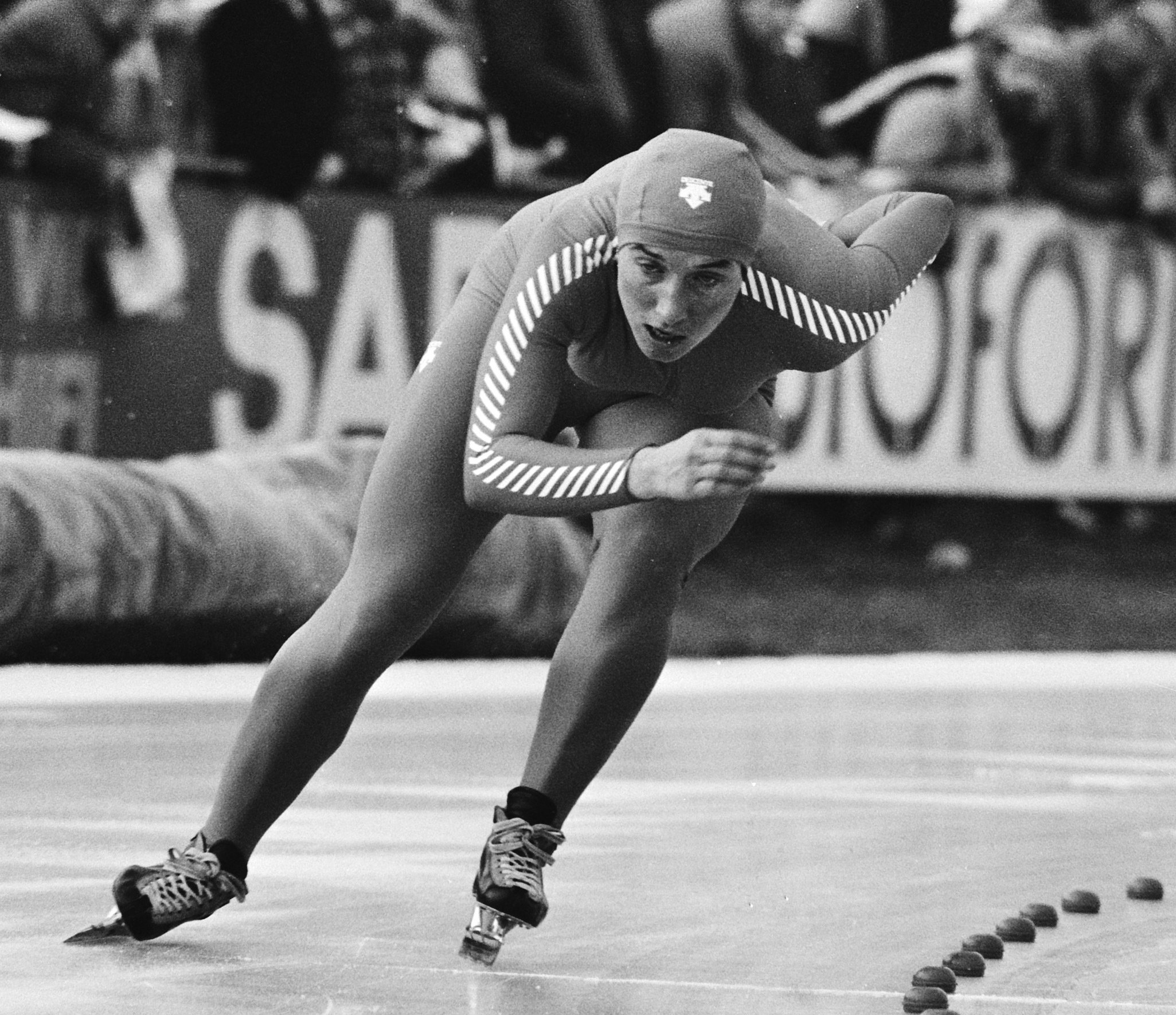
Natalya Petrusyova in 1983

An overview of medals won by Petrusyova at important championships she participated in, listing the years in which she won each:

Championships	Gold medal	Silver medal	Bronze medal
Winter Olympics	1980 (1,000 m)	–	1980 (500 m); 1984 (1,000 m); 1984 (1,500 m)
World Allround	1980; 1981	1979	1982
World Sprint	1982	1983	1981
European Allround	1981; 1982	–	1983
Soviet Allround	1980; 1981; 1982	–	1979
Soviet Sprint	1980; 1981	1979; 1984	–

== World records ==
Over the course of her career, Petrusyova skated ten world records:

Event	Result	Date	Venue
1,000 m	1:23.01	27 March 1980	Medeo
Mini combination	173.434	27 March 1980	Medeo
1,500 m	2:06.01	3 January 1981	Medeo
Mini combination	171.149	4 January 1981	Medeo
1,500 m	2:05.39	27 March 1981	Medeo
1,000 m	1:20.81	28 March 1981	Medeo
1,500 m	2:04.04	25 March 1983	Medeo
1,000 m	1:19.31	26 March 1983	Medeo
Mini combination	168.271	26 March 1983	Medeo
Mini combination	166.682	28 March 1983	Medeo

== Personal records ==
Event	Result	Date	Venue
500 m	40.51	24 March 1984	Medeo
1,000 m	1:19.31	26 March 1983	Medeo
1,500 m	2:04.04	28 March 1983	Medeo
3,000 m	4:29.31	26 December 1980	Medeo
5,000 m	7:51.8	23 August 1981	Leningrad
