= Nataliya Kurova =

Russian speed skater

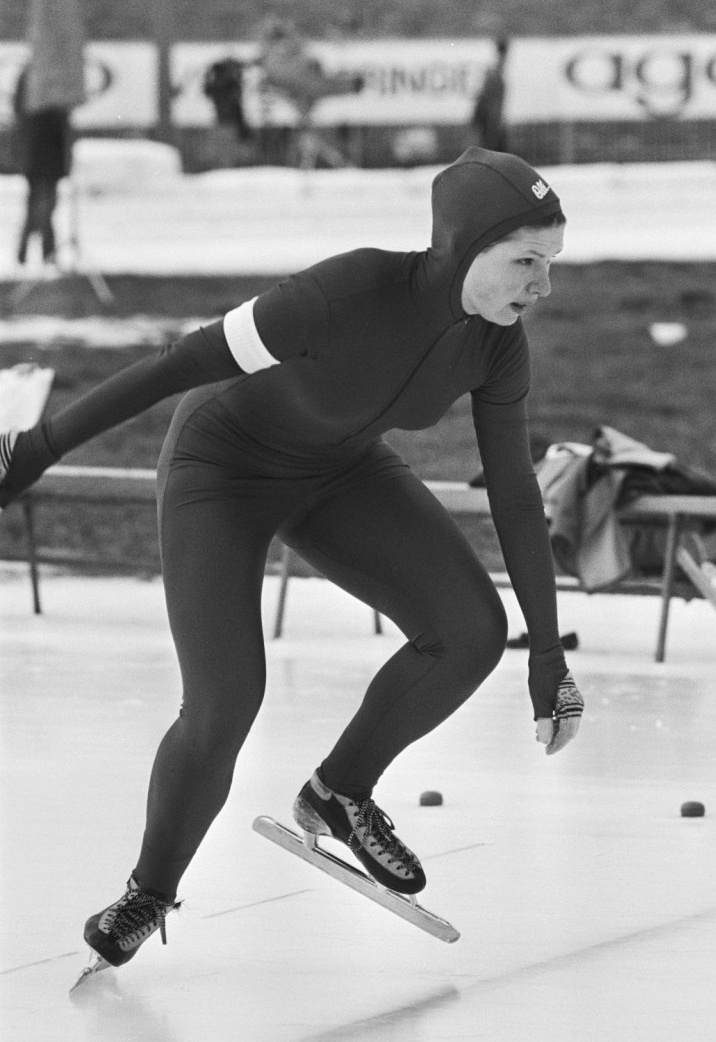
- Nataliya Kurova in 1980

Personal information
- Born: 22 April 1962 (age 64) Moscow, Russian SFSR, Soviet Union
- Height: 1.72 m (5 ft 8 in)
- Weight: 66 kg (146 lb)

Sport
- Sport: Speed skating
- Club: Dynamo

Nataliya Kurova (later Artamonova; Russian: Наталья Курова (-Артамонова); born 22 April 1962) is a retired Russian speed skater who won a bronze medal at the European Speed Skating Championships in 1986. She also competed at the 1984 Winter Olympics in the 1500 m and finished in seventh place.

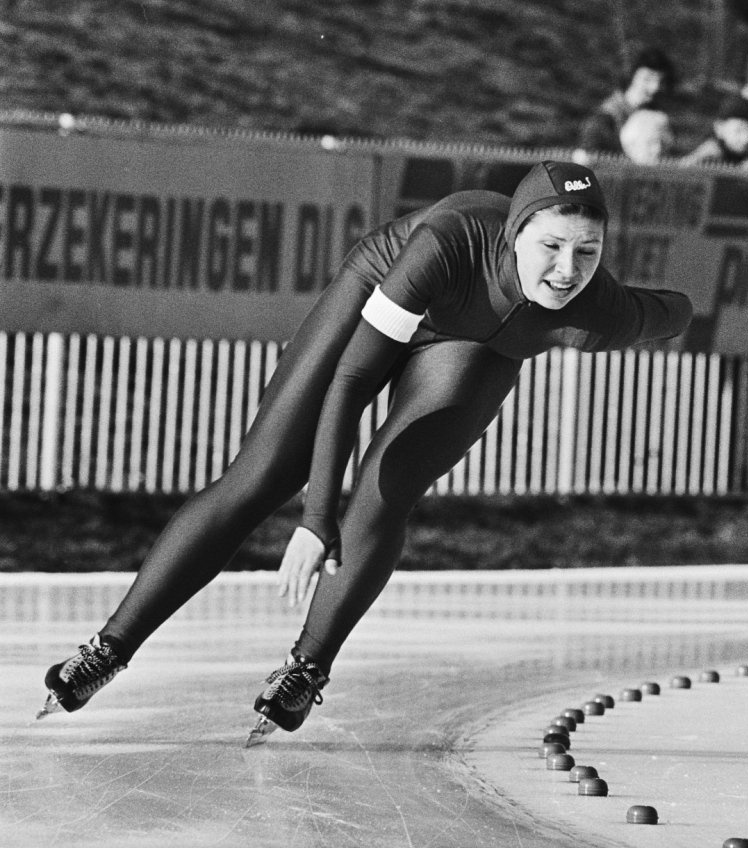
Kurova at the Junior World Championships in Assen in 1980

Personal bests:

- 500 m – 41.22 (1986)
- 1000 m – 1:21.05 (1987)
- 1500 m – 2:07.98 (1988)
- 3000 m – 4:30.79 (1986)
- 5000 m – 7:59.11 (1987)
