= Choi Dong-ok =

North Korean speed skater (born 1950)

Personal information
- Nationality: North Korean
- Born: 29 August 1950 (age 74)

Sport
- Sport: Speed skating

Choi Dong-ok (Korean: 최동옥; Hanja: 崔東玉, born 29 August 1950) is a North Korean speed skater. She competed in the women's 1000 metres at the 1972 Winter Olympics.
