= Jennifer Jackson (speed skater) =

Canadian speed skater

Personal information
- Born: 30 January 1952 Winnipeg, Manitoba, Canada
- Died: 8 August 2015 (aged 63) Winnipeg, Manitoba, Canada

Sport
- Sport: Speed skating

Jennifer Jackson (30 January 1952 – 8 August 2015) was a Canadian speed skater. She competed in the women's 1500 metres at the 1972 Winter Olympics.
