= Akiko Aruga =

Japanese speed skater (born 1942)

Personal information
- Nationality: Japanese
- Born: 16 January 1942 (age 84) Koumi, Nagano, Japan

Sport
- Sport: Speed skating

Akiko Aruga (有賀 秋子, Aruga Akiko; born 16 January 1942) is a Japanese speed skater. She competed in the women's 3000 metres at the 1972 Winter Olympics.
