= 2020 World Sprint Speed Skating Championships =

International speed skating competition

- Location: Hamar, Norway
- Venue: Vikingskipet
- Dates: 28–29 February

The 2020 World Sprint Speed Skating Championships were held at the Vikingskipet in Hamar, Norway, from 28 to 29 February 2020.

== Schedule ==
All times are local (UTC+1).

Date	Time	Event
28 February	17:30	500 m women
28 February	18:07	500 m men
28 February	18:53	1000 m women
28 February	19:46	1000 m men
29 February	10:30	500 m women
29 February	11:07	500 m men
29 February	13:08	1000 m women
29 February	13:59	1000 m men

== Medal summary ==
=== Medal table ===
Rank	Nation	Gold	Silver	Bronze	Total
1	Japan	2	1	0	3
2	Canada	0	1	0	1
3	Russia	0	0	1	1
3	South Korea	0	0	1	1
Totals (4 entries)		2	2	2	6

=== Medalists ===
Event	Gold		Silver		Bronze	
Men	Tatsuya Shinhama; Japan	137.465	Laurent Dubreuil; Canada	137.700	Cha Min-kyu; South Korea	138.425
Women	Miho Takagi; Japan	148.870	Nao Kodaira; Japan	150.150	Olga Fatkulina; Russia	150.430
