= Wil Burgmeijer =

Dutch speed skater

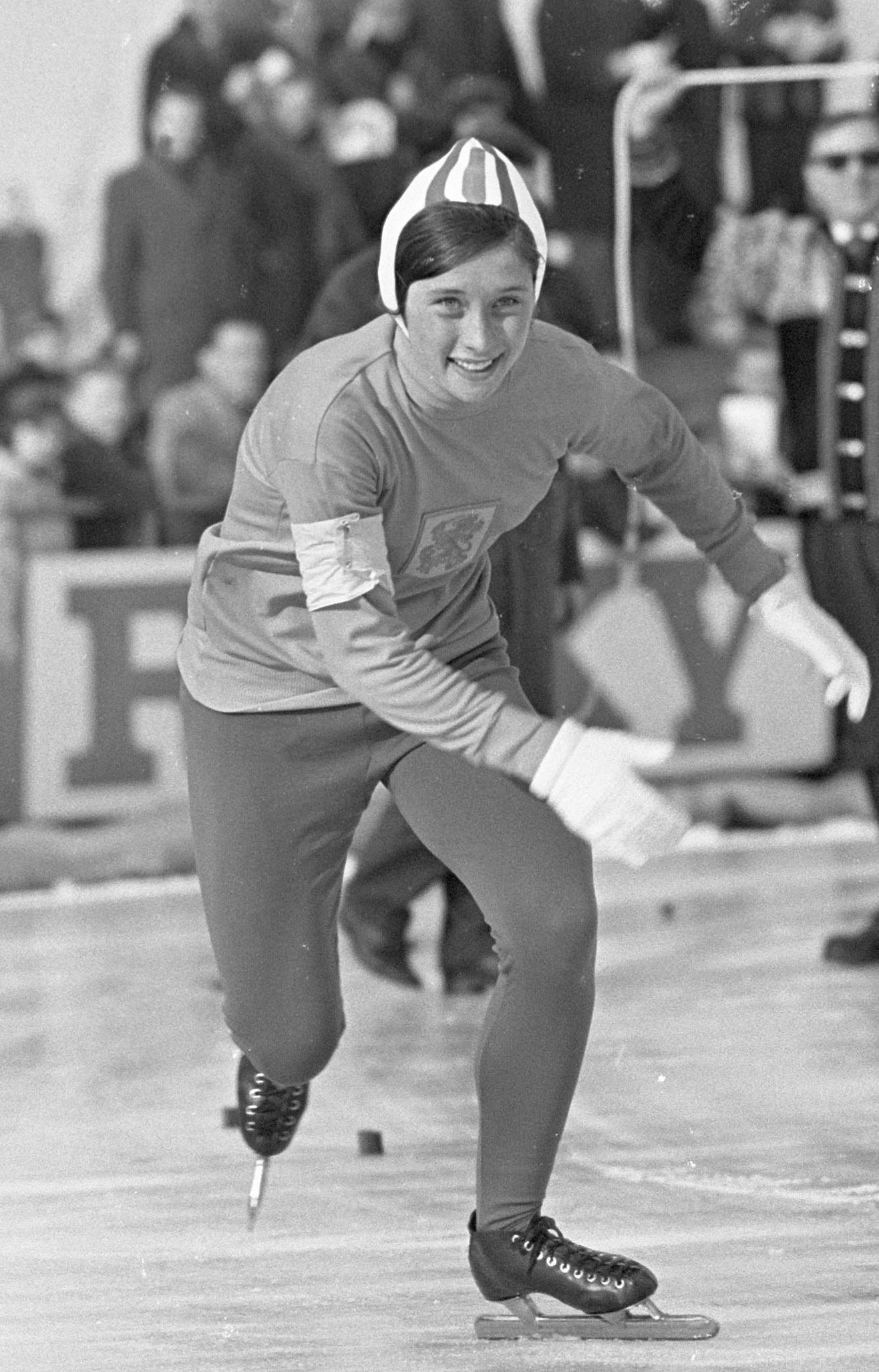
- Wil Burgmeijer in 1967

Personal information
- Born: 23 April 1947 (age 79) Ter Aar, Netherlands
- Height: 1.65 m (5 ft 5 in)
- Weight: 60 kg (130 lb)

Sport
- Sport: Speed skating

Wilhelmina Maria "Wil" Burgmeijer (born 23 April 1947) is a retired Dutch speed skater who won the bronze allround medal at the 1962 world championships. She competed at the 1968 Winter Olympics in 500 m and 3,000 m and finished fifth in the latter event.

Personal bests:

- 500 m – 44.9 (1970)
- 1000 m – 1:31.93 (1972)
- 1500 m – 2:19.96 (1972)
- 3000 m – 4:55.1 (1969)
