= Kim Ok-soon =

North Korean speed skater (born 1949)

Personal information
- Nationality: North Korean
- Born: 2 February 1949 (age 77)

Sport
- Sport: Speed skating

Kim Ok-soon (Korean: 김옥순; born 2 February 1949) is a former North Korean speed skater. She represented her nation between 1968 and 1972 at international competitions.

Kim Ok-soon competed at the World Allround Speed Skating Championships for Women in 1968, finishing 25th overall. In April 1970 she started in three events at the 1970 Winter Universiade, with her best result being a fourth-place finish in the 1000m. She competed in the women's 3000 metres at the 1972 Winter Olympics.

== Records ==
=== Personal records ===
Personal records
Women's speed skating
Event	Result	Date	Location	Notes
500 m	48,10	14 March 1969	Sverdlovsk	
1000 m	1.37,80	15 March 1969	Sverdlovsk	
1500 m	2.25,80	25 December 1969	Bujen	
3000 m	5.07,20	17 January 1970	Heisan	
