= Lāsma Kauniste =

Latvian speed skater

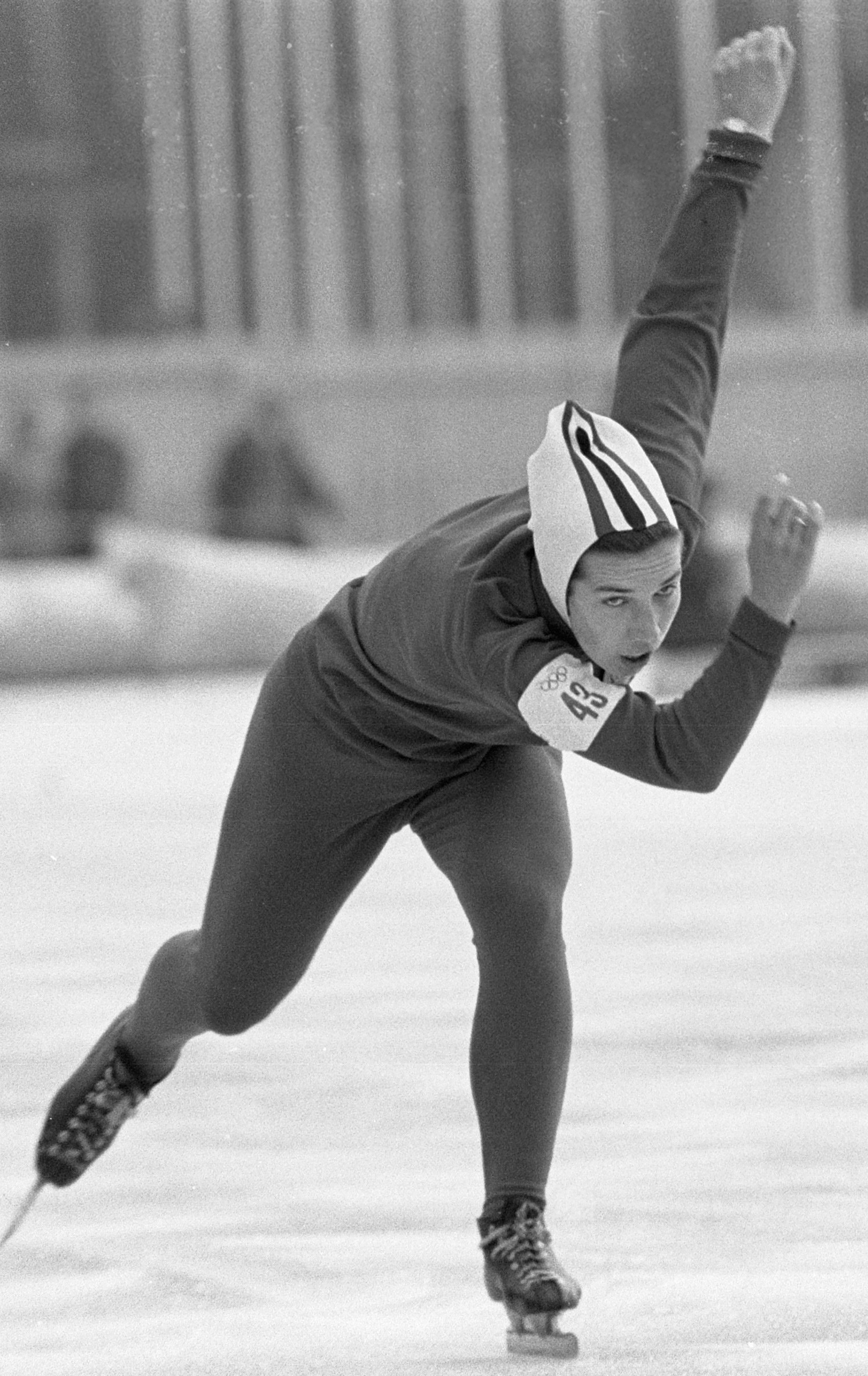
- Lāsma Kauniste at the 1968 Olympics

Personal information
- Born: 19 April 1942 (age 84) Riga, Reichskommissariat Ostland
- Height: 1.67 m (5 ft 6 in)
- Weight: 60 kg (132 lb)

Sport
- Sport: Speed skating
- Club: Lokomotiv Riga

Lāsma Kauniste (Russian: Ласма Хермановна Каунисте, Lasma Khermanovna Kauniste), née Avotiņa (Russian: Авотиня, Avotinya), (born 19 April 1942) is a Latvian speed skater.

Lāsma Avotiņa married Estonian speed skater Toivo Kauniste in 1962 and they settled in Riga. Competing for the Soviet Union as Lāsma Kauniste, she won bronze at the Soviet All-round Championships in 1967 and silver at the World Allround Championships. Despite never winning the Soviet Allround Championships, she was crowned World All-round Champion in 1969. she competed in the 1,000 m, 1,500 m, and 3,000 m events at the 1968 Winter Olympics with the best result of fifth place on 1,500 m.

Kauniste was active in speed skating for a long time, participating in Masters events. She became World Champion Masters in the category over 60 in both 2002 and 2004. At the 2007 World Championships Masters, she won silver in the category over 60.

Her achievements earned her the Honoured Master of Sports of the USSR title.

== Medals ==
An overview of medals won by Kauniste at important championships:

Championships	Gold medal	Silver medal	Bronze medal
Winter Olympics	–	–	–
World Allround	1969	1967	–
European Allround	–	–	–
Soviet Allround	–	1968; 1969; 1970	1967
Soviet Sprint	–	–	–
Soviet Single Distance	1967 (1,000 m); 1968 (1,500 m); 1969 (1,000 m); 1973 (500 m)	1968 (1,000 m); 1970 (1,000 m)	1968 (3,000 m); 1973 (1,000 m)
