= Kim Myung-ja (speed skater) =

North Korean speed skater (born 1955)

Personal information
- Full name: 김명자, 金明子
- Nationality: North Korean
- Born: 10 March 1955 (age 70)

Sport
- Sport: Speed skating

Kim Myung-ja (born 10 March 1955) is a North Korean speed skater. She competed in the women's 1500 metres at the 1972 Winter Olympics.
