= Angela Hauck =

German speed skater (born 1965)

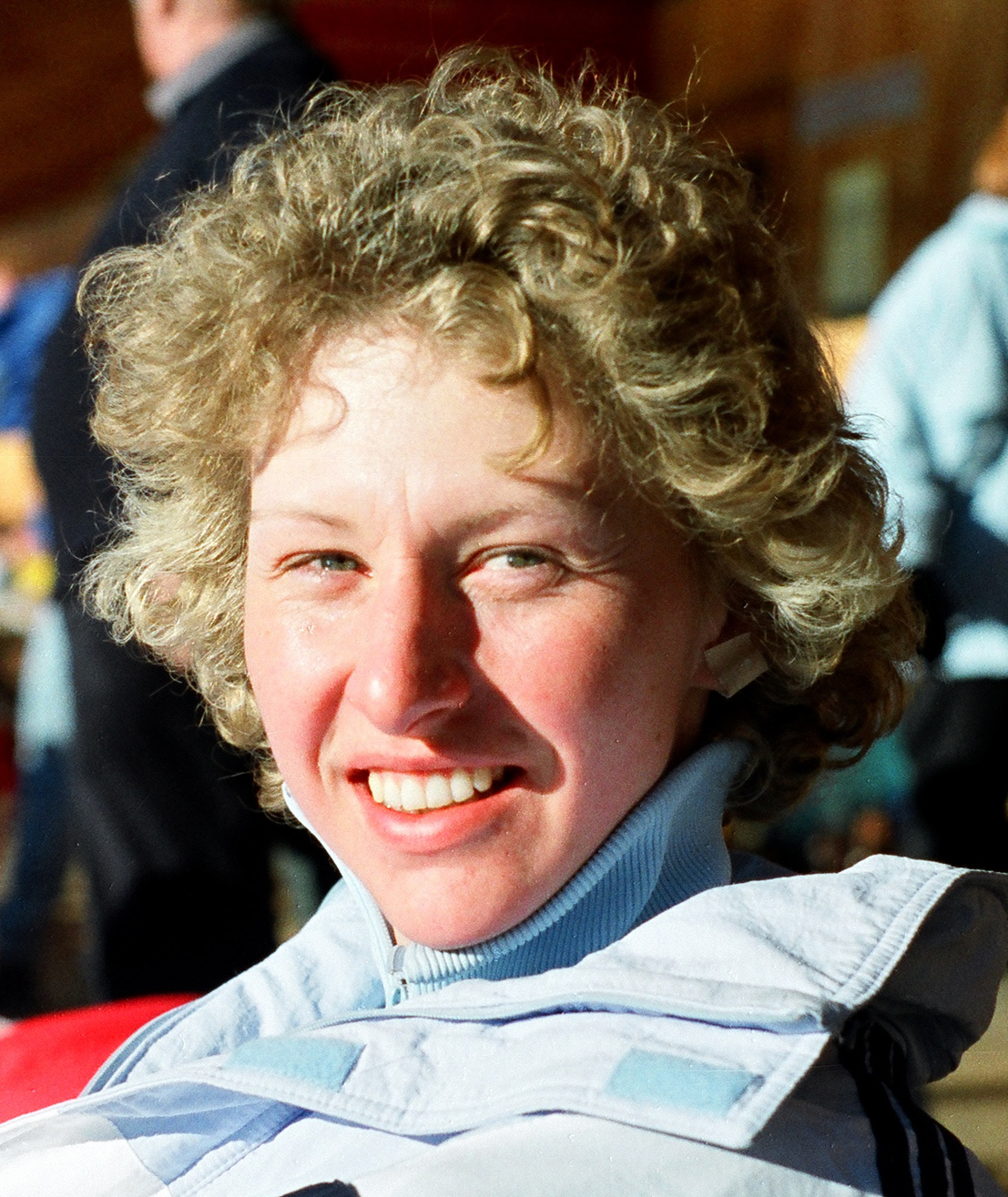

Personal information
- Born: 2 August 1965 (age 60) East Berlin, East Germany

Sport
- Country: Germany
- Sport: Speed skating
Medal record
Women's speed skating
Representing East Germany
World Championships
Gold medal – first place	1990 Tromsø	Sprint
Silver medal – second place	1985 Heerenveen	Sprint
Women's World Cup
Gold medal – first place	1988–89	1000 m
Gold medal – first place	1989–90	500 m
Gold medal – first place	1989–90	1000 m
Silver medal – second place	1988–89	500 m
Representing Germany
World Championships
Silver medal – second place	1994 Calgary	Sprint
Women's World Cup
Bronze medal – third place	1991–92	500 m
Bronze medal – third place	1993–94	1000 m

Angela Stahnke-Hauck (born 2 October 1965) is a German speed skater who has won many titles. She also competed for the SC Dynamo Berlin / Sportvereinigung (SV) Dynamo. She is married to handball-player Stephan Hauck and competed at three Winter Olympics.
