= Beth Heiden =

American sportswoman (born 1959)

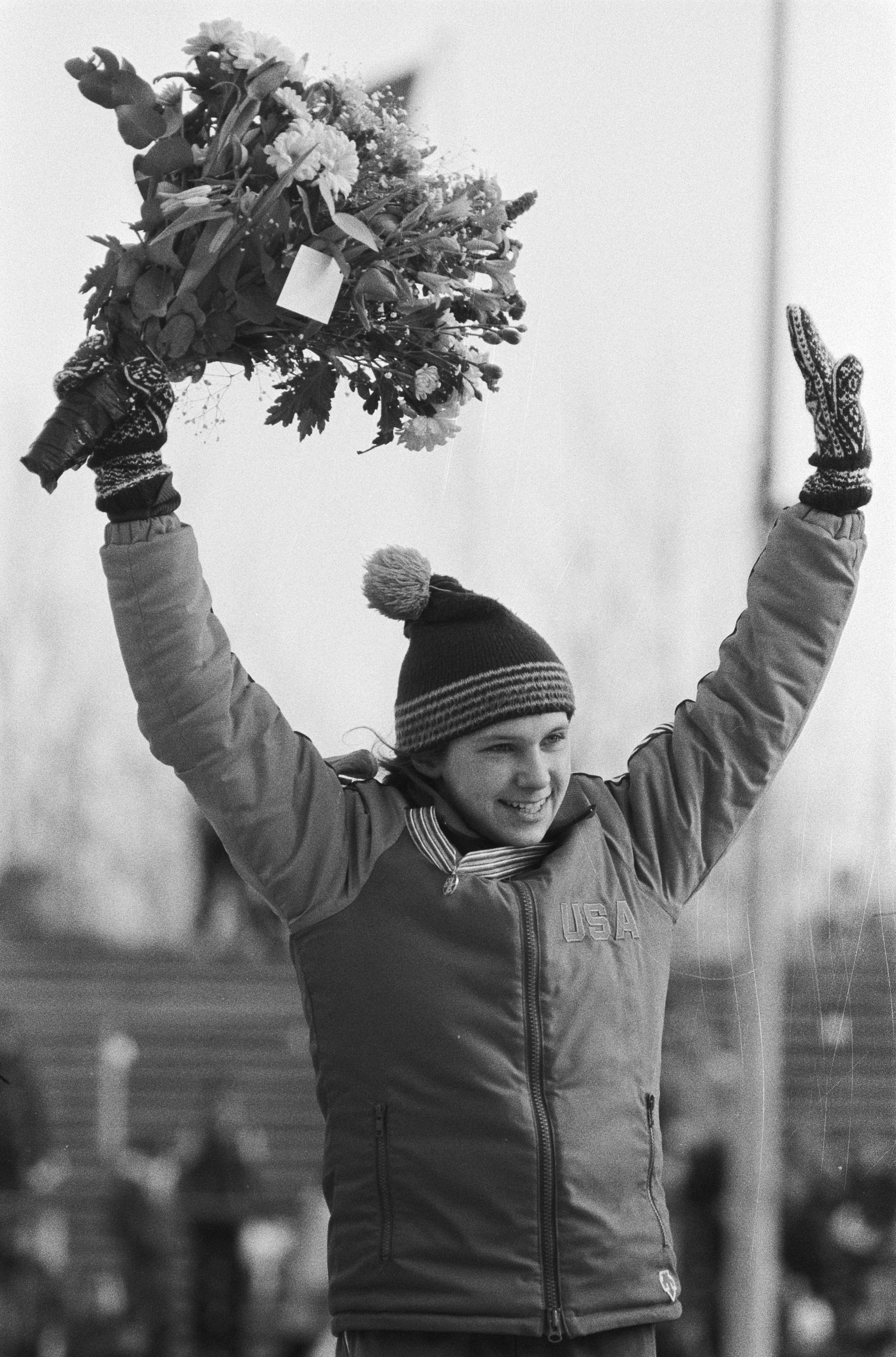
- Heiden during the World Championships in The Hague, the Netherlands in February 1979

Personal information
- Born: September 27, 1959 (age 66) Madison, Wisconsin, United States

Sport
- Sport: Speed skating
- Club: Madison Speed Skating Club
Medal record
Representing the United States
Olympic Games
Bronze medal – third place	1980 Lake Placid	3,000 m
World Championships
Gold medal – first place	1978 Montreal	Junior
Gold medal – first place	1979 The Hague	Allround
Gold medal – first place	1979 Grenoble	Junior
Silver medal – second place	1976 Madonna di Campiglio	Junior
Silver medal – second place	1977 Inzell	Junior
Silver medal – second place	1978 Lake Placid	Sprint
Silver medal – second place	1979 Inzell	Sprint
Silver medal – second place	1980 Hamar	Allround
Bronze medal – third place	1980 West-Allis	Sprint
Women’s Cycling
World Championships
Gold medal – first place	1980	Road race

Elizabeth Lee Heiden Reid (born September 27, 1959) is an American athlete who excelled in speed skating, cross-country skiing, and bicycle racing. She was born in Madison, Wisconsin. She was a speedskating bronze medalist at the 1980 Lake Placid Winter Olympics, where her brother Eric won five speedskating gold medals.

== Biography ==
In her first year of high school (Madison West High School) Heiden was a tennis and soccer player. That same year, 1975, she ran a national record in the mile for her age and ran in the state championship for both the 800 and the mile.

She attended her first Olympics in 1976, at the age of 17. In 1979, she won the World Allround Speed Skating Championships, the second American woman to do so. (Kit Klein had been the first, winning the first official world championship in 1936.) Heiden won a bronze medal in the 3,000 m at the 1980 Winter Olympics in Lake Placid, skating on an ankle injury that had bothered her for some time.

In cycle racing, which she took up as cross training outside the skating season, Heiden won both the United States National Road Race Championships and the Road World Championship in 1980. After the Olympics, while a student at the University of Vermont (UVM), she was the NCAA national champion in cross-country skiing in 1983 and an All-American in the same sport, as a walk on in her first year of the sport. In that same year she became the US National Champion in one of the skiing distance events. She graduated from the university in 1983 and was inducted into the UVM Athletic Hall of Fame in 1993. She has also been inducted in the Speed Skating Hall of Fame.

She suffered a broken wrist and a ruptured spleen when she fell to the ground in 1980 after a second-floor porch railing gave way.

She now lives in California, where she continues cross-country skiing with her family. In the 2010 US Nationals, Heiden placed in the top 10 in two races at the age of 50. She has won the California Gold Rush, Great Race, and won every single race she competed in at the cross-country skiing Master's World Championships in McCall, Idaho. She placed in the top five at the NCAA Western Regionals in 2006 as a guest skier, and achieved a top 20 and two top 15s in the US Supertour in West Yellowstone in 2009.

On November 16, 2013, she was inducted into the US Bicycling Hall of Fame in the "Modern Road & Track Competitor" category.

Heiden's daughter, Joanne Reid, has been a member of the US biathlon national team since 2015 and was an NCAA champion cross-country skier at the University of Colorado Boulder.

== Speed skating ==
For most of her skating career Heiden was a junior, but she belonged to the world top. This meant she participated in both junior and regular championships during the same season several times, both with success. This was most obvious in 1979, when she became world allround champion and, three weeks afterwards, world junior allround champion, at both championships winning all four distances. Between those championships, she won silver at the world sprint championship, winning both 1,000 m races.

Much was expected of her the following year at the 1980 Winter Olympics, but an ankle injury kept her from her potential. Despite that, she won a bronze medal in the 3,000 m. Her brother swept the five men's races at the same Olympics.

Heiden is one of only two American women to have become world allround champion, the other being Kit Klein in 1936. Heiden was inducted in the National Speedskating Hall of Fame in 1989. Her brother Eric was inducted the same day.

=== Medals ===
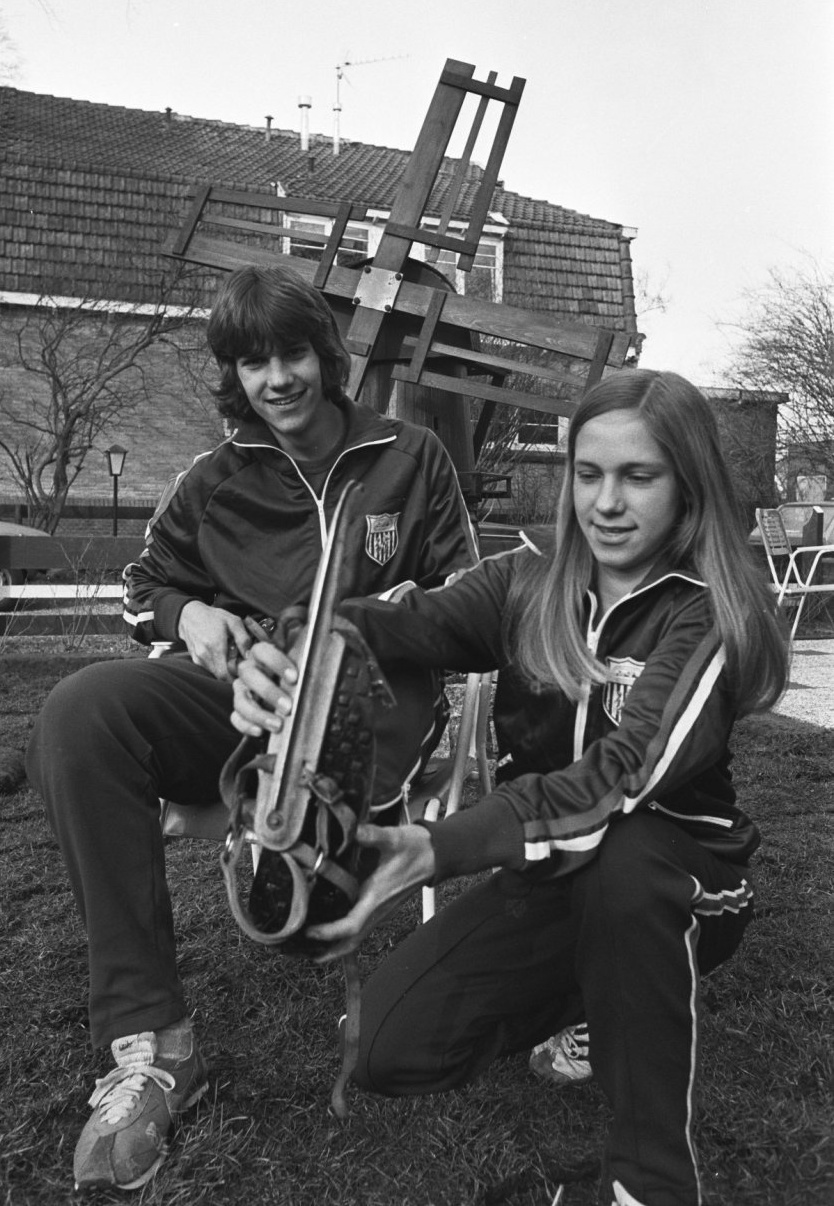
Beth and Eric Heiden in 1977 in Alkmaar, the Netherlands

An overview of medals won by Heiden at important championships, listing the years :

Championships	Gold medal	Silver medal	Bronze medal
Winter Olympics	–	–	1980 (3,000 m)
World Allround	1979	1980	–
World Sprint	–	1978; 1979	1980
World Junior Allround	1978; 1979	1976; 1977	–

=== Personal records ===
To put these personal records in perspective, the WR column lists the official world records on the dates that Heiden skated personal records.

Event	Result	Date	Venue	WR
500 m	41.78	6 March 1980	Inzell	40.68
1,000 m	1:23.66	21 January 1980	Davos	1:23.46
1,500 m	2:07.87	19 January 1980	Davos	2:07.18
3,000 m	4:32.60	21 January 1980	Davos	4:31.00
5,000 m	8:06.93	18 March 1979	Savalen	none

Note that the 5,000 m was suspended as a world record event at the 1955 ISU (International Skating Union) Congress and reinstated at the 1982 ISU Congress.

Heiden has an Adelskalender score of 178.529 points.

== See also ==
- List of Olympic medalist families
