= Lyudmila Titova =

Russian speed skater

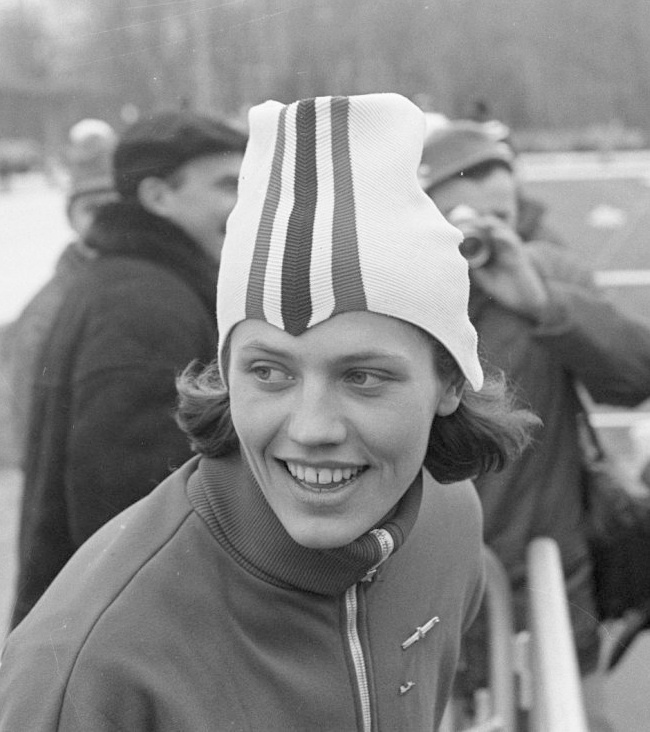
- Lyudmila Titova at the 1968 Olympics

Personal information
- Born: 26 March 1946 (age 80) Chita, Russian SFSR, Soviet Union
- Height: 1.76 m (5 ft 9 in)
- Weight: 64 kg (141 lb)

Sport
- Sport: Speed skating
- Club: Burevestnik, Zenit
Medal record
Representing Soviet Union
Women's speed skating
Olympic Games
Gold medal – first place	1968 Grenoble	500 m
Silver medal – second place	1968 Grenoble	1,000 m
Bronze medal – third place	1972 Sapporo	500 m
World Championships
Gold medal – first place	1970 Milwaukee	Sprint
Bronze medal – third place	1971 Helsinki	Allround
Bronze medal – third place	1972 Eskilstuna	Sprint
European Championships
Silver medal – second place	1971 Leningrad	Allround

Lyudmila Yevgenyevna Titova (Russian: Людмила Евгеньевна Титова) (born 26 March 1946) is a retired Russian speed skater.

== Short biography ==
Video of her 1500m race at the 1971 World Allround Speed Skating Championships for Women

After winning three national titles in 1966, she made her international debut at the World Allround Speed Skating Championships of 1966. She finished 18th overall, not having qualified for the final distance, but was second in the 500 m event. Next year, she did not compete much because of exams at the Moscow Aviation Institute where she studied.

In 1968, Titova became Soviet allround champion and two weeks later participated in the world all-round championships again, winning both the 500 m and the 1,000 m, while finishing sixth overall. Two weeks after that, at the 1968 Winter Olympics in Grenoble, she became Olympic Champion on the 500 m and won silver on the 1,000 m, finishing 0.3 seconds behind Dutch skater Carry Geijssen who skated a new Olympic record.

Titova became the 1970 World Sprint Champion (the first time they were held and named ISU Sprint Championships then) and although she loved the sprint distances and found the 3,000 m boring, it did not prevent her from competing in allround events, and she even won silver at the European Allround Championships in 1971 and bronze at the World Allround Championships that same year.

At the 1972 Winter Olympics in Sapporo, Titova won bronze on the 500 m and finished fourth on the 1,000 m, 0.23 seconds too slow for bronze. Later that same year, she won bronze at the World Sprint Championships and became Soviet Sprint Champion. She then semi-retired until the 1975 World Sprint Championships, where she was disqualified. Next year, she participated in the 1,000 m at the 1976 Winter Olympics, finishing seventh. Titova's last time in a competition was two months later, when she won bronze at the Soviet Sprint Championships.

After retiring from competitions she worked as a TV speed skating commentator and later as director of public relations at association Sport Park. Together with two other female graduates from the Moscow Aviation Institute, Titova – almost 50 years old then – was part of a skiing expedition team that reached the Geographic South Pole on 11 January 1996.

== Medals ==
An overview of medals won by Titova at important championships she participated in, listing the years in which she won each:

Championships	Gold medal	Silver medal	Bronze medal
Winter Olympics	1968 (500 m)	1968 (1,000 m)	1972 (500 m)
World Allround			1971
World Sprint	1970		1972
European Allround		1971	
Soviet Allround	1968	1966; 1971; 1975	
Soviet Sprint	1971; 1972		1975; 1976

== World records ==
Over the course of her career, Titova skated 3 world records:

Distance	Time	Date	Location
1,000 m	1:29.5	9 January 1970	Medeo
1,000 m	1:29.0	20 February 1971	Inzell
1,000 m	1:27.7	21 February 1971	Inzell

== Personal records ==
Distance	Time	Date	Location
500 m	42.35	29 March 1975	Medeo
1,000 m	1:24.31	16 March 1976	Medeo
1,500 m	2:14.77	21 March 1975	Medeo
3,000 m	5:01.89	16 January 1972	Inzell
