= Tak In-suk =

North Korean speed skater

Personal information
- Full name: 탁인숙,卓仁淑
- Nationality: North Korean
- Born: 25 April 1949 (age 75)

Sport
- Sport: Speed skating

Tak In-suk (born 25 April 1949) is a North Korean speed skater. She competed in two events at the 1972 Winter Olympics.
