= Kim Bok-soon =

North Korean speed skater (born 1950)

Personal information
- Full name: 김복순
- Nationality: North Korean
- Born: 6 January 1950 (age 76) Musan, North Korea

Sport
- Sport: Speed skating

Kim Bok-soon (Korean: 김복순; Hanja: 金福順; born 6 January 1950) is a North Korean speed skater. She represented her nation between 1968 and 1979 at international competitions.

Kim Bok-soon participated in the World Allround Speed Skating Championships for Women in 1968, finishing 29th overall. In April 1970 she started in two events at the 1970 Winter Universiade, with her best result in the 1500m, finishing 5th. She competed in two events at the 1972 Winter Olympics. After no international competitions in the years after the Olympics, she competed at a friendly international competition in Zakopane, Poland in February 1979.

== Records ==
=== Personal records ===
Personal records
Women's speed skating
Event	Result	Date	Location	Notes
500 m	46,40	01 March 1974	Ulaanbaatar CS	
1000 m	1.37,00	02 March 1974	Ulaanbaatar CS	
1500 m	2.25,48	12 February 1972	Sapporo	
3000 m	5.04,10	07 January 1970	Pyongyang	
