= Ellie van den Brom =

Dutch speed skater

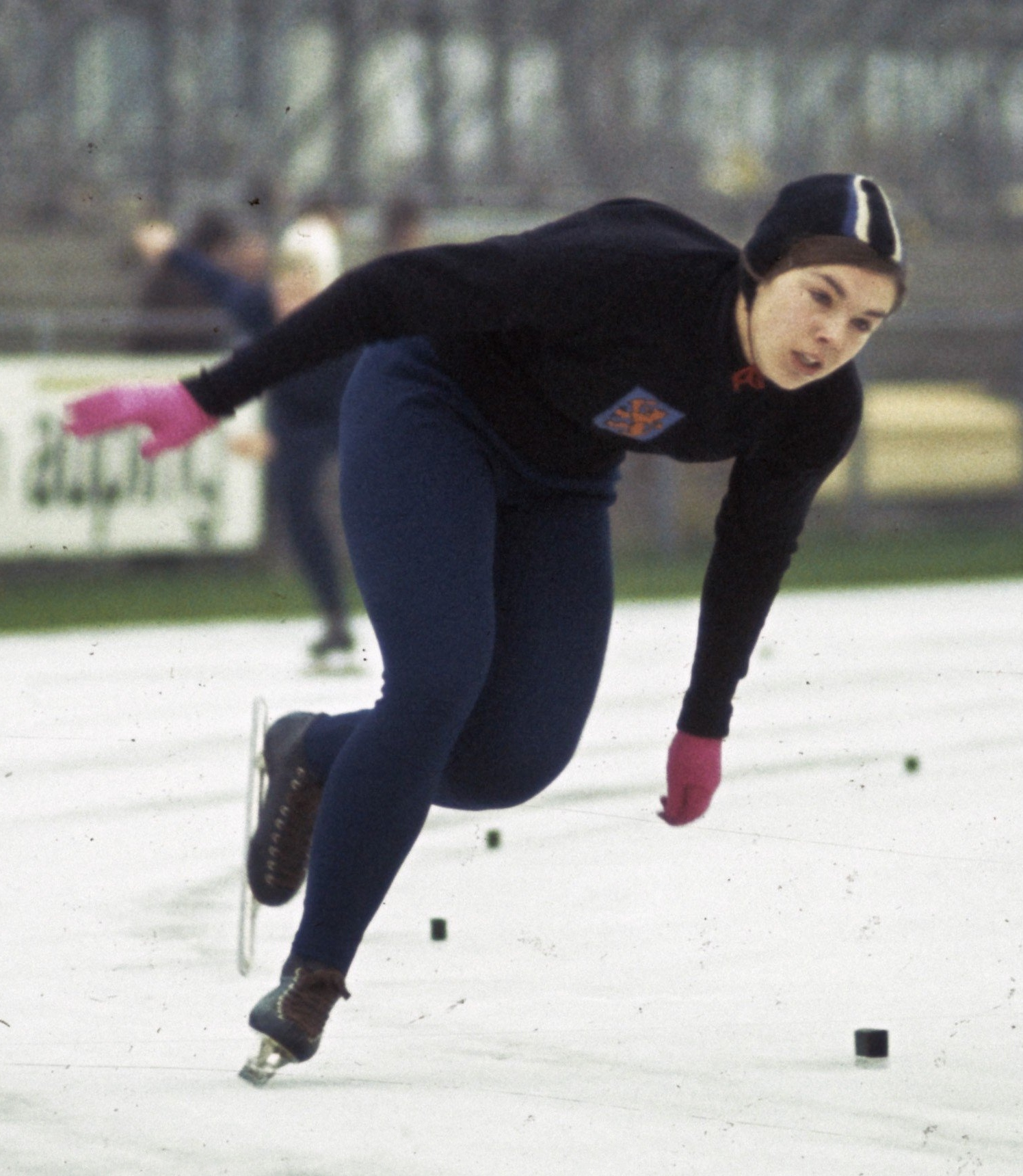
- Ellie van den Brom in 1968

Personal information
- Born: 18 June 1949 (age 77) Amsterdam, Netherlands
- Height: 1.72 m (5 ft 8 in)
- Weight: 66 kg (146 lb)

Sport
- Sport: Speed skating

Elisabeth Margot "Ellie" van den Brom (born 18 June 1949) is a retired speed skater from the Netherlands who competed at the 1968 and 1972 Winter Olympics. In 1968 she was placed fifth in the 500 m, whereas in 1972 she finished in tenth, seventh and fourth place in the 500, 1000 and 1500 m events. In 1969 she set a new world record on the 1000 m and five national records on 500 m and 1000 m.
