= Atje Keulen-Deelstra =

Dutch speed skater (1938–2013)

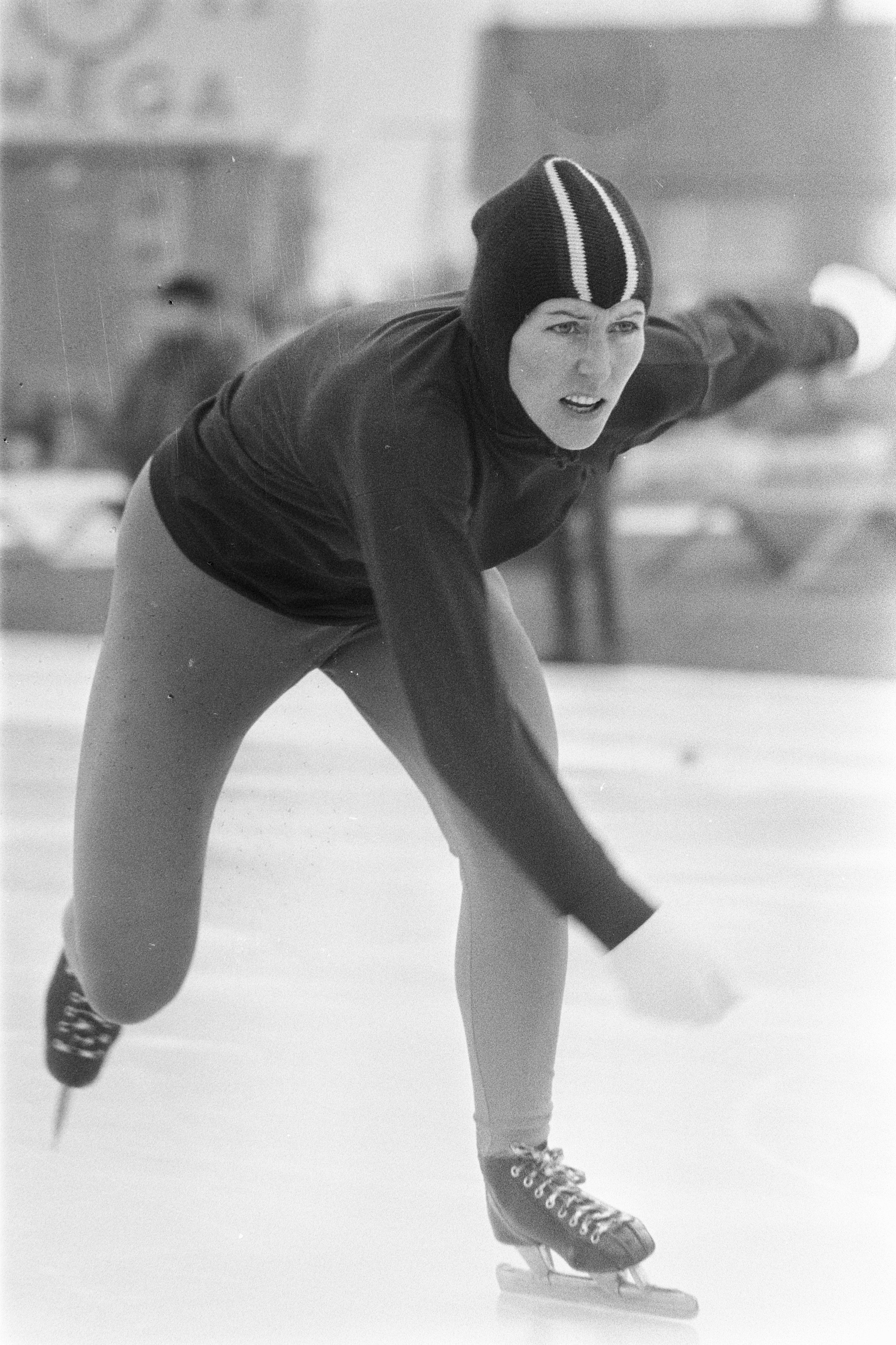

Personal information
- Born: 31 December 1938 Grou, Netherlands
- Died: 22 February 2013 (aged 74) Leeuwarden, Netherlands
- Height: 1.68 m (5 ft 6 in)
- Weight: 60 kg (132 lb)

Sport
- Country: Netherlands
- Sport: Speed skating
Medal record
Women's speed skating
Representing Netherlands
Olympic Games
Silver medal – second place	1972 Sapporo	1,000 m
Bronze medal – third place	1972 Sapporo	1,500 m
Bronze medal – third place	1972 Sapporo	3,000 m
World Allround Championships
Gold medal – first place	1970 West-Allis	Allround
Gold medal – first place	1972 Heerenveen	Allround
Gold medal – first place	1973 Strömsund	Allround
Gold medal – first place	1974 Heerenveen	Allround
World Sprint Championships
Bronze medal – third place	1970 West-Allis	Sprint
Silver medal – second place	1973 Oslo	Sprint
Silver medal – second place	1974 Innsbruck	Sprint
European Championships
Gold medal – first place	1972 Inzell	Allround
Gold medal – first place	1973 Brandbu	Allround
Gold medal – first place	1974 Alma-Ata	Allround
Dutch Allround championships
Gold medal – first place	1970	Allround
Gold medal – first place	1972	Allround
Gold medal – first place	1973	Allround
Gold medal – first place	1974	Allround
Silver medal – second place	1971	Allround
Dutch Marathon Championships
Gold medal – first place	1975	Artificial Ice
Gold medal – first place	1976	Artificial Ice
Gold medal – first place	1977	Artificial Ice
Gold medal – first place	1978	Artificial Ice
Gold medal – first place	1980	Artificial Ice

Atje Keulen-Deelstra (31 December 1938 – 22 February 2013) was a Dutch speed skater, who was a four-time World Allround Champion between the age of 32 and 36.

== Biography ==
Atje Deelstra was born as the eldest of four siblings in a farmer's family. As a teenager she did gymnastics, athletics and basketball, but finally chose speed skating. At the age of 16, she already won a junior title of Friesland and several cash prizes in the Netherlands. In 1962, she married Jelle Keulen (23 November 1931 – 28 July 2011), a farmer with whom she had three children born between 1963 and 1966.

When the Thialf arena opened in 1967 in Heerenveen, Keulen-Deelstra went there to work on a comeback. She quickly made much progress, but she was told over and over again that she was too old. Not a member of the Dutch speed skating team, she won the Dutch Allround Championships in 1970 at the age of 32, beating Dutch skating team members such as Ans Schut and multiple world champion Stien Kaiser. That same year, she became World Allround Champion. More successes soon followed when in 1972, she became Dutch, European, and World Allround Champion, a feat she then repeated the following two years (1973 and 1974). In addition, at the 1972 Winter Olympics in Sapporo, she won one silver and two bronze medals.

In 1975, Keulen-Deelstra switched to marathon skating and she became Dutch Champion in that discipline five times. She won her last Dutch Marathon Championships title in 1980 when she was 42 years old. In 1997, just a few weeks after having been injured in a traffic accident, Keulen-Deelstra participated in the Elfstedentocht. She died of a cerebral infarction in 2013.

In the 1980s and early 1990s, her daughter Boukje Keulen (born 2 December 1963) also was a successful skater. Like her mother, Boukje went from short track through long track ("regular") to marathon speed skating.

== Medals ==
An overview of medals won by Keulen-Deelstra at important championships she participated in, listing the years in which she won each:

Championships	Gold medal	Silver medal	Bronze medal
Winter Olympics		1972 (1,000 m)	1972 (1,500 m); 1972 (3,000 m)
World Allround	1970; 1972; 1973; 1974		
World Sprint		1973; 1974	1970
European Allround	1972; 1973; 1974		
Dutch Allround	1970; 1972; 1973; 1974	1971	

Dutch National Kortebaan Speed Skating Championships - (gold) 1969, 1976, 1977

== World records ==
Over the course of her career, Keulen-Deelstra skated 2 world records:

Distance	Result	Date	Location
1,500 m	2:17.2	14 March 1970	Inzell
Mini combination	182.805	16 January 1972	Inzell

Awards
Preceded by Maria Gommers	Dutch Sportswoman of the Year; 1970	Succeeded by Willy Stähle
Olympic Games
Preceded by Stien Baas-Kaiser	Flagbearer for Netherlands; Sapporo 1972	Succeeded by Dianne de Leeuw
