= Sylvia Burka =

Canadian cyclist and speed skater

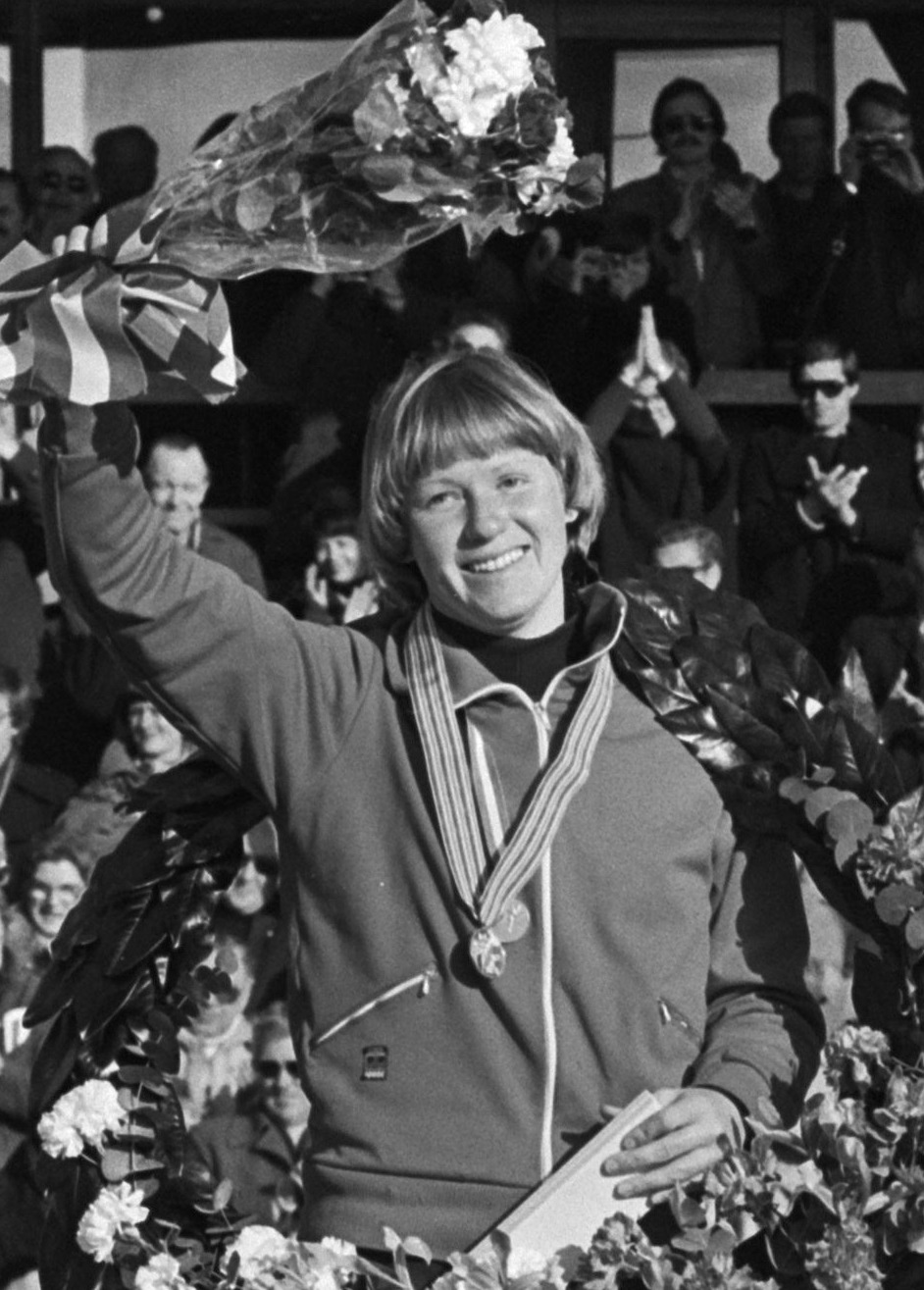
- Sylvia Burka in 1977

Personal information
- Full name: Sylvia Burka
- Born: May 4, 1954 (age 72) Winnipeg, Manitoba, Canada
- Height: 1.70 m (5 ft 7 in)
- Weight: 68 kg (150 lb)

Sport
- Sport: Speedskating and track cycling
Medal record
Women's speed skating
Representing Canada
World Championships
Gold medal – first place	1973 Assen	Junior
Gold medal – first place	1976 Gjøvik	Allround
Gold medal – first place	1977 Alkmaar	Sprint
Bronze medal – third place	1976 Berlin	Sprint
Bronze medal – third place	1979 The Hague	Allround

Sylvia Burka (Latvian: Silvija Burka; born May 4, 1954, in Winnipeg, Manitoba) is a former ice speed skater and track cyclist from Canada of Latvian descent. She represented Canada at three consecutive Winter Olympics, starting in 1972 in Sapporo, Japan. She was the first person in history to win a World Championship in both Allround and Sprint disciplines (1976 and 1977). She never won an Olympic medal, with her best Olympic result being the fourth place in 1000 m in 1976.

In 1975, she began competing in track cycling. In 1978, she won the Canadian sprint cycling championship. Over her career, she won 12 national sprint titles as well as victories in the 100m, pursuit, time trial, and road race events. She set a women's indoor world cycling record in 1982, with her time of 1:14.976 in the 1000-metre time trial event.

In 1977, she was inducted into Canada's Sports Hall of Fame. In 1983 she was inducted into the Manitoba Sports Hall of Fame and Museum.

She was married to Jocelyn Lovell, a multiple national National and Commonwealth champion cyclist. While on a training bike ride, he was involved in a life-changing collision that made him a quadriplegic. He encouraged Burka to leave him and get on with her life. They separated in 1986 and later divorced.
