= Kim Sun-ok (bobsledder) =

South Korean bobsledder (born 1980)

Personal information
- Nationality: South Korean
- Born: 4 September 1980 (age 45) Seoul, South Korea
- Height: 1.66 m (5 ft 5 in)
- Weight: 62 kg (137 lb)

Korean name
- Hangul: 김선옥
- RR: Gim Seonok
- MR: Kim Sŏnok

Sport
- Country: South Korea
- Sport: Bobsleigh

Kim Sun-ok (born 4 September 1980 in Seoul) is a South Korean bobsledder.

Kim competed at the 2014 Winter Olympics for South Korea. She teamed with Shin Mi-Hwa in the two-woman event, finishing 18th.

Kim made her World Cup debut in December 2013. As of April 2014, her best World Cup finish is 20th, at a pair of events in 2013-14.
