= Jeon Seon-ok =

South Korean speed skater

Personal information
- Full name: 전선옥,全善玉
- Nationality: South Korean
- Born: 23 January 1952 (age 73)

Sport
- Sport: Speed skating

Jeon Seon-ok (born 23 January 1952) is a South Korean speed skater. She competed in three events at the 1972 Winter Olympics.
