= World Sprint Speed Skating Championships =

World championship

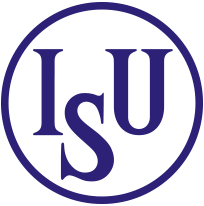
- Status: active
- Genre: sporting event
- Date: varying
- Frequency: annual
- Country: varying
- Inaugurated: 1970

The World Sprint Speed Skating Championships are annual speed skating championships. The championships are held over a two-day period, with the skaters racing one 500 m and one 1,000 m each day (so-called sprint combination). Since the higher speeds towards the end of the race tend to favour the skater who skates the last outer lane, each skater starts both distances once in the inner lane and once in the outer lane. The times on those distances are then converted to points using the samalog system, and the skaters are then ranked according to the fewest points.

The International Skating Union has organised the World Sprint Championships for Men and the World Sprint Championships for Women since 1970 and both are held at the same time and venue. The first two years (1970 and 1971), they were called the ISU Sprint Championships. Since 2020, the men's and women's World Sprint Championships are held every even year – at same time and venue as the men's and women's World Allround Championships.

The (non-Olympic) team sprint world championship events are normally being held at the World Single Distances Speed Skating Championships since 2019. In a 2021–22 Olympic season this events were held during the 2022 World Sprint Speed Skating Championships.

== Hosts ==
Year	Venue	Nation
1970	West Allis	United States
1971	Inzell	West Germany
1972	Eskilstuna	Sweden
1973	Oslo	Norway
1974	Innsbruck	Austria
1975	Gothenburg	Sweden
1976	West Berlin	West Germany
1977	Alkmaar	Netherlands
1978	Lake Placid	United States
1979	Inzell	West Germany
1980	West Allis	United States
1981	Grenoble	France
1982	Alkmaar	Netherlands
1983	Helsinki	Finland
1984	Trondheim	Norway
1985	Heerenveen	Netherlands
1986	Karuizawa	Japan
1987	Sainte Foy	Canada

Year	Venue	Nation
1988	West Allis	United States
1989	Heerenveen	Netherlands
1990	Tromsø	Norway
1991	Inzell	Germany
1992	Oslo	Norway
1993	Ikaho	Japan
1994	Calgary	Canada
1995	Milwaukee	United States
1996	Heerenveen	Netherlands
1997	Hamar	Norway
1998	Berlin	Germany
1999	Calgary	Canada
2000	Seoul	South Korea
2001	Inzell	Germany
2002	Hamar	Norway
2003	Calgary	Canada
2004	Nagano	Japan
2005	Salt Lake City	United States

Year	Venue	Nation
2006	Heerenveen	Netherlands
2007	Hamar	Norway
2008	Heerenveen	Netherlands
2009	Moscow	Russia
2010	Obihiro	Japan
2011	Heerenveen	Netherlands
2012	Calgary	Canada
2013	Salt Lake City	United States
2014	Nagano	Japan
2015	Astana	Kazakhstan
2016	Seoul	South Korea
2017	Calgary	Canada
2018	Changchun	China
2019	Heerenveen	Netherlands
2020	Hamar	Norway
2022	Hamar	Norway
2024	Inzell	Germany
2026	Heerenveen	Netherlands

== Medal tables (1970–2026) ==
=== Combined all-time medal count including team sprint ===
Rank	Nation	Gold	Silver	Bronze	Total
1	United States	21	24	17	62
2	Netherlands	14	16	26	56
3	Soviet Union	11	10	8	29
4	Canada	10	13	8	31
5	East Germany	10	8	3	21
6	Germany	8	6	6	20
7	Japan	7	12	13	32
8	South Korea	7	3	4	14
9	China	6	5	4	15
10	Russia	6	3	4	13
11	Norway	4	4	6	14
12	West Germany	2	0	3	5
13	Finland	1	2	0	3
14	Belarus	1	1	1	3
14	Sweden	1	1	1	3
16	CIS	1	0	0	1
17	Poland	0	2	2	4
18	Australia	0	0	1	1
18	Austria	0	0	1	1
18	Czech Republic	0	0	1	1
18	Italy	0	0	1	1
Totals (21 entries)		110	110	110	330

== Notes ==
1. - Using the world record per 2012 as an example: at the world championships on 28/29 January 2012, Stefan Groothuis skated his 500 m races in 34.84 and 34.74 seconds, respectively, and his 1,000 m races in 1:07.50 and 1:06.96. His total score was therefore 34.840 + 34.740 + 33.750 + 33.480 = 136.810 points.
