= Soviet Union at the 1972 Winter Olympics =

- Flag of the Soviet Union
- IOC code: URS
- NOC: Soviet Olympic Committee

in Sapporo
- Competitors: 78 (58 men, 20 women) in 9 sports
- Flag bearer: Vyacheslav Vedenin (cross-country skiing)
- Medals Ranked 1st: Gold 8 Silver 5 Bronze 3 Total 16

Winter Olympics appearances (overview)
- 1956; 1960; 1964; 1968; 1972; 1976; 1980; 1984; 1988

Other related appearances
- Latvia (1924–1936, 1992–pres.); Estonia (1928–1936, 1992–pres.); Lithuania (1928, 1992–pres.); Unified Team (1992); Armenia (1994–pres.); Belarus (1994–2022); Georgia (1994–pres.); Kazakhstan (1994–pres.); Kyrgyzstan (1994–pres.); Moldova (1994–pres.); Russia (1994–2014); Ukraine (1994–pres.); Uzbekistan (1994–pres.); Azerbaijan (1998–pres.); Tajikistan (2002–pres.); Olympic Athletes from Russia (2018); ROC (2022); Individual Neutral Athletes (2026)

The Soviet Union (USSR) competed at the 1972 Winter Olympics in Sapporo, Japan.

== Medalists ==
| Medal | Name | Sport | Event |
|---|---|---|---|
| Gold | Aleksandr Tikhonov; Rinnat Safin; Ivan Biakov; Viktor Mamatov | Biathlon | Men's 4 x 7.5 km relay |
| Gold | Vyacheslav Vedenin | Cross-country skiing | Men's 30 km |
| Gold | Vladimir Voronkov; Yury Skobov; Fyodor Simashov; Vyacheslav Vedenin | Cross-country skiing | Men's 4 × 10 km relay |
| Gold | Galina Kulakova | Cross-country skiing | Women's 5 km |
| Gold | Galina Kulakova | Cross-country skiing | Women's 10 km |
| Gold | Lyubov Mukhachova; Alevtina Olyunina-Smirnova; Galina Kulakova | Cross-country skiing | Women's 3 × 5 km relay |
| Gold | Irina Rodnina; Alexei Ulanov | Figure skating | Pairs |
| Gold | Soviet Union men's national ice hockey team: Vladislav Tretiak; Alexander Pashkov; Vitaly Davydov; Viktor Kuskin; Alexander Ragulin; Gennadi Tsygankov; Vladimir Lutchenko; Valeri Vasiliev; Igor Romishevsky; Yevgeny Mishakov; Alexander Maltsev; Alexander Yakushev; Vladimir Vikulov; Anatoly Firsov; Valeri Kharlamov; Yury Blinov; Boris Mikhailov; Vladimir Petrov; Vladimir Shadrin; Yevgeny Zimin | Ice hockey | Men's competition |
| Silver | Fyodor Smishov | Cross-country skiing | Men's 15 km |
| Silver | Alevtina Olyunina-Smirnova | Cross-country skiing | Women's 10 km |
| Silver | Sergei Chetverukhin | Figure skating | Men's singles |
| Silver | Liudmila Smirnova; Andrei Suraikin | Figure skating | Pairs |
| Silver | Vera Krasnova | Speed skating | Women's 500m |
| Bronze | Vyacheslav Vedenin | Cross-country skiing | Men's 50 km |
| Bronze | Valery Muratov | Speed skating | Men's 500m |
| Bronze | Lyudmila Titova | Speed skating | Women's 500m |

== Alpine skiing ==
Men

| Athlete | Event | Race 1 | | Race 2 | | Total | |
| Athlete | Event | Time | Rank | Time | Rank | Time | Rank |
|---|---|---|---|---|---|---|---|
| Sergey Grishchenko | Downhill | | | | | 2:03.19 | 46 |
| Sergey Grishchenko | Giant Slalom | ? | 39 | DNF | – | DNF | – |

Men's slalom

| Athlete | Classification | | Final | | | | | |
| Athlete | Time | Rank | Time 1 | Rank | Time 2 | Rank | Total | Rank |
|---|---|---|---|---|---|---|---|---|
| Sergey Grishchenko | 1:49.64 | 5 | 1:02.97 | 32 | 59.70 | 21 | 2:02.67 | 22 |

Women

| Athlete | Event | Race 1 | | Race 2 | | Total | |
| Athlete | Event | Time | Rank | Time | Rank | Time | Rank |
|---|---|---|---|---|---|---|---|
| Svetlana Isakova | Downhill | | | | | 1:44.83 | 39 |
| Nina Merkulova | Downhill | | | | | 1:44.48 | 37 |
| Galina Shikhova | Downhill | | | | | 1:43.88 | 34 |
| Galina Shikhova | Giant Slalom | | | | | 1:43.74 | 34 |
| Nina Merkulova | Giant Slalom | | | | | 1:41.18 | 33 |
| Svetlana Isakova | Giant Slalom | | | | | 1:40.20 | 31 |
| Nina Merkulova | Slalom | DSQ | – | – | – | DSQ | – |
| Svetlana Isakova | Slalom | DNF | – | – | – | DNF | – |
| Galina Shikhova | Slalom | 52.07 | 23 | 53.74 | 18 | 1:45.81 | 19 |

== Biathlon ==
Men

| Event | Athlete | Time | Penalties | Adjusted time ^{1} | Rank |
|---|---|---|---|---|---|
| 20 km | Rinnat Safin | 1'15:22.59 | 7 | 1'22:22.59 | 19 |
| 20 km | Ivan Biakov | 1'17:42.78 | 3 | 1'20:42.78 | 12 |
| 20 km | Viktor Mamatov | 1'16:16.26 | 2 | 1'18:16.26 | 7 |
| 20 km | Aleksandr Tikhonov | 1'12:48.65 | 4 | 1'16:48.65 | 4 |

Men's 4 x 7.5 km relay

| Athletes | Race | | |
| Athletes | Misses ^{2} | Time | Rank |
|---|---|---|---|
| Aleksandr Tikhonov; Rinnat Safin; Ivan Biakov; Viktor Mamatov | 3 | 1'51:44.92 | 1st place, gold medalist(s) |

== Cross-country skiing ==
Men

| Event | Athlete | Race | |
| Event | Athlete | Time | Rank |
|---|---|---|---|
| 15 km | Valery Tarakanov | 46:48.32 | 16 |
| 15 km | Vladimir Voronkov | 46:33.43 | 12 |
| 15 km | Yury Skobov | 46:04.59 | 5 |
| 15 km | Fyodor Smishov | 46:00.84 | 2nd place, silver medalist(s) |
| 30 km | Vladimir Dolganov | 1'40:48.85 | 16 |
| 30 km | Yury Skobov | 1'40:18.70 | 15 |
| 30 km | Fyodor Simashov | 1'38:22.50 | 6 |
| 30 km | Vyacheslav Vedenin | 1'36:31.15 | 1st place, gold medalist(s) |
| 50 km | Ivan Garanin | 2'50:00.78 | 17 |
| 50 km | Ivan Pronin | 2'49:45.59 | 15 |
| 50 km | Fyodor Simashov | 2'45:08.93 | 8 |
| 50 km | Vyacheslav Vedenin | 2'44:00.19 | 3rd place, bronze medalist(s) |

Men's 4 × 10 km relay

| Athletes | Race | |
| Athletes | Time | Rank |
|---|---|---|
| Vladimir Voronkov; Yury Skobov; Fyodor Simashov; Vyacheslav Vedenin | 2'04:47.94 | 1st place, gold medalist(s) |

Women

| Event | Athlete | Race | |
| Event | Athlete | Time | Rank |
|---|---|---|---|
| 5 km | Nina Baldycheva-Fyodorova | 17:25.62 | 10 |
| 5 km | Lyubov Mukhachova | 17:12.08 | 6 |
| 5 km | Alevtina Olyunina-Smirnova | 17:07.40 | 4 |
| 5 km | Galina Kulakova | 17:00.50 | 1st place, gold medalist(s) |
| 10 km | Nina Shebalina | 35:54.59 | 10 |
| 10 km | Lyubov Mukhachova | 34:58.56 | 4 |
| 10 km | Alevtina Olyunina-Smirnova | 34:54.11 | 2nd place, silver medalist(s) |
| 10 km | Galina Kulakova | 34:17.82 | 1st place, gold medalist(s) |

Women's 3 × 5 km relay

| Athletes | Race | |
| Athletes | Time | Rank |
|---|---|---|
| Lyubov Mukhachova; Alevtina Olyunina-Smirnova; Galina Kulakova | 48:16.15 | 1st place, gold medalist(s) |

== Figure skating ==
Men

| Athlete | CF | FS | Points | Places | Rank |
|---|---|---|---|---|---|
| Yuri Ovchinnikov | 15 | 6 | 2477.5 | 104.5 | 12 |
| Vladimir Kovalev | 7 | 11 | 2521.6 | 80 | 8 |
| Sergei Chetverukhin | 3 | 1 | 2672.4 | 20 | 2nd place, silver medalist(s) |

Women

| Athlete | CF | FS | Points | Places | Rank |
|---|---|---|---|---|---|
| Marina Sanaya | 19 | 18 | 2198.6 | 160 | 18 |

Pairs

| Athletes | SP | FS | Points | Places | Rank |
|---|---|---|---|---|---|
| Irina Cherniaeva; Vasili Blagov | 6 | 5 | 399.1 | 52 | 6 |
| Liudmila Smirnova; Andrei Suraikin | 2 | 2 | 419.4 | 15 | 2nd place, silver medalist(s) |
| Irina Rodnina; Alexei Ulanov | 1 | 1 | 420.4 | 12 | 1st place, gold medalist(s) |

== Ice hockey ==
=== Medal round ===
| Rank | Team | Pld | W | L | T | GF | GA | Pts |
|---|---|---|---|---|---|---|---|---|
| 1 | Soviet Union (gold) | 5 | 4 | 0 | 1 | 33 | 13 | 9 |
| 2 | United States | 5 | 3 | 2 | 0 | 18 | 15 | 6 |
| 3 | Czechoslovakia | 5 | 3 | 2 | 0 | 26 | 13 | 6 |
| 4 | Sweden | 5 | 2 | 2 | 1 | 17 | 13 | 5 |
| 5 | Finland | 5 | 2 | 3 | 0 | 14 | 24 | 4 |
| 6 | Poland | 5 | 0 | 5 | 0 | 9 | 39 | 0 |

- USSR 9-3 Finland
- USSR 3-3 Sweden
- USSR 7-2 USA
- USSR 9-3 Poland
- USSR 5-2 Czechoslovakia

Gold:
Vladislav Tretiak
Alexander Pashkov
Vitaly Davydov
Viktor Kuskin
Alexander Ragulin
Gennadi Tsygankov
Vladimir Lutchenko
Valeri Vasiliev
Igor Romishevsky
Yevgeny Mishakov
Alexander Maltsev
Alexander Yakushev
Vladimir Vikulov
Anatoly Firsov
Valeri Kharlamov
Yury Blinov
Boris Mikhailov
Vladimir Petrov
Vladimir Shadrin
Yevgeny Zimin

== Luge ==
Men

| Athlete | Run 1 | | Run 2 | | Run 3 | | Run 4 | | Total | |
| Athlete | Time | Rank | Time | Rank | Time | Rank | Time | Rank | Time | Rank |
|---|---|---|---|---|---|---|---|---|---|---|
| Yury Svetikov | 1:00.82 | 44 | 55.01 | 29 | 54.08 | 30 | 53.78 | 31 | 3:43.69 | 41 |
| Viktor Ilyin | 56.12 | 39 | 55.50 | 37 | 55.21 | 41 | 55.25 | 39 | 3:42.08 | 37 |
| Sergey Osipov | 55.48 | 35 | 55.27 | 36 | 54.06 | 29 | 54.18 | 34 | 3:38.99 | 33 |
| Yury Yegorov | 55.08 | 28 | 54.58 | 26 | 54.64 | 35 | 53.70 | 28 | 3:38.00 | 29 |

(Men's) Doubles

| Athletes | Run 1 | | Run 2 | | Total | |
| Athletes | Time | Rank | Time | Rank | Time | Rank |
|---|---|---|---|---|---|---|
| Yury Svetikov; Sergey Osipov | 45.64 | 12 | 45.48 | 12 | 1:31.12 | 12 |
| Yury Yegorov; Viktor Ilyin | 45.66 | 13 | 45.53 | 13 | 1:31.19 | 13 |

Women

| Athlete | Run 1 | | Run 2 | | Run 3 | | Run 4 | | Total | |
| Athlete | Time | Rank | Time | Rank | Time | Rank | Time | Rank | Time | Rank |
|---|---|---|---|---|---|---|---|---|---|---|
| Nataliya Omsheva | 47.18 | 18 | 47.39 | 20 | 46.85 | 20 | 46.85 | 20 | 3:08.27 | 20 |
| Nina Ignatyeva | 46.82 | 15 | 46.84 | 17 | 46.70 | 17 | 46.09 | 16 | 3:06.45 | 17 |
| Nina Shashkova | 46.18 | 13 | 46.38 | 12 | 46.36 | 16 | 45.46 | 11 | 3:04.38 | 12 |

== Nordic combined ==
Events:

- normal hill ski jumping (Three jumps, best two counted and shown here.)
- 15 km cross-country skiing

| Athlete | Event | Ski Jumping | | | | Cross-country | | | Total | |
| Athlete | Event | Distance 1 | Distance 2 | Points | Rank | Time | Points | Rank | Points | Rank |
|---|---|---|---|---|---|---|---|---|---|---|
| Mikhail Artyukhov | Individual | 73.5 | 74.0 | 183.0 | 14 | 50:57.0 | 197.185 | 12 | 380.185 | 11 |
| Vyacheslav Dryagin | Individual | 66.0 | 70.0 | 146.2 | 35 | 50:29.4 | 201.325 | 9 | 347.525 | 29 |
| Anatoly Zaytsev | Individual | 66.5 | 68.0 | 158.3 | 26 | 50:10.4 | 204.175 | 8 | 362.475 | 22 |
| Aleksandr Nosov | Individual | 77.5 | 79.5 | 201.3 | 3 | 52:08.7 | 186.430 | 27 | 387.730 | 7 |

== Ski jumping ==
| Athlete | Event | Jump 1 | | Jump 2 | | Total | |
| Athlete | Event | Distance | Points | Distance | Points | Points | Rank |
|---|---|---|---|---|---|---|---|
| Anatoly Zheglanov | Normal hill | 73.5 | 102.3 | 75.0 | 107.7 | 210.0 | 21 |
| K'oba Ts'akadze | Normal hill | 77.5 | 109.7 | 77.5 | 110.2 | 219.9 | 9 |
| Yury Kalinin | Normal hill | 78.5 | 111.8 | 73.5 | 99.8 | 211.6 | 20 |
| Gary Napalkov | Normal hill | 79.5 | 112.4 | 76.0 | 107.8 | 220.2 | 7 |
| K'oba Ts'akadze | Large hill | 93.0 | 69.7 | 90.0 | 95.5 | 165.2 | 35 |
| Anatoly Zheglanov | Large hill | 80.5 | 73.7 | 90.0 | 97.0 | 170.7 | 32 |
| Sergey Yanin | Large hill | 89.0 | 93.1 | 87.0 | 88.3 | 181.4 | 21 |
| Gary Napalkov | Large hill | 99.5 | 111.3 | 92.0 | 98.8 | 210.1 | 6 |

== Speed skating ==
Men

| Event | Athlete | Race | |
| Event | Athlete | Time | Rank |
|---|---|---|---|
| 500 m | Vladimir Komarov | 40.65 | 14 |
| 500 m | Valery Muratov | 39.80 | 3rd place, bronze medalist(s) |
| 1500 m | Valery Muratov | 2:11.83 | 21 |
| 1500 m | Valery Lavrushkin | 2:07.16 | 6 |
| 5000 m | Valery Lavrushkin | 7:39.26 | 7 |
| 10,000 m | Valery Lavrushkin | 15:20.08 | 5 |

Women

| Event | Athlete | Race | |
| Event | Athlete | Time | Rank |
|---|---|---|---|
| 500 m | Alla Butova | 45.17 | 8 |
| 500 m | Lyudmila Titova | 44.45 | 3rd place, bronze medalist(s) |
| 500 m | Vera Krasnova | 44.01 | 2nd place, silver medalist(s) |
| 1000 m | Lyudmila Savrulina | 1:33.41 | 10 |
| 1000 m | Nina Statkevich | 1:32.21 | 5 |
| 1000 m | Lyudmila Titova | 1:31.85 | 4 |
| 1500 m | Lyudmila Savrulina | 2:25.85 | 14 |
| 1500 m | Kapitolina Seregina | 2:24.29 | 9 |
| 1500 m | Nina Statkevich | 2:23.19 | 6 |
| 3000 m | Lyudmila Savrulina | 5:06.61 | 8 |
| 3000 m | Kapitolina Seregina | 5:01.88 | 6 |
| 3000 m | Nina Statkevich | 5:01.79 | 5 |

== Medals by republic ==
In the following table for team events number of team representatives, who received medals are counted, not "one medal for all the team", as usual. Because there were people from different republics in one team.

| Rank | Nation | Gold | Silver | Bronze | Total |
|---|---|---|---|---|---|
| 1 | Russian SFSR | 36 | 6 | 3 | 45 |
| Totals (1 entries) | | 36 | 6 | 3 | 45 |

== Bibliography ==
- A. Dobrov (1973). XI Winter Olympic Games. Year 1972 (in Russian). Moscow: Fizkultura i sport. Archived from the original on 2007-08-19.
