= List of 1972 Winter Olympics medal winners =

The List of 1972 Winter Olympics medal winners here represent the athletes who competed at the 1972 Winter Olympics held in Sapporo, Japan, from 3 to 13 February 1972.

== Alpine skiing ==
=== Men's events ===
Event	Gold	Silver	Bronze
Downhill	Bernhard Russi; Switzerland	Roland Collombin; Switzerland	Heini Messner; Austria
Giant slalom	Gustav Thöni; Italy	Edy Bruggmann; Switzerland	Werner Mattle; Switzerland
Slalom	Francisco Fernández Ochoa; Spain	Gustav Thöni; Italy	Roland Thöni; Italy

=== Women's events ===
Event	Gold	Silver	Bronze
Downhill	Marie-Theres Nadig; Switzerland	Annemarie Moser-Pröll; Austria	Susan Corrock; United States
Giant slalom	Marie-Theres Nadig; Switzerland	Annemarie Moser-Pröll; Austria	Wiltrud Drexel; Austria
Slalom	Barbara Cochran; United States	Danièle Debernard; France	Florence Steurer; France

== Biathlon ==
Event	Gold	Silver	Bronze
Men's Individual	Magnar Solberg; Norway	Hansjörg Knauthe; East Germany	Lars-Göran Arwidson; Sweden
Men's Relay	Soviet Union; Aleksandr Tikhonov; Rinnat Safin; Ivan Biakov; Viktor Mamatov	Finland; Esko Saira; Juhani Suutarinen; Heikki Ikola; Mauri Röppänen	East Germany; Hansjörg Knauthe; Joachim Meischner; Dieter Speer; Horst Koschka

== Bobsleigh ==
Event	Gold	Silver	Bronze
Two-man	West Germany (FRG-2); Wolfgang Zimmerer; Peter Utzschneider	West Germany (FRG-1); Horst Floth; Pepi Bader	Switzerland (SUI-1); Jean Wicki; Edy Hubacher
Four-man	Switzerland (SUI-1); Jean Wicki; Hans Leutenegger; Werner Camichel; Edy Hubacher	Italy (ITA-1); Nevio De Zordo; Adriano Frassinelli; Corrado Dal Fabbro; Gianni Bonichon	West Germany (FRG-1); Wolfgang Zimmerer; Peter Utzschneider; Bodo Bittner; Manfred Schumann

== Cross-country skiing ==
=== Men's events ===
Event	Gold	Silver	Bronze
15 km	Sven-Åke Lundbäck; Sweden	Fyodor Simachov; Soviet Union	Ivar Formo; Norway
30 km	Vyacheslav Vedenin; Soviet Union	Pål Tyldum; Norway	Johs Harviken; Norway
50 km	Pål Tyldum; Norway	Magne Myrmo; Norway	Vyacheslav Vedenin; Soviet Union
4×10 km	Soviet Union; Vladimir Voronkov; Yuriy Skobov; Fyodor Simachov; Vyacheslav Vedenin	Norway; Oddvar Brå; Pål Tyldum; Ivar Formo; Johs Harviken	Switzerland; Alfred Kälin; Albert Giger; Alois Kälin; Eduard Hauser

=== Women's events ===
Event	Gold	Silver	Bronze
5 km	Galina Kulakova; Soviet Union	Marjatta Kajosmaa; Finland	Helena Šikolová; Czechoslovakia
10 km	Galina Kulakova; Soviet Union	Alevtina Olyunina; Soviet Union	Marjatta Kajosmaa; Finland
3×5 km	Soviet Union; Lyubov Mukhachyova; Alevtina Olyunina; Galina Kulakova	Finland; Helena Takalo; Hilkka Riihivuori; Marjatta Kajosmaa	Norway; Inger Aufles; Aslaug Dahl; Berit Mørdre

== Figure skating ==
Event	Gold	Silver	Bronze
Men's singles	Ondrej Nepela; Czechoslovakia	Sergei Chetverukhin; Soviet Union	Patrick Péra; France
Ladies' singles	Beatrix Schuba; Austria	Karen Magnussen; Canada	Janet Lynn; United States
Pairs	Soviet Union; Irina Rodnina; Alexei Ulanov	Soviet Union; Liudmila Smirnova; Andrei Suraikin	East Germany; Manuela Groß; Uwe Kagelmann

== Ice hockey ==
Event	Gold	Silver	Bronze
Men's team	Soviet Union; Vladislav Tretiak; Alexander Pashkov; Vitaly Davydov; Viktor Kuskin; Alexander Ragulin; Gennadiy Tsygankov; Vladimir Lutchenko; Valeri Vasiliev; Igor Romishevsky; Yevgeni Mishakov; Alexander Maltsev; Alexander Yakushev; Vladimir Vikulov; Anatoly Firsov; Valeri Kharlamov; Yury Blinov; Boris Mikhailov; Vladimir Petrov; Vladimir Shadrin; Yevgeni Zimin	United States; Mike Curran; Pete Sears; Wally Olds; Tom Mellor; Frank Sanders; Jim McElmury; Charles Brown; Dick McGlynn; Ronald Naslund; Robbie Ftorek; Stu Irving; Kevin Ahearn; Henry Boucha; Craig Sarner; Timothy Sheehy; Keith Christiansen; Mark Howe; Tim Regan; Bruce McIntosh	Czechoslovakia; Vladimír Dzurilla; Jiří Holeček; Vladimír Bednář; Rudolf Tajcnár; Oldřich Machač; František Pospíšil; Josef Horešovský; Karel Vohralík; Václav Nedomanský; Jiří Holík; Jaroslav Holík; Jiří Kochta; Eduard Novák; Richard Farda; Josef Černý; Vladimír Martinec; Ivan Hlinka; Bohuslav Šťastný

== Luge ==
Event	Gold	Silver	Bronze
Men's singles	Wolfgang Scheidel; East Germany	Harald Ehrig; East Germany	Wolfram Fiedler; East Germany
Women's singles	Anna-Maria Müller; East Germany	Ute Rührold; East Germany	Margit Schumann; East Germany
Doubles	East Germany; Horst Hörnlein; Reinhard Bredow Italy; Paul Hildgartner; Walter Plaikner	None awarded	East Germany; Klaus-Michael Bonsack; Wolfram Fiedler

== Nordic combined ==
Event	Gold	Silver	Bronze
Individual	Ulrich Wehling; East Germany	Rauno Miettinen; Finland	Karl-Heinz Luck; East Germany

== Ski jumping ==
Event	Gold	Silver	Bronze
Normal hill individual	Yukio Kasaya; Japan	Akitsugu Konno; Japan	Seiji Aochi; Japan
Large hill individual	Wojciech Fortuna; Poland	Walter Steiner; Switzerland	Rainer Schmidt; East Germany

== Speed skating ==
=== Men's events ===
Event	Gold	Silver	Bronze
500 metres	Erhard Keller; West Germany	Hasse Börjes; Sweden	Valery Muratov; Soviet Union
1500 metres	Ard Schenk; Netherlands	Roar Grønvold; Norway	Göran Claeson; Sweden
5000 metres	Ard Schenk; Netherlands	Roar Grønvold; Norway	Sten Stensen; Norway
10000 metres	Ard Schenk; Netherlands	Kees Verkerk; Netherlands	Sten Stensen; Norway

=== Women's events ===
Event	Gold	Silver	Bronze
500 metres	Anne Henning; United States	Vera Krasnova; Soviet Union	Lyudmila Titova; Soviet Union
1000 metres	Monika Pflug; West Germany	Atje Keulen-Deelstra; Netherlands	Anne Henning; United States
1500 metres	Dianne Holum; United States	Stien Kaiser; Netherlands	Atje Keulen-Deelstra; Netherlands
3000 metres	Stien Kaiser; Netherlands	Dianne Holum; United States	Atje Keulen-Deelstra; Netherlands

== See also ==
- 1972 Winter Olympics medal table
