= Lists of Olympic medalists =

This article includes lists of all Olympic medalists since 1896, organized by each Olympic sport or discipline, and also by Olympiad.

== Medalist with most medals by sport ==
=== Summer Olympic sports ===
Sports that will appear in the 2028 Summer Olympics are listed below, except for squash and flag football, making their first appearance in 2028.

Discipline (link to medalists list)	Contested	Number of		Medals awarded				Athlete(s) with the most medals (gold–silver–bronze)	Athlete(s) with the most gold medals
Discipline (link to medalists list)	Contested	Olympics (up to conclusion of 2024)	Medal events (in 2024)	1st place, gold medalist(s)	2nd place, silver medalist(s)	3rd place, bronze medalist(s)	Total	Athlete(s) with the most medals (gold–silver–bronze)	Athlete(s) with the most gold medals
Archery	1900–1908; 1920; since 1972	18	5	76	74	66	216	Hubert van Innis (BEL) (6–3–0)	Hubert van Innis (BEL) (6–3–0)
Artistic swimming	Since 1984	11	2	22	20	21	63	Svetlana Romashina (RUS) (7–0–0); Huang Xuechen (CHN) (0–5–2)	Svetlana Romashina (RUS) (7–0–0)
Athletics (men, women)	Since 1896	30	48	1075	1084	1073	3232	Paavo Nurmi (FIN) (9–3–0)	Paavo Nurmi (FIN) (9–3–0); Carl Lewis (USA) (9–1–0)
Badminton	Since 1992	9	5	44	44	48	136	Gao Ling (CHN) (2–1–1)	Gao Ling (CHN) (2–1–1); Fu Haifeng (CHN) (2–1–0); Viktor Axelsen (DEN) (2–0–1); Kim Dong-moon (KOR) (2–0–1); Zhang Nan (CHN) (2–0–1); Zhao Yunlei (CHN) (2–0–1); Ge Fei (CHN) (2–0–0); Gu Jun (CHN) (2–0–0); Lee Yang (TPE) (2–0–0); Lin Dan (CHN) (2–0–0); Wang Chi-lin (TPE) (2–0–0); Zhang Jun (CHN) (2–0–0); Zhang Ning (CHN) (2–0–0)
Baseball and Softball	1992–2008; 2020; 2028	6	0	11	11	11	33	Pedro Luis Lazo (CUB) (2–2–0); Laura Berg (USA) (3–0–1); Tanya Harding (AUS) (0–1–3); Melanie Roche (AUS) (0–1–3); Natalie Ward (AUS) (0–1–3)	Laura Berg (USA) (3–0–1); Lisa Fernandez (USA) (3–0–0); Lori Harrigan (USA) (3–0–0); Leah O'Brien (USA) (3–0–0)
Basketball	Since 1936	21	4	34	34	34	102	Diana Taurasi (USA) (6–0–0)	Diana Taurasi (USA) (6–0–0)
Boxing	1904; 1908; 1920–Present	25	13	226	226	389	841		
Canoeing and Kayaking (men, women)	Since 1936	21	16	258	258	260	776	Birgit Fischer (GER) (8–4–0)	Birgit Fischer (GER) (8–4–0); Lisa Carrington (NZL) (8–0–1)
Cricket	1900, 2028	1	0	1	1	0	2	see list	see list
Cycling (men, women)	Since 1896	30	22	305	304	298	907	Jason Kenny (GBR) (7–2–0)	Jason Kenny (GBR) (7–2–0)
Diving	Since 1904	28	8	138	138	139	405	Dmitri Sautin (RUS) (2–2–4)	Wu Minxia (CHN) (5–1–1); Chen Ruolin (CHN) (5–0–0)
Equestrian	1900; since 1912	28	6	159	157	157	473	Isabell Werth (GER) (8–6–0)	Isabell Werth (GER) (8–6–0)
Fencing (men, women)	Since 1896	30	12	235	235	234	704	Edoardo Mangiarotti (ITA) (6–5–2)	Aladár Gerevich (HUN) (7–1–2)
Field hockey	1908; 1920; since 1928	25	2	37	37	38	112	Leslie Claudius (IND) (3–1–0); Udham Singh (IND) (3–1–0); Eva de Goede (NED) (3–1–0); Teun de Nooijer (NED) (2–2–0); Luciana Aymar (ARG) (0–2–2)	Leslie Claudius (IND) (3–1–0); Udham Singh (IND) (3–1–0); Eva de Goede (NED) (3–1–0); Richard Allen (IND) (3–0–0); Dhyan Chand (IND) (3–0–0); Ranganandhan Francis (IND) (3–0–0); Randhir Singh Gentle (IND) (3–0–0); Rechelle Hawkes (AUS) (3–0–0); Balbir Singh, Sr. (IND) (3–0–0)
Football	1900–1928; since 1936	29	2	36	36	38	110	Christie Rampone (USA) (3–1–0)	Christie Rampone (USA) (3–1–0); Shannon Boxx (USA) (3–0–0); Heather Mitts (USA) (3–0–0); Heather O'Reilly (USA) (3–0–0)
Golf	1900–1904; since 2016	5	2	10	10	11	31	Lydia Ko (NZL) (1–1–1)	see list
Gymnastics (men, women)	Since 1896	30	18	392	372	378	1142	Larisa Latynina (URS) (9–5–4)	Larisa Latynina (URS) (9–5–4)
Handball (men, women)	1936; since 1972	15	2	28	28	28	84	Katrine Lunde (NOR) (3–0–2)	Nikola Karabatić (FRA) (3–1–0); Katrine Lunde (NOR) (3–0–2); Andrey Lavrov (RUS) (3–0–1)
Judo	1964; since 1972	15	15	167	166	334	667	Teddy Riner (FRA) (5–0–2)	Teddy Riner (FRA) (5–0–2)
Lacrosse	1904–1908, 2028	2	0	2	2	1	5	see list	see list
Modern pentathlon	Since 1912	26	2	44	44	44	132	Pavel Lednyov (URS) (2–2–3)	András Balczó (HUN) (3–2–0)
Rowing (men, women)	Since 1900	29	14	282	282	286	850	Elisabeta Lipă (ROU) (5–2–1)	Elisabeta Lipă (ROU) (5–2–1); Georgeta Damian (ROU) (5–0–1); Steve Redgrave (GBR) (5–0–1)
Rugby	1900; 1908; 1920; 1924; (Rugby sevens from 2016)	7	2	10	11	7	28	Theresa Fitzpatrick (NZL) (2–1–0); Sarah Hirini (NZL) (2–1–0); Tyla King (NZL) (2–1–0); Jerry Tuwai (FIJ) (2–1–0); Portia Woodman (NZL) (2–1–0)	Theresa Fitzpatrick (NZL) (2–1–0); Sarah Hirini (NZL) (2–1–0); Tyla King (NZL) (2–1–0); Jerry Tuwai (FIJ) (2–1–0); Portia Woodman (NZL) (2–1–0); Michaela Blyde (NZL) (2–0–0) (Australia) / Daniel Carroll (USA)/(AUS) (2–0–0); Charles Doe (USA) (2–0–0); Joseph Hunter (USA) (2–0–0); Charles Lee Tilden, Jr. (USA) (2–0–0); Charles Mehan (USA) (2–0–0); John O'Neil (USA) (2–0–0); John Patrick (USA) (2–0–0); Risi Pouri-Lane (NZL) (2–0–0); Alena Saili (NZL) (2–0–0); Rudolph Scholz (USA) (2–0–0); Colby Slater (USA) (2–0–0); Stacey Waaka (NZL) (2–0–0)
Sailing	1900; since 1908	29	10	205	197	190	592	Ben Ainslie (GBR) (4–1–0); Robert Scheidt (BRA) (2–2–1); Torben Grael (BRA) (2–1–2)	Ben Ainslie (GBR) (4–1–0); Paul Elvstrøm (DEN) (4–0–0)
Shooting	1896; 1900; 1908–1924; since 1932	28	15	302	303	301	906	Carl Osburn (USA) (5–4–2)	Carl Osburn (USA) (5–4–2); Willis Augustus Lee (USA) (5–1–1); Ole Lilloe-Olsen (NOR) (5–1–0); Alfred Lane (USA) (5–0–1); Morris Fisher (USA) (5–0–0)
Skateboarding	Since 2020	2	4	8	8	8	24	Yuto Horigome (JPN) (2–0–0); Keegan Palmer (AUS) (2–0–0); Kokona Hiraki (JPN) (0–2–0); Rayssa Leal (BRA) (0–1–1); Jagger Eaton (USA) (0–1–1); Sky Brown (GBR) (0–0–2)	Yuto Horigome (JPN) (2–0–0); Keegan Palmer (AUS) (2–0–0)
Sport climbing	Since 2020	2	4	6	6	6	18	Janja Garnbret (SLO) (2–0–0); Jakob Schubert (AUT) (0–0–2)	Janja Garnbret (SLO) (2–0–0)
Surfing	Since 2020	2	2	4	4	4	12	see list	Italo Ferreira (BRA) (1–0–0); Kauli Vaast (FRA) (1–0–0); Carissa Moore (USA) (1–0–0); Caroline Marks (USA) (1–0–0)
Swimming (men, women)	Since 1896	30	37	633	632	631	1896	Michael Phelps (USA) (23–3–2)	Michael Phelps (USA) (23–3–2)
Table tennis	Since 1988	10	5	42	42	46	130	Ma Long (CHN) (6–0–0); Dimitrij Ovtcharov (GER) (0–2–4)	Ma Long (CHN) (6–0–0)
Taekwondo	Since 2000	7	8	56	56	96	208	Hwang Kyung-seon (KOR) (2–0–1); Steven López (USA) (2–0–1); Hadi Saei (IRI) (2–0–1); Panipak Wongpattanakit (THA) (2–0–1); María Espinoza (MEX) (1–1–1)	Hwang Kyung-seon (KOR) (2–0–1); Steven López (USA) (2–0–1); Hadi Saei (IRI) (2–0–1); Panipak Wongpattanakit (THA) (2–0–1); Chen Zhong (CHN) (2–0–0); Jade Jones (GBR) (2–0–0); Milica Mandić (SRB) (2–0–0); Ulugbek Rashitov (UZB) (2–0–0); Wu Jingyu (CHN) (2–0–0)
Tennis	1896–1924; since 1988	17	5	76	76	91	243	Venus Williams (USA) (4–1–0); Kitty McKane (GBR) (1–2–2)	Venus Williams (USA) (4–1–0); Serena Williams (USA) (4–0–0)
Triathlon	Since 2000	7	2	16	16	16	48	Alex Yee (GBR) (2–1–1)	Alex Yee (GBR) (2–1–1); Alistair Brownlee (GBR) (2–0–0)
Volleyball	Since 1964	16	4	48	48	48	144	Ana Fernández (CUB) (3–0–1); Inna Ryskal (URS) (2–2–0); Sérgio Santos (BRA) (2–2–0); Jordan Larson (USA) (1–2–1); Sergey Tetyukhin (RUS) (1–1–2); Samuele Papi (ITA) (0–2–2); Kerri Walsh Jennings (USA) (3–0–1)	Ana Fernández (CUB) (3–0–1); Regla Bell (CUB) (3–0–0); Marlenis Costa (CUB) (3–0–0); Idalmis Gato (CUB) (3–0–0); Lilia Izquierdo (CUB) (3–0–0); Karch Kiraly (USA) (3–0–0); Mireya Luis (CUB) (3–0–0); Regla Torres (CUB) (3–0–0); Kerri Walsh Jennings (USA) (3–0–1); Misty May-Treanor (USA) (3–0–0)
Water polo (men, women)	1900; since 1908	28	2	36	35	35	106	Dezső Gyarmati (HUN) (3–1–1)	Dezső Gyarmati (HUN) (3–1–1); György Kárpáti (HUN) (3–0–1); Dušan Mandić (SRB) (3–0–1); Tibor Benedek (HUN) (3–0–0); Péter Biros (HUN) (3–0–0); Nikola Jakšić (SRB) (3–0–0); Tamás Kásás (HUN) (3–0–0); Gergely Kiss (HUN) (3–0–0); Tamás Molnár (HUN) (3–0–0); Paulo Radmilovic (GBR) (3–0–0); Sava Ranđelović (SRB) (3–0–0); Melissa Seidemann (USA) (3–0–0); Charles Smith (GBR) (3–0–0); Maggie Steffens (USA) (3–0–0); Zoltán Szécsi (HUN) (3–0–0)
Weightlifting	1896; 1904; since 1920	27	10	238	235	236	709	Pyrros Dimas (GRE) (3–0–1); Ronny Weller (GER) (1–2–1); Nikolaj Pešalov (BUL, CRO) (1–1–2); Norbert Schemansky (USA) (1–1–2); Eko Yuli Irawan (INA) (0–2–2)	Pyrros Dimas (GRE) (3–0–1); Kakhi Kakhiashvili (GRE) (3–0–0); Halil Mutlu (TUR) (3–0–0); Naim Süleymanoğlu (TUR) (3–0–0); Lasha Talakhadze (GEO) (3–0–0)
Wrestling (freestyle, Greco-Roman)	1896; since 1904	29	18	446	446	536	1428	Mijaín López (CUB) (5–0–0); Wilfried Dietrich (FRG) (1–2–2)	Mijaín López (CUB) (5–0–0)

=== Winter Olympic sports ===
Sports that appeared in the 2026 Winter Olympics are listed below.

Discipline (link to medalists list)	Contested	Number of		Medals awarded				Athlete(s) with the most medals (gold-silver-bronze)	Athlete(s) with the most gold medals
Discipline (link to medalists list)	Contested	Olympics (up to 2026)	Medal events (in 2026)	1st place, gold medalist(s)	2nd place, silver medalist(s)	3rd place, bronze medalist(s)	Total	Athlete(s) with the most medals (gold-silver-bronze)	Athlete(s) with the most gold medals
Alpine skiing	Since 1936	22	10	175	178	171	524	Kjetil André Aamodt (NOR) (4–2–2)	Kjetil André Aamodt (NOR) (4–2–2); Janica Kostelić (CRO) (4–2–0)
Biathlon	1924 (Note: Including military patrol event at 1924 Games, which IOC now refers to biathlon.); since 1960	22	11	108	108	106	355	Ole Einar Bjørndalen (NOR) (8–4–2)	Ole Einar Bjørndalen (NOR) (8–4–2)
Bobsleigh	1924–1956; since 1964	24	5	57	54	455	166	Bogdan Musioł (GDR) (1–5–1)	Thorsten Margis (GER) (5–0–0)
Cross-country skiing	Since 1924	25	12	182	180	182	544	Marit Bjørgen (NOR) (8–4–3)	Johannes Høsflot Klæbo (NOR) (11–1–1)
Curling	1924; since 1998	9	3	20	20	20	60	Agnes Knochenhauer (SWE) (2–1–1); Oskar Eriksson (SWE) (1–1–2)	Agnes Knochenhauer (SWE) (2–1–1); Rasmus Wranå (SWE) (2–1–0); Anna Hasselborg (SWE) (2–0–1); Marc Kennedy (CAN) (2–0–1); Sara McManus (SWE) (2–0–1); Sofia Scharback (SWE) (2–0–1); Ben Hebert (CAN) (2–0–0); Brad Jacobs (CAN) (2–0–0); Kaitlyn Lawes (CAN) (2–0–0); Anna Le Moine (SWE) (2–0–0); Cathrine Lindahl (SWE) (2–0–0); Eva Lund (SWE) (2–0–0); John Morris (CAN) (2–0–0); Anette Norberg (SWE) (2–0–0)
Figure skating	Summer: 1908; 1920; Winter: since 1924 (Note: Figure skating was held at the 1908 and 1920 Summer Olympic games prior to the establishment of the Winter Olympics. 21 medals (seven of each color) were awarded in seven events.)	25	5	101	100	100	301	Scott Moir (CAN) (3–2–0); Tessa Virtue (CAN) (3–2–0)	Scott Moir (CAN) (3–2–0); Tessa Virtue (CAN) (3–2–0); Gillis Grafström (SWE) (3–1–0); Sonja Henie (NOR) (3–0–0); Irina Rodnina (URS) (3–0–0)
Freestyle skiing	Since 1992	10	15	73	73	74	220	Ailing Eileen Gu (CHN) (3–3–0)	Ailing Eileen Gu (CHN) (3–3–0)
Ice hockey	Summer: 1920; Winter: since 1924 (Note: A men's ice hockey tournament was held at the 1920 Summer Olympics, and then added as a Winter Olympics event. Three medals were awarded.)	25	2	34	34	34	102	Jayna Hefford (CAN) (4–1–0); Hayley Wickenheiser (CAN) (4–1–0); Marie-Philip Poulin (CAN) (3–2–0); Hilary Knight (USA) (2–3–0)	Jayna Hefford (CAN) (4–1–0); Hayley Wickenheiser (CAN) (4–1–0); Caroline Ouellette (CAN) (4–0–0)
Luge	Since 1964	17	5	57	55	56	168	Tobias Arlt (GER) (7–0–1); Tobias Wendl (GER) (7–0–1)	Tobias Arlt (GER) (7–0–1); Tobias Wendl (GER) (7–0–1)
Nordic combined	Since 1924	25	3	43	43	43	129	Eric Frenzel (GER) (3–2–2); Felix Gottwald (AUT) (3–1–3)	Jørgen Graabak (NOR) (4–2–0); Jens Lurås Oftebro (NOR) (4–1–0)
Short track speed skating	Since 1992	11	9	74	74	74	222	Arianna Fontana (ITA) (3–6–5)	Viktor Ahn (RUS) / Ahn Hyun-soo (KOR) (6–0–2)
Skeleton	1924; 1948; since 2002	9	3	17	17	17	51	Christopher Grotheer (GER) (1–0–2); Axel Jungk (GER) (0–3–0); Jacqueline Pfeifer (GER) (0–1–2)	Matt Weston (GBR) (2–0–0); Lizzy Yarnold (GBR) (2–0–0)
Ski jumping	Since 1924	25	6	60	61	60	181	Matti Nykänen (FIN) (4–1–0)	Matti Nykänen (FIN) (4–1–0); Simon Ammann (SUI) (4–0–0)
Ski mountaineering	Since 2026	3	3	3	3	3	9	see list	see list
Snowboarding	Since 1998	8	11	62	62	62	186	Zoi Sadowski-Synnott (NZL) (1–3–1)	Shaun White (USA) (3–0–0)
Speed skating	Since 1924	25	14	224	223	214	661	Ireen Wüst (NED) (6–5–2)	Ireen Wüst (NED) (6–5–2); Lidiya Skoblikova (URS) (6–0–0)

=== Discontinued summer sports ===
Discipline	Contested	Number of Olympics	Medals awarded			
Discipline	Contested	Number of Olympics	1st place, gold medalist(s)	2nd place, silver medalist(s)	3rd place, bronze medalist(s)	Total
Basque pelota	1900	1	1	0	0	1
Breaking	2024	1	2	2	2	6
Croquet	1900	1	3	2	2	7
Jeu de paume	1908	1	1	1	1	3
Karate	2020	1	8	8	16	32
Polo	1900; 1908; 1920; 1924; 1936	5	5	6	5	16
Rackets	1908	1	2	2	3	7
Roque	1904	1	1	1	1	3
Tug of war	1900–1920	5	5	5	3	13
Water motorsports	1908	1	3	0	0	3

== Medalist with most medals by Olympiad ==
=== Summer Olympic Games ===
Games	Medal		Host	Number of medal events	Medals awarded				Athlete(s) with the most medals (gold–silver–bronze)	Athlete(s) with the most gold medals
Games	Medal		Host	Number of medal events	1st place, gold medalist(s)	2nd place, silver medalist(s)	3rd place, bronze medalist(s)	Total	Athlete(s) with the most medals (gold–silver–bronze)	Athlete(s) with the most gold medals
1896	winners	table	Athens, Greece	43	43	43	36	122	Hermann Weingärtner (GER) (3–2–1)	Carl Schuhmann (GER) (4–0–0)
1900	winners	table	Paris, France	95 (Note: The IOC overview web page for the 1900 Olympic Games gives a figure of 96 events, while the IOC database for the 1900 Olympic Games lists 95.)	96	95	93	284	Irving Baxter (USA) (2–3–0); Walter Tewksbury (USA) (2–2–1)	Alvin Kraenzlein (USA) (4–0–0)
1904	winners	table	St. Louis, United States	95 (Note: The IOC overview web page for the 1904 Olympic Games gives a figure of 95 events; the IOC database for the 1904 Olympic Games also lists 95.)	96	96	93	285	Anton Heida (USA) (5–1–0); George Eyser (USA) (3–2–1); Burton Downing (USA) (2–3–1)	Anton Heida (USA) (5–1–0)
1908	winners	table	London, United Kingdom	110	110	107	107	324	Mel Sheppard (USA) (3–0–0); Henry Taylor (GBR) (3–0–0); Benjamin Jones (GBR) (2–1–0); Oscar Swahn (SWE) (2–0–1); Martin Sheridan (USA) (2–0–1); Josiah Ritchie (GBR) (1–1–1); Ted Ranken (GBR) (0–3–0)	Mel Sheppard (USA) (3–0–0); Henry Taylor (GBR) (3–0–0)
1912	winners	table	Stockholm, Sweden	102	103	104	103	310	Vilhelm Carlberg (SWE) (3–2–0)	Vilhelm Carlberg (SWE) (3–2–0); Hannes Kolehmainen (FIN) (3–1–0); Alfred Lane (USA) (3–0–0)
1920	winners	table	Antwerp, Belgium	156 (Note: The IOC overview web page for the 1920 Olympic Games gives a figure of 156 events; the IOC database for the 1920 Olympic Games also lists 156.)	156	147	136	439	Willis Lee (USA) (5–1–1); Lloyd Spooner (USA) (4–1–2)	Willis Lee (USA) (5–1–1); Nedo Nadi (ITA) (5–0–0)
1924	winners	table	Paris, France	126	126	127	125	378	Ville Ritola (FIN) (4–2–0)	Paavo Nurmi (FIN) (5–0–0)
1928	winners	table	Amsterdam, Netherlands	109	110	108	109	327	Georges Miez (SUI) (3–1–0); Hermann Hänggi (SUI) (2–1–1)	Georges Miez (SUI) (3–1–0)
1932	winners	table	Los Angeles, United States	116	116	116	114	346	István Pelle (HUN) (2–2–0); Giulio Gaudini (ITA) 0–3–1); Heikki Savolainen (FIN) (0–1–3)	Helene Madison (USA) (3–0–0); Romeo Neri (ITA) (3–0–0)
1936	winners	table	Berlin, Germany	129	130	128	130	388	Konrad Frey (GER) (3–1–2)	Jesse Owens (USA) (4–0–0)
1948	winners	table	London, United Kingdom	136	138	135	138	411	Veikko Huhtanen (FIN) (3–1–1)	Fanny Blankers-Koen (NED) (4–0–0)
1952	winners	table	Helsinki, Finland	149	149	152	158	459	Maria Gorokhovskaya (URS) (2–5–0)	Viktor Chukarin (URS) (4–2–0)
1956	winners	table	Melbourne, Australia; Stockholm, Sweden (Note: Due to Australian quarantine laws, 6 equestrian events were held in Stockholm several months before the rest of the 1956 Games in Melbourne.)	151 (Note: The IOC overview web page for the 1956 Olympic Games gives a figure of 151 events; (145 events in Melbourne and 6 equestrian events in Stockholm).)	153	153	163	469	Ágnes Keleti (HUN) (4–2–0); Larisa Latynina (URS) (4–1–1)	Ágnes Keleti (HUN) (4–2–0); Larisa Latynina (URS) (4–1–1)
1960	winners	table	Rome, Italy	150	152	149	160	461	Boris Shakhlin (URS) (4–2–1)	Boris Shakhlin (URS) (4–2–1)
1964	winners	table	Tokyo, Japan	163	163	167	174	504	Larisa Latynina (URS) (2–2–2)	Don Schollander (USA) (4–0–0)
1968	winners	table	Mexico City, Mexico	172	174	170	183	527	Mikhail Voronin (URS) (2–4–1)	Věra Čáslavská (TCH) (4–2–0); Akinori Nakayama (JPN) (4–1–1)
1972	winners	table	Munich, West Germany	195	195	195	210	600	Mark Spitz (USA) (7–0–0)	Mark Spitz (USA) (7–0–0)
1976	winners	table	Montreal, Quebec, Canada	198	198	199	216	613	Nikolai Andrianov (URS) (4–2–1)	Nikolai Andrianov (URS) (4–2–1); Kornelia Ender (GDR) (4–1–0); John Naber (USA) (4–1–0)
1980	winners	table	Moscow, Soviet Union	203	204	204	223	631	Alexander Dityatin (URS) (3–4–1)	Alexander Dityatin (URS) (3–4–1); Caren Metschuck (GDR) (3–1–0); Barbara Krause (GDR) (3–0–0); Vladimir Parfenovich (URS) (3–0–0); Rica Reinisch (GDR) (3–0–0); Vladimir Salnikov (URS) (3–0–0)
1984	winners	table	Los Angeles, United States	221	226	219	243	688	Li Ning (CHN) (3–2–1)	Ecaterina Szabo (ROU) (4–1–0); Carl Lewis (USA) (4–0–0)
1988	winners	table	Seoul, South Korea	237	241	234	264	739	Matt Biondi (USA) (5–1–1)	Kristin Otto (GDR) (6–0–0)
1992	winners	table	Barcelona, Spain	257	260	257	298	815	Vitaly Scherbo (EUN) (6–0–0)	Vitaly Scherbo (EUN) (6–0–0)
1996	winners	table	Atlanta, United States	271	271	273	298	842	Alexei Nemov (RUS) (2–1–3)	Amy Van Dyken (USA) (4–0–0)
2000	winners	table	Sydney, Australia	300	300	300	327	927	Alexei Nemov (RUS) (2–1–3)	Ian Thorpe (AUS) (3–2–0); Inge de Bruijn (NED) (3–1–0); Leontien Zijlaard-van Moorsel (NED) (3–1–0); Jenny Thompson (USA) (3–0–1); Lenny Krayzelburg (USA) (3–0–0)
2004	winners	table	Athens, Greece	301	301	300	326	927	Michael Phelps (USA) (6–0–2)	Michael Phelps (USA) (6–0–2)
2008	winners	table	Beijing, China	302	302	303	353	958	Michael Phelps (USA) (8–0–0)	Michael Phelps (USA) (8–0–0)
2012	winners	table	London, United Kingdom	302	302	301	357	960	Michael Phelps (USA) (4–2–0)	Michael Phelps (USA) (4–2–0); Missy Franklin (USA) (4–0–1)
2016	winners	table	Rio de Janeiro, Brazil	306	307	307	359	973	Michael Phelps (USA) (5–1–0)	Michael Phelps (USA) (5–1–0)
2020	winners	table	Tokyo, Japan	339	340	338	402	1,080	Emma McKeon (AUS) (4–0–3)	Caeleb Dressel (USA) (5–0–0)
2024	winners	table	Paris, France	329	329	330	385	1,044	Zhang Yufei (CHN) (0–1–5)	Léon Marchand (FRA) (4–0–1)

=== Winter Olympic Games ===
Games	Medal		Host	Number of medal events	Medals awarded				Athlete(s) with the most medals (gold–silver–bronze)	Athlete(s) with the most gold medals
Games	Medal		Host	Number of medal events	1st place, gold medalist(s)	2nd place, silver medalist(s)	3rd place, bronze medalist(s)	Total	Athlete(s) with the most medals (gold–silver–bronze)	Athlete(s) with the most gold medals
1924	winners	table	Chamonix, France	16	16	16	17	49	Clas Thunberg (FIN) (3–1–1); Roald Larsen (NOR) (0–2–3)	Clas Thunberg (FIN) (3–1–1); Thorleif Haug (NOR) (3–0–0)
1928	winners	table	St. Moritz, Switzerland	14	14	12	15	41	Bernt Evensen (NOR) (1–1–1)	Johan Grøttumsbraaten (NOR) (2–0–0); Clas Thunberg (FIN) (2–0–0)
1932	winners	table	Lake Placid, United States	14	14	14	14	42	Irving Jaffee (USA) (2–0–0); Jack Shea (USA) (2–0–0); Veli Saarinen (FIN) (1–0–1); Alexander Hurd (CAN) (0–1–1); Willy Logan (CAN) (0–0–2)	Irving Jaffee (USA) (2–0–0); Jack Shea (USA) (2–0–0)
1936	winners	table	Garmisch-Partenkirchen, Germany	17	17	17	17	51	Ivar Ballangrud (NOR) (3–1–0)	Ivar Ballangrud (NOR) (3–1–0)
1948	winners	table	St. Moritz, Switzerland	22	22	24	22	68	Henri Oreiller (FRA) (2–0–1)	Henri Oreiller (FRA) (2–0–1); Martin Lundström (SWE) (2–0–0)
1952	winners	table	Oslo, Norway	22	22	22	23	67	Hjalmar Andersen (NOR) (3–0–0); Annemarie Buchner (GER) (0–1–2)	Hjalmar Andersen (NOR) (3–0–0)
1956	winners	table	Cortina d'Ampezzo, Italy	24	25	23	24	72	Sixten Jernberg (SWE) (1–2–1)	Toni Sailer (AUT) (3–0–0)
1960	winners	table	Squaw Valley, United States	27	28	26	27	81	Veikko Hakulinen (FIN) (1–1–1)	Yevgeny Grishin (URS) (2–0–0); Lidiya Skoblikova (URS) (2–0–0)
1964	winners	table	Innsbruck, Austria	34	34	38	31	103	Lidiya Skoblikova (URS) (4–0–0)	Lidiya Skoblikova (URS) (4–0–0)
1968	winners	table	Grenoble, France	35	35	39	32	106	Jean-Claude Killy (FRA) (3–0–0); Toini Gustafsson (SWE) (2–1–0); Eero Mäntyranta (FIN) (0–1–2)	Jean-Claude Killy (FRA) (3–0–0)
1972	winners	table	Sapporo, Japan	35	36	34	35	105	Galina Kulakova (URS) (3–0–0); Ard Schenk (NED) (3–0–0); Vyacheslav Vedenin (URS) (2–0–1); Pål Tyldum (NOR) (1–2–0); Marjatta Kajosmaa (FIN) (0–2–1); Atje Keulen-Deelstra (NED) (0–1–2)	Galina Kulakova (URS) (3–0–0); Ard Schenk (NED) (3–0–0)
1976	winners	table	Innsbruck, Austria	37	37	37	37	111	Tatyana Averina (URS) (2–0–2)	Rosi Mittermaier (FRG) (2–1–0); Raisa Smetanina (URS) (2–1–0); Tatyana Averina (URS) (2–0–2); Bernhard Germeshausen (GDR) (2–0–0); Nikolay Kruglov (URS) (2–0–0); Meinhard Nehmer (GDR) (2–0–0)
1980	winners	table	Lake Placid, United States	38	38	39	38	115	Eric Heiden (USA) (5–0–0)	Eric Heiden (USA) (5–0–0)
1984	winners	table	(Socialist Federal Republic of Yugoslavia) Sarajevo, Yugoslavia	39	39	39	39	117	Marja-Liisa Hämäläinen (FIN) (3–0–1); Karin Enke (GDR) (2–2–0); Gunde Svan (SWE) (2–1–1)	Marja-Liisa Hämäläinen (FIN) (3–0–1)
1988	winners	table	Calgary, Canada	46	46	46	46	138	Yvonne van Gennip (NED) (3–0–0); Matti Nykänen (FIN) (3–0–0); Tamara Tikhonova (URS) (2–1–0); Valeriy Medvedtsev (URS) (1–2–0); Marjo Matikainen (FIN) (1–0–2); Karin Enke (GDR) (0–2–1); Andrea Ehrig (GDR) (0–2–1); Vladimir Smirnov (URS) (0–2–1)	Yvonne van Gennip (NED) (3–0–0); Matti Nykänen (FIN) (3–0–0)
1992	winners	table	Albertville, France	57	57	58	56	171	Lyubov Yegorova (EUN) (3–2–0); Yelena Välbe (EUN) (1–0–4)	Lyubov Yegorova (EUN) (3–2–0); Bjørn Dæhlie (NOR) (3–1–0); Vegard Ulvang (NOR) (3–1–0)
1994	winners	table	Lillehammer, Norway	61	61	61	61	183	Manuela Di Centa (ITA) (2–2–1)	Lyubov Yegorova (RUS) (3–1–0); Johann Olav Koss (NOR) (3–0–0)
1998	winners	table	Nagano, Japan	68	69	68	68	205	Larisa Lazutina (RUS) (3–1–1)	Larisa Lazutina (RUS) (3–1–1); Bjørn Dæhlie (NOR) (3–1–0)
2002	winners	table	Salt Lake City, United States	78	80	76	78	234	Ole Einar Bjørndalen (NOR) (4–0–0); Janica Kostelić (CRO) (3–1–0)	Ole Einar Bjørndalen (NOR) (4–0–0)
2006	winners	table	Turin, Italy	84	84	84	84	252	Cindy Klassen (CAN) (1–2–2)	Ahn Hyun-soo (KOR) (3–0–1); Michael Greis (GER) (3–0–0); Jin Sun-yu (KOR) (3–0–0)
2010	winners	table	Vancouver, Canada	86	86	87	85	258	Marit Bjørgen (NOR) (3–1–1)	Marit Bjørgen (NOR) (3–1–1); Wang Meng (CHN) (3–0–0)
2014	winners	table	Sochi, Russia	98	99	97	99	295	Ireen Wüst (NED) (2–3–0)	Viktor Ahn (RUS) (3–0–1); Marit Bjørgen (NOR) (3–0–0); Darya Domracheva (BLR) (3–0–0)
2018	winners	table	Pyeongchang, South Korea	102	103	102	102	307	Marit Bjørgen (NOR) (2–1–2)	Martin Fourcade (FRA) (3–0–0); Johannes Høsflot Klæbo (NOR) (3–0–0)
2022	winners	table	Beijing, China	109	109	109	110	327	Johannes Thingnes Bø (NOR) (4–0–1); Alexander Bolshunov (ROC) (3–1–1); Marte Olsbu Røiseland (NOR) (3–0–2); Quentin Fillon Maillet (FRA) (2–3–0)	Johannes Thingnes Bø (NOR) (4–0–1)
2026	winners	table	Milan/Cortina d'Ampezzo, Italy	116	116	118	115	349	Johannes Høsflot Klæbo (NOR) (6–0–0)	Johannes Høsflot Klæbo (NOR) (6–0–0)

== Medalists by age ==
Title	Age	Medalist	Details	Notes
Freestyle skiing
Youngest freestyle skiing medalist	18 years 158 days	Ailing Eileen Gu		
Youngest freestyle skiing gold medalist	18 years 158 days	Ailing Eileen Gu		
Youngest female freestyle skiing medalist	18 years 158 days	Ailing Eileen Gu		
Youngest female freestyle skiing gold medalist	18 years 158 days	Ailing Eileen Gu	At the 2022 Winter Olympics, Ailing Eileen Gu became the youngest freestyle skiing gold medalist. In the women's big air, she finished the first with an astonishing score, 188.25.	
Biathlon
Oldest biathlon medalist	40	Ole Einar Bjørndalen		
Oldest biathlon gold medalist	40	Ole Einar Bjørndalen		
Oldest male biathlon medalist	40	Ole Einar Bjørndalen		
Oldest male biathlon gold medalist	40	Ole Einar Bjørndalen	At 2014 Winter Olympics, Ole Einar Bjørndalen won gold at the 10 km sprint biathlon event, tying the record number of total medals in the Winter Olympics at 12, along with Bjørn Dæhlie, and becoming the oldest Winter Olympics medalist at age 40.	
Skeleton
Oldest skeleton gold medalist	39	Duff Gibson		
Oldest male skeleton gold medalist	39	Duff Gibson	At the 2006 Winter Olympics, Duff Gibson became the oldest Winter Games gold medalist by winning gold in skeleton. He has subsequently been eclipsed as the oldest gold medalist at the Winter Games.	
Luge
Youngest luge gold medalist	20	Felix Loch		
Youngest male luge gold medalist	20	Felix Loch	At the 2010 Winter Olympics, he became the youngest ever Olympic luge gold medalist.	
Cycling
Oldest cycling gold medalist	42	Kristin Armstrong	At the 2012 Summer Olympics, she became the oldest cycling gold medalist, when she won the women's road time trial race, defending her gold medal from Beijing 2008. She repeated her success at the 2016 Summer Olympics, winning third gold in a row and setting a new record.	
Oldest female cycling gold medalist	42	Kristin Armstrong		
Athletics
Oldest athletics medalist	48	Terence Lloyd Johnson		
Oldest athletics gold medalist	42	Pat McDonald		
Oldest male athletics medalist	48	Terence Lloyd Johnson	At the 1948 Summer Olympics, he won bronze in the men's 50 km walk.	
Oldest male athletics gold medalist	42	Pat McDonald	At the 1920 Summer Olympics, he won the men's 56 lbs toss.	
Oldest female athletics medalist	40	Merlene Ottey	At the 2000 Summer Olympics, she won bronze in the women's 100m dash.	
Oldest female athletics gold medalist	39	Ellina Zvereva	At the 2000 Summer Olympics, she won gold for the discus throw.	
Swimming
Oldest swimming medalist	41	Dara Torres	Torres won silver for the women's 4x100 freestyle team relay as anchor at the 2008 Summer Olympics.	
Oldest male swimming medalist	38	William Robinson	Robinson won silver for the men's 200m breaststroke at the 1908 Summer Olympics.	
Oldest female swimming medalist	41	Dara Torres		
Sailing
Oldest male sailing gold medalist	54	Santiago Lange	Lange won gold for the Nacra 17 at the 2016 Summer Olympics.	

== Lists ==
=== Multiple ===
- List of multiple Olympic gold medalists
- List of multiple Olympic gold medalists at a single Games
- List of multiple Olympic gold medalists in one event
- List of multiple Olympic medalists
- List of multiple Olympic medalists at a single Games
- List of multiple Olympic medalists in one event

=== By sport ===
- List of Olympic medalists in handball (men)
- List of Olympic medalists in handball (women)
- List of Olympic medalists in swimming (men)
- List of Olympic medalists in swimming (women)
- List of individual gold medalists in swimming at the Olympics and World Aquatics Championships (men)
- List of individual gold medalists in swimming at the Olympics and World Aquatics Championships (women)
- List of Olympic gold medalists in swimming by count
- List of Olympic records in swimming
- List of Olympic medalists in artistic swimming
- List of Olympic medalists in water polo (men)
- List of Olympic medalists in water polo (women)

== See also ==
- List of athletes with the most appearances at Olympic Games
- List of Australian Olympic medallists in swimming
- List of Olympic medalists in art competitions
- Lists of Paralympic medalists
- List of sport awards
