= Speed skating at the 1972 Winter Olympics – Women's 500 metres =

Women's 500 metres at the XI Olympic Winter Games
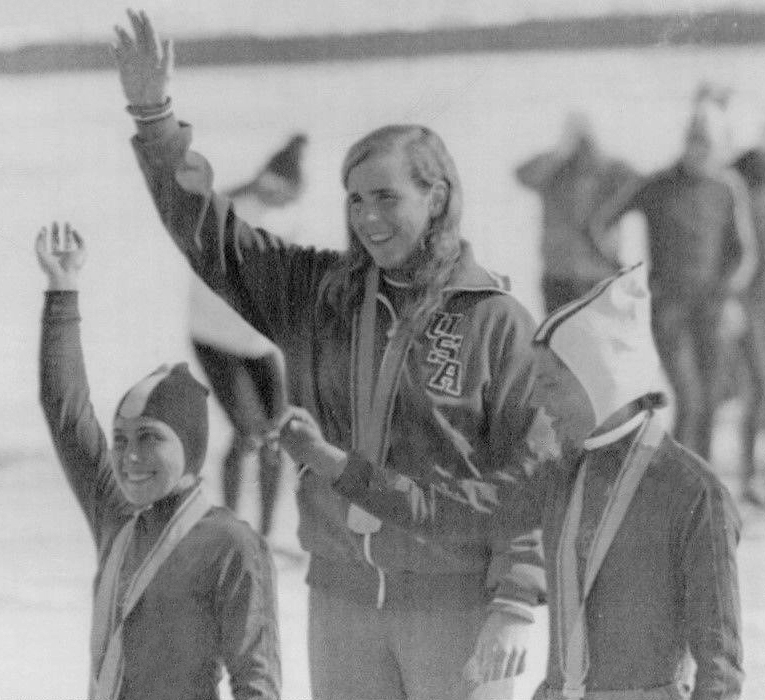
- Left-right: Krasnova, Henning, Titova
- Venue: Makomanai Open Stadium
- Dates: February 10, 1972
- Competitors: 29 from 12 nations
- Winning time: 43.33

Medalists
1st place, gold medalist(s)		Anne Henning	United States
2nd place, silver medalist(s)		Vera Krasnova	Soviet Union
3rd place, bronze medalist(s)		Lyudmila Titova	Soviet Union

The women's 500 metres in speed skating at the 1972 Winter Olympics took place on 10 February, at the Makomanai Open Stadium.

16-year-old Anne Henning produced an upset by defeating her veteran Soviet counterparts and becoming the youngest women's speed skating gold medalist in Olympic history.

== Records ==
Prior to this competition, the existing world and Olympic records were as follows:

World record	Anne Henning (USA)	42.5	Davos, Switzerland	7 January 1972
Olympic record	Lidia Skoblikova (URS)	45.0	Innsbruck, Austria	30 January 1964

The following new Olympic and World records was set during the competition.

Date	Athlete	Country	Time	OR	WR
10 February	Monika Pflug	West Germany	44.75	OR	
10 February	Lyudmila Titova	Soviet Union	44.45	OR	
10 February	Anne Henning	United States	43.33	OR	

== Results ==
Rank	Athlete	Country	Time	Notes
1st place, gold medalist(s)	Anne Henning	United States	43.33	OR
2nd place, silver medalist(s)	Vera Krasnova	Soviet Union	44.01	
3rd place, bronze medalist(s)	Lyudmila Titova	Soviet Union	44.45	
4	Sheila Young	United States	44.53	
5	Monika Pflug	West Germany	44.75	
6	Atje Keulen-Deelstra	Netherlands	44.89	
7	Kay Lunda	United States	44.95	
8	Alla Butova	Soviet Union	45.17	
9	Sachiko Saito	Japan	45.35	
10	Ellie van den Brom	Netherlands	45.62	
11	Sigrid Sundby-Dybedahl	Norway	45.70	
12	Paula Dufter	West Germany	45.77	
13	Ruth Schleiermacher	East Germany	45.78	
14	Cathy Priestner	Canada	45.79	
15	Ann-Sofie Järnström	Sweden	45.83	
16	Arja Kantola	Finland	46.12	
17	Kirsti Biermann	Norway	46.18	
18	Ylva Hedlund	Sweden	46.24	
19	Lisbeth Korsmo-Berg	Norway	46.33	
20	Trijnie Rep	Netherlands	46.60	
21	Ryoko Onozawa	Japan	46.70	
22	Choi Jung-hui	South Korea	46.74	
23	Sylvia Filipsson	Sweden	46.78	
24	Tuula Vilkas	Finland	46.85	
25	Donna McCannell	Canada	47.30	
26	Lee Gyeong-hui	South Korea	47.45	
27	Monika Stützle	West Germany	48.15	
28	Tak In-suk	North Korea	55.80	
-	Sylvia Burka	Canada	DQ	

During her run, Henning had to stop to avoid a collision with Sylvia Burka at the crossover point. She still set the fastest time and a new Olympic record at 43.70. In her re-skate, which she was allowed to take according to the rules, she improved her time to 43.33, breaking the Olympic record.
