= List of ice hockey players who won the Olympic Gold and the IIHF Championship =

All Olympic gold medalists and IIHF gold medalists was found within the official IOC website, and within an online database, respectfully.

== Men ==
Players listed in this table are only those who won an Olympic gold medal from 1972 onwards, as the IIHF World Championship and the Olympic ice hockey tournament were held as separate events.

The following list was last updated until the 2026 Ice Hockey Winter Olympics.

| Player | Team | Gold medal | IIHF Championship |
|---|---|---|---|
| (Soviet Union) Vladislav Tretiak | Soviet Union | 1972, 1976, 1984 | 1970, 1971, 1973, 1974, 1975, 1978, 1979, 1981; 1982, 1983 |
| (Soviet Union) Alexander Maltsev | Soviet Union | 1972, 1976 | 1969, 1970, 1971, 1973, 1974, 1975, 1978, 1981, 1983 |
| (Soviet Union) Vladimir Petrov | Soviet Union | 1972, 1976 | 1969, 1970, 1971, 1973, 1974, 1975, 1978, 1979, 1981 |
| (Soviet Union) Alexander Yakushev | Soviet Union | 1972, 1976 | 1967, 1969, 1970, 1971, 1973, 1974, 1975, 1979 |
| (Soviet Union) Boris Mikhailov | Soviet Union | 1972, 1976 | 1969, 1970, 1971, 1973, 1974, 1975, 1978, 1979 |
| (Soviet Union) Valeri Kharlamov | Soviet Union | 1972, 1976 | 1969, 1970, 1971, 1973, 1974, 1975, 1978, 1979 |
| (Soviet Union) Vladimir Lutchenko | Soviet Union | 1972, 1976 | 1969, 1970, 1971, 1973, 1974, 1975, 1978, 1979 |
| (Soviet Union) Gennadiy Tsygankov | Soviet Union | 1972, 1976 | 1971, 1973, 1974, 1975, 1978, 1979 |
| (Soviet Union) Vladimir Shadrin | Soviet Union | 1972, 1976 | 1970, 1971, 1973, 1974, 1975 |
| (Soviet Union) Alexander Ragulin | Soviet Union | 1972 | 1963, 1965, 1966, 1967, 1969, 1970, 1971, 1973 |
| (Soviet Union) Anatoli Firsov | Soviet Union | 1972 | 1965, 1966, 1967, 1969, 1970, 1971 |
| (Soviet Union) Viktor Kuzkin | Soviet Union | 1972 | 1963, 1965, 1966, 1967, 1969, 1971 |
| (Soviet Union) Vladimir Vikulov | Soviet Union | 1972 | 1966, 1967, 1969, 1970, 1971 |
| (Soviet Union) Igor Romishevsky | Soviet Union | 1972 | 1969, 1970, 1971 |
| (Soviet Union) Alexander Pashkov | Soviet Union | 1972 | 1978 |
| (Soviet Union) Sergei Kapustin | Soviet Union | 1976 | 1974, 1975, 1978, 1979, 1981, 1982, 1983 |
| (Soviet Union) Viktor Zhluktov | Soviet Union | 1976 | 1978, 1979, 1981, 1982, 1983 |
| (Soviet Union) Sergei Babinov | Soviet Union | 1976 | 1979, 1981, 1982, 1983 |
| (Soviet Union) Yuri Lyapkin | Soviet Union | 1976 | 1971, 1973, 1974, 1975 |
| (Soviet Union) Viktor Shalimov | Soviet Union | 1976 | 1975, 1981, 1983 |
| (Soviet Union) Alexander Gusev | Soviet Union | 1976 | 1973, 1974 |
| (Soviet Union) Alexander Sidelnikov | Soviet Union | 1976 | 1973, 1974 |
| (Soviet Union) (Unified Team at the Olympics) (Russia) Andrei Khomutov | Soviet Union; Unified Team; Russia | 1984, 1988, 1992 | 1981, 1982, 1983, 1986, 1986, 1989, 1990, 1993 |
| (Soviet Union) Sergei Makarov | Soviet Union | 1984, 1988 | 1978, 1979, 1981, 1982, 1983, 1986, 1989, 1990 |
| (Soviet Union) (Russia) Viacheslav Fetisov | Soviet Union; Russia | 1984, 1988 | 1978, 1981, 1982, 1983, 1986, 1989, 1990 |
| (Soviet Union) Alexei Kasatonov | Soviet Union | 1984, 1988 | 1981, 1982, 1983, 1986; 1989 |
| (Soviet Union) Vladimir Krutov | Soviet Union | 1984, 1988 | 1981, 1982, 1983, 1986, 1989 |
| (Soviet Union) (Russia) Igor Larionov | Soviet Union; Russia | 1984, 1988 | 1982, 1983, 1986, 1989 |
| (Soviet Union) Sergei Starikov | Soviet Union | 1984, 1988 | 1979, 1983, 1986 |
| (Soviet Union) Alexander Kozhevnikov | Soviet Union | 1984, 1988 | 1982 |
| (Soviet Union) Igor Stelnov | Soviet Union | 1984, 1988 | 1986 |
| (Soviet Union) Vasili Pervukhin | Soviet Union | 1984 | 1978, 1979, 1981, 1982, 1983, 1986 |
| (Soviet Union) Vladimir Myshkin | Soviet Union | 1984 | 1979, 1981, 1982, 1983, 1989, 1990 |
| (Soviet Union) Zinetula Bilyaletdinov | Soviet Union | 1984 | 1978, 1979, 1981, 1982, 1983, 1986 |
| (Soviet Union) Alexander Skvortsov | Soviet Union | 1984 | 1979, 1981, 1983 |
| (Soviet Union) Sergei Shepelev | Soviet Union | 1984 | 1981, 1982, 1983 |
| (Soviet Union) Viktor Tyumenev | Soviet Union | 1984 | 1982, 1986, 1990 |
| (Soviet Union) Nikolai Drozdetsky | Soviet Union | 1984 | 1981, 1982 |
| (Soviet Union) Mikhail Vasiliev | Soviet Union | 1984 | 1983 |
| (Soviet Union) (Unified Team at the Olympics) (Russia) Vyacheslav Bykov | Soviet Union; Unified Team; Russia | 1988, 1992 | 1983, 1986, 1989, 1990, 1993 |
| (Soviet Union) (Unified Team at the Olympics) (Russia) Igor Kravchuk | Soviet Union; Unified Team; Russia | 1988, 1992 | 1990 |
| (Soviet Union) (Russia) Ilya Byakin | Soviet Union; Russia | 1988 | 1989, 1990, 1993 |
| (Soviet Union) Alexander Chernykh | Soviet Union | 1988 | 1989 |
| (Soviet Union) Alexei Gusarov | Soviet Union | 1988 | 1986, 1989, 1990 |
| (Soviet Union) Sergei Mylnikov | Soviet Union | 1988 | 1986, 1989, 1990 |
| (Soviet Union) Valeri Kamensky | Soviet Union | 1988 | 1986, 1989, 1990 |
| (Soviet Union) Sergei Yashin | Soviet Union | 1988 | 1986, 1989 |
| (Soviet Union) (Russia) Alexander Mogilny | Soviet Union; Russia | 1988 | 1989 |
| (Soviet Union) Sergei Svetlov | Soviet Union | 1988 | 1986 |
| (Soviet Union) (Unified Team at the Olympics) (Russia) Yuri Khmylev | Soviet Union; Unified Team; Russia | 1992 | 1986, 1989 |
| (Soviet Union) (Unified Team at the Olympics) (Russia) Andrei Trefilov | Soviet Union; Unified Team; Russia | 1992 | 1993 |
| (Soviet Union) (Unified Team at the Olympics) (Russia) Dmitri Yushkevich | Soviet Union; Unified Team; Russia | 1992 | 1993 |
| (Soviet Union) (Unified Team at the Olympics) Evgeny Davydov | Soviet Union; Unified Team | 1992 | 1990 |
| (Soviet Union) (Unified Team at the Olympics) (Russia) Sergei Petrenko | Soviet Union; Unified Team; Russia | 1992 | 1993 |
| (Soviet Union) (Unified Team at the Olympics) (Russia) Vladimir Malakhov | Soviet Union; Unified Team; Russia | 1992 | 1990 |
| (Soviet Union) (Unified Team at the Olympics) (Russia) Vyacheslav Butsayev | Soviet Union; Unified Team; Russia | 1992 | 1993 |
| (Sweden) Jörgen Jönsson | Sweden | 1994, 2006 | 1998, 2006 |
| (Sweden) Peter Forsberg | Sweden | 1994, 2006 | 1992, 1998 |
| (Sweden) Kenny Jönsson | Sweden | 1994, 2006 | 2006 |
| (Sweden) Jonas Bergqvist | Sweden | 1994 | 1987, 1991, 1998 |
| (Sweden) Fredrik Stillman | Sweden | 1994 | 1991, 1992 |
| (Sweden) Håkan Loob | Sweden | 1994 | 1987, 1991 |
| (Sweden) Charles Berglund | Sweden | 1994 | 1991 |
| (Sweden) Mats Näslund | Sweden | 1994 | 1991 |
| (Sweden) Daniel Rydmark | Sweden | 1994 | 1992 |
| (Sweden) Magnus Svensson | Sweden | 1994 | 1987 |
| (Sweden) Roger Hansson | Sweden | 1994 | 1992 |
| (Sweden) Tomas Jonsson | Sweden | 1994 | 1991 |
| (Sweden) Tommy Salo | Sweden | 1994 | 1998 |
| (Sweden) Patric Kjellberg | Sweden | 1994 | 1998 |
| (Czech Republic) Pavel Patera | Czech Republic | 1998 | 1996, 1999, 2000, 2001 |
| (Czech Republic) Martin Procházka | Czechoslovakia; Czech Republic | 1998 | 1996, 1999, 2000, 2001 |
| (Czech Republic) Martin Ručinský | Czechoslovakia; Czech Republic | 1998 | 1999, 2001, 2005 |
| (Czech Republic) Robert Reichel | Czechoslovakia; Czech Republic | 1998 | 1996, 2000, 2001 |
| (Czech Republic) Roman Čechmánek | Czechoslovakia; Czech Republic | 1998 | 1996, 1999, 2000 |
| (Czech Republic) Jaroslav Špaček | Czech Republic | 1998 | 1999, 2001, 2005 |
| (Czech Republic) Jiří Dopita | Czechoslovakia; Czech Republic | 1998 | 1996, 2000, 2001 |
| (Czech Republic) David Moravec | Czech Republic | 1998 | 1999, 2001 |
| (Czech Republic) František Kučera | Czechoslovakia; Czech Republic | 1998 | 1999, 2000 |
| (Czech Republic) Jaromír Jágr | Czechoslovakia; Czech Republic | 1998 | 2005, 2010 |
| (Czech Republic) Jan Čaloun | Czechoslovakia; Czech Republic | 1998 | 1999 |
| (Czech Republic) Jiří Šlégr | Czechoslovakia; Czech Republic | 1998 | 2005 |
| (Czech Republic) Libor Procházka | Czechoslovakia; Czech Republic | 1998 | 1999 |
| (Czech Republic) Martin Straka | Czechoslovakia; Czech Republic | 1998 | 2005 |
| (Czech Republic) Robert Lang | Czechoslovakia; Czech Republic | 1998 | 1996 |
| (Czech Republic) Vladimír Růžička | Czechoslovakia; Czech Republic | 1998 | 1985 |
| (Canada) Chris Pronger | Canada | 2002, 2010 | 1997 |
| (Canada) Jarome Iginla | Canada | 2002, 2010 | 1997 |
| (Canada) Scott Niedermayer | Canada | 2002, 2010 | 2004 |
| (Canada) Eric Brewer | Canada | 2002 | 2003, 2004, 2007 |
| (Canada) Rob Blake | Canada | 2002 | 1994, 1997 |
| (Canada) Ryan Smyth | Canada | 2002 | 2003, 2004 |
| (Canada) Brendan Shanahan | Canada | 2002 | 1994 |
| (Canada) Joe Sakic | Canada | 2002 | 1994 |
| (Canada) Owen Nolan | Canada | 2002 | 1997 |
| (Canada) Paul Kariya | Canada | 2002 | 1994 |
| (Sweden) Mats Sundin | Sweden | 2006 | 1991, 1992, 1998 |
| (Sweden) Daniel Sedin | Sweden | 2006 | 2013 |
| (Sweden) Fredrik Modin | Sweden | 2006 | 1998 |
| (Sweden) Henrik Lundqvist | Sweden | 2006 | 2017 |
| (Sweden) Henrik Sedin | Sweden | 2006 | 2013 |
| (Sweden) Henrik Zetterberg | Sweden | 2006 | 2006 |
| (Sweden) Mattias Öhlund | Sweden | 2006 | 1998 |
| (Sweden) Mika Hannula | Sweden | 2006 | 2006 |
| (Sweden) Mikael Samuelsson | Sweden | 2006 | 2006 |
| (Sweden) Nicklas Lidström | Sweden | 2006 | 1991 |
| (Sweden) Niclas Hävelid | Sweden | 2006 | 1998 |
| (Sweden) Niklas Kronwall | Sweden | 2006 | 2006 |
| (Sweden) Ronnie Sundin | Sweden | 2006 | 2006 |
| (Sweden) Stefan Liv | Sweden | 2006 | 2006 |
| (Canada) Roberto Luongo | Canada | 2010, 2014 | 2003, 2004 |
| (Canada) Corey Perry | Canada | 2010, 2014 | 2016 |
| (Canada) Jonathan Toews | Canada | 2010, 2014 | 2007 |
| (Canada) Patrice Bergeron | Canada | 2010, 2014 | 2004 |
| (Canada) Patrick Marleau | Canada | 2010, 2014 | 2003 |
| (Canada) Rick Nash | Canada | 2010, 2014 | 2007 |
| (Canada) Shea Weber | Canada | 2010, 2014 | 2007 |
| (Canada) Sidney Crosby | Canada | 2010, 2014 | 2015 |
| (Canada) Dany Heatley | Canada | 2010 | 2003, 2004 |
| (Canada) Brenden Morrow | Canada | 2010 | 2004 |
| (Canada) Eric Staal | Canada | 2010 | 2007 |
| (Canada) Dan Hamhuis | Canada | 2014 | 2007, 2015 |
| (Canada) Jay Bouwmeester | Canada | 2014 | 2003, 2004 |
| (Canada) Matt Duchene | Canada | 2014 | 2015, 2016 |
| (Canada) Mike Smith | Canada | 2014 | 2015 |
| (Russia) (International Olympic Committee) Ilya Kovalchuk | Russia; Olympic Athletes from Russia | 2018 | 2008, 2009 |
| (Russia) (International Olympic Committee) Sergei Mozyakin | Russia; Olympic Athletes from Russia | 2018 | 2008, 2009 |
| (Russia) (International Olympic Committee) Sergei Shirokov | Russia; Olympic Athletes from Russia | 2018 | 2012, 2014 |
| (Russia) (International Olympic Committee) Andrei Zubarev | Russia; Olympic Athletes from Russia | 2018 | 2014 |
| (Russia) (International Olympic Committee) Egor Yakovlev | Russia; Olympic Athletes from Russia | 2018 | 2014 |
| (Russia) (International Olympic Committee) Roberto Luongo | Russia; Olympic Athletes from Russia | 2018 | 2012 |
| (Russia) (International Olympic Committee) Sergey Kalinin | Russia; Olympic Athletes from Russia | 2018 | 2014 |
| (Russia) (International Olympic Committee) Vadim Shipachyov | Russia; Olympic Athletes from Russia | 2018 | 2014 |
| (Russia) (International Olympic Committee) Vasily Koshechkin | Russia; Olympic Athletes from Russia | 2018 | 2009 |
| (Finland) Mikko Lehtonen | Finland | 2022 | 2019, 2022, 2026 |
| (Finland) Sakari Manninen | Finland | 2022 | 2019, 2022, 2026 |
| (Finland) Atte Ohtamaa | Finland | 2022 | 2019, 2022 |
| (Finland) Harri Pesonen | Finland | 2022 | 2019, 2022 |
| (Finland) Juho Olkinuora | Finland | 2022 | 2019, 2022 |
| (Finland) Marko Anttila | Finland | 2022 | 2019, 2022 |
| (Finland) Toni Rajala | Finland | 2022 | 2019, 2022 |
| (Finland) Saku Mäenalanen | Finland | 2022 | 2022, 2026 |
| (Finland) Harri Säteri | Finland | 2022 | 2022, 2026 |
| (Finland) Frans Tuohimaa | Finland | 2022 | 2022 |
| (Finland) Hannes Björninen | Finland | 2022 | 2022 |
| (Finland) Juuso Hietanen | Finland | 2022 | 2022 |
| (Finland) Leo Komarov | Finland | 2022 | 2011 |
| (Finland) Niklas Friman | Finland | 2022 | 2022 |
| (Finland) Niko Ojamäki | Finland | 2022 | 2019 |
| (Finland) Petteri Lindbohm | Finland | 2022 | 2019 |
| (Finland) Sami Vatanen | Finland | 2022 | 2022 |
| (Finland) Teemu Hartikainen | Finland | 2022 | 2022 |
| (Finland) Valtteri Filppula | Finland | 2022 | 2022 |
| (Finland) Ville Pokka | Finland | 2022 | 2022 |
| (United States) Clayton Keller | United States | 2026 | 2025 |
| (United States) Jackson LaCombe | United States | 2026 | 2025 |
| (United States) Jeremy Swayman | United States | 2026 | 2025 |
| (United States) Tage Thompson | United States | 2026 | 2025 |
| (United States) Zach Werenski | United States | 2026 | 2025 |

== Women ==
Players listed in this table are only those who won an Olympic gold medal and the IIHF World Championship.

The following list was last updated until the 2026 Ice Hockey Winter Olympics.

| Player | Team | Gold medal | IIHF Championship |
|---|---|---|---|
| (United States) Jenny Schmidgall-Potter | United States | 1998 | 2005, 2008, 2009, 2011 |
| (United States) Angela Ruggiero | United States | 1998 | 2005, 2008, 2009, 2011 |
| (United States) Cammi Granato | United States | 1998 | 2005 |
| (United States) Katie King-Crowley | United States | 1998 | 2005 |
| (United States) Shelley Looney | United States | 1998 | 2005 |
| (Canada) Jayna Hefford | Canada | 2002, 2006, 2010, 2014 | 1997, 1999, 2000, 2001, 2004, 2007, 2012 |
| (Canada) Hayley Wickenheiser | Canada | 2002, 2006, 2010, 2014 | 1994, 1997, 1999, 2000, 2004, 2007, 2012 |
| (Canada) Caroline Ouellette | Canada | 2002, 2006, 2010, 2014 | 1999, 2000, 2001, 2004, 2007, 2012 |
| (Canada) Jennifer Botterill | Canada | 2002, 2006, 2010 | 1999, 2000, 2001, 2004, 2007 |
| (Canada) Kim St-Pierre | Canada | 2002, 2006, 2010 | 1999, 2000, 2001, 2004, 2007 |
| (Canada) Becky Kellar-Duke | Canada | 2002, 2006, 2010 | 1999, 2000, 2001, 2004 |
| (Canada) Colleen Sostorics | Canada | 2002, 2006, 2010 | 2001, 2004, 2007 |
| (Canada) Cherie Piper | Canada | 2002, 2006, 2010 | 2004 |
| (Canada) Danielle Goyette | Canada | 2002, 2006 | 1992, 1994, 1997, 1999, 2000, 2001, 2004, 2007 |
| (Canada) Vicky Sunohara | Canada | 2002, 2006 | 1990, 1997, 1999, 2000, 2001, 2004, 2007 |
| (Canada) Cassie Campbell-Pascall | Canada | 2002, 2006 | 1994, 1997, 1999, 2000, 2001, 2004 |
| (Canada) Cheryl Pounder | Canada | 2002, 2006 | 1994, 1999, 2000, 2001, 2004, 2007 |
| (Canada) Geraldine Heaney | Canada | 2002 | 1990, 1992, 1994, 1997, 1999, 2000, 2001 |
| (Canada) Thérèse Brisson | Canada | 2002 | 1994, 1997, 1999, 2000, 2001, 2004 |
| (Canada) Kelly Bechard | Canada | 2002 | 2000, 2001, 2004, 2007 |
| (Canada) Sami Jo Small | Canada | 2002 | 1999, 2000, 2001, 2004 |
| (Canada) Lori Dupuis | Canada | 2002 | 1997, 1999, 2000 |
| (Canada) Dana Antal | Canada | 2002 | 2001, 2004 |
| (Canada) Tammy Shewchuk-Dryden | Canada | 2002 | 2000, 2001 |
| (Canada) Isabelle Chartrand | Canada | 2002 | 2001 |
| (Canada) Gillian Apps | Canada | 2006, 2010, 2014 | 2004, 2007, 2012 |
| (Canada) Meghan Agosta | Canada | 2006, 2010, 2014 | 2007, 2012 |
| (Canada) Charline Labonté | Canada | 2006, 2010, 2014 | 2007, 2012 |
| (Canada) Gina Kingsbury | Canada | 2006, 2010 | 2001, 2004, 2007 |
| (Canada) Carla MacLeod | Canada | 2006, 2010 | 2007 |
| (Canada) Sarah Vaillancourt | Canada | 2006, 2010 | 2007 |
| (Canada) Gillian Ferrari | Canada | 2006 | 2004, 2007 |
| (Canada) Katie Weatherston | Canada | 2006 | 2007 |
| (Canada) Marie-Philip Poulin | Canada | 2010, 2014, 2022 | 2012, 2021, 2022, 2024 |
| (Canada) Rebecca Johnston | Canada | 2010, 2014, 2022 | 2012, 2021 |
| (Canada) Meaghan Mikkelson | Canada | 2010, 2014 | 2012, 2022 |
| (Canada) Haley Irwin | Canada | 2010, 2014 | 2012 |
| (Canada) Shannon Szabados | Canada | 2010, 2014 | 2012 |
| (Canada) Catherine Ward | Canada | 2010, 2014 | 2012 |
| (Canada) Tessa Bonhomme | Canada | 2010 | 2007, 2012 |
| (Canada) Brianne Jenner | Canada | 2014, 2022 | 2012, 2021, 2022, 2024 |
| (Canada) Jocelyne Larocque | Canada | 2014, 2022 | 2012, 2021, 2022, 2024 |
| (Canada) Natalie Spooner | Canada | 2014, 2022 | 2012, 2021, 2024 |
| (Canada) Mélodie Daoust | Canada | 2014, 2022 | 2021 |
| (Canada) Laura Fortino | Canada | 2014 | 2012 |
| (Canada) Geneviève Lacasse | Canada | 2014 | 2012 |
| (Canada) Lauriane Rougeau | Canada | 2014 | 2012 |
| (Canada) Jenn Wakefield | Canada | 2014 | 2012 |
| (United States) Hillary Knight | United States | 2018, 2026 | 2008, 2009, 2011, 2013, 2015, 2016, 2017, 2019, 2023, 2025 |
| (United States) Kendall Coyne Schofield | United States | 2018, 2026 | 2011, 2013, 2015, 2016, 2017, 2019, 2025 |
| (United States) Lee Stecklein | United States | 2018, 2026 | 2013, 2015, 2016, 2017; 2019, 2023, 2025 |
| (United States) Megan Keller | United States | 2018, 2026 | 2015, 2016, 2017, 2019, 2023, 2025 |
| (United States) Kelly Pannek | United States | 2018, 2026 | 2017, 2019, 2023, 2025 |
| (United States) Cayla Barnes | United States | 2018, 2026 | 2019, 2023, 2025 |
| (United States) Kacey Bellamy | United States | 2018 | 2008, 2009, 2011, 2013, 2015, 2016, 2017, 2019 |
| (United States) Meghan Duggan | United States | 2018 | 2008, 2009, 2011, 2013, 2015, 2016, 2017 |
| (United States) Brianna Decker | United States | 2018 | 2011, 2013, 2015, 2016, 2017, 2019 |
| (United States) Jocelyne Lamoureux | United States | 2018 | 2009, 2011, 2013, 2015, 2016, 2017 |
| (United States) Monique Lamoureux | United States | 2018 | 2009, 2011, 2013, 2015, 2016, 2017 |
| (United States) Gigi Marvin | United States | 2018 | 2008, 2009, 2011, 2013, 2017 |
| (United States) Alex Rigsby | United States | 2018 | 2013, 2015, 2016, 2017, 2019 |
| (United States) Amanda Kessel | United States | 2018 | 2013, 2017, 2019, 2023 |
| (United States) Emily Pfalzer | United States | 2018 | 2015, 2016, 2017, 2019 |
| (United States) Hannah Brandt | United States | 2018 | 2015, 2017, 2019 |
| (United States) Nicole Hensley | United States | 2018 | 2016, 2017, 2023 |
| (United States) Haley Skarupa | United States | 2018 | 2015, 2016, 2027 |
| (United States) Dani Cameranesi | United States | 2018 | 2015, 2019 |
| (United States) Amanda Pelkey | United States | 2018 | 2016, 2017 |
| (United States) Maddie Rooney | United States | 2018 | 2017, 2019 |
| (United States) Kali Flanagan | United States | 2018 | 2017 |
| (Canada) Erin Ambrose | Canada | 2022 | 2021, 2022, 2024 |
| (Canada) Ashton Bell | Canada | 2022 | 2021, 2022, 2024 |
| (Canada) Kristen Campbell | Canada | 2022 | 2021, 2022, 2024 |
| (Canada) Emily Clark | Canada | 2022 | 2021, 2022, 2024 |
| (Canada) Ann-Renée Desbiens | Canada | 2022 | 2021, 2022, 2024 |
| (Canada) Renata Fast | Canada | 2022 | 2021, 2022, 2024 |
| (Canada) Sarah Fillier | Canada | 2022 | 2021, 2022, 2024 |
| (Canada) Emma Maltais | Canada | 2022 | 2021, 2022, 2024 |
| (Canada) Emerance Maschmeyer | Canada | 2022 | 2021, 2022, 2024 |
| (Canada) Sarah Nurse | Canada | 2022 | 2021, 2022, 2024 |
| (Canada) Jamie Lee Rattray | Canada | 2022 | 2021, 2022, 2024 |
| (Canada) Ella Shelton | Canada | 2022 | 2021, 2022, 2024 |
| (Canada) Laura Stacey | Canada | 2022 | 2021, 2022, 2024 |
| (Canada) Blayre Turnbull | Canada | 2022 | 2021, 2022, 2024 |
| (Canada) Jill Saulnier | Canada | 2022 | 2021 |
| (Canada) Claire Thompson | Canada | 2022 | 2021 |
| (Canada) Micah Zandee-Hart | Canada | 2022 | 2022 |
| (United States) Alex Carpenter | United States | 2026 | 2013, 2015, 2016, 2017, 2019, 2023, 2025 |
| (United States) Hayley Scamurra | United States | 2026 | 2019, 2023, 2025 |
| (United States) Britta Curl-Salemme | United States | 2026 | 2023, 2025 |
| (United States) Aerin Frankel | United States | 2026 | 2023, 2025 |
| (United States) Caroline Harvey | United States | 2026 | 2023, 2025 |
| (United States) Taylor Heise | United States | 2026 | 2023, 2025 |
| (United States) Tessa Janecke | United States | 2026 | 2023, 2025 |
| (United States) Abbey Murphy | United States | 2026 | 2023, 2025 |
| (United States) Haley Winn | United States | 2026 | 2023, 2025 |
| (United States) Hannah Bilka | United States | 2026 | 2023 |
| (United States) Joy Dunne | United States | 2026 | 2025 |
| (United States) Laila Edwards | United States | 2026 | 2025 |
| (United States) Rory Guilday | United States | 2026 | 2023 |
| (United States) Gwyneth Philips | United States | 2026 | 2025 |
| (United States) Kirsten Simms | United States | 2026 | 2025 |
| (United States) Grace Zumwinkle | United States | 2026 | 2025 |
