= Cross-country skiing at the 1972 Winter Olympics =

Cross country skiing at the XI Olympic Winter Games
- Venue: Makomanai Cross Country Events Site
- Dates: February 4–13
- No. of events: 7
- Competitors: 152 (104 men, 48 women) from 19 nations

The 1972 Winter Olympic Games cross-country skiing results.

== Medal summary ==
=== Medal table ===
Rank	Nation	Gold	Silver	Bronze	Total
1	Soviet Union	5	2	1	8
2	Norway	1	3	3	7
3	Sweden	1	0	0	1
4	Finland	0	2	1	3
5	Czechoslovakia	0	0	1	1
5	Switzerland	0	0	1	1
Totals (6 entries)		7	7	7	21

=== Men's events ===
Event	Gold		Silver		Bronze	
15 km	Sven-Åke Lundbäck; Sweden	45:28.24	Fyodor Simachov; Soviet Union	46:00.84	Ivar Formo; Norway	46:02.68
30 km	Vyacheslav Vedenin; Soviet Union	1:36:31.15	Pål Tyldum; Norway	1:37:25.30	Johs Harviken; Norway	1:37:32.44
50 km	Pål Tyldum; Norway	2:43:14.75	Magne Myrmo; Norway	2:43:29.45	Vyacheslav Vedenin; Soviet Union	2:44:00.19
4 × 10 km relay	Soviet Union; Vladimir Voronkov; Yuriy Skobov; Fyodor Simachov; Vyacheslav Vedenin	2:04:47.94	Norway; Oddvar Brå; Pål Tyldum; Ivar Formo; Johs Harviken	2:04:57.06	Switzerland; Alfred Kälin; Albert Giger; Alois Kälin; Eduard Hauser	2:07:00.06

=== Women's events ===
Event	Gold		Silver		Bronze	
5 km	Galina Kulakova; Soviet Union	17:00.50	Marjatta Kajosmaa; Finland	17:05.50	Helena Šikolová; Czechoslovakia	17:07.32
10 km	Galina Kulakova; Soviet Union	34:17.82	Alevtina Olyunina; Soviet Union	34:54.11	Marjatta Kajosmaa; Finland	34:56.45
3 × 5 km relay	Soviet Union; Lyubov Mukhachyova; Alevtina Olyunina; Galina Kulakova	48:46.15	Finland; Helena Takalo; Hilkka Riihivuori; Marjatta Kajosmaa	49:19.37	Norway; Inger Aufles; Aslaug Dahl; Berit Mørdre	49:51.49

=== Participating NOCs ===
Nineteen nations participated in Cross-country skiing at the 1972 Games.

- Austria
- Bulgaria
- Canada
- Republic of China
- Czechoslovakia
- East Germany
- Finland
- France
- Great Britain
- Italy
- Japan
- Mongolia
- Norway
- Poland
- Soviet Union
- Sweden
- Switzerland
- United States
- West Germany
