= Armed Forces (sports society) =

System of sports clubs in Eastern European countries

The Sports Clubs of the Armed Forces, Physical Culture and Sports Association of the Soviet Armed Forces (Russian: спортивные клубы Армии [СКА] sportivnye kluby Armiy, SKA; Russian: Физкультурно-спортивное объединение Вооружённых Сил СССР, Fizkulturno-sportivnoe obyedinenie Vooruzhonnykh Sil SSSR), also called the Sports Clubs of the Soviet Ministry of Defense or simply Armed Forces or Army were a system of departmental sports clubs and one of the largest sports societies in the USSR.

Established at first within officers' clubs of the Red Army, after the Second World War they were reformed into sports clubs for all ranks in the armed forces. All the sports clubs were supervised by the Sports Committee of the Ministry of Defence of the USSR and the sports committees of military districts and naval fleets, with each district and fleet having its own club. The army clubs were often abbreviated as SKA and previously as SKVO and DO. The largest club was located in Moscow, CSKA Moscow ("C" standing for Central). The military sports clubs had an opportunity to enlist all top athletes of a country due to the mandatory conscription policies in force then.

Alongside the SKA teams in the Soviet Army, each service branch of the Armed Forces maintained service-wide clubs, with component teams coming under district or fleet club supervision.

Following the World War II, there was an acute competitiveness in all types of sports (i.e. football, ice hockey, basketball, etc.) between the Soviet Armed Forces Sports Association clubs and the clubs of the Dynamo representing Soviet security forces (MVD and KGB).

== Regional multi-sport clubs ==
- CSKA Moscow ("central" [main] club of the army)
  - football section as PFC CSKA in Soviet Top League
  - ice hockey section as HC CSKA in Soviet Higher League
- VVS Moscow (smaller Moscow club of the Air Forces)
  - football section
  - basketball section, won the 1951–52 Soviet Top League in basketball
- SKA Leningrad
  - ice hockey section
- Rostov-on-Don (football)
- Khabarovsk (bandy)
- Yekaterinburg (bandy)
- SKA Kyiv (Kiev Military District), converted to the Central Sports Club of the Armed Forces of Ukraine
  - football section, contributed to appearance of FC Arsenal Kyiv, disbanded in 2009
- SKA Odesa (Odessa Military District), converted to the Odesa city's sport club in 1992
  - football section, merged with FC Chornomorets Odesa
- SKA Lviv (Carpathian Military District), disbanded
  - football section, moved to Drohobych and transformed into FC Halychyna Drohobych
- SKA Alma-Ata, disbanded
  - basketball section, moved to Samara and merged with a local club into CSK VVS Samara

== Medal recipients of the Armed Forces sports society at Olympics ==
City represented and sports discipline are given in parentheses.

=== Summer Olympics ===
==== 1952 Summer Olympics ====
1. Yuriy Lituyev (Leningrad, athletics)
2. Boris Tokarev (Leningrad, athletics)
3. Anatoly Konev (Moscow, basketball)
4. Aleksandr Moiseyev (Moscow, basketball)
5. Arkady Vorobyov (Sverdlovsk, weightlifting)
- Dmytro Leonkin, Lviv (gymnastics)
- Dmytro Leonkin, Lviv (gymnastics)

==== 1956 Summer Olympics ====
1. Yuriy Lituyev (Moscow, athletics)
2. Yevgeniy Maskinskov (Saransk, athletics)
3. Semyon Rzhishchin (Moscow, athletics)
4. Boris Tokarev (Moscow, athletics)
5. Viktor Tsybulenko (Kyiv, athletics)
6. Vladimir Safronov (Chita, boxing)
7. Arkady Vorobyov (Sverdlovsk, weightlifting)
- Ivan Deriuhin, Kyiv
- Vitali Romanenko, Poltava Oblast

==== 1960 Summer Olympics ====
1. Gusman Kosanov (Kishinev, athletics)
2. Semyon Rzhishchin (Moscow, athletics)
3. Viktor Tsybulenko (Kyiv, athletics)
4. Yury Vlasov (Moscow, weightlifting)
5. Arkady Vorobyov (Sverdlovsk, weightlifting)
- Margarita Nikolaeva, Odesa
- Ivan Bohdan, Kyiv

==== 1964 Summer Olympics ====
1. Oleg Fyodoseyev (Moscow, athletics)
2. Gusman Kosanov (Alma-Ata, athletics)
3. Edvin Ozolin (Leningrad, athletics)
4. Oleg Grigoryev (Moscow, boxing)
5. Stanislav Stepashkin (Moscow, boxing)
6. Volodymyr Morozov (Krasnovodsk, canoeing)
7. Grigory Kriss (Kyiv, fencing)
8. Oleg Stepanov (Moscow, judo)
9. Yury Vlasov (Moscow, weightlifting)
10. Leonid Zhabotinsky (Odesa, weightlifting)

==== 1968 Summer Olympics ====
1. Hennadiy Bleznitsov (Kharkiv, athletics)
2. Galina Bukharina (Moscow, athletics)
3. Romuald Klim (Minsk, athletics)
4. Jānis Lūsis (Riga, athletics)
5. Volodymyr Morozov (Kyiv, canoeing)
6. Valery Yardy (Moscow, cycling)
7. Grigory Kriss (Kyiv, fencing)
8. Viktor Sidyak (Lviv, fencing)
9. Eduard Vinokurov (Leningrad, fencing)
10. Leonid Zhabotinsky (Kyiv, weightlifting)

==== 1972 Summer Olympics ====
1. Nadezhda Besfamilnaya (Moscow, athletics)
2. Galina Bukharina (Moscow, athletics)
3. Jānis Lūsis (Riga, athletics)
4. Veniamin Soldatenko (Alma-Ata, athletics)
5. Sergei Belov (Moscow, basketball)
6. Ivan Edeshko (Moscow, basketball)
7. Alzhan Zharmukhamedov (Moscow, basketball)
8. Vyacheslav Lemeshev (Moscow, boxing)
9. Volodymyr Morozov (Kyiv, canoeing)
10. Valery Yardy (Cheboksary, cycling)
11. Grigory Kriss (Kyiv, fencing)
12. Viktor Sidyak (Minsk, fencing)
13. Gennadiy Tsygankov (Moscow, ice hockey)
14. Eduard Vinokurov (Leningrad, fencing)

==== 1976 Summer Olympics ====
1. Lidiya Alfeyeva (Moscow, athletics)
2. Vera Anisimova (Moscow, athletics)
3. Jānis Lūsis (Riga, athletics)
4. Sergei Belov (Moscow, basketball)
5. Ivan Edeshko (Moscow, basketball)
6. Alzhan Zharmukhamedov (Moscow, basketball)
7. Viktor Sidyak (Minsk, fencing)
8. Yevgeni Chernyshov (Moscow, handball)
9. Gennadiy Tsygankov (Moscow, ice hockey)
10. Vladimir Bure (Moscow, swimming)
11. Oleg Moliboga (Dnipropetrovsk, volleyball)
12. Eduard Vinokurov (Leningrad, fencing)

==== 1980 Summer Olympics ====
1. Yevgeni Chernyshov (Moscow, handball)
2. Anatoli Fedyukin (Moscow, handball)
- Oleg Moliboga, Dnipropetrovsk

==== 1988 Summer Olympics ====
1. Dmitry Bilozerchev (Moscow, artistic gymnastics)
2. Hennadiy Avdyeyenko (Odesa, athletics)

=== Olympians of the Unified Team ===
==== 1992 Summer Olympics ====
- Timur Taimazov (weightlifting)

=== Winter Olympics ===
==== 1956 Winter Olympics ====
1. Fyodor Terentyev (Moscow, cross-country skiing)
2. Nikolay Gusakov (Moscow, Nordic combined)

==== 1960 Winter Olympics ====
1. Vladimir Melanin (Kirov, biathlon)
2. Gennady Vaganov (Moscow, cross-country skiing)
3. Nikolay Gusakov (Leningrad, Nordic combined)

==== 1964 Winter Olympics ====
1. Vladimir Melanin (Kirov, biathlon)
2. Rita Achkina (Moscow, cross-country skiing)
3. Yevdokiya Mekshilo (Leningrad, cross-country skiing)
4. Gennady Vaganov (Moscow, cross-country skiing)
5. Nikolay Gusakov (Leningrad, Nordic combined)
6. Nikolay Kiselyov (Leningrad, Nordic combined)

==== 1968 Winter Olympics ====
1. Rita Achkina (Moscow, cross-country skiing)
2. Vladimir Voronkov (Moscow, cross-country skiing)
3. Vladimir Belussov (Leningrad Oblast, ski jumping)

==== 1972 Winter Olympics ====
1. Vladimir Voronkov (Moscow, cross-country skiing)
2. Irina Rodnina (Moscow, figure skating)
3. Alexei Ulanov (Moscow, figure skating)

==== 1976 Winter Olympics ====
1. Zinaida Amosova (Novosibirsk, cross-country skiing)
2. Nikolay Bazhukov (Syktyvkar, cross-country skiing)
3. Sergey Savelyev (Moscow, cross-country skiing)
4. Irina Rodnina (Moscow, figure skating)
5. Valery Muratov (Kolomna, speed skating)

==== 1988 Winter Olympics ====
- Vyacheslav Bykov (Moscow, ice hockey)

== Overall Olympic performance by the society ==
In the following table for team events number of team representatives, who received medals are counted, not "one medal for one team", as usual.

=== Summer Olympics ===
Olympics	Athletes	Gold	Silver	Bronze	Total medals
1952	93	7	7	3	17
1956	80	12	11	15	38
1960	66	14	15	6	35
1964	112	27	29	12	68
1968	99	17	27	17	71
1972	104	33	18	18	69
1976	97	22	22	15	59

=== Winter Olympics ===
Olympics	Athletes	Gold	Silver	Bronze	Total medals
1956	20	13	1	1	15
1960	18	2	0	9	11
1964	24	11	3	1	15
1968	23	13	2	1	16
1972	24	16	0	1	17
1976	20	16	1	2	19

== See also ==
- Soviet Union at the Olympics
- CSKA Moscow
- SKA Leningrad

== Bibliography ==
- Boris Khavin (1979). All about Olympic Games (in Russian) (2nd ed.). Moscow: Fizkultura i sport. - for tables and lists on 1952-1976 Olympics
