= Finland at the 1972 Winter Olympics =

- IOC code: FIN
- NOC: Finnish Olympic Committee
- Website: sport.fi/olympiakomitea (in Finnish and Swedish)

in Sapporo
- Competitors: 50 (43 men, 7 women) in 6 sports
- Flag bearers: Juha Mieto, cross-country skiing
- Medals Ranked 15th: Gold 0 Silver 4 Bronze 1 Total 5

Winter Olympics appearances (overview)
- 1924; 1928; 1932; 1936; 1948; 1952; 1956; 1960; 1964; 1968; 1972; 1976; 1980; 1984; 1988; 1992; 1994; 1998; 2002; 2006; 2010; 2014; 2018; 2022; 2026

Finland competed at the 1972 Winter Olympics in Sapporo, Japan.

== Medalists ==
Medal	Name	Sport	Event
Silver	Heikki Ikola; Mauri Röppänen; Esko Saira; Juhani Suutarinen	Biathlon	Men's 4 x 7.5 km relay
Silver	Marjatta Kajosmaa	Cross-country skiing	Women's 5 km
Silver	Marjatta Kajosmaa; Hilkka Riihivuori; Helena Takalo	Cross-country skiing	Women's 3 × 5 km relay
Silver	Rauno Miettinen	Nordic combined	Men's individual
Bronze	Marjatta Kajosmaa	Cross-country skiing	Women's 10 km

== Biathlon ==
Men

Event	Athlete	Time	Penalties	Adjusted time ^{1}	Rank
20 km	Juhani Suutarinen	1'14:25.99	10	1'24:25.99	30
20 km	Mauri Röppänen	1'16:45.88	7	1'23:45.88	27
20 km	Esko Saira	1'12:34.80	5	1'17:34.80	6
20 km	Yrjö Salpakari	1'14:51.43	2	1'16:51.43	5

^{1} One minute added per close miss (a hit in the outer ring), two minutes added per complete miss.

Men's 4 x 7.5 km relay

Athletes	Race		
Athletes	Misses ^{2}	Time	Rank
Esko Saira; Juhani Suutarinen; Heikki Ikola; Mauri Röppänen	3	1'54:37.25	2nd place, silver medalist(s)

^{2} A penalty loop of 200 metres had to be skied per missed target.

== Cross-country skiing ==
Men

Event	Athlete	Race	
Event	Athlete	Time	Rank
15 km	Manne Liimatainen	48:59.90	35
15 km	Juhani Repo	47:56.16	23
15 km	Osmo Karjalainen	46:27.51	10
15 km	Juha Mieto	46:02.74	4
30 km	Osmo Karjalainen	DNF	–
30 km	Raimo Lehtinen	DNF	–
30 km	Teuvo Hatunen	1'42:27.18	22
30 km	Eero Mäntyranta	1'41:40.51	19
50 km	Kalevi Oikarainen	DNF	–
50 km	Eero Mäntyranta	DNF	–
50 km	Teuvo Hatunen	3'00:41.72	32
50 km	Hannu Taipale	2'48:24.83	12

Men's 4 × 10 km relay

Athletes	Race	
Athletes	Time	Rank
Hannu Taipale; Juha Mieto; Juhani Repo; Osmo Karjalainen	2'07:50.19	5

Women

Event	Athlete	Race	
Event	Athlete	Time	Rank
5 km	Senja Pusula	17:59.93	25
5 km	Helena Takalo	17:21.39	9
5 km	Hilkka Kuntola	17:11.67	5
5 km	Marjatta Kajosmaa	17:05.50	2nd place, silver medalist(s)
10 km	Marjatta Muttilainen	36:46.40	22
10 km	Hilkka Kuntola	35:36.71	8
10 km	Helena Takalo	35:06.34	5
10 km	Marjatta Kajosmaa	34:56.45	3rd place, bronze medalist(s)

Women's 3 × 5 km relay

Athletes	Race	
Athletes	Time	Rank
Helena Takalo; Hilkka Kuntola; Marjatta Kajosmaa	49:19.37	2nd place, silver medalist(s)

== Ice hockey ==
=== First round ===
Winners (in bold) entered the Medal Round. Other teams played a consolation round for 7th-11th places.

Team 1	Score	Team 2
**Finland**	13–1	Norway

=== Medal round ===
Rank	Team	Pld	W	L	T	GF	GA	Pts
1	Soviet Union	5	4	0	1	33	13	9
2	United States	5	3	2	0	18	15	6
3	Czechoslovakia	5	3	2	0	26	13	6
4	Sweden	5	2	2	1	17	13	5
5	Finland	5	2	3	0	14	24	4
6	Poland	5	0	5	0	9	39	0

- USSR 9-3 Finland
- Finland 5-1 Poland
- Czechoslovakia 7-1 Finland
- USA 4-1 Finland
- Finland 4-3 Sweden
- Team roster:
  - Jorma Valtonen
  - Ilpo Koskela
  - Seppo Lindström
  - Heikki Riihiranta
  - Heikki Järn
  - Juha Rantasila
  - Pekka Marjamäki
  - Jorma Vehmanen
  - Jorma Peltonen
  - Veli-Pekka Ketola
  - Matti Murto
  - Matti Keinonen
  - Harri Linnonmaa
  - Juhani Tamminen
  - Lasse Oksanen
  - Esa Peltonen
  - Seppo Repo
  - Lauri Mononen
  - Timo Turunen
- Head coach: Seppo Liitsola

== Nordic combined ==
Events:

- normal hill ski jumping (Three jumps, best two counted and shown here.)
- 15 km cross-country skiing

Athlete	Event	Ski Jumping				Cross-country			Total	
Athlete	Event	Distance 1	Distance 2	Points	Rank	Time	Points	Rank	Points	Rank
Jukka Kuvaja	Individual	66.0	71.0	160.2	25	51:17.0	194.185	19	354.385	27
Erkki Kilpinen	Individual	73.5	75.5	185.0	9	49:52.6	206.845	4	391.845	4
Rauno Miettinen	Individual	77.5	79.0	210.0	2	51:08.2	195.505	15	405.505	2nd place, silver medalist(s)

== Ski jumping ==
Athlete	Event	Jump 1		Jump 2		Total	
Athlete	Event	Distance	Points	Distance	Points	Points	Rank
Esko Rautionaho	Normal hill	73.5	100.3	67.0	87.4	187.7	45
Kari Ylianttila	Normal hill	76.0	104.8	73.5	101.8	206.6	25
Rauno Miettinen	Normal hill	75.5	105.5	75.5	106.5	212.0	17
Tauno Käyhkö	Normal hill	76.0	105.8	75.5	106.0	211.8	18
Rauno Miettinen	Large hill	83.0	79.7	87.5	91.0	170.7	32
Esko Rautionaho	Large hill	93.0	95.7	99.0	110.1	205.8	9
Kari Ylianttila	Large hill	91.5	99.1	92.0	98.3	197.4	13
Tauno Käyhkö	Large hill	95.0	104.5	100.5	114.7	219.2	4

== Speed skating ==
Men

Event	Athlete	Race	
Event	Athlete	Time	Rank
500 m	Jouko Salakka	42.81	27
500 m	Leo Linkovesi	40.14	6
500 m	Seppo Hänninen	40.12	5
1500 m	Leo Linkovesi	2:16.86	34
1500 m	Seppo Hänninen	2:14.52	28
1500 m	Jouko Salakka	2:10.22	17
1500 m	Kimmo Koskinen	2:08.18	10
5000 m	Jouko Salakka	7:57.42	18
5000 m	Kimmo Koskinen	7:45.15	11
10,000 m	Jouko Salakka	16:35.64	19
10,000 m	Kimmo Koskinen	15:38.87	7

Women

Event	Athlete	Race	
Event	Athlete	Time	Rank
500 m	Tuula Vilkas	46.85	24
500 m	Arja Kantola	46.12	16
1000 m	Arja Kantola	1:35.45	21
1000 m	Tuula Vilkas	1:33.51	11
1500 m	Tuula Vilkas	2:27.09	16
3000 m	Arja Kantola	5:30.88	21
3000 m	Tuula Vilkas	5:05.92	7
