= Butov =

Butov may refer to

- 13049 Butov, an asteroid
- Butov (surname)
- Butov (Czech Republic), municipality in the west of the Czech Republic.
