= Teuvo Hatunen =

Finnish cross-country skier

Personal information
- Nationality: Finnish
- Born: 20 August 1944 Haapavesi, Finland
- Died: 15 December 2010 (aged 66) Ylitornio, Finland

Sport
- Sport: Cross-country skiing

Teuvo Hatunen (20 August 1944 – 15 December 2010) was a Finnish cross-country skier. He competed in the men's 30 kilometre event at the 1972 Winter Olympics.

== Cross-country skiing results ==
=== Olympic Games ===
Year	Age	15 km	30 km	50 km	4 × 10 km relay
1972	27	—	22	32	—
