= Yevgeni Chernyshov =

Soviet handball player

Olympic medal record

Representing Soviet Union

Men's Handball

Olympic Games
Gold medal – first place	1976 Montreal	Team
Silver medal – second place	1980 Moscow	Team

World Championship
Silver medal – second place	1978 Denmark	Team

Yevgeni Vasilyevich Chernyshov (Russian: Евгений Васильевич Чернышёв; born February 22, 1947, in the village of Proletarsky, Serpukhovsky District, Moscow Oblast) is a Soviet/Russian former handball player who competed in the 1976 Summer Olympics and in the 1980 Summer Olympics.

He trained at the Armed Forces sports society in Moscow. In 1976 he won the gold medal with the Soviet team. He played all six matches and scored 16 goals.

Four years later he was part of the Soviet team which won the silver medal. He played all six matches.
