= Donna McCannell =

Canadian speed skater

Personal information
- Born: 20 May 1950 (age 75) Winnipeg, Manitoba, Canada

Sport
- Sport: Speed skating

Donna McCannell (born 20 May 1950) is a Canadian speed skater. She competed in the women's 500 metres at the 1972 Winter Olympics.
