= Kay Lunda =

American speed skater

Personal information
- Born: April 28, 1957 (age 67); Madison, Wisconsin, United States

Sport
- Sport: Speed skating

Kay Lunda (born April 28, 1957) is an American speed skater. She competed in the women's 500 metres at the 1972 Winter Olympics.
