= Osmo Karjalainen =

Finnish cross-country skier

Personal information
- Nationality: Finnish
- Born: 2 February 1940 Ii, Finland
- Died: 5 April 2013 (aged 73) Kuusamo, Finland

Sport
- Sport: Cross-country skiing

Osmo Karjalainen (2 February 1940 – 5 April 2013) was a Finnish cross-country skier. He competed in the men's 15 kilometre event at the 1972 Winter Olympics.

== Cross-country skiing results ==
=== Olympic Games ===
Year	Age	15 km	30 km	50 km	4 × 10 km relay
1972	32	10	DNF	—	5

=== World Championships ===
Year	Age	15 km	30 km	50 km	4 × 10 km relay
1974	34	—	—	—	4
