= Butov (surname) =

Butov (Russian: Бутов) is a Russian masculine surname, its feminine counterpart is Butova. It may refer to

- Alla Butova (1950–2016), Russian Olympic speed skater
- Mikhail Butov, Russian author, winner of the 1999 Russian Booker Prize
