= Lyudmila Savrulina =

Soviet speed skater

Personal information
- Nationality: Russian
- Born: 25 July 1951 (age 73); Susuman, Soviet Union

Sport
- Sport: Speed skating

Lyudmila Savrulina (born 25 July 1951) is a Russian former speed skater. She competed in three events at the 1972 Winter Olympics, representing the Soviet Union.
