= Yury Yegorov =

Russian luger (born 1947)

Personal information
- Nationality: Russian
- Born: 11 March 1947 (age 78); Leningrad, Russian SFSR, Soviet Union

Sport
- Sport: Luge

Yury Yegorov (born 11 March 1947) is a Russian luger. He competed in the men's singles and doubles events at the 1972 Winter Olympics.
