= Yury Svetikov =

Russian luger (born 1947)

Personal information
- Nationality: Russian
- Born: 20 September 1947 (age 77); Moscow, Russian SFSR, Soviet Union

Sport
- Sport: Luge

Yury Svetikov (born 20 September 1947) is a Russian luger. He competed in the men's singles and doubles events at the 1972 Winter Olympics.
