= Jukka Kuvaja =

Finnish Nordic combined skier

Personal information
- Nationality: Finnish
- Born: 4 November 1953 (age 71); Asikkala, Finland

Sport
- Sport: Nordic combined

Jukka Kuvaja (born 4 November 1953) is a Finnish skier. He competed in the Nordic combined events at the 1972 Winter Olympics, the 1976 Winter Olympics and the 1980 Winter Olympics.
