= Seppo Hänninen =

Finnish speed skater

Personal information
- Nationality: Finnish
- Born: 11 July 1943 (age 81); Parikkala, Finland

Sport
- Sport: Speed skating

Seppo Hänninen (born 11 July 1943) is a Finnish speed skater. He competed at the 1964 Winter Olympics, the 1968 Winter Olympics and the 1972 Winter Olympics.
