= Kapitolina Seryogina =

Russian speed skater

Personal information
- Nationality: Russian
- Born: 17 January 1942 (age 84) Pavlovsk, Soviet Union

Sport
- Sport: Speed skating
Medal record
Representing Soviet Union
Women's speed skating
European Championships
Bronze medal – third place	1971 Leningrad	Allround

Kapitolina Seryogina (born 17 January 1942) is a Russian speed skater. She competed in two events at the 1972 Winter Olympics, representing the Soviet Union.
