= Sergey Osipov (luger) =

Russian luger (born 1950)

Personal information
- Nationality: Russian
- Born: 1 October 1950 (age 74); Leningrad, Russian SFSR, Soviet Union

Sport
- Sport: Luge

Sergey Osipov (born 1 October 1950) is a Russian luger. He competed in the men's singles and doubles events at the 1972 Winter Olympics.
