= Vera Krasnova =

Russian speed skater

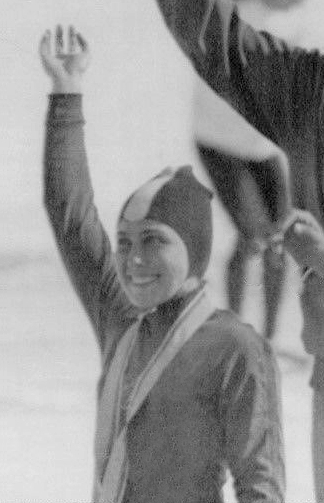
- Krasnova at the 1972 Olympics

Personal information
- Born: 3 April 1950 (age 76) Omsk, Russian SFSR, Soviet Union
- Height: 158 cm (5 ft 2 in)
- Weight: 58 kg (128 lb)

Sport
- Sport: Speed skating
- Club: Spartak Omsk; Spartak Moscow

Achievements and titles
- Personal best(s): 500 m – 40.96 (1976); 1000 m – 1:24.0 (1977); 1500 m – 2:19.48 (1977); 3000 m – 5:13.1 (1970)
Medal record
Representing the Soviet Union
Olympic Games
Silver medal – second place	1972 Sapporo	500 m

Vera Ivanovna Krasnova (Russian: Вера Ивановна Краснова, born 3 April 1950) is a retired Russian speed skater who specialized in the 500 m distance. She competed at the 1972 and 1976 Winter Olympics and won a silver medal in 1972, placing fifth in 1976.

Krasnova won a silver medal in the 500 m at the 1972 European All-around Championships. She took part in five World Sprint Speed Skating Championships, with the best result of fourth place in 1975. Domestically she won the 500 m Soviet title in 1969, 1972 and 1976. Krasnova was born in Omsk, but later moved to Moscow and worked there as a school teacher.
