= Lyubov Mukhachyova =

Soviet cross-country skier

Personal information
- Born: July 23, 1947 (age 78) Staraya Russa
- Height: 158 cm (5 ft 2 in)

Sport
- Sport: Skiing
Medal record
Women's cross-country skiing
Representing Soviet Union
Olympic Games
Gold medal – first place	1972 Sapporo	3 × 5 km relay

Lyubov Alexeyevna Mukhachyova (Russian: Любо́вь Алексе́евна Мухачёва; born July 23, 1947, in Staraya Russa) is a Soviet former cross-country skier who competed during the early 1970s for Trud Voluntary Sports Society. She won a gold medal at the 1972 Winter Olympics in Sapporo in the 3 × 5 km relay and also finished fourth in the 10 km and sixth in the 5 km at those same games.

== Cross-country skiing results ==
All results are sourced from the International Ski Federation (FIS).

=== Olympic Games ===
- 1 medal – (1 gold)

Year	Age	5 km	10 km	3 × 5 km relay
1972	24	6	4	Gold
