= Yevgeni Mishakov =

Russian ice hockey player (1941–2007)

Medal record

Men's ice hockey

Representing Soviet Union

Olympic Games
Gold medal – first place	1968 Grenoble	Team
Gold medal – first place	1972 Sapporo	Team

Mishakov in 1968

Yevgeni Dmitrievich Mishakov (Russian: Евгений Дмитриевич Мишаков; February 2, 1941 – May 30, 2007) was an ice hockey player who played in the Soviet Hockey League. He played for HK Lokomotiv Moscow, SKA MVO Tver and HC CSKA Moscow, as well as briefly for football club Sputnik Kaluga. He was inducted into the Russian and Soviet Hockey Hall of Fame in 1968. He died in Moscow, Russia. In his final years of life, he had to deal with significant health problems.
