= Yevgeni Zimin =

Soviet ice hockey player (1947–2018)

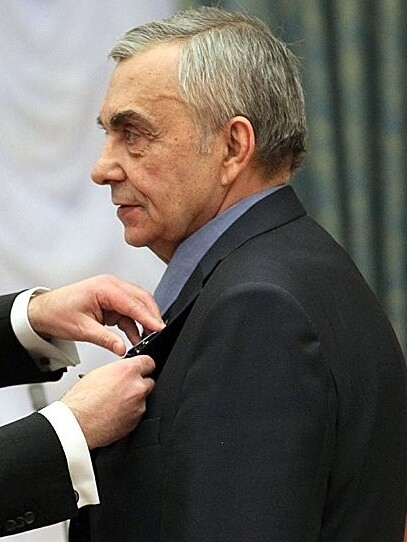
- Zimin in 2011
- Born: 6 August 1947 Moscow, Soviet Union
- Died: 28 December 2018 (aged 71) Moscow, Russia
- Height: 5 ft 8 in (173 cm)
- Weight: 181 lb (82 kg; 12 st 13 lb)
- Position: Right wing
- Shot: Left
- Played for: HC Spartak Moscow
- National team: Soviet Union
- Playing career: 1964–1977

Yevgeni Zimin
Medal record

Men's ice hockey

Representing Soviet Union

Olympic Games
Gold medal – first place	1968 Grenoble	Team
Gold medal – first place	1972 Sapporo	Team

Yevgeni Vladimirovich Zimin (Russian: Евгений Владимирович Зимин; 6 August 1947 – 28 December 2018) was a Soviet ice hockey player who played in the Soviet Hockey League. He played for HC Spartak Moscow. He was inducted into the Russian and Soviet Hockey Hall of Fame in 1968.

He died at the age of 71 in 2018. At the time of his death, he was a scout with the Philadelphia Flyers of the National Hockey League (NHL).
