= Tuula Vilkas =

Finnish speed skater

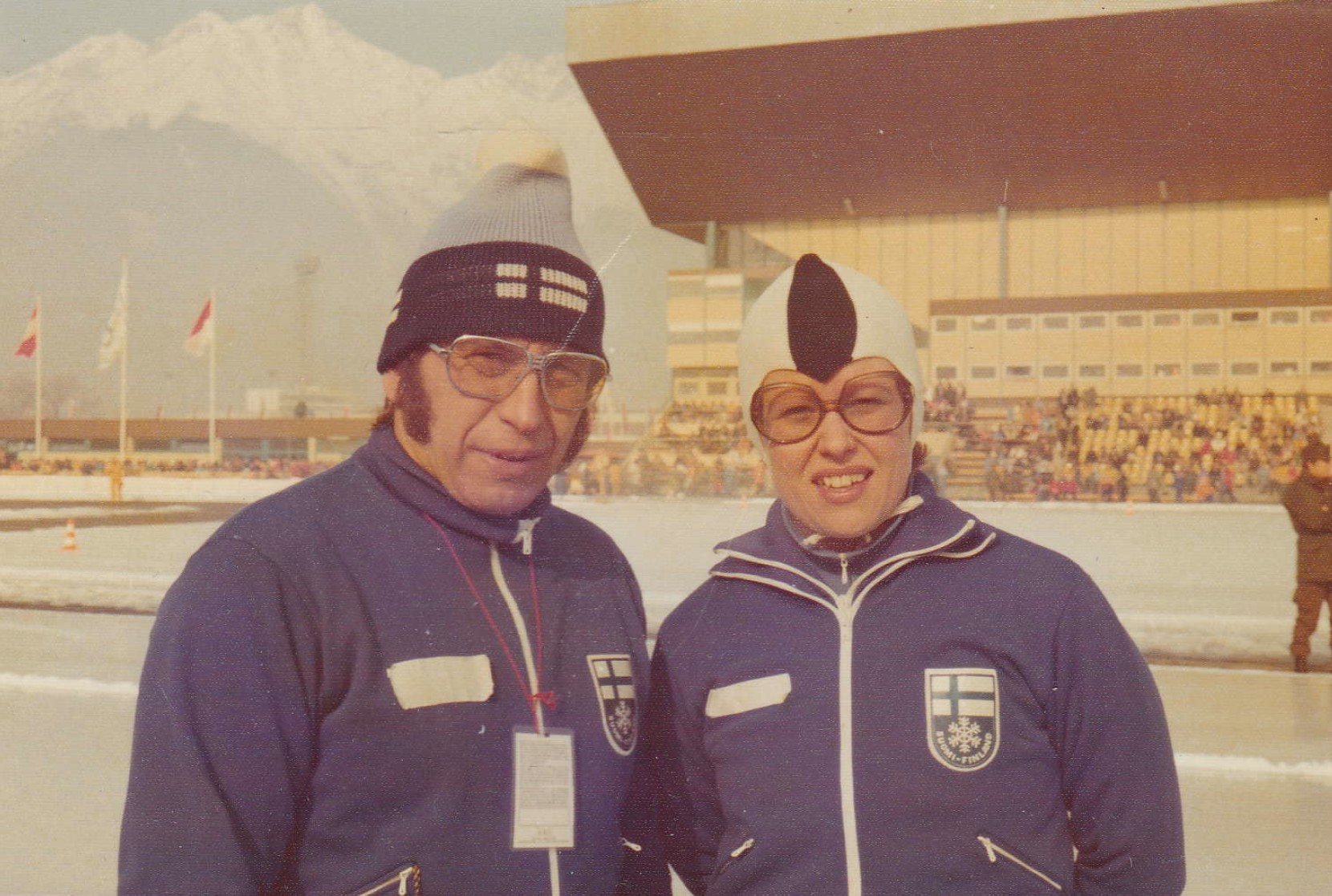
- Pentti Peltoperä and Tuula Vilkas at Innsbruck 1976 Winter Olympics.

Personal information
- Nationality: Finnish
- Born: 18 May 1950 (age 76) Urjala, Finland

Sport
- Sport: Speed skating

Video of her 500m race at the 1971 World Allround Speed Skating Championships for Women

Tuula Vilkas (born 18 May 1950) is a Finnish speed skater. She competed at the 1972 and 1976 Winter Olympics.
