= Fizkultura i sport =

Russian publisher

Fizkultura i sport (Russian: Физкультура и спорт, lit. trans.: Physical Culture and Sports) is a Russian publisher of sports books and magazines. It was established in 1923 in the USSR. Its logo depicts the famous sculpture Discobolus by Myron.

== Description ==
"Fizkultura i sport" was the main (though, not exclusive) sports publisher of the USSR. The publisher was a structural part of the State Committee for Publishing Houses, Printing Plants, and the Book Trade by the Council of Ministers of the USSR. It was awarded the Order of the Badge of Honor in 1973. In 1975, 113 books were published with the total circulation of 6.2 million. By 1991, the number of books, published per year, reached 150. After the breakup of the USSR, the amount of publications by the publisher greatly declined. But although today it publishes some 20 books a year, 5 to 10 thousand copies each, there were some signs of the revival in the latest years. Since 1995 the publisher is not under control of the government, it's the joint-stock company.

== Books ==
"Fizkultura i sport" published books and booklets, popularizing sports, textbooks, methodical yearbooks on many sports disciplines, popular and methodic literature (manuals for physical training on one's own, manuals on the preparation to pass GTO tests), books on tourism, fishing, hunting, chess. Since 1972, "Fizkultura i sport" published the yearbook "Panorama of the Sports Year" (Russian: Панорама спортивного года), that apart from articles on famous athletes and sports life of the country, contained results from all major international competitions (such as Olympic Games, World Championships, European Championships) and national competitions (Spartakiads, USSR Championships, etc.), held that year, for all sports, cultivated in the USSR. A lot of books were published on the 1980 Summer Olympics, Friendship Games, Goodwill Games and other major international events.

Literary publications were also one of the main scopes of the publisher. "Relay" (Russian: Эстафета) sports story collection was published yearly in 1980—1989. There were sports-related anthologies published:

- science fiction anthology "Wizards on the Stadium" (Russian: Маги на стадионе, 1979). I maghi dello stadio by Gianni Rodari, Sunjammer and The Cruel Sky by Arthur Clarke, The Gods Themselves by Isaac Asimov, Przekładaniec by Stanislaw Lem, Steel by Richard Matheson, etc.
- poetry anthology "Olympic Flame. Sports in Works by Poets of the World" (Russian: Олимпийский огонь. Спорт в творчестве поэтов мира, 1980). Poems by Ancient Greek poets, by contemporary poets from different countries, etc.
- anthology "Whispers in Bedlam" (Russian: Шепот в Бедламе, 1982). The Anthem Sprinters by Ray Bradbury, Home is the Hunter by Henry Kuttner, etc.
- humorous stories anthology "About Sports with a Smile" (Russian: С улыбкой о спорте, 1983). Taming the Bicycle by Mark Twain, etc.
- science fiction anthology "Horsehead" Rally (Russian: Ралли «Конская голова», 1990). The Menace from Earth by Robert A. Heinlein, etc.

== Book series ==
There were several series of biographical books on famous Soviet athletes and sportspeople, including "Heroes of the Olympic Games" (Russian: Герои Олимпийских игр), "World Sport Stars" (Russian: Звёзды мирового спорта), "Hearts, Given Up to Sports" (Russian: Сердца, отданные спорту). For example, in the latter series, books about Shavarsh Karapetyan, Irina Rodnina and Aleksandr Zaytsev, Alevtina Kolchina and Pavel Kolchin, Vladislav Tretiak, Vsevolod Bobrov, Modestas Paulauskas, Mikhail Yakushin and other notable Soviet athletes were published. Many Soviet book series had logos, the one of "Hearts, Given Up to Sports" series was the Olympic Torch. Besides, its special feature was the motto of the series in Russian, that was present inside each book: "Когда серебряные трубы возвещают победу, они зовут на пьедестал не только победителя, они славят СПОРТ: разум и силу, мужество и волю, верность, отвагу и честь; они славят ЛЮДЕЙ, отдавших сердца спорту, зовущих своими делами, своим примером на жизненный подвиг!" A rough translation into English would be:

When silver trumpets announce the victory, they invite on the pedestal not just a winner, they sing the praises of SPORTS: of mind and of strength, of courage and of will, of faithfulness, of bravery and of honour; they sing the praises of PEOPLE, who gave up their hearts to sports, who call upon the life exploit by their example!

== Magazines ==
Apart from books "Fizkultura i sport" published several magazines:

Title	Published since	ISSN	Languages	Circulation USSR	Type
Физкультура и спорт Physical Culture and Sport	1922	0130-5670	ru	425,000 (1977)	monthly
Олимпийская панорама Olympic Panorama	1976	0204-2177	de en es fr ru		quarterly
Теория и практика физической культуры The Theory and Practice of Physical Culture	1925	0040-3601	ru	20,000 (1975)	monthly
Спортивные игры Sporting Games	1955	0131-9604	ru	150,000 (1988)	monthly
Лёгкая атлетика Athletics	1955	0024-4155	ru	100,000 (1973)	monthly
Шахматы в СССР; Chess in the USSR	1921	0132-0947	ru	55,000 (1986)	monthly
Шахматный бюллетень Chess Bulletin	1955	0037-3230	ru	28,300 (1989)	monthly

== References and footnotes ==
- Great Soviet Encyclopedia
- "Физкультура и спорт". Russian Encyclopedic Dictionary (in Russian). Moscow: Great Russian Encyclopedia. 2001.
- Панорама спортивного года, 1984 [Panorama of the 1984 Sports Year] (in Russian). Moscow: Fizkultura i sport. 1985.
