= Fyodor Simashev =

Russian cross-country skier

Personal information
- Full name: Fyodor Petrovich Simashev
- Born: 13 March 1945 Verkhny Bagryazh, Tatarstan, Russian SFSR, USSR
- Died: 19 December 1997 (aged 52) Zainsk, Tatarstan, Russia
- Height: 166 cm (5 ft 5 in)
- Weight: 63 kg (139 lb)

Sport
- Sport: Cross-country skiing
- Club: Dynamo Moscow
Medal record
Representing the Soviet Union
Olympic Games
Gold medal – first place	1972 Sapporo	4×10 km
Silver medal – second place	1972 Sapporo	15 km
World Championships
Gold medal – first place	1970 Vysoké Tatry	4×10 km
Bronze medal – third place	1970 Vysoké Tatry	15 km
Silver medal – second place	1974 Falun	4×10 km

Fyodor Petrovich Simashev (Russian: Фёдор Петрович Симашёв, 13 March 1945 – 19 December 1997) was a Russian cross-country skier who competed at the 1968 and 1972 Winter Olympics. In 1968 he only entered the 15 km race and placed 26th. In 1972 he won a gold medal in the 4×10 km and a silver in the 15 km, placing sixth-eighth in the 30 km and 50 km events. He won another relay gold medal and two individual medals at the 1970 World Championships. Domestically he won twelve Soviet titles: in the 15 km (1968), 30 km (1969, 1971, 1973), 50 km (1974) and 4×10 km relay (1968–70, 1972, 1973, 1975, 1976). In 1972 he was awarded Order of the Badge of Honor.

After retiring from competitions Simashov worked as a sports official in Zainsk until his death in 1997. Since 1971, an annual junior cross-country skiing competition in his honor has been held in Zainsk.
