= Igor Romishevsky =

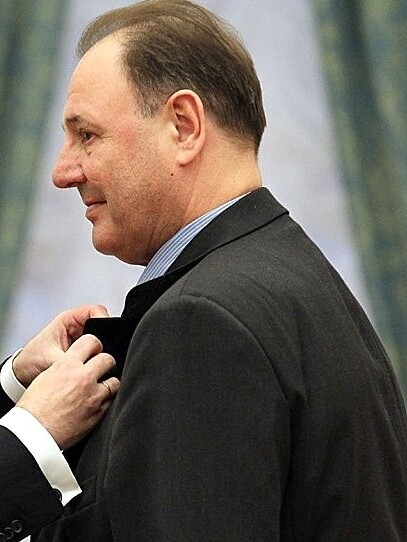
- 2011
- Born: 25 March 1940 (age 86) Zhukovsky, Moscow Oblast, Russian SFSR, Soviet Union
- Died: September 28, 2013 (aged 73) Moscow, Russia
- Position: Defense
- Played for: HC SKA Kuybyshev (1960–1962); CSKA Moscow (1962–1972)
- National team: Soviet Union
- Playing career: 1960–1972
Medal record
Men's ice hockey
Representing Soviet Union
Olympic Games
Gold medal – first place	1968 Grenoble	Team
Gold medal – first place	1972 Sapporo	Team
World Championships
Gold medal – first place	1969 Sweden	Team
Gold medal – first place	1970 Sweden	Team
Gold medal – first place	1971 Switzerland	Team
Silver medal – second place	1972 Czechoslovakia

Igor Anatolievich Romishevsky (March 25, 1940 – September 28, 2013) was a Russian ice hockey player who played in the Soviet Hockey League. At the 1968 Winter Olympics and 1972 Winter Olympics he won the gold medals with the Soviet team. He was gold medalist of the World Championships from 1969 to 1971 and silver medalist in 1972.

Romishevsky was born in Zhukovsky, Moscow Oblast. He graduated from Moscow Forest Engineering Institute 1969 and received his PhD degree in 1974.

During his professional hockey career he played with HC CSKA Moscow.

He was later inducted into the Russian and Soviet Hockey Hall of Fame in 1968.

In 1974–1979 Romishevsky was a chair of Sports Department at Moscow Institute of Physics and Technology. Since 1979 he was a head coach of SKA Leningrad for two seasons. In 1984–1990 Romishevsky was a head coach of SKA Novosibirsk.

He died at age 73, on 28 September 2013, in Moscow.
