= Alexander Pashkov =

Russian ice hockey player (born 1944)

Personal information
- Full name: Alexander Konstantinovich Pashkov
- Born: August 28, 1944 Moscow, Russian SFSR, Soviet Union

Alexander Pashkov
Medal record

Men's ice hockey

Representing Soviet Union

Olympic Games
Gold medal – first place	1972 Sapporo	Team

World Championships
Gold medal – first place	1978 Prague	

Alexander Konstantinovich Pashkov (born August 28, 1944 in Moscow, Soviet Union) is a retired ice hockey player who played goaltender in the Soviet Hockey League. He played for HC Dynamo Moscow, HC Lokomotiv Moscow, HC CSKA Moscow, and Krylya Sovetov Moscow. He was inducted into the Russian and Soviet Hockey Hall of Fame in 1978. He is a recipient of the Medal "For Labour Valour".

Pashkov won a gold medal at the 1972 Winter Olympics and the 1978 World Hockey Championships, both times as a back up to goal tending legend Vladislav Tretiak.

== Career statistics ==
=== International ===
Year	Team	Event	GP	W	L	T	MIN	GA	SO	GAA	SV%
1972	Soviet Union	Summit Series	0	0	0	0	0	0	0	-	—
1972	Soviet Union	OLY	1	1	0	0	60	3	0	3.00	.850
1978	Soviet Union	WC	2	2	0	0	120	5	0	2.50	-
Senior totals			3	3	0	0	180	8	0	2.67	—
