= Alla Butova =

Russian speed skater (1950–2016)

Personal information
- Born: 22 January 1950 Ivanovo, Soviet Union
- Died: 24 September 2016 (aged 66)
- Height: 172 cm (5 ft 8 in)
- Weight: 66 kg (146 lb)

Sport
- Country: Soviet Union
- Sport: Speed skating
- Club: Dynamo Ivanovo

Achievements and titles
- Personal best(s): 500 m – 43.7 (1973); 1000 m – 1:32.3 (1970); 1500 m – 2:23.6 (1970); 3000 m – 5:06.4 (1970)

Alla Aleksandrovna Butova (Russian: Алла Александровна Бутова; 22 January 1950 – 24 September 2016) was a Russian speed skater. She competed in the 500 m event at the 1972 Winter Olympics and finished eighth.
