= Yuri Skobov =

Soviet and Russian cross-country skier (1949–2024)

Medal record

Men's cross-country skiing

Olympic Games
Gold medal – first place	1972 Sapporo	4 × 10 km

World Championships
Silver medal – second place	1974 Falun	4 × 10 km

Yuri Georgievich Skobov (Russian: Юрий Георгиевич Скобов; 13 March 1949 – 5 August 2024) was a Soviet and Russian cross-country skier who competed in the early 1970s, training at Spartak in Omutninsk. He won the 4 × 10 km gold at the 1972 Winter Olympics in Sapporo for the USSR. Skobov also finished 5th in the 15 km event at those same games. He also won a silver medal in the 4 × 10 km relay at the 1974 FIS Nordic World Ski Championships in Falun. Skobov died on 5 August 2024, at the age of 75.
