= Vladimir Voronkov =

Soviet-Russian cross-country skier

Medal record

Men's cross-country skiing

Representing Soviet Union

Olympic Games
Gold medal – first place	1972 Sapporo	4 x 10 km

World Championships
Gold medal – first place	1970 Vysoké Tatry	4 x 10 km

Vladimir Petrovich Voronkov (Russian: Владимир Петрович Воронков; 20 March 1944 – 25 September 2018) was a Russian cross-country skier who competed in the late 1960s and early 1970s, training at the Armed Forces sports society in Moscow. He won the 4 x 10 km gold at the 1972 Winter Olympics in Sapporo for the USSR. Voronkov also finished 4th in the 30 km event at the 1968 Winter Olympics in Grenoble

He also won a gold medal at the 1970 FIS Nordic World Ski Championships in the 4 x 10 km relay.
