= Gennadiy Tsygankov =

Russian ice hockey player (1947–2006)

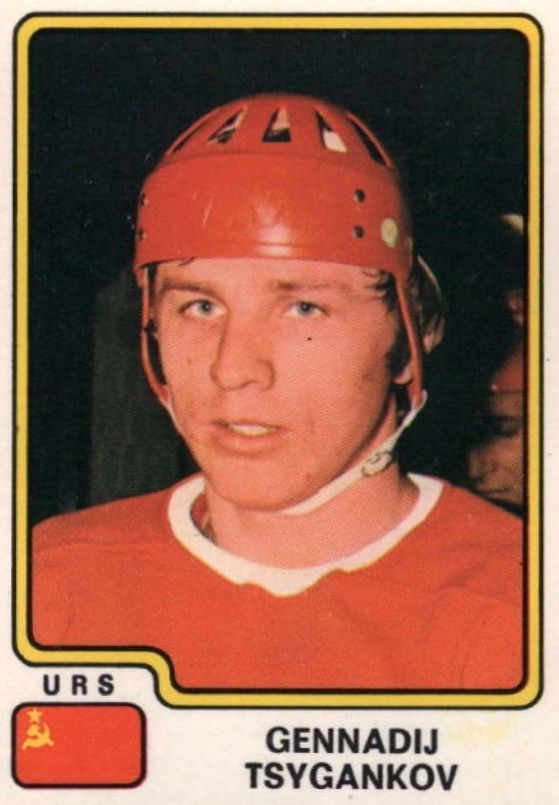

Personal information
- Full name: Gennadiy Dmitrievich Tsygankov
- Born: 16 August 1947 Vanino, Soviet Union
- Died: 16 February 2006 (aged 58) Saint Petersburg, Russia
Medal record
Men's ice hockey
Representing Soviet Union
Olympic Games
Gold medal – first place	1972 Sapporo	Team
Gold medal – first place	1976 Innsbruck	Team
World Championships
Gold medal – first place	1971 Switzerland
Silver medal – second place	1972 Czechoslovakia
Gold medal – first place	1973 Soviet Union
Gold medal – first place	1974 Finland
Gold medal – first place	1975 West Germany
Silver medal – second place	1976 Poland
Bronze medal – third place	1977 Austria
Gold medal – first place	1978 Czechoslovakia
Gold medal – first place	1979 Soviet Union

Gennadiy Dmitrievich Tsygankov (Russian: Геннадий Дмитриевич Цыганков; 16 August 1947 in Vanino, Soviet Union – 16 February 2006 in Saint Petersburg) was a Soviet and Russian ice hockey player and coach. He trained at the Armed Forces sports society.

== Career achievements ==
- Olympic champion (2): 1972, 1976
- World Champion (6): 1971–1973, 1975, 1978–1979
- European Champion (5): 1973–1975, 1978–1979
- Champion of USSR (8): 1970–73, 1975, 1977–79
- Participant in the 1972 Summit Series and the 1974 Summit Series
- Winner of 1979 Challenge Cup

== Clubs ==
- SKA Khabarovsk: 1962–69
- CSKA Moscow: 1969–79
- SKA Leningrad: 1980
