= Vyacheslav Vedenin =

Soviet cross-country skier (1941–2021)

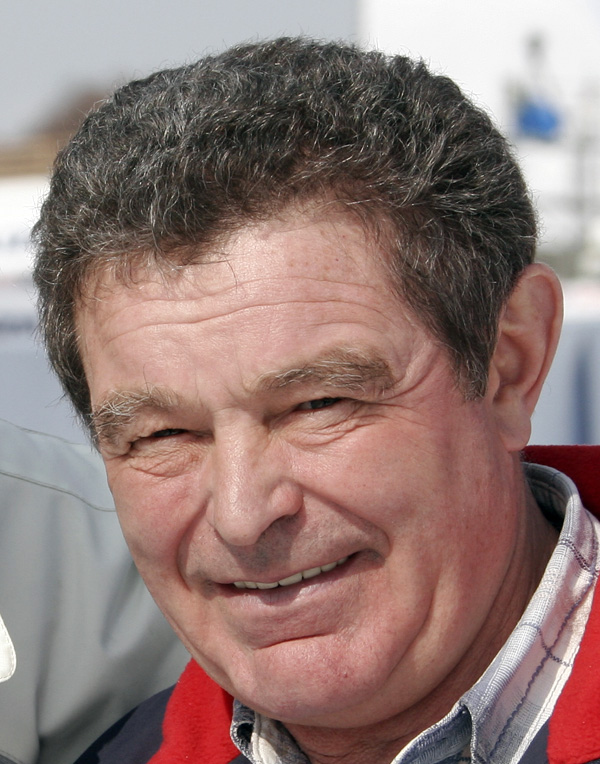
- Vedenin in 2007

Personal information
- Full name: Vyacheslav Petrovich Vedenin
- Born: 1 October 1941 Sloboda, Tula Oblast, Russian SFSR, USSR
- Died: 22 October 2021 (aged 80)
- Height: 164 cm (5 ft 5 in)
- Weight: 64 kg (141 lb)

Sport
- Sport: Cross-country skiing
- Club: Dynamo Moscow
- Coached by: Pavel Kolchin; Vasili Smirnov
Medal record
Olympic Games
Silver medal – second place	1968 Grenoble	50 km
Gold medal – first place	1972 Sapporo	30 km
Gold medal – first place	1972 Sapporo	4×10 km
Bronze medal – third place	1972 Sapporo	50 km
World Championships
Gold medal – first place	1970 Vysoké Tatry	30 km
Gold medal – first place	1970 Vysoké Tatry	4×10 km
Silver medal – second place	1970 Vysoké Tatry	50 km

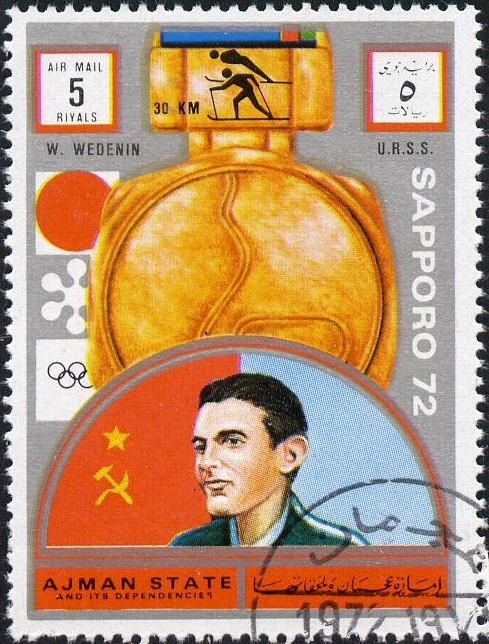
Vedenin on a stamp of Ajman

Vyacheslav Petrovich Vedenin (Russian: Вячесла́в Петро́вич Веденин; 1 October 1941 – 22 October 2021) was a Soviet cross-country skier. His silver medal over 50 km was the only medal won by a Soviet male skier at the 1968 Olympics, as his 4×10 km team placed fourth. At the next Olympics he was the Olympic flag bearer for the Soviet Union and won three medals, with golds in the 30 km and 4×10 km and a bronze in the 50 km. In the 4×10 km event Vedenin ran the last leg and won by 10 seconds, despite starting with a one-minute lag from Norway. His gold in the 30 km was the first individual win for a Soviet male skier at the Winter Olympics.

Vedenin also won three medals at the 1970 World Championships with two golds (30 km, 4x10 km) and one silver (50 km). After retiring from competitions he coached skiers at Dynamo Moscow, for which he competed through his entire career.

Vedenin was awarded the Order of the Red Banner of Labour (1970) and Order of Lenin (1972). Since 1989 a competition "Vedenin's Ski Track" («Лыжня Веденина») is held yearly in Dubna, Dubensky District, in his honor.

Vedenin had two sons, Vyacheslav and Andrey. Vyacheslav is an international skiing referee who worked at the 2014 Winter Olympics and also took Olympic Oath on behalf of officials. Andrei is a former biathlon competitor.
