= Olympic record =

Records set at the Olympic Games

Olympic records are the best performances recorded in the history of a specific event at either the Summer Olympic Games or the Winter Olympic Games.

== Summer Olympics ==
- Archery (list)
- Athletics (list)
- Cycling (list)
- Rowing (list) (Note: There are not technically Olympic records but worlds fastest times have been recorded at the Olympics)
- Shooting (list)
- Sport climbing
- Swimming (list)
- Weightlifting (list)

== Winter Olympics ==
- Ice hockey (Men) (list)
- Ice hockey (Women) (list)
- Short-track speed skating (list)
- Speed skating (list)

== See also ==
- Commonwealth Games records
