= List of Olympic records in ice hockey =

List of Olympic records in ice hockey could refer to:

- List of men's Olympic records in ice hockey
- List of women's Olympic records in ice hockey
