= List of men's Olympic records in ice hockey =

This is a list of records and statistics of the ice hockey tournament in the Olympic games for men ever since the inaugural official edition in 1920. This list is focused on which hockey players were the greatest among each nation, showcasing their importance in achieving medals for their country.

Ice hockey has been contested at the Olympic Winter Games since 1920 for men, producing a history of individual and team achievements tracked by the International Ice Hockey Federation (IIHF) and the International Olympic Committee (IOC). Notable records, such as Harry Watson's longstanding single-tournament goals mark of 36 from 1924, Teemu Selänne's all-time Olympic points total of 43, or various fastest goals and largest margins of victory, have been highlighted in comprehensive overviews and statistical compilations by major sports media.

== Medal table ==
This table below includes all medals won in ice hockey during the Olympic Games.

Rank	Nation	Gold	Silver	Bronze	Total
1	Canada	9	5	3	17
2	Soviet Union	7	1	1	9
3	United States	3	8	1	12
4	Sweden	2	3	4	9
5	Finland	1	2	5	8
6	Czech Republic	1	0	1	2
6	Great Britain	1	0	1	2
8	Olympic Athletes from Russia	1	0	0	1
8	Unified Team	1	0	0	1
10	Czechoslovakia	0	4	4	8
11	Germany	0	1	1	2
11	Russia	0	1	1	2
13	ROC	0	1	0	1
14	Switzerland	0	0	2	2
15	Slovakia	0	0	1	1
15	West Germany	0	0	1	1
Totals (16 entries)		26	26	26	78

== Individual records ==
=== Players who won the Olympic gold twice or more ===
Player	Team	Gold medals
(Soviet Union) Vitali Davydov	Soviet Union	1964, 1968, 1972
(Soviet Union) Anatoli Firsov	Soviet Union	1964, 1968, 1972
(Soviet Union) Viktor Kuzkin	Soviet Union	1964, 1968, 1972
(Soviet Union) Alexander Ragulin	Soviet Union	1964, 1968, 1972
(Soviet Union) Vladislav Tretiak	Soviet Union	1972, 1976, 1984
(Soviet Union) (Unified Team at the Olympics) Andrei Khomutov	Soviet Union; Unified Team	1984, 1988, 1992
(Soviet Union) Veniamin Alexandrov	Soviet Union	1964, 1968
(Soviet Union) Viktor Konovalenko	Soviet Union	1964, 1968
(Soviet Union) Boris Mayorov	Soviet Union	1964, 1968
(Soviet Union) Vyacheslav Starshinov	Soviet Union	1964, 1968
(Soviet Union) Oleg Zaytsev	Soviet Union	1964, 1968
(Soviet Union) Yevgeni Mishakov	Soviet Union	1968, 1972
(Soviet Union) Igor Romishevsky	Soviet Union	1968, 1972
(Soviet Union) Vladimir Vikulov	Soviet Union	1968, 1972
(Soviet Union) Yevgeni Zimin	Soviet Union	1968, 1972
(Soviet Union) Valeri Kharlamov	Soviet Union	1972, 1976
(Soviet Union) Vladimir Lutchenko	Soviet Union	1972, 1976
(Soviet Union) Alexander Maltsev	Soviet Union	1972, 1976
(Soviet Union) Boris Mikhailov	Soviet Union	1972, 1976
(Soviet Union) Vladimir Petrov	Soviet Union	1972, 1976
(Soviet Union) Vladimir Shadrin	Soviet Union	1972, 1976
(Soviet Union) Gennadiy Tsygankov	Soviet Union	1972, 1976
(Soviet Union) Valeri Vasiliev	Soviet Union	1972, 1976
(Soviet Union) Alexander Yakushev	Soviet Union	1972, 1976
(Soviet Union) Viacheslav Fetisov	Soviet Union	1984, 1988
(Soviet Union) Alexei Kasatonov	Soviet Union	1984, 1988
(Soviet Union) Alexander Kozhevnikov	Soviet Union	1984, 1988
(Soviet Union) Vladimir Krutov	Soviet Union	1984, 1988
(Soviet Union) Igor Larionov	Soviet Union	1984, 1988
(Soviet Union) Sergei Makarov	Soviet Union	1984, 1988
(Soviet Union) Sergei Starikov	Soviet Union	1984, 1988
(Soviet Union) Igor Stelnov	Soviet Union	1984, 1988
(Soviet Union) (Unified Team at the Olympics) Vyacheslav Bykov	Soviet Union; Unified Team	1988, 1992
(Soviet Union) (Unified Team at the Olympics) Igor Kravchuk	Soviet Union; Unified Team	1988, 1992
(Sweden) Peter Forsberg	Sweden	1994, 2006
(Sweden) Jörgen Jönsson	Sweden	1994, 2006
(Sweden) Kenny Jönsson	Sweden	1994, 2006
(Canada) Martin Brodeur	Canada	2002, 2010
(Canada) Jarome Iginla	Canada	2002, 2010
(Canada) Scott Niedermayer	Canada	2002, 2010
(Canada) Chris Pronger	Canada	2002, 2010
(Canada) Patrice Bergeron	Canada	2010, 2014
(Canada) Sidney Crosby	Canada	2010, 2014
(Canada) Drew Doughty	Canada	2010, 2014
(Canada) Ryan Getzlaf	Canada	2010, 2014
(Canada) Duncan Keith	Canada	2010, 2014
(Canada) Roberto Luongo	Canada	2010, 2014
(Canada) Patrick Marleau	Canada	2010, 2014
(Canada) Rick Nash	Canada	2010, 2014
(Canada) Corey Perry	Canada	2010, 2014
(Canada) Jonathan Toews	Canada	2010, 2014
(Canada) Shea Weber	Canada	2010, 2014

=== Most goals scored all-time ===
Rank	Player	Team	Goals
1	(Canada) Harry Watson	Canada	37
2	(United States) Herbert Drury	United States	28
3	(Switzerland) Ulrich Poltera	Switzerland	25
4	(Sweden) Sven Johansson	Sweden	24
4	(Finland) Teemu Selänne	Finland	24
6	(Czech Republic) Vladimir Zabrodsky	Czech Republic	23
7	(Czech Republic) Vlastimil Bubnik	Czech Republic	22
8	(Canada) Wally Halder	Canada	21
9	(Canada) Bert McCaffrey	Canada	20
10	(United Kingdom) Eric Carruthers	Great Britain	21

=== Most points scored all-time ===
Rank	Player	Team	Points
1	(Finland) Teemu Selänne	Finland	43
2	(Canada) Harry Watson	Canada	37
2	(Czech Republic) Vlastimil Bubnik	Czech Republic	37
4	(Soviet Union) Valeri Kharlamov	Soviet Union	36
5	(Soviet Union) Vyacheslav Fetisov	Soviet Union	33
6	(Soviet Union) Alexander Maltsev	Soviet Union	31
6	(West Germany) Erich Kühnhackl	West Germany	31
6	(Soviet Union) Vladimir Krutov	Soviet Union	31
9	(Soviet Union) Anatoly Firsov	Soviet Union	30
9	(Finland) Saku Koivu	Finland	30

=== Most games played all-time ===
Rank	Player	Team	GP
1	(Finland) Raimo Helminen	Finland	39
2	(Finland) Teemu Selänne	Finland	37
3	(Germany) Dieter Hegen	Germany	33
3	(Germany) Udo Kiessling	Germany	33
5	(Finland) Jere Lehtinen	Finland	32
6	(Finland) Kimmo Timonen	Finland	30
7	(Sweden) Sven Johansson	Sweden	29
7	(Russia) Pavel Datsyuk	Russia	29
7	(Russia) Ilya Kovalchuk	Russia	29
7	(Germany) Andreas Niederberger	Germany	29

=== Top scorers by tournament ===
Year	Player(s)	Points
1920	(Canada) Frank Frederickson	12
1924	(Canada) Harry Watson	37
1928	(Canada) Hugh Plaxton (Canada) Dave Trottier	12
1932	(United States) Winthrop Palmer (Canada) Walter Monson	11
1936	(Canada) Hugh Farquharson	20
1948	(Canada) Wally Halder	27
1952	(Canada) Billy Gibson	19
1956	(Canada) Paul Knox (Canada) Jim Logan (Italy) Aldo Maniacco	12
1960	(Canada) Fred Etcher	21
1964	(Japan) Masahiro Sato	14
1968	(Soviet Union) Anatoly Firsov	14
1972	(Soviet Union) Valeri Kharlamov	16
1976	(Soviet Union) Vladimir Shadrin (Soviet Union) Alexander Maltsev	14
1980	(Czech Republic) Milan Novy	15
1984	(Germany) Erich Kühnhackl	14
1988	(Soviet Union) Vladimir Krutov	15
1992	(Canada) Joe Juneau	15
1994	(Slovakia) Zigmund Palffy	10
1998	(Finland) Teemu Selänne (Finland) Saku Koivu	10
2002	(Sweden) Mats Sundin	9
2006	(Finland) Teemu Selänne (Finland) Saku Koivu	11
2010	(Slovakia) Pavol Demitra	10
2014	(United States) Phil Kessel (Sweden) Erik Karlsson	8
2018	(Russia) Nikita Gusev	12
2022	(Slovakia) Juraj Slafkovsky (Finland) Sakari Manninen (Canada) Adam Tambellini (Finland) Teemu Hartikainen	7
2026	(Canada) Connor McDavid	13

=== Other individual ===
Description	Record	Details	Source
Most Olympic ice hockey medals	4	(Soviet Union) Vladislav Tretiak (gold: 1972, 1976 , 1984 - silver: 1980) (Soviet Union) (International Olympic Committee) (Russia) Igor Kravchuk (gold: 1988, 1992 - silver: 1998 - bronze: 2002) (Czech Republic) Jiří Holík (silver: 1968, 1976 - bronze: 1964, 1972) (Finland) Saku Koivu (silver: 2006 - bronze: 1994, 1998, 2010) (Finland) Jere Lehtinen (silver: 2006 - bronze: 1994, 1998, 2010) (Finland) Ville Peltonen (silver: 2006 - bronze: 1994, 1998, 2010) (Finland) Teemu Selänne (silver: 2006 - bronze: 1998, 2010, 2014) (Finland) Kimmo Timonen (silver: 2006 - bronze: 1998, 2010, 2014)	
Most Olympic Games appearances	6	(Finland) Raimo Helminen (1984, 1988, 1992, 1994, 1998, 2002) (Finland) Teemu Selänne (1992, 1998, 2002, 2006, 2010, 2014)	
Most points scored in a tournament	37	(Canada) Harry Watson (1924)	
Most points scored in a match	13	Harry Watson (1924 Canada vs Czechoslovakia)	
Youngest appearance	16 Years, 4 Months	(Switzerland) Bibi Torriani	
Oldest goalscorer	43 years, 234 days	(Finland) Teemu Selänne	

== Team records ==
=== Medals ===
Description	Record	Details	Ref.
Most gold medals won	9	Canada	
Most finishes in the top two	14	Canada	
Most finishes in the top three	17	Canada	
Most finishes in the top four	21	Canada	
Most appearances	25	United States; Germany	

=== Consecutive ===
Description	Record	Details	Ref.
Most consecutive golds	4	Canada (1920, 1924, 1928, 1932); Soviet Union (1964, 1968, 1972, 1976)	
Most consecutive silvers	2	Canada (1992, 1994); United States (1920, 1924) and (1952, 1956)	
Most consecutive bronzes	3	Sweden (1980, 1984, 1988)	
Most consecutive top three finishes	9	Canada (1920 to 1960); Soviet Union (1956 to 1988)	
Most consecutive matches won	17	Canada (1920 - 3 wins, 1924 - 6 wins, 1928 - 3 wins, 1932 - 5 wins)	
Most consecutive appearances	23	United States (1932–2026) (ongoing)	

=== Other ===
Description	Record	Details	Ref.
Longest gap between gold medals	50 years	Canada (1952–2002)	
Longest gap between appearances in the top two	36 years	Sweden (1928–1964)	
Best finish by host team	1st	United States (1960, 1980); Canada (2010)	
Most finishes in the top two without ever being champion	4	(Czech Republic) Czechoslovakia	
Most finishes in the top three without ever being champion	8	(Czech Republic) Czechoslovakia	
Most finishes in the top four without ever being champion	10	(Czech Republic) Czechoslovakia	

== Tournament records ==
=== Goalscoring ===
Description	Record	Details	Ref.
Most points scored in a tournament			
Fewest points scored in a tournament			
Most points per match in a tournament			
Fewest points per match in a tournament			

=== Attendance ===
Description	Record	Details	Ref.
Highest average of attendance per match			
Lowest average of attendance per match			
