= List of women's Olympic records in ice hockey =

This is a list of records and statistics of the ice hockey tournament in the Olympic games for women ever since the inaugural official edition in 1998.

Women's ice hockey debuted at the Olympic Winter Games in 1998 and has since featured intense competition, with records in scoring, goaltending, and team performance compiled and analysed by official bodies and media outlets. Standout achievements, such as Hilary Knight's career Olympic goals and points marks for the United States, or records for most medals by players like Jayna Hefford and Hayley Wickenheiser, have received coverage in event summaries, player profiles, and post-tournament statistical roundups.

As the tournament has grown in prominence, these records are regularly referenced in discussions of Olympic women's hockey milestones.

== Medal table ==
This table below includes all medals won in ice hockey during the Olympic Games.

Rank	Nation	Gold	Silver	Bronze	Total
1	Canada	5	3	0	8
2	United States	3	4	1	8
3	Sweden	0	1	1	2
4	Finland	0	0	4	4
5	Switzerland	0	0	2	2
Totals (5 entries)		8	8	8	24

== Individual records ==
=== Players who won the Olympic gold twice or more ===
Player	Team	Gold medals
(Canada) Jayna Hefford	Canada	2002, 2006, 2010, 2014
(Canada) Caroline Ouellette	Canada	2002, 2006, 2010, 2014
(Canada) Hayley Wickenheiser	Canada	2002, 2006, 2010, 2014
(Canada) Jennifer Botterill	Canada	2002, 2006, 2010
(Canada) Becky Kellar	Canada	2002, 2006, 2010
(Canada) Cherie Piper	Canada	2002, 2006, 2010
(Canada) Colleen Sostorics	Canada	2002, 2006, 2010
(Canada) Kim St-Pierre	Canada	2002, 2006, 2010
(Canada) Meghan Agosta	Canada	2006, 2010, 2014
(Canada) Gillian Apps	Canada	2006, 2010, 2014
(Canada) Charline Labonté	Canada	2006, 2010, 2014
(Canada) Rebecca Johnston	Canada	2010, 2014, 2022
(Canada) Marie-Philip Poulin	Canada	2010, 2014, 2022
(Canada) Brianne Jenner	Canada	2014, 2022
(Canada) Jocelyne Larocque	Canada	2014, 2022
(Canada) Natalie Spooner	Canada	2014, 2022
(United States) Kendall Coyne	United States	2018, 2026
(United States) Hilary Knight	United States	2018, 2026
(United States) Lee Stecklein	United States	2018, 2026

=== Most goals scored all-time ===
Rank	Player	Team	Goals
1	(Canada) Marie-Philip Poulin	Canada	20
2	(Canada) Hayley Wickenheiser	Canada	18
3	(Canada) Meghan Agosta	Canada	17
4	(Switzerland) Alina Müller	Switzerland	16
5	(Canada) Cherie Piper	Canada	15
5	(Canada) Danielle Goyette	Canada	15
5	(United States) Hilary Knight	United States	15
8	(United States) Natalie Darwitz	United States	14
8	(United States) Katie King-Crowley	United States	14
10	(Switzerland) Stefanie Marty	Switzerland	13
10	(Canada) Jayna Hefford	Canada	13

=== Most points scored all-time ===
Rank	Player	Team	Points
1	(Canada) Hayley Wickenheiser	Canada	51
2	(Canada) Marie-Philip Poulin	Canada	39
3	(United States) Hilary Knight	United States	33
4	(United States) Jenny Potter	United States	32
5	(Canada) Cherie Piper	Canada	30
5	(Canada) Jayna Hefford	Canada	30
7	(Switzerland) Alina Müller	Switzerland	29
8	(Canada) Meghan Agosta	Canada	28
9	(Canada) Caroline Ouellette	Canada	26
9	(Canada) Rebecca Johnston	Canada	26

=== Most games played all-time ===
Rank	Player	Team	GP
1	(United States) Hilary Knight	United States	29
1	(Finland) Michelle Karvinen	Finland	29
1	(Switzerland) Nicole Bullo	Switzerland	29
4	(Finland) Jenni Hiirikoski	Finland	28
5	(Canada) Marie-Philip Poulin	Canada	27
5	(Finland) Karoliina Rantamäki	Finland	27
7	(Canada) Hayley Wickenheiser	Canada	26
7	(Canada) Jayna Hefford	Canada	26
7	(Switzerland) Alina Müller	Switzerland	26
10	(Switzerland) Lara Stalder	Switzerland	25
10	(Finland) Emma Terho	Finland	25

=== Top scorers by tournament ===
Year	Player(s)	Points
1998	(Finland) Riikka Sallinen	12
2002	(Canada) Hayley Wickenheiser (United States) Cammi Granato (Canada) Danielle Goyette	10
2006	(Canada) Hayley Wickenheiser	17
2010	(Canada) Meghan Agosta	15
2014	(Finland) Michelle Karvinen (Sweden) Pernilla Winberg	7
2018	(Switzerland) Alina Müller	10
2022	(Canada) Sarah Nurse	18
2026	(United States) Megan Keller (United States) Caroline Harvey	9

=== Other individual ===
Description	Record	Details	Ref.
Most Olympic ice hockey medals	5	(Canada) Jayna Hefford (gold: 2002, 2006, 2010, 2014 - silver: 1998) (Canada) Hayley Wickenheiser (gold: 2002, 2006, 2010, 2014 - silver: 1998) (Canada) Marie-Philip Poulin (gold: 2010, 2014, 2022 - silver: 2018, 2026) (United States) Hilary Knight (gold: 2018, 2026 - silver: 2010, 2014, 2022)	
Youngest medal winner	15 years, 345 days	(Switzerland) Alina Müller (bronze: 2014)	
Oldest medal winner	44 years, 254 days	(Finland) Riikka Sallinen (bronze: 2018)	
Most points scored in a tournament	18	(Canada) Sarah Nurse (2022)	

== Team records ==
=== Medals ===
Description	Record	Details	Ref.
Most gold medals won	5	Canada	
Most finishes in the top two	8	Canada	
Most finishes in the top three	8	Canada; United States	
Most finishes in the top four	8	Canada; United States	
Most appearances	8	Canada; United States; Sweden; Finland	

=== Consecutive ===
Description	Record	Details	Ref.
Most consecutive golds	4	Canada (2002, 2006, 2010, 2014)	
Most consecutive silvers	2	United States (2010, 2014)	
Most consecutive bronzes	2	Finland (2018, 2022)	
Most consecutive top three finishes	8	Canada (1998 to 2026) (ongoing); United States (1998 to 2026) (ongoing)	
Most consecutive matches won	24	Canada (2002 - 5 wins, 2006 - 5 wins, 2010 - 5 wins, 2014 - 5 wins, 2018 - 4 wins)	
Most consecutive appearances	8	Canada (1998 to 2026) (ongoing); United States (1998 to 2026) (ongoing); Sweden (1998 to 2026) (ongoing); Finland (1998 to 2026) (ongoing)	

=== Other ===
Description	Record	Details	Ref.
Longest gap between gold medals	20 years	United States (1998 - 2018)	
Longest gap between appearances in the top two	8 years	United States (2002 - 2010)	
Best finish by host team	1st	Canada (2010)	
Most finishes in the top two without ever being champion	1	Sweden	
Most finishes in the top three without ever being champion	4	Finland	
Most finishes in the top four without ever being champion	6	Finland	

== Tournament records ==
=== Goalscoring ===
Description	Record	Details	Ref.
Most points scored in a tournament			
Fewest points scored in a tournament			
Most points per match in a tournament			
Fewest points per match in a tournament			

=== Attendance ===
Description	Record	Details	Ref.
Highest average of attendance per match			
Lowest average of attendance per match			
