= Ice hockey at the 2010 Winter Olympics =

Ice hockey at the XXI Olympic Winter Games
- Venues: Canada Hockey Place; UBC Winter Sports Centre
- Dates: 13–28 February 2010
- Competitors: 444 from 13 nations

Men's ice hockey at the XXI Olympic Winter Games

Medalists
1st place, gold medalist(s)		Canada
2nd place, silver medalist(s)		United States
3rd place, bronze medalist(s)		Finland

Women's ice hockey at the XXI Olympic Winter Games

Medalists
1st place, gold medalist(s)		Canada
2nd place, silver medalist(s)		United States
3rd place, bronze medalist(s)		Finland

Ice hockey at the 2010 Winter Olympics was held at Rogers Arena (then known as GM Place, and renamed Canada Hockey Place for the duration of the Games due to IOC sponsorship rules) in Vancouver, home of the National Hockey League's Vancouver Canucks, and at UBC Winter Sports Centre, home of the Canadian Interuniversity Sport's UBC Thunderbirds. Twelve teams competed in the men's event and eight teams competed in the women's event. Canada won both tournaments with victories against the United States, while Finland won both bronze games, albeit against different opponents.

It was the fifth Olympic appearance for the Finns Jere Lehtinen and Teemu Selänne, thus making them only the sixth and seventh hockey players to compete at five Olympics after Udo Kießling, Petter Thoresen, Raimo Helminen, Dieter Hegen and Denis Perez (at the time, Helminen was the only ice hockey player to compete at six Olympics, but Selänne would join the group during the 2014 Sochi Olympics).

== Medal summary ==
=== Medal table ===
Rank	Nation	Gold	Silver	Bronze	Total
1	Canada	2	0	0	2
2	United States	0	2	0	2
3	Finland	0	0	2	2
Totals (3 entries)		2	2	2	6

=== Medalists ===
Event	Gold	Silver	Bronze
Men's	Canada; Patrice Bergeron; Dan Boyle; Martin Brodeur; Sidney Crosby; Drew Doughty; Marc-André Fleury; Ryan Getzlaf; Dany Heatley; Jarome Iginla; Duncan Keith; Roberto Luongo; Patrick Marleau; Brenden Morrow; Rick Nash; Scott Niedermayer; Corey Perry; Chris Pronger; Mike Richards; Brent Seabrook; Eric Staal; Joe Thornton; Jonathan Toews; Shea Weber	United States; David Backes; Dustin Brown; Ryan Callahan; Chris Drury; Tim Gleason; Erik Johnson; Jack Johnson; Patrick Kane; Ryan Kesler; Phil Kessel; Jamie Langenbrunner; Ryan Malone; Ryan Miller; Brooks Orpik; Zach Parise; Joe Pavelski; Jonathan Quick; Brian Rafalski; Bobby Ryan; Paul Stastny; Ryan Suter; Tim Thomas; Ryan Whitney	Finland; Niklas Bäckström; Valtteri Filppula; Niklas Hagman; Jarkko Immonen; Olli Jokinen; Niko Kapanen; Miikka Kiprusoff; Mikko Koivu; Saku Koivu; Lasse Kukkonen; Jere Lehtinen; Sami Lepistö; Toni Lydman; Antti Miettinen; Antero Niittymäki; Janne Niskala; Ville Peltonen; Joni Pitkänen; Jarkko Ruutu; Tuomo Ruutu; Sami Salo; Teemu Selänne; Kimmo Timonen
Women's	Canada; Meghan Agosta; Gillian Apps; Tessa Bonhomme; Jennifer Botterill; Jayna Hefford; Haley Irwin; Rebecca Johnston; Becky Kellar; Gina Kingsbury; Charline Labonté; Carla MacLeod; Meaghan Mikkelson; Caroline Ouellette; Cherie Piper; Marie-Philip Poulin; Kim St-Pierre; Colleen Sostorics; Shannon Szabados; Sarah Vaillancourt; Catherine Ward; Hayley Wickenheiser	United States; Kacey Bellamy; Caitlin Cahow; Lisa Chesson; Julie Chu; Natalie Darwitz; Meghan Duggan; Molly Engstrom; Hilary Knight; Jocelyne Lamoureux; Monique Lamoureux; Erika Lawler; Gigi Marvin; Brianne McLaughlin; Jenny Schmidgall-Potter; Angela Ruggiero; Molly Schaus; Kelli Stack; Karen Thatcher; Jessie Vetter; Kerry Weiland; Jinelle Zaugg-Siergiej	Finland; Anne Helin; Jenni Hiirikoski; Venla Hovi; Michelle Karvinen; Mira Kuisma; Emma Laaksonen; Rosa Lindstedt; Terhi Mertanen; Heidi Pelttari; Mariia Posa; Annina Rajahuhta; Karoliina Rantamäki; Noora Räty; Mari Saarinen; Saija Sirviö; Nina Tikkinen; Minnamari Tuominen; Saara Tuominen; Linda Välimäki; Anna Vanhatalo; Marjo Voutilainen

== Changes from previous tournaments ==
For the first time, Olympic Games were played on a narrower NHL-sized ice rink, measuring 61 m × 26 m (200 ft × 85 ft), instead of the international size of 61 m × 30 m (200 ft × 98 ft). By permitting the use of existing venues without rink modifications, this was expected to save $10 million (CAD) in construction costs and allow more spectators to attend games.

This was also the first Olympics in which the four-official system, with two referees and two linesmen, was used during the men's tournament. The NHL began using the two-referee system in the 1998–99 season and full-time in the 2000–01 season and all playoff games since 1999, while the IIHF first started using it in its major men's championship tournaments in the 2008 IIHF World Championship. However, for the women's tournament in Vancouver, the IIHF used the standard three-official system with one referee and two linesmen, saying that the four-official system is not currently needed in women's international hockey.

== Venues ==
The games of the 2010 tournament were held at the 6,800 seat UBC Winter Sports Centre and 18,810 seat General Motors Place, which was renamed Canada Hockey Place during the event because corporate sponsorship is not allowed for an Olympic venue. The games were played on a North American ice surface which is four metres narrower than international rinks.

The games of the tournament forced the Vancouver Canucks to play the longest road trip in NHL history, playing 14 games over six weeks, from 27 January to 13 March, so that GM Place could be used for the tournament. Because of the Olympics, the ice surface and boards needed to be devoid of advertising and some seating areas needed to be converted to press rows for the duration of the games.

== Men's tournament ==
Following negotiations in the National Hockey League's collective bargaining agreement, an agreement was reached allowing NHL participation in both the 2006 and 2010 Winter Olympics. Some NHL team owners opposed having their players participate in the tournament because of concerns that the league's players could get injured or become exhausted. Several players were injured during the 2006 Winter Olympics and were forced to miss NHL games. Gary Bettman addressed the issue saying that several format changes were being discussed, so that the tournament would be "a little easier for everybody."

=== Qualification ===
Qualification for the men's tournament at the 2010 Winter Olympics was structured around the 2008 IIHF World Ranking. The top nine teams in the World Ranking after the 2008 Men's World Ice Hockey Championships received automatic berths into the Olympics, while all remaining member federations could attempt to qualify for the remaining three spots in the Olympics. In October 2008, the four lowest entrants played off for a spot in the first round. Teams then ranked 19th through 30th played in a first qualification round in November 2008, where the top three teams from the round advance to the second qualification round. Teams ranked 10th through 18th joined the three top teams from the first qualifying round to play in a second qualification round. The top three teams from the second qualifying round advanced to the Olympic tournament.

=== Format ===
The twelve teams in the men's event are seeded into three groups of four teams. In the preliminary round, a team plays one game against every other team in its own group (for a total of 18 preliminary round games). Following the completion of the preliminary round, the teams are ranked 1 through 12 based on the results. The top four ranked teams receive byes to the quarterfinals, with the remaining eight teams playing for the remaining four quarterfinal positions. Following that, the final eight teams play elimination rounds to determine the gold and silver medals, and the two losing teams of the semi-finals play for the bronze medal. Each team is allowed to have 20 skaters (forwards and defensemen) and two or three goaltenders, all of whom must be citizens of the country they represent.

=== Participating nations ===
Group A	Group B	Group C
Canada; United States; Switzerland; Norway	Russia; Czech Republic; Slovakia; Latvia	Sweden; Finland; Belarus; Germany

== Women's tournament ==
=== Qualification ===
The women's tournament used a qualification format similar to the system used for the men's tournament. The top six teams in the IIHF Women's World Ranking after the 2008 Women's World Ice Hockey Championships received automatic berths into the Ice Hockey event. Lower ranked teams had an opportunity to qualify for the event. Teams ranked 13th and below were divided into two groups where they played in a first qualification round in September 2008. The two group winners from the round advanced to the second qualification round, where the teams ranked seventh through twelfth joined them.

=== Format ===
The eight teams were split into two divisions of four teams and each team played three preliminary games. Following the completion of the preliminary round, the top two teams from each division advanced to the medal round and competed in a playoff to determine the gold medalist. The other four played classification games. Each team is allowed to have between 15 and 18 skaters (forwards and defensemen) and either two or three goaltenders.

=== Participating nations ===
A total of eight national teams competed in the women's ice hockey tournament.

Group A	Group B
Canada; Sweden; Switzerland; Slovakia	United States; Finland; Russia; China

== Uniforms ==
Uniforms were produced by Kent Angus, who collaborated with the participating nations to incorporate "discovery pieces" into the jerseys. The extra details were national motifs noticeable up close.

== See also ==
- Ice sledge hockey at the 2010 Winter Paralympics
