= Ice hockey at the 2018 Winter Olympics =

Ice hockey at the XXIII Olympic Winter Games
- Ice hockey pictogram at the 2018 Winter Olympics
- Venues: Gangneung Hockey Centre; Kwandong Hockey Centre
- Dates: 10–25 February 2018
- No. of events: 2 (1 men, 1 women)
- Competitors: 496 from 14 nations

Men's ice hockey at the XXIII Olympic Winter Games

Medalists
1st place, gold medalist(s)		Olympic Athletes from Russia
2nd place, silver medalist(s)		Germany
3rd place, bronze medalist(s)		Canada

Women's ice hockey at the XXIII Olympic Winter Games

Medalists
1st place, gold medalist(s)		United States
2nd place, silver medalist(s)		Canada
3rd place, bronze medalist(s)		Finland

The ice hockey (hockey) competitions of the 2018 Winter Olympics were played at two venues within the Gangneung Coastal Cluster in Gangneung, South Korea. The Gangneung Hockey Centre, which seats 10,000, and the Kwandong Hockey Centre, which seats 6,000, were both originally scheduled to be completed in 2016 but appear to have been completed in early 2017. Both venues contain IIHF-sized rinks (60 by 30 m (196.85 by 98.43 ft)).

Twelve teams competed in the men's tournament, which was held from 14 to 25 February, while eight teams competed in the women's tournament, from 10 to 22 February. In a historic deal, the women's tournament featured a combined Korean team with an expanded roster.

== Medal summary ==
=== Medal table ===
Rank	Nation	Gold	Silver	Bronze	Total
1	Olympic Athletes from Russia	1	0	0	1
1	United States	1	0	0	1
3	Canada	0	1	1	2
4	Germany	0	1	0	1
5	Finland	0	0	1	1
Totals (5 entries)		2	2	2	6

=== Medalists ===
Event	Gold	Silver	Bronze
Men's	Olympic Athletes from Russia; Sergei Andronov; Alexander Barabanov; Pavel Datsyuk; Vladislav Gavrikov; Mikhail Grigorenko; Nikita Gusev; Ilya Kablukov; Sergey Kalinin; Kirill Kaprizov; Bogdan Kiselevich; Vasily Koshechkin; Ilya Kovalchuk; Alexey Marchenko; Sergei Mozyakin; Nikita Nesterov; Nikolai Prokhorkin; Igor Shestyorkin; Vadim Shipachyov; Sergei Shirokov; Ilya Sorokin; Ivan Telegin; Vyacheslav Voynov; Egor Yakovlev; Artyom Zub; Andrei Zubarev	Germany; Sinan Akdag; Danny aus den Birken; Daryl Boyle; Christian Ehrhoff; Yasin Ehliz; Dennis Endras; Gerrit Fauser; Marcel Goc; Patrick Hager; Frank Hördler; Dominik Kahun; Marcus Kink; Björn Krupp; Brooks Macek; Frank Mauer; Jonas Müller; Moritz Müller; Marcel Noebels; Leonhard Pföderl; Timo Pielmeier; Matthias Plachta; Patrick Reimer; Felix Schütz; Yannic Seidenberg; David Wolf	Canada; Rene Bourque; Gilbert Brulé; Andrew Ebbett; Stefan Elliott; Chay Genoway; Cody Goloubef; Marc-André Gragnani; Quinton Howden; Chris Kelly; Rob Klinkhammer; Brandon Kozun; Maxim Lapierre; Chris Lee; Maxim Noreau; Eric O'Dell; Justin Peters; Kevin Poulin; Mason Raymond; Mat Robinson; Derek Roy; Ben Scrivens; Karl Stollery; Christian Thomas; Linden Vey; Wojtek Wolski
Women's	United States; Cayla Barnes; Kacey Bellamy; Hannah Brandt; Kendall Coyne; Dani Cameranesi; Brianna Decker; Meghan Duggan; Kali Flanagan; Nicole Hensley; Megan Keller; Amanda Kessel; Hilary Knight; Jocelyne Lamoureux-Davidson; Monique Lamoureux-Morando; Gigi Marvin; Sidney Morin; Kelly Pannek; Amanda Pelkey; Emily Pfalzer; Alex Rigsby; Maddie Rooney; Haley Skarupa; Lee Stecklein	Canada; Meghan Agosta; Bailey Bram; Emily Clark; Mélodie Daoust; Ann-Renée Desbiens; Renata Fast; Laura Fortino; Haley Irwin; Brianne Jenner; Rebecca Johnston; Geneviève Lacasse; Brigette Lacquette; Jocelyne Larocque; Meaghan Mikkelson; Sarah Nurse; Marie-Philip Poulin; Lauriane Rougeau; Jillian Saulnier; Natalie Spooner; Laura Stacey; Shannon Szabados; Blayre Turnbull; Jenn Wakefield	Finland; Sanni Hakala; Jenni Hiirikoski; Venla Hovi; Mira Jalosuo; Michelle Karvinen; Rosa Lindstedt; Petra Nieminen; Tanja Niskanen; Emma Nuutinen; Isa Rahunen; Annina Rajahuhta; Meeri Räisänen; Noora Räty; Saila Saari; Ronja Savolainen; Eveliina Suonpää; Sara Säkkinen; Susanna Tapani; Noora Tulus; Minnamari Tuominen; Ella Viitasuo; Riikka Välilä; Linda Välimäki

== Men's tournament ==
The tournament featured 12 countries, eight qualifying through the IIHF World Ranking, 3 through subsequent qualifying tournaments, and the host South Korea men's national ice hockey team. The format were the same as 2010 and 2014; three groups of four competed in three games to determine seeding, each playing every other team in their group, followed by four rounds of elimination games. Each group winner received a bye into the second round, along with the highest ranked of the remaining teams. The remaining eight teams played an eliminating qualification game to advance to the quarter-final round. Each quarter-final winner advanced to the semi-finals with the winners playing for the gold medal and the losers playing for the bronze.

=== Qualification ===
Qualification was determined by the IIHF World Ranking following the 2015 Men's World Ice Hockey Championships. The top eight teams in the World Ranking received automatic berths into the Olympics, the host received an automatic berth, and the remaining teams competed to qualify for the remaining three spots. In April 2014 René Fasel indicated that the Koreans would need a ranking of 18th or better but in September of the same year the policy was apparently changed to guarantee the host a position.

=== NHL players ===
On 3 April 2017, the North American National Hockey League (NHL) announced that its players would not be made available for selection for the national teams in the 2018 Winter Olympics, marking the first time since 1998 that active NHL players would not be available for participating in the Olympic men's ice hockey tournament. While it was "open to hearing from any of the other parties who might have an interest in the issue", the NHL "confirmed that it [had] no interest or intention of engaging in any discussion that might make Olympic participation more attractive to the Clubs". The main disagreement between the NHL, IIHF, and IOC appears to have been over who would cover the cost of indemnifying the NHL players participating in the Games. Even though the IOC had paid to insure NHL players for the 2014 Olympics in Sochi, at a cost of $14 million, the commission was unwilling to do so for Pyeongchang, due to concerns that this would set a precedent and other professional sports bodies might expect similar treatment.

NHL Commissioner Gary Bettman explained that another factor in the decision was the IOC's refusal to allow the NHL to promote its players' involvement in the Olympics. He noted that the NHL does not directly profit from their presence in the Olympics and that the IOC's ambush marketing rules make it difficult for the league to capitalize on its players' participation, adding that "in fact, we kind of disappear for two weeks because historically the IOC hasn't even let us join in promoting our participation in the Olympics".

Following the decision to ban its players from selection for the national Olympic teams, the NHL secured the cooperation of the International Ice Hockey Federation and the IOC, who agreed to draw up a "blacklist" of players under NHL contract to help prevent national teams from nominating or accepting these players to their Olympic rosters. Consequently, the league did not schedule a break in its 2017–18 season to accommodate the Olympics. The league was required to accommodate an extended midseason break anyway because of its all-star game and league-wide bye week; to prevent players from defying the decision, the NHL scheduled the all-star game (which it traditionally does not contest in Olympic years) and league-wide bye in January.

The American Hockey League (AHL), a minor professional league that largely acts as a development league for the NHL, stated that it would allow its players to be loaned to national teams for the duration of the Olympics, although like the NHL, there would not be a break in the season for the Games. CBC Sports reported that AHL players under two-way contracts with NHL affiliates would still be prohibited from attending, but deputy commissioner Bill Daly initially denied the claim. Two weeks later, Daly reversed his position and confirmed that AHL players on two-way contracts would in fact be prohibited from the Olympics.

In July, American television company NBC Sports announced that it would not air any NHL games during the Winter Olympics on any of its national networks. However, in January they added three NHL noon games on NBC.

In contrast to the NHL, the vast majority of European leagues did include an Olympic break in their 2017–18 season: Russia-based KHL had a 33-day break; Sweden-based SHL took a 14-day break; Switzerland-based NL took 25 days; German-based DEL included a 26-day break; Czech Republic–based Extraliga took 18 days; and Slovakia-based Tipsport liga's break lasted for 14 days. Conversely, Finland-based SM-liiga did not accommodate a break, but allowed its top players to leave the clubs and participate in the Olympic Games.

== Women's tournament ==
The women's tournament ran from 10 to 22 February with eight nations competing. The format was the same as 2014. The top 4 seeded teams played in group A and the next four in group B. The top two seeds from group A received a bye from the quarterfinal round. The bottom two group A teams played the top two group B teams in the quarterfinal round. The winner of these two games played the top two group A teams in the semifinal round. The winners of the semifinal round played for the gold medal and the losers played for the bronze.

=== Qualification ===
Qualification was determined by the IIHF World Ranking following the 2016 IIHF Women's World Championship. The top five teams in the World Ranking received automatic berths into the Olympics. South Korea gained direct entry by being host and all other teams competed to qualify for the remaining two spots.

== Attendance ==
The 2018 Winter Olympic Ice hockey tournament saw a total of 223,892 spectators. The Men's tournament, specifically, had a total of 138,327 spectators across the 30 game event, and the Women's tournament had 85,565 spectators across the 22 game event. The tournaments were played in two locations, the Gangneung Hockey Centre, and the Kwandong Hockey Centre. The Gangneug Hockey Centre has a maximum capacity of 10,000 spectators. The Kwandong Hockey Centre has a maximum capacity of 6,000 spectators.

At the 2018 Pyeongchang Winter Olympics, ice hockey tournament, there was an average attendance of 4,610 spectators for the men's tournament, and 3,889 spectators for the women's tournament. The top four teams with the highest attendance for the men's tournament were, respectively, Korea, the Czech Republic, Slovakia, and the United States. For the women's tournament, the most attended games were, respectively, the United States, Korea, Finland, and Canada.

== Participating nations ==
A total of 496 athletes from 14 nations (including the IOC's designation of Olympic Athletes from Russia) were scheduled to participate (the numbers of athletes are shown in parentheses). The IOC initially admitted 13 men's or women's teams to compete. Later, North Korean athletes were rostered to participate in the women's tournament alongside South Korean athletes in a combined women's Korean team. Men's rosters can be made up of 25 players, while women's rosters can consist of up to 23. The Czech, German, Norwegian, Slovak, and Slovenian teams entered only the men's competition, while the Japanese team alone entered only the women's competition. All other teams played in both tournaments.

- Canada (48)
- Czech Republic (25)
- Finland (48)
- Germany (25)
- Japan (23)
- Korea (35)
- Norway (25)
- Olympic Athletes from Russia (48)
- Slovakia (25)
- Slovenia (25)
- South Korea (25)
- Sweden (48)
- Switzerland (48)
- United States (48)
